= Sailing at the 1900 Summer Olympics =

Sailing at the Games of the II Olympiad
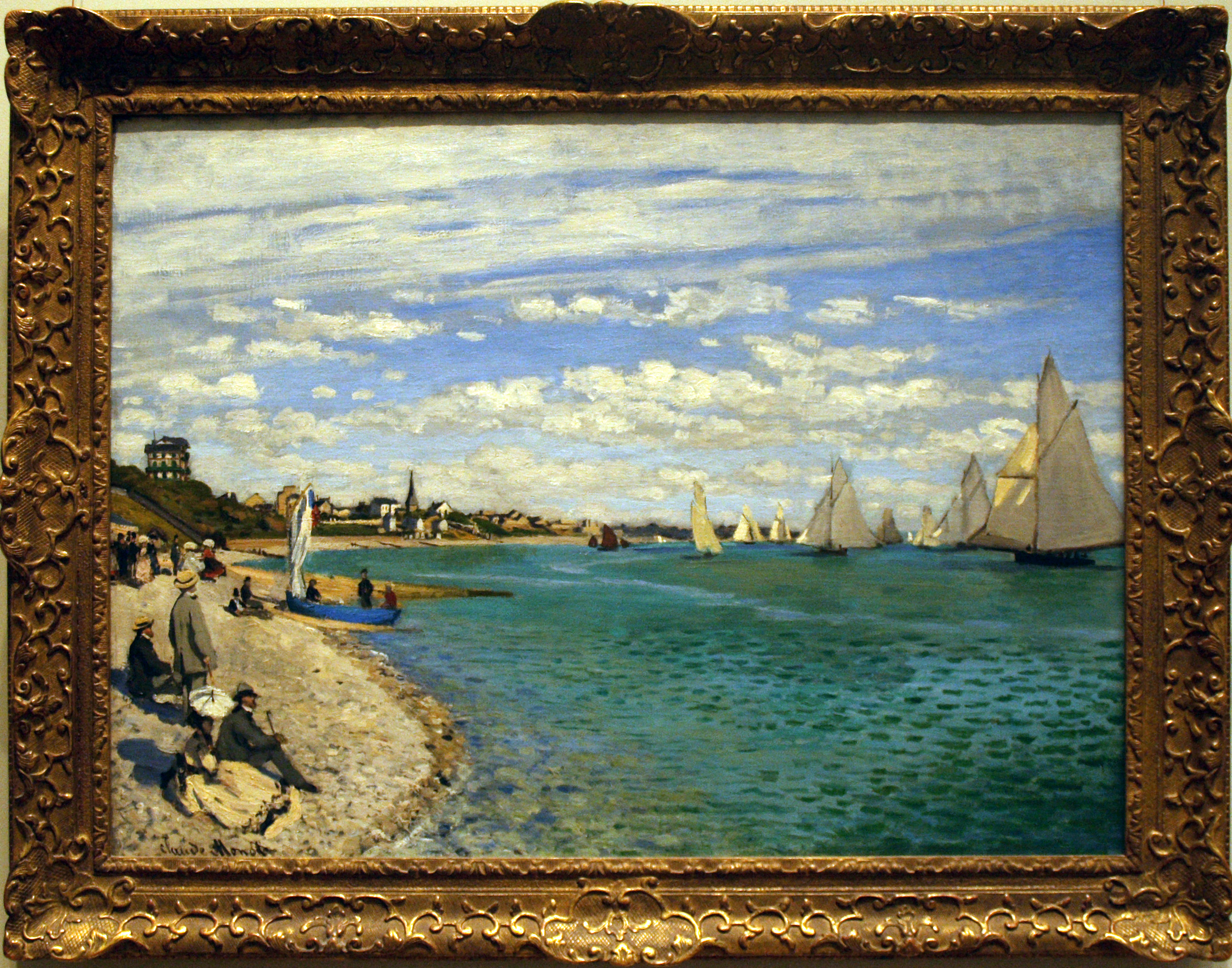
- An impression of yacht racing (1867) by Monet; North of Le Havre; Metropolitan Museum of Art
- Venues: Meulan; Le Havre
- Dates: 20 May 1900 – 27 May 1900 (Meulan); 1 August 1900 – 5 August 1900 (Le Havre)
- Competitors: about 150 (including 1 woman) from 6 nations
- Boats: 64

Sailing made its first appearance as an Olympic sport at the 1900 Summer Olympics after competitions were cancelled at the 1896 Olympics. With the exception of 1904, sailing was thereafter always a part of the Olympic program. The sailing program in 1900 consisted of a total of eight sailing classes. For six classes, the races were scheduled from 20 – 27 May at the river Seine around Meulan, and several series of three races were held for the largest classes from 1–5 August on the North Atlantic off the coast of Le Havre. Approximately 150 sailors in 64 boats (the numbers of boats and competitors are not reliable, as in the official report some figures of the World exhibition and the Olympic Games are mixed) from 6 nations competed, including 1 woman, Hélène de Pourtalès, who won a gold medal in the 1 to 2 ton.

== Venues ==
During the early years of the Olympic movement, there were no strict rules for the assignment of venues. For the Olympic sailing in 1900, the organizers decided to combine the Olympic sailing for the smaller yachts with the regattas of the Exposition Universelle on the river Seine near Meulan. For the larger yachts, an Olympic regatta was held at Le Havre.

=== Meulan ===
Cercle de la Voile de Paris Bassin Olympique de Meulan Les Mureaux
- Burgee of the Cercle de la Voile de Paris

General information
- Status: Completed
- Type: Club House
- Location: 30, quai Albert Glandaz, 78130 Les Mureaux, France
- Coordinates: 49°00′1″N 1°54′54″E
- Elevation: Sealevel
- Owner: Cercle de la Voile de Paris

During the Olympic regattas of the Exposition Universelle of 1900, there were more than 100 yachts racing from Paris, Rouen, Cannes, Nantes and Arcachon and yachts from England, Germany, the United States and Holland. The Bassin Olympique was the river Seine near the Cercle de la Voile de Paris that served as the Olympic harbor.

The race conditions at Meulan during the Olympic regatta were not ideal. A light breeze could hardly make the sailing interesting. Since the river Seine mainly runs from east to west, the light north-easterly breeze was partly blocked by buildings or trees on the river bank, thus heavily influencing the regatta.

=== Le Havre ===
During the second part of the Olympic regatta, the Atlantic Ocean was used for the races of the 10 – 20 ton and the 20^{+} ton yachts. The conditions during the regatta were so good that the 10 – 20 Ton class was able to sail the complete 22 nautical mile triangular course. The premises of the Société des Régates du Havre were used as Olympic harbor.

La Société des Régates du Havre Le Havre

General information
- Status: Destroyed
- Type: Club House
- Location: France
- Coordinates: 49°29′30″N 0°5′45″E
- Elevation: Sealevel
- Owner: La Société des Régates du Havre

=== Course areas ===
Since there were two venues, there were two course areas. One was on the river Seine near Meulan. Here, the organization could set courses of 8, 15 and 19 kilometres (4.3, 8.1 and 10.3 nmi). The other course area was on the North Atlantic off the coats of Le Havre. Here, courses could be set up to 40 nautical miles (74 km).

1900 Olympic Course Areas

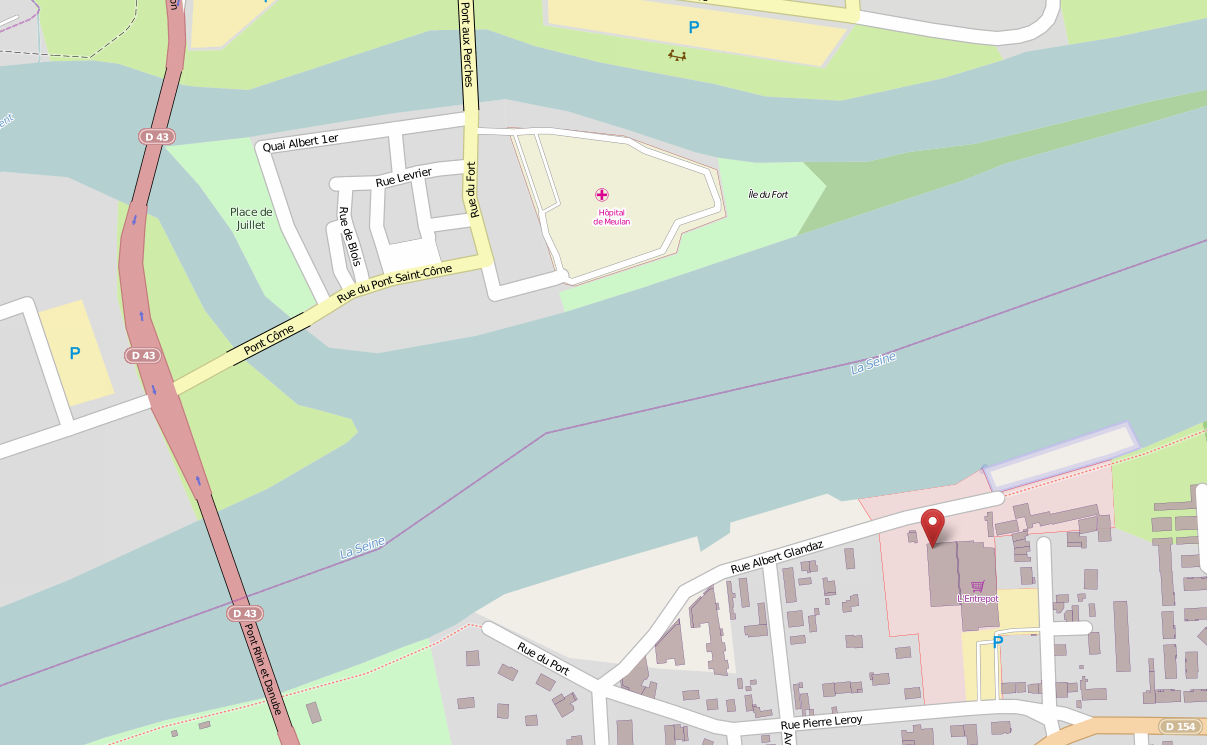
Course area Meulan

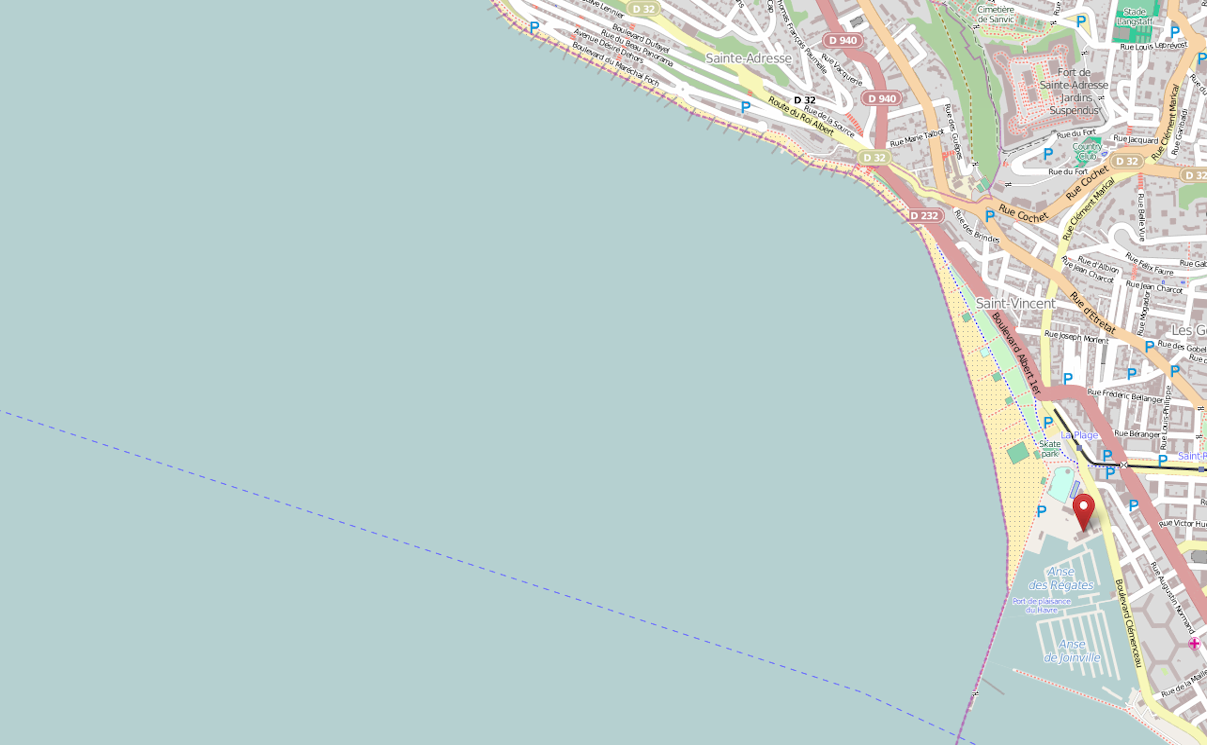
Course area Le Havre

== Participating nations ==
6 nations sent sailors. Several teams had crews from multiple countries, and in one case, they won a gold medal. This team of the United Kingdom and France, is attributed as a mixed team.

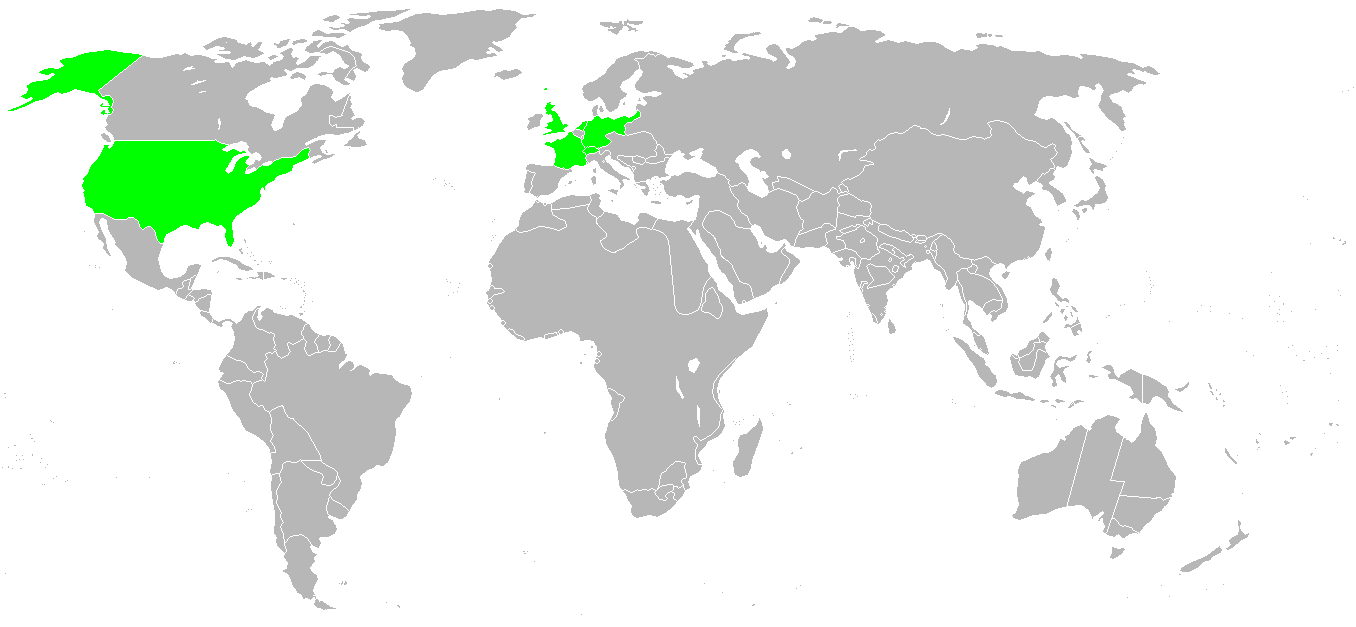
Map of Participating Sailing Countries at the 1900 Summer Olympics ● Green = Participating for the first time

- France (76)
- Germany (4)
- Great Britain (73)
- Netherlands (3)
- Switzerland (3)
- United States (3)
- Mixed team

== Classes (equipment) ==
Sailing during the turn of the century was not as well defined as it became later during the 20th century. Racing rules were mostly defined by local yacht clubs, or in some cases, by a National Yachting Federation. Also, boats were not standardized to what are now called One Design or One Builder classes. Therefore, many handicap systems or systems that put yachts into different categories were used. In 1892, Auguste Godinet developed a formula that placed different boats in different Ton categories. This rule was adopted by the Union des yachts français, and later by several other National Yachting Federations, such as the Société Nautique de Genève. For the sailing at the 1900 Olympics, this rule was chosen to determine the tonnage of a yacht.

For the smallest class, 0 – ½ Ton, among others, Larks were used. These Larks, copies of the Davis Lark and of the Sorceress designed by Linton Hope, became famous One Designs in France (Monotype de Chatou at the beginning of the 20th century.

The Olympics were open for the following classes:

Class	Type	Venue	Event	Sailors	First OG	Olympics so far
Open Class	Undefined	Meulan		Unknown	1900	1
0 – ½ Ton	Undefined	Meulan		Unknown	1900	1
0 – ½ Ton	Undefined	Meulan		Unknown	1900	2
½ – 1 Ton	Undefined	Meulan		Unknown	1900	1
½ – 1 Ton	Undefined	Meulan		Unknown	1900	2
1 – 2 Ton	Undefined	Meulan		Unknown	1900	1
1 – 2 Ton	Undefined	Meulan		Unknown	1900	2
2 – 3 Ton	Undefined	Meulan		Unknown	1900	1
2 – 3 Ton	Undefined	Meulan		Unknown	1900	2
3 – 10 Ton	Undefined	Meulan		Unknown	1900	1
3 – 10 Ton	Undefined	Meulan		Unknown	1900	2
10 – 20 Ton	Undefined	Le Havre		Unknown	1900	1
20^{+} Ton	Undefined	Le Havre		Unknown	1900	1
Legend: = Mixed gender event
Inshore classes (Meulan) Lark; 0 – 0.5 Ton Sidi-Fekkar; 0.5 - 1 Ton Lerina; 1 – 2 Ton Phoebus; 2 – 3 Ton Turquoise; 3 – 10 Ton Offshore classes (Le Havre) Laurea; 10 – 20 Ton Colombine; 20+ Ton

== Race schedule ==
●	Meulan competition	●	Le Havre competition

1900	May								August					
1900	20 Sun	21 Mon	22 Tue	23 Wed	24 Thu	25 Fri	26 Sat	27 Thu	1 Fri	2 Sat	3 Sun	4 Mon	5 Tue	6 Wed
Sailing	1		1 1 1		1 1 1	1 1 1 1		No wind	1	1			1	1
Total gold medals	1		3		3	4				1				1

== Medal summary ==
The results of the individual races are known; however, in the past there has not been consensus on which races were considered "Olympic" and thus who the Olympic medalists were. The Official Report, International Olympic Committee (IOC), International Sailing Federation (ISAF) and Sports Reference present different medalists. The IOC has never decided which events were "Olympic" and which were not. Occasionally, sources differ on the nationality of competitors (such as H. MacHenry, alternately listed as French or American). For example, the medalists in the 3 – 10 Ton races are shown in the various sources as:

Report	Race	Gold	Silver	Bronze
Official Report	Race 1	Henri Gilardoni (FRA)	Henri Smulders (NED)	Maurice Gufflet (FRA)
Official Report	Race 2	Howard Taylor (GBR)	Maurice Gufflet (FRA)	H. MacHenry (FRA)
IOC and ISAF	Race 2	Howard Taylor (GBR)	Maurice Gufflet (FRA)	H. MacHenry (FRA)
Sports Reference	Race 1	Henri Gilardoni (FRA)	Henri Smulders (NED)	Maurice Gufflet (FRA)
Sports Reference	Race 2	Howard Taylor (GBR)	Maurice Gufflet (FRA)	H. MacHenry (USA)

In all classes at Meulan except the Open class, there were two distinct "finals." Boats were assigned time handicaps according to their weight within each class and prizes were handed out to the winners of each race. The IOC initially recognized the winner of the first race in each class as Olympic champion except in the case of the 10 – 20 ton class, which was decided on aggregate time over three races. However, currently the participants of both first and second races in three classes (0 – 0.5t, 1 – 2t and 2 – 3t) are present in the IOC database as medalists. That is, the second race in each of these three classes is recognized by the IOC and for each of these events two gold, two silver, and two bronze medals were retrospectively awarded by the IOC. In the 3 – 10 Ton race, however, only the second race winners are listed with Olympic medals.

The data below notes all races and medalists of the regattas of the Games of the second Olympiad, as well as of the Exposition Universelle and counts all winners as medalists, because the IOC website currently affirms a total of 95 medal events in the Games.

Event	Gold	Silver	Bronze
Open class	Great Britain; Lorne Currie; John Gretton; Linton Hope; Algernon Maudslay	Germany; Paul Wiesner; Georg Naue; Heinrich Peters; Ottokar Weise	France; Émile Michelet
0 to .5 ton Race 1 (Note: Two races in this class are recognized by the IOC. Thus, for this event, two gold, two silver, and two bronze medals were retrospectively awarded.)	France; Pierre Gervais	France; François Texier; Auguste Texier; Jean-Baptiste Charcot; Robert Linzeler	France; Henri Monnot; Léon Tellier; Gaston Cailleux
0 to .5 ton Race 2	France; Émile Sacré	France; François Texier; Auguste Texier; Jean-Baptiste Charcot; Robert Linzeler	France; Pierre Gervais
.5 to 1 ton Race 1	Great Britain; Lorne Currie; John Gretton; Linton Hope; Algernon Maudslay	France; Jules Valton; Félix Marcotte; William Martin; Jacques Baudrier; Jean Le Bret	France; Émile Michelet; Marcel Meran
.5 to 1 ton Race 2	France; Louis Auguste-Dormeuil	France; Émile Michelet; Marcel Meran	France; Jules Valton; Félix Marcotte; William Martin; Jacques Baudrier; Jean Le Bret
1 to 2 ton Race 1	Switzerland; Hermann de Pourtalès; Hélène de Pourtalès; Bernard de Pourtalès	France; François Vilamitjana; Auguste Albert; Albert Duval; Charles Hugo	France; Jacques Baudrier; Lucien Baudrier; Dubosq; Édouard Mantois
1 to 2 ton Race 2	Germany; Paul Wiesner; Georg Naue; Heinrich Peters; Ottokar Weise	Switzerland; Hermann de Pourtalès; Hélène de Pourtalès; Bernard de Pourtalès	France; François Vilamitjana; Auguste Albert; Albert Duval; Charles Hugo
2 to 3 ton Race 1	France; William Exshaw (GBR); Frédéric Blanchy (FRA); Jacques Le Lavasseur (FRA)	France; Léon Susse; Jacques Doucet; Auguste Godinet; Henri Mialaret	France; Ferdinand Schlatter; Gilbert de Cotignon; Émile Jean-Fontaine
2 to 3 ton Race 2	France; William Exshaw (GBR); Frédéric Blanchy (FRA); Jacques Le Lavasseur (FRA)	France; Léon Susse; Jacques Doucet; Auguste Godinet; Henri Mialaret	France; Auguste Donny
3 to 10 ton Race 1	France; Henri Gilardoni	Netherlands; Henri Smulders; Chris Hooijkaas; Arie van der Velden	France; Maurice Gufflet; A. Dubois; J. Dubois; Robert Gufflet; Charles Guiraist
3 to 10 ton Race 2	Great Britain; Howard Taylor; Edward Hore; Harry Jefferson	France; Maurice Gufflet; A. Dubois; J. Dubois; Robert Gufflet; Charles Guiraist	United States; H. MacHenry (USA) (Note: John Howard Taylor (GBR) is sometimes mentioned as a crewman, but is only known to have designed boat Frimousse, not sailed it.)
10 to 20 ton	France; Émile Billard; Paul Perquer	France; Jean, duc Decazes	Great Britain; Edward Hore
20+ ton	Great Britain; Cecil Quentin	Great Britain; Selwin Calverley	United States; Harry Van Bergen

== Medal table ==
All races are now considered official Olympic events, as the IOC website affirms 95 total medal events.

Rank	Nation	Gold	Silver	Bronze	Total
1	France	7	9	10	26
2	Great Britain	4	1	1	6
3	Germany	1	1	0	2
3	Switzerland	1	1	0	2
5	Netherlands	0	1	0	1
6	United States	0	0	2	2
Totals (6 entries)		13	13	13	39

== Notes ==
There was some discussion about the validity of the Olympic status of Sailing at the 1900 Summer Olympics. Ian Buchanan, first president of the International Society of Olympic Historians, stated, "Given the possible awarding of cash prizes, the "Olympic status" of this sport in 1900 must be in question. It is not exactly certain if the prizes were cash or "objets d’art" of the values listed, thus, for now, I have retained yachting as an Olympic sport in 1900."

== Other information ==
During the sailing regattas at the 1900 Summer Olympics among others the following persons were competing (or owning yachts) in the various classes:

- Celebrities
  - France, Édouard Alphonse James de Rothschild
  - Switzerland, Hermann de Pourtalès
- First female Olympic gold medalist:
  - Switzerland, Hélène de Pourtalès
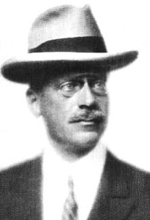
Édouard Alphonse James de Rothschild
