= Sailing at the 1900 Summer Olympics – Open class =

Open class Sailing at the Games of the II Olympiad
- Open Class
- Venue: Meulan
- Date: First race: 20 May 1900
- Competitors: about 78 from 6 nations
- Teams: about 47

Medalists
1st place, gold medalist(s)		Lorne Currie, John H. Gretton, Linton Hope, Algernon Maudslay	Great Britain
2nd place, silver medalist(s)		Paul Wiesner, Georg Naue, Heinrich Peters, Ottokar Weise	Germany
3rd place, bronze medalist(s)		Émile Michelet	France

The Open class was a sailing event on the Sailing at the 1900 Summer Olympics program in Meulan. All boats intended to compete in other races of the Meulan program were supposed to compete in the Concours d'Honneur (Open class). It was held on 20 May 1900. About seventy–eight sailors, on about forty–seven boats, from six nations competing. The latest finishing time was at 19:00 hours. Only seven boats made it to the finish in time.

== Race schedule ==
●	Meulan competition	●	Le Havre competition

1900	May								August					
1900	20 Sun	21 Mon	22 Tue	23 Wed	24 Thu	25 Fri	26 Sat	27 Thu	1 Fri	2 Sat	3 Sun	4 Mon	5 Tue	6 Wed
Open class	●													
Total gold medals	1													

== Course area and course configuration ==
For the Open class the Meulan course area was used.

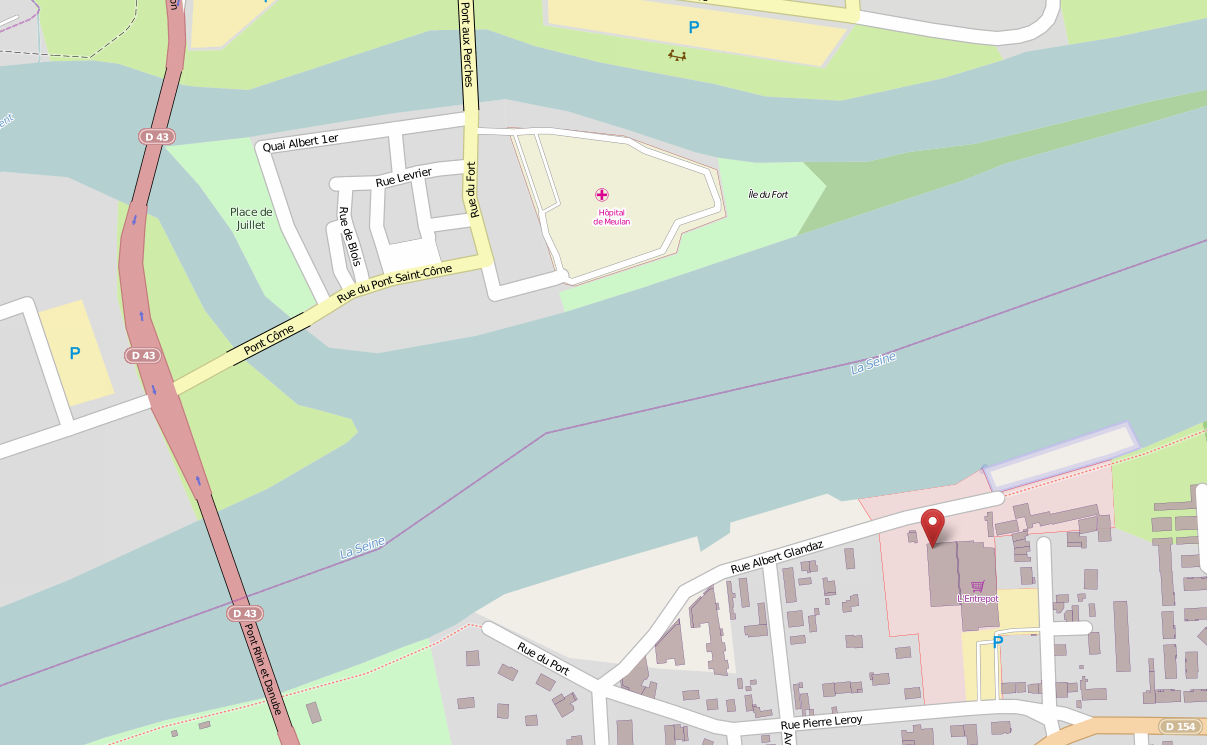
Course area Meulan

== Weather conditions ==
The race was troublesome due to an almost complete absence of any wind and the existing wind was perpendicular to the course (river Seine) and blocked or diverted by trees and buildings.

== Final results ==
Rank	Country	Helmsman	Crew	Boat	Medalrace	
Rank	Country	Helmsman	Crew	Boat	Pos.	Pts.
1st place, gold medalist(s)	Great Britain	Lorne Currie	John H. Gretton; Linton Hope; Algernon Maudslay	Scotia; 1.0 Ton	1	5:56:17
2nd place, silver medalist(s)	Germany	Paul Wiesner	Georg Naue; Heinrich Peters; Ottokar Weise	Aschenbrödel; 1.041 Ton	2	5:58:17
3rd place, bronze medalist(s)	France	Émile Michelet	Unknown; Unknown;	Turquoise; 10.0 Ton	3	6:12:12
4	France	Émile Sacré	Unknown; Unknown;	Fantlet; 0.5 Ton	4	7:11:8
5	France	Jean d'Estournelles de Constant	Unknown; Unknown;	Pierre et Jean; 1.0 Ton	5	Unknown
	France	François Texier	Auguste Texier; Texier	Mamie; 1.0 Ton	DSQ (42)	NA
	France	Louis Auguste-Dormeuil	Unknown; Unknown;	Carabinier; 1.0 Ton	DSQ (41)	NA
	France	Lecointre	Unknown; Unknown;	Alcyon	DNF (40)	NA
	France	Eugène Laverne	Henri Laverne; Unknown;	Amulet	DNF (39)	NA
	France	Phocion Rossollin	Unknown; Unknown;	Ariette	DNF (38)	NA
	France	Pierre Gervais	Unknown; Unknown;	Baby	DNF (37)	NA
	France	Albert Glandaz	Unknown; Unknown;	Colette	DNF (36)	NA
	France	Jean De Chabanne La Palice	Unknown; Unknown;	Crabe I	DNF (35)	NA
	France	Jacques Baudrier	Jean Le Bret; Félix Marcotte; William Martin; Jules Valton	Crabe II	DNF (34)	NA
	France	Jean Le Bret	Unknown; Unknown;	Crocodile	DNF (33)	NA
	France	Unknown;	Unknown; Unknown;	Demi Mondaine	DNF (32)	NA
	France	Unknown;	Unknown; Unknown;	Ducky	DNF (31)	NA
	France	Unknown;	Unknown; Unknown;	Favorite	DNF (30)	NA
	France	Unknown;	Unknown; Unknown;	Fémur	DNF (29)	NA
	France	Unknown;	Unknown; Unknown;	Freia	DNF (28)	NA
	France	Unknown;	Unknown; Unknown;	Galopin	DNF (27)	NA
	France	Unknown;	Unknown; Unknown;	Gitane	DNF (26)	NA
	France	Unknown;	Unknown; Unknown;	Gwendoline	DNF (25)	NA
	France	Unknown;	Unknown; Unknown;	Gyp	DNF (24)	NA
	France	Unknown;	Unknown; Unknown;	Hébé	DNF (23)	NA
	France	Unknown;	Unknown; Unknown;	Jeannette	DNF (22)	NA
	France	Unknown;	Unknown; Unknown;	Marsouin	DNF (21)	NA
	France	Unknown;	Unknown; Unknown;	Marthe	DNF (20)	NA
	France	Unknown;	Unknown; Unknown;	Mascaret	DNF (19)	NA
	France	Unknown;	Unknown; Unknown;	Mignon	DNF (18)	NA
	France	Unknown;	Unknown; Unknown;	Quand-Même	DNF	NA
	France	Unknown;	Unknown; Unknown;	Sarcelle	DNF (16)	NA
	France	Unknown;	Unknown; Unknown;	Scamasaxe	DNF (15)	NA
	France	Unknown;	Unknown; Unknown;	Sidi-Fekkar	DNF (14)	NA
	France	Unknown;	Unknown; Unknown;	Souriceau	DNF (13)	NA
	France	Unknown;	Unknown; Unknown;	Suzon IV	DNF (12)	NA
	France	Unknown;	Unknown; Unknown;	Tornade	DNF (11)	NA
	France	Unknown;	Unknown; Unknown;	C.V.A.	DNF (10)	NA
	France	Unknown;	Unknown; Unknown;	Nina Claire	DNF (9)	NA
	France	Unknown;	Unknown; Unknown;	Pirouette	DNF (8)	NA
	France	Unknown;	Unknown; Unknown;	Plume-patte	DNF (7)	NA
	France	Unknown;	Unknown; Unknown;	Singy	DNF (6)	NA
	France	Roosevelt	Unknown; Unknown;	Verveine	DNF (5)	NA
	Netherlands	Unknown;	Unknown; Unknown;	Mascotte	DNF (4)	NA
	Switzerland	Count Hermann de Pourtalès	Countess Hélène de Pourtalès; Count Bernard de Pourtalès	Lérina	DNF (3)	NA
	United States	H. MacHenry	Unknown; Unknown;	Frimousse & Singy	DNF (2)	NA
	Mixed team	William Exshaw (GBR)	Frédéric Blanchy (FRA); Jacques Le Lavasseur (FRA)	Ollé	DNF (1)	NA

Legend: DNF – Did not finish; DSQ – Disqualified;
Gender: – male; – female;

== Notes ==
Two competitors, “Mamie” and “Carabinier”, were disqualified for using “other means of propulsion than the sail.” This made them the first sailors ever to be disqualified in an Olympic regatta.

== Other information ==
Yachting World states the races were open to yachts up to 30 tons; however, no 30 ton boats were entered.
