= Sailing at the 1900 Summer Olympics – .5 to 1 ton =

0.5 to 1 Ton Sailing at the Games of the II Olympiad
- 0.5 - 1 Ton Class
- Venue: Meulan
- Date: First race: August 24, 1900; Second race: August 25, 1900
- Competitors: 35 (documented) from 3 nations
- Teams: 20

Medalists
1st place, gold medalist(s)		Lorne Currie, Algernon Maudslay, John Gretton, Linton Hope	Great Britain
1st place, gold medalist(s)		Louis Auguste-Dormeuil	France
2nd place, silver medalist(s)		Jules Valton, Jacques Baudrier, Jean Le Bret, Félix Marcotte, William Martin	France
2nd place, silver medalist(s)		Émile Michelet, Marcel Meran	France
3rd place, bronze medalist(s)		Émile Michelet, Marcel Meran	France
3rd place, bronze medalist(s)		Jules Valton, Jacques Baudrier, Jean Le Bret, Félix Marcotte, William Martin	France

The 0.5 to 1 ton was a sailing event on the Sailing at the 1900 Summer Olympics program in Meulan. Twenty boats started during the two races in the 0.5 to 1 ton. thirty–five competitors from three countries are documented. The races were held on 24 and 25 May 1900 on the river Seine.

== Race schedule ==
●	Meulan competition	●	Le Havre competition

1900	May								August					
1900	20 Sun	21 Mon	22 Tue	23 Wed	24 Thu	25 Fri	26 Sat	27 Thu	1 Fri	2 Sat	3 Sun	4 Mon	5 Tue	6 Wed
0.5 to 1 ton					●	●								
Total gold medals					1	1								

== Course area and course configuration ==
For the 0.5 to 1 ton the 15 kilometres (8.1 nmi) course in the Meulan course area was used.

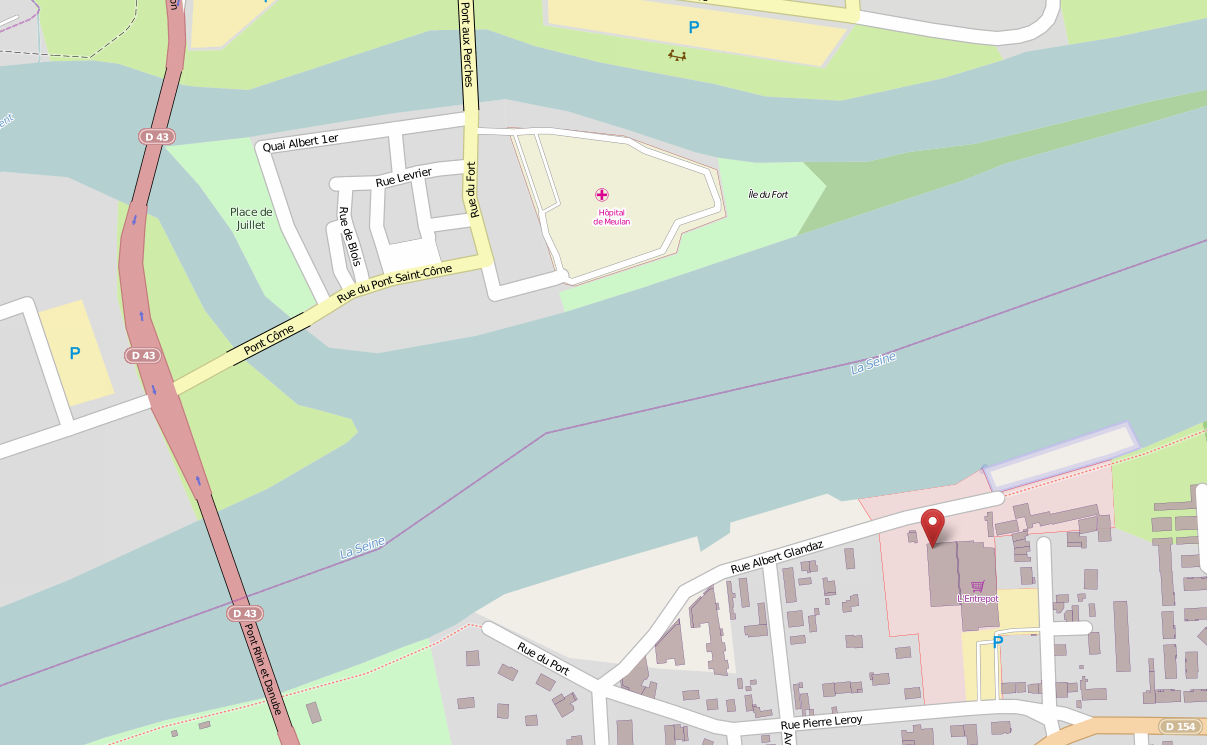
Course area Meulan

== Weather conditions ==
The race was troublesome due to an almost complete absence of any wind and the existing wind was perpendicular to the course (river Seine) and blocked or diverted by trees and buildings.

== Final results ==
Two separate races were sailed. No combined results were made.

=== Race of 24 May 1900 ===
Rank	Country	Helmsman	Crew	Boat	Medalrace	
Rank	Country	Helmsman	Crew	Boat	Pos.	Pts.
1st place, gold medalist(s)	Great Britain	Lorne Currie	Algernon Maudslay; John Gretton; Linton Hope	Scotia	1	03:29:45
2nd place, silver medalist(s)	France	Jules Valton	Jacques Baudrier; Jean Le Bret; Félix Marcotte; William Martin	Crabe II	2	03:39:23
3rd place, bronze medalist(s)	France	Émile Michelet	Marcel Meran	Scamasaxe	3	03:42:40
4	France	Jean De Chabanne La Palice	Unknown	Crabe I	4	03:47:11
5	France	Jean d'Estournelles de Constant	Unknown	Pierre et Jean	5	03:52:44
6	France	L. Legru	Unknown	Suzon IV	6	03:53:50
7	France	Louis Auguste-Dormeuil	Unknown	Pettit-Poucet	7	03:56:55
8	France	François Texier	Auguste Texier	C.V.A.	8	04:00:32
9	France	Marc Jousset	Unknown	Dick	9	04:03:00
10	France	Letot	Dupland	Galopin	10	04:03:58
11	France	Phocion Rossollin	Unknown	Ariette	11	04:04:21
12	France	Owner: Jean Le Bret	Unknown	Crocodile	12	04:06:40
13	France	Albert Glandaz	Unknown	Colette	13	04:08:00
14	France	Henri Gauthier	Unknown	Cinara	14	04:10:00
15	France	Paul Couture	Unknown	Tornade	15	04:19:52
	France	Eugène Laverne	Georges Pottier; Faustin Jouët-Pastré; Paul de Boulogne	Sidi-Fekkar	DSQ	
	Germany	Paul Wiesner	Arthur Bloomfeld; Georg Naue; Heinrich Peters	Aschenbrödel	DSQ	
	France	Édouard Mézan de Malartic	Unknown	Jeannette	DNS	
	France	G. Pigeard	Unknown	Demi-Mondaine	DNS	
	France	Roosevelt	Unknown	Verveine	DNS	

Legend: DNS – Did not start; DSQ – Disqualified;
Gender: – male; – female;

=== Race of 25 May 1900 ===
Rank	Country	Helmsman	Crew	Boat	Medalrace	
Rank	Country	Helmsman	Crew	Boat	Pos.	Pts.
1st place, gold medalist(s)	France	Louis Auguste-Dormeuil	Unknown	Pettit-Poucet	1	03:27:07
2nd place, silver medalist(s)	France	Émile Michelet	Marcel Meran	Scamasaxe	2	03:30:31
3rd place, bronze medalist(s)	France	Jules Valton	Jacques Baudrier; Jean Le Bret; Félix Marcotte; William Martin	Crabe II	3	03:41:24
4	Great Britain	Lorne Currie	Algernon Maudslay; John Gretton; Linton Hope	Scotia	4	03:45:46
5	France	Jean De Chabanne La Palice	Unknown	Crabe I	5	03:50:45
6	France	L. Legru	Unknown	Suzon IV	6	03:59:27
7	France	Letot	Dupland	Galopin	7	04:05:40
8	France	Phocion Rossollin	Unknown	Ariette	8	04:08:10
9	France	François Texier	Auguste Texier	C.V.A.	9	04:30:08
10	France	G. Pigeard	Unknown	Demi-Mondaine	10	04:30:08
	France	Owner: Jean Le Bret	Unknown	Crocodile	DNF	
	France	Jean d'Estournelles de Constant	Unknown	Pierre et Jean	DNF	
	France	Albert Glandaz	Unknown	Colette	DNF	
	France	Eugène Laverne	Georges Pottier; Faustin Jouët-Pastré; Paul de Boulogne	Sidi-Fekkar	DNF	
	France	Édouard Mézan de Malartic	Unknown	Jeannette	DNF	
	France	Roosevelt	Unknown	Verveine	DNF	
	France	Paul Couture	Unknown	Tornade	DNS	
	France	Henri Gauthier	Unknown	Cinara	DNS	
	France	Marc Jousset	Unknown	Dick	DNS	

Legend: DNF – Did not finish; DNS – Did not start;
Gender: – male; – female;

== Notes ==
Jean d'Estournelles de Constant one of the participants in this class was also the chef de bureau à la Direction des beaux-arts as well as secrétaire des courses du Cercle de la voile of the event. He also wrote the section on the Olympic sailing of 1900 in the official report.

== Other information ==
Initially only the race on 24 May 1900 was part of the Olympic program. However the race on the 25 May 1900, initially part of the Exposition Universelle program, was afterwards awarded with an Olympic status.
