= Georges Pottier =

French sailor

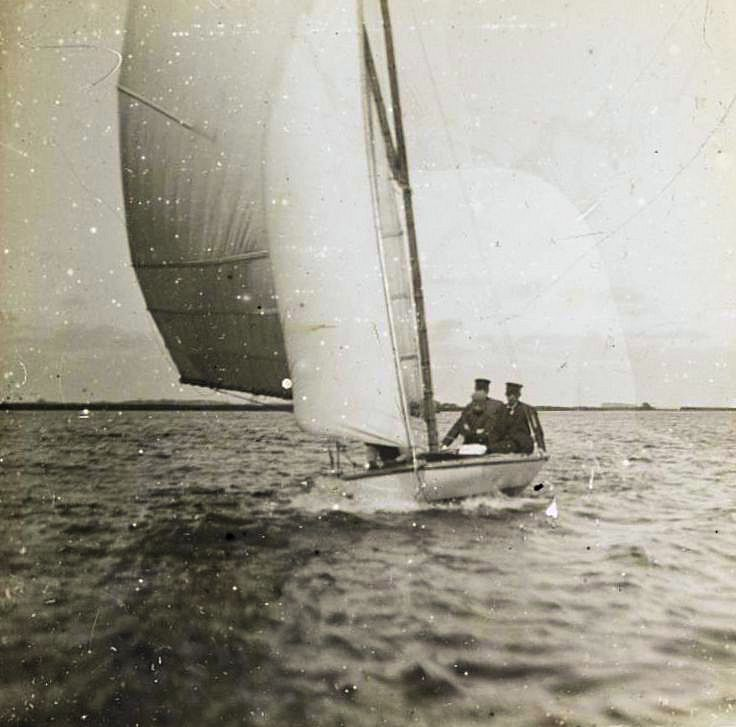
- The yacht Sidi-Fekkar that was crewed by Georges Pottier during the 1900 Olympics

Personal information
- Nationality: French
- Born: 29 January 1867
- Died: 18 July 1931 (aged 64)

Sport

Sailing career
- Class(es): 0.5 to 1 ton Open class

Georges Pottier (29 January 1867 – 18 July 1931) was a French sailor who competed in the 1900 Summer Olympics in Meulan, France. Pottier as crew was disqualified in first race of the 0.5 to 1 ton and did not finish in the second race. He did this with the boat Sidi-Fekkar.
