= Édouard Mézan de Malartic =

French sailor

Personal information
- Full name: Éloi Léon Eugène Joseph Auguste Mézan de Malartic
- Born: 7 August 1870 Saint-Gaudens, Second French Empire
- Died: 16 November 1936 (aged 66) Paris, France

Sport

Sailing career
- Class(es): 0.5 to 1 ton Open class
- Club: CVP

Éloi Léon Eugène Joseph Auguste "Édouard" Mézan de Malartic (7 August 1870 – 16 November 1936) was a French sailor who represented his country at the 1900 Summer Olympics in Meulan, France. As a helmsman on the boat Jeannette, de Malartic did not start in the first race of the 0.5 to 1 ton and did not finish in the second race.
