= G. Pigeard =

French sailor

Personal information
- Nationality: French

Sport

Sailing career
- Class(es): 0.5 to 1 ton Open class
- Club: CVP

G. Pigeard was a French artist and sailor who competed in the 1900 Summer Olympics in Meulan, France. G. Pigeard as helmsman did not finish in the Mixed Open, and finished 11th in the Mixed 0.5 to 1 Ton, sailing the boat Demi-Mondaine.

He is mentioned in a memoir by the painter Charles Picart Le Doux. After World War I, on a sentimental walk through Montmartre in Paris, Picart Le Doux writes,

I searched in vain for traces of the studio that the painter-navigator Pigeard had built with demolition materials...along Avenue Junot. It was with Pigeard that I made my debut as an "amateur yachtman," in Le Havre, on his monotype. I even made imaginary journeys in his little Chinese room, after smoking a few pipes of opium.
