= Paul Couture (sailor) =

French sailor

Personal information
- Nationality: French

Sport

Sailing career
- Class(es): 0.5 to 1 ton Open class

Paul Couture (French pronunciation: [pɔl kutyʁ]) was a French sailor who represented his country at the 1900 Summer Olympics in Meulan, France. Couture, as helmsman, took the 15th place in the first race of the 0.5 to 1 ton and did not start in the second race. He did this with the boat Tornade.
