= Dupland =

French sailor

Personal information
- Nationality: French

Sport

Sailing career
- Class(es): 0.5 to 1 ton Open class

Dupland was a French sailor who represented his country at the 1900 Summer Olympics in Meulan, France. Dupland as crew, took the 10th place in first race of the 0.5 to 1 ton and finished 7th in the second race. He did this with the boat Galopin.
