= Henri Gauthier (sailor) =

French sailor

Personal information
- Nationality: French

Sport

Sailing career
- Class: 0.5 to 1 ton
- Club: Yacht-Club de France

Henri Gauthier (fl. 1900) was a French sailor who represented his country at the 1900 Summer Olympics in Meulan, France. Henri took the 14th place in the first race of the 0.5 to 1 ton, as helmsman. He did this with the boat Cinara. He did not finish in the second race.
