= Paul de Boulogne =

French sailor

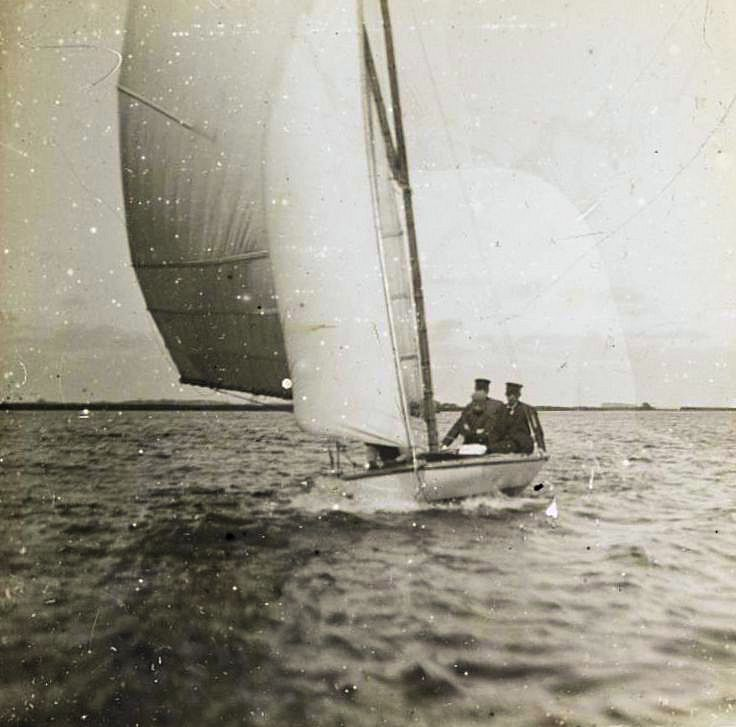
- The yacht Sidi-Fekkar that was crewed by Paul de Boulogne during the 1900 Olympics

Personal information
- Nationality: French
- Born: 26 June 1863
- Died: 6 November 1937 (aged 74)

Sport

Sailing career
- Class(es): 0.5 to 1 ton Open class

Paul de Boulogne (26 June 1863 – 6 November 1937) was a French sailor who represented his country at the 1900 Summer Olympics in Meulan, France. Pierre de Boulogne and crew, were disqualified in the first race of the 0.5 to 1 ton and did not finish in the second race. He did this with the boat Sidi-Fekkar.
