= Faustin Jouët-Pastré =

French sailor

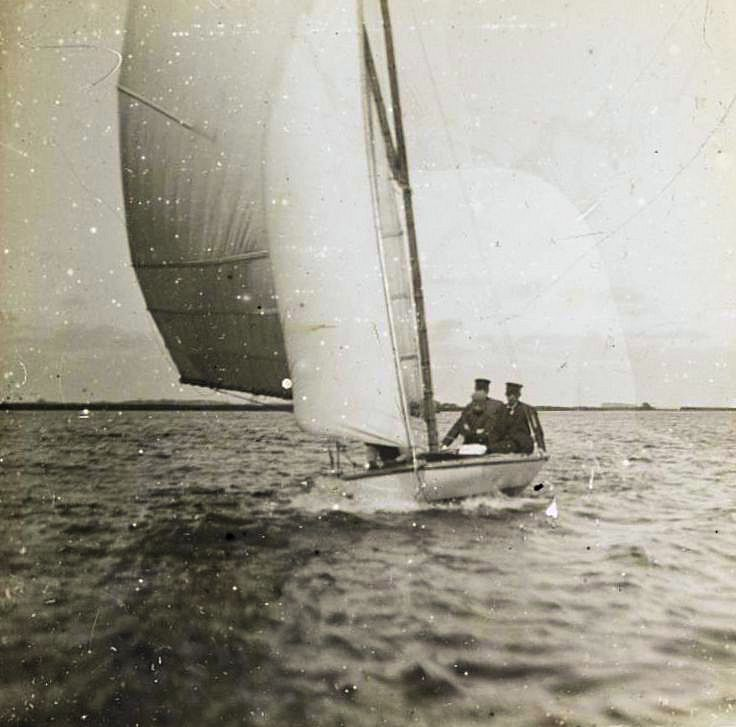
- The yacht Sidi-Fekkar that was crewed by Faustin Jouët-Pastré during the 1900 Olympics

Personal information
- Nationality: French
- Born: 24 October 1866
- Died: 26 March 1948 (aged 81)

Sport

Sailing career
- Class(es): 0.5 to 1 ton Open class

Faustin Jouët-Pastré (24 October 1866 – 26 March 1948) was a French sailor who represented his country at the 1900 Summer Olympics in Meulan, France. Jouët-Pastré as crew, was disqualified in first race of the 0.5 to 1 ton and did not finish in the second race. He did this with the boat Sidi-Fekkar.
