= Albert Glandaz =

French sailor

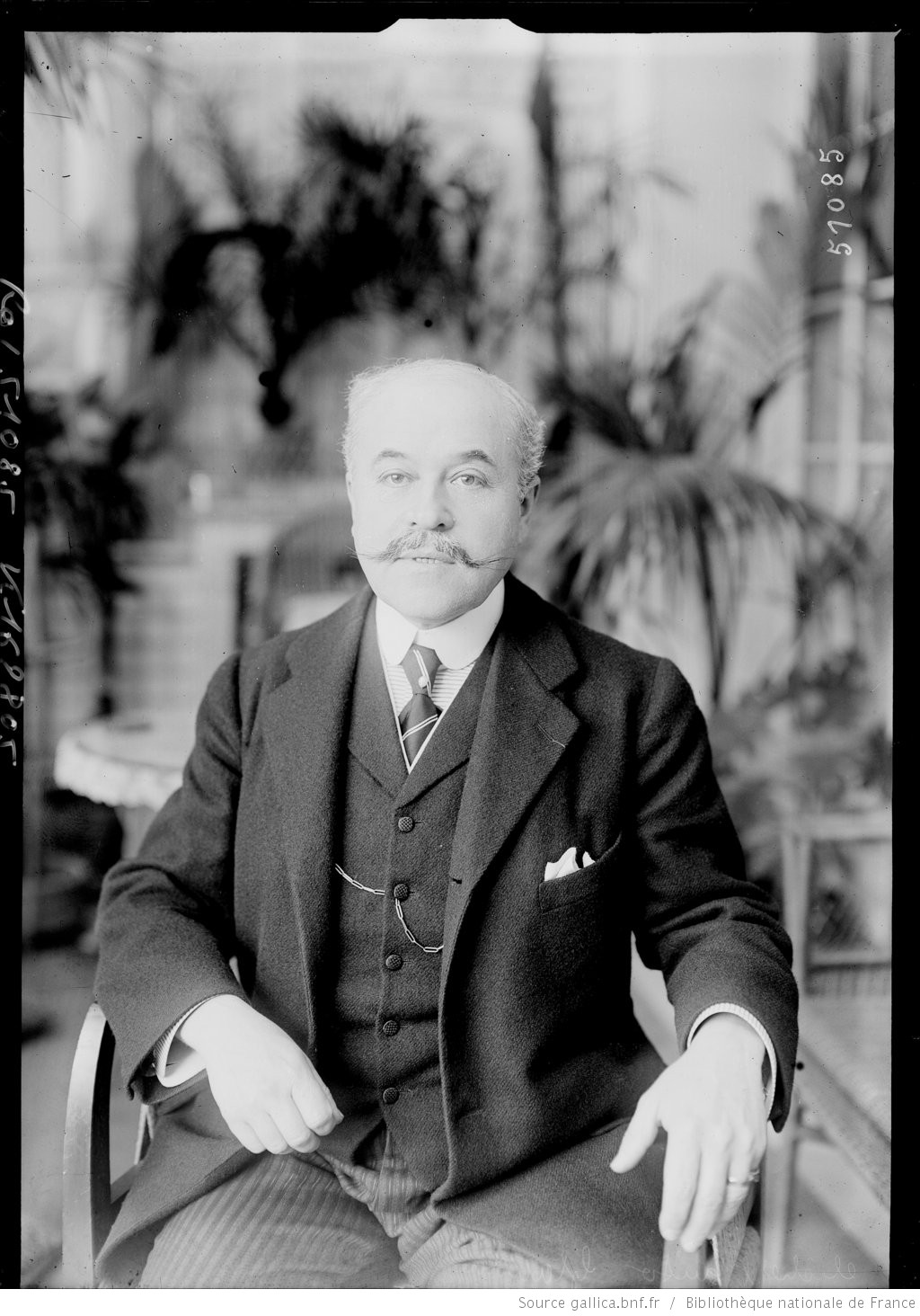
- Albert Glandaz in 1918

Personal information
- Full name: Albert Ernest Glandaz
- Born: 5 January 1870 Paris, Second French Empire
- Died: 22 March 1943 (aged 73) Paris, France

Sport

Sailing career
- Class(es): 0.5 to 1 ton Open class
- Club: CVP; Yacht Club de France

Albert Ernest Glandaz (5 January 1870 – 22 March 1943) was a French sailor who represented his country at the 1900 Summer Olympics in Meulan, France. As helmsman, Albert Glandaz took 13th place in first race of the 0.5 to 1 ton and did not finish in the second race. He did this with the boat Colette.
