= Jousset (surname) =

Jousset is a French surname. Notable people with the surname include:

- Frédéric Jousset (born 1970), French entrepreneur
- Marc Jousset, French Olympic sailor
