= Marcel Meran =

French sailor

Personal information
- Born: 4 October 1871 4 October 1871 Bordeaux
- Died: 9 April 1949 (aged 77) L'Isle-Adam, Val-d'Oise

Sailing career
- Sport: Sailing
- Club: CVP; Yacht Club de France
- Class(es): .5 to 1 ton Open class
Medal record
Sailing
Representing France
Olympic Games
Bronze medal – third place	1900 Paris	0.5 to 1 ton 1st race
Silver medal – second place	1900 Paris	0.5 to 1 ton 2nd race

Marcel Meran (4 October 1871 — 9 April 1947) was a French sailor, who represented his country at the 1900 Summer Olympics in Meulan, France. With Émile Michelet as helmsman, Meran took the 3rd place in the race of the .5 to 1 ton.
