= Marc Jousset =

French sailor

Personal information
- Nationality: French
- Born: 14 December 1878
- Died: 31 January 1956 (aged 77)

Sport

Sailing career
- Class: 0.5 to 1 ton
- Club: Sport Nautique de l'Ouest; Yacht Club de France

Marc Jousset (14 December 1878 – 31 January 1956) was a French sailor who represented his country at the 1900 Summer Olympics in Meulan, France. Marc Jousset as helmsman, took the 9th place in first race of the 0.5 to 1 ton and did not start in the second race. He did this with the boat Dick.
