= Jean de Chabannes la Palice =

French sailor

Personal information
- Full name: Jean Alfred Octave de Chabannes la Palice
- Born: 29 March 1871 Corrèze, France
- Died: 29 August 1933 (aged 62) Paris, France

Sport

Sailing career
- Class(es): 0.5 to 1 ton Open class
- Club: Union des Yachts Français

Count Jean Alfred Octave de Chabannes la Palice (29 March 1871 – 29 August 1933) was a French sailor, who represented his country at the 1900 Summer Olympics in Meulan, France. De Chabannes la Palice, as helmsman, took the 4th place in first race of the 0.5 to 1 ton.
