= Roosevelt (sailor) =

French sailor

Personal information
- Nationality: French

Sport

Sailing career
- Class(es): 0.5 to 1 ton Open class
- Club: CVP

Roosevelt was a French sailor who competed in the 1900 Summer Olympics in Meulan, France. Roosevelt as helmsman, did not start in first race of the 0.5 to 1 ton and did not finish in the second race. He did this with the boat Verveine.
