= Émile Michelet =

French sailor

Personal information
- Full name: Camille Émile Gaston Michelet
- Born: 16 July 1867 Paris, Second French Empire
- Died: 27 April 1935 (aged 67) Sartrouville

Sport

Sailing career
- Class(es): 0 to 0.5 ton 3 to 10 ton Open class
- Club: CVP
Medal record
Sailing
Representing France
Olympic Games
Bronze medal – third place	1900 Paris	Open class
Bronze medal – third place	1900 Paris	0.5 to 1 ton 1st race
Silver medal – second place	1900 Paris	0.5 to 1 ton 2nd race

Émile Michelet (16 July 1867 — 27 April 1935) was a French sailor who competed in the 1900 Summer Olympics in Meulan, France. With crewmember Marcel Meran, Michelet, as helmsman, took the 3rd place in the race of the 0.5 to 1 ton.
