= Phokion =

Phokion or Phocion may refer to:

- Phocion (c. 402 – c. 318 BC), Athenian statesman and strategos
- Phokion G. Kolaitis (born 1950), Greek computer scientist
- Phocion Rossollin (1837–1911), French sailor
- Phokion J. Tanos (1898–1972), a Cypriot dealer of antiques in Cairo
