= Phocion Rossollin =

French sailor

Personal information
- Born: 22 December 1837 Marseille, Kingdom of France
- Died: 20 June 1911 (aged 73) Paris, France

Sport

Sailing career
- Class(es): 0.5 to 1 ton Open class
- Club: CVP; Yacht Club de France

Phocion Rossollin (22 December 1837 – 20 June 1911) was a French sailor who competed in the 1900 Summer Olympics in Meulan, France. Rossollin as helmsman, took the 11th place in first race of the 0.5 to 1 ton and finished 8th in the second race. He did this with the boat Ariette.
