= Algernon Maudslay =

British sailor

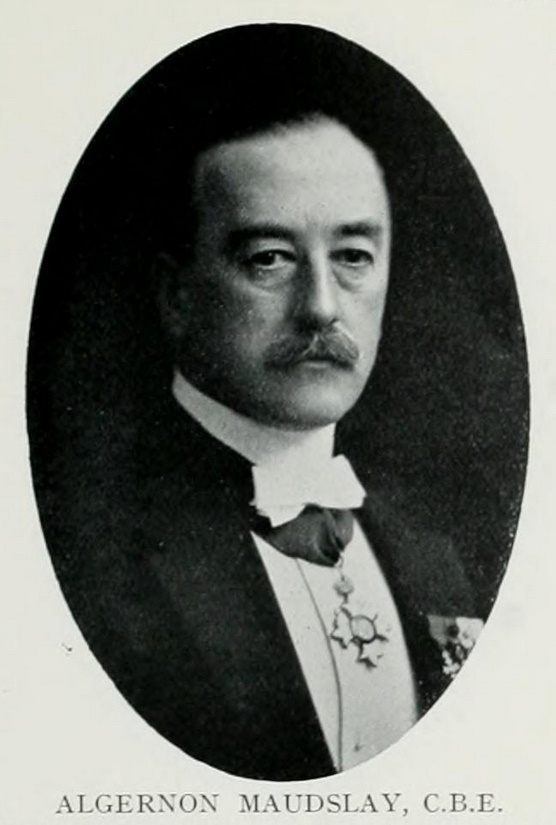
- Algernon Maudslay in about 1922.

Personal information
- Nationality: British
- Born: 10 January 1873 Tetbury, England
- Died: 2 March 1948 (aged 75) Winchester, England

Sailing career
- Sport: Sailing
- Classes: .5 to 1 ton Open class
Medal record
Sailing
Representing Great Britain
Olympic Games
Gold medal – first place	1900 Paris	Open class
Gold medal – first place	1900 Paris	.5 to 1 ton 1st race

Algernon Maudslay CBE (10 January 1873 – 2 March 1948) was a British yachtsman and an administrator of refugee, Red Cross and relief organisations. Maudslay represented Great Britain in sailing competitions at the 1900 Summer Olympics in Meulan, France. He was the helmsman of the yacht that won gold medals in the open event and the half- to one-ton class event. During World War I Maudslay was honorary secretary of the War Refugees Committee, supporting Belgian refugees who arrived in Britain. He was active in the Anglo-Belgian Union and served in British and international Red Cross and relief organizations during the post-war decades. Maudslay continued to compete in yachting events and held prominent positions as an administrator in yachting organisations.

== Biography ==
=== Early years ===
Algernon Maudslay was born on 10 January 1873 at 'Upton Grove', Tetbury, Gloucestershire, the son of Herbert and Marian Maudslay. His father was an engineer and a yachtsman. Young Algernon was "educated privately".

In the late 1890s Maudslay was engaged to the tennis player Ruth Legh, although the marriage did not eventuate. In February 1899 Ruth married the brewery managing director, Edward Winch.

=== The Olympics ===
At the time of the 1900 Olympics Maudslay was a prominent yachtsman, a member of the Seaview Yacht Club and the Royal Yacht Squadron on the Isle of Wight, as well as the Royal Thames Yacht Club and the Royal London Yacht Club.

Maudslay competed for Great Britain in the sailing competition at the 1900 Summer Olympics in Meulan, France. He competed as the helmsman aboard the Scotia. The team of sailors won two gold medals, in the open event and the half- to one-ton class event. The 'Open Class' (Concours d'Honneur) sailing event was held on 20 May 1900 over an eleven kilometre course in the River Seine, the first event of the 1900 Olympic sailing regatta. It was open to all yachts intending to compete in the five individual classes over the following days. Forty-nine yachts started the race, but only seven completed the course within the time limit due to an almost complete absence of wind. The gold medal for first place was awarded to the British boat Scotia, crewed by Maudslay as helmsman, and possibly also Lorne Currie and John Gretton.^{[A]} The 'Half- to One-Ton' sailing race was held on 24 May over a nineteen kilometre course, with thirty-two yachts competing. Once again the Scotia, with the same crew as in the open event, proved to be the superior boat, winning the event by almost ten minutes.

=== War refugees ===
The War Refugees Committee was formed in August 1914 after the German invasion of Belgium, to provide support and hospitality for the Belgian refugees who arrived in Britain. Maudslay was the honorary secretary of the organisation from January 1915 until it was disbanded in May 1919. In 1917 he was appointed a Commander of the Order of the British Empire in recognition of his service in the Belgian War Refugees Committee.

Maudslay was the prime mover in the formation of the Anglo-Belgian Union in July 1918 "to maintain and foster the friendly relations between the British and Belgian peoples that had sprung up during the war". He served as honorary secretary of the organisation.

=== Post-war years ===
For much of his life Maudslay was devoted to British and international Red Cross and relief organizations. He was the honorary director-general of the British Committee of the Russian Red Cross, organising assistance to Russian refugees after the Bolshevist revolution and during the Russian Civil War. Maudslay served as a member of the council of the British Red Cross Society.

In 1920 Maudslay joined a group called the 'Liberty League', described as an association "to combat the advance of Bolshevism in the United Kingdom and throughout the Empire". He was one of the signatories to a letter in The Times, published on 3 March 1920, calling for public support.^{[B]}

Maudslay, representing the Royal Thames Yacht Club, was the honorary secretary of a special committee formed to carry out the arrangements for a challenge received from the Seawanhaka Yacht Club of America, based on Staten Island, to race for the British-American Cup in The Solent, between the Isle of Wight and the mainland, in August 1921. The British-American Cup was a competition for yachts in the international six-metre class. Maudslay competed in regattas in yachts of the international six-metre class during the early 1920s.

Maudslay held the positions of director in Port Arthur (Ontario) Developments Ltd. and of the Rubber Company of Malay Ltd.

In 1927 Maudslay was appointed a Grand Officer of the Order of the Crown of Belgium in recognition of valuable services. He remained in the role of honorary secretary of the Anglo-Belgian Union until at least 1939.

At the time of his father's death in September 1926 Maudslay was living at 34 Park Mansions in Knightsbridge in London. His father, Herbert Charles Maudslay, died on 25 September 1926 at 'Worcester Lodge', Seaview, on the Isle of Wight.

In May 1936 Maudslay was appointed honorary treasurer of the Yacht Racing Association. He continued in that role until his death in 1948.

=== Death ===
Algernon Maudslay died on 2 March 1948 at 'The Down House', Itchen Abbas, near Winchester in Hampshire, aged 75. His funeral was held at St. Thomas' church in Winchester and a memorial service was held on 9 March at St. Paul's in Knightsbridge, London.

== Notes ==
A.The identity of the crew members of the Scotia have not been definitively determined. The records of the British Olympic Association list the crew as Linton Hope, Lorne Currie and John Gretton. However Hope, who was the designer of Scotia, was in England at the time of the Olympic races. Currie and Gretton were the owners of Scotia, though there is some doubt that they sailed their own boat in the competitions. The only crew-member whose participation has definitely been established is Algernon Maudslay, who was the helmsman of the vessel.

B.The other signatories to a letter were the writers H. Rider Haggard and Rudyard Kipling, as well as Lord Sydenham, Henry Bax-Ironside, John Hanbury Williams and Lieutenant Colonel G. Maitland Edwards.
