= Lorne Currie =

British sailor

Personal information
- Full name: Lorne Campbell Currie
- Nationality: British
- Born: 25 April 1871 Le Havre, France
- Died: 21 June 1926 (aged 55) Le Havre, France

Sailing career
- Sport: Sailing
- Club: Royal Temple Yacht Club; Société des Régates du Havre
- Class(es): .5 to 1 ton Open class
Medal record
Sailing
Representing Great Britain
Olympic Games
Gold medal – first place	1900 Paris	Open class
Gold medal – first place	1900 Paris	.5 to 1 ton 1st race
- Updated on 8 May 2015

Lorne Campbell Currie (25 April 1871 – 20 June 1926) was a British sailor who represented his country at the 1900 Summer Olympics in Meulan, France. With crew John Gretton, Linton Hope and Algernon Maudslay. Currie, as helmsman, took first place in race of the .5 to 1 ton. He was born and died in Le Havre, France. His father, John Martin Currie, was a younger brother of Donald Currie, the ship owner, and acted as agent for the firm in Le Havre.
