= Liberty League (historic) =

The Liberty League was a classical liberal British political organization, active in 1920–21. It was established by Rudyard Kipling, H. Rider Haggard, Lord Sydenham, Henry Bax-Ironside, John Hanbury Williams, Algernon Maudslay. Lieutenant Colonel G. Maitland Edwards served as Leagues organiser and treasurer. The League's express purpose was countering Bolshevism and advancing classical liberal ideas "in the United Kingdom and throughout the Empire." The League aimed exposure and "fight every effort to set up the tyranny of a minority over a majority."

The League's founding was announced on 3 March 1920 in an open letter published in The Times:

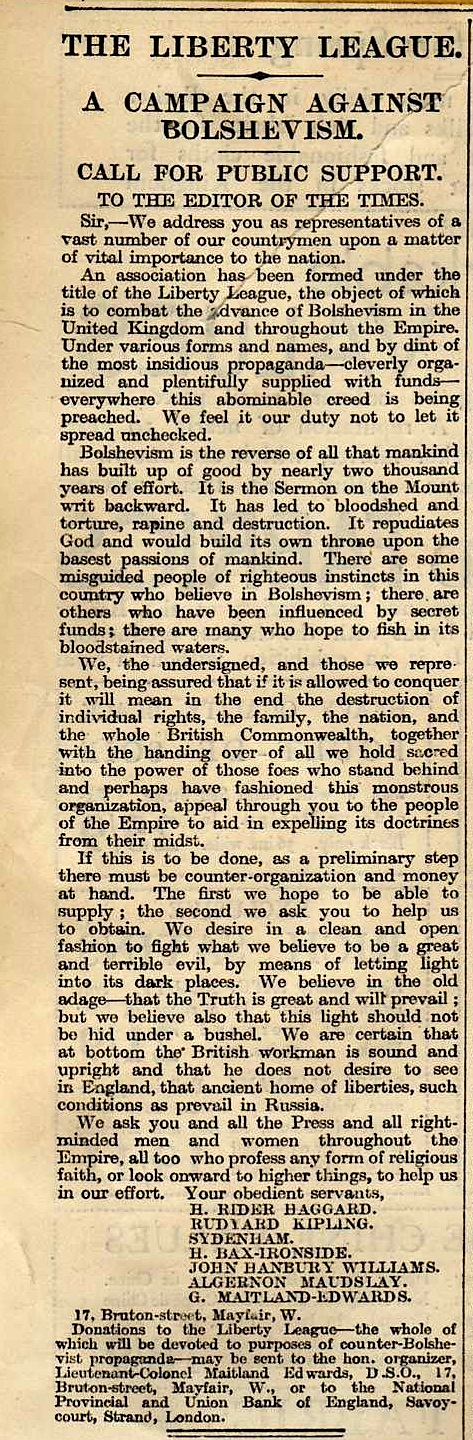

Bolshevism is the reverse of what mankind has built up of good by nearly two thousand years of effort. It is the Sermon of the Mount writ backward. It has led to bloodshed and torture, rapine and destruction. It repudiated God and would build its own throne upon the basest passions of mankind.

There are some misguided people of righteous instincts in this country who believe in Bolshevism; there are others who have been influenced by secret funds;

there are many who hope to fish in its bloodstained waters…If it is allowed to conquer it will mean in the end the destruction of individual rights, the family, the nation, and the whole British Commonwealth, together with the handing over of all we hold sacred into the power of those who stand behind and perhaps have fashioned this monstrous organization…

The first we hope to be able to supply; the second we ask you to help us obtain. We desire in a clean and open fashion to fight what we believe to be a great and terrible evil, by means of letting light into its dark places. We believe in the old adage---that the Truth is great and will prevail; but we believe also that this light should not be hid under a bushel. We are certain that at bottom the British workman is sound and upright and that he does not desire to see in England, that ancient home of liberties, such conditions as prevail in Russia.
