= François Vilamitjana =

French sailor

Personal information
- Full name: François Antoine Vilamitjana
- Born: 3 August 1846 Pau, France
- Died: 14 June 1928 (aged 81) Paris

Sport

Sailing career
- Class(es): 1 to 2 ton Open class
Medal record
Sailing
Representing France
Olympic Games
Silver medal – second place	1900 Paris	1 to 2 ton 1st race
Bronze medal – third place	1900 Paris	1 to 2 ton 2nd race

François Antoine Vilamitjana (3 August 1846 – 14 June 1928) was a French sailor who competed in the 1900 Summer Olympics. He was born in Pau. He was the helmsman of the French boat Martha 1, which won a silver and a bronze medal in the races of the 1 to 2 ton class. He also participated in the Open class with the boat Martha 27, but did not finish the race.
