= Charles Guiraist =

French sailor

Personal information
- Full name: Charles Guiraist
- Nickname: Charly
- Nationality: French
- Born: 31 May 1887 Bordeaux
- Died: 7 September 1947 (aged 60) Bordeaux

Sport

Sailing career
- Class(es): 3 to 10 ton Open class
Medal record
Sailing
Representing France
Olympic Games
Bronze medal – third place	1900 Paris	3 to 10 ton 1st race
Silver medal – second place	1900 Paris	3 to 10 ton 2nd race

Charles "Charly" Guiraist (31 May 1887 in Bordeaux – 7 September 1947 in Bordeaux) was a French sailor who competed in the 1900 Summer Olympics in Paris, France. Guiraist took the gold in the first race of the 3 to 10 ton and the silver medal in the second race of that class.
