= Louis Auguste-Dormeuil =

French sailor (1868–1951)

Personal information
- Full name: Louis Albert Auguste-Dormeuil
- Born: 25 August 1868 Croissy-sur-Seine, France
- Died: 8 October 1951 (aged 83) Saint-Germain-en-Laye, France

Sailing career
- Sport: Sailing
- Club: Union des Yachts Français
- Class(es): 0.5 to 1 ton Open class
Competition record
Sailing
Representing France
Olympic Games
Gold medal – first place	1900 Paris	0.5 to 1 ton 1st race

Louis Albert Auguste-Dormeuil (French pronunciation: [lwi oɡyst dɔʁmœj]; 25 August 1868 – 8 October 1951) was a French sailor who represented his country at the 1900 Summer Olympics in Meulan, France.

== Biography ==
Louis Auguste-Dormeuil competed in both races in the 0.5–1-ton sailboat class at the 1900 Summer Olympics. He won the gold medal in the second race and finished seventh in the first race.

He lived at 32 Rue La Boétie in Paris around 1910.

This fabric merchant was discharged due to “severe myopia and astigmatism” after one month of military service; his discharge was upheld during World War I.

His funeral was held at the Church of Saint-Germain in Saint-Germain-en-Laye.

Some of his Photography are housed at the Heritage and Photography Media Library.
