= Arthur Bloomfeld =

German sailor

Personal information
- Nationality: German

Sport

Sailing career
- Class: 0.5 to 1 ton
- Club: Leipziger Yachtclub

Arthur Bloomfeld was a German sailor who competed in the 1900 Summer Olympics.

He was the crew on the German boat Aschenbrödel. Arthur Bloomfeld participated in the ½–1 ton class, but the boat Aschenbrödel weighed in at 1.041 tons instead of less than 1 ton, and was disqualified.
