= Léon Susse =

French sailor

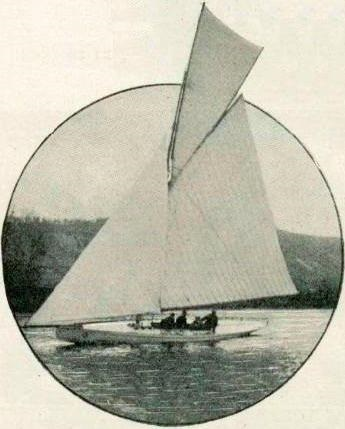
- Susse in "Favorite"

Personal information
- Full name: Léon Susse
- Born: Henri Léon Victor Susse; 23 September 1844 Paris, France
- Died: 16 April 1910 (aged 65) Paris, France

Sailing career
- Sport: Sailing
- Club: Cercle de la voile de Paris
- Class: 2 to 3 ton
Medal record
Sailing
Representing France
Olympic Games
Silver medal – second place	1900 Paris	2 — 3 ton 1st race
Silver medal – second place	1900 Paris	2 — 3 ton 2nd race

Henri Léon Victor Susse (23 September 1844 – 16 April 1910) was a French sailor who competed in the 1900 Summer Olympics. He was the helmsman of the French boat Favorite 1, which won two silver medals in the races of the 2 to 3 ton class. He also participated in the Open class, but did not finish the race.
