= Kevin Mendy =

French basketball player

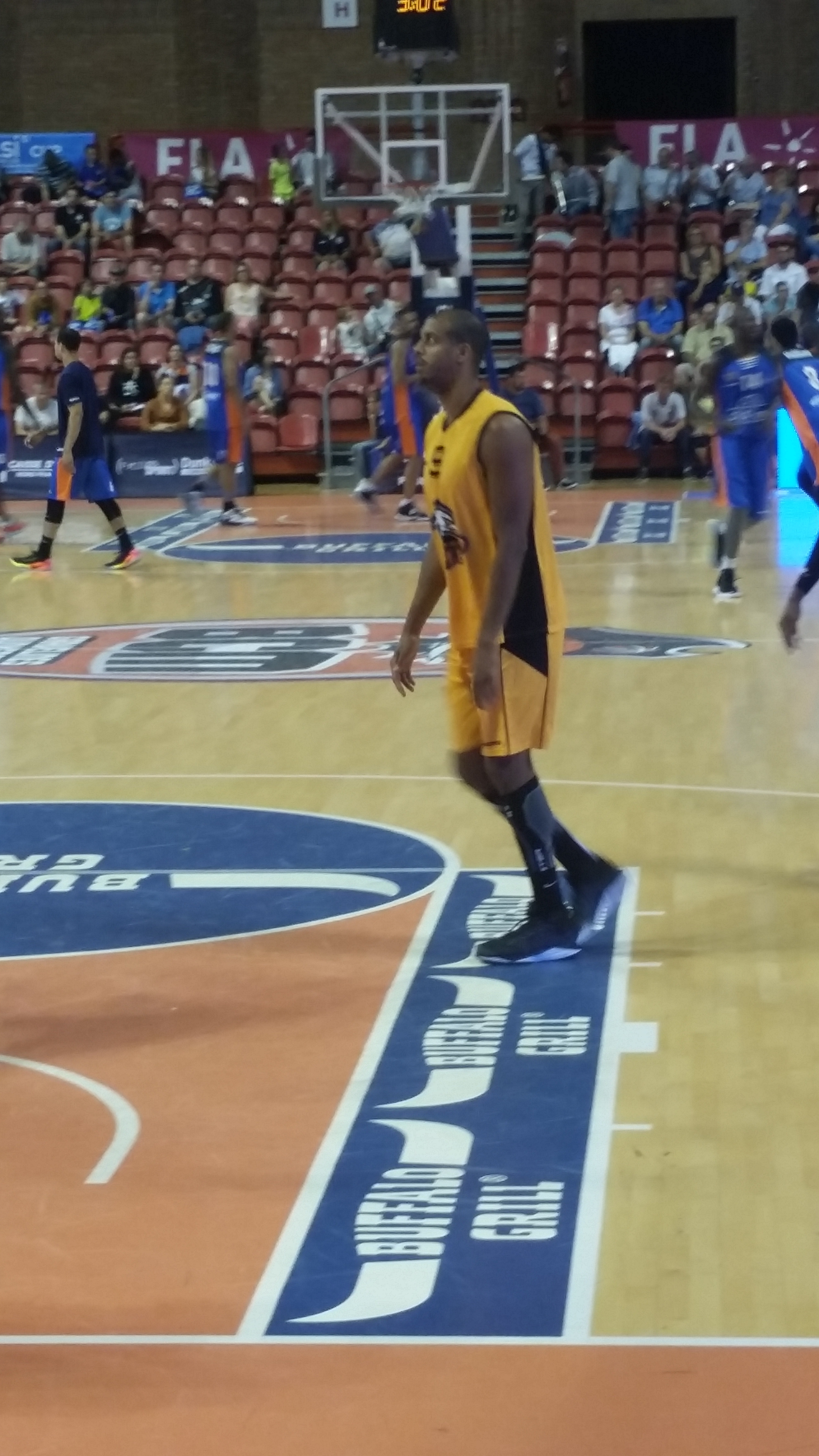
#9 Kevin Mendy

Kevin Mendy (born May 18, 1992) is a French basketball player who plays for French Pro A league club Le Mans. He was born in Meulan, France.
