= Auguste Godinet =

French sailor

Personal information
- Full name: Victor Auguste Godinet
- Nationality: French
- Born: 30 January 1853 Geneva, Switzerland
- Died: 1 March 1936 (aged 83) Lyon, France

Sport

Sailing career
- Class(es): 2 to 3 ton Open class
Medal record
Sailing
Representing France
Olympic Games
Silver medal – second place	1900 Paris	2 — 3 ton 1st race
Silver medal – second place	1900 Paris	2 — 3 ton 2nd race

Victor Auguste Godinet (30 January 1853 – 1 March 1936) was a French sailor who competed in the 1900 Summer Olympics. He was the crew member of the French boat Favorite 1, which won two silver medals in the races of the 2 to 3 ton class. He also participated in the Open class, but did not finish the race.
