= Jules Valton =

French sailor

Personal information
- Full name: Henri Jules Valton
- Born: 11 May 1867 Courson-les-Carrières, Second French Empire
- Died: 6 August 1941 (aged 74) Paris, Occupied France

Sport

Sailing career
- Class(es): 0.5 to 1 ton 10 to 20 ton Open class
- Club: CVP
Medal record
Sailing
Representing France
Olympic Games
Silver medal – second place	1900 Paris	0.5 to 1 ton 1st race
Bronze medal – third place	1900 Paris	0.5 to 1 ton 2nd race

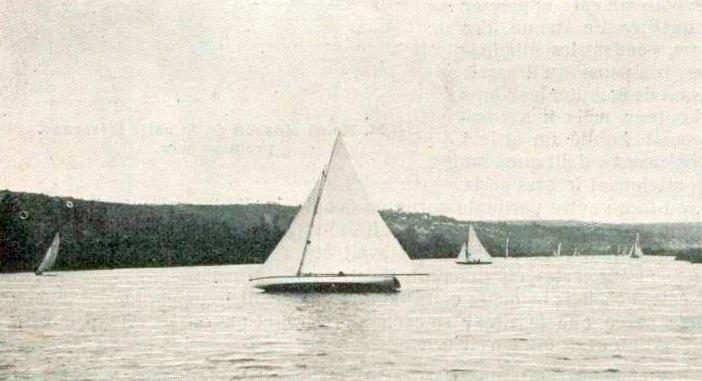
'Crabe II', the yacht of Count Chabannes La Palice, silver medal ½ – 1 ton during the 1900 Olympics.jpg

Henri Jules Valton (French pronunciation: [ʒyl valtɔ̃]; 11 May 1867 – 6 August 1941) was a French sailor who competed in the 1900 Summer Olympics in Meulan, France. With Jacques Baudrier as helmsman and fellow crewmembers William Martin, Félix Marcotte and Jean Le Bret, Valton took the 2nd place in the first race of the .5 to 1 ton and finished 3rd in the second race.
