= William Martin (Olympic sailor) =

French sailor (1828–1905)

Personal information
- Full name: Charles William Martin
- Born: 25 October 1828 Rouen, France
- Died: 25 February 1905 (aged 76) Paris, France

Sailing career
- Sport: Sailing
- Club: CVP; Yacht Club de France
- Class(es): 0.5 to 1 ton 3 to 10 ton Open class
Medal record
Sailing
Representing France
Olympic Games
Silver medal – second place	1900 Paris	0.5 to 1 ton 1st race
Bronze medal – third place	1900 Paris	0.5 to 1 ton 2nd race

Charles William Martin (French pronunciation: [wiljam maʁtɛ̃]; 25 October 1828 – 25 February 1905) was a French sailor who represented his country at the 1900 Summer Olympics in Meulan, France. With Jacques Baudrier as helmsman and fellow crewmembers Félix Marcotte, Jules Valton and Jean Le Bret Martin took the second place in the first race of the .5 to 1 ton and finished third in the second race.
