= Linton Hope =

British sailor

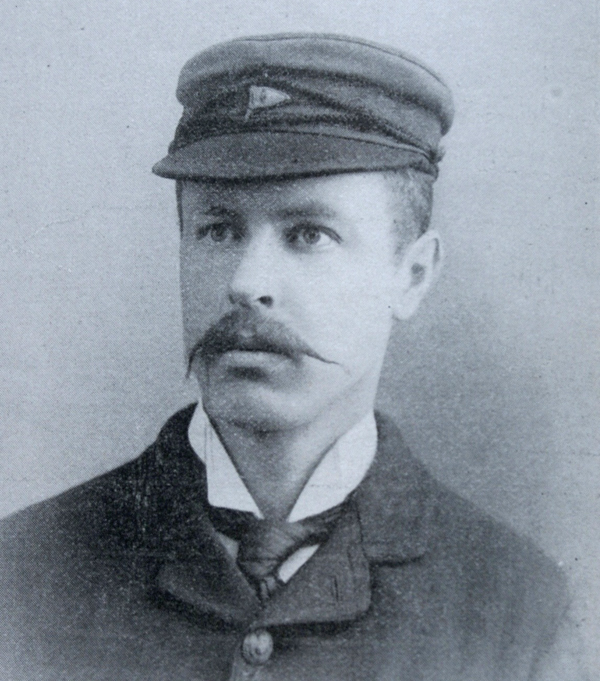

Personal information
- Full name: Linton Chorley Hopps
- Nationality: British
- Born: 19 April 1863 Bollington, England
- Died: 20 December 1920 (aged 57) Fernhurst, England

Sailing career
- Sport: Sailing
- Classes: .5 to 1 ton Open class
Medal record
Sailing
Representing Great Britain
Olympic Games
Gold medal – first place	1900 Paris	Open class
Gold medal – first place	1900 Paris	.5 to 1 ton 1st race
- Updated on 8 May 2015

Linton Chorley Hope FRAes (19 April 1863 – 20 December 1920) was a sailor from Great Britain, who represented his country at the 1900 Summer Olympics in Meulan, France. With Lorne Currie as helmsman and fellow crewmembers John Gretton and Algernon Maudslay, Hope took first places in both the race of the .5 to 1 ton class and the Open class.

== Personal life ==
Hope was born in Bollington, Cheshire on 19 April 1863 as Linton Chorley Hopps the son of Edwin Chorley Hopps and his wife Sarah Smith Hopps (née Herford). He later changed his surname to Hope. Hope married Mabel Ellington in 1898 and they had a son and a daughter, their son Eustace Jack Linton Hope was killed in action in 1941 as a group captain in the Royal Air Force. Hope died on 20 December 1920 at Fernhurst, Sussex.

== Professional life ==
Hope designed a variety of yachts, as well as the Fairy One Design for the North of Ireland Yacht Club, international canoes, Thames Raters, and Half Raters that were sent to India, specifically the Malabar, Nainital and Rangoon Yacht Clubs. Both Olympic races were won using the yacht Scotia designed by Hope. He was appointed naval architect to the King of the Belgians.

In 1915 Hope designed the AD Flying Boat for the British Admiralty's Air Department and his hull designs were used by a number of British flying boats in the 1920s including the Phoenix P.5 Cork and Fairey Titania, largest flying boat in the world at the time.
