= Félix Marcotte =

French sailor (1865–1953)

Personal information
- Full name: Félix Émile Marcotte
- Nationality: French
- Born: 12 June 1865 New York City, New York, US
- Died: 26 July 1953 (aged 88) Avon, Seine-et-Marne, France

Sailing career
- Sport: Sailing
- Club: CVP; Yacht Club de France
- Classes: 0.5 to 1 ton Open class
Medal record
Sailing
Representing France
Olympic Games
Silver medal – second place	1900 Paris	0.5 to 1 ton 1st race
Bronze medal – third place	1900 Paris	0.5 to 1 ton 2nd race

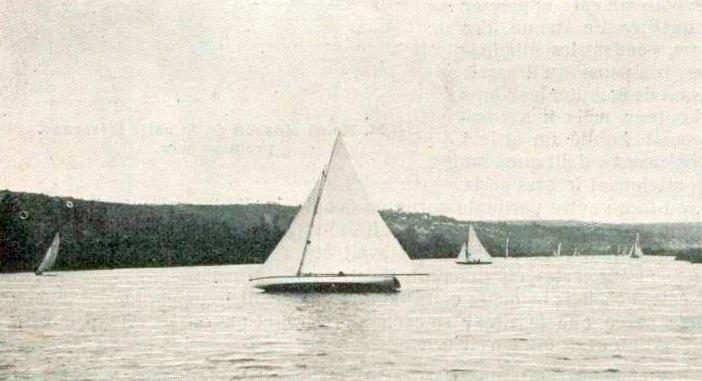
'Crab II', the yacht of Count Chabannes La Palice, silver medal ½ – 1 barrel at the 1900 Olympics.

Félix Émile Marcotte (French pronunciation: [feliks maʁkɔt]; 12 June 1865 – 26 July 1953) was an American-born French sailor who represented his country at the 1900 Summer Olympics in Meulan, France. With Jacques Baudrier as helmsman and fellow crewmembers William Martin, Jules Valton and Jean Le Bret, Marcotte took the 2nd place in the first race of the .5 to 1 ton and finished 3rd in the second race.
