= Jacques Baudrier =

French sailor (1872–1947)

Personal information
- Born: 4 May 1872 Paris, France
- Died: 24 April 1947 (aged 74) Le Castellet, France

Sailing career
- Sport: Sailing
- Club: CVP
- Class(es): 0.5 to 1 ton 1 to 2 ton Open class
Medal record
Sailing
Representing France
Olympic Games
Silver medal – second place	1900 Paris	0.5 to 1 ton 1st race
Bronze medal – third place	1900 Paris	0.5 to 1 ton 2nd race
Bronze medal – third place	1900 Paris	1 to 2 ton 1st race
- Updated on 8 May 2015

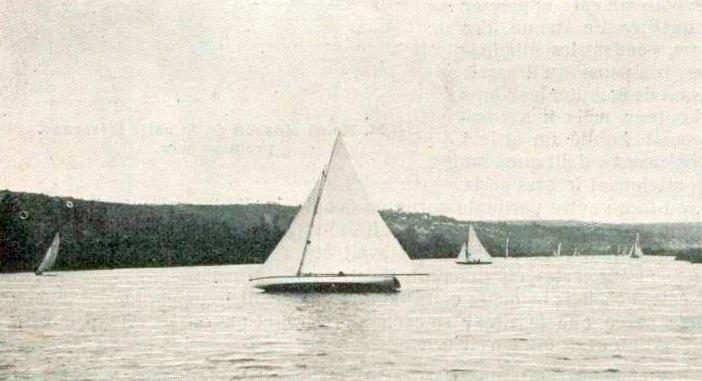
'Crab II', the yacht of Count Chabannes La Palice, silver medal ½ – 1 barrel at the 1900 Olympics.

Jacques Baudrier (French pronunciation: [ʒak bodʁije]; 4 May 1872 – 24 April 1947) was a French sailor who represented France at the 1900 Summer Olympics in Meulan, France, with crew Félix Marcotte, William Martin, Jules Valton and Jean Le Bret. Baudrier, as helmsman, took the second place in the first race of the 0.5 to 1 ton and finished third in the second race.

Baudrier also took, as helmsman, the bronze medal in the first race of the 1 to 2 ton and the 4th place in the second race of the 1 to 2 ton.

He was the cousin of fellow Olympian Lucien Baudrier.
