= Jean Le Bret =

French sailor (1872–1947)

Personal information
- Full name: Gabriel Charles Jean Le Bret
- Born: 26 October 1872 Paris, France
- Died: 23 December 1947 (aged 75) Paris, France

Sport

Sailing career
- Class(es): 0.5 to 1 ton Open class
- Club: CVP; Yacht Club de France
Medal record
Sailing
Representing France
Olympic Games
Silver medal – second place	1900 Paris	0.5 to 1 ton 1st race
Bronze medal – third place	1900 Paris	0.5 to 1 ton 2nd race

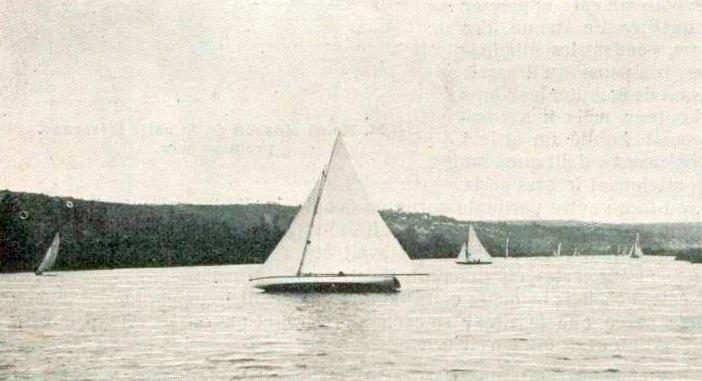
'Crab II', the yacht of Count Chabannes La Palice, silver medal ½ – 1 barrel at the 1900 Olympics.

Gabriel Charles Jean Le Bret (French pronunciation: [ʒɑ̃ l(ə) bʁɛ(t)]; 26 October 1872 – 23 December 1947) was a French sailor who represented his country at the 1900 Summer Olympics in Meulan, France. With Jacques Baudrier as helmsman and fellow crewmembers William Martin, Jules Valton and Félix Marcotte Le Bret took the second place in the first race of the .5 to 1 ton and finished third in the second race.

Entrepreneur Hélène Huby is his great-granddaughter.
