= Sailing at the Summer Olympics =

- IOC Code: SAL
- Governing body: World Sailing
- Events: 10 (men: 4; women: 4; mixed: 2)

Summer Olympics
- 1896; 1900; 1904; 1908; 1912; 1920; 1924; 1928; 1932; 1936; 1948; 1952; 1956; 1960; 1964; 1968; 1972; 1976; 1980; 1984; 1988; 1992; 1996; 2000; 2004; 2008; 2012; 2016; 2020; 2024; 2028; 2032
- Medalists

Sailing (also known as yachting until 2000) has been one of the Olympic sports since the Games of the I Olympiad, held in Athens, Greece, in 1896. Despite being scheduled in the first Olympic program, the races were canceled due to severe weather conditions. Apart from the 1904 Summer Olympics, sailing has been present in every edition of the Olympic Games.

- For the scoring system used for sailing events during the Olympics look at: Scoring systems for Sailing at the Summer Olympics
- A directory page to all Olympic sailors is given at: List of sailors at the Summer Olympics
- Information about the Sailing at specific Summer Olympics or the used equipment can be found using the table below:
- Gender – Until 1988, sailing was a gender neutral 'open' sport where male and female sailors competed together. Even in 1900, several women participated at the Olympic sailing regattas. The exception to this is the post-World War II 1948 Olympics where the IOC decided the events should only be open to male sailors. In 1988, the first exclusive women's sailing event was introduced. Sailing was also one of the first sports to introduce a compulsory mixed gender events in 2016 the Mixed Multihull was introduced.
- Discipline – Most of the Olympic sailing competitions were done in what is called a fleet race format. At some Olympics, however, was also the match race format, or a mixed fleet/match race format.
- Classes – Over time, different classes of boat featured at the Olympics. Initially, the classes were specified in tons, then later in meters, feet or generic names. For the discontinued classes, the Vintage Yachting Games were introduced in 2008.
- Medal Tables – Great Britain leads the Olympic sailing medal ranking table.

== Summary ==
Games	Year	Events	Best Nation
1	1896	—N/a (Note: Competitions were cancelled at the 1896 Olympics.)	
2	1900	13	France (1)
3			
4	1908	4	Great Britain (1)
5	1912	4	Norway (1)
6			
7	1920	14	Norway (2)
8	1924	3	Norway (3)
9	1928	3	Norway (4)
10	1932	4	United States (1)
11	1936	4	Germany (1)
12			
13			
14	1948	5	United States (2)
15	1952	5	United States (3)
16	1956	5	Sweden (1)
17	1960	5	Denmark (1)
18	1964	5	United Team of Germany (1)
19	1968	5	United States (4)
20	1972	6	Australia (1)
21	1976	6	West Germany (1)
22	1980	6	Brazil (1)
23	1984	7	United States (5)
24	1988	8	France (2)
25	1992	10	Spain (1)
26	1996	10	Brazil (2)
27	2000	11	Great Britain (2)
28	2004	11	Great Britain (3)
29	2008	11	Great Britain (4)
30	2012	10	Australia (2)
31	2016	10	Great Britain (5)
32	2020	10	Great Britain (6)
33	2024	10	Netherlands (1)
34	2028	10	

== Timeline ==
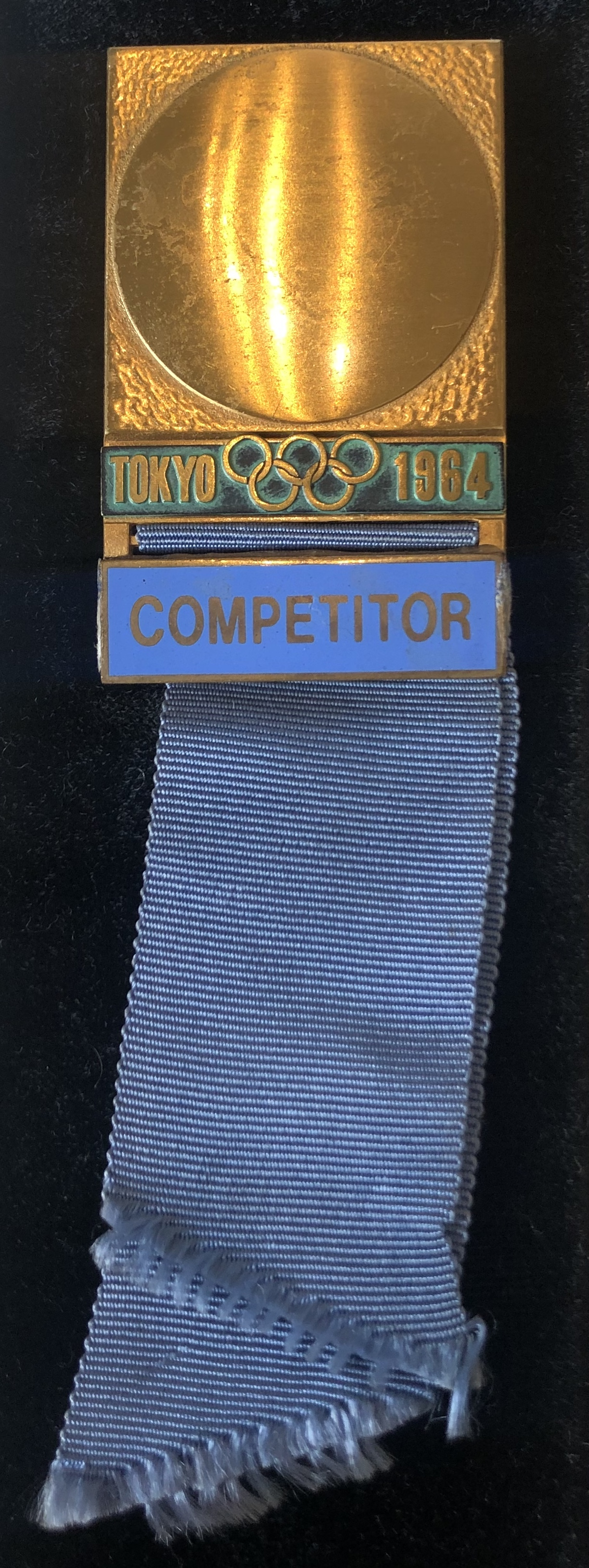
1964 Summer Olympic Games competitor medal awarded to Irish yachtsman Eddie Kelliher

- 1896: A regatta of sailing boats was on the program for 31 March 1896 in Athens. However this event had to be given up since there were no boats available from Greece and no foreign entries.
- 1900: Two venues were used to host the 1900 Sailing events. One in Meulan 20 May 1900 till 27 May 1900 for the inshore races on the river Seine. And one in Le Havre 1 August 1900 till 5 August 1900 for the Offshore races on the English Channel. In Meulan six classes were used over several days. About 55 boats and a little less than 150 sailors are documented, included the first female gold medalist Hélène de Pourtalès. In Le Havre two classes were used for the offshore event. About 10 boats made the competition. Crewmembers were not documented, just the owners and/or helmsmen.
- 1904: Sailing was not a part of the Olympic program.
- 1908: At the 1907 The Hague Conference of the IOC Ryde at the Isle of Wight was appointed to host the sailing regattas, for all classes, of the games of the IVth Olympiad. However, when there were only two British entries for the 12 Metre matches, and both yachts were located at the Firth of Clyde, the decision was made to use Hunters Quay as a second venue. In 1906 international meetings were organized to solve the problem of the differences in the performance of the different yachts. Finally in Paris, October 1907 the first International Rule was ratified. During the meeting in 1907 the IOC made the decision to use the International Rule classes for the Olympic regattas (6, 7, 8 and 12 Metre).
- 1912: When Sweden was assigned to host the 1912 Olympic Games two cities wanted to be the venue for the sailing program. Gothenburg and Stockholm. Gothenburg claimed that it was a much shorter passage for the overseas entries (about 525 nautical miles (972 km) less) than it was to Stockholm. Stockholm however got the sailing program because of then all Olympic events should be in the same vicinity. As specific location Nynäshamn, about 60 kilometres (37 mi) from Stockholm was chosen. Also the decision was made to use the International Rule classes again for the Olympic regattas (6, 8, 10 and 12 Metre).
- 1920: When Antwerp was assigned to host the 1920 Olympic Games, Ostend was appointed for the sailing contests. Ostend – "The Queen of the Belgian sea-side resorts" – offers fair condition for sailing on the North Sea. Although there are tidal conditions the current is reasonable predictable. Local knowledge does not have too much influence on the races. The wind conditions are also good for sailing. In the case of the 1920 Summer Olympic regatta's the prevailing breeze did not show. Most races had to be sailed under light air conditions. The competition was open for a total of sixteen classes. Two classes had a "No show".
- 1924: After the massive number of classes used four years earlier only three classes were selected for the 1924 Olympics. Again there was a one design class. The two other classes were construction classes of the International Metre type. Two locations were used: Meulan was the venue for the Olympic regatta's in the French National Monotype. The host club for the 1924 Olympic Sailing at Meulan was the Cercle de la Voile de Paris. The race conditions at Meulan during the Olympic regatta were not ideal. The light breeze during the first elimination series could hardly make the sailing interesting. Le Havre was the venue for the Olympic regattas for the 6 and 8 Metre. The host club for the 1924 Olympic Sailing at Le Havre was the Société des Régates du Havre. Due to the Easterly winds the courses at Le Havre were mostly reaches. Sailing a windward leg was not really tested. This however was more or less custom for that era. Furthermore, this was the first Olympic regatta were just one competing team per class per country was allowed.
- 1928: Like in the 1924 Olympics only three classes were chosen. There was the revival of the 12' Dinghy from the 1920 Olympics and again the proven 6 and 8 Metre classes. This Olympic sailing regatta can be considered as the first Olympic regatta with a high quality of racing since there were: Well selected classes that represented sailing; Sufficient competitors per class and good and fair sailing conditions. The only disadvantage was the daily passing of the Oranje Locks.

== Olympic Classes & Events ==
Over the years the classes used in the Olympic Sailing Program were replaced from time to time. This table shows this development:

Class	Disc	Gender	96	00	04	08	12	16	20	24	28	32	36	40	44	48	52	56	60	64	68	72	76	80	84	88	92	96	00	04	08	12	16	20	24	28	Sailed Events
Boats of the Royal Navy	Fleet	Male	(●)																																		0
0-½ ton	Fleet	Open		x2																																	2
½-1 ton	Fleet	Open		x2																																	2
1-2 ton	Fleet	Open		x2																																	2
2-3 ton	Fleet	Open		x2																																	2
3-10 ton	Fleet	Open		x2																																	2
10-20 ton	Fleet	Open		●																																	1
20+ ton	Fleet	Open		●																																	1
Open class	Fleet	Open		●																																	1
6 Metre (1907 Rule)	Fleet	Open				●	●		●																												10
6 Metre (1919 Rule)	Fleet	Open							●	●	●	●																									10
6 Metre (1933 Rule)	Fleet	Open											●	(●)			●																				10
6 Metre (1933 Rule)	Fleet	Male														●																					10
6.5 Metre	Fleet	Open							●																												1
7 Metre	Fleet	Open				●			●																												2
8 Metre (1907 Rule)	Fleet	Open				●	●		●																												8
8 Metre (1919 Rule)	Fleet	Open							●	●	●	●																									8
8 Metre (1933 Rule)	Fleet	Open											●																								8
8.5 Metre	Fleet	Open							(●)																												0
9 Metre	Fleet	Open							(●)																												0
10 Metre (1907 Rule)	Fleet	Open					●		●																												3
10 Metre (1919 Rule)	Fleet	Open							●																												3
12 Metre (1907 Rule)	Fleet	Open				●	●		●																												4
12 Metre (1919 Rule)	Fleet	Open							●																												4
15 Metre (1907 Rule)	Fleet	Open				(●)																															0
12 foot dinghy	Fleet	Open							●		●			(●)																							2
18 foot dinghy	Fleet	Open							●																												1
30m^{2} class	Fleet	Open							●																												1
40m^{2} class	Fleet	Open							●																												1
French National Monotype 1924	Fleet	Open								●																											1
Snowbird	Fleet	Open										●																									1
Star	Fleet	Open										●	●	(●)			●	●	●	●	●	●		●	●	●	●	●	●								18
Star	Fleet	Male														●														●	●	●					18
O-Jolle	Fleet	Open											●																								1
Dragon	Fleet	Open															●	●	●	●	●	●															7
Dragon	Fleet	Male														●																					7
Swallow	Fleet	Male														●																					1
Firefly	Fleet	Male														●																					1
Finn	Fleet	Open															●	●	●	●	●	●	●	●	●						●						18
Finn	Fleet	Male																								●	●	●	●	●		●	●	●			18
5,5 Metre	Fleet	Open															●	●	●	●	●																5
Sharpie 12m^{2}	Fleet	Open																●																			1
Flying Dutchman	Fleet	Open																	●	●	●	●	●	●	●	●	●										9
Soling	Fleet	Open																				●	●	●	●	●											8
Soling	Fleet/ Match	Open																									●	●	●								8
Tempest	Fleet	Open																				●	●														2
Tornado	Fleet	Open																					●	●	●	●	●	●	●	●	●						9
470	Fleet	Open																					●	●	●												23
470	Fleet	Male																								●	●	●	●	●	●	●	●	●			23
470	Fleet	Female																								●	●	●	●	●	●	●	●	●			23
470	Fleet	Mixed																																	●	●	23
Windglider	Fleet	Open																							●												1
Division II	Fleet	Open																								●											1
Lechner	Fleet	Male																									●										2
Lechner	Fleet	Female																									●										2
Europe	Fleet	Female																									●	●	●	●							4
Mistral	Fleet	Open																										●	●	●							6
Mistral	Fleet	Female																										●	●	●							6
ILCA 7 (Laser)	Fleet	Open																										●	●	●							9
ILCA 7 (Laser)	Fleet	Male																													●	●	●	●	●	●	9
ILCA 6 (Laser Radial)	Fleet	Female																													●	●	●	●	●	●	6
49er	Fleet	Open																											●	●							8
49er	Fleet	Male																													●	●	●	●	●	●	8
49er FX	Fleet	Female																															●	●	●	●	4
Yngling	Fleet	Female																												●	●						2
RS:X	Fleet	Male																													●	●	●	●			8
RS:X	Fleet	Female																													●	●	●	●			8
Elliott 6m	Match	Female																														●					1
Nacra 17	Fleet	Mixed																															●	●	●	●	4
iQFoil	Fleet	Male																																	●	●	4
iQFoil	Fleet	Female																																	●	●	4
Formula Kite	Fleet	Male																																	●	●	4
Formula Kite	Fleet	Female																																	●	●	4
Total			(1)	13	0	4 (5)	4		14 (16)	3	3	4	4	(3)		5	5	5	5	5	5	6	6	6	7	8	10	10	11	11	11	10	10	10	10	10	215
Class			96	00	04	08	12	16	20	24	28	32	36	40	44	48	52	56	60	64	68	72	76	80	84	88	92	96	00	04	08	12	16	20	24	28	Sailed Events

Gender Criteria: Open events have no gender requirements where as mixed events require male and female competitors
Events Notes: Events in "()" Brackets were scheduled but did not take place and therefore not included in the totals

== Boat types ==
Boat type	96	00	04	08	12	16	20	24	28	32	36	40	44	48	52	56	60	64	68	72	76	80	84	88	92	96	00	04	08	12	16	20	24	28	Sailed Events
Dinghy / Centreboard							●	●	●	●	●	●		●	●	●	●	●	●	●	●	●	●	●	●	●	●	●	●	●	●	●	●	●	27
Skiff (dinghy type)																											●	●	●	●	●	●	●	●	6
Keelboats							●			●	●	●		●	●	●	●	●	●	●	●	●	●	●	●	●	●	●	●	●					21
Yachts / Sail cruisers	●	●		●	●		●	●	●	●	●	●		●	●																				11
Multihull (dinghy-sized)																					●	●	●	●	●	●	●	●	●		●	●	●	●	11
Sailboard (windsurfing)																							●	●	●	●	●	●	●	●	●	●	●	●	12
Kiteboard (kitesurfing)																																	●	●	2
One-Design / Monotype							?	●	?	●	●	●		●	●	●	●	●	●	●	●	●	●	●	●	●	●	●	●	●	●	●	●	●	25
Construction class Development class	?	?		●	●		●	●	●	●	●	●		●	●	●	●	●	●																14

== Race types ==
Race type	96	00	04	08	12	16	20	24	28	32	36	40	44	48	52	56	60	64	68	72	76	80	84	88	92	96	00	04	08	12	16	20	24	28	Editions
Fleet	●	●		●	●		●	●	●	●	●	●		●	●	●	●	●	●	●	●	●	●	●	●	●	●	●	●	●	●	●	●	●	31
Match																														●W					1
Combined FRQ+MR																									●	●	●								3
Relay																																			0

== Olympic sailing venues ==
Pictures will be replaced by more relevant photos.

Edition	Year	Host	City	Sailing venue	Opening	Closing	View	Classes
I	1896	Greece	Athens	Piraeus	1-APR	1-APR		Cancelled
II	1900	France	Paris	Meulan	20-MAY	27-MAY		All, except ...
II	1900	France	Paris	Le Havre	1-AUG	5-AUG		10–20 ton
III	1904	United States	St. Louis	Not programmed				
IV	1908	Great Britain	London	Ryde	27-JUL	29-JUL		6 Metre; 7 Metre; 8 Metre
IV	1908	Great Britain	London	Hunter's Quay	11-AUG	12-AUG		12 Metre
V	1912	Sweden	Stockholm	Nynäshamn	19-JUL	22-JUL		All
VI	1916	Germany	Berlin	Probably not programmed				
VII	1920	Belgium	Antwerp	Ostend	7-JUL	10-JUL		All, except...
VII	1920	Belgium	Antwerp	The Netherlands	SEP	SEP		Finals 12 foot dinghy
VIII	1924	France	Paris	Meulan	10-JUL	13-JUL		French National Monotype 1924
VIII	1924	France	Paris	Le Havre	21-JUL	26-JUL		6 Metre; 8 Metre
IX	1928	Netherlands	Amsterdam	Durgerdam	2-AUG	9-AUG		All
X	1932	United States	Los Angeles	Port of Los Angeles	5-AUG	12-AUG		All
XI	1936	Germany	Berlin	Kiel	4-AUG	16-AUG		All
XII	1940	Japan	Tokyo	Yokohama harbour	21-SEP	6-OCT		All; Cancelled
XII	1940	Finland	Helsinki	Program not made				Cancelled
XIII	1944	Olympics suspended						
XIV	1948	Great Britain	London	Torquay	4-AUG	12-AUG		All
XV	1952	Finland	Helsinki	Harmaja	20-JUL	28-JUL		All
XVI	1956	Australia	Melbourne	Port Phillip Bay	26-NOV	5-DEC		All
XVII	1960	Italy	Rome	Naples	29-AUG	7-SEP		All
XVIII	1964	Japan	Tokyo	Enoshima	12-OCT	23-OCT		All
XIX	1968	Mexico	Mexico City	Acapulco	13-OCT	25-OCT		All
XX	1972	West Germany	Munich	Kiel	29-AUG	8-SEP		All
XXI	1976	Canada	Montreal	Kingston, Ontario	18-JUL	31-JUL		All
XXII	1980	Soviet Union	Moscow	Tallinn, Estonian Soviet Socialist Republic	21-JUL	29-JUL		All
XXIII	1984	United States	Los Angeles	Long Beach, California	31-JUL	8-AUG		All
XXIV	1988	South Korea	Seoul	Busan	20-SEP	27-SEP		All
XXV	1992	Spain	Barcelona	Barcelona	27-JUL	4-AUG		All
XXVI	1996	United States	Atlanta	Savannah, Georgia	22-JUL	2-AUG		All
XXVII	2000	Australia	Sydney	Sydney	17-SEP	30-SEP		All
XXVIII	2004	Greece	Athens	Athens	14-AUG	28-AUG		All
XXIX	2008	China	Beijing	Qingdao	9-AUG	21-AUG		All
XXX	2012	Great Britain	London	Weymouth and Portland	28-JUL	11-AUG		All
XXXI	2016	Brazil	Rio de Janeiro	Rio de Janeiro	8-AUG	18-AUG		All
XXXII	2020	Japan	Tokyo	Enoshima	25-JUL 2021	4-AUG 2021		All
XXXIII	2024	France	Paris	Marseille	28-JUL	8-AUG		All
XXXIV	2028	United States	Los Angeles	Long Beach and Los Angeles	16-JUL	28-JUL		All

== Medal table ==
Updated as of Paris 2024 Olympics.

Overall Medal Total by Nation
Rank	Nation	Gold	Silver	Bronze	Total
1	Great Britain	31	21	13	65
2	United States	19	23	20	62
3	France	17	15	21	53
4	Norway	17	11	5	33
5	Australia	14	9	8	31
6	Spain	14	5	3	22
7	Denmark	13	10	9	32
8	Sweden	10	15	14	39
9	Netherlands	10	9	11	30
10	New Zealand	9	9	7	25
11	Brazil	8	3	8	19
12	Italy	6	3	8	17
13	Austria	5	4	1	10
14	Soviet Union	4	5	3	12
15	Germany	3	5	7	15
16	China	3	3	2	8
17	Greece	3	2	3	8
18	Belgium	2	4	3	9
19	Finland	2	2	7	11
20	West Germany	2	2	3	7
21	East Germany	2	2	2	6
22	Israel	2	1	2	5
23	Argentina	1	5	5	11
24	Ukraine	1	2	2	5
25	Switzerland	1	2	1	4
26	Croatia	1	2	0	3
27	Poland	1	1	3	5
28	United Team of Germany	1	1	1	3
29	Bahamas	1	0	1	2
30	Hong Kong	1	0	0	1
31	Canada	0	3	6	9
32	Slovenia	0	3	1	4
33	Portugal	0	2	2	4
34	Japan	0	2	1	3
35	Cyprus	0	2	0	2
35	Ireland	0	2	0	2
37	Hungary	0	1	1	2
37	Russia	0	1	1	2
39	Cuba	0	1	0	1
39	Czech Republic	0	1	0	1
39	Lithuania	0	1	0	1
39	Netherlands Antilles	0	1	0	1
39	Virgin Islands	0	1	0	1
44	Estonia	0	0	2	2
45	Peru	0	0	1	1
45	Russian Empire	0	0	1	1
45	Singapore	0	0	1	1
Totals (47 entries)		204	197	190	591

== Nations ==
This table is based upon the names of the sailors who are documented in the Official Olympic Reports.

The last column shows the total number of competitors sent from each country.

Nation	96	00	04	08	12	20	24	28	32	36	48	52	56	60	64	68	72	76	80	84	88	92	96	00	04	08	12	16	20	24	Years	
Netherlands Antilles																					1	2	2	1							6	
Algeria																												3	2	1	5	
Andorra																						2	3								5	
Angola																						3						3	2	3	8	
Antigua and Barbuda																				1	1	5	1	1					1	1	10	
Argentina							6	5		11	18	14	6	9	6	6	9	4		8	11	7	10	11	11	10	8	13	11	7	194	
Aruba																						1						3		2	4	
American Samoa																							2						2		4	
Australia									1		3	6	10	13	11	11	13	12		13	13	13	16	18	18	17	13	11	11	12	223	
Austria								1		1	5	3	1	7	3	3	12	9	5	10	8	13	6	5	7	11	8	8	8	9	134	
Bahamas												7	3	11	8	6	8	1		3	2	2	3								54	
Barbados																				2	4	5	2	1		1					15	
Belgium				3		14	9	6		3	12	4	1	3	1	3	4	3		1		5	3	4	4	3	3	4	4	8	97	
Bermuda													3	9	4	4	7	6		3	2	7	4	3	5		2	2		1	61	
Burma													2	3																	5	
Belarus																							6	4	1	4	2	2	2		21	
Botswana																				1											1	
Brazil										1	7	6	2	5	5	5	10	8	12	12	16	17	14	12	14	12	9	15	13	12	195	
Bahrain																							4		1						5	
Bulgaria																			5					1	2	1	2				11	
British West Indies														2																	2	
Cambodia															3																3	
Canada							1		13	1	5	11	7	11	11	11	10	10		13	15	17	16	9	11	14	11	9	9	6	215	
Cayman Islands																		2		2		3	7	1				1		1	16	
Ceylon																1															1	
Chile										1										5	3	1	1		1	1	3	9		2	25	
China																				4	5	3	5	4	4	18	9	8	13	13	73	
Colombia																		2								1	2	1		1	6	
Cook Islands																							1	1			1	2			5	
Croatia																						3	3	4	4	10	12	8	4	6	48	
Cuba							3				2	3	2	2					3				2	2							19	
Cyprus							1												5		2	2	3	2	3	4	2	2	4	4	30	
Czech Republic								1															2	2	4	4	4	3	1	3	21	
Denmark					3		4	5		7	13	7	4	9	9	11	11	8	9	8	14	16	11	12	14	6	13	11	8	9	213	
Djibouti																					1	1	2								4	
Dominican Republic																				1						1					2	
Ecuador																							1								1	
Egypt																				1							1	1	2	2	5	
El Salvador																3												1	1	1	5	
Spain							4	6	1		4	1		11	1	8	7	8	7	8	16	17	16	17	18	16	14	14	15	13	209	
Estonia								5		1												4	4	4	1	2	5	5	2	2	33	
Fiji													1							4	5	4	6	1					1	2	22	
Finland					27		1	1		12	14	14	3	9	5	3	7	8	7	5	5	8	8	10	4	9	11	8	5	4	184	
France		451		3	3	3	9	13	3	14	17	9	7	11	3	9	11	10		11	13	17	13	12	18	18	16	15	14	14	723	
Great Britain		73		41		6	6	8	3	14	13	14	11	11	9	11	13	12		13	15	17	16	16	18	18	16	15	15	14	404	
Georgia																							2								2	
Germany		12						6	1																						19	
Germany										14																					14	
Germany												14																			14	
United Team of Germany													8	11	11																30	
East Germany																8	11	6	12		9										46	
West Germany																11	13	12		13	15										64	
Germany																						15	15	17	17	12	12	12	10	14	110	
Greece											4	3	1	8	4	6	6	6	4	7	8	9	14	11	18	12	11	7	8	4	147	
Guatemala																		2	1	1			1			1	2	1	2	1	11	
Guam																					2	2	3	1							8	
Hong Kong															4	5	4			1	4	4	7	2	2	2	2	2	3	5	42	
Hungary								6		1				5	1	4	5	1	7		3	8	12	6	7	3	3	5	4	2	81	
Independent Olympic Athletes																											1				1	
India														2			3			2	2	2			2	1			4	2	18	
Indonesia														3		3					2		1	1	1	1					12	
Ireland											5	1	1	6	4		8	6	2	1	5	5	10	4	9	6	8	6	3	4	90	
Iceland																				2	2			1	1						6	
Israel																	2	2		5	4	5	5	6	6	7	7	6	5	8	60	
Virgin Islands																3	8	6		9	6	7	2	2	1	1	2	1			48	
Italy							8	12	1	14	15	14	11	11	10	8	10	12	6	11	15	13	16	18	18	18	11	13	9	12	274	
British Virgin Islands																				5	1	3	1							1	10	
Jamaica															3	5	3					2	2	2							17	
Japan										3		1		6	11		3	5		8	13	7	10	10	10	9	9	11	15	7	131	
Kenya														3	1																4	
Kyrgyzstan																											1				1	
South Korea																				1	10	3	5	5	4	4	4	4	4	1	44	
Kuwait																														1	1	
Latvia								1														2	2	2	1			1			9	
Saint Lucia																							1				1	1	2	1	5	
Lebanon														3																	3	
Lithuania																						2		1	1	1	3	2	2	2	12	
Luxembourg																										1					1	
Morocco														1										1							2	
Malaysia																							1	1	1	1	1	2	4	2	11	
Mexico														2	11	11	6	3		6	4	3	2	4	3	3	3	3	4	2	68	
Malta														3						1	1	2	2	1	1						11	
Montenegro																											1	1	1	1	3	
Monaco							1	1				2		3				3			2						1				13	
Mozambique																													3	1	3	
Mauritius																						1								2	1	
Netherlands		9				8	4	12	3	8	8	9		6	6	6	5	9	12	8	12	14	12	9	14	12	11	11	10	11	218	
Norway				5	18	59	9	10		14	13	12	6	9	9	11	13	6		7	7	14	8	9	8	9	6	6	8	5	276	
New Zealand													4	3	3	3	9	8		11	13	17	16	18	12	9	15	12	10	12	163	
Oman																				1											1	
Pakistan																				6	2	2									10	
Paraguay																							1			1					2	
Peru																								1	1	1	1	2	5	3	11	
Philippines														3	3	1	3	3		1	2	4									20	
Papua New Guinea																					1	1							2		4	
Poland							1			6						3	11	1	12		2	4	6	9	9	11	11	7	9	10	102	
Portugal							1	6		3	9	9	5	11	6	8	6	2		3	3	8	9	9	7	8	13	5	5	4	136	
Puerto Rico															1	6	5	9		6	3	4	3	2	3				2	1	44	
Qatar																					1		1								2	
Rhodesia														2	3																5	
Romania																			5				2							1	8	
South Africa							1	1	3		1	4	5	3								11	5	2	1	3	2	3	3		48	
Russian Empire					17																										17	
Soviet Union												14	10	11	11	11	13	12	12		15										109	
Unified Team																						14									14	
ROC																													6		6	
Russia																							12	12	13	10	10	7			64	
Samoa																													1	2	1	
Senegal																				1											1	
Seychelles																						1	2	3	1	1		3	1		12	
Singapore													5	3						1	2	2	4	3	1	6	2	10	4	2	43	
Slovenia																						3	5	5	7	6	4	3	3	6	36	
San Marino																				1	1		1								3	
Sri Lanka																				2				1							3	
Switzerland		9					1	1		6	13	11		11	7	9	10	6	8	9	9	10	5	8	8	9	6	9	6	7	171	
Slovakia																							4	1	1	1				1	7	
Sweden				13	41	11	4	11	7	15	15	14	7	11	11	8	13	12	10	13	15	15	15	17	10	11	14	7	9	8	329	
Czechoslovakia										1					1		1		3			3									9	
Thailand													2	2	4	4	3	2		1	1	2	1	3	1	2	3	4	3	4	38	
Chinese Taipei																	1			2			3	1		1	1	1			10	
Trinidad and Tobago															2		2			1							1	1	1		8	
Tunisia																						1			1		1	4	4		11	
Turkey										3				1	3					2	2	2	5	4	5	6	5	6	8	8	52	
United Arab Emirates																										1					1	
Ukraine																							12	11	10	6	4	3			46	
Uruguay										1	4	1		3		1				3	5	3	2	1	2	1	2	4	3	3	36	
United States		16						11	22	14	16	19	12	10	11	11	13	12		13	15	17	16	18	18	18	16	15	13	13	326	
Venezuela														2	3	4				2	1		1	1	1	3	2	2	1		23	
Yugoslavia										1		3		3		2	3	1	3	1											17	
Zimbabwe																			3	1	1										5	
Mixed team		9																													9	
Sailors		579		65	110	101	74	129	58	169	216	230	140	287	223	247	315	250	153	298	373	442	458	402	400	400	380	380	350	330		7229
Sailors – Male		577		63	110	101	73	127	58	166	216	228	140	287	223	247	315	250	153	296	330	360	358	308	261	261	237	257	175	165		6177
Sailors – Female		2		2	0	0	1	2	0	3	0	2	0	0	0	0	0	0	0	2	43	82	100	94	139	139	143	123	175	165		1052
Sailors – First Games																																
Countries		7	65	5	6	6	19	22	11	26	23	29	28	47	40	40	42	40	23	60	60	68	78	69	61	62	63	66	64	65		40 Mean
New countries		7		3	3	0	10	5	1	8	2	3	7	11	5	5	2	3	3	14	5	11	12	1	0	2	3	1	3	0		131
Events Held		13		4	4	14	3	3	4	4	5	5	5	5	5	5	6	6	6	7	8	10	10	11	11	11	10	10	10	10		205 Gold Medals
Boats		162		13	20	6	32	41	23	59	75	93	71	138	109	123	151	127	83	171	214	271	312	273	268	272	273	274	250	252		4156
Average class size		10		3.3	6	1.7	10.3	13.7	5.8	14.8	15	18.6	14.2	27.6	21.8	24.6	25.17	21.17	13.83	24.43	26.75	27.1	31.2	24.82	24.36	24.73	27.3	27.4	25	25,2		20 Mean
Average team size		1.3		5	4.6	4.3	2.3	3.3	2.3	2.9	2.9	2.4	2.2	6.11	5.58	6.18	7.5	6.25	6.65	4.97	6.22	5.15	5.87	5.83	6.56	6.45	6.03	5.76	5.47	5.08		5 Mean

- Early Olympic do not have complete data so some assumption on crew sizes and gender have been made to give a better indication of the number of people involved.

== Multiple gold medalists ==
Briton Ben Ainslie and Brazilians Torben Grael and Robert Scheidt are the only Olympic sailors with five Olympic medals. The most successful sailor is Ainslie with four gold medals and one silver, one of only four athletes to win four consecutive gold medals in individual events.

Position	Sailor	Country	Period	Gold	Silver	Bronze	Total	Classes
1	Ben Ainslie	Great Britain	1996–2012	4	1	0	5	ILCA 7 (Laser)/Finn
2	Paul Elvstrøm	Denmark	1948–1960	4	0	0	4	Firefly/Finn
3	Jochen Schümann	East Germany; Germany	1976–2000	3	1	0	4	Finn/Soling
3	Valentin Mankin	Soviet Union	1968–1980	3	1	0	4	Finn/Tempest/Star
5	Robert Scheidt	Brazil	1996–2012	2	2	1	5	ILCA 7 (Laser)/Star
6	Torben Grael	Brazil	1984–2004	2	1	2	5	Soling/Star
7	Marit Bouwmeester	Netherlands	2012–2024	2	1	1	4	ILCA 6 (Laser)
8	Hannah Mills	Great Britain	2012–2020	2	1	0	3	470
8	Iain Percy	Great Britain	2000–2012	2	1	0	3	Finn/Star
8	Magnus Konow	Norway	1912–1936	2	1	0	3	12 Metre/8 Metre/6 Metre
8	Mark Reynolds	United States	1988–2000	2	1	0	3	Star
8	Mathew Belcher	Australia	2012–2020	2	1	0	3	470
8	Rodney Pattisson	Great Britain	1968–1976	2	1	0	3	Flying Dutchman
14	Tore Holm	Sweden	1920–1948	2	0	2	4	40m^{2} class/8 Metre/6 Metre
15	Jesper Bank	Denmark	1988–2000	2	0	1	3	Soling
15	Marcelo Ferreira	Brazil	1996–2004	2	0	1	3	Star
16	Algernon Maudslay	Great Britain	1900	2	0	0	2	Open class/.5 to 1 ton
16	Bernd Jäkel	East Germany; Germany	1988-1996	2	0	0	2	Soling
16	Dorian van Rijsselberghe	Netherlands	2012–2016	2	0	0	2	RS:X
16	Erik Hansen	Denmark	1976–1980	2	0	0	2	Soling
16	Frédéric Blanchy	Mixed team France	1900	2	0	0	2	2 to 3 ton
16	John Gretton	Great Britain	1900	2	0	0	2	Open class/.5 to 1 ton
16	Giles Scott	Great Britain	2016–2020	2	0	0	2	Finn
16	Håkon Barfod	Norway	1948-1952	2	0	0	2	Dragon
16	Herman Whiton	United States	1948–1952	2	0	0	2	6 Metre
16	Jacques Le Lavasseur	Mixed team France	1900	2	0	0	2	2 to 3 ton
16	Kahena Kunze	Brazil	2016–2020	2	0	0	2	49er FX
16	Linton Hope	Great Britain	1900	2	0	0	2	Open class/.5 to 1 ton
16	Luis Doreste Blanco	Spain	1984-1992	2	0	0	2	470/Flying Dutchman
16	Malcolm Page	Australia	2008–2012	2	0	0	2	470
16	Martine Grael	Brazil	2016–2020	2	0	0	2	49er FX
16	Nicolas Hénard	France	1988-1992	2	0	0	2	Tornado
16	Poul Richard Høj Jensen	Denmark	1976-1980	2	0	0	2	Soling
16	Roman Hagara	Austria	2000-2004	2	0	0	2	Tornado
16	Sarah Ayton	Great Britain	2004–2008	2	0	0	2	Yngling
16	Sarah Webb	Great Britain	2004–2008	2	0	0	2	Yngling
16	Shirley Robertson	Great Britain	1992–2004	2	0	0	2	Europe/Yngling
16	Sigve Lie	Norway	1948–1952	2	0	0	2	Dragon
16	Theresa Zabell	Spain	1992–1996	2	0	0	2	470
16	Thor Thorvaldsen	Norway	1948–1952	2	0	0	2	Dragon
16	William Exshaw	Mixed team Great Britain	1900	2	0	0	2	2 to 3 ton
16	Valdemar Bandolowski	Denmark	1976–1980	2	0	0	2	Soling
16	Matthew Wearn	Australia	2020–2024	2	0	0	2	ILCA 7 (Laser)
16	Ruggero Tita	Italy	2020–2024	2	0	0	2	Nacra 17
16	Caterina Banti	Italy	2020–2024	2	0	0	2	Nacra 17

== See also ==
- Sailing at the Summer Paralympics
- List of Olympic medalists in sailing
- Olympic sailing classes
