= Ton class =

Type of classification for yachts

Ton classes are categories used to identify classes of yachts.

== Thames tonnage ==
Early attempts at creating rating rules were based on the British "old tonnage measurement" system to calculate the volume of the hold of large commercial ships. It gave the vessel's carrying capacity in tons (at 35 cubic feet per ton) or, as some believe, in tuns. Sail area was not included, of course, nor were any credits given for less efficient rigs so, naturally, in the yacht-racing field the cutters predominated. Eventually, this rule was modified in 1854 as the Thames Measurement Rule:

$$\text{Thames tonnage} = \frac {(\text{length}-\text{beam}) \times \text{beam}^2} {188}$$

where the length is in feet, from the stempost to sternpost; and the beam is the maximum beam, in feet.

== Godinet rule ==
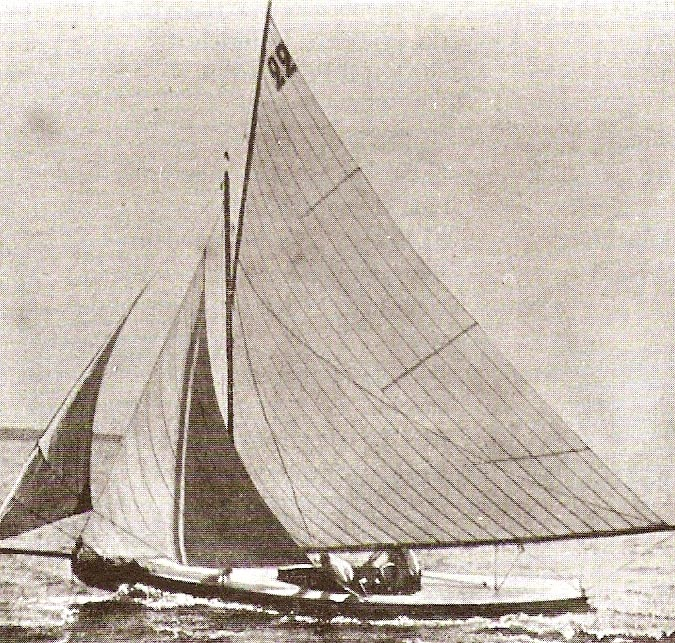
Lérina during a sailing competition

Modification to the rule in 1901

The Godinet rule was adopted in 1892 by the "Union des yachts français", and was quickly adopted by other nations on the European continent. It allowed the classifications of yachts by tons, with a formula established by Auguste Godinet which considers displacement, length, and the total sail area.

$$T=\frac {(L- 0.25P) \cdot P \cdot \sqrt{S}} {130}$$

where:

- L = LWL
- P = girth of the hull
- S = Sail area
- T = Rule in tons

The Société Nautique de Genève, which was an early adopter of the rule, amended it in 1901 to include the skin girth instead of the chain girth.

This new French rule was adopted in December 1892 by Switzerland followed by Germany, Denmark, Finland and Sweden in March 1893. Belgium and Spain completed the list. In March 1894 the Godinet rule is first noted in the United States, at the construction of the Vendenesse, the world's first aluminium yacht.

Some yacht in existence that were designed to the Godinet rule:

- Bona Fide: designed by Charles Sibbick in 1898 to rate as a 5-tonner. It was built at the Albert Yard, Cowes, for J.Howard Taylor, who later won the gold medal in the category 3 to 10 tons at the 1900 Olympics. This yacht was authentically restored between 1999 and 2003 by the Cantiere Navale dell'Argentario, in Tuscany, and is the last 19th-century Godinet rater.
- Calypso: designed and built in 1911 to rate as a 3-tonner

== Olympic Games ==
The Ton classes were Olympic classes in 1900 and probably also in 1896. Due to weather conditions the yacht races in 1896 were cancelled and much information of that event is no longer available. For the 1900 events, sailing categories were established based on the Godinet rule:

- 0.5 Ton
- 0.5–1 Ton
- 1–2 Ton
- 2–3 Ton
- 3–10 Ton
- 10–20 Ton
- Open Class

=== 1900 Olympics France ===
Event	Gold	Silver	Bronze
1900: Open class	Great Britain (GBR); Lorne Currie; John Gretton; Linton Hope; Algernon Maudslay	Germany (GER); Paul Wiesner; Georg Naue; Heinrich Peters; Ottokar Weise	France (FRA); Émile Michelet
1900: 0 to .5 ton Race: 1	France (FRA); Pierre Gervais	France (FRA); François Texier; Auguste Texier; Jean-Baptiste Charcot; Robert Linzeler	France (FRA); Henri Monnot; Léon Tellier; Gaston Cailleux
1900: 0 to .5 ton Race: 2	France (FRA); Émile Sacré	France (FRA); François Texier; Auguste Texier; Jean-Baptiste Charcot; Robert Linzeler	France (FRA); Pierre Gervais
1900: .5 to 1 ton Race: 1	Great Britain (GBR); Lorne Currie; John Gretton; Linton Hope; Algernon Maudslay	France (FRA); Jules Valton; Félix Marcotte; William Martin; Jacques Baudrier; Jean Le Bret	France (FRA); Émile Michelet; Marcel Meran
1900: .5 to 1 ton Race: 2	France (FRA); Louis Auguste-Dormeuil	France (FRA); Émile Michelet; Marcel Meran	France (FRA); Jules Valton; Félix Marcotte; William Martin; Jacques Baudrier; Jean Le Bret
1900: 1 to 2 ton Race: 1	Switzerland (SUI); Hermann de Pourtalès; Hélène de Pourtalès; Bernard de Pourtalès	France (FRA); François Vilamitjana; Auguste Albert; Albert Duval; Charles Hugo	France (FRA); Jacques Baudrier; Lucien Baudrier; Dubosq; Édouard Mantois
1900: 1 to 2 ton Race: 2	Germany (GER); Paul Wiesner; Georg Naue; Heinrich Peters; Ottokar Weise	Switzerland (SUI); Hermann de Pourtalès; Hélène de Pourtalès; Bernard de Pourtalès	France (FRA); François Vilamitjana; Auguste Albert; Albert Duval; Charles Hugo
1900: 2 to 3 ton Race: 1	Mixed team (ZZX); William Exshaw; Frédéric Blanchy; Jacques Le Lavasseur	France (FRA); Léon Susse; Jacques Doucet; Auguste Godinet; Henri Mialaret	France (FRA); Ferdinand Schlatter; Gilbert de Cotignon; Émile Jean-Fontaine
1900: 2 to 3 ton Race: 2	Mixed team (ZZX); William Exshaw; Frédéric Blanchy; Jacques Le Lavasseur	France (FRA); Léon Susse; Jacques Doucet; Auguste Godinet; Henri Mialaret	France (FRA); Auguste Donny
1900: 3 to 10 ton Race: 1	France (FRA); Henri Gilardoni	Netherlands (NED); Henri Smulders; Chris Hooykaas; Arie van der Velden	France (FRA); Maurice Gufflet; A. Dubois; J. Dubois; Robert Gufflet; Charles Guiraist
1900: 3 to 10 ton Race: 2	Great Britain (GBR); Howard Taylor; Edward Hore; Harry Jefferson	France (FRA); Maurice Gufflet; A. Dubois; J. Dubois; Robert Gufflet; Charles Guiraist	United States (USA); H. MacHenry
1900: 10 to 20 ton	France (FRA); Émile Billard; Paul Perquer	France (FRA); Jean, duc Decazes	Great Britain (GBR); Edward Hore
1900: 20+ ton	Great Britain (GBR); Cecil Quentin	Great Britain (GBR); Selwin Calverley	United States (USA); Harry Van Bergen

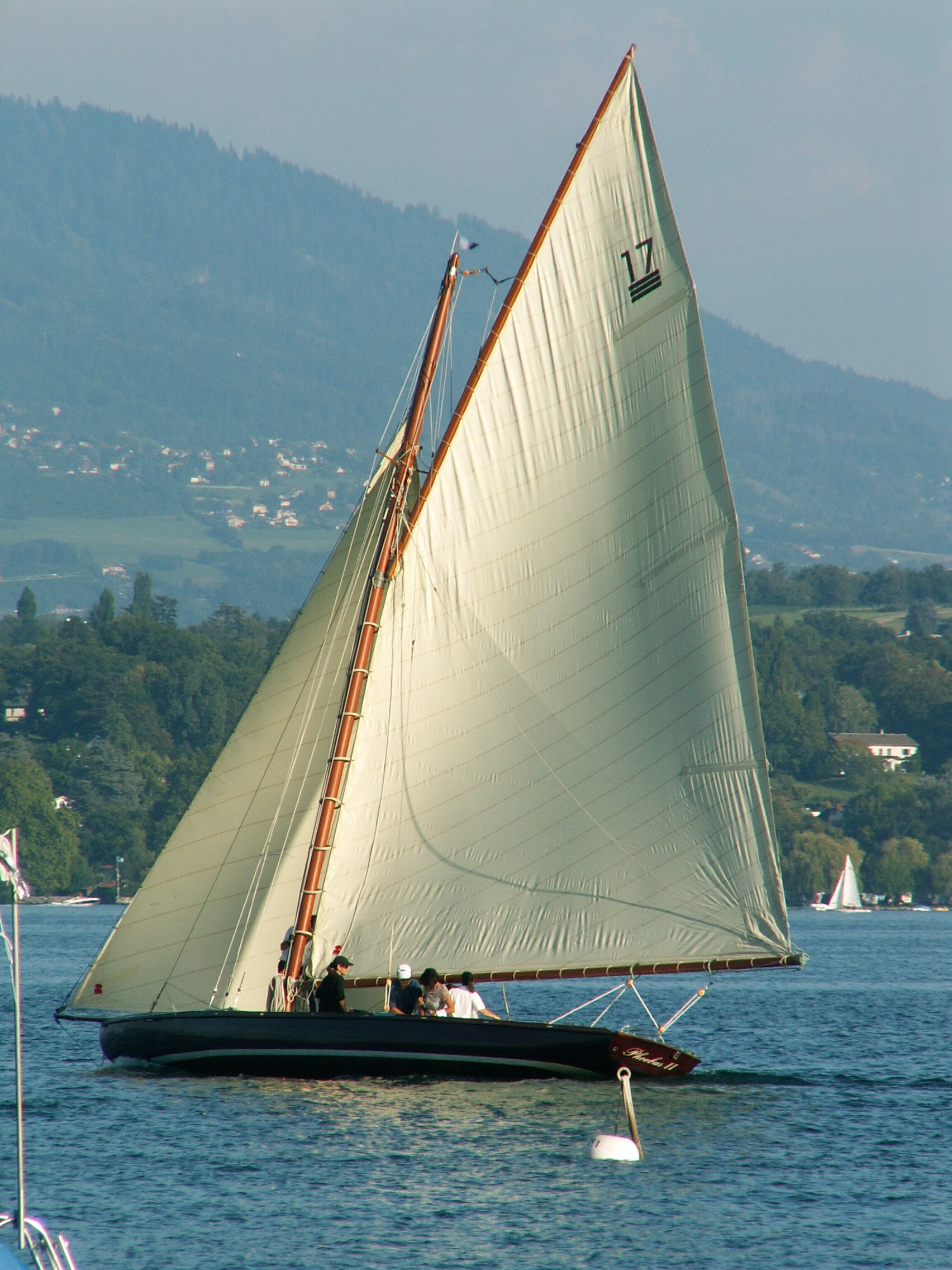
the 3-tonner Phoebus II

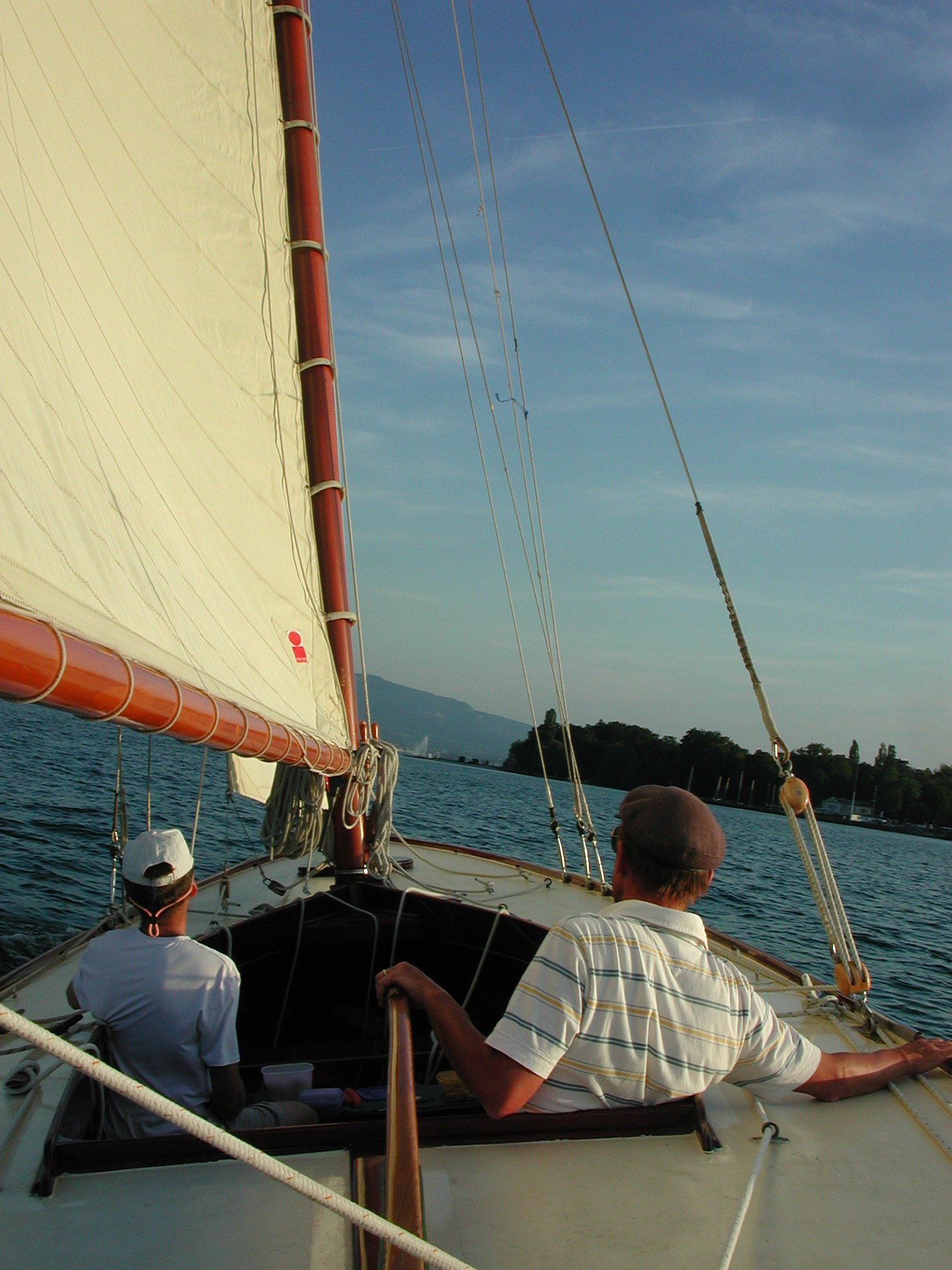
aboard a 3-tonner

== See also ==
- Metre Rule (sailing)
- Square Metre Rule (sailing)
- Universal Rule
