= Meulan-en-Yvelines =

- Commune
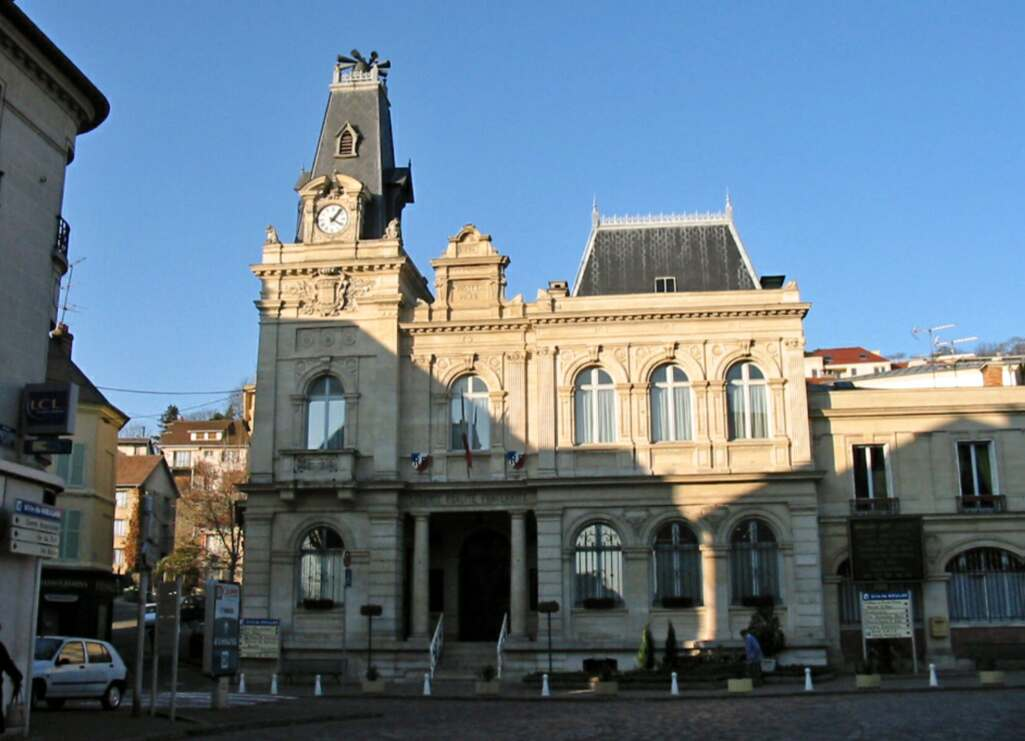
- Town hall (Hôtel de Ville)

- Coat of arms
- Location of Meulan-en-Yvelines
- Location within France Location within Île-de-France (region)
- Coordinates: 49°00′24″N 1°54′26″E
- Country: France
- Region: Île-de-France
- Department: Yvelines
- Arrondissement: Mantes-la-Jolie
- Canton: Les Mureaux
- Intercommunality: CU Grand Paris Seine et Oise

Government
  - Mayor (2020–2026): Cécile Zammit-Popescu
- Area^{1}: 3.46 km^{2} (1.34 sq mi)
- Elevation: 25 m (82 ft)
- Highest elevation: 117 m (384 ft)
- Lowest elevation: 18 m (59 ft)
- Population (2023): 8,950
  - Density: 2,590/km^{2} (6,700/sq mi)
- Demonym: Meulanais
- Time zone: UTC+01:00 (CET)
  - Summer (DST): UTC+02:00 (CEST)
- INSEE/Postal code: 78401 /78250
- Website: ville-meulan.fr
- ^{1} French Land Register data, which excludes lakes, ponds, glaciers > 1 km^{2} (0.386 sq mi or 247 acres) and river estuaries.

Meulan-en-Yvelines (French pronunciation: [mølɑ̃ ɑ̃n‿ivlin]; lit. 'Meulan-in-Yvelines'; before 2010: Meulan) is a commune in the Yvelines department in the Île-de-France region in north-central France.

It is on the right bank of the Seine and hosted part of the sailing events for the 1900 Summer Olympics held in neighbouring Paris, and would do so again 24 years later.

== History ==
In 1435, as a part of the Hundred Years' War, Ambroise de Loré and Jean de Dunois defeated the English nearby.

Meulan hosted the first regatta in the sailing event at the 1900 Summer Olympics.

== Population ==
Historical population
Year	Pop.	±% p.a.
1968	4,580	—
1975	8,486	+9.21%
1982	8,832	+0.57%
1990	8,101	−1.07%
1999	8,394	+0.40%
2007	8,773	+0.55%
2012	8,988	+0.49%
2017	8,990	+0.00%
2023	8,950	−0.07%
Source: INSEE

== Heraldry ==
The coat of arms of Meulan-en-Yvelines is blazoned as:

Azure semy-de-lys or, a chief chequy or and gules of four tiers.

The shield of arms is composed of the ancient arms of France, granted to the village as an augmentation of honour by Henri IV in 1590, with a chief displaying the first four tiers of the chequy or and gules arms of the ancient Counts of Meulan.

== Notable people ==
- Abdoulaye Doucouré (born 1993), footballer
- David Douillet (born 1969), judoka
- Frederic Esther (born 1972), boxer
- Elie Konki (born 1992), boxer
- Ferland Mendy (born 1995), footballer
- Kevin Mendy (born 1992), basketball player
- M'Baye Niang (born 1994), footballer
- Ibrahim Sacko (born 1993), footballer
- Maurice Thiriet (1906–1972), composer
- Yannick Zachee (born 1986), basketball player

== Twin towns – sister cities ==
Meulan is twinned with:

- Arraiolos, Portugal
- Kilsyth, Scotland, United Kingdom
- Taufkirchen, Germany

== See also ==
- Aubette de Meulan
- Communes of the Yvelines department
