= France at the 1900 Summer Olympics =

- IOC code: FRA
- NOC: French Olympic Committee

in Paris, France May 14, 1900 – October 28, 1900
- Competitors: 720 in 19 sports
- Medals Ranked 1st: Gold 31 Silver 41 Bronze 40 Total 112

Summer Olympics appearances (overview)
- 1896; 1900; 1904; 1908; 1912; 1920; 1924; 1928; 1932; 1936; 1948; 1952; 1956; 1960; 1964; 1968; 1972; 1976; 1980; 1984; 1988; 1992; 1996; 2000; 2004; 2008; 2012; 2016; 2020; 2024; 2028

Other related appearances
- 1906 Intercalated Games

France was the host of the 1900 Summer Olympics in Paris. France was one of many nations that had competed in the 1896 Summer Olympics in Greece, which were the first international Olympic Games held in modern history, and had returned to compete at the 1900 Games.

Gold medals were not given out. The winners were given silver medals, while the second-placed competitors were given bronze medals.

== Medalists ==
Medal	Name	Sport	Event
Gold	Gaston Aumoitte	Croquet	singles one ball
Gold	Albert Robert Ayat	Fencing	masters épée
Gold	Albert Robert Ayat	Fencing	amateurs-masters épée
Gold	Roger de Barbarin	Shooting	trap shooting
Gold	Louis Bastien	Cycling	25 kilometres
Gold	Hermann Barrelet	Rowing	single sculls
Gold	Emile Coste	Fencing	foil
Gold	Georges de la Falaise	Fencing	sabre
Gold	Michel Théato (LUX) (Note: In 2024, the IOC reinstated its original and current attribution policy for athletes at the early Olympic Games (1896–1904). From 2021 to 2024, the IOC briefly attributed medals in individual events according to the athlete's nationality, even when the athlete represented a foreign club or team. Since 2024, participation and medals have instead been attributed according to the national affiliation of the club or team represented by the athlete.)	Athletics	marathon
Gold	Dominique Gardères	Equestrian	high jump
Gold	Pierre Gervais	Sailing	0-½ ton race 1
Gold	Louis Auguste-Dormeuil	Sailing	½-1 ton race 2
Gold	Henri Gilardoni	Sailing	3-10 ton race 1
Gold	Emile Grumiaux	Archery	Sur la Perche à la Pyramide
Gold	Henri Hérouin	Archery	Au Cordon Doré 50 metres
Gold	Henri Hérouin	Archery	Championnat du Monde
Gold	Lucien Mérignac	Fencing	masters foil
Gold	Eugène Mougin	Archery	Au Chapelet 50 metres
Gold	Achille Paroche	Shooting	prone military rifle
Gold	Émile Sacré	Sailing	0-½ ton race 2
Gold	Gustave Sandras	Gymnastics	combined exercises
Gold	Georges Taillandier	Cycling	2000 metre sprint
Gold	Charles Devendeville	Swimming	men's underwater swimming
Gold	Chrétien Waydelich	Croquet	singles two balls
Gold	Gaston Aumoitte, Georges Johin	Croquet	doubles
Gold	'Ollé' (Note: At the 1900 Summer Olympics seven team event medals (3 gold, 2 silver, and 2 bronze) won by French clubs competing as mixed teams—composed primarily of French athletes alongside a few non-French participants—were attributed to France: one gold in rugby, two golds in sailing, one silver each iin cricket and tug of war, and one bronze each in polo and water polo.) Frédéric Blanchy; E. William Exshaw (GBR); Jacques Le Lavasseur	Sailing	2–3 ton (race 1)
Gold	'Ollé' Frédéric Blanchy; E. William Exshaw (GBR); Jacques Le Lavasseur	Sailing	2-3 ton (race 2)
Gold	Émile Billard, Paul Perquer	Sailing	10-20 ton
Gold	Cercle de l'Aviron Roubaix	Rowing	coxed fours
Gold	Napoléon Murat	Equestrian	Hacks and hunter combined
Gold	Union des Sociétés Françaises Abel Albert; Jean Collas; Charles Gondouin; Wladimir Aïtoff; Léon Binoche; Jean-Guy Gauthier; Auguste Giroux; Constantin Henriquez (HAI); Jean Hervé; Victor Larchandet; Hubert Lefèbvre; Joseph Olivier; Alexandre Pharamond; Frantz Reichel; André Rischmann; André Roosevelt; Emile Sarrade	Rugby	Men's rugby union
Silver	Noël Bas	Gymnastics	combined exercises
Silver	Émile Bougnol	Fencing	masters épée
Silver	Émile Champion	Athletics	marathon
Silver	Jean Decazes	Sailing	10-20 ton
Silver	Henri Deloge	Athletics	1500 metres
Silver	André Gaudin	Rowing	single sculls
Silver	Henri Helle	Archery	Au Chapelet 50 metres
Silver	Lloyd Hildebrand (GBR)	Cycling	25 kilometres
Silver	Georges Johin	Croquet	singles one ball
Silver	Alphonse Kirchhoffer	Fencing	masters foil
Silver	Henri Masson	Fencing	foil
Silver	Achille Paroche	Shooting	individual military pistol
Silver	Louis Perrée	Fencing	épée
Silver	Hélène Prévost	Tennis	women's singles
Silver	Fernand Sanz	Cycling	2000 metre sprint
Silver	Auguste Serrurier	Archery	Sur la Perche à la Herse
Silver	Auguste Serrurier	Archery	Sur la Perche à la Pyramide
Silver	André Six	Swimming	men's underwater swimming
Silver	Henri Tauzin	Athletics	400 metre hurdles
Silver	Victor Thibaud	Archery	Au Cordon Doré 33 metres
Silver	Victor Thibaud	Archery	Au Chapelet 33 metres
Silver	Léon Thiébaut	Fencing	sabre
Silver	Maurice Vignerot	Croquet	singles two balls
Silver	Henri Deloge; Jacques Chastanié; Paul Castanet; Michel Champoudry; Gaston Ragueneau	Athletics	5000 metre team race
Silver	Louis Duffoy; Maurice Lecoq; Léon Moreaux; Achille Paroche; Jules Trinité	Shooting	team military pistol
Silver	Jean-Baptiste Charcot; Robert Linzeler; François Texier; Auguste Texier	Sailing	0-½ ton race 1
Silver	Jean-Baptiste Charcot; Robert Linzeler; François Texier; Auguste Texier	Sailing	0-½ ton race 2
Silver	Jacques Baudrier; Jean Le Bret; Félix Marcotte; William Martin; Jules Valton	Sailing	½-1 ton race 1
Silver	Marcel Meran; Émile Michelet	Sailing	½-1 ton race 2
Silver	Auguste Albert, Albert Duval; Charles Hugo; François Vilamitjana	Sailing	1-2 ton race 1
Silver	Jacques Doucet; Auguste Godinet; Henri Mialaret; Léon Susse	Sailing	2-3 ton race 1
Silver	Jacques Doucet; Auguste Godinet; Henri Mialaret; Léon Susse	Sailing	2-3 ton race 2
Silver	Alfred Dubois; Jules Dubois; Maurice Gufflet; Robert Gufflet; Charles Guiraist	Sailing	3-10 ton race 2
Silver	Union des Sociétés Françaises; French athletes William Attrill; H. F. Roques; Philip Tomalin British athletes William Anderson; John Braid; W. Browning; Robert Horne; Timothée Jordan; Arthur MacEvoy; Douglas Robinson; A. J. Schneidau; Henry Terry	Cricket	Men's cricket
Silver	Racing Club de France Raymond Basset; Jean Collas; Charles Gondouin; Joseph Roffo; Émile Sarrade; Francisco Henríquez de Zubiría (COL)	Tug of war	Team competition
Silver	Club Française	Football	men's competition
Silver	Club Nautique de Lyon	Rowing	coxed fours
Silver	Société Nautique de la Marne	Rowing	coxed pairs
Silver	Tritons Lillois	Swimming	men's 200 metre team swimming
Silver	Victor Archenoul	Equestrian	Hacks and hunter combined
Silver	Léon Thome	Equestrian	Four-in-Hand Mail Coach
Bronze	Jacques de Prunelé (Camille de La Forgue de Bellegarde)	Equestrian	long jump
Bronze	Marcel Boulenger	Fencing	foil
Bronze	Louis de Champsavin	Equestrian	jumping
Bronze	Jacques Chastanié	Athletics	2500 metre steeplechase
Bronze	Justinien de Clary	Shooting	trap shooting
Bronze	Auguste Daumain	Cycling	25 kilometres
Bronze	Louis Trousselier	Cycling	points race
Bronze	Lucien Démanet	Gymnastics	combined exercises
Bronze	Auguste Donny	Sailing	2-3 ton race 2
Bronze	Pierre Gervais	Sailing	0-½ ton race 2
Bronze	Émile Fisseux	Archery	Au Cordon Doré 50 metres
Bronze	Henri Laurent	Fencing	masters épée
Bronze	Louis Martin	Swimming	men's 4000 metre freestyle
Bronze	Émile Mercier	Archery	Au Chapelet 50 metres
Bronze	Jean-Baptiste Mimiague	Fencing	masters foil
Bronze	Charles Frédéric Petit	Archery	Au Cordon Doré 33 metres
Bronze	Charles Frédéric Petit	Archery	Au Chapelet 33 metres
Bronze	Jacques Sautereau	Croquet	singles two balls
Bronze	Léon Sée	Fencing	épée
Bronze	Léon Sée	Fencing	amateurs-masters épée
Bronze	Emile Torcheboeuf	Athletics	standing long jump
Bronze	Chrétien Waydelich	Croquet	singles one ball
Bronze	Auguste Cavadini; Maurice Lecoq; Léon Moreaux; Achille Paroche; René Thomas	Shooting	team military rifle
Bronze	André Prévost; Georges de la Chapelle	Tennis	men's doubles
Bronze	Henri Monnot; Léon Tellier; Gaston Cailleux	Sailing	0-½ ton race 1
Bronze	Marcel Meran; Émile Michelet; F. Michelet	Sailing	½-1 ton race 1
Bronze	Jacques Baudrier; Jean Le Bret; Félix Marcotte; William Martin; Jules Valton	Sailing	½-1 ton race 2
Bronze	Jacques Baudrier; Lucien Baudrier; Dubosq; Edouard Mantois	Sailing	1-2 ton race 1
Bronze	Auguste Albert; Albert Duval; Charles Hugo; François Vilamitjana	Sailing	1-2 ton race 2
Bronze	Gilbert de Cotignon; Emile Jean-Fontaine; Ferdinand Schlatter	Sailing	2-3 ton race 1
Bronze	Alfred Dubois; Jules Dubois; Maurice Gufflet; Robert Gufflet; Charles Guiraist	Sailing	3-10 ton race 1
Bronze	Émile Michelet, F. Michelet	Sailing	open class
Bronze	Rowing Club Castillon	Rowing	coxed pairs
Bronze	Pupilles de Neptune	Swimming	men's 200 metre team swimming
Bronze	Bagatelle Polo Club de Paris Frederick Agnew Gill (GBR); Robert Fournier-Sarlovèze; Edouard Alphonse de Rothschild; Maurice Raoul-Duval	Polo	Men's tournament
Bronze	Libellule de Paris Bill Burgess (GBR); Jules Clévenot / Devenot; Alphonse Decuyper; Louis Laufray; Henri Peslier; Paul Vasseur; Auguste Pesloy	Water polo	Men's tournament
Bronze	Pupilles de Neptune	Water polo	Men's tournament
Bronze	Robert de Montesquiou	Equestrian	Hacks and hunter combined
Bronze	Jean de Neuflize	Equestrian	Four-in-Hand Mail Coach
Bronze	Abbie Pratt (USA)	Golf	Women's individual

- Note - Recorded as Great Britain and Ireland until 2024, the IOC Executive Board approved the change of Lloyd Hildebrand's silver medal at Paris 1900 Olympics from Great Britain to France.

== Archery ==
France took four of seven gold medals, five of eight silver medals, and four of five bronze medals in the six archery events that were Olympic. Belgium and the Netherlands were the only others nation that competed, taking the remaining seven medals. Many of the French, Belgian, and Dutch competitors are unknown as their names were not recorded. 13 French archers are known by at least their surname, 116 are unidentified in any way. The 129 archers had 240 entries across all 7 archery events.

Athlete	Event	Final	
Athlete	Event	Score	Rank
Charles Frédéric Petit	Au Cordon Doré 33 metres	Unknown	3rd place, bronze medalist(s)
Victor Thibault	Au Cordon Doré 33 metres	Unknown	2nd place, silver medalist(s)
Édouard Beaudoin	Au Cordon Doré 50 metres	26	5
Denet	Au Cordon Doré 50 metres	26	6
Émile Fisseux	Au Cordon Doré 50 metres	28	3rd place, bronze medalist(s)
Galinard	Au Cordon Doré 50 metres	26	7
Henri Helle	Au Cordon Doré 50 metres	27	4
Henri Hérouin	Au Cordon Doré 50 metres	31	1st place, gold medalist(s)
Lecomte	Au Cordon Doré 50 metres	25	8
Charles Frédéric Petit	Au Chapelet 33 metres	Unknown	3rd place, bronze medalist(s)
Victor Thibault	Au Chapelet 33 metres	Unknown	2nd place, silver medalist(s)
Henri Helle	Au Chapelet 50 metres	Unknown	2nd place, silver medalist(s)
Émile Mercier	Au Chapelet 50 metres	Unknown	3rd place, bronze medalist(s)
Eugène Mougin	Au Chapelet 50 metres	Unknown	1st place, gold medalist(s)
Henri Hérouin	Championnat du Monde	22	1st place, gold medalist(s)
Auguste Serrurier	Sur la Perche à la Herse	Unknown	1st place, gold medalist(s)
Émile Grumiaux	Sur la Perche à la Pyramide	Unknown	1st place, gold medalist(s)
Auguste Serrurier	Sur la Perche à la Pyramide	Unknown	2nd place, silver medalist(s)

== Athletics ==
France was one of 9 nations to have competed at both the first two Olympics in athletics. 22 athletes competed in 18 events, with a total of 28 entries. France won its first Olympic championship in the sport, though that victory's belonging to France is disputed. Michel Théato was Luxembourgish but living in Paris; his win in the marathon was initially credited to France by the International Olympic Committee, however currently International Olympic Committee attributes his medal to Luxembourg. Without Théato's gold medal, France won a total of 6 medals in the sport and ranked 3rd in the leaderboard for athletics.

=== Track & road events ===
Athlete	Event	Heat		Repechage		Final	
Athlete	Event	Time	Rank	Time	Rank	Time	Rank
Adolphe Klingelhoefer	60 m	Unknown	4-5	—N/a		Did not advance	
Adolphe Klingelhoefer	200 m	Unknown	3	—N/a		Did not advance	
Georges Clément	400 m	Unknown	4	—N/a		Did not advance	
Charles-Robert Faidide	400 m	Unknown	3	—N/a		Did not advance	
Henri Deloge	800 m	2:00.6	1 Q	—N/a		Unknown	4
Maurice Salomez	800 m	Unknown	4	—N/a		Did not advance	
Henri Deloge	1500 m	—N/a				4:06.6	2nd place, silver medalist(s)
Louis Segondi	1500 m	—N/a				Unknown	7-9
Eugène Choisel	110 m hurdles	DNF R		Unknown	3	Did not advance	
Adolphe Klingelhoefer	110 m hurdles	DNF R		DNS		Did not advance	
Jean Lécuyer	110 m hurdles	WO	1 Q	Bye		Unknown	4
Eugène Choisel	200 m hurdles	27.5	2 Q	—N/a		Unknown	4
Charles Gondouin	200 m hurdles	DNS		—N/a		Did not advance	
Henri Tauzin	200 m hurdles	Unknown	4	—N/a		Did not advance	
Henri Tauzin	400 m hurdles	1:00.2	1 Q	—N/a		58.3	2nd place, silver medalist(s)
Jean Chastanié	2500 m steeplechase	—N/a				Unknown	3rd place, bronze medalist(s)
Jean Chastanié	4000 m steeplechase	—N/a				Unknown	4
Racing Club de France; Henri Deloge; Jean Chastanié; Paul Castanet; Albert Champoudry; Gaston Ragueneau	5000 m team race	—N/a				29	2nd place, silver medalist(s)
Eugène Besse	Marathon	—N/a				4:00:43	4
Émile Champion	Marathon	—N/a				3:04:17	2nd place, silver medalist(s)
Georges Touquet-Daunis	Marathon	—N/a				DNF	
Auguste Marchais	Marathon	—N/a				DNF	
Martens	Marathon	—N/a				DNS	

=== Field events ===
Athlete	Event	Qualification		Final	
Athlete	Event	Distance	Position	Distance	Position
Léon Monnier	High jump	—N/a		1.60	7
Émile Gontier	Pole vault	—N/a		3.10	=4
Albert Delannoy	Long jump	6.755	3 Q	Unknown	5
Albert Delannoy	Triple jump	—N/a		Unknown	5
Alexandre Tuffèri	Triple jump	—N/a		Unknown	6
Émile Torchebœuf	Standing long jump	—N/a		3.03	3rd place, bronze medalist(s)
Émile Torchebœuf	shot put	DNS		Did not advance	
Émile Gontier	Discus throw	30.0	13	Did not advance	
André Roosevelt	Discus throw	DNS		Did not advance	

== Basque pelota ==
France sent one of two teams that competed in the pelota tournament. According to some sources, French two-man team lost to Spain's team, taking the silver medal. However, the French team withdrew shortly before the competition. International Olympic Committee does not recognize silver medal of French team.

Athlete	Event	Final	
Athlete	Event	Opposition Result	Rank
Maurice Durquetty; Etchegaray	Two-Man teams with cesta	Aspizúa / Villota (ESP); L DNS	DNS

== Cricket ==
France was represented by the French Athletic Club Union in cricket in 1900. The team lost the only match, a 2-day 12-man contest, by 158 runs. At least 11 members of the French Athletic Club Union were British nationals, two of whom were born in France; another, H. F. Roques, as well those shown on the scoresheet as "extras", may have been French.

Team	Event	Final	
Team	Event	Opposition Score	Rank
French Athletic Club Union (FRA); William Anderson (GBR); William Attrill (FRA); John Braid (GBR); W. Browning (GBR); Robert Horne (GBR); Timothée Jordan (GBR); Arthur MacEvoy (GBR); Douglas Robinson (GBR); H. F. Roques (FRA); Alfred Schneidau (GBR); Henry Terry (GBR); Philip Tomalin (FRA)	Men's	Devon and Somerset Wanderers (GBR); L by 158 runs	2nd place, silver medalist(s)

== Croquet ==
France was the only nation to compete in croquet. France sent 6 men and 3 women. The French players won all 7 medals in the three events.

=== One ball ===
Athlete	Event	Round 1		Round 2		Final	
Athlete	Event	Points	Rank	Points	Rank	Points	Rank
Gaston Aumoitte	Singles, one ball	18	4 Q	18	4 Q	15	1st place, gold medalist(s)
Al. Blachère	Singles, one ball	17	3 Q	22	4	Did not advance	
Louise Anne Marie Després	Singles, one ball	24	5	Did not advance			
Jeanne Filleul-Brohy	Singles, one ball	DNF		Did not advance			
Marcel Haëntjens	Singles, one ball	DNF		Did not advance			
Georges Johin	Singles, one ball	13	2 Q	16	1 Q	21	2nd place, silver medalist(s)
Marie Ohier	Singles, one ball	DNF		Did not advance			
Jacques Sautereau	Singles, one ball	DNF		Did not advance			
Chrétien Waydelich	Singles, one ball	11	1 Q	20	3	Did not advance	3rd place, bronze medalist(s)

=== Two balls ===
Athlete	Event	Round 1	Final		
Athlete	Event	Opposition Score	MW	ML	Rank
Al. Blachère	Singles, two balls	Sautereau (FRA); L 2–0 (41-19)	0	3	4
Jeanne Filleul-Brohy	Singles, two balls	Waydelich (FRA); L WO	Did not advance		
Louise Anne Marie Després	Singles, two balls	Vignerot (FRA); L 2–0 (42-40)	Did not advance		
Jacques Sautereau	Singles, two balls	Blachère (FRA); W 2–0 (41-19)	1	2	3rd place, bronze medalist(s)
Maurice Vignerot	Singles, two balls	Després (FRA); W 2–0 (42-40)	2	1	2nd place, silver medalist(s)
Chrétien Waydelich	Singles, two balls	Filleul-Brohy (FRA); W WO	3	0	1st place, gold medalist(s)

=== Doubles ===
Athlete	Event	Final	
Athlete	Event	Result	Rank
Gaston Aumoitte; Georges Johin	Doubles	Unknown	1st place, gold medalist(s)

== Cycling ==
France competed a second time in cycling, once again dominating the field. Of the nine medals awarded in the event, French cyclists took six—two of each type. 59 French cyclists competed.

=== Sprint ===
Athlete	Event	Qualification		Quarterfinals	Semifinals	Final	
Athlete	Event	Time	Rank	Opposition Time	Opposition Time	Opposition Time	Rank
Charles Amberger	Men's sprint	Unknown	4-8	Did not advance			
Georges Augoyat	Men's sprint	Unknown	4-7	Did not advance			
Omer Beaugendre	Men's sprint	Unknown	4-8	Did not advance			
J. Bérard	Men's sprint	Unknown	4-8	Did not advance			
Maxime Bertrand	Men's sprint	Unknown	4-8	Did not advance			
G. Bessing	Men's sprint	Unknown	4-7	Did not advance			
Alfred Boulnois	Men's sprint	Unknown	4-8	Did not advance			
Fernand Boulmant	Men's sprint	Unknown	4-8	Did not advance			
L. Boyer	Men's sprint	Unknown	4-8	Did not advance			
Gaston Bullier	Men's sprint	Unknown	3 Q	Sanz (FRA); Rosso (FRA); L	Did not advance		
Caillet	Men's sprint	Unknown	4-5	Did not advance			
Adolphe Cayron	Men's sprint	1:34.2	1 Q	Legrain (FRA); Gottron (GER); L	Did not advance		
Vladislav Chalupa	Men's sprint	Unknown	4-8	Did not advance			
Chaput	Men's sprint	Unknown	3 Q	Lake (USA); Stratta (ITA); L	Did not advance		
Georges Coindre	Men's sprint	Unknown	2 Q	Duill (GER); Germain (FRA); W 1:50.0	Sanz (FRA); Restelli (ITA); L	Did not advance	
Octave Coisy	Men's sprint	Unknown	4-8	Did not advance			
Auguste Daumain	Men's sprint	Unknown	3 Q	Restelli (ITA); Hildebrand (FRA); L	Did not advance		
Will Davis	Men's sprint	Unknown	2 Q	Vasserot (FRA); Dohis (FRA); L	Did not advance		
Marcel Dohis	Men's sprint	Unknown	2 Q	Vasserot (FRA); Davis (FRA); L	Did not advance		
Émile Dubois	Men's sprint	Unknown	4-8	Did not advance			
Dubourdieu	Men's sprint	Unknown	4-8	Did not advance			
L. Dumont	Men's sprint	Unknown	4-8	Did not advance			
Paul Espeit	Men's sprint	Unknown	2 Q	Maisonnave (FRA); Ponscarme (FRA); L	Did not advance		
Franzen	Men's sprint	Unknown	4-8	Did not advance			
Théophile Fras	Men's sprint	Unknown	3 Q	Mallet (FRA); Brusoni (ITA); L	Did not advance		
Germain	Men's sprint	Unknown	3 Q	Coindre (FRA); Duill (GER); L	Did not advance		
Guillot	Men's sprint	Unknown	4-8	Did not advance			
P. Hubault	Men's sprint	DNF		Did not advance			
Paul Legrain	Men's sprint	1:30.4	1 Q	Gottron (GER); Cayron (FRA); W 2:57.4	Taillandier (FRA); Mallet (FRA); L	Did not advance	
Lohner	Men's sprint	Unknown	4-8	Did not advance			
Longchamp	Men's sprint	Unknown	4-8	Did not advance			
Édouard Maibaum	Men's sprint	Unknown	4-6	Did not advance			
Léon Maisonnave	Men's sprint	1:35.8	1 Q	Ponscarme (FRA); Espeit (FRA); W 1:49.2	Lake (USA); Vasserot (FRA); L	Did not advance	
Joseph Mallet	Men's sprint	Unknown	3 Q	Brusoni (ITA); Fras (FRA); W 2:45.0	Taillandier (FRA); Legrain (FRA); L	Did not advance	
Maurice Monniot	Men's sprint	Unknown	4-7	Did not advance			
Mossmann	Men's sprint	Unknown	4-5	Did not advance			
Georges Neurouth	Men's sprint	Unknown	4-8	Did not advance			
Pichard	Men's sprint	Unknown	4-8	Did not advance			
Pilton	Men's sprint	Unknown	4-6	Did not advance			
Léon Ponscarme	Men's sprint	Unknown	2 Q	Maisonnave (FRA); Espeit (FRA); L	Did not advance		
A. Porcher	Men's sprint	DSQ		Did not advance			
Pouget	Men's sprint	Unknown	4-8	Did not advance			
A. Roger	Men's sprint	Unknown	4-8	Did not advance			
Paul Rosso	Men's sprint	Unknown	3 Q	Sanz (FRA); Bullier (FRA); L	Did not advance		
Ruez	Men's sprint	Unknown	4-8	Did not advance			
Saignier	Men's sprint	Unknown	4-8	Did not advance			
Fernand Sanz	Men's sprint	Unknown	2 Q	Bullier (FRA); Rosso (FRA); W 2:00.0	Restelli (ITA); Coindre (FRA); W 2:46.6	Taillandier (FRA); Lake (USA); L	2nd place, silver medalist(s)
L. Saunière	Men's sprint	Unknown	4-8	Did not advance			
M. Steitz	Men's sprint	Unknown	4-8	Did not advance			
Albert Taillandier	Men's sprint	1:36.8	1 Q	Vincent (BEL); Thomann (FRA); W 2:00.6 OR	Legrain (FRA); Mallet (FRA); W 2:42.6	Sanz (FRA); Lake (USA); W 2:52.0	1st place, gold medalist(s)
Maurice Terrier	Men's sprint	Unknown	4-6	Did not advance			
Thomann	Men's sprint	Unknown	3 Q	Taillandier (FRA); Vincent (BEL); L	Did not advance		
Émile Vadbled	Men's sprint	Unknown	4-8	Did not advance			
Ferdinand Vasserot	Men's sprint	Unknown	3 Q	Dohis (FRA); Davis (FRA); W 2:21.6	Lake (USA); Maisonnave (FRA); L	Did not advance	
Édouard Wick	Men's sprint	DNF		Did not advance			

- Note - Recorded as Great Britain and Ireland until 2024, the IOC Executive Board approved the change of Lloyd Hildebrand's silver medal at Paris 1900 Olympics from Great Britain to France.

=== 25 km ===
Athlete	Event	Time	Rank
Louis Bastien	25 km	25:36.2	1st place, gold medalist(s)
Lloyd Hildebrand	25 km	28:09.4	2nd place, silver medalist(s)
Auguste Daumain	25 km	29:36.2	3rd place, bronze medalist(s)
Maxime Bertrand	25 km	Unknown	4
Léon Gingembre	25 km	DNF	
Louis Trousselier	25 km	DNF	
A. Porcher	25 km	DNF	
J. Bérard	25 km	DNF	

=== Points race ===
Athlete	Event	Points	Rank
J. Bérard	Men's points race	5	5
Adolphe Cayron	Men's points race	4	6
Chaput	Men's points race	8	4
Georges Coindre	Men's points race	1	=12
Octave Coisy	Men's points race	4	=7
Marcel Dohis	Men's points race	2	=9
Germain	Men's points race	2	=9
Louis Trousselier	Men's points race	9	3rd place, bronze medalist(s)
Ferdinand Vasserot	Men's points race	4	=7

- Note - Recorded as Great Britain and Ireland until 2024, the IOC Executive Board approved the change of Lloyd Hildebrand's silver medal at Paris 1900 Olympics from Great Britain to France.

== Equestrian ==
=== Jumping ===
Athlete	Horse	Event	Time	Rank
Charles, Count de Béthune-Scully	Tip-Top	Individual	Unknown	4-37
Louis de Champsavin	Terpsichore	Individual	2:26.0	3rd place, bronze medalist(s)
De Coulombier	Unknown	Individual	Unknown	4-37
d'Auzac de la Martinie	Unknown	Individual	Unknown	4-37
Hubert Dutech	Unknown	Individual	Unknown	4-37
Dominique Gardères	Unknown	Individual	Unknown	4-37
Paul Haëntjens	Unknown	Individual	Unknown	4-37
Louis d'Havrincourt	Mavourneen	Individual	Unknown	4-37
Maurice Jéhin	Bistouri	Individual	Unknown	4-37
Henri Leclerc	Extra-Dry	Individual	Unknown	4-37
Henri Leclerc	Gilles	Individual	Unknown	4-37
Napoléon Murat	Arcadius	Individual	Unknown	4-37
Arthur Philippot	Floridor	Individual	Unknown	4-37
Eugène Poidebard	Unknown	Individual	Unknown	4-37
Vigneulles	Unknown	Individual	Unknown	4-37

=== High jump ===
Athlete	Horse	Event	Height	Rank
Hubert Dutech	Unknown	High jump	Unknown	9-19
Dominique Gardères	Canéla	High jump	1.85	1st place, gold medalist(s)
Paul Haëntjens	Nell	High jump	1.70	5-8
Henri Leclerce	Mahomet	High jump	1.70	5-8
Napoléon Murat	Arcadius	High jump	1.70	5-8
Napoléon Murat	Bayard	High jump	Unknown	9-19
Wignolle	Sunrise	High jump	1.70	5-8

=== Long jump ===
Athlete	Horse	Event	Distance	Rank
Napoléon Murat	Bayard	Long jump	5.30	4
Henri Plocque	Camelia	Long jump	Unknown	5
Jacques de Prunelé	Tolla	Long jump	5.30	3rd place, bronze medalist(s)

=== Hacks and hunter combined ===
Athlete	Horse	Event	Place
Pierre Louis Alaret	Unknown	Hacks and hunter combined	5–51
Victor Archenoul	Retournelle	Hacks and hunter combined	2nd place, silver medalist(s)
Charles Baveaux	Unknown	Hacks and hunter combined	5–51
Cordon	Unknown	Hacks and hunter combined	5–51
Louis de Champsavin	Terpsichore	Hacks and hunter combined	5–51
Marquis de Croix	Unknown	Hacks and hunter combined	5–51
Pierre Dillon	Duc d'Aoste	Hacks and hunter combined	5–51
Maurice Foache	Unknown	Hacks and hunter combined	5–51
Louis d'Havrincourt	Unknown	Hacks and hunter combined	5–51
Georges de Lagarenne	Louqsor	Hacks and hunter combined	5–51
Mathieu Marie de Lesseps	Unknown	Hacks and hunter combined	5–51
Robert de Montesquiou	Grey Leg	Hacks and hunter combined	3rd place, bronze medalist(s)
René Alfred Robert de Quincey	Cy Beau	Hacks and hunter combined	5–51
Paul Haëntjens	Mavourneen	Hacks and hunter combined	4
Maurice Jéhin	Biscuit	Hacks and hunter combined	5–51
Blanche de Marcigny	Unknown	Hacks and hunter combined	5–51
Jane Moulin	Unknown	Hacks and hunter combined	5–51
Napoléon Murat	The General	Hacks and hunter combined	1st place, gold medalist(s)
Auguste Roy	Reine de Sabat	Hacks and hunter combined	5–51
Vigneulles	Unknown	Hacks and hunter combined	5–51
Up to 26 other competitors	Unknown	Hacks and hunter combined	5–51

=== Four-in-hand (mail coach) ===
Athlete	Event	Place
Bertrand Chanu	Mail coach	5–31
Louis du Douet de Graville	Mail coach	5–31
Ferdinand de Lariboisière	Mail coach	5–31
Jean de Neuflize	Mail coach	3rd place, bronze medalist(s)
Adrien de Noailles	Mail coach	5–31
Paul de Saint-Léger	Mail coach	5–31
Charles Eugène Amable de Veauce	Mail coach	5–31
Jacques de Waru	Mail coach	5–31
Geoffroy d'Andigné	Mail coach	5–31
Jacques d'Arlincourt	Mail coach	5–31
Octave Gallice	Mail coach	5–31
James Hennessy	Mail coach	5–31
Jacques la Caze	Mail coach	5–31
Jacques la Caze	Mail coach	5–31
Léon Thome	Mail coach	2nd place, silver medalist(s)
Philippe Vernes	Mail coach	4

== Fencing ==
France dominated the fencing competitions at the second modern Olympics, taking five of the seven gold medals and 15 of the 21 overall medals.

Athlete	Event	Round 1			Quarterfinal			Repechage			Semifinal			Final		
Athlete	Event	MW	ML	Rank	MW	ML	Rank	MW	ML	Rank	MW	ML	Rank	MW	ML	Rank
Gaston Achille	Men's épée			3-7	Did not advance			—N/a			Did not advance					
Adam	Men's épée			4-6	Did not advance			—N/a			Did not advance					
Gaston Alibert	Men's épée			1 Q			1 Q	—N/a					1 Q	2	3	7
Andreac	Men's épée			4-6	Did not advance			—N/a			Did not advance					
Louis Bastien	Men's épée			3-6	Did not advance			—N/a			Did not advance					
Bazin	Men's épée			4-6	Did not advance			—N/a			Did not advance					
A. Berger	Men's épée			3-6	Did not advance			—N/a			Did not advance					
Herman Georges Berger	Men's épée			2 Q			4-6	—N/a			Did not advance					
Raoul Bideau	Men's épée			2 Q			4-6	—N/a			Did not advance					
Maurice Boisdon	Men's épée			2 Q			1 Q	—N/a					4-6	Did not advance		
Albert Cahen	Men's épée			3-6	Did not advance			—N/a			Did not advance					
Clément de Boissière	Men's épée			3-6	Did not advance			—N/a			Did not advance					
de Cazenove	Men's épée			3-7	Did not advance			—N/a			Did not advance					
Laurent de Champeaux	Men's épée			3-6	Did not advance			—N/a			Did not advance					
Thion de la Chaume	Men's épée			3-7	Did not advance			—N/a			Did not advance					
Jacques de la Chevalerie	Men's épée			3-6	Did not advance			—N/a			Did not advance					
Costiesco	Men's épée			4-6	Did not advance			—N/a			Did not advance					
Henri Jean Début	Men's épée			2 Q			4-6	—N/a			Did not advance					
Delprat	Men's épée			3-6	Did not advance			—N/a			Did not advance					
Jean Dreyfus	Men's épée			2 Q			1 Q	—N/a					4-6	Did not advance		
Duclos	Men's épée			3-7	Did not advance			—N/a			Did not advance					
Ducreuil	Men's épée			3	Did not advance			—N/a			Did not advance					
Pierre d'Hugues	Men's épée			3-6	Did not advance			—N/a			Did not advance					
Marie Joseph Anatole Elie	Men's épée			3-6	Did not advance			—N/a			Did not advance					
Fernandès	Men's épée			3-6	Did not advance			—N/a			Did not advance					
Fichot	Men's épée			3-7	Did not advance			—N/a			Did not advance					
Maurice Fleury	Men's épée			4-6	Did not advance			—N/a			Did not advance					
Édouard Fouchier	Men's épée			2 Q			4-6	—N/a			Did not advance					
Stan François	Men's épée			3-6	Did not advance			—N/a			Did not advance					
Gardiès	Men's épée			3-6	Did not advance			—N/a			Did not advance					
Grad	Men's épée			3-6	Did not advance			—N/a			Did not advance					
Alexandre Guillemand	Men's épée			1 Q			3 Q	—N/a					4-6	Did not advance		
Adrien Guyon	Men's épée			1 Q			4-6	—N/a			Did not advance					
Hérrison	Men's épée			3-6	Did not advance			—N/a			Did not advance					
Jean-André Hilleret	Men's épée			2 Q			4-6	—N/a			Did not advance					
Jacques Holzschuch	Men's épée			2 Q			1 Q	—N/a					4-6	Did not advance		
Ivan Ivanovitch	Men's épée			3-6	Did not advance			—N/a			Did not advance					
Maurice Jay	Men's épée			2 Q	DNS			—N/a			Did not advance					
Georges de la Falaise	Men's épée			2 Q			3 Q	—N/a					1 Q	3	3	4
de la Tournable	Men's épée			3-6	Did not advance			—N/a			Did not advance					
Henri de Laborde	Men's épée			3-6	Did not advance			—N/a			Did not advance					
Lafontaine	Men's épée			3-6	Did not advance			—N/a			Did not advance					
Lariviére	Men's épée			3	Did not advance			—N/a			Did not advance					
de Lastic	Men's épée			3-6	Did not advance			—N/a			Did not advance					
Élie, Count de Lastours	Men's épée			2 Q			2 Q	—N/a					4-6	Did not advance		
de Laugardière	Men's épée			3-6	Did not advance			—N/a			Did not advance					
Adjutant Lemoine	Men's épée			3-6	Did not advance			—N/a			Did not advance					
Georges Leroy	Men's épée			3-6	Did not advance			—N/a			Did not advance					
Marcel Lévy	Men's épée			1 Q			3 Q	—N/a					4-6	Did not advance		
Charles Loizillon	Men's épée			3-6	Did not advance			—N/a			Did not advance					
Luquetas	Men's épée			3-6	Did not advance			—N/a			Did not advance					
Robert Marc	Men's épée			4-6	Did not advance			—N/a			Did not advance					
Massé	Men's épée			3-6	Did not advance			—N/a			Did not advance					
de Meuse	Men's épée			3-6	Did not advance			—N/a			Did not advance					
Miller	Men's épée			3-6	Did not advance			—N/a			Did not advance					
Alphonse Moquet	Men's épée			2 Q			4-6	—N/a			Did not advance					
Moreil	Men's épée			3-6	Did not advance			—N/a			Did not advance					
Achille Morin	Men's épée			3-6	Did not advance			—N/a			Did not advance					
Mosso	Men's épée			3-6	Did not advance			—N/a			Did not advance					
Peberay	Men's épée			3-6	Did not advance			—N/a			Did not advance					
Louis Perrée	Men's épée			1 Q			2 Q	—N/a					2 Q	4	1	2nd place, silver medalist(s)
Henri Plommet	Men's épée			1 Q			2 Q	—N/a					2 Q	0	6	9
Jules de Pradel	Men's épée			1 Q			3 Q	—N/a					4-6	Did not advance		
de Pradines	Men's épée			3-7	Did not advance			—N/a			Did not advance					
Preurot	Men's épée			3-6	Did not advance			—N/a			Did not advance					
Prosper	Men's épée			3-7	Did not advance			—N/a			Did not advance					
André-Marie Rabel	Men's épée			1 Q	DNS			—N/a			Did not advance					
Georges Redeuil	Men's épée			3-6	Did not advance			—N/a			Did not advance					
Jean-Joseph Renaud	Men's épée			1 Q	DNS			—N/a			Did not advance					
Max Rodrigues	Men's épée			3-6	Did not advance			—N/a			Did not advance					
Joseph Rodrigues	Men's épée			3-6	Did not advance			—N/a			Did not advance					
Jules Roffe	Men's épée			1 Q			4-6	—N/a			Did not advance					
André de Romilly	Men's épée			3-6	Did not advance			—N/a			Did not advance					
Joseph-Marie Rosé	Men's épée			1 Q			3 Q	—N/a					4-6	Did not advance		
Pierre Rosenbaum	Men's épée			3-7	Did not advance			—N/a			Did not advance					
Salvanahac	Men's épée			3-6	Did not advance			—N/a			Did not advance					
Léon Sée	Men's épée			1 Q			2 Q	—N/a					3 Q	3	2	3rd place, bronze medalist(s)
de Segonzac	Men's épée			3-6	Did not advance			—N/a			Did not advance					
Willy Sulzbacher	Men's épée			3	Did not advance			—N/a			Did not advance					
Jean Taillefer	Men's épée			4-6	Did not advance			—N/a			Did not advance					
Léon Thiébaut	Men's épée			2 Q			2 Q	—N/a					1 Q	2	4	8
Adolphe Thomegeux	Men's épée			3-6	Did not advance			—N/a			Did not advance					
Pierre Thomegeux	Men's épée			4-6	Did not advance			—N/a			Did not advance					
André Tintant	Men's épée			3-6	Did not advance			—N/a			Did not advance					
de Vars	Men's épée			3-6	Did not advance			—N/a			Did not advance					
Véve	Men's épée			3-6	Did not advance			—N/a			Did not advance					
Henri Hébrard de Villeneuve	Men's épée			1 Q			4-6	—N/a			Did not advance					
Edmond Wallace	Men's épée			2 Q			1 Q	—N/a					2 Q	2	4	6
Richard Wallace	Men's épée			1 Q			1 Q	—N/a					4-6	Did not advance		
Weber	Men's épée			3-7	Did not advance			—N/a			Did not advance					
Xavier Anchetti	Men's masters épée			3-6	—N/a						Did not advance					
Emmanuel Andrieu	Men's masters épée			3-6	—N/a						Did not advance					
Assé	Men's masters épée			3-6	—N/a						Did not advance					
Aufort	Men's masters épée			1 Q	—N/a								4-6	Did not advance		
Albert Ayat	Men's masters épée			1 Q	—N/a								1 Q			1st place, gold medalist(s)
Félix Ayat	Men's masters épée			2 Q	—N/a								4-6	Did not advance		
Georges-Louis Bézy	Men's masters épée			1 Q	—N/a								3 Q			9
Bormel	Men's masters épée			3-6	—N/a						Did not advance					
Gilbert Bougnol	Men's masters épée			1 Q	—N/a								1 Q			2nd place, silver medalist(s)
Brassart	Men's masters épée			1 Q	—N/a								2 Q			6
Céré	Men's masters épée			3-6	—N/a						Did not advance					
Charles Clappier	Men's masters épée			2 Q	—N/a								4-6	Did not advance		
Charles Cléry	Men's masters épée			3-6	—N/a						Did not advance					
Marie-Louis Damotte	Men's masters épée			1 Q	—N/a								3 Q			5
Debrinay	Men's masters épée			3-6	—N/a						Did not advance					
Deprey	Men's masters épée			3-6	—N/a						Did not advance					
Élie Dufraisse	Men's masters épée			3-6	—N/a						Did not advance					
Constant Dulau	Men's masters épée			3-6	—N/a						Did not advance					
Flahaut	Men's masters épée			3-6	—N/a						Did not advance					
Louis Garnoty	Men's masters épée			3-6	—N/a						Did not advance					
Louis Haller	Men's masters épée			2 Q	—N/a								4-6	Did not advance		
Hippolyte-Jacques Hyvernaud	Men's masters épée			2 Q	—N/a								3 Q			4
Jean Jeanvoix	Men's masters épée			2 Q	—N/a								4-6	Did not advance		
Georges Jourdan	Men's masters épée			1 Q	—N/a								1 Q			8
Jean Lafoucrière	Men's masters épée			3-6	—N/a						Did not advance					
Launay	Men's masters épée			3-6	—N/a						Did not advance					
Henri Laurent	Men's masters épée			2 Q	—N/a								2 Q			3rd place, bronze medalist(s)
Lézard	Men's masters épée			2 Q	—N/a								2 Q			7
Sylvain Lézard	Men's masters épée			2 Q	—N/a								4-6	Did not advance		
Charles Marty	Men's masters épée			3-6	—N/a						Did not advance					
Joseph-Auguste Métais	Men's masters épée			3-6	—N/a						Did not advance					
Jean Michel	Men's masters épée			1 Q	—N/a								4-6	Did not advance		
Alfred Nau	Men's masters épée			3-6	—N/a						Did not advance					
Nègrout	Men's masters épée			3-6	—N/a						Did not advance					
Henri Pantin	Men's masters épée			1 Q	—N/a								4-6	Did not advance		
Roquais	Men's masters épée			3-6	—N/a						Did not advance					
Surzet	Men's masters épée			3-6	—N/a						Did not advance					
Henri Yvon	Men's masters épée			2 Q	—N/a								4-6	Did not advance		
8 others, names unknown	Men's masters épée			3-6	—N/a						Did not advance					
Albert Ayat	Men's amateurs-masters épée	—N/a												7	0	1st place, gold medalist(s)
Gilbert Bougnol	Men's amateurs-masters épée	—N/a												2	5	=5
Georges de la Falaise	Men's amateurs-masters épée	—N/a												3	4	4
Hippolyte-Jacques Hyvernaud	Men's amateurs-masters épée	—N/a												2	5	=5
Henri Laurent	Men's amateurs-masters épée	—N/a												2	5	=5
Louis Perrée	Men's amateurs-masters épée	—N/a												2	5	=5
Léon Sée	Men's amateurs-masters épée	—N/a												4	3	3rd place, bronze medalist(s)
G.Bélot	Men's foil			Q			R			Q	2	5	7C			12
Eugène Bergès	Men's foil			Q			R			Q			8C			10
Georges Bergès	Men's foil				Did not advanced											
Marcel Boulenger	Men's foil			Q			Q	Bye					1Q	4	3	3rd place, bronze medalist(s)
Albert Cahen	Men's foil			Q				Did not advanced								
Calvet	Men's foil			Q				Did not advanced								
Émile Coste	Men's foil			Q			Q	Bye			7	0	1 Q	6	1	1st place, gold medalist(s)
Clément de Boissière	Men's foil			Q			Q	Bye			2	5	6C			9
de Saint-Aignan	Men's foil			Q			R			q	Bye					11
André de Schonen	Men's foil			Q			R				Did not advanced					
Félix Debax	Men's foil			Q			Q	Bye					2	4	3	4
Georges Dillon-Kavanagh	Men's foil			Q			R			Q			4Q	2	5	7
Joseph Ducrot	Men's foil			Q			Q	Bye					7C			13
Pierre d'Hugues	Men's foil			Q			R			Q			3Q	3	4	5
Édouard Fouchier	Men's foil				Did not advanced											
Gardiès	Men's foil				Did not advanced											
Albert Gautier Vignal	Men's foil				Did not advanced											
Grossard	Men's foil				Did not advanced											
Adrien Guyon	Men's foil			Q			Q	Bye					6C			15
Charles Guérin	Men's foil			Q			Q	Bye			3	4	5C			16
Jactel	Men's foil			Q				Did not advanced								
Henri Jobier	Men's foil			Q			R				Did not advanced					
Paul Leroy	Men's foil				Did not advanced											
Robert Marc	Men's foil			Q				Did not advanced								
Martini	Men's foil			Q				Did not advanced								
Henri Masson	Men's foil			Q			Q	Bye			5	2	2Q	5	2	2nd place, silver medalist(s)
Henri Plommet	Men's foil			Q			R				Did not advanced					
Jean-Joseph Renaud	Men's foil			Q			Q	Bye			DNS			Did not advanced		
Joseph Sénat	Men's foil			Q			R			Q	5	2	3Q	3	4	6
Frédéric Soudois	Men's foil			Q	DNS			Did not advanced								
Jean Taillefer	Men's foil			Q			R				Did not advanced					
Léon Thiébaut	Men's foil			Q			R				Did not advanced					
Passerat	Men's foil				Did not advanced											
Pélabon	Men's foil				Did not advanced											
Raphaël Perrissoud	Men's foil			Q				Did not advanced								
Piot	Men's foil				Did not advanced											
H. Valarche	Men's foil			Q				Did not advanced								
Wattelier	Men's foil			Q				Did not advanced								
Xavier Anchetti	Men's masters foil			Q			R				Did not advanced					
Alexandre Bergès	Men's masters foil			Q			R				Did not advanced					
Charles Bersin	Men's masters foil				Did not advanced											
Michel Bettenfeld	Men's masters foil			Q			R	Did not advanced								
Bormel	Men's masters foil			Q			R	Did not advanced								
Jean-Marie Borringes	Men's masters foil			Q			R	Did not advanced								
Émile Bouard	Men's masters foil				Did not advanced											
Marcel Boulenger	Men's masters foil			Q			R			Q	1	6	6C			13
Jean Boulège	Men's masters foil			Q			R	Did not advanced								
J. Brassard	Men's masters foil			Q			R	Did not advanced								
Brau	Men's masters foil			Q			R	Did not advanced								
François Brun-Buisson	Men's masters foil				Did not advanced											
Cannesson	Men's masters foil			Q			R	Did not advanced								
Paul Carrichon	Men's masters foil			Q			R	Did not advanced								
Henri Coquelin	Men's masters foil				Did not advanced											
Louis Coudurier	Men's masters foil				Did not advanced											
Georges Daussy	Men's masters foil				Did not advanced											
François Delibes	Men's masters foil			Q			R	Did not advanced								
Dizier	Men's masters foil			Q			R	Did not advanced								
Michel Filippi	Men's masters foil			Q			R			Q	1	6	6C			16
Joseph Fontaine	Men's masters foil			Q			R	Did not advanced								
Louis Garnoty	Men's masters foil				Did not advanced											
Louis Gauthier	Men's masters foil			Q			R	Did not advanced								
Louis Haller	Men's masters foil			Q			R			Q	2	5	5C			9
Jolliet	Men's masters foil				Did not advanced											
Alphonse Kirchhoffer	Men's masters foil			Q			Q	Bye			6	1	2Q	6	1	2nd place, silver medalist(s)
Ludovic Laborderie	Men's masters foil			Q			R	Did not advanced								
Jules Large	Men's masters foil			Q			R	Did not advanced								
Lucien Largé	Men's masters foil			Q			R	Did not advanced								
Georges Lefèvre	Men's masters foil			Q			R			Q	1	6	6C			12
Adjutant Lemoine	Men's masters foil			Q			R			Q	2	5	5C			11
Charles Marty	Men's masters foil			Q			R	Did not advanced								
Gustave Masselin	Men's masters foil				Did not advanced											
Lucien Mérignac	Men's masters foil			Q			Q	Bye			7	0	1Q	6	1	1st place, gold medalist(s)
Joseph-Auguste Métais	Men's masters foil			Q			R	Did not advanced								
Lucien Millet	Men's masters foil			Q			R			Q	1	6	6C			14
Jean-Baptiste Mimiague	Men's masters foil			Q			R	Bye			6	1	2Q	4	3	3rd place, bronze medalist(s)
Marcel Montuel	Men's masters foil			Q			R	Did not advanced								
Muller	Men's masters foil			Q			R	Did not advanced								
Henri Pantin	Men's masters foil			Q			R	Did not advanced								
Pietory	Men's masters foil				Did not advanced											
Léopold Ramus	Men's masters foil			Q			Q	Bye			4	3	4Q	2	5	6
René Raynaud	Men's masters foil			Q			R	Did not advanced								
Jules Ringnet	Men's masters foil			Q			R	Did not advanced								
Jules Rossignol	Men's masters foil			Q			Q	Bye			5	2	3Q	3	4	5
Adolphe Rouleau	Men's masters foil			Q			Q	Bye			7	0	1Q	3	4	8
Francis Sabourin	Men's masters foil			Q			R	Did not advanced								
Pierre Samiac	Men's masters foil			Q			R	Did not advanced								
Ernest Tassart	Men's masters foil			Q			R	Did not advanced								
Armand Viguier	Men's masters foil			Q			R	Did not advanced								
Wineuwanheim	Men's masters foil				Did not advanced											
Henri Yvon	Men's masters foil			Q			R	Did not advanced								
Maurice Boisdon	Men's sabre			Q	—N/a								5-8	Did not advanced		
Clément de Boissière	Men's sabre			Q	—N/a								3Q	3	4	6
Gaston Dutertre	Men's sabre			Q	—N/a						DNS			Did not advance		
Georges de la Falaise	Men's sabre			Q	—N/a								4Q	6	1	1st place, gold medalist(s)
Pierre d'Hugues	Men's sabre			Q	—N/a								5-8	Did not advance		
Émile Lafourcade-Cortina	Men's sabre				—N/a						Did not advance					
Léon Lécuyer	Men's sabre			Q	—N/a						DNS			Did not advance		
Casimir Semelaignes	Men's sabre				—N/a						Did not advance					
Fernand Semelaignes	Men's sabre				—N/a						Did not advance					
Léon Thiébaut	Men's sabre			Q	—N/a								4Q	5	2	2nd place, silver medalist(s)
Xavier Anchetti	Men's masters sabre			Q	—N/a						4	3	4Q	2	5	6
Xavier Anchetti	Men's masters sabre			Q	—N/a						4	3	4Q	Barrage for 6th place Zakovorot (RU1); W		6
Aufort	Men's masters sabre				—N/a						Did not advance					
Charles Bersin	Men's masters sabre				—N/a						Did not advance					
François Brun-Buisson	Men's masters sabre			Q	—N/a						1	6	6	Did not advance		
Camier	Men's masters sabre			Q	—N/a						2	5	7	Did not advance		
Alexandre Chantelat	Men's masters sabre			Q	—N/a						3	4	5	Did not advance		
Charles Clappier	Men's masters sabre			Q	—N/a						0	7	7	Did not advance		
Henri Coquelin	Men's masters sabre				—N/a						Did not advance					
Dambremat	Men's masters sabre				—N/a						Did not advance					
Vincent Dargein	Men's masters sabre				—N/a						Did not advance					
Henri Delamaide	Men's masters sabre				—N/a						Did not advance					
François Delibes	Men's masters sabre			Q	—N/a						5	2	3Q	3	4	4
François Delibes	Men's masters sabre			Q	—N/a						5	2	3Q	Barrage for 4th place Michaux (RU1); W		4
Flahaut	Men's masters sabre				—N/a						Did not advance					
Marie-Joseph Gabriel	Men's masters sabre				—N/a						Did not advance					
Louis Midelair	Men's masters sabre			Q	—N/a						0	7	8	Did not advance		
Georges Pinault	Men's masters sabre			Q	—N/a						2	5	6	Did not advance		
Schoenfeld	Men's masters sabre				—N/a						Did not advance					

== Football ==
Club Française represented France in the football competition. The club squad lost to Upton Park F.C. but defeated the Université de Bruxelles team to take second place in the three-team competition.

Summary

Key:

- A.E.T – After extra time.
- P – Match decided by penalty-shootout.

Team	Event	Group Stage		
Team	Event	Opposition Score	Opposition Score	Rank
Club Française	Men's tournament	Upton Park F.C. L 4–0	Université de Bruxelles; W 6–2	2nd place, silver medalist(s)

Team roster

No.	Pos.	Player	Date of birth (age)	Caps	Goals	1900 club
	DF	(France) Pierre Allemane	19 January 1882 (aged 18)			(French Football Federation) Club Français
	DF	(France) Louis Bach	4 April 1883 (aged 17)			(French Football Federation) Club Français
	MF	(France) Alfred Bloch				(French Football Federation) Club Français
	FW	(France) Fernand Canelle	2 January 1882 (aged 18)			(French Football Federation) Club Français
	FW	(France) R. Duparc				(French Football Federation) Racing Levallois 92
	FW	(France) Eugène Fraysse (c1)	24 August 1879 (aged 21)			(French Football Federation) Racing club de France
	MF	(France) Virgile Gaillard	28 July 1877 (aged 23)			(French Football Federation) Club Français
	FW	(France) Georges Garnier (c2)				(French Football Federation) Club Français
	FW	(France) René Grandjean				(French Football Federation) Club Français
	GK	(France) Lucien Huteau	26 May 1878 (aged 22)			(French Football Federation) Club Français
	FW	(France) Marcel Lambert				(French Football Federation) Club Français
	MF	(France) Maurice Macaire	22 November 1881 (aged 18)			(French Football Federation) Club Français
	FW	(France) Gaston Peltier				(French Football Federation) Racing Levallois 92

Pos	Team	Pld	W	D	L	GF	GA	GD	Pts
1	(United Kingdom) Upton Park	1	1	0	0	4	0	+4	2
2	(France) Club Français	2	1	0	1	6	6	0	2
3	(Belgium) Université de Bruxelles	1	0	0	1	2	6	−4	0

Match 1

20 September 1900

Club Français (France)	0–4	(United Kingdom) Upton Park FC
	Report	Nicholas (?); Turner 5'; Zealley 7'

Vélodrome de Vincennes, Paris
Attendance: 500
Referee: Maignard (France)

Team details

Club Français	Upton Park

GK	Lucien Huteau
RB	Louis Bach
LB	Pierre Allemane
RH	Virgile Gaillard
CH	Alfred Bloch
LH	Maurice Macaire
OR	Eugène Fraysse (capt.)
IR	René Garnier
CF	Marcel Lambert
IL	René Grandjean
OL	Fernand Canelle

GK	James Jones
RB	Claude Buckenham
LB	William Gosling
RH	Alfred Chalk
CH	T. E. Burridge
LH	William Quash
OR	Richard Turner
IR	F. G. Spackman
CF	John Nicholas
IL	Jack Zealley
OL	Henry Haslam (capt.)

Match 2

23 September 1900

Club Français (France)	6–2	(Belgium) Université de Bruxelles
Peltier 1' (?); Lambert (?) ? (?)	Report	Spanoghe (?) van Heuckelum (?)

Vélodrome de Vincennes, Paris
Attendance: 1,500
Referee: Jack Wood (Great Britain)

Team details

Club Français	Université de Bruxelles

GK	Lucien Huteau
RB	Louis Bach
LB	Pierre Allemane
RH	Virgile Gaillard
CH	Alfred Bloch
LH	Maurice Macaire
OR	René Ressejac-Duparc
IR	René Garnier (capt.)
CF	Gaston Peltier
IL	Marcel Lambert
OL	Fernand Canelle

GK	(United Kingdom) Eric Thornton
RB	(Belgium) Marius Delbecque
LB	(Netherlands) Hendrik van Heuckelum
RH	(Belgium) Lucien Londot
CH	(Belgium) Ernest Moreau de Melen
LH	(Belgium) Raul Kelecom
OR	(Belgium) Eugène "Edmond" Neefs
IR	(Belgium) Camille Van Hoorden
CF	(Belgium) Gustave Pelgrims (capt.)
IL	(Belgium) Alphonse Renier
OL	(Belgium) Hilaire Spanoghe

== Golf ==
France was one of four nations to compete in the first Olympic golf events.

Golfer	Event	Score	Rank
Pierre Deschamps	Men's individual	231	10
Léon Legrand	Men's individual	DNS	
Albert de Luze	Men's individual	DNS	
Henri, Baron Foy	Men's individual	DNS	
J. van de Wynckélé	Men's individual	252	12
A. Brun	Women's individual	80	10
Baronne Lucile de Fain	Women's individual	65	7
Marie, Princess du Lucinge	Women's individual	DNS	
Froment-Meurice	Women's individual	56	4
Madeleine Fournier-Starvolèze	Women's individual	58	6
Rose Gelbert	Women's individual	76	9

== Gymnastics ==
France's first Olympic gymnastics medals came in the second edition of the competitions. France took all three medals in the single combined event. 108 of the 135 entrants in the event were French.

Athlete	Event	Score	Rank
Allègré	Men's artistic individual all-around	257	26
Aubert	Men's artistic individual all-around	211	88
Balossier	Men's artistic individual all-around	246	40
Albert Barodet	Men's artistic individual all-around	201	105
Noël Bas	Men's artistic individual all-around	295	2nd place, silver medalist(s)
Bayer	Men's artistic individual all-around	145	132
Jean Berhouzouq	Men's artistic individual all-around	268	14
Bernillon	Men's artistic individual all-around	164	126
Bettremieux	Men's artistic individual all-around	249	32
Blanchard	Men's artistic individual all-around	230	65
Bollet	Men's artistic individual all-around	267	15
Bornes	Men's artistic individual all-around	243	47
Bouchon	Men's artistic individual all-around	244	46
Boulanger	Men's artistic individual all-around	232	62
Elie Bourgois	Men's artistic individual all-around	245	43
Bourgougnoux	Men's artistic individual all-around	220	75
Bourry	Men's artistic individual all-around	210	93
Buchert	Men's artistic individual all-around	195	109
Joseph Castiglioni	Men's artistic individual all-around	267	15
Auguste Castille	Men's artistic individual all-around	248	35
Chapau	Men's artistic individual all-around	208	98
Coone	Men's artistic individual all-around	205	101
Coucou	Men's artistic individual all-around	177	121
Cousin	Men's artistic individual all-around	175	122
Ernest Créteur	Men's artistic individual all-around	243	47
Henri Créteur	Men's artistic individual all-around	220	75
Debailly	Men's artistic individual all-around	214	84
Charles Deckert	Men's artistic individual all-around	184	116
Joseph Decroze	Men's artistic individual all-around	214	84
Georges Dejaeghère	Men's artistic individual all-around	272	11
Dejean	Men's artistic individual all-around	221	74
Delaleau	Men's artistic individual all-around	164	126
Julese Deleval	Men's artistic individual all-around	229	67
Lucien Démanet	Men's artistic individual all-around	293	3rd place, bronze medalist(s)
Denis	Men's artistic individual all-around	204	102
Deroubaix	Men's artistic individual all-around	231	64
Douchet	Men's artistic individual all-around	216	79
Georges Dubois	Men's artistic individual all-around	225	70
Dufeite	Men's artistic individual all-around	211	88
Gustave Fahy	Men's artistic individual all-around	283	6
Favier	Men's artistic individual all-around	190	113
Fernhbach	Men's artistic individual all-around	236	56
Fierens	Men's artistic individual all-around	228	69
Fouché	Men's artistic individual all-around	190	113
Gaché	Men's artistic individual all-around	270	12
Gaucher	Men's artistic individual all-around	266	17
Germai	Men's artistic individual all-around	183	117
Félix Ghysels	Men's artistic individual all-around	261	23
Paul Gibiard	Men's artistic individual all-around	247	37
Gillet	Men's artistic individual all-around	211	88
Grimm	Men's artistic individual all-around	233	60
Honorez	Men's artistic individual all-around	245	43
Imbert	Men's artistic individual all-around	246	40
Jacquemin	Men's artistic individual all-around	180	118
Jardinier	Men's artistic individual all-around	241	50
Daniel Kehr	Men's artistic individual all-around	178	120
Koubi	Men's artistic individual all-around	210	93
Labonal	Men's artistic individual all-around	241	50
Labouret	Men's artistic individual all-around	211	88
Lacombe	Men's artistic individual all-around	195	109
Marcel Lalue	Men's artistic individual all-around	275	8
Daniel Lavielle	Men's artistic individual all-around	263	21
Joseph Lavielle	Men's artistic individual all-around	270	12
Jean-Marie le Bourvelec	Men's artistic individual all-around	230	65
Jules Lecoutre	Men's artistic individual all-around	247	37
Lemaire	Men's artistic individual all-around	251	30
Lemoine	Men's artistic individual all-around	187	115
Leroux	Men's artistic individual all-around	175	122
L. Lestienne	Men's artistic individual all-around	273	10
Lévy	Men's artistic individual all-around	232	62
Joseph Martinez	Men's artistic individual all-around	277	7
Georges Mauvezain	Men's artistic individual all-around	275	8
Otto Meyer	Men's artistic individual all-around	219	77
Michaud	Men's artistic individual all-around	242	49
Minot	Men's artistic individual all-around	206	100
Monteil	Men's artistic individual all-around	262	22
Moreno	Men's artistic individual all-around	265	18
Obrech	Men's artistic individual all-around	264	19
Ollivier	Men's artistic individual all-around	209	97
Parisot	Men's artistic individual all-around	164	126
Pierre Payssé	Men's artistic individual all-around	290	4
Pelat	Men's artistic individual all-around	210	93
Jules Perret	Men's artistic individual all-around	248	35
Jules Pinaud	Men's artistic individual all-around	204	102
Pradairol	Men's artistic individual all-around	216	79
Pratviel	Men's artistic individual all-around	246	40
Prilleux	Men's artistic individual all-around	149	131
Dominique Ravoux	Men's artistic individual all-around	249	32
Fernand Ravoux	Men's artistic individual all-around	256	27
Samuel Roche	Men's artistic individual all-around	164	126
Jules Rolland	Men's artistic individual all-around	290	4
Rostin	Men's artistic individual all-around	214	84
Salzard	Men's artistic individual all-around	229	67
Gustave Sandras	Men's artistic individual all-around	302	1st place, gold medalist(s)
Schaan	Men's artistic individual all-around	261	23
Émile Scherb	Men's artistic individual all-around	236	56
Sidrac	Men's artistic individual all-around	200	106
Simon	Men's artistic individual all-around	233	60
Sourzat	Men's artistic individual all-around	196	108
Strasser	Men's artistic individual all-around	236	56
Terrier	Men's artistic individual all-around	133	133
Thiriet	Men's artistic individual all-around	241	50
Touche	Men's artistic individual all-around	154	130
Van Hule	Men's artistic individual all-around	194	111
Vandenhaute	Men's artistic individual all-around	166	125
Vedeux	Men's artistic individual all-around	247	37
Viart	Men's artistic individual all-around	216	79
Viéville	Men's artistic individual all-around	210	93

== Polo ==
France was one of four nations to compete in the first Olympic polo event. Frenchmen played on two of the five teams, one of which also included British players. The mixed French/British Mixed team was one of the third-place teams.

Team	Event	Quarterfinals	Semifinals	Final	
Team	Event	Opposition Score	Opposition Score	Opposition Score	Rank
Bagatelle Polo Club de Paris (FRA); Robert Fournier-Sarlovèze (FRA); Frederick Agnew Gill (GBR); Maurice Raoul-Duval (FRA); Édouard Alphonse James de Rothschild (FRA)	Men's	Bye	Foxhunters Hurlingham (GBR); L 6-4	Did not advance	3rd place, bronze medalist(s)
BLO Polo Club Rugby (GBR); Walter Buckmaster (GBR); Frederick Freake (GBR); Walter McCreery (USA); Jean de Madre (FRA)	Men's	Bye	A north american team (ZZX); W 8-0	Foxhunters Hurlingham (GBR); L 3-1	2nd place, silver medalist(s)
Compiègne Polo Club; Armand de La Rochefoucauld, duc de Bisaccia; Jean Boussod; André Fauquet-Lemaître; Maurice Raoul-Duval	Men's	Foxhunters Hurlingham (GBR); L 10-0	Did not advanced		5

== Rowing ==
47 French rowers competed in the first Olympic rowing competitions in 1900. France won 2 of the 5 gold medals, and a French boy served as cox in the final for the otherwise Dutch team that won the coxed pair. France also won 3 silver medals and 1 bronze.

Athlete	Event	Heat		Semifinal		Final	
Athlete	Event	Time	Rank	Time	Rank	Time	Rank
Hermann Barrelet	Men's single sculls	6:38.8	1 Q	8:23.0	1 Q	7:35.6	1st place, gold medalist(s)
Raymond-Benoît	Men's single sculls	Unknown	4	Did not advance			
Édouard Dammann	Men's single sculls	7:13.0	3	Did not advance			
Charles Delaporte	Men's single sculls	6:33.8	1 Q	9:25.2	3	Did not advance	
Robert d'Heilly	Men's single sculls	6:38.8	2 Q	8:45.0	2 Q	8:16.0	4
Pierre Ferlin	Men's single sculls	6:46.8	2 Q	Unknown	4	Did not advance	
André Gaudin	Men's single sculls	6:43.0	2 Q	8:33.4	2 Q	7:41.6	2nd place, silver medalist(s)
Lardon	Men's single sculls	6:46.4	3	Did not advance			
Maxime Piaggip	Men's single sculls	Did not finish		Did not advance			
Louis Prével	Men's single sculls	6:29.6	1 Q	8:36.4	1 Q	Did not finish	
Club Nautique de Dieppe; Henri Delabarre; Robert Gelée unknown cox	Men's coxed pair	7:04.0	4	—N/a		Did not advance	
Rowing Club Castillon; Carlos Deltour; Antoine Védrenne; Raoul Paoli	Men's coxed pair	6:33.4	1 Q	—N/a		7:57.2	3rd place, bronze medalist(s)
Rowing Club Castillon; Pierre Ferlin; Mathieu unknown cox	Men's coxed pair	7:00.0	2 Q	—N/a		8:01.0	4
Stade Français; Gordon Love; Louis Roche unknown cox	Men's coxed pair	Did not finish		—N/a		Did not advance	
Société Nautique de la Marne; Lucien Martinet; René Waleff unknown cox	Men's coxed pair	6:47.4	1 Q	—N/a		7:34.4	2nd place, silver medalist(s)
Club Nautique de Dieppe; Angot; Henri Delabarre; Robert Gelée; Maison unknown cox	Men's coxed four	6:20.0	4	—N/a		Did not advance	
Club Nautique de France; René Beslaud; Léon Deslinières; Peyronnie; Saurel unknown cox	Men's coxed four	6:40.0	4	—N/a		Did not advance	
Cercle de l'Aviron Roubaix; Henri Bouckaert; Jean Cau; Émile Delchambre; Henri Hazebrouck; Charlot	Men's coxed four	5:59.0	2 QA	—N/a		7:11.0	1st place, gold medalist(s)
Société Nautique de la Marne; Paul Cocuet; Jules Demaré; Clément Dorlia; René Waleff unknown cox	Men's coxed four	Did not finish		—N/a		Did not advance	
Club Nautique de Lyon; Georges Lumpp; Charles Perrin; Daniel Soubeyran; Émile Wegelin unknown cox	Men's coxed four	6:06.2	2 QA	—N/a		7:18.0	2nd place, silver medalist(s)
Société Nautique de la Marne; Maurice Carton; Chantriaux; Paul Cocuet; Jules Demaré; Clément Dorlia; Guilbert; Lucien Martinet; René Waleff unknown cox	Men's eight	Did not finish		—N/a		Did not advance	

== Rugby ==
French team Union des Sociétés Français de Sports Athletiques was one of three teams to compete in the first Olympic rugby games. They won both of its games, taking top prize in the tournament. This gold medal is attributed to Mixed team because of Constantin Henriquez was from Haiti and Andre Roosevelt was a French-born citizen of USA.

Summary

Team	Event	Group Stage		
Team	Event	Opposition Score	Opposition Score	Rank
Union des Sociétés Françaises de Sports Athlétiques	Men's tournament	SC 1880 Frankfurt (GER); W 27–17	Moseley Wanderers (GBR); W 27–8	1st place, gold medalist(s)

Team roster

No.	Pos.	Player	Date of birth (age)	Union
	FW	(France) Vladimir Aïtoff	August 5, 1879 (aged 21)	Racing Club de France
	FW	(France) A. Albert		(France) Cosmopolitan Club
	FW	(France) Jean-Guy Gautier	December 30, 1875 (aged 24)	(France) Stade Français
	FW	(France) Jean Hervé		(France) Stade Français
	FW	(France) Victor Larchandet	December 29, 1863 (aged 36)	(France) U.A.I., Paris
	FW	(France) Hubert Lefèbvre	November 29, 1878 (aged 21)	Racing Club de France
	FW	(France) Joseph Olivier	December 2, 1874 (aged 25)	(France) Stade Français
	FW	(France) Frantz Reichel	March 16, 1871 (aged 29)	Racing Club de France
	FW	(United States) (France) André Roosevelt	April 24, 1879 (aged 21)	Racing Club de France
	FW	(France) Émile Sarrade	March 10, 1877 (aged 23)	Racing Club de France
	FW	(France) Léon Binoche	August 16, 1878 (aged 22)	Racing Club de France
	FW	(France) Charles Gondouin	July 21, 1875 (aged 25)	Racing Club de France
	BK	(France) Alexandre Pharamond	October 20, 1876 (aged 23)	Racing Club de France
	BK	(France) Jean Collas	July 3, 1874 (aged 26)	Racing Club de France
	BK	(France) Auguste Giroux	July 29, 1874 (aged 26)	(France) Stade Français
	BK	(Haiti) (France) Constantin Henriquez		(France) Stade Français
	BK	(France) André Rischmann	January 26, 1882 (aged 18)	(France) Cosmopolitan Club

Match 1

14 Oct

France	27–17	Germany
	Report	Try: E Ludwig, Reitz, Schmierer; Con: Schmierer (2); Drop: Schmierer

Vélodrome de Vincennes, Paris
Attendance: 3,500
Referee: FC Potter-Irwin (England)

Team details

France	Germany

Alexandre Pharamond	15	Hermann Kreuzer
Frantz Reichel	14	Arnold Landvoigt
Jean Collas	13	Heinrich Reitz
Constantin Henriquez	12	Jacob Hermann
Andre Rischmann	11	Erich Ludwig
A. Albert	10	Hugo Betting
Leon Binoche	9	August Schmierer
Jean Herve	8	Albert Amrhein (c)
Victor Lardanchet	7	Richard Ludwig
Jean-Guy Gautier	6	Eduard Poppe
Joseph Olivier (c)	5	Georg Wenderoth
Wladimir Aitoff	4	Willy Hofmeister
Emile Sarrade	3	Hans Latscha
Hubert Lefebvre	2	Adolf Stockhausen
Andre Roosevelt	1	Fritz Muller

Match 2

28 Oct

France	27–8	(United Kingdom) Great Britain
	Report

Vélodrome de Vincennes, Paris
Attendance: 6,000
Referee: M.T.B. Potter

== Sailing ==
France matched Great Britain in gold medals won in the inaugural sailing events in 1900, but took 16 of the 20 silver and bronze medals (8 each). 76 French sailors took part.

Single race events

Athlete	Event	Time	Rank
Auguste Albert; Albert Duval; Charles Hugo; François Vilamitjana	Open class	DNF	
Louis Auguste-Dormeuil	Open class	DSQ	
Jacques Baudrier; Jean Le Bret; Félix Marcotte; William Martin; Jules Valton	Open class	DNF	
Frédéric Blanchy (FRA); William Exshaw (GBR); Jacques Le Lavasseur (FRA)	Open class	DNF	
Gaston Cailleux; Henri Monnot; Léon Tellier	Open class	DNF	
Jean-Baptiste Charcot; Robert Linzeler; François Texier; Auguste Texier	Open class	DNF	
Jacques Baudrier; Lucien Baudrier; Édouard Mantois; Dubosq	Open class	DNF	
Paul Couture	Open class	DNF	
Paul de Boulogne; Eugène Laverne; Faustin Jouët-Pastré; Georges Pottier	Open class	DNF	
Jean de Chabannes la Palice	Open class	DNF	
Jean de Constant	Open class	Unknown	5
Gilbert de Cotignon; Émile Jean-Fontaine; Ferdinand Schlatter	Open class	DNF	
Édouard Mézan de Malartic	Open class	DNF	
Maxime Desonches	Open class	DNF	
Auguste Donny	Open class	DNF	
Jacques Doucet; Auguste Godinet; Henri Mialaret; Léon Susse	Open class	DNF	
Alfred Dubois; Jules Dubois; Charles Guiraist; Maurice Gufflet; Robert Gufflet	Open class	DNF	
Dupland; Letot	Open class	DNF	
Pierre Gervais	Open class	DNF	
Henri Gilardoni	Open class	DNF	
Albert Glandaz	Open class	DNF	
Eugène Laverne; Henri Laverne	Open class	DNF	
Jean Le Bret	Open class	DNF	
Lecointre	Open class	DNF	
L. Legru	Open class	DNF	
Leroy	Open class	DNF	
Henry Maingot	Open class	DNF	
Marcel Meran; Émile Michelet	Open class	DNF	
Émile Michelet	Open class	6:12:12	2nd place, silver medalist(s)
Marcel Moisand	Open class	DNF	
Maurice Monnot	Open class	DNF	
Pierre Moussette	Open class	DNF	
G. Pigeard	Open class	DNF	
Roosevelt	Open class	DNF	
Phocion Rossollin	Open class	DNF	
Émile Sacré	Open class	7:04:08	4
François Texier; Auguste Texier	Open class	DNF	
Georges Warenhorst	Open class	DNF	
Gaston Cailleux; Henri Monnot; Léon Tellier	0 to .5 ton Race 1	1:19:31	3rd place, bronze medalist(s)
Jean-Baptiste Charcot; Robert Linzeler; François Texier; Auguste Texier	0 to .5 ton Race 1	1:08:54	2nd place, silver medalist(s)
Jean de Constant	0 to .5 ton Race 1	1:21:37	5
Pierre Gervais	0 to .5 ton Race 1	1:06:16	1st place, gold medalist(s)
Maurice Monnot	0 to .5 ton Race 1	1:21:01	4
Émile Sacré	0 to .5 ton Race 1	DNF	
Georges Sémichon	0 to .5 ton Race 1	1:23:20	6
Gaston Cailleux; Henri Monnot; Léon Tellier	0 to .5 ton Race 2	2:07:52	4
Jean-Baptiste Charcot; Robert Linzeler; François Texier; Auguste Texier	0 to .5 ton Race 2	1:40:42	2nd place, silver medalist(s)
Jean de Constant	0 to .5 ton Race 2	DNF	
Pierre Gervais	0 to .5 ton Race 2	1:48:44	3rd place, bronze medalist(s)
Maurice Monnot	0 to .5 ton Race 2	2:08:04	5
Émile Sacré	0 to .5 ton Race 2	1:35:59	1st place, gold medalist(s)
Georges Sémichon	0 to .5 ton Race 2	2:34:09	6
Jacques Baudrier; Jean Le Bret; Félix Marcotte; William Martin; Jules Valton	.5 to 1 ton Race 1	3:39:23	2nd place, silver medalist(s)
Paul de Boulogne; Eugène Laverne; Faustin Jouët-Pastré; Georges Pottier	.5 to 1 ton Race 1	DSQ	
Jean de Chabannes la Palice	.5 to 1 ton Race 1	3:47:11	4
Jean de Constant	.5 to 1 ton Race 1	3:52:44	5
Louis Auguste-Dormeuil	.5 to 1 ton Race 1	3:56:55	7
Henri Gauthier	.5 to 1 ton Race 1	4:10:00	14
Albert Glandaz	.5 to 1 ton Race 1	4:08:00	13
Dupland; Letot	.5 to 1 ton Race 1	4:03:58	10
Marc Jousset	.5 to 1 ton Race 1	4:03:00	9
Jean Le Bret	.5 to 1 ton Race 1	4:06:40	12
L. Legru	.5 to 1 ton Race 1	3:53:50	6
Marcel Meran; Émile Michelet	.5 to 1 ton Race 1	3:42:40	3rd place, bronze medalist(s)
Phocion Rossollin	.5 to 1 ton Race 1	4:04:21	11
François Texier; Auguste Texier	.5 to 1 ton Race 1	4:00:32	8
Jacques Baudrier; Jean Le Bret; Félix Marcotte; William Martin; Jules Valton	.5 to 1 ton Race 2	3:41:24	3rd place, bronze medalist(s)
Paul de Boulogne; Eugène Laverne; Faustin Jouët-Pastré; Georges Pottier	.5 to 1 ton Race 2	DNF	
Jean de Chabannes la Palice	.5 to 1 ton Race 2	3:50:45	5
Jean de Constant	.5 to 1 ton Race 2	DNF	
Paul Couture	.5 to 1 ton Race 2	4:19:52	10
Maxime Desonches	.5 to 1 ton Race 2	DNF	
Louis Auguste-Dormeuil	.5 to 1 ton Race 2	3:27:07	1st place, gold medalist(s)
Dupland; Letot	.5 to 1 ton Race 2	4:17:23	9
Albert Glandaz	.5 to 1 ton Race 2	DNF	
Jean Le Bret	.5 to 1 ton Race 2	DNF	
L. Legru	.5 to 1 ton Race 2	3:59:27	7
Édouard Mézan de Malartic	.5 to 1 ton Race 2	DNF	
Marcel Meran; Émile Michelet	.5 to 1 ton Race 2	3:30:31	2nd place, silver medalist(s)
G. Pigeard	.5 to 1 ton Race 2	4:30:08	11
Roosevelt	.5 to 1 ton Race 2	DNF	
Phocion Rossollin	.5 to 1 ton Race 2	4:08:10	8
François Texier; Auguste Texier	.5 to 1 ton Race 2	3:52:52	6
Auguste Albert; Albert Duval; Charles Hugo; François Vilamitjana	1 to 2 ton Race 1	2:17:29	2nd place, silver medalist(s)
Jacques Baudrier; Lucien Baudrier; Édouard Mantois; Dubosq	1 to 2 ton Race 1	2:26:28	3rd place, bronze medalist(s)
Eugène Laverne; Henri Laverne	1 to 2 ton Race 1	2:26:56	4
Lecointre	1 to 2 ton Race 1	3:05:06	8
Marcel Moisand	1 to 2 ton Race 1	2:31:14	5
François Texier; Auguste Texier	1 to 2 ton Race 1	2:52:30	7
Georges Warenhorst	1 to 2 ton Race 1	2:33:54	6
Auguste Albert; Albert Duval; Charles Hugo; François Vilamitjana	1 to 2 ton Race 2	3:37:49	3rd place, bronze medalist(s)
Jacques Baudrier; Lucien Baudrier; Édouard Mantois; Dubosq	1 to 2 ton Race 2	4:10:17	4
Eugène Laverne; Henri Laverne	1 to 2 ton Race 2	DNF	
Lecointre	1 to 2 ton Race 2	DNF	
Marcel Moisand	1 to 2 ton Race 2	4:48:07	7
François Texier; Auguste Texier	1 to 2 ton Race 2	4:30:08	6
Georges Warenhorst	1 to 2 ton Race 2	4:11:22	5

Sailors	Event	Time	Rank
Frédéric Blanchy; Jacques Le Lavasseur; E. William Exshaw (GBR)	2-3 ton class race 1	2:17:30	1st place, gold medalist(s)
Gilbert de Cotignon; Emile Jean-Fontaine; Ferdinand Schlatter	2-3 ton class race 1	2:24:48	3rd place, bronze medalist(s)
Auguste Donny	2-3 ton class race 1	2:26:31	4
Jacques Doucet; Auguste Godinet; Henri Mialaret; Léon Susse	2-3 ton class race 1	2:20:03	2nd place, silver medalist(s)
Frédéric Blanchy; Jacques Le Lavasseur; E. William Exshaw (GBR)	2-3 ton class race 2	4:17:34	1st place, gold medalist(s)
Jacques Doucet; Auguste Godinet; Henri Mialaret; Léon Susse	2-3 ton class race 2	4:23:57	2nd place, silver medalist(s)
Auguste Donny	2-3 ton class race 2	4:52:13	3rd place, bronze medalist(s)
Gilbert de Cotignon; Emile Jean-Fontaine; Ferdinand Schlatter	2-3 ton class race 2	DNF	–
Alfred Dubois; Jules Dubois; Maurice Gufflet; Robert Gufflet; Charles Guiraist	3-10 ton class race 1	3:52.02	3rd place, bronze medalist(s)
Henri Gilardoni	3-10 ton class race 1	3:45.02	1st place, gold medalist(s)
Leroy	3-10 ton class race 1	4:01.35	5
William Martin	3-10 ton class race 1	4:18.18	6
Émile Michelet	3-10 ton class race 1	3:55.16	4
Henry Maingot	3-10 ton class race 1	Unknown	8
François Texier; Auguste Texier	3-10 ton class race 1	Unknown	9
Alfred Dubois; Jules Dubois; Maurice Gufflet; Robert Gufflet; Charles Guiraist	3-10 ton class race 2	4:35:44	2nd place, silver medalist(s)
Leroy	3-10 ton class race 2	5:08:51	5
William Martin	3-10 ton class race 2	5:30:07	7
Émile Michelet	3-10 ton class race 2	DQ	–
Pierre Mousette	3-10 ton class race 2	5:16:50	6
Olivier, Baron de Brandois	20+ ton class	6:20:58	4
Auguste Albert; Albert Duval; Charles Hugo; François Vilamitjana	Open class	DNF	–
Louis Auguste-Dormeuil	Open class	DQ	–
Jacques Baudrier; Félix Marcotte; William Martin; Jules Valton	Open class	DNF	–
Frédéric Blanchy; Jacques Le Lavasseur; E. William Exshaw (GBR)	Open class	DNF	–
Gaston Cailleux; Henri Monnot; Léon Tellier	Open class	DNF	–
Jean-Baptiste Charcot; Robert Linzeler	Open class	DNF	–
Paul Couture	Open class	DNF	–
Paul de Boulogne; Faustin Jouët-Pastré; Pottier	Open class	DNF	–
Jean de Chabannes la Palice	Open class	DNF	–
Jean de Constant	Open class	Unknown	5
Gilbert de Cotignon; Emile Jean-Fontaine; Ferdinand Schlatter	Open class	DNF	–
de Malartic	Open class	DNF	–
Maxime Desonches	Open class	DNF	–
Auguste Donny	Open class	DNF	–
Jacques Doucet; Auguste Godinet; Henri Mialaret; Léon Susse	Open class	DNF	–
Alfred Dubois; Jules Dubois; Maurice Gufflet; Robert Gufflet; Charly Guiraist	Open class	DNF	–
Dupland; Letot	Open class	DNF	–
Pierre Gervais	Open class	DNF	–
Gilardonifra	Open class	DNF	–
Albert Glandaz	Open class	DNF	–
Eugène Laverne; Henri Laverne	Open class	DNF	–
Jean Le Bret	Open class	DNF	–
Lecointre	Open class	DNF	–
Legru	Open class	DNF	–
Leroy	Open class	DNF	–
Henry Maingot	Open class	DNF	–
Marcel Meran	Open class	DNF	–
Émile Michelet; F. Michelet	Open class	6:12:12	3rd place, bronze medalist(s)
Marcel Moisand	Open class	DNF	–
Maurice Monnot	Open class	DNF	–
Pierre Mousette	Open class	DNF	–
G. Pigeard	Open class	DNF	–
Rosevelt	Open class	DNF	–
Phocion Rossollin	Open class	DNF	–
Émile Sacré	Open class	7:04:08	4
François Texier; Auguste Texier	Open class	DQ	–
Georges Warenhorst	Open class	DNF	–

Regatta events

Athlete	Event	Race			Net points	Final rank
Athlete	Event	1	2	3	Net points	Final rank
Émile Billard; Paul Perquer	10 to 20 ton	10	9	10	29	1st place, gold medalist(s)
Jean, duc Decazes	10 to 20 ton	9	8	8	25	2nd place, silver medalist(s)
Georges Cronier	10 to 20 ton	4	7	9	20	4
Jules Valton; Rousselet	10 to 20 ton	7	5	6	18	6

== Shooting ==
France competed again in shooting at the second modern Olympic Games. France won the most medals in the sport that year with 10, but took only three gold medals to Switzerland's five. Men's 20 metre rapid fire pistol event was open to professionals and was contested for prize money by professionals, that is why it is not recognized by the International Olympic Committee as Olympic medal event.

Shooter	Event	Score	Rank
Eugène Balmé	Men's 20 metre rapid fire pistol (Olympic non-medal event)	57	3rd place, bronze medalist(s)
Joseph Labbé	Men's 20 metre rapid fire pistol (Olympic non-medal event)	57	6
Maurice Larrouy	Men's 20 metre rapid fire pistol (Olympic non-medal event)	58	1st place, gold medalist(s)
Paul Moreau	Men's 20 metre rapid fire pistol (Olympic non-medal event)	57	4
Léon Moreaux	Men's 20 metre rapid fire pistol (Olympic non-medal event)	57	2nd place, silver medalist(s)
Louis Duffoy	Men's 50 metre free pistol	442	5
Léon Moreaux	Men's 50 metre free pistol	435	7
Maurice Lecoq	Men's 50 metre free pistol	429	11
Achille Paroche	Men's 50 metre free pistol	466	2nd place, silver medalist(s)
Jules Trinité	Men's 50 metre free pistol	431	10
Louis Duffoy; Maurice Lecoq; Léon Moreaux; Achille Paroche; Jules Trinité	Men's 50 metre free pistol, team	2203	2nd place, silver medalist(s)
Auguste Cavadini	Men's 300 metre free rifle, standing	278	10
Maurice Lecoq	Men's 300 metre free rifle, standing	268	19
Léon Moreaux	Men's 300 metre free rifle, standing	269	17
Achille Paroche	Men's 300 metre free rifle, standing	265	19
René Thomas	Men's 300 metre free rifle, standing	254	24
Auguste Cavadini	Men's 300 metre free rifle, kneeling	286	17
Maurice Lecoq	Men's 300 metre free rifle, kneeling	271	22
Léon Moreaux	Men's 300 metre free rifle, kneeling	269	17
Achille Paroche	Men's 300 metre free rifle, kneeling	287	16
René Thomas	Men's 300 metre free rifle, kneeling	259	27
Auguste Cavadini	Men's 300 metre free rifle, prone	316	7
Maurice Lecoq	Men's 300 metre free rifle, prone	284	25
Léon Moreaux	Men's 300 metre free rifle, prone	325	4
Achille Paroche	Men's 300 metre free rifle, prone	332	1st place, gold medalist(s)
René Thomas	Men's 300 metre free rifle, prone	295	19
Auguste Cavadini	Men's 300 metre free rifle, three positions	880	11
Maurice Lecoq	Men's 300 metre free rifle, three positions	823	21
Léon Moreaux	Men's 300 metre free rifle, three positions	880	11
Achille Paroche	Men's 300 metre free rifle, three positions	887	7
René Thomas	Men's 300 metre free rifle, three positions	808	26
Auguste Cavadini; Maurice Lecoq; Léon Moreaux; Achille Paroche; René Thomas	Men's 300 metre free rifle, team	4278	3rd place, bronze medalist(s)
Ador	Men's trap	Unknown	20
Anjou	Men's trap	Unknown	31
Amédée Aubry	Men's trap	11	13
Maurice Bucquet	Men's trap	Unknown	15
G. Brosselin	Men's trap	Unknown	27
Jules Charpentier	Men's trap	12	7
A. Darnis	Men's trap	Unknown	28
Roger de Barbarin	Men's trap	17	1st place, gold medalist(s)
César de Bettex	Men's trap	16	4
Justinien de Clary	Men's trap	17	3rd place, bronze medalist(s)
de Joubert	Men's trap	12	7
de Montholon	Men's trap	Unknown	23
de Saint-James	Men's trap	Unknown	24
Edouard Geynet	Men's trap	13	6
N. Guyot	Men's trap	Unknown	29
René Guyot (BEL)	Men's trap	17	2nd place, silver medalist(s)
Hilaret	Men's trap	15	5
Joseph Labbé	Men's trap	12	7
Gaston Legrand	Men's trap	Unknown	19
André Mercier	Men's trap	Unknown	21
Léon Moreaux	Men's trap	Unknown	16
Jacques Nivière	Men's trap	Unknown	18
Roger Nivière	Men's trap	Unknown	22
Pierre Perrier	Men's trap	Unknown	26
Pourchainaux	Men's trap	Unknown	30
Reverdin	Men's trap	Unknown	17
Sion	Men's trap	12	7
Soucaret	Men's trap	Unknown	25

== Swimming ==
France had 47 swimmers compete in 1900, the nation's first appearance in the sport. France took a total of 5 medals in the sport, but only 1 gold (putting France in 4th on the leaderboard, after Great Britain, Australia, and Germany who each had 2 championships). Charles Devendeville and André Six finished first and second in the underwater swimming competition, held only in 1900; they appear to have benefitted from the third-place finisher swimming in a circle. France had 3 of the 4 teams in the team swimming event, taking 2nd, 3rd, and 4th.

Swimmer	Event	Semifinals		Final	
Swimmer	Event	Result	Rank	Result	Rank
Adam	Men's 200 metre freestyle	4:28.0	5	Did not advance	
Victor Cadet	Men's 200 metre freestyle	3:24.0	4	Did not advance	
Jules Clévenot	Men's 200 metre freestyle	3:05.0	1 Q	2:56.2	7
Féret	Men's 200 metre freestyle	3:12.2	3	Did not advance	
Maurice Hochepied	Men's 200 metre freestyle	2:48.0	4 q	2:53.0	5
Victor Hochepied	Men's 200 metre freestyle	3:46.6	3	Did not advance	
Jacques Léauté	Men's 200 metre freestyle	4:39.4	5	Did not advance	
Louis Martin	Men's 200 metre freestyle	2:47.4	3 q	Unknown	9
Pierre Peyrusson	Men's 200 metre freestyle	3:47.6	5	Did not advance	
Pujol	Men's 200 metre freestyle	DNF	–	Did not advance	
Ronaux	Men's 200 metre freestyle	4:36.4	6	Did not advance	
René Tartara	Men's 200 metre freestyle	3:13.0	2	Did not advance	
Texier	Men's 200 metre freestyle	3:47.0	4	Did not advance	
Fumouze	Men's 1000 metre freestyle	18:00.0	4	Did not advance	
Maurice Hochepied	Men's 1000 metre freestyle	17:13.2	2 q	16:53.4	7
Lapostolet	Men's 1000 metre freestyle	25:52.0	3	Did not advance	
Georges Leuillieux	Men's 1000 metre freestyle	17:09.6	3 q	16:53.2	6
Lué	Men's 1000 metre freestyle	24:15.0	2	Did not advance	
Louis Martin	Men's 1000 metre freestyle	16:58.0	3 q	16:30.4	5
Désiré Mérchez	Men's 1000 metre freestyle	18:17.2	4	Did not advance	
Souchu	Men's 1000 metre freestyle	DNF	–	Did not advance	
Texier	Men's 1000 metre freestyle	21:33.0	4	Did not advance	
Jules Verbecke	Men's 1000 metre freestyle	17:18.0	1 Q	17:13.8	8
L. Baudoin	Men's 4000 metre freestyle	DNF	–	Did not advance	
Jules Clévenot	Men's 4000 metre freestyle	DNF	–	Did not advance	
de Romand	Men's 4000 metre freestyle	1:50:36.4	6	Did not advance	
Fumouze	Men's 4000 metre freestyle	2:02:27.0	7	Did not advance	
Gallais	Men's 4000 metre freestyle	DNF	–	Did not advance	
Gellé	Men's 4000 metre freestyle	DNF	–	Did not advance	
Heyberger	Men's 4000 metre freestyle	DNF	–	Did not advance	
Kobierski	Men's 4000 metre freestyle	1:37:10.4	5	Did not advance	
Lagarde	Men's 4000 metre freestyle	1:38:31.8	5	Did not advance	
Landrich	Men's 4000 metre freestyle	DNF	–	Did not advance	
Louis Laufray	Men's 4000 metre freestyle	1:35:03.2	3	Did not advance	
Georges Leuillieux	Men's 4000 metre freestyle	DNF	–	Did not advance	
Loppé	Men's 4000 metre freestyle	DNF	–	Did not advance	
Lué	Men's 4000 metre freestyle	1:46:40.4	6	Did not advance	
E. Martin	Men's 4000 metre freestyle	1:28:32.6	2 q	1:26:32.2	7
Louis Martin	Men's 4000 metre freestyle	1:22:29.6	3 q	1:13:08.4	3rd place, bronze medalist(s)
Mortier	Men's 4000 metre freestyle	1:40:16.8	4	Did not advance	
Regnault	Men's 4000 metre freestyle	DNF	–	Did not advance	
Texier	Men's 4000 metre freestyle	1:31:02.8	4	Did not advance	
Vallée	Men's 4000 metre freestyle	DNF	–	Did not advance	
Chevrand	Men's 200 metre backstroke	4:42.0	3	Did not advance	
de Romand	Men's 200 metre backstroke	3:56.6	2 q	3:38.0	6
Fumouze	Men's 200 metre backstroke	5:17.0	6	Did not advance	
Lapostolet	Men's 200 metre backstroke	4:34.6	5	Did not advance	
Georges Leuillieux	Men's 200 metre backstroke	3:10.2	3 q	DNF	–
Lué	Men's 200 metre backstroke	4:10.0	5	Did not advance	
Pierre Peyrusson	Men's 200 metre backstroke	4:15.6	6	Did not advance	
Texier	Men's 200 metre backstroke	4:49.0	7	Did not advance	
Maurice Hochepied	Men's 200 metre obstacle event	3:16.2	2 Q	2:58.0	7
Jules Verbecke	Men's 200 metre obstacle event	3:18.0	3 q	3:08.4	8
Bertrand	Men's 200 metre obstacle event	3:28.2	3 q	3:17.0	9
Louis Marc	Men's 200 metre obstacle event	3:29.2	4 q	3:30.6	10
Victor Hochepied	Men's 200 metre obstacle event	3:37.2	4	Did not advance	
Chevrand	Men's underwater swimming	—N/a		372.0	12
de Romand	Men's underwater swimming	—N/a		145.2	4
Charles de Vendeville	Men's underwater swimming	—N/a		188.4	1st place, gold medalist(s)
Eucher	Men's underwater swimming	—N/a		66.0	14
Kaisermann	Men's underwater swimming	—N/a		88.8	10
Leclerq	Men's underwater swimming	—N/a		88.0	11
Louis Marc	Men's underwater swimming	—N/a		100.0	8
Menault	Men's underwater swimming	—N/a		103.4	7
Pierre Peyrusson	Men's underwater swimming	—N/a		91.6	9
André Six	Men's underwater swimming	—N/a		185.4	2nd place, silver medalist(s)
Tisserand	Men's underwater swimming	—N/a		109.5	5
Libellule de Paris (FRA-GBR): Jules Clévenot; Rosier; Féret; Gasaigne; Pelloy	Men's 200 metre team swimming	—N/a		65	4
Pupilles de Neptune de Lille: Houben; Georges Leuillieux; Louis Martin; Désiré Mérchez; René Tartara	Men's 200 metre team swimming	—N/a		62	3rd place, bronze medalist(s)
Tritons Lillois: Bertrand; M. Cadet; Maurice Hochepied; Victor Hochepied; Jules Verbecke	Men's 200 metre team swimming	—N/a		51	2nd place, silver medalist(s)

== Tennis ==
France competed in tennis for the second time in 1900, sending 14 players—10 men and 4 women. French players appeared in 3 of the 4 finals (Hélène Prévost in the women's singles, and as part of mixed teams with Great Britain in both the men's and mixed doubles) but lost each time. France took an additional bronze medal in the men's doubles.

Player	Event	Round of 16	Quarterfinals	Semifinals	Final	Rank
Player	Event	Opposition Score	Opposition Score	Opposition Score	Opposition Score	Rank
Étienne Durand	Men's singles	R. Doherty (GBR); L 6–1, 6-3	Did not advance			8
Paul Lebreton	Men's singles	L. Doherty (GBR); L 6–2, 6-3	Did not advance			8
Paul Lecaron	Men's singles	Lippmann (FRA); W 6–0, 6-1	R. Doherty (GBR); L 6–2, 6-1	Did not advance		5
Albert Lippmann	Men's singles	Lecaron (FRA); L 6–0, 6-1	Did not advance			8
André Prévost	Men's singles	Norris (GBR); L 6–4, 6-4	Did not advance			8
Marguerite Fourrier	Women's singles	—N/a	Cooper (GBR); L 6–2, 6-0	Did not advance		5
Hélène Prévost	Women's singles	—N/a	Jones (USA); W 6–0, 6-1	Rosenbaumová (BOH); W 6–1, 6-1	Cooper (GBR); L 6–1, 6-4	2nd place, silver medalist(s)
Georges de la Chapelle; André Prévost	Men's doubles	—N/a	de Lastours/Lejeune (FRA); W 6–3, 7–9, 6-2	Décugis (FRA)/ de Garmendia (USA); L 6–2, 6-4	Did not advance	3rd place, bronze medalist(s)
Élie, Count de Lastours; Guy Lejeune	Men's doubles	—N/a	de la Chapelle/Prévost (FRA); L 6–3, 7–9, 6-2	Did not advance		5
Max Décugis; Basil Spalding de Garmendia (USA)	Men's doubles	—N/a	Sands (USA)/ Warden (GBR); W 6–3, 7-5	de la Chapelle/Prévost (FRA); W 6–2, 6-4	L. Doherty/R. Doherty (GBR); L 6–1, 6–1, 6-0	2nd place, silver medalist(s)
Étienne Durand; Adrien Fauchier-Magnan	Men's doubles	—N/a	Mahony/Norris (GBR); L 6–8, 6–1, 6-3	Did not advance		5
Paul Lebreton; Paul Lecaron	Men's doubles	—N/a	L. Doherty/R. Doherty (GBR); L 6–2, 6-3	Did not advance		5
Hélène Prévost; Harold Mahony (GBR)	Mixed doubles	—N/a	Bye	Rosenbaumová (BOH)/ Warden (GBR); W 6–3, 6-0	Cooper/R. Doherty (GBR); L 6–2, 6-4	2nd place, silver medalist(s)
Pierre Verdé-Delisle; Antoinette Gillou	Mixed doubles	—N/a	Rosenbaumová (BOH)/ Warden (GBR); L 6–3, 3–6, 6-2	Did not advance		5

== Tug of war ==
France sent a team to compete in the tug of war competition in 1900, losing to a combined Denmark-Sweden team. This silver medal is attributed to Mixed team, because of Francisco Henríquez de Zubiría was born in Colombia and was a Colombian citizen.

Athletes	Event	Final	Rank
Athletes	Event	Opposition Result	Rank
Roger Basset; Jean Collas; Charles Gondouin; Joseph Roffo; Émile Sarrade; Francisco Henríquez de Zubiría (COL)	Tug of war	Denmark and Sweden; L 2-0	2nd place, silver medalist(s)

== Water polo ==
France had 4 of the 7 teams in the first Olympic water polo tournament. Two were defeated in the quarterfinals, with only one winning a match there and the other advancing with a bye. Both of the remaining teams were defeated in the semifinals, taking bronze medals. The bronze medal of Libellule de Paris team is attributed to Mixed team, because of Bill Burgess was from Great Britain. France thus received 1 bronze medals despite going 1–4 combined.

Team	Roster	Event	Quarterfinals	Semifinals	Final	Rank
Team	Roster	Event	Opposition Result	Opposition Result	Opposition Result	Rank
Libellule de Paris (FRA-GBR)	Bill Burgess (GBR); Jules Clévenot; Alphonse Decuyper; Louis Laufray; Henri Peslier; Pesloy; Paul Vasseur	Men's water polo	Bye	Brussels Swimming and Water Polo Club (BEL); L 5–1	Did not advance	3rd place, bronze medalist(s)
Pupilles de Neptune de Lille #1	Favier; Philippe Houben; Leriche; Jean Leuillieux; Ernest Martin; Tartara; Charles Treffel	Men's water polo	Brussels Swimming and Water Polo Club (BEL); L 2–0	Did not advance		5
Pupilles de Neptune de Lille #2	Eugène Coulon; Fardelle; Favier; Leriche; Louis Martin; Désiré Mérchez; Charles Treffel	Men's water polo	Berliner Swimming Club (GER); W 3–2	Osborne Swimming Club (GBR); L 10–1	Did not advance	3rd place, bronze medalist(s)
Tritons Lillois	Bertrand; Victor Cadet; Maurice Hochepied; Leclerq; Tisserand; Charles Devendeville; Jules Verbecke	Men's water polo	Osborne Swimming Club (GBR); L 12–0	Did not advance		5
