= Archery at the 1900 Summer Olympics – Au Cordon Doré 50 metres =

Archery at the Olympics

50 metre Au Cordon Doré at the Games of the II Olympiad
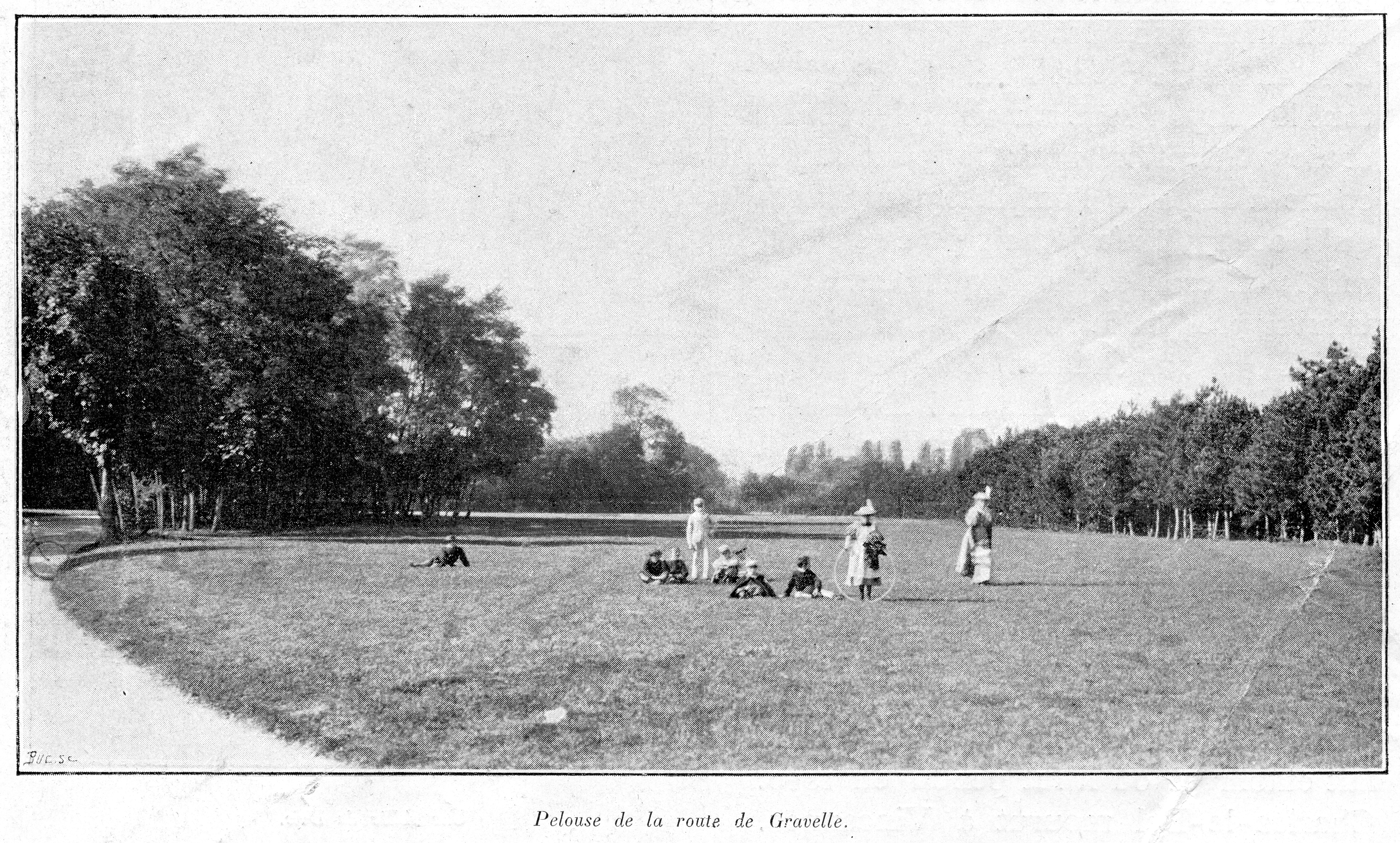
- Contemporary photograph of the Bois de Vincennes, where the event took place
- Venue: Bois de Vincennes
- Date: 14 August
- Competitors: 8 from 2 nations

Medalists
1st place, gold medalist(s)		Henri Hérouin	France
2nd place, silver medalist(s)		Hubert Van Innis	Belgium
3rd place, bronze medalist(s)		Émile Fisseux	France

The Au Cordon Doré at 50 metres event was part of the archery programme at the 1900 Summer Olympics. Qualification for the event was through the large open team events, with the top eight individual archers competing in the individual competition. This was the only one of the four preliminary au berceau archery events in 1900 in which all competitors are named (with scores).

== Background ==
This was the only appearance of the men's Au Cordon Doré at 50 metres. A 33 metres version was also held in 1900.

== Competition format ==
Little is known about the format of the competition.

== Schedule ==
Date	Time	Round
Tuesday, 14 August 1900		Final

== Results ==
Rank	Archer	Nation	Score
1st place, gold medalist(s)	Henri Hérouin	France	31
2nd place, silver medalist(s)	Hubert Van Innis	Belgium	29
3rd place, bronze medalist(s)	Émile Fisseux	France	28
4	Henri Helle	France	27
5	Edouard Beaudoin	France	26
6	Denet	France	26
7	Galinard	France	26
8	Lecomte	France	25
