= Sailing at the 1900 Summer Olympics – 0 to .5 ton =

0 to 0.5 ton sailing at the Games of the II Olympiad
- 0 - 0.5 ton class
- Venue: Meulan
- Date: First race: May 22, 1900; Second race: May 24, 1900
- Competitors: 12 (documented) from 1 nation
- Teams: 7

Medalists
1st place, gold medalist(s)		Pierre Gervais	France
1st place, gold medalist(s)		Émile Sacré	France
2nd place, silver medalist(s)		François Texier, Auguste Texier, Robert Linzeler, Jean-Baptiste Charcot	France
2nd place, silver medalist(s)		François Texier, Auguste Texier, Robert Linzeler, Jean-Baptiste Charcot	France
3rd place, bronze medalist(s)		Henri Monnot, Léon Tellier, Gaston Cailleux	France
3rd place, bronze medalist(s)		Pierre Gervais	France

The 0 to 0.5 ton was a sailing event on the Sailing at the 1900 Summer Olympics program in Meulan. Seven boats started during the two races in the 0 – 0.5 ton. Twelve competitors from France are documented. The races were held on 22 and 24 May 1900 on the river Seine.

== Race schedule ==
●	Meulan competition	●	Le Havre competition

1900	May								August					
1900	20 Sun	21 Mon	22 Tue	23 Wed	24 Thu	25 Fri	26 Sat	27 Thu	1 Fri	2 Sat	3 Sun	4 Mon	5 Tue	6 Wed
0 to 0.5 ton			●		●									
Total gold medals			1		1									

== Course area and course configuration ==
For the 0 to 0.5 ton the 8 kilometres (4.3 nmi) course in the Meulan course area was used.

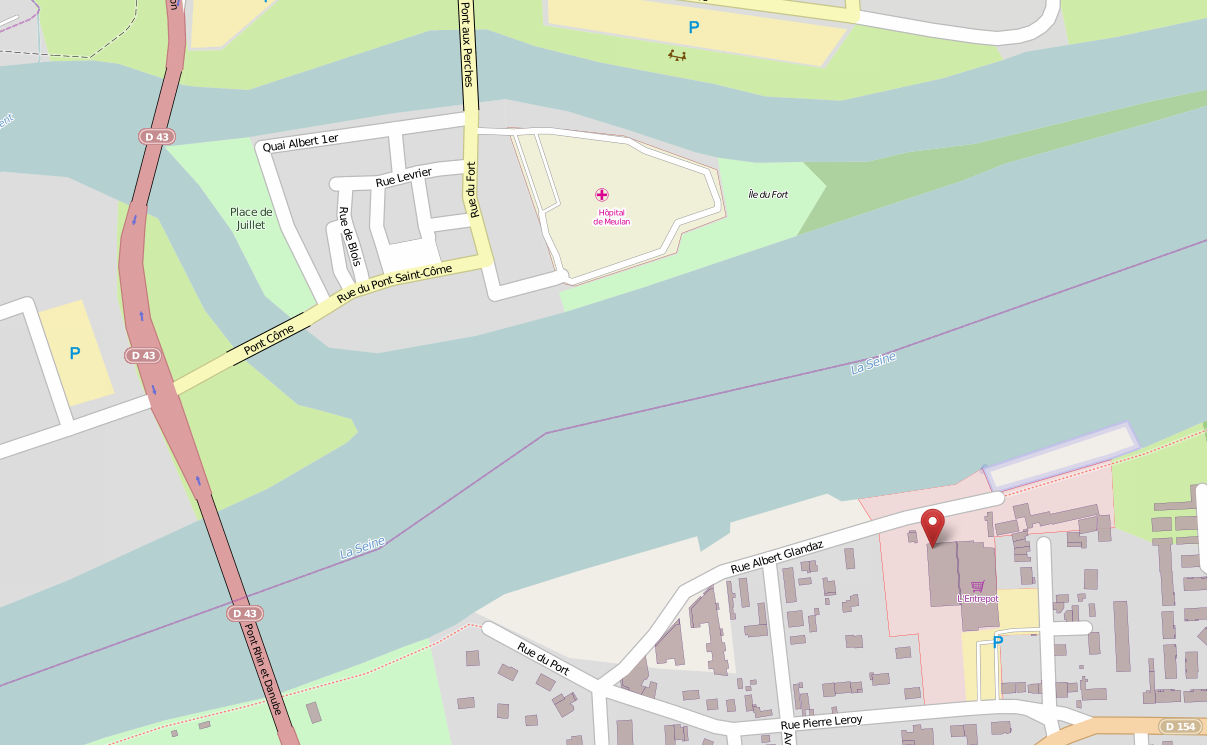
Course area Meulan

== Weather conditions ==
The race was troublesome due to an almost complete absence of any wind and the existing wind was perpendicular to the course (river Seine) and blocked or diverted by trees and buildings.

== Final results ==
Two separate races were sailed. No combined results were made.

=== Race of 22 May 1900 ===
Rank	Country	Helmsman	Crew	Boat	Medalrace	
Rank	Country	Helmsman	Crew	Boat	Pos.	Pts.
1st place, gold medalist(s)	France	Pierre Gervais	Unknown	Baby	1	1:06:16
2nd place, silver medalist(s)	France	François Texier	Auguste Texier; Robert Linzeler; Jean-Baptiste Charcot	Quand-Même	2	1:08:54
3rd place, bronze medalist(s)	France	Henri Monnot	Léon Tellier; Gaston Cailleux	Sarcelle	3	1:19:31
4	France	Maurice Monnot	Unknown	Souriceau	4	1:21:01
5	France	Jean d'Estournelles de Constant	Unknown	Plume-Patte	5	1:21:37
6	France	George Semichon	Unknown	Giselle	6	1:23:20
	France	Émile Sacré	Unknown	Fantlet	DNF	NA

Legend: DNF – Did not finish;
Gender: – male; – female;

=== Race of 24 May 1900 ===
Rank	Country	Helmsman	Crew	Boat	Medalrace	
Rank	Country	Helmsman	Crew	Boat	Pos.	Pts.
1st place, gold medalist(s)	France	Émile Sacré	Unknown	Fantlet	1	1:35:59
2nd place, silver medalist(s)	France	François Texier	Auguste Texier; Robert Linzeler; Jean-Baptiste Charcot	Quand-Même	2	1:40:42
3rd place, bronze medalist(s)	France	Pierre Gervais	Unknown	Baby	3	1:48:44
4	France	Henri Monnot	Léon Tellier; Gaston Cailleux	Sarcelle	4	2:07:52
5	France	Maurice Monnot	Unknown	Souriceau	5	2:08:04
6	France	George Semichon	Unknown	Giselle	6	2:34:09
	France	Jean d'Estournelles de Constant	Unknown	Plume-Patte	DNF	NA

Legend: DNF – Did not finish;
Gender: – male; – female;

== Other information ==
Initially only the race on 22 May 1900 was part of the Olympic program. However the race on the 24 May 1900, initially part of the Exposition Universelle program, was afterwards awarded with an Olympic status.
