= Peder Lykkeberg =

Danish swimmer

Personal information
- Full name: Peder Rudolph Lykkeberg
- Nationality: Danish
- Born: 11 February 1878 Skanderborg, Denmark
- Died: 23 December 1944 (aged 66) Copenhagen, Denmark

Sport
- Sport: Swimming
Medal record
Representing Denmark
Olympic Games
Bronze medal – third place	1900 Paris	Underwater swimming

Peder Rudolph Lykkeberg (11 February 1878 – 23 December 1944) was a Danish swimmer who competed at the 1900 Summer Olympics. He won the bronze medal in the underwater swimming competition. This event was held only in 1900. Lykkeberg had the longest time underwater (90.0 seconds compared to the winner's 68.4 seconds) and swam further than the other contestants (covering more than the winner's 60.00 metres), but Lykkeberg swam in a circle—and the distance for the scoring in the event was measured as a straight line from the starting point, resulting in his distance being credited as only 28.50 metres.
