= Shooting at the 1900 Summer Olympics – Men's 20 metre rapid fire pistol =

Olympic shooting event

Men's 20 metre military pistol at the Games of the II Olympiad
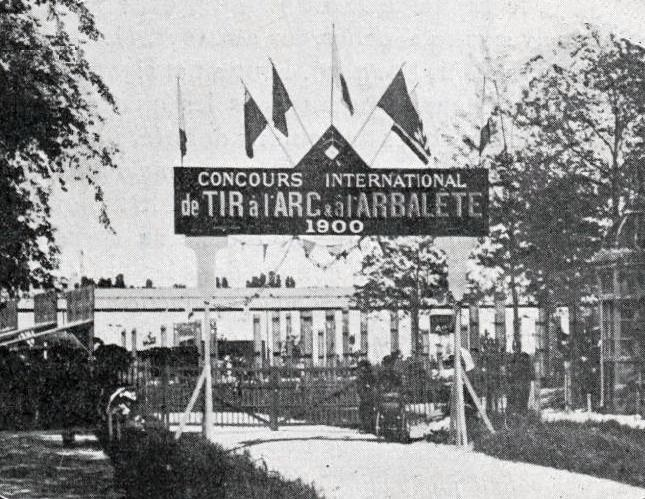
- Entrance to the target stand
- Venue: Satory
- Dates: August 1–4, 1900
- Competitors: 6 from 2 nations
- Winning score: 58

Medalists
1st place, gold medalist(s)		Maurice Larrouy; France
2nd place, silver medalist(s)		Léon Moreaux; France
3rd place, bronze medalist(s)		Eugène Balme; France

The men's 20 metre rapid fire (or military) pistol was one of the competitions in the 1900 Summer Olympics shooting events in Paris. It was held from August 1 to August 4, 1900. Six athletes from 2 nations competed. This event was contested for prize money by professionals. It is no longer included in the International Olympic Committee website's database of Olympic medal events. Five of the six shooters were from France; the host nation swept the medals as Maurice Larrouy won with Léon Moreaux second and Eugène Balme third.

== Background ==
This was the second appearance of what would become standardised as the men's ISSF 25 meter rapid fire pistol event, the only event on the 2020 programme that traces back to 1896. The event has been held at every Summer Olympics except 1904 and 1928 (when no shooting events were held) and 1908; it was nominally open to women from 1968 to 1980, although very few women participated these years. There is no women's equivalent on the Olympic programme, as of 2021. The 1900 event was very different from the 1896 event; it was open to professionals, shot at a distance of 20 metres instead of 25 metres, used 6 shots instead of 30, had targets with 10 points rather than 6 points, dropped the multiplicative scoring method, and had completely different requirements for the pistols used.

== Competition format ==
The competition had each shooter fire 6 shots at 20 metres. The targets had 10 scoring rings. The maximum score was 60 points. Tie-breaking procedures are unknown.

== Schedule ==
Date	Time	Round
Wednesday, 1 August 1900	8:00	Final

== Results ==
The format was one series of six shots for a possible 60 points. It is not known how the five-way tie at 57 points was broken.

Rank	Shooter	Nation	Score	Prize (FFr)
1st place, gold medalist(s)	Maurice Larrouy	France	58	200
2nd place, silver medalist(s)	Léon Moreaux	France	57	150
3rd place, bronze medalist(s)	Eugène Balme	France	57	100
4	Paul Moreau	France	57	75
5	Paul Probst	Switzerland	57	50
6	Joseph Labbé	France	57	40
