= Swimming at the 1900 Summer Olympics – Men's underwater swimming =

Men's underwater swimming at the Games of the II Olympiad
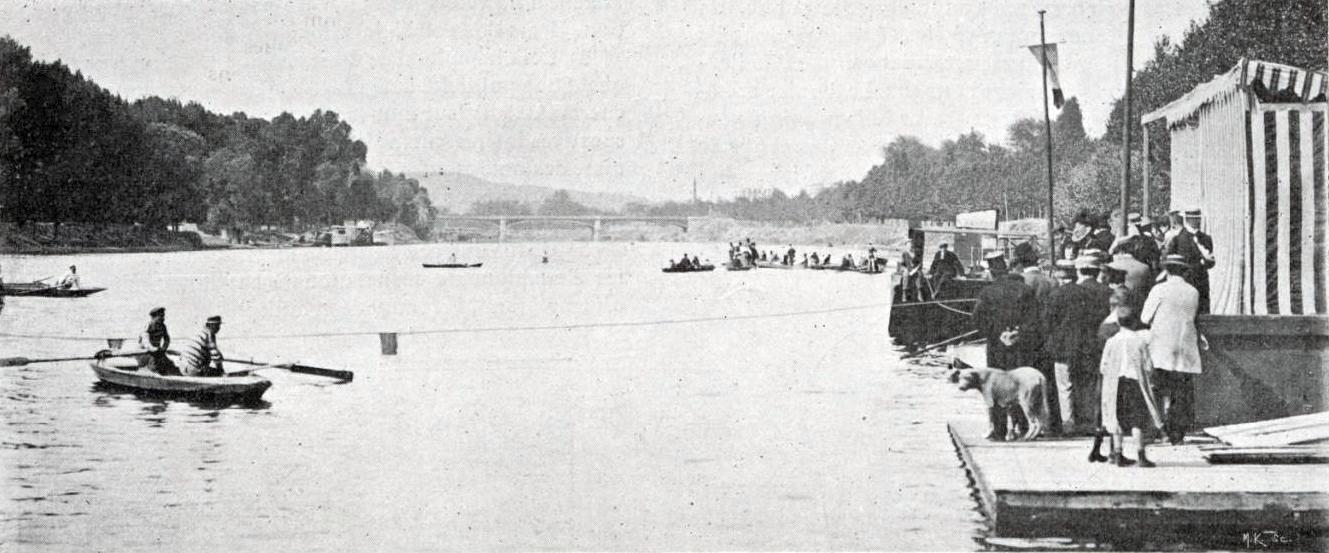
- The swimming venue in 1900
- Venue: River Seine
- Date: August 12
- Competitors: 14 from 4 nations
- Winning score: 188.4

Medalists
1st place, gold medalist(s)		Charles Devendeville; France
2nd place, silver medalist(s)		André Six; France
3rd place, bronze medalist(s)		Peder Lykkeberg; Denmark

The men's underwater swimming was an event on the Swimming at the 1900 Summer Olympics schedule in Paris. It was held on 12 August in the Seine. There were 14 competitors from 4 nations. The event was won by Charles Devendeville of France, with his countryman André Six taking second. Denmark's Peder Lykkeberg took third despite being clearly the best underwater swimmer; he swam in circles though the distance portion of the score was measured in a straight line.

== Background ==
The 1900 Games were the only occasion such an event was held. It was not featured at later Olympic games because of lack of spectator appeal.

== Competition format ==
The score was given by adding one point for each second and two points for each metre swum underwater. The distance was measured in a straight line from the starting point.

== Schedule ==
Date	Time	Round
Monday, 12 August 1900	9:00	Final

== Results ==
Rank	Swimmer	Nation	Seconds	Metres	Score
1st place, gold medalist(s)	Charles Devendeville	France	68.4	60.00	188.4
2nd place, silver medalist(s)	André Six	France	65.4	60.00	185.4
3rd place, bronze medalist(s)	Peder Lykkeberg	Denmark	90.0	28.50	147.0
4	de Romand	France	50.2	47.50	145.2
5	Léon Tisserand	France	48.0	30.75	109.5
6	Hans Aniol	Germany	30.0	36.95	103.9
7	Menault	France	38.4	32.50	103.4
8	Louis Marc	France	32.0	34.00	100.0
9	Pierre Peyrusson	France	29.6	31.00	91.6
10	Paul Kaisermann	France	56.8	16.10	89.0
11	Jean Leclerq	France	28.0	30.00	88.0
12	Chevrand	France	32.0	20.00	72.0
13	Alois Anderlé	Austria	22.4	23.50	69.4
14	Eucher	France	23.0	21.50	66.0
