= François Texier =

French sailor

Personal information
- Nationality: French
- Born: 17 January 1848
- Died: 24 January 1930 (aged 82)

Sailing career
- Sport: Sailing
- Club: CVP
- Class(es): 0 to 0.5 ton 0.5 to 1 ton 1 to 2 ton 3 to 10 ton Open class
Competition record
Sailing
Representing France
Olympic Games
Silver medal – second place	1900 Paris	0 to 0.5 ton 1st race
Silver medal – second place	1900 Paris	0 to 0.5 ton 2nd race

François Texier (17 January 1848 – 24 January 1930) was a French sailor who represented his country at the 1900 Summer Olympics in Meulan, France. With crew members Auguste Texier, Jean-Baptiste Charcot and Robert Linzeler Texier as helmsman took the 2nd place in first race of the 0 to 0.5 ton and finished 2nd in the second race. With Auguste Texier he finished 8th in the 0.5 to 1 ton. Also with Texier he took part in the 1 to 2 ton. They finished 7th in the first race and 6th in the second race. He was born in L'Île-Saint-Denis.
