= Henry Maingot =

French sailor

Personal information
- Nationality: French
- Born: 1 December 1863
- Died: 18 February 1919 (aged 55)

Sport

Sailing career
- Class(es): 3 to 10 ton Open class
- Club: CVP

Henry Maingot (1 December 1863 – 18 February 1919) was a French sailor who competed in the 1900 Summer Olympics in Meulan, France. Maingot took the 8th position in the 1st race of the 3 to 10 ton.
