= Henri Monnot =

French sailor

Personal information
- Nationality: French

Sailing career
- Sport: Sailing
- Classes: 0 to 0.5 ton Open class
Competition record
Sailing
Representing France
Olympic Games
Bronze medal – third place	1900 Paris	0 to 0.5 ton 1st race

Henri Monnot (French: [ɑ̃ʁi mɔnɔ]) was a French sailor who represented his country at the 1900 Summer Olympics in Meulan, France. With crew Léon Tellier and Gaston Cailleux and himself as helmsman, he took 3rd place in the first race of the 0 to 0.5 ton and finished 4th in the second race.
