= Jacques la Caze =

French politician

- Born: Henri Aimé Jacques la Caze; 24 July 1858; Gelos, France
- Died: 3 November 1910 (aged 52); Buenos Aires, Argentina
- Occupation: Politician

Henri Aimé Jacques, Baron la Caze (24 July 1858 – 3 November 1910) was a French politician and equestrian. He served as a general councillor and participated at the 1900 Summer Olympics.

== Personal life ==
La Caze was born in Gelos on 24 July 1858. His family was active politically; his father, Louis-Jacques la Caze, served in the French Parliament as both a deputy and senator. He died in Buenos Aires, Argentina, on 3 November 1910.

== Politics ==
La Caze served as general councillor for Lasseube, Basses-Pyrénées.

== Equestrian ==
La Caze competed in the mail coach event at the 1900 Summer Olympics.
