= Charles Devendeville =

French swimmer (1882–1914)

Personal information
- Born: 8 March 1882 Lesquin, France
- Died: 19 September 1914 (aged 32) Reims, France

Sport
- Sport: Swimming
Medal record
Representing France
Olympic Games
Gold medal – first place	1900 Paris	Underwater

Charles Devendeville (8 March 1882 – 19 September 1914) was a French swimmer and Olympic champion. He competed at the 1900 Olympic Games in Paris, where he received a gold medal in the underwater swimming. He died of injuries during the First World War, at age 32.

== See also ==
- List of Olympians killed in World War I
