= Eugène Laverne =

French sailor

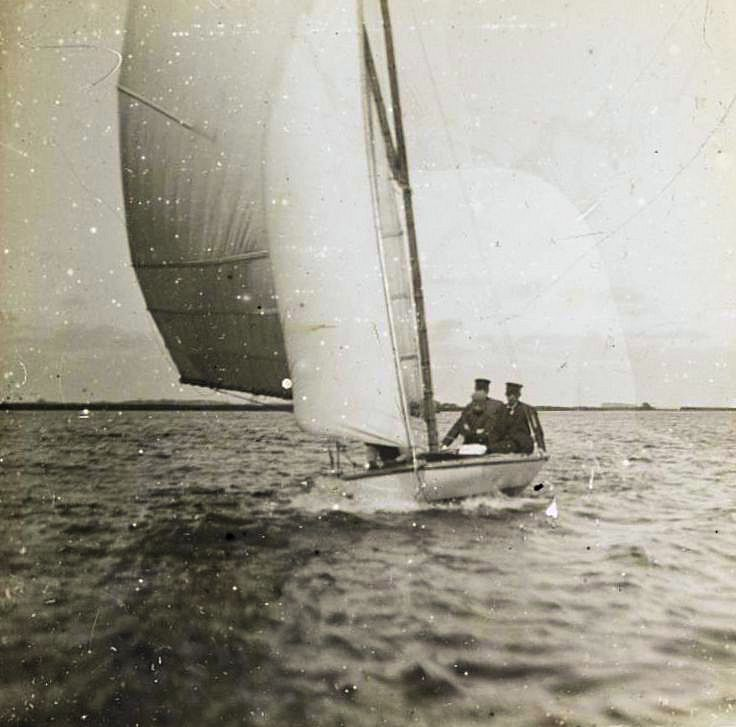
- The yacht Sidi-Fekkar that was helmed by Eugène Laverne during the 1900 Olympics

Personal information
- Full name: Albert Eugène Laverne
- Born: 13 April 1866 Paris, Second French Empire
- Died: 23 June 1941 (aged 75) Saint-Mandé, Vichy France

Sport

Sailing career
- Class(es): 0.5 to 1 ton 1 to 2 ton Open class

Albert Eugène Laverne (13 April 1866 – 23 June 1941) was a sailor from France, who represented his country at the 1900 Summer Olympics in Meulan, France. Laverne as helmsman, was disqualified in first race of the 0.5 to 1 ton and did not finish in the second race. He did this with the boat Sidi-Fekkar.
