= Maurice Monnot (sailor) =

French sailor

Personal information
- Nationality: French

Sailing career
- Sport: Sailing
- Classes: 0 to 0.5 ton Open class

Maurice Monnot (French: [mɔʁis mɔnɔ]) was a French sailor who represented his country at the 1900 Summer Olympics in Meulan, France. Monnot as helmsman took the 4th place in first race of the 0 to 0.5 ton and finished 5th in the second race.
