= Marcel Moisand =

French sailor

Personal information
- Nationality: French
- Born: 27 July 1874
- Died: 15 September 1903 (aged 29)

Sport

Sailing career
- Class(es): 1 to 2 ton Open class

Marcel Moisand (27 July 1874 – 15 September 1903) was a French sailor who competed in the 1900 Summer Olympics. He was a member of the boat Ducky, which took the 5th place in the first race of 1 to 2 ton and the 7th place in the second race of 1 to 2 ton class.
