= André Six =

French swimmer

Personal information
- Born: July 15, 1879 Lambersart, France
- Died: April 1, 1915 (aged 35) Chelles, France

Sport
- Sport: Swimming
Medal record
Representing France
Olympic Games
Silver medal – second place	1900 Paris	Underwater

André Jules Henri Six (15 July 1879 – 1 April 1915) was a French swimmer and Olympic medalist. He competed at the 1900 Olympic Games in Paris, where he received a silver medal in underwater swimming. He was killed in action during World War I.

== See also ==
- List of Olympians killed in World War I
