= Georges Warenhorst =

French sailor

Personal information
- Full name: Georges Camille Warenhorst
- Nationality: French
- Born: 15 February 1862 Paris, Second French Empire
- Died: 6 December 1939 (aged 77)

Sailing career
- Sport: Sailing
- Class(es): 1 to 2 ton Open class

Georges Camille Warenhorst (15 February 1862 – 6 December 1939) was a French sailor who competed in the 1900 Summer Olympics. He was a member of the boat Freia, which took the 6th place in the first race and the 5th place in the second race of 1 to 2 ton class.
