= Eugène Balme =

French sport shooter (1874–1914)

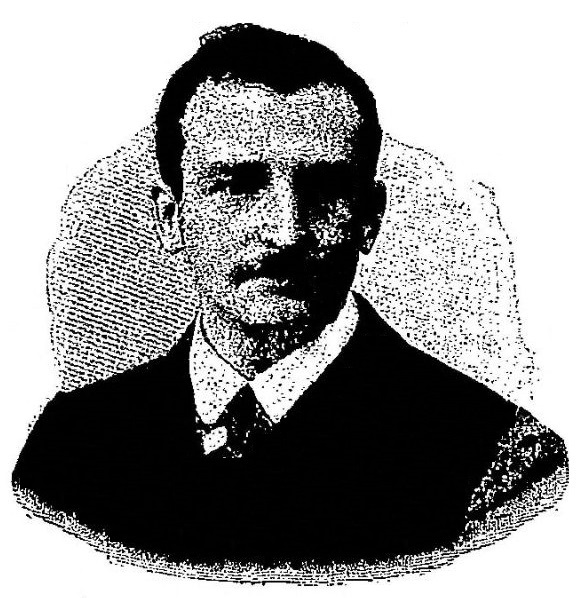
- Eugène Balme in 1902

Personal information
- Born: 22 November 1874 Oullins, France
- Died: 24 February 1914 (aged 39) Paris, France
- Height: 170 cm (5 ft 7 in)

Sport
- Sport: Sport shooting
Medal record
Men's shooting
Representing France
Olympic Games
Bronze medal – third place	1900 Paris	20m rapid fire pistol
Bronze medal – third place	1908 London	Team free rifle

Eugène Jean François Balme (22 November 1874 – 24 February 1914) was a French sport shooter who competed at the 1900 Summer Olympics in Paris and 1908 Summer Olympics in London.

In 1900 at Paris he won the bronze medal in the 25 metre rapid fire pistol event. Eight years later at London he won another bronze medal in the team free rifle event and was fourth in team military rifle event.

He was born in Oullins and died in Paris. He killed himself in 1914.
