= Lecointre =

French sailor

Personal information
- Nationality: French

Sport

Sailing career
- Class(es): 1 to 2 ton Open class

Lecointre was a French sailor who competed in the 1900 Summer Olympics. He was a member of the boat Alcyon, which took the 8th place in the first race of 1 to 2 ton and did not finish in the second race of 1 to 2 ton class.
