= Pierre Gervais =

French yacht racer

Personal information
- Nationality: French
- Born: 21 September 1870 Châtellerault
- Died: 2 August 1960 (aged 89) Cerdon, Loiret

Sailing career
- Sport: Sailing
- Class(es): 0 to 0.5 ton Open class
Competition record
Sailing
Representing France
Olympic Games
Gold medal – first place	1900 Paris	0 to .5 ton 1st race
Bronze medal – third place	1900 Paris	0 to .5 ton 2nd race
- Updated on 8 May 2015

Pierre Gervais (21 September 1870 – 2 August 1960) was a French sailor and Olympic champion.

Gervais competed at the 1900 Summer Olympics, where he won first prize in one of the two races in the 0-½ ton class, and obtained a third place in the other race.
