= Gaston Cailleux =

French sailor

Personal information
- Nationality: French
- Born: 6 December 1870
- Died: 28 January 1946 (aged 75)

Sailing career
- Sport: Sailing
- Class(es): 0 to 0.5 ton Open class
Competition record
Sailing
Representing France
Olympic Games
Bronze medal – third place	1900 Paris	0 to 0.5 ton 1st race

Gaston Cailleux (6 December 1870 – 28 January 1946) was a sailor from France who represented his country at the 1900 Summer Olympics in Meulan, France. With Henri Monnot as helmsman and fellow crewmember Léon Tellier, Cailleux took 3rd place in first race of the 0 to 0.5 ton and finished 4th in the second race.
