= Maurice Larrouy (sport shooter) =

French sport shooter

Olympic medal record

Men's shooting

Representing France
Gold medal – first place	1900 Paris	Men's 20 m rapid fire pistol

Maurice Larrouy (born 4 December 1872 in Toulouse, date and place of death unknown) was a French sport shooter who competed in the late 19th century and early 20th century in pistol shooting. He participated in Shooting at the 1900 Summer Olympics in Paris and won a gold medal in the men's 25 metre rapid fire pistol.
