= Édouard Beaudoin =

French archer

Édouard Beaudoin Jr. was a French archer. He competed at the 1900 Summer Olympics in Paris and the 1908 Summer Olympics in London.

Beaudoin competed in one event in 1900, the Au Cordon Doré at 50 metres competition. He took fifth place with a score of 26 points in the event, five points behind the leader, Henri Hérouin. In 1908, he entered the men's double York round event in 1908, taking 25th place with 215 points. He then competed in the Continental style contest, placing 10th at 206 points.
