= Léon Tellier =

French sailor

Personal information
- Nationality: French

Sailing career
- Sport: Sailing
- Class(es): 0 to 0.5 ton Open class
Competition record
Sailing
Representing France
Olympic Games
Bronze medal – third place	1900 Paris	0 to 0.5 ton 1st race

Léon Tellier was a French sailor, who represented his country at the 1900 Summer Olympics in Meulan, France. With Henri Monnot as helmsman and fellow crewmember Gaston Cailleux, Tellier took 3rd place in the first race of the 0 to 0.5 ton and finished 4th place in the second race.
