= Marcel Dohis =

French track cyclist

- Dohis in the 1904 "Les Trois Sports" thriathlon event

Personal information
- Full name: Albert Marcel Marie Paul Dohis
- Nationality: French
- Born: 25 August 1880 Paris (11th), France
- Died: 20th-century

Cycling career
- Sport: Cycling
- Discipline: Track
- Role: Rider

Amateur team
- 1896–1904: Union Athlétique du Lycée Michelet; Association Vélocipédique d'Amateurs; Cercle des sports de la Marne

Albert Marcel Marie Paul Dohis, usually named Marcel Dohis (born 25 August 1880), was a French track cyclist during the 1890s and 1900s. He also competed in rowing, race walking and triathlons.

== Biography ==
Dohis was born in the 11th arrondissement of Paris, France, on 25 August 1880. He competed in cycling for several Parisian sporting clubs between 1896 and 1904, including the Union Athlétique du Lycée Michelet, the Association Vélocipédique d'Amateurs and the Cercle des sports de la Marne.

Dohis represented France in track cycling at the 1900 Summer Olympics, held in Paris. He competed in the men's sprint and men's points race. In the points race, he finished equal ninth. In the sprint event he finished second in his heat, but was afterwards eliminated in the quarter final, losing from Ferdinand Vasserot.

In 1900 and 1901, Dohis competed in the Grand Prix de Paris, one of the most important track cycling competition in that era.

Dohis also participated in other sports, including racewalking and rowing. He competed during the early 1900s in "Les Trois Sports" in the Bois de Boulogne, one of the earliest thriathlon (variant) competition in France. He played in these earliest editions a central role.
