= Émile Gontier =

French athlete

Émile Eugène Gontier (14 November 1877 in Argenteuil – 1947) was a French track and field athlete who competed at the 1900 Summer Olympics in Paris, France. Gontier competed in the pole vault, tying for fourth place by clearing 3.10 metres. He also placed thirteenth in the discus throw.

== Sources ==
- De Wael, Herman. Herman's Full Olympians: "Athletics 1900". Accessed 18 March 2006. Available electronically at .
- Mallon, Bill (1998). The 1900 Olympic Games, Results for All Competitors in All Events, with Commentary. Jefferson, North Carolina: McFarland & Company, Inc., Publishers. ISBN 0-7864-0378-0.
- Émile Gontier at Olympics at Sports-Reference.com (archived)
