= Henri Helle =

French archer (1873–1901)

Olympic medal record

Men's Archery
Silver medal – second place	1900 Paris	Au Chapelet 50 metres

Henri Hyacinthe Helle (4 September 1873 in Thiescourt – 21 June 1901 in Thiescourt) competed for France at the 1900 Summer Olympics, in archery. Helle competed in two events, taking second place in the 50 metre Au Chapelet event and fourth place in the 50 metre Au Cordon Doré competition. His score of 27 points in the Au Cordon Doré was one point behind the third-place archer, Émile Fisseux. No scores are known for the Au Chapelet competition.

== See also ==
- Archery at the 1900 Summer Olympics

== Notes ==
1. - Prizes at the time were silver medals for first place and bronze medals for second, as well as usually including cash awards. The current gold, silver, bronze medal system was initiated at the 1904 Summer Olympics. The International Olympic Committee has retroactively assigned medals in the current system to top three placers at early Olympics.
