= Robert Linzeler =

French sailor

Personal information
- Full name: Robert Linzeler
- Born: 7 March 1872 Paris, France
- Died: 25 January 1941 (aged 68) Paris, France

Sport

Sailing career
- Class(es): 0 to 0.5 ton Open class
- Club: CVA
Medal record
Sailing
Representing France
Olympic Games
| Silver medal – second place | 1900 Paris | 0 to 0.5 ton 1st race |
| Silver medal – second place | 1900 Paris | 0 to 0.5 ton 2nd race |

Robert Linzeler (7 March 1872 – 25 January 1941) was a French sailor who represented his country at the 1900 Summer Olympics in Meulan, France. With François Texier as helmsman and fellow crewmembers Jean-Baptiste Charcot and Auguste Texier, Linzeler took the 2nd place in first race of the 0 to 0.5 ton and finished 2nd in the second race.
