= Georges Sémichon =

French sailor

Personal information
- Full name: Georges Louis Paul Sémichon
- Born: 25 September 1865 Paris, Second French Empire
- Died: 12 August 1914 (aged 48)

Sailing career
- Sport: Sailing
- Class: 0 to 0.5 ton

Georges Louis Paul Sémichon (25 September 1865 – 12 August 1914) was a French sailor who represented his country at the 1900 Summer Olympics in Meulan, France. Semichon, as helmsman, took the 6th place in first race of the 0 to 0.5 ton and finished 6th in the second race.
