= Émile Sacré (sailor) =

French sailor

Personal information
- Nationality: French
- Born: 16 May 1861 Lille
- Died: 4 September 1933 (aged 72) Rouen

Sailing career
- Sport: Sailing
- Class: 0 to 0.5 ton Open class
Medal record
Sailing
Representing France
Olympic Games
Gold medal – first place	1900 Paris	0 to .5 ton 2nd race

Émile Sacré (16 May 1861 in Lille – 4 September 1933 in Rouen) was a French sailor and Olympic champion. Sacré competed at the 1900 Summer Olympics, where he won first prize in one of the two races in the 0-½ ton class. Sacré did not finish in the other race.
