= Jean d'Estournelles de Constant =

French sailor

Personal information
- Full name: Louis Etienne Jean Léonce Balluet d'Estournelles de Constant de Rebecque
- Born: 15 September 1859 La Flèche, Second French Empire
- Died: 31 July 1949 (aged 89) Paris, France

Sport

Sailing career
- Class: 0 to 0.5 ton 0.5 to 1 ton Open class

Louis Etienne Jean Léonce Balluet d'Estournelles de Constant de Rebecque (15 September 1859 – 31 July 1949) was a sailor from France, who represented his country at the 1900 Summer Olympics in Meulan, France. Jean d'Estournelles de Constant, as helmsman of the boat Pierre et Jean, took the 5th place in first race of the 0.5 to 1 ton and did not finish in the second race.
