= Émile Fisseux =

French archer

Olympic medal record

Men's Archery
Bronze medal – third place	1900 Paris	Au Cordon Doré 50 metres

Émile Léon Fisseux (15 February 1868 in Paris - 9 December 1916) was a French competitor in the sport of archery. Fisseux competed in one event in Archery at the 1900 Summer Olympics, taking third place in the 50 metre Au Cordon Doré competition. His score of 28 points was one point behind the second-place archer, Hubert Van Innis, and three points behind the winner, Henri Hérouin. While Fisseux received no medal at the time, he is currently considered to be a bronze medallist by the International Olympic Committee.

Fisseux also competed in Archery at the 1908 Summer Olympics, taking 13th place in the Continental style event with 185 points.
