= Henri Hérouin =

French archer (1876–1926)

Olympic medal record

Men's archery

Representing France
Gold medal – first place	1900 Paris	Au Cordon Doré, 50 metres

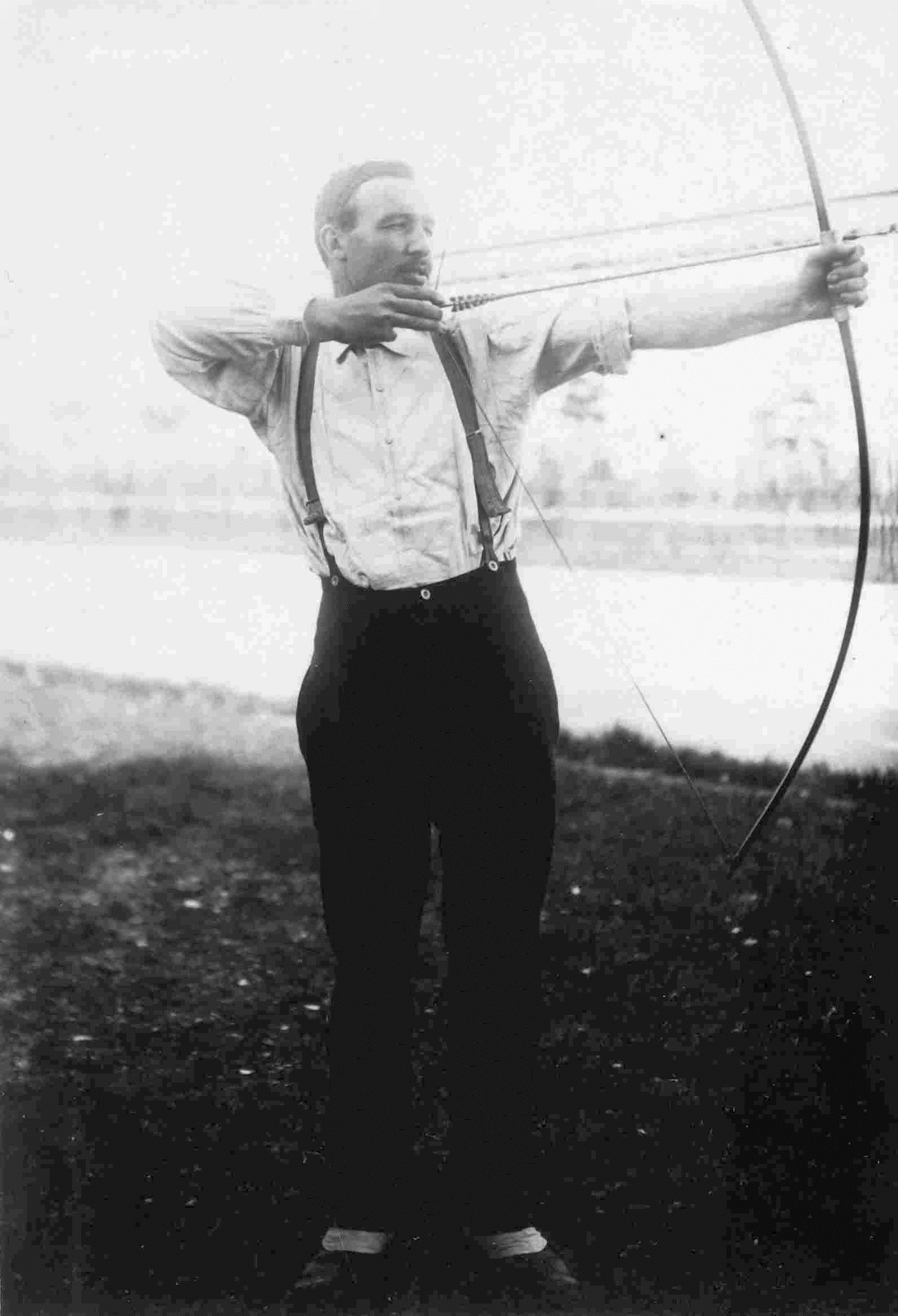

Henri Louis Hérouin, Sr. (French pronunciation: [ɑ̃ʁi eʁwɛ̃]; 19 February 1876 in Congis-sur-Thérouanne – 6 January 1926 in Pomponne) was a French competitor in the sport of archery. Hérouin won the first prize, and is now considered by the International Olympic Committee to have won the gold medal, in the 50 metre Au Cordon Doré event at the first Olympic appearance of archery, in the 1900 Summer Olympics in Paris. His score of 31 put him 2 points above his closest competitor Hubert Van Innis.

Hérouin also beat van Innis in the Championnat du Monde event, 22-16. This event is not considered Olympic by the IOC.

== See also ==
- Archery at the 1900 Summer Olympics

== Notes ==
1. - Prizes at the time were silver medals for first place and bronze medals for second, as well as usually including cash awards. The current gold, silver, bronze medal system was initiated at the 1904 Summer Olympics.
