= Pourtalès =

Pourtalès or de Pourtalès may refer to:

== People ==
- Arthur de Pourtalès, Comte de Pourtalès-Gorgier (1844–1928), Swiss-French diplomat
- Bernard de Pourtalès (Bernard Alexandre George Edmond de Pourtalès, 1870–1935), Swiss infantry captain and sailor who competed in the 1900 Summer Olympics
- Friedrich von Pourtalès (1853–1928), German diplomat who served as Ambassador to the Russian Empire
- Guy de Pourtalès (1881–1941), Swiss author
- Hélène de Pourtalès (born Helen Barbey, 1868–1945), American-born sailor who competed for Switzerland in the 1900 Summer Olympics
- Hermann de Pourtalès (Hermann Alexander de Pourtalès, 1847–1904), Swiss sailor who competed in the 1900 Summer Olympics
- James-Alexandre de Pourtalès, Comte de Pourtalès-Gorgier (1776–1855), Swiss-French banker, diplomat, and art collector
- Jean de Pourtales (born 1965), French racing driver
- Louis François de Pourtalès (1824–1880), American naturalist
- Marie de Pourtalès–Gorgier (born Marie Boozer, 1846–1908), American socialite, countess and diplomatic spouse
- Mélanie de Pourtalès (born Mélanie Renouard de Bussière, 1836–1914), French salonnière and courtier

== Other uses ==
- Château de Pourtalès, historic chateau in Bas-Rhin, Alsace, France.
- Hôtel de Pourtalès, historic building in Paris, France
