= A. Lanfear Norrie =

American businessman

- Born: July 27, 1857; New York City, New York, U.S.
- Died: December 22, 1910 (aged 53); New York City, New York, U.S.
- Spouse: Ethel Lynde Barbey (m. 1895)
- Children: 3
- Parent(s): Gordon Norrie; Emily Frances Lanfear Norrie
- Relatives: Adam Norrie (grandfather)

Ambrose Lanfear Norrie (July 27, 1857 – December 22, 1910) was an American businessman and social leader during the Gilded Age.

== Early life ==
Norrie was born on July 27, 1857, in New York City. He was the eldest son of Gordon Norrie (1830–1909) and Emily Frances (née Lanfear) Norrie (1836–1917). Among his siblings was Mary Lanfear Norrie, Dr. Van Horne Norrie, Sara Goodhue Norrie, Adam Gordon Norrie (who married Margaret Lewis Morgan, sister of Geraldine Livingston Morgan), Emily Lanfear Norrie, who died unmarried in 1936.

His paternal grandparents were Mary Johanna (née van Horne) Norrie and Adam Norrie, a native of Aberdeen, Scotland, who was an iron merchant and a founder of St. Luke's Hospital. His maternal grandparents were Ambrose Lanfear and Mary (née Hill) Lanfear. His aunt, Louisa Sarah Lanfear, was married to Ogilvie Blair Graham and David A. Ogden Jr. (son of David A. Ogden). Among his cousins was Norrie Sellar, a prominent cotton broker who married Sybil Katherine Sherman (the daughter of William Watts Sherman).

== Career ==
Norrie, a broker, discovered the iron ore of the Gogebic Range of the Upper Peninsula of Michigan (which became known as the Lorrie Mine) in September 1882. He was important in the founding of the town of Ironwood, Michigan. He was also a director of the Ohio Mining and Manufacturing Company and the Buffalo, Rochester & Pittsburgh Railroad.

=== Society life ===
Norrie was prominent in New York society. He was a close friend of Lispenard Stewart, with whom he threw a 100-person dinner and evening of vaudeville before the two traveled to Mexico on vacation in 1893. Another close friend, John Rhea Barton Willing (who was Vincent Astor's uncle), left Norrie a Stradivarius violin in his will. He was also a member of the Union Club, the Calumet Club, the Racquet Club, the Metropolitan Club, the Downtown Club, the Riding Club, and the Tuxedo Club.

== Personal life ==
In 1890, Norrie's engagement to heiress Frances Evelyn "Fannie" Bostwick was announced. She was the daughter of Jabez A. Bostwick, a founding partner of Standard Oil. However, a month later, the engagement was declared off by "mutual consent". Fannie eventually married Capt. Albert J. Carstairs of the Royal Irish Rifles, and became the mother of Joe Carstairs before that marriage ended. She remarried three more times, including her last to Serge Voronoff.

On April 23, 1893, at a grand ball Norrie's family again announced his engagement, this time to Amy Bend. Amy, a close friend of Emily Vanderbilt Sloane, was the daughter of banker George H. Bend and was called "the New York society beauty par excellence." Again, less than a month later, the engagement was called off and, shortly thereafter, Amy was courted by William Kissam Vanderbilt. After rumors that she was to marry John Jacob Astor III proved false, Amy later married Cortlandt F. Bishop in 1899. Norrie was also reportedly engaged to Emily Montague Tooker, daughter of Gabriel Mead Tooker. The purported impending marriage never took place and, instead, Emily married J. Wadsworth Ritchie in 1895.

In 1895, Norrie was married to Ethel Lynde Barbey (1873–1959). Ethel was the daughter of Henry Isaac Barbey and Mary Lorillard Barbey, and granddaughter of tobacco magnate Pierre Lorillard III. Among her many siblings was Hélène Barbey, the wife of Count von Pourtalès; Eva Barbey, who married the Baron de Neuflize; and Pierre Lorillard Barbey, who married Florence Flower, niece of Captain Charles H. Houghton. Together, they were the parents of:

- Lanfear Barbey Norrie (1896–1977), who graduated from Harvard in 1920 and became a mining engineer. He married Christobel More-Molyneux (d. 1995) of Loseley Park in Guildford, England, in 1941. They divorced in 1951, and she remarried to the Hon. William Neville Berry, son of Gomer Berry, 1st Viscount Kemsley.
- Emily Margarita "Rita" Norrie (b. 1897), who married John Wells in 1917. She later married Jacques de Morsier, of Switzerland.
- Valerie "Valérie" Norrie (1903–1999), who married Joseph Pozzo di Borgo, 4th Duke Pozzo di Borgo, in 1924. The Duke was a former lieutenant of François de La Rocque, head of the nationalist French Social Party. She inherited Villa Fantaisie from her brother upon his death in 1977.

Norrie died after an attack of pneumonia at his home, 15 East 84th Street in New York City, (Note: As of 2019, 15 East 84th Street is the home of Institute for the Study of the Ancient World at New York University. The six-story limestone townhouse between Fifth and Madison Avenues was built in 1899 by Renwick, Aspinwall & Owen and later owned by Ogden Mills Reid and purchased by the Leon Levy Foundation for the Institute.) on December 22, 1910. He was buried at Green-Wood Cemetery in Brooklyn. After his death, she married Count Armand de Jumilhac (1886–1966), a relative of the Duke of Richelieu, in 1914.

=== Descendants ===
Through his son, he was the posthumous grandfather of Christopher Lorillard Norrie (b. 1946), a farmer living in New York.

== Legacy ==
Norrie was the namesake of Norrie Park, Norrie School, Norrie mine, Norrie location and Norrie Street in Ironwood, Michigan.
