= Baudrier =

Baudrier is a surname. Notable people with the surname include:

- Jacqueline Baudrier (1922–2009), French radio and television journalist
- Jacques Baudrier (1872–?), French sailor and Olympian
- Lucien Baudrier (1861–1930), French sailor and Olympian
- Yves Baudrier (1906–1988), French composer
