= Charles Houghton =

Charles Houghton may refer to:

- Charles H. Houghton (1842–1914), Union Army soldier and Medal of Honor recipient
- Charles Frederick Houghton (1839–1898), Canadian rancher, justice of the peace, politician and soldier
