= Mary Lorillard Barbey =

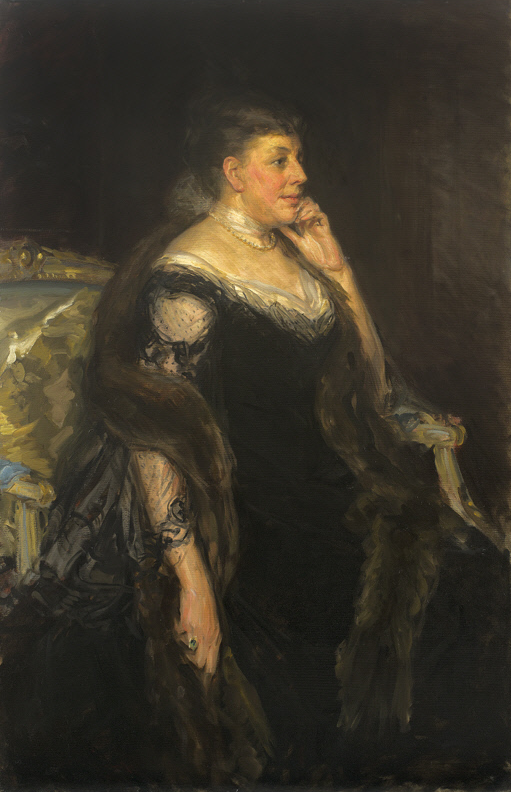
- Born: Mary Lorillard; April 17, 1841; New York City, US
- Died: April 10, 1926 (aged 84); Paris, France
- Spouse: Henry Isaac Barbey (m. 1865; died 1906)
- Parent(s): Pierre Lorillard III; Catherine Anne Griswold
- Relatives: Pierre Lorillard II (grandfather); Pierre Lorillard IV (brother); Catherine Lorillard (sister); George Lyndes Lorillard (brother)

Mary Lorillard Barbey (April 17, 1841 – April 10, 1926) was a prominent American member of New York Society during the Gilded Age. She was a daughter of Pierre Lorillard III of the Lorillard Tobacco Company.

== Early life ==
Mary Lorillard was born on April 17, 1841. She was the daughter of Pierre Lorillard III (1796–1867) and Catherine Anne (née Griswold) Lorillard (1809–1856). Her siblings included Pierre Lorillard IV; Catherine Lorillard, who married James Powell Kernochan; Jacob Lorillard; George Lyndes Lorillard, who married Marie Louise La Farge, the sister of John La Farge (and who later became Countess de Agreda after she married the Spanish-Mexican Count de Agreda); Louis Lasher Lorillard, who married Katherine Livingston Beeckman, sister of Governor Robert Livingston Beeckman; and Eva Lorillard, who married Lawrence Kip.

Her paternal grandparents were Pierre Lorillard II, a prominent tobacco manufacturer and real estate tycoon for whom the term "millionaire" was first used, and Maria Dorothea (née Schultz) Lorillard. Her mother's family owned "the great New York mercantile house of N. L. & G. Griswold, known to their rivals as "No Loss and Great Gain Griswold," importers of rum, sugar, and tea."

== Society life ==
Mrs. Barbey and her daughter Eva were included in the infamous "Four Hundred" of New York Society, as dictated by Mrs. Astor and Ward McAllister and published in The New York Times on February 16, 1892. The number 400 was reportedly the number of people who would fit into Mrs. Astor's ballroom.

Barbey and her husband were members of the Tuxedo Club and built one of the earliest residences in Tuxedo Park, New York, which was founded by her family. She was also a member of the Colonial Dames of America. In summer, the Barbeys were residents of Bellevue on Lake Geneva in Switzerland, where her husband was born in 1832. Her husband was a founding member, and a member of the vestry for 31 years, of Emmanuel Episcopal Church, also known as "The American Church," in Geneva. He donated the land for the construction of the church building, and partially financed its construction and running during the early years.

== Personal life ==
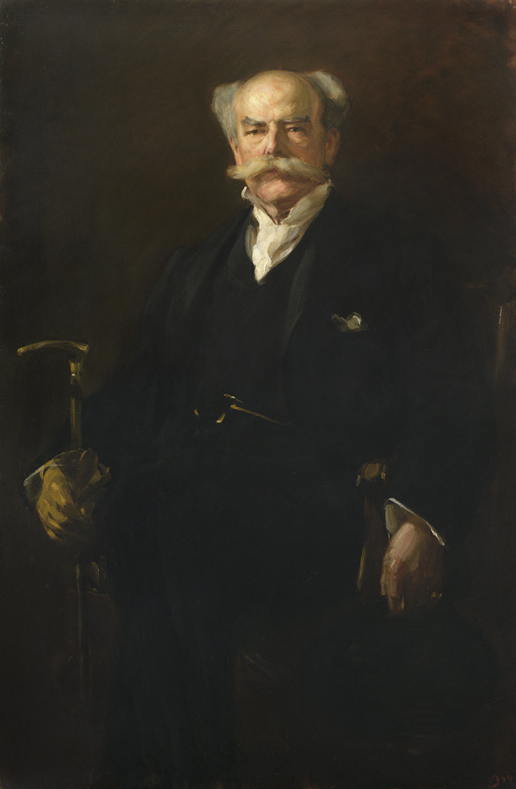
Portrait of Mary's husband Henry, by Wilhelm Heinrich Funk, 1903

On January 12, 1865, she was married to Henry Isaac Barbey (1832–1906). He was a son of Henry Barbey and Marie Helen Iselin. Through his mother, he was a nephew of Adrian Georg Iselin and cousin of Charles Oliver Iselin. Barbey was a financier and a director of the Buffalo, Rochester and Pittsburgh Railway. They lived at 17 West 38th Street in New York City. Together, they were the parents of:

- Hélène Barbey (1868–1945), who married Hermann Alexander, Count von Pourtalès (1847–1904) in 1891 after the death of his first wife, Marguerite Marcet. They both competed in the 1900 Summer Olympics, with Hélène becoming the first woman to win a gold medal. Pourtalès was a captain of the Cuirassiers of the Guard.
- Henry G. Barbey (1873–1938), who married Sabine Wood (née Struthers) Beekman (1889–1950), the former wife of Dr. Fenwick Beekman, in 1934. He served as president of the board of governors of the New York Hospital.
- Ethel Lynde Barbey (1873–1959), who married Ambrose Lanfear Norrie (1857–1910) in 1895. After his death, she married Count Odet Armand Marie de Jumilhac, a relative of the Duke of Richelieu.
- Marguerite "Rita" Barbey (1876–1955), who married Gilbert Compton Elliott (1871–1931), son of Frederick and Lady Charlotte Elliot and grandson of Admiral George Elliot and Sir James Carnegie, 5th Baronet, in 1910.
- Eva Barbey (1879–1943), born in Bellevue, baptised Eveline, who married André Poupart, Baron de Neuflize (1875–1926), eldest son of Jean de Neuflize, in 1903. His younger sister was Roberte Ponsonby, Countess of Bessborough. They lived in Paris and Neuilly, France.
- Mary Lorillard Barbey, who married Alfred Seton Jr. (b. 1853)
- Pierre Lorillard Barbey, born 25 March 1882 in Paris, a Harvard graduate who married Florence Flower, daughter of James de Laral Flower, in 1907.

Her husband died at their home in Bellevue on July 9, 1906. His estate was valued at $6,581,051 at the time of his death, which she inherited. Barbey moved to Paris, France living at 45 Avenue l'Alma, where she died on April 10, 1926. She was buried in Genthod or Bellevue.

=== Descendants ===
Through her daughter Hélène, she was the step-grandmother of Count Guy de Pourtalès (1881–1941), the author, and Count Raimond de Pourtalès (1882–1914), attache of the German embassy, who married Countess Luise Alexandra von Bernstorff (1888–1971), daughter of Johann Heinrich von Bernstorff, the German Ambassador to the United States in 1911. The wedding, which took place in Washington, D.C. was attended by William Howard Taft, who was then the President of the United States. After his death in 1914, Luise Alexandra remarried to Prince Johannes Baptista of Löwenstein-Wertheim-Rosenberg (1880-1956), the youngest son of Charles, 6th Prince of Löwenstein-Wertheim-Rosenberg.

Through her daughter Baroness André de Neuflize, she was the grandmother of Mademoiselle Jacqueline de Neuflize, who married Baron Jean de Watteville-Berckheim of Paris.

Through her daughter Eva, she was the grandmother of Mlle Genevieve de Neuflize, who married Count Costa de Beauregard, the son of the Marquis de Beauregard, descendants of an old French family, in 1930. Upon their wedding, de Beauregard inherited Château de Beauregard, the family residence in France on the shores of Lake Geneva.

Through her daughter Mary, she was the grandmother of Marie Seton, who married George G. Sommaripa, and Helen Seton, who was married to Auguste de Goyon, the 4th Duc de Feltre and Vicomte de Goyon.

Through her youngest son, she was the grandmother to Pierre Lorillard Barbey Jr. (1908–1989), who lived in Tuxedo Park in the 1980s. He was a noted society host, including at his oceanfront residence in Palm Beach, Florida, where he entertained Prince and Princess Alexis Obolensky Jr., Mr. and Mrs. Jacob L. Webb, Mr. and Mrs. John Jacob Astor.
