= Francisco Carrascón =

Spanish military officer

Don Francisco Carrascón (ca. 1700 – ca.1755), also known as Don Francesco Carascon, was a high ranking Spanish Military Officer and War Commissioner in the 18th Century. He was born in Zaragoza but ancestrally he was descended from the House of Carrascon of Ágreda (Castile), Cintruenigo (Navarra) and Tudela (Navarra). The founder of the Spanish House was Doctor Don Garcia Fernandez de Carrascón (ca 1480-1533), a wealthy Spanish cleric from Ágreda, Spain. He was a protonotary apostolic and personal doctor to Pope Adrian VI as well as a canon of the Cathedral of Toledo, Spain. He left his fortune in the form of a mayorazgo or family trust to his nephew Don Pedro Carrascon and his descendants. Doctor Carrascon is buried in an elaborate chapel in the Church of San Miguel Arcangel in Ágreda. The Carrascon were recognized as having Hidalgo or noble status in the mid 17th Century, but were noble going back to at least the 15th Century.

Don Francisco served as War Commissioner (Comisario de Guerra) in Orbetello in 1737–1738 just after the War of Polish Succession, and in Messina from 1739 to 1755. He was a close associate of the founder of the Passionist Order, St. Paul of the Cross and he is mentioned frequently in his letters from the era. Don Francisco was appointed Senator of Messina in 1742 under the Viceroy of Sicily, Don Eustachio, Duke of Laviefuille. He was the only one of the six senators to survive the Messina Plague of 1743. After a few decades on the Italian peninsula, he and his descendants became known by the italianized spelling of the surname Carascon.

Don Francisco was married to Donna Paula Diez, believed to be the sister of Don Antonio Filareto Diez e Palermo, a Sicilian Nobleman and Senator of Palermo in 1745 and 1764. Don Francisco and Donna Paula had five sons and three daughters. His eldest son, Don Bernabe (or Barnaba) Carrascon was a Colonel in command of the Provincial Regiments of the Kingdom of Naples, and later Commandant of Lucera. His second son, Don Antonio Carrascon, was a Lieutenant Colonel and Governor of the Fortress of Vieste on the Adriatic Sea. The other sons, Don Pietro Ignazio, Don Ferdinando and Don Francisco the Younger, also distinguished themselves in civil service and the military. Of the daughters, Donna Maria Giuseppa Carascon married Don Berlingiero Scoppa of Lucera, Donna Marianna Carascon married Colonel Don Orsino Scoppa of Lucera. Donna Concetta Carascon married Cavaliere Gaetano Pistorio of Messina. Don Francisco's older brother, Don Pietro Carrascon, was a Commissario Ordinatore (Chief Financial and Military officer in the Neapolitan Army) based in Naples and Orbetello during his career. Don Pietro and his wife, Donna Maria Teresa Remon, had three children: Don Gabriele, Don Pietro the younger and Donna Marianna. Donna Marianna married Don Giuseppe Fernandez d'Espinosa, brother in law of one of the leaders of the Parthenopean Republic, Gabriele Manthone. Don Francsico also had a sister, Donna Bernarda Carascon, who married the Governor of Pescara, Don Gioacchino (Joaquin) Fernandez d'Espinosa, father of the aforementioned Don Giuseppe and grandfather of Gabriele Manthone.

A descendant of Don Francisco also formed a pre-unification matrimonial alliance with the Bourbon royalist Criscuolo family of quartiere San Ferdinando, Naples.

== Sources ==
- Archivio di Stato di Napoli, Sezione Militare
- Archivo Historico Nacional, Madrid, Spain
- Fundacion Navarra Cultural, https://web.archive.org/web/20080905145146/http://www.fundacionnc.org/contenidocarrascon2.htm
