= Adam Norrie =

Scottish-American merchant (1796–1882)

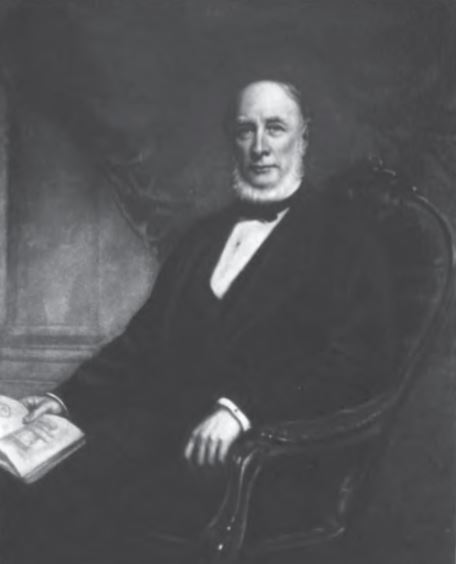

President of the Saint Andrew's Society of the State of New York
- In office 1851–1862
- Preceded by: Richard Irvin
- Succeeded by: Richard Irvin

Personal details
- Born: February 13, 1796 Montrose, Angus, Scotland
- Died: June 6, 1882 (aged 86) New York City, U.S.
- Spouse: Mary Johanna Van Horne (m. 1827; died 1873)
- Relations: A. Lanfear Norrie (grandson); Willoughby Norrie, 1st Baron Norrie (great-grandson)
- Children: 4
- Parent(s): John Norrie; Margaret Smith.

Adam Norrie (February 13, 1796 – June 6, 1882) was a Scottish-American iron merchant who was a founder of St. Luke's Hospital and who served as the president of the Saint Andrew's Society of the State of New York.

== Early life ==
Norrie was born on February 13, 1796, in Montrose, Angus, Scotland. He was a son of John Norrie and the former Margaret Smith. He received his education in Montrose.

== Career ==
At nineteen years old, Norrie went to Gottenburg, Sweden, where he spent nine years working for a large iron manufacturing firm. In 1823, he went to the United States as representative of the Swedish iron manufacturers to look into building up the iron trade between the two countries.

Once in the U.S. Norrie entered into a partnership with James Boorman and John Johnston, known as Boorman, Johnston & Co. to principally transact in Swedish iron. He was admitted as a partner in 1828. Their office was located on Greenwich near Cedar Street. After Boorman and Johnston died, Johnston's son, James Boorman Johnston, became Norrie's partner and they ran the firm from an office on Broadway and Wall Street (over the Bank of the Republic) until Norrie's retirement in 1875.

Norrie later became one of the original stockholders of the canal between Lake Michigan and Lake Superior and one of the largest stockholders of the Milwaukee, Lake Shore & Michigan Railroad. He also served as vice president of the Bank of Savings and a director of the Bank of Commerce from its inception. He was also a trustee of the Royal Insurance Company and served as the chairman of its Finance Committee.

He was also a founder of St. Luke's Hospital. Norrie joined the Saint Andrew's Society of the State of New York in 1827, qualifying as a life member in 1867. He served as Manager from 1838 to 1840, second vice-president from 1843 to 1851, and president from 1851 to 1862.

== Personal life ==
On May 16, 1827, Norrie was married to Mary Johanna Van Horne (1799–1873) at Trinity Church in Manhattan. Mary was a daughter of Garett Van Horne and Ann Margaret (née Clarkson) Van Horn. Together, Mary and Adam were the parents of:

- Ann Margaret Norrie (d. 1905), who married George Lewis Augustus Moke (1814–1875), a son of Dr. Charles Alexander Moke and Martha (née Masterston) Moke.
- Gordon Norrie (1830–1909), who married Emily Frances Lanfear, a daughter of Ambrose Lanfear.
- Mary Van Horn Norrie (1832–1888), who married David Plenderleath Sellar (1833–1901), son of Patrick Sellar.
- Julia Nickel Norrie (1839–1921), who married Warren Carpenter Beach (1844–1922) in 1883.

Norrie died on June 6, 1882, at 303 Fifth Avenue, his residence in New York City.

=== Descendants ===
Through his daughter Margaret, he was a grandfather of George Edward Moke Norrie (1858–1920) and great-grandfather of Charles Willoughby Moke Norrie, 1st Baron Norrie (1893–1977), who served as Governor of South Australia and Governor-General of New Zealand.

Through his son Gordon, he was a grandfather of Ambrose Lanfear Norrie (who married Ethel Lynde Barbey, a daughter of Mary Lorillard Barbey and granddaughter of tobacco magnate Pierre Lorillard III), Mary Lanfear Norrie, Dr. Van Horne Norrie, Sara Goodhue Norrie, Adam Gordon Norrie (who married Margaret Lewis Morgan, sister of Geraldine Livingston Morgan), Emily Lanfear Norrie, who died unmarried in 1936.

Through his daughter Mary, he was a grandfather of Norrie Sellar, a prominent cotton broker who married Sybil Katherine Sherman (the daughter of William Watts Sherman).
