= Sailing at the 1900 Summer Olympics – 1 to 2 ton =

1 to 2 Ton Sailing at the Games of the II Olympiad
- 1 - 2 Ton Class
- Venue: Meulan
- Date: First race: May 22, 1900; Second race: May 25, 1900
- Competitors: 22 (documented) from 3 nations
- Teams: 9

Medalists
1st place, gold medalist(s)		Hermann de Pourtalès, Hélène de Pourtalès, Bernard de Pourtalès	Switzerland
1st place, gold medalist(s)		Paul Wiesner, Georg Naue, Heinrich Peters, Ottokar Weise	Germany
2nd place, silver medalist(s)		François Vilamitjana, Auguste Albert, Albert Duval, Charles Hugo	France
2nd place, silver medalist(s)		Hermann de Pourtalès, Hélène de Pourtalès, Bernard de Pourtalès	Switzerland
3rd place, bronze medalist(s)		Jacques Baudrier, Lucien Baudrier, Dubosq, Édouard Mantois	France
3rd place, bronze medalist(s)		François Vilamitjana, Auguste Albert, Albert Duval, Charles Hugo	France

The 1 to 2 ton was a sailing event on the Sailing at the 1900 Summer Olympics program in Meulan. Nine boats started during the two races in the 1 to 2 ton. Twenty–two competitors from three countries are documented. The races were held on 22 and 25 May 1900 on the river Seine.

== Race schedule ==
●	Meulan competition	●	Le Havre competition

1900	May								August					
1900	20 Sun	21 Mon	22 Tue	23 Wed	24 Thu	25 Fri	26 Sat	27 Thu	1 Fri	2 Sat	3 Sun	4 Mon	5 Tue	6 Wed
1 to 2 ton			●			●								
Total gold medals			1			1								

== Course area and course configuration ==
For the 1 to 2 ton the 19 kilometres (10 nmi) course in the Meulan course area was used.

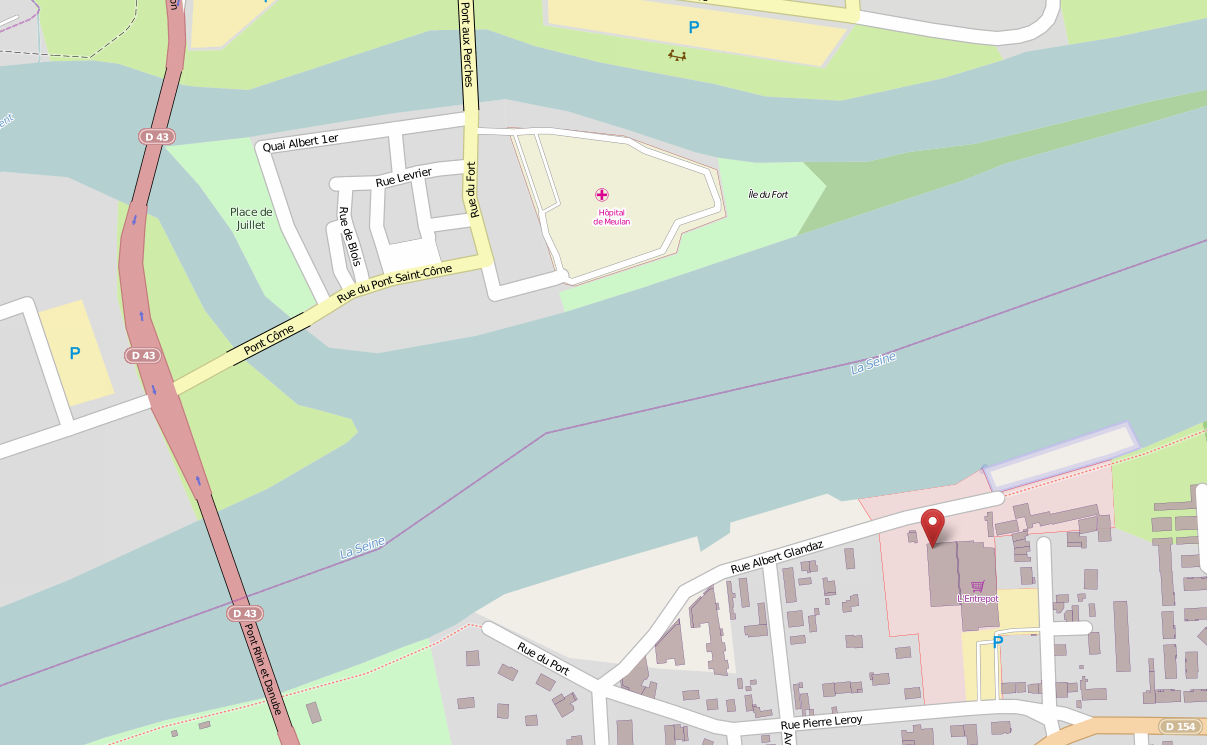
Course area Meulan

== Weather conditions ==
The race was troublesome due to an almost complete absence of any wind and that the wind there came perpendicular to the course (river Seine) and was blocked or diverted by trees and buildings.

== Final results ==
Two separate races were sailed. No combined results were made.

=== Race of 22 May 1900 ===
Rank	Country	Helmsman	Crew	Boat	Medalrace	
Rank	Country	Helmsman	Crew	Boat	Pos.	Pts.
1st place, gold medalist(s)	Switzerland	Hermann de Pourtalès	Hélène de Pourtalès; Bernard de Pourtalès	Lérina	1	02:15:32
2nd place, silver medalist(s)	France	François Vilamitjana	Auguste Albert; Albert Duval; Charles Hugo	Marthe	2	02:17:29
3rd place, bronze medalist(s)	France	Jacques Baudrier	Lucien Baudrier; Dubosq; Édouard Mantois	Nina-Claire	3	02:26:28
4	France	Eugène Laverne	Henri Laverne	Amulet	4	02:26:56
5	France	Marcel Moisand	Unknown	Ducky	5	02:31:14
6	France	Georges Warenhorst	Unknown	Freia	6	02:33:54
7	France	François Texier	Auguste Texier	Mamie	7	02:52:30
8	France	Lecointre	Unknown	Alcyon	8	03:05:06

Legend: DNC – Did not come to the starting area;
Gender: – male; – female;

=== Race of 25 May 1900 ===
This race saw with Aschenbrödel (German for Cinderella) one more boat competing. One day earlier they had entered in the ½—1 ton class, but were not permitted to race as their boat measured in at 1.041 tons. In this class the German crew sailed the lightest boat, yet easily finished in the quickest time. Their low handicap served only to widen the gap between them and the second-place Swiss team.

Rank	Country	Helmsman	Crew	Boat	Medalrace	
Rank	Country	Helmsman	Crew	Boat	Pos.	Pts.
1st place, gold medalist(s)	Germany	Paul Wiesner	Georg Naue; Heinrich Peters; Ottokar Weise	Aschenbrödel	1	03:09:19
2nd place, silver medalist(s)	Switzerland	Hermann de Pourtalès	Hélène de Pourtalès; Bernard de Pourtalès	Lérina	2	03:35:14
3rd place, bronze medalist(s)	France	François Vilamitjana	Auguste Albert; Albert Duval; Charles Hugo (sailor)	Marthe	3	03:37:49
4	France	Jacques Baudrier	Lucien Baudrier; Dubosq; Édouard Mantois	Nina-Claire	4	04:10:17
5	France	Georges Warenhorst	Unknown	Freia	5	04:11:22
6	France	François Texier	Auguste Texier	Mamie	6	04:30:08
7	France	Marcel Moisand	Unknown	Ducky	7	04:48:07
	France	Eugène Laverne	Henri Laverne	Amulet	DNF	
	France	Lecointre	Unknown	Alcyon	DNF	

Legend: DNF – Did not finish;
Gender: – male; – female;

== Notes ==
Since Hélène de Pourtalès was the first female Olympic starter in the modern Olympics, she holds the first Olympic medals won by a woman. However her Swiss team did not win the first medals for Switzerland, that honor goes to Louis Zutter during the 1896 Olympics.

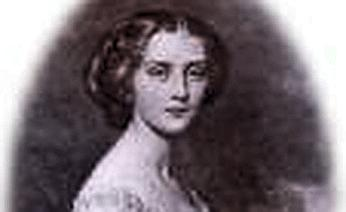
Hélène de Pourtalès

== Other information ==
Initially only the race on 22 May 1900 was part of the Olympic program. However the race on the 25 May 1900, initially part of the Exposition Universelle program, was afterwards awarded with an Olympic status.
