= Carascon =

Carascon is an Italian family name of hidalgo or noble Spanish origin. The surname was originally spelled Carrascón (In this form it is still found in Spain and Latin America). The surname was Italianized as Carascon in the early 19th Century. The founder of the Spanish House was Doctor Don Garcia Fernandez de Carrascón (ca 1480–1533), a wealthy Spanish cleric from Ágreda, Spain who was a protonotary apostolic and personal doctor to Pope Adrian VI as well as a canon of the Cathedral of Toledo, Spain. He left his fortune in the form of a mayorazgo or family trust to his nephew Don Pedro Carrascon and his descendants. Doctor Carrascon is buried in an elaborate chapel in the Church of San Miguel Arcangel in Ágreda.

The founder of the Italian branch of the family was Don Francisco Carrascón (1700–1756), a high-ranking military commissioner (Commissario di Guerra) of the Royal Spanish Army, and Senator of Messina, Sicily. Don Francisco was married to Donna Paula Diez, believed to be the sister of Don Antonio Filareto Diez e Palmero, a Sicilian Nobleman and Senator of Palermo in 1745 and 1764. Don Francisco and Donna Paula had four sons and three daughters. His eldest son, Don Bernabe (or Barnaba) Carrascon was a colonel in command of the Provincial Regiments of the Kingdom of Naples, and later Commandant of Lucera. His second son, Don Antonio Carrascon, was a Lieutenant Colonel and Governor of the Fortress of Vieste on the Adriatic Sea. The other two sons, Don Pietro Ignazio and Don Ferdinando also distinguished themselves in civil service and the military. Of the daughters, Donna Maria Giuseppa Carascon married Don Berlingiero Scoppa of Lucera, Donna Marianna Carascon married Colonel Don Orsino Scoppa of Lucera. Donna Maria Concetta Carascon married Cavaliere Gaetano Pistorio of Messina.

Don Bernabe's son, Don Francesco Carascon (1771–1820), married Donna Isabella Monarca, a noblewoman from Sessa Aurunca, daughter of Don Gennaro Monarca, Patrician of Sessa Aurunca and Donna Maria Grazia Pellegrini, Patrician of Capua. He eventually reached the rank of captain in the Neapolitan Army. His theatres of service included the Campaigns of Rome (1798) and Calabria (1806) under the armies of King Ferdinand I of the Two Sicilies, and after the arrival of Joseph Bonaparte, brother of Napoleon, he joined the Napoleonic Armed Forces, serving in Spain (1810–1811) in the Peninsular War under Joachim Murat, brother in law of Napoleon. After Napoleon's defeat at the Battle of Waterloo he once again served under King Ferdinand I of the Two Sicilies after the Bourbon Restoration in Naples. Don Francesco Carascon died in Messina during the peak of the Sicilian Revolution of 1820. His wife, Donna Isabella died five years later leaving behind seven children. Their youngest and only surviving son Alessandro Carascon (1814–1861), first became a Royal Gendarme and then moved to Sulmona in the Abruzzi and became a Caffettiere or Cafe-owner with the family of his new wife, Anna Maria Colaprete.

Don Bernabe's daughter, Donna Filomena Carrascon, married Colonel Don Dionisio Corsi, a Cavalry commander of the Regina Regiment and Governor (Intendant) of L'Aquila. All of their sons became military officers, but one in particular, Major Don Luigi Corsi, became distinguished as a pioneer in military incendiaries and steam locomotive technology. He was appointed Director of the locomotive factory, Officine di Pietrarsa near Naples by King Ferdinand II of the Two Sicilies.

Their descendants have lived in such varied places in Southern Italy as Messina, Naples, Vieste, Sessa Aurunca, Rome, Sulmona and Pacentro. It is a very rare surname, with only a few descendants in Italy, Spain, England, and the United States.

== Sources ==
- Archivio di Stato di Napoli, Sezione Militare
- Archivo Historico Nacional, Madrid, Spain
- Fundacion Navarra Cultural, https://web.archive.org/web/20080905145146/http://www.fundacionnc.org/contenidocarrascon2.htm
