= Wilhelm Heinrich Funk =

German-American painter (1866–1949)

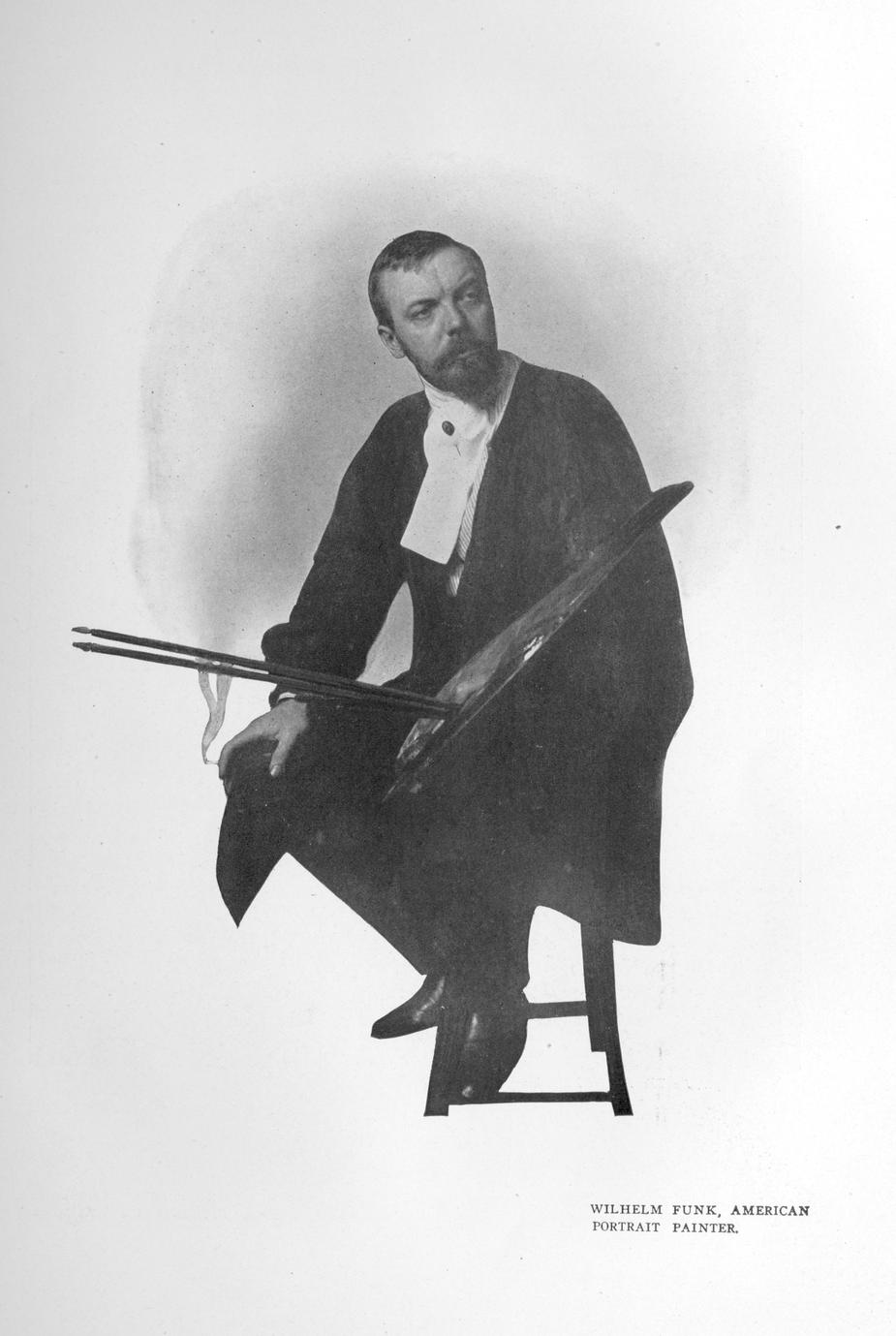
- Self-portrait in The Craftsman, May 1909
- Born: 14 January 1866; Hanover, Kingdom of Prussia, German Empire
- Died: 1949 (aged 82–83); Munich, West Germany
- Education: Academy of Fine Arts, Munich; Art Students League of New York
- Known for: Paintings
- Style: Portrait

Wilhelm Heinrich Funk (1866–1949) was a German-American portrait painter.

== Early life ==
Funk was born Hanover, Germany, on 14 January 1866. He was educated in the state schools of his native land, and came to the United States of America after his father's death in 1885.

He studied at the Art Students' League, New York City.

== Career ==
From 1891 to 1896, he was a pen and ink artist on staff of the New York Herald, also contributing to Scribner's, Century, Harper's, Judge, Truth and other magazines of the day. During this period he went to Europe every year and studied in the galleries of the Netherlands, Spain, Germany, Italy and France, especially the masters of the 16th century.

He then devoted attention to portrait painting, and painted portraits of several members of the royal families of Germany and Britain, and many well-known men and women in the United States and in France. He was an especial member of the Munich Academy of Fine Arts. Funk first attracted attention by a pen-portrait of the actor Edwin Booth.

== Gallery ==
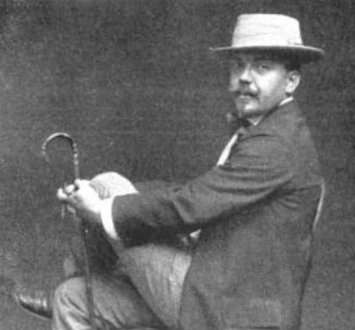
In The Sketch, 17 January 1900

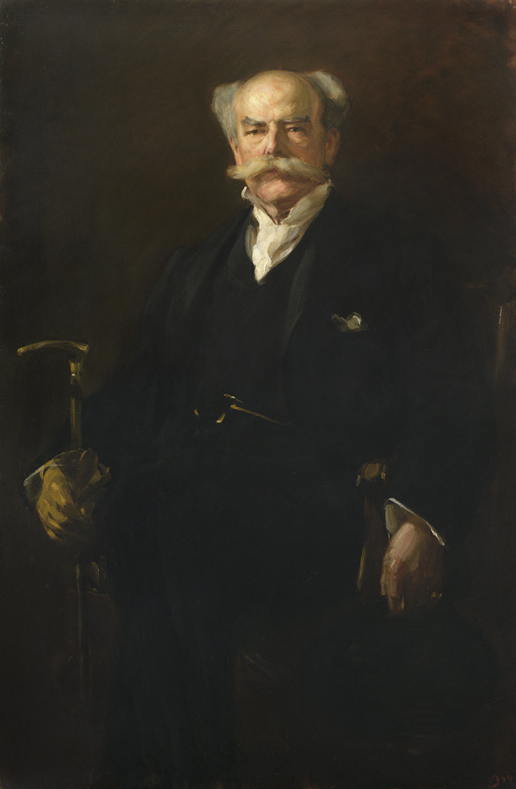
Portrait of Henry Isaac Barbey, by Funk, 1903

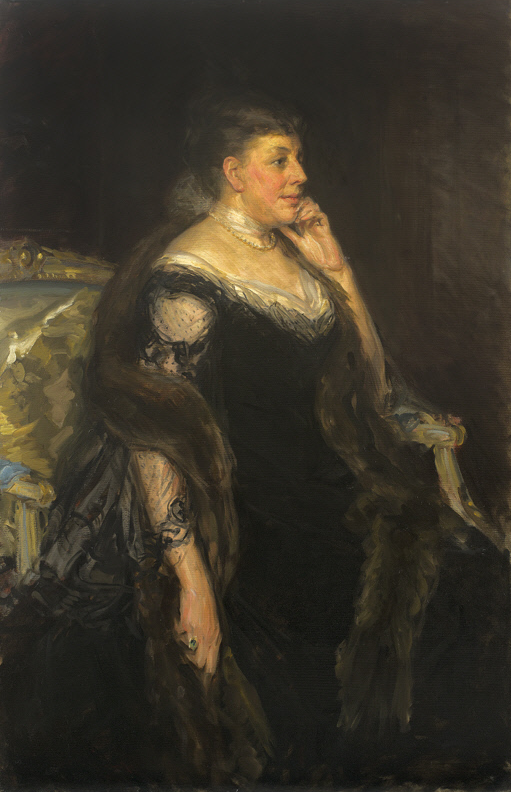
Portrait of Mary Lorillard Barbey, by Funk, 1904
