= Arab arch (Ágreda) =

- Puerta Árabe (Spanish)
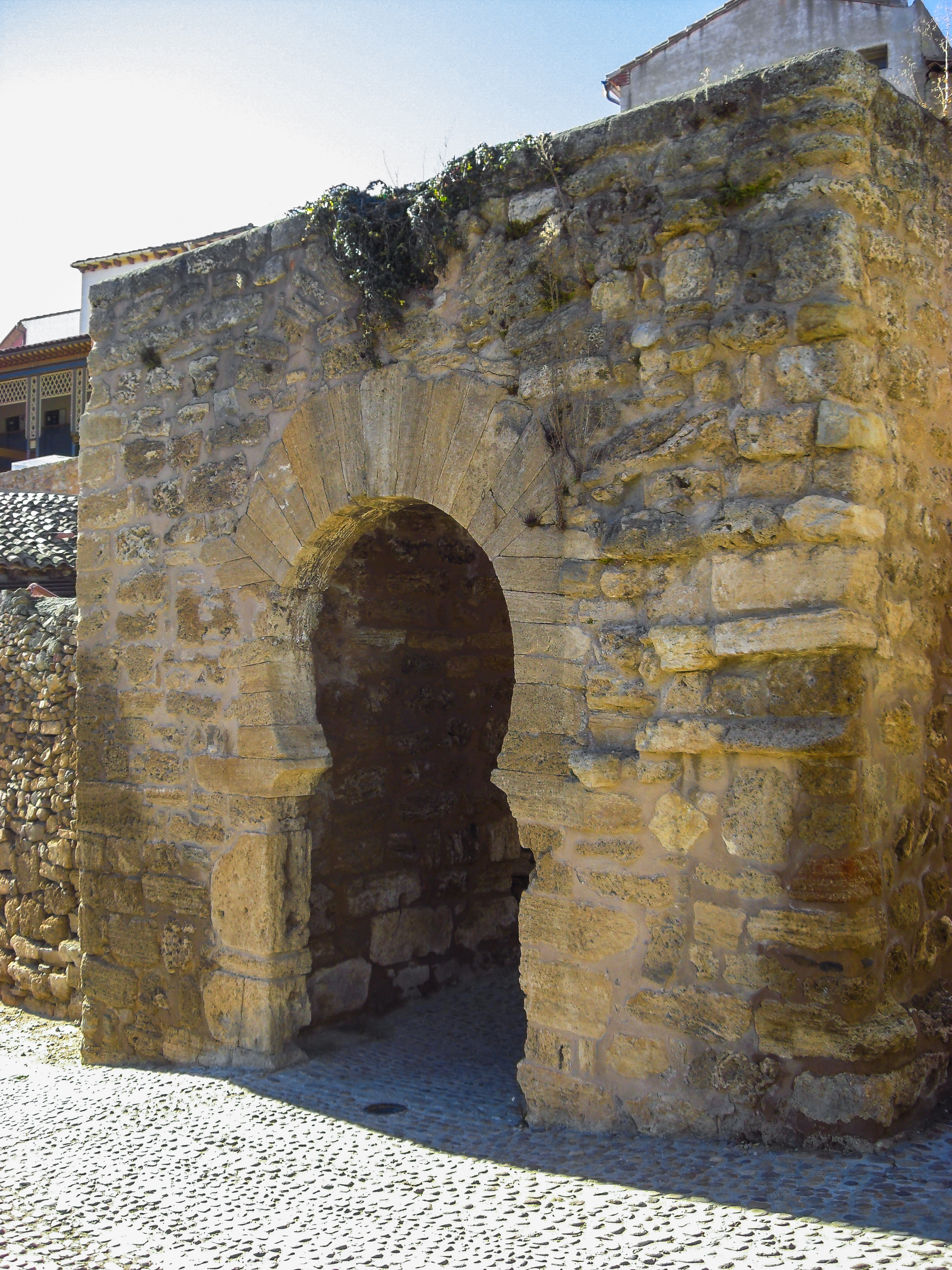

- Location within Spain
- 41.85472°N 1.916111°W
- Location: Ágreda, Spain

Spanish Cultural Heritage
- Official name: Puerta Árabe
- Type: Non-movable
- Criteria: Monument
- Designated: 1931
- Reference no.: RI-51-0000917

The Arab arch (Spanish: Puerta Árabe) is an arch located in Ágreda, Spain. It was built in horseshoe style. It was declared Bien de Interés Cultural in 1931.

== History ==
This arch is one of the only two surviving entries to medieval Ágreda. It was built in the 10th century, at the same time as the rest of the Arabic citywall, which originally had four gates.
