= Auguste Albert =

French sailor

Personal information
- Nationality: French
- Born: 29 April 1859 La Flèche
- Died: 16 October 1915 (aged 56)

Sailing career
- Sport: Sailing
- Class(es): 1 to 2 ton Open class
Competition record
Sailing
Representing France
Olympic Games
Silver medal – second place	1900 Paris	1–2 ton 1st race
Bronze medal – third place	1900 Paris	1–2 ton 2nd race

Auguste Albert (29 April 1859 – 16 October 1915) was a French sailor who competed in the 1900 Summer Olympics. He was a crew member of the French boat Martha 1, which won a silver and a bronze medal in the races of the 1 to 2 ton class. He also participated in the Open class with the boat Martha 27, but did not finish the race. He was born in La Flèche.
