= Édouard Mantois =

French sailor (1848–1900)

Personal information
- Nationality: French

Sailing career
- Sport: Sailing
- Classes: 1 to 2 ton Open class
Medal record
Sailing
Representing France
Olympic Games
Bronze medal – third place	1900 Paris	1 to 2 ton 1st race

Édouard Mantois (French pronunciation: [edwaʁ mɑ̃twa]) was a French sailor who competed in the 1900 Summer Olympics in Meulan, France. Mantois also took, as crew, the Bronze medal in the first race of the 1 to 2 ton and the 4th place in the second race of the 1 to 2 ton.
