= Albert Duval =

French sailor (1867–1942)

Personal information
- Nationality: French
- Born: 29 November 1867 Paris
- Died: 4 September 1933 (aged 65) Gouvieux

Sailing career
- Sport: Sailing
- Club: Yacht Club de France
- Class(es): 1 to 2 ton Open class
Competition record
Sailing
Representing France
Olympic Games
Silver medal – second place	1900 Paris	1 to 2 ton 1st race
Bronze medal – third place	1900 Paris	1 to 2 ton 2nd race

Albert Duval (29 November 1867 in Paris – 18 August 1942 in Gouvieux) was a French sailor who competed in the 1900 Summer Olympics.

He was a crew member of the French boat Martha 1, which won a silver and a bronze medal in the races of the 1 to 2 ton class. He also participated in the Open class with the boat Martha 27, but did not finish the race.
