= Henri Laverne =

French sailor

Personal information
- Full name: Louis Henri Laverne
- Born: 4 June 1868 Paris, Second French Empire
- Died: 30 December 1901 (aged 33) Sousse, French Tunisia

Sport

Sailing career
- Class(es): 1 to 2 ton Open class
Competition record
Sailing
Representing France
Olympic Games
Bronze medal – third place	1900 Paris	1 to 2 ton 1st race

Louis Henri Laverne (4 June 1868 – 30 December 1901) was a French sailor who competed in the 1900 Summer Olympics in Meulan, France.
