= Lady Charlotte Elliot =

Scottish poet

- Born: Hon. Charlotte Carnegie; 22 July 1839; Farnell, Angus
- Died: 15 January 1880 (aged 40)
- Spouses: Thomas Fotheringham (m. 1860; died 1864) Frederick Boileau Elliot (m. 1868)
- Children: Gilbert Compton Elliot
- Parent(s): Sir James Carnegie, 5th Baronet; Charlotte Lysons
- Relatives: James Carnegie, 9th Earl of Southesk (brother)

Lady Charlotte Elliot (22 July 1839 – 15 January 1880), born Charlotte Carnegie, was a Scottish poet born on 22 July 1839 in the parish of Farnell, Angus. Despair and abandonment are prominent in her three volumes.

== Early life ==
She was a daughter of Sir James Carnegie, 5th Baronet (1799–1849) and Charlotte Lysons. Her maternal grandfather was Reverend Daniel Lysons. Charlotte was thus a younger sister to James Carnegie, 9th Earl of Southesk. In 1855, Charlotte was raised to the social rank of an earl's daughter by royal warrant, which granting her the courtesy title of Lady.

== Poetry ==
A few years after the death of her first husband, she published her first volume of poetry, Stella, and other poems (1867), under the pseudonym "Florenz". The eponymous poem in the collection, "Stella", is set in the Italian Peninsula and features the doomed love of Count Marone and Stella. He is a man seeking Italian unification, she a daughter of the Neapolitan aristocracy, which is resisting this cause. Her early death causes her lover to seek the perils of the battlefield in an attempt to distract his mind. The subject matter is similar to Maud (1855) by Alfred, Lord Tennyson. Other poems in the collection seem to be focused on themes of "intense and painful experience". Examples are "Desolate", concerning the emotions of a person abandoned by a lover, and "The Prayer of the Penitent", dealing with experience of shame before God).

A decade after her second marriage, Charlotte published her second volume of poetry, Medusa, and other poems (1878), under her married name and dedicated to Frederick. The eponymous poem "Medusa" features the Medusa of Classical mythology, with whom it sympathises, noting the experiences of "days of despair" and "unspeakable woe" from the time of her transformation to her death at the hands of Perseus. The other poems in the collections are melancholic tales "on time, love and death".

A third volume of her poetry, Mary Magdalene and other poems (1880), was published posthumously. As she had requested, only fifty copies were printed.

== Personal life ==
In 1860, Charlotte married her first husband, Thomas Fotheringham. She was widowed in 1864.

In 1868, Charlotte married her second husband, Frederick Boileau Elliot, who was the fifth son of Admiral George Elliot and Eliza Cecilia Ness. His father was a younger brother of the 2nd Earl of Minto. Together, Lady Charlotte and Frederick were the parents of one surviving son:

- Gilbert Compton Elliot (1871–1931), who went on to serve in the Black Watch, reaching the rank of Lieutenant; he married American heiress Marguerite "Rita" Barbey (1876–1955), a daughter of Mary Lorillard Barbey and Henry Isaac Barbey.

Charlotte died on 15 January 1880. Her husband died on 23 December of the same year.

== List of works ==
- Stella, and other poems (1867).
- Medusa, and other poems (1878).
- Mary Magdalene and other poems (1880).
