= Dubosq =

French sailor

Personal information
- Nationality: French

Sailing career
- Sport: Sailing
- Class(es): 1 to 2 ton Open class
Medal record
Sailing
Representing France
Olympic Games
Bronze medal – third place	1900 Paris	1–2 ton 1st race

Dubosq was a French sailor who competed in the 1900 Summer Olympics in Meulan, France. Dubosq also took, as crew, the bronze medal in the first race of the 1 to 2 ton and the 4th place in the second race of the 1 to 2 ton.
