= Hélène de Pourtalès =

Swiss sailor (1868–1945)

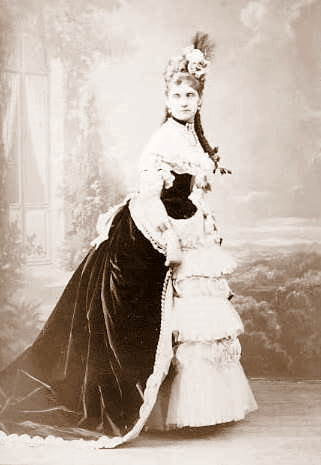
- Pourtales c. 1900

Personal information
- Nationality: Swiss
- Born: Helen Barbey; April 28, 1868 New York City, US
- Died: November 2, 1945 (aged 77) Geneva, Switzerland
- Spouse: Hermann Alexander, Count von Pourtalès (after 1888)

Sailing career
- Sport: Sailing
- Club: Union des Yachtsmen
- Classes: 1 to 2 ton; Open class
Medal record
Sailing
Representing Switzerland
Olympic Games
Gold medal – first place	1900 Paris	1 to 2 ton 1st race
Silver medal – second place	1900 Paris	1 to 2 ton 2nd race

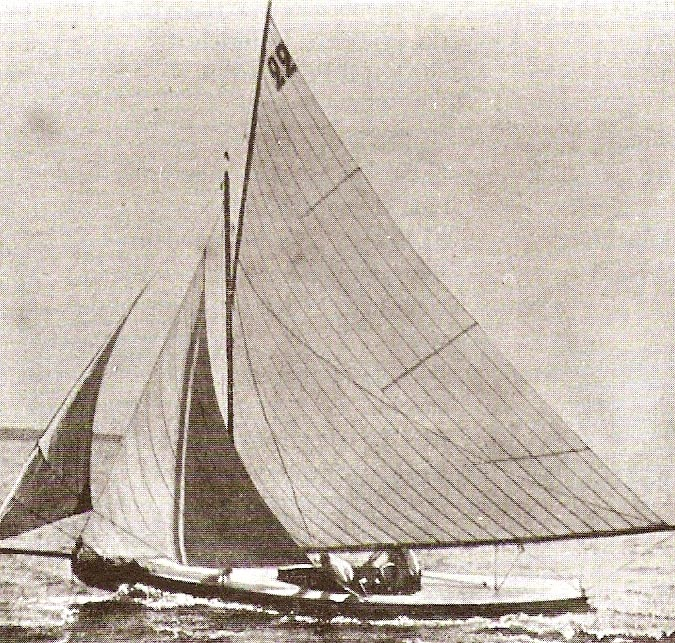
Swiss boat Lérina – 1900 Summer Olympics

Countess Hélène de Pourtalès (born Helen Barbey; April 28, 1868 – November 2, 1945) was an American-born Swiss sailor who competed in the 1900 Summer Olympics in Paris representing Switzerland and became the first woman to win an Olympic gold medal. She was also the first woman to represent Switzerland at the Olympics.

== Early life ==
Helen Barbey was born on April 28, 1868, in New York City, the daughter of Henry Isaac Barbey and Mary (née Lorillard) Barbey. Her maternal grandparents were Pierre Lorillard III and Catherine Anne (née Griswold) Lorillard. Her sister Eva was married to André Poupart, Baron de Neuflize in 1903, the older brother of Roberte Ponsonby, Countess of Bessborough. Her father, a financier and a director of the Buffalo, Rochester and Pittsburgh Railway, was a nephew of Adrian Georg Iselin and cousin of Charles Oliver Iselin.

Her family included her uncle Pierre Lorillard IV; aunt Catherine Lorillard; uncle George Lyndes Lorillard, who married Marie Louise La Farge, the daughter of John La Farge and the sister of Christopher Grant La Farge, who later became the Countess de Agreda after she married Count de Agreda; and Louis Lasher Lorillard, who married Katherine Livingston Beeckman, sister of Governor Robert Livingston Beeckman.

Barbey grew up at 17 West 38th Street in New York City.

== Career ==
De Pourtalès was a crewmember of the Swiss boat Lérina, which won the gold medal in the first race of 1–2 ton class and silver medal in the second race of 1–2 ton class. She also participated in the open class but did not finish. Her husband Hermann, as helmsman, and her husband's nephew Bernard were also crew members. De Pourtalès was also one of the first women to take part in the Olympics, as that was the first time women were allowed to compete. She was very well known after her gold medal, becoming the first woman to win a gold medal two months before tennis player Charlotte Cooper.

== Personal life ==
On April 25, 1891, de Pourtalès was married to Hermann Alexander, Count von Pourtalès (1847–1904), after the death of his first wife, Marguerite Marcet. Hermann was a captain of the Cuirassiers of the Guard.

From his first marriage, de Pourtalès became the stepmother of Count Guy de Pourtalès (1881–1941), the author, and Count Raimond Pourtalès (1882–1914), attache of the German embassy, who married Countess Luise Alexandra von Bernstorff (1888–1971), daughter of Johann Heinrich von Bernstorff, the German Ambassador to the United States in 1911. The wedding, which took place in Washington, D.C., was attended by William Howard Taft, who was then the president of the United States. After Raimond's death in 1914, his widow Luise Alexandra remarried to Prince Johannes Baptista of Löwenstein-Wertheim-Rosenberg (1880–1956), the youngest son of Charles, 6th Prince of Löwenstein-Wertheim-Rosenberg.

De Pourtalès died on November 2, 1945, in Geneva.
