= Bernard de Pourtalès =

Swiss sailor

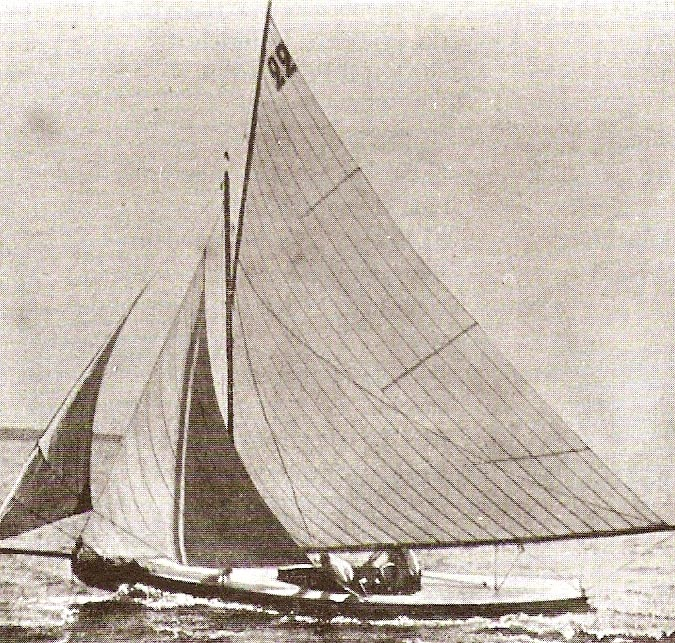
- The Lérina boat, gold and silver medal winner at the Olympic Games in 1900.

Personal information
- Full name: Bernard Alexandre Georges Edmond de Pourtalès
- Born: 5 June 1870 Bellevue, Switzerland
- Died: 6 July 1935 (aged 65) Casablanca, French Morocco

Sport

Sailing career
- Class(es): 1 to 2 ton Open class
- Club: SN Genève
Medal record
Sailing
Representing Switzerland
Olympic Games
Gold medal – first place	1900 Paris	1 to 2 ton 1st race
Silver medal – second place	1900 Paris	1 to 2 ton 2nd race

Bernard Alexandre George Edmond de Pourtalès (5 June 1870 – 5 July 1935) was a Swiss infantry captain and sailor who competed in the 1900 Summer Olympics.

In 1900 he was a member of the Swiss boat Lérina, which won the gold medal in the first race and silver medal in the second race of the 1 to 2 ton class. He also participated in the open class, but did not finish. His uncle Hermann and uncle's wife Hélène were also crew members.

He was born in Bellevue, Switzerland, and died in Casablanca, French Morocco.
