= Lucien Baudrier =

French sailor (1861–1930)

Personal information
- Nationality: French
- Born: Lucien Alexandre Baudrier; 13 December 1861 Paris, France
- Died: 22 October 1930 (aged 68) Ermont, France

Sailing career
- Sport: Sailing
- Class: 1 to 2 ton
Medal record
Sailing
Representing France
Olympic Games
| Bronze medal – third place | 1900 Paris | 1 — 2 ton 1st race |

Lucien Alexandre Baudrier (French pronunciation: [lysjɛ̃ bodʁije]; 13 December 1861 – 21 October 1930) was a French sailor who represented his country at the 1900 Summer Olympics in Meulan, France. Baudrier also took, as crew, the Bronze medal in the first race of the 1 to 2 ton and the 4th place in the second race of the 1 to 2 ton.

He was the cousin of fellow Olympian Jacques Baudrier.
