= Hermann de Pourtalès =

Swiss sailor (1847–1904)

Personal information
- Full name: Hermann Alexandre de Pourtalès
- Born: 31 March 1847 Neuchâtel, Switzerland
- Died: 28 November 1904 (aged 57) Geneva, Switzerland

Sport

Sailing career
- Class(es): 1 to 2 ton Open class
- Club: Union des Yachtsmen
Medal record
Sailing
Representing Switzerland
Olympic Games
Gold medal – first place	1900 Paris	1 to 2 ton 1st race
Silver medal – second place	1900 Paris	1 to 2 ton 2nd race

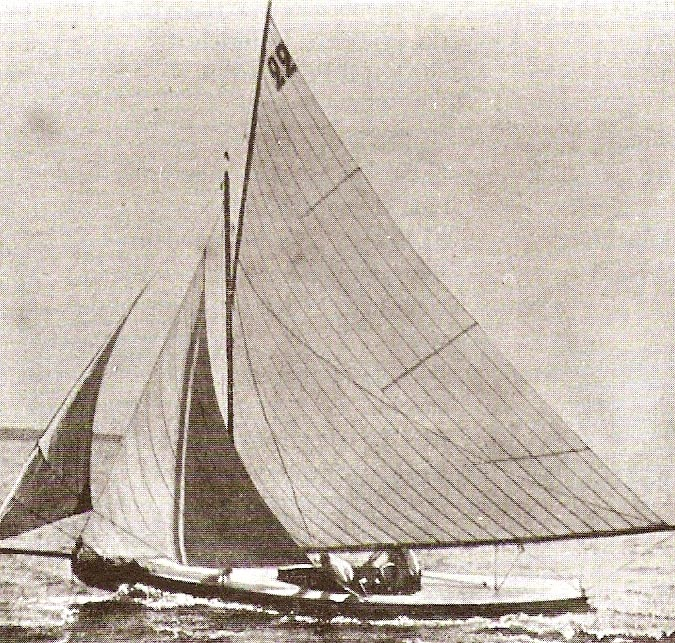
Lerina 1900.jpg

Count Hermann Alexander de Pourtalès (31 March 1847 – 28 November 1904) was a Swiss sailor who competed in the 1900 Summer Olympics.

== Early life ==
Pourtalès was born in Neuchâtel, Switzerland on 31 March 1847. He was a son of Count Alexandre Joseph de Pourtalès (1810–1833) and the former Auguste Saladin (1815–1885). His sister, Isabelle Marguerite de Pourtales, was the wife of archaeologist Henri Édouard Naville, a prominent Egyptologist who found a statue of Ramesses II at Bubastis.

His paternal grandparents were Louis de Pourtalès (a brother of James-Alexandre de Pourtalès and Frédéric de Pourtalès, grandfather of Friedrich von Pourtalès) and Sophie de Guy d'Audanger. His nephew was Bernard de Pourtalès. The Pourtalès family were French Huguenots who settled in Neuchâtel following the revocation of the Edict of Nantes in 1685. His maternal grandfather was Antoine Charles Guillaume Saladin.

== Career ==
Pourtalès was a captain of the Cuirassiers of the Guard, in the service of the King of Prussia Wilhelm I who later became the German Emperor.

=== Olympic career ===
He was a member of the Swiss boat Lérina, which won the gold medal in the first race of 1 — 2 ton and silver medal in the second race of 1 — 2 ton class. He also participated in the open class, but did not finish. His wife Hélène and nephew Bernard were crew members.

== Personal life ==
Pourtalès was married to Marguerite "Daisy" Marcet (1857–1888), a daughter of William Marcet, president of the Royal Meteorological Society. In 1887, the family returned to Switzerland, where they lived first at Malagny, near Versoix, in the Canton of Geneva. Together, they were the parents of:

- Count Guy de Pourtalès (1881–1941), an author who married Hélène Marcuard in 1911.
- Count Raimond Pourtalès (1882–1914), attache of the German embassy, who married Countess Luise Alexandra von Bernstorff (1888–1971), daughter of Johann Heinrich von Bernstorff, the German Ambassador to the United States in 1911. The wedding, which took place in Washington, D.C. was attended by William Howard Taft, who was then the President of the United States. After his death in 1914, she remarried to Prince Johannes Baptista of Löwenstein-Wertheim-Rosenberg (1880-1956), the youngest son of Charles, 6th Prince of Löwenstein-Wertheim-Rosenberg.
- Constance Catherine Henriette de Pourtalès (1884–1973), who married Jules Jean Alfred Frossard de Saugy.
- Augusta von Pourtalès (1886–1972), who married Otto von Mitzlaff, an officer in the Uhlans Guard.

After the death of his first wife in 1888, Pourtalès remarried to American heiress Helen Barbey in 1891. She was a daughter of Henry Isaac Barbey and Mary Lorillard Barbey and a granddaughter of Pierre Lorillard III Her sister Eva was married to André Poupart, Baron de Neuflize (son of Baron Jean de Neuflize the older brother of the Countess of Bessborough). After their marriage, they lived at Mies in the Canton de Vaud.

Count de Pourtalès died on 28 November 1904 in Geneva.
