= Charles H. Houghton =

American Civil War Medal of Honor recipient

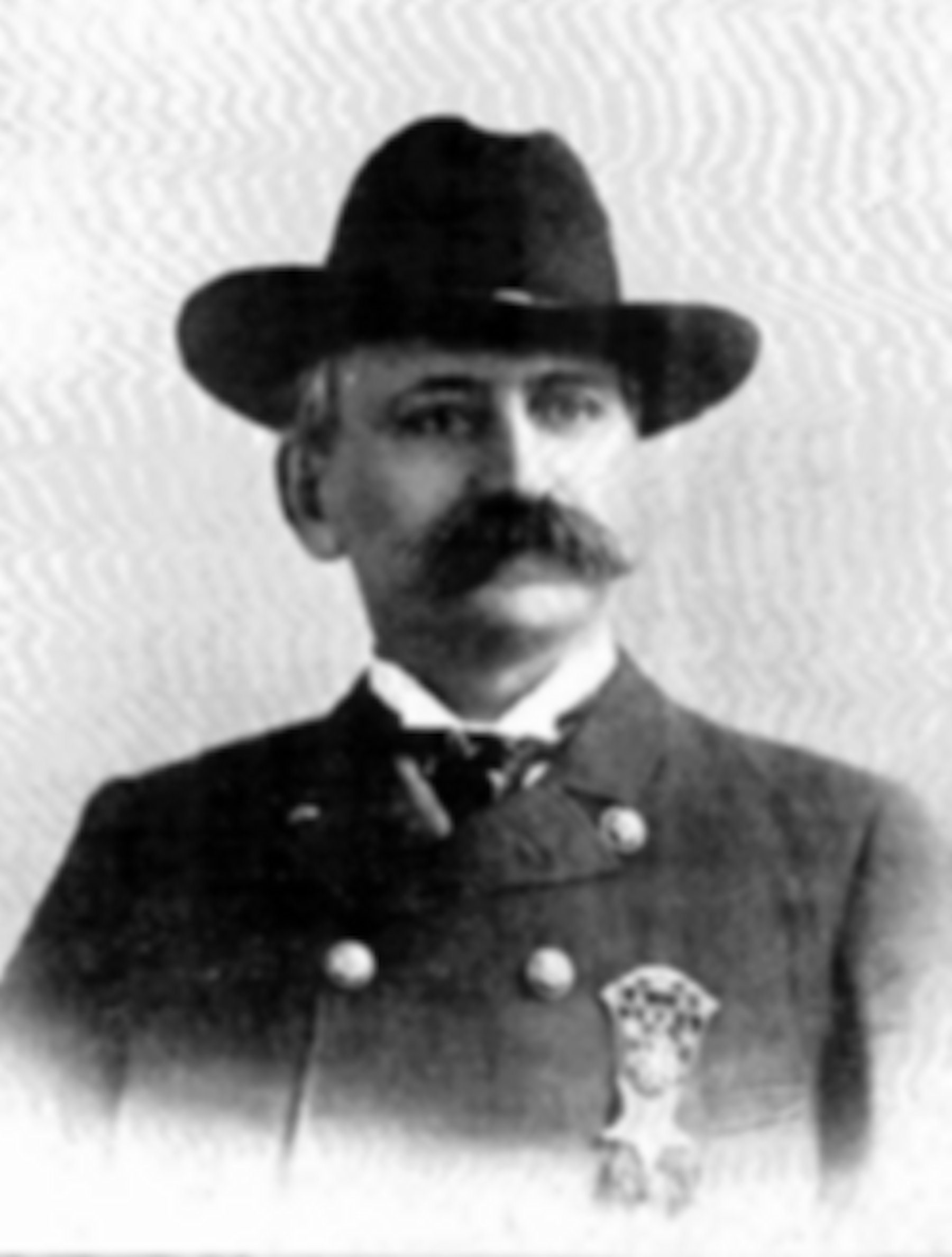
- Houghton in c. 1898
- Born: April 30, 1842; Macomb, New York, US
- Died: April 6, 1914 (aged 71)
- Burial place: Arlington National Cemetery
- Military career
- Allegiance: United States
- Branch: US Army
- Rank: Captain
- Units: Company L, 14th New York Artillery Regiment
- Conflicts: American Civil War
- Awards: Medal of Honor

Charles H. Houghton (April 30, 1842 – April 6, 1914) was a Union Army soldier in the American Civil War who received the U.S. military's highest decoration, the Medal of Honor.

== Biography ==
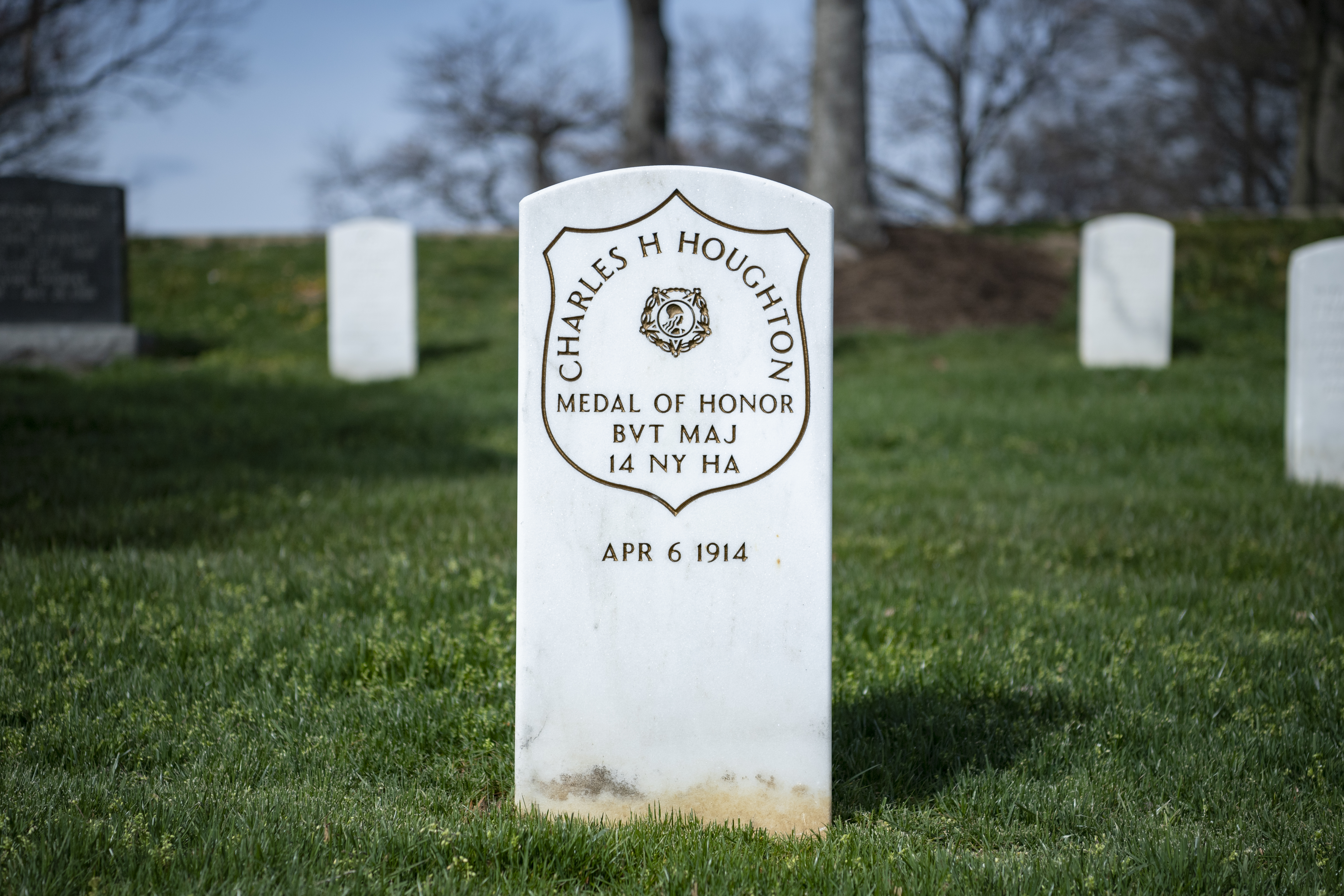
Grave at Arlington National Cemetery

Houghton was born in Macomb on April 30, 1842, and entered service at Odgensburg. He was awarded the Medal of Honor, for extraordinary heroism shown on July 30, 1864, and March 25, 1865, while serving as a captain with Company L, 14th New York Artillery Regiment, at Petersberg. His Medal of Honor was issued on April 5, 1898. On page 186 of the 4th Volume of Carl Sandburg's "Abraham Lincoln- The War Years", Sandburg writes: 'On one cot Lincoln saw Captain Charles H. Houghton of the 14th New York Heavy Artillery. In the retaking of Fort Stedman Houghton had received two wounds early in the action, and a third later, staying with his men till they had re-established their lines, then being carried to hospital, where on recommendation of his superior officers for valor he received promotion by the President to the rank of brevet major. He had lost much blood in the amputation of the left leg above the knee and a secondary hemorrhage of an artery, surgeons and nurses taking a special interest, working until daylight to stanch the flowing blood, the query going the rounds the next day among cot occupants: "How is Houghton? Will he pull through?" Twenty-two years old, six feet tall, with black hair, large black eyes, he had more than a touch of romance about him as he lay white-faced and calm, prepared for what the day might bring. Lincoln stooped, put a hand lightly on Houghton's forehead, bent lower and kissed his boy on the cheek. The surgeon demurred to Lincoln's request to see the amputated leg. The sight might be too shocking, he suggested to the President, who insisted, so the covers were thrown back. The President saw the bare, mutilated stump. He bent down low and shook as he sobbed to the boy: "You must live! Poor boy, you must live!" And the young brevet major's whispered answer was, "I intend to, sir." And Houghton did come through, remembering the President's last words to him: "God bless you, my boy." '

He died at the age of 71, on April 6, 1914, and was buried at Arlington National Cemetery in Arlington.

== Medal of Honor citation ==
The President of the United States of America, in the name of Congress, takes pleasure in presenting the Medal of Honor to Captain (Field Artillery) Charles H. Houghton, United States Army, for extraordinary heroism while serving with Company L, 14th New York Artillery at Petersburg and Fort Haskell, Virginia. In the Union assault at the Crater, 30 July 1864, and in the Confederate assault repelled at Fort Haskell 25 March 1865, Captain Hughton displayed most conspicuous gallantry and repeatedly exposed himself voluntarily to great danger, was three times wounded, and suffered loss of a leg.
