= Guy de Pourtalès =

Swiss writer (1881–1941)

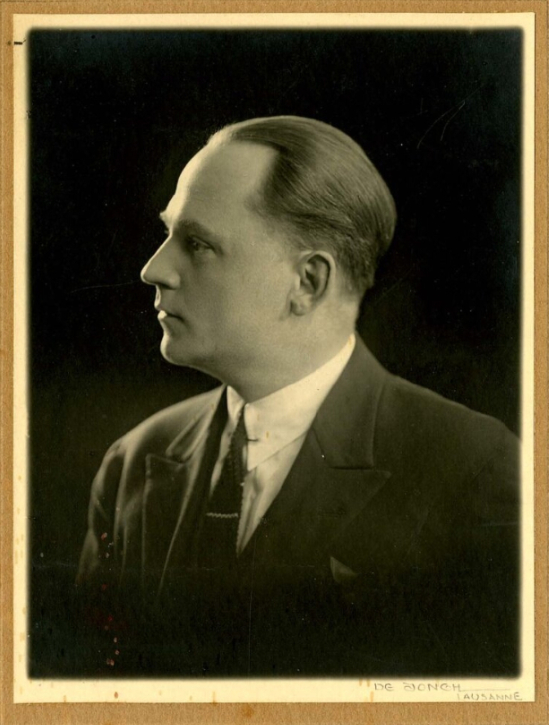
Pourtalès c. 1920

Guy de Pourtalès (Berlin, 4 August 1881 – Lausanne, 12 June 1941) was a Swiss author.

== Early life and education ==
He was the son of Hermann Alexander de Pourtalès (1847–1904) and his first wife, Marguerite "Daisy" Marcet (1857–1888). Guy was born in Berlin, where his father at that time was an officer in the service of the Prussian king Wilhelm I. When he was six years old, the family returned to Switzerland, where they lived first at Malagny near Versoix in the Canton of Geneva and then, after his father's second marriage (with Hélène Barbey) in 1891, at Mies in the Canton de Vaud. Pourtalès went to schools in Geneva and in Vevey and then to the gymnasium in Neuchâtel. After his matura in 1899, he studied in Germany. In Karlsruhe, he began to study Chemistry, which he abandoned soon in favor of musical studies, which he continued from 1902 to 1905 at the University of Bonn. In 1905, he moved to Paris, where he studied literature at the Sorbonne.

== Career as a writer ==
Pourtalès published his first novel in Paris in 1910. One year later, he married Hélène Marcuard, with whom he had three children, and in 1912, his French nationality was restored upon his demand, since his family were Huguenots who had fled from France to Neuchâtel after the revocation of the Edict of Nantes. Just before World War I, his second novel appeared.

In 1914, he was drafted into service in the French Army as a translator for the British troops in Flanders. At Ypres, he was gassed in 1915 and evacuated to Paris where he slowly recovered. He co-founded the Société littéraire de France, where he also published in 1917 his Deux contes de fées pour les grandes personnes ("Two fairy tales for grown-ups"). At the end of the war, he again served as a translator, this time for the American troops. After he was diagnosed with pulmonary tuberculosis in 1919, he rented the castle of Etoy in the Canton of Vaud in Switzerland in 1921 and henceforth would spend several months a year there. A large part of his literary work was written in Etoy.

From the 1920s on, Pourtalès published a series of romantic biographies of musicians and also wrote essays, critiques, and journalistic pieces for a variety of French magazines, amongst them the Nouvelle Revue Française. He also began to translate the works of Shakespeare in French, which raised the interest of Jacques Copeau. Pourtalès's translation of Measure for Measure was performed by the company of Georges Pitoëff in 1920 in Geneva and in Lausanne (with music by Arthur Honegger), and his translation of The Tempest was played by the company of Firmin Gémier in 1929 in Monte Carlo and at the Odéon theater in Paris.

In 1937, he published La Pêche miraculeuse, the novel for which he is best known today and which won him the Grand Prix du roman de l'Académie française.

Pourtalès's health had been slowly deteriorating, and when World War II broke out, he was severely ill and wouldn't leave Etoy anymore. His son Raymond (1914–1940), who served in the French Army, fell in combat on 28 May 1940. The death of his only son and the surrender of France seem to have weakened Pourtalès, who died at Lausanne on 12 June 1941.

== Works ==
- La Cendre et la flamme, Félix Juven, 1910
- Solitudes, Bernard Grasset, 1913
- À mes amis Suisses, Crès, 1916
- Deux contes de fées pour les grandes personnes, Paris, Société littéraire de France, 1917
- "Odet de La Noue, soldat et poète huguenot de la fin du XVIe siècle", Bulletin de la Société d'histoire du protestantisme français, 1918–1919
- Marins d'eau douce, Paris, Société littéraire de France, 1919
- La parabole des talents, 1923
- De Hamlet à Swann, essais de critique. Gallimard, 1924
- La vie de Franz Liszt, Gallimard, 1925
- Chopin ou le poète, Gallimard, 1926
- Montclar, Gallimard, 1926
- Louis II de Bavière ou Hamlet Roi, Gallimard, 1928
- Trilogie Shakespearienne, traduction de Hamlet, Mesure pour Mesure et la Tempête, Gallimard, 1929
- Nietzsche en Italie, Bernard Grasset, 1929. Translated by Will Stone as Nietzsche in Italy (Pushkin Press, 2022). ISBN 978-1-78227-728-6. Review
- Florentines, Gallimard, 1930
- Nous, a qui rien n'appartient, voyage au pays Kmer, Flammarion, 1931
- Wagner histoire d'un artiste, Gallimard, 1932
- La Pêche miraculeuse, Gallimard, 1937 - Grand Prix du roman de l'Académie française
- Berlioz et l'Europe romantique, Gallimard, 1939
- Les Contes du milieu du monde, Fribourg: Egloff, 1940
- Saints de pierre, Fribourg: Egloff, 1941 (posthumous)
- Chaque Mouche a son ombre, memoires, Gallimard, 1980
- Journal, diary, Gallimard, 1991

== Prizes ==
- Grand Prix du roman de l'Académie française 1937 for La Pêche miraculeuse

== Literature ==
- Rougemont, Denis de: Guy de Pourtalès: Exposition du Centenaire, Genève: Château de Penthes, 1981
- Fornerod, Françoise: Histoire d’un roman : "La pêche miraculeuse" de Guy de Pourtalès, Genève: Slatkine, 1985. ISBN 2-05-100717-9.
- Fornerod, Françoise: Guy de Pourtalès, pp. 473–490 in Francillon, R.: Histoire de la littérature en Suisse romande, Lausanne: Editions Payot, 1997. ISBN 2-601-03183-2.
- Delacrétaz, Anne-Lise: "Pourtalès, Guy de" in German, French and Italian in the online Historical Dictionary of Switzerland, 11 February 2005.
