= Ágreda =

- Municipality
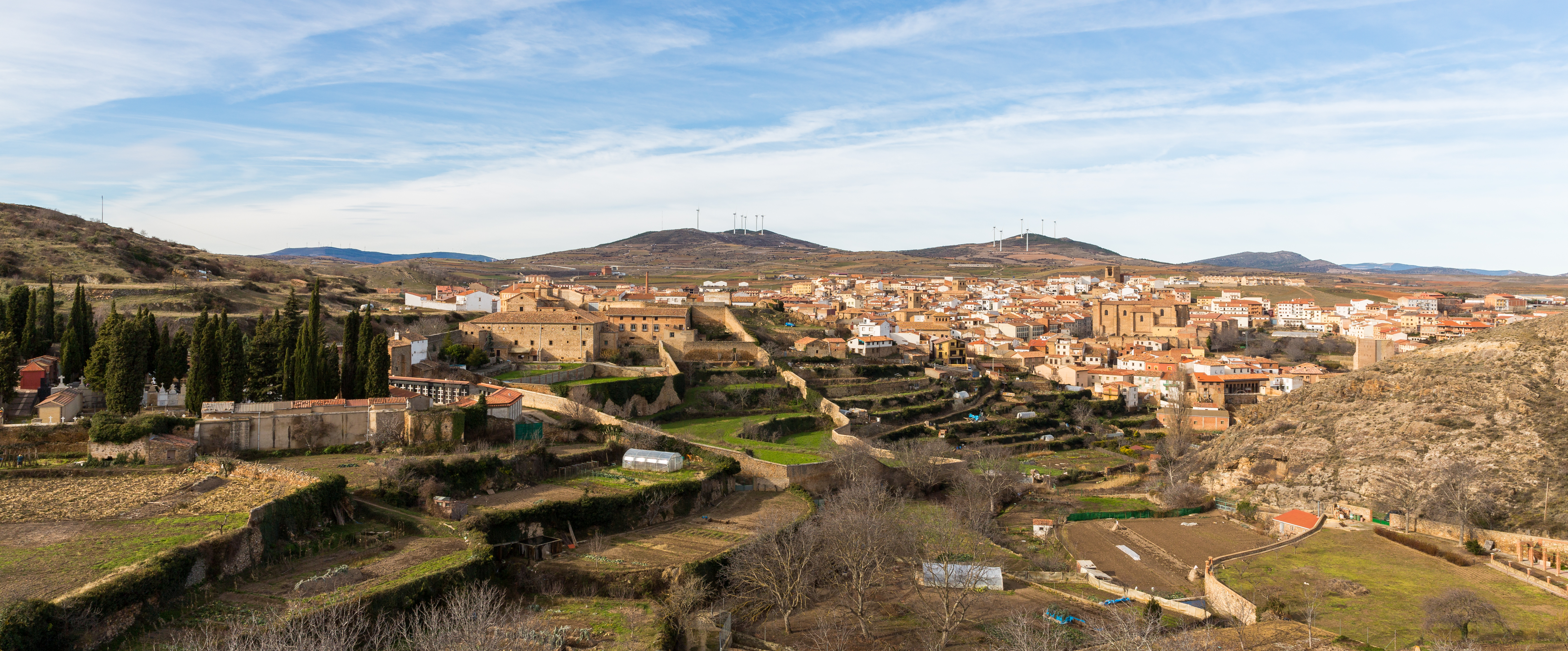
- View from the road to Vozmediano

- Flag Coat of arms
- Nickname: Ville of Agreda

- Location in Spain. Ágreda (Spain)
- Coordinates: 41°51′18.3″N 1°55′13.6″W
- Country: Spain
- Autonomous community: Castile and León
- Province: Soria
- Province: Ágreda

Area
  - Total: 164.93 km^{2} (63.68 sq mi)
- Elevation: 929 m (3,048 ft)

Population (2025-01-01)
  - Total: 3,133
  - Density: 19.00/km^{2} (49.20/sq mi)
- Time zone: UTC+1 (CET)
  - Summer (DST): UTC+2 (CEST)
- Postal code: 42100
- Area code: 34 (Spain) + 976 (Agreda)
- Website: Official website

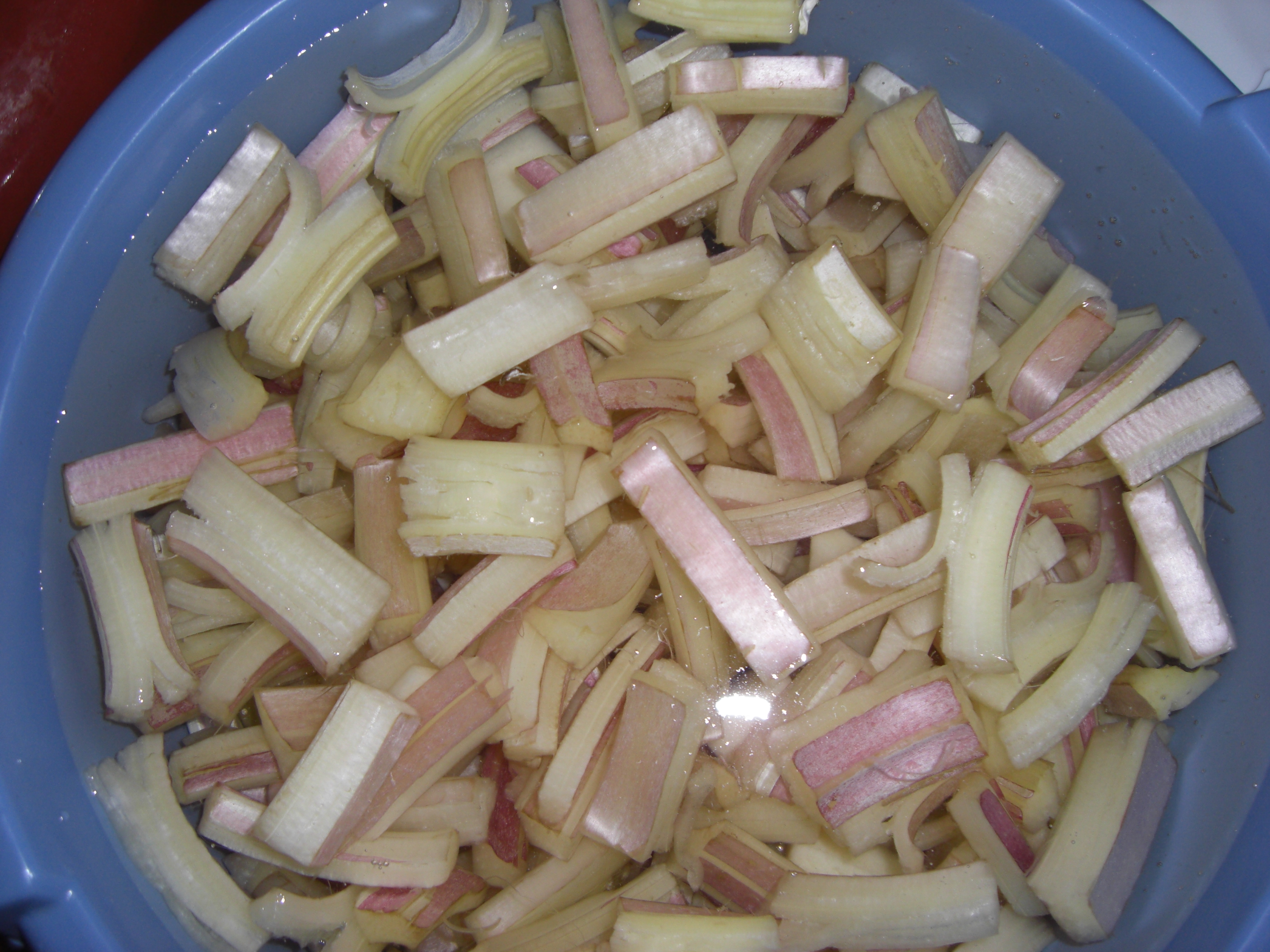
Ágreda is famous for its cardoons, here seen peeled and cut and ready for cooking.

Ágreda is a municipality located in the province of Soria, in the autonomous community of Castile and León, Spain.

Ágreda is the regional services center in the Northeast of the province of Soria. Its abundant heritage as well as the local fiestas of the Virgin, and the Archangel Michael attract many tourists.

== History ==
In the current location of the town there was an ancient Celtiberic settlement. During the Middle Ages Ágreda became more significant as a strategic border location between the kingdoms of Castile and Aragon, as well as an important center of the arts and handcrafts where Christians, Jews and Arab-descendants lived in peace. Ágreda is therefore known as the town of the three cultures.

The renowned abbess María de Jesús was born in Ágreda and resided there throughout her life. She was named a Venerable of the Roman Catholic Church shortly after her death in 1665, but has not yet been beatified or officially canonized as a saint. She was well known as a visionary of her times, and as a counselor to King Philip IV through a correspondence that lasted throughout each of their lifetimes and is documented in over six hundred letters between them. Over the years the king gave the abbess a few commemorative gifts which are on display today in the convent, yet there seems to be no undue favoritism to the region because of their friendship.

== Demography ==
Ágreda (Soria)
year	1900	1910	1920	1930	1940	1950	1960	1970	1980	1990	2000
Population	3,210	3,094	3,207	3,273	3,294	3,525	3,624	3,588	3,637	3,635	3,260

== Sightseeing ==
- Arab wall
- Arab district
- Arab arch
- Gate to the Arab district
- Gate of Alcázar
- Church of San Miguel, in the Gothic style of the 15th century with a Romanesque tower of the 12th century. It also has an impressive 16th-century altarpiece painted by Pedro Aponte and commissioned by Doctor Don Garcia Fernandez de Carrascón (ca 1480-1533), archpriest of Ágreda, protonotary apostolic, Treasurer of the Cathedral of Tarazona, personal doctor to Pope Adrian VI and canon of the Cathedral of Toledo, Spain. Doctor Carrascon's elaborate sarcophagus is in a side chapel on the left side of the Sanctuary.
- Church of Virgen de la Peña, Romanesque of the 12th century
- Basilica of Nuestra Señora de los Milagros, 16th century
- Monastery of La Concepción, founded in the 17th century by María de Jesús, where her body rests.
- Palace of los Castejones, 17th century
- Renaissance garden of Don Diego de Castejón.
- Museum of sacred art of Nuestra Señora de la Peña.
- The synagogue, ancient and small church of Romanesque style of the 12th century, built over an ancient synagogue.

== Economy ==
Agriculture, stock farming, industry (automotive and engineering), tourism, commerce and services

== Personalities ==
- Juan de Medrano, Moorish shoemaker in Ágreda, known for the extraordinary miracle that occurred on Corpus Christi day on 20 June 1527 involving a statue of Mary, known as the Virgin of Miracles in Ágreda, which led to his conversion
- Venerable María de Jesús, writer and nun
- Fermín Cacho, athlete

== Gallery ==
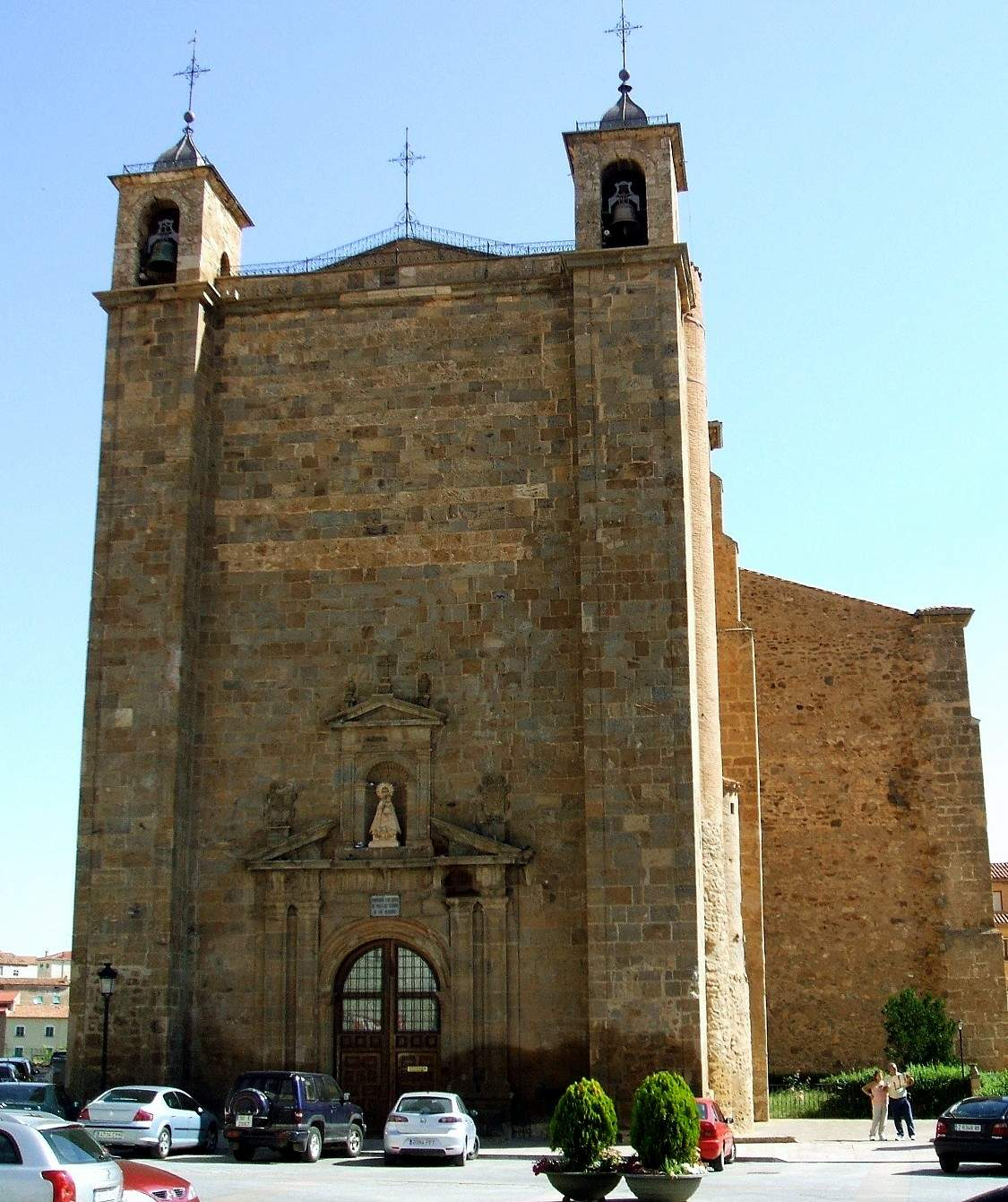
Basilica of Nuestra Señora de los Milagros.

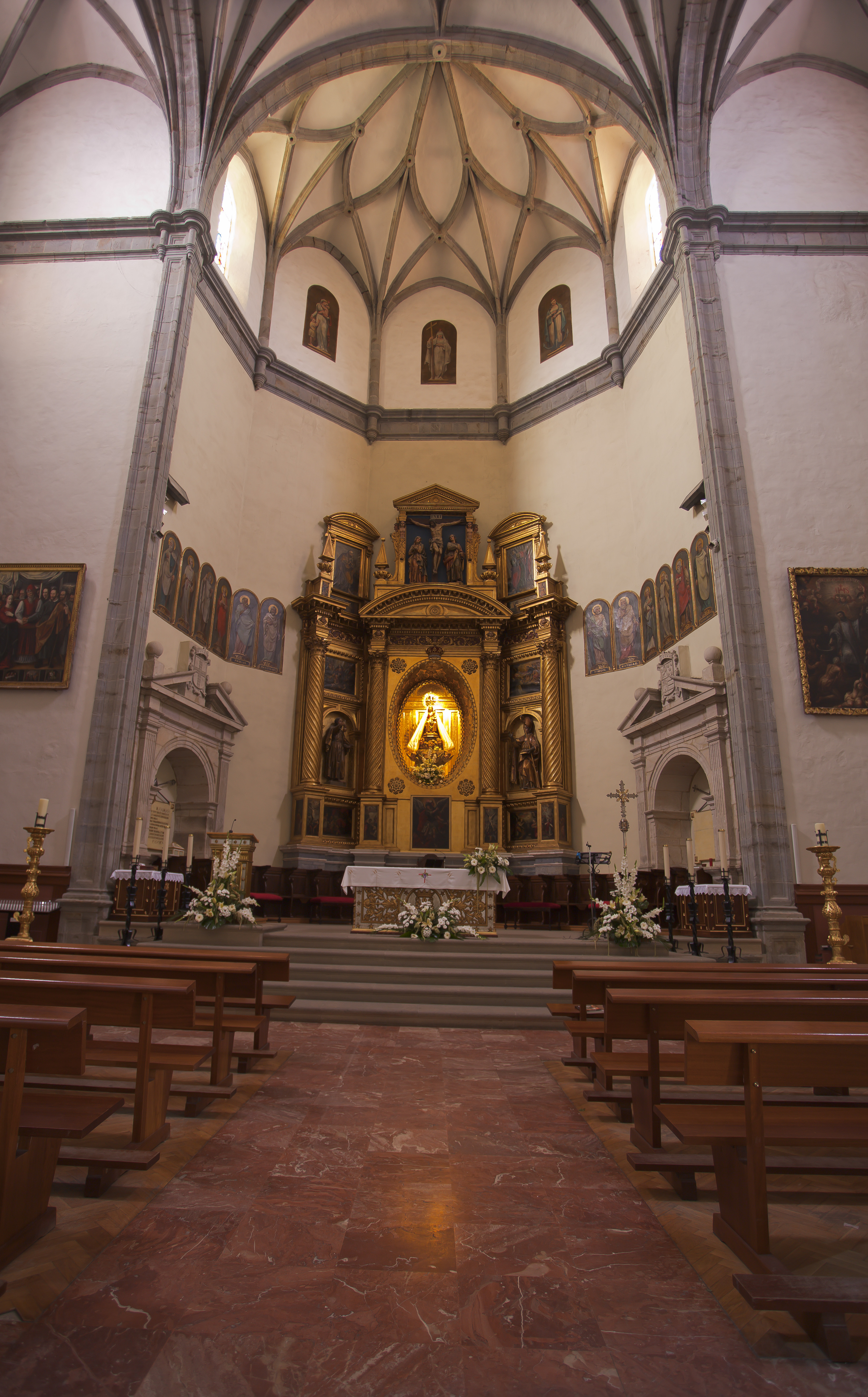
Interior of the basilica.

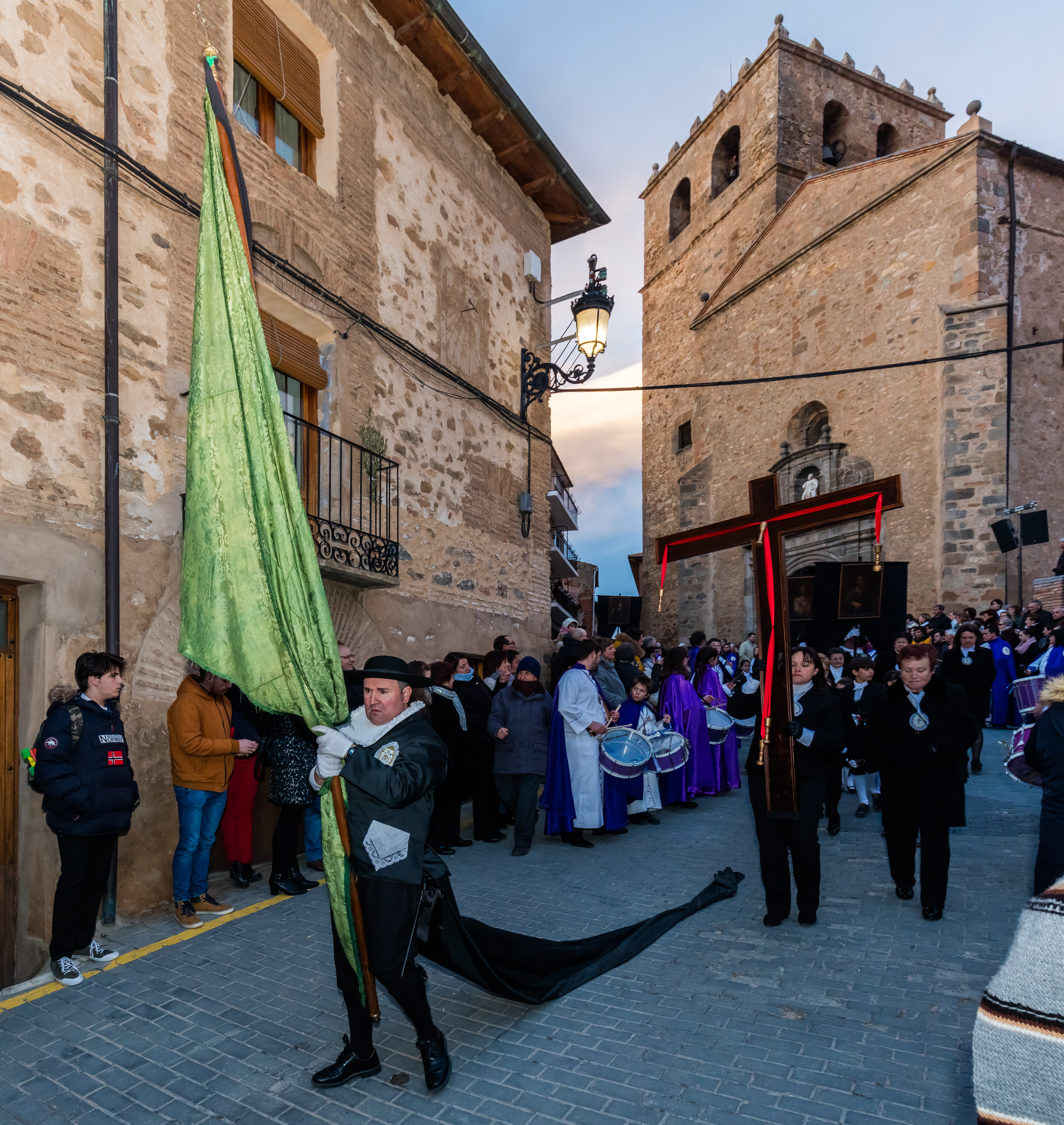
Holy week in Ágreda.

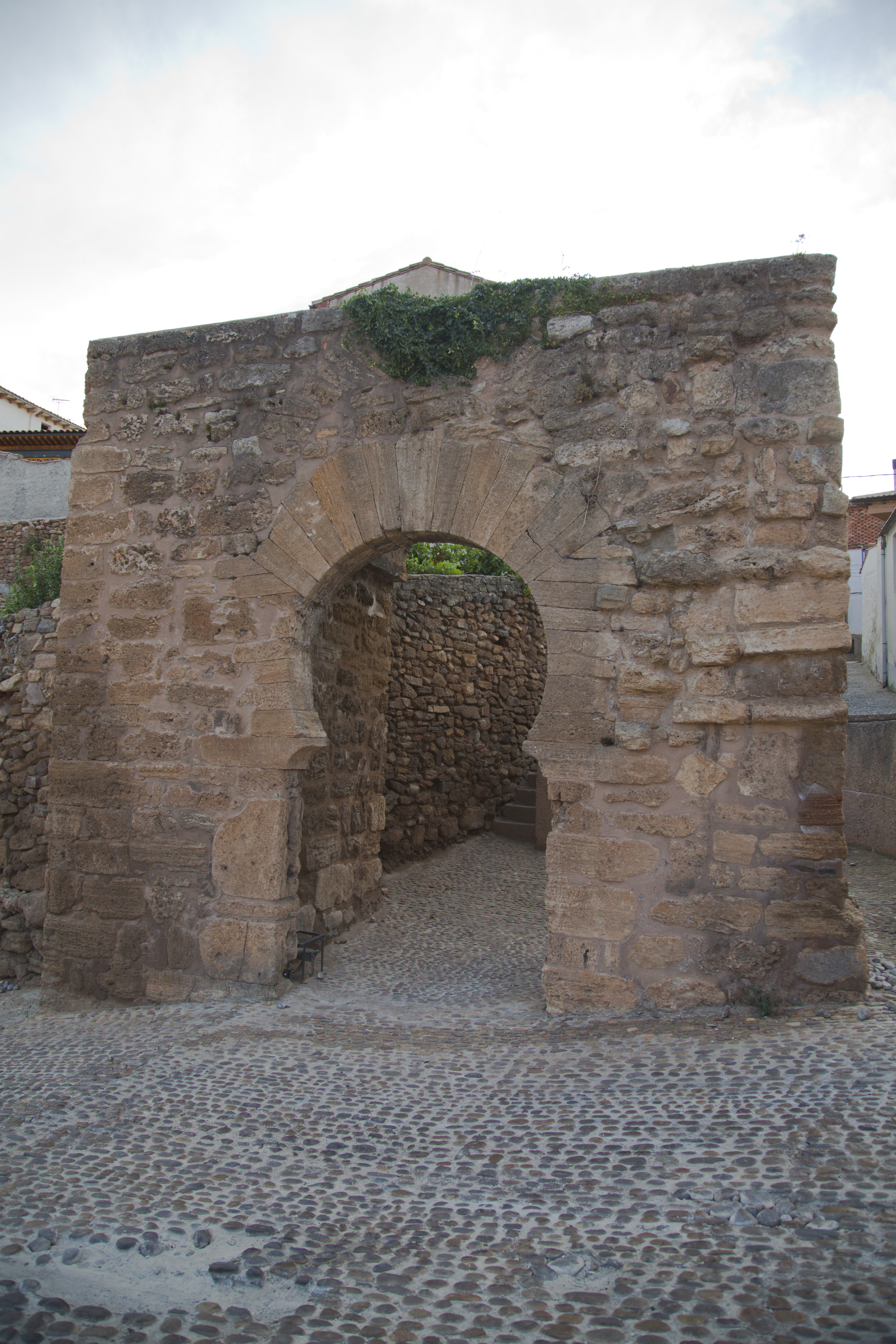
Arab arch.

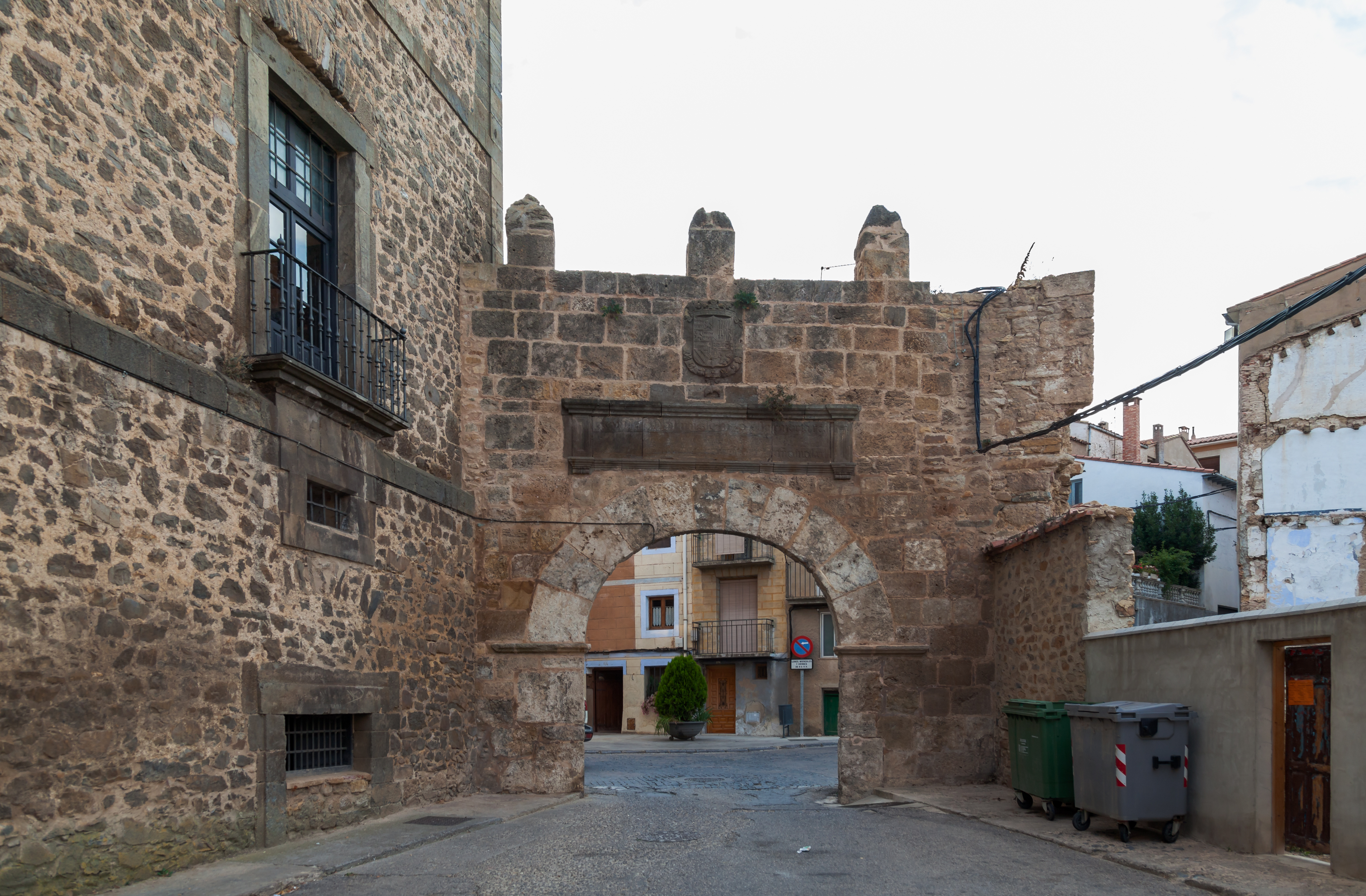
Gate of Philip II.

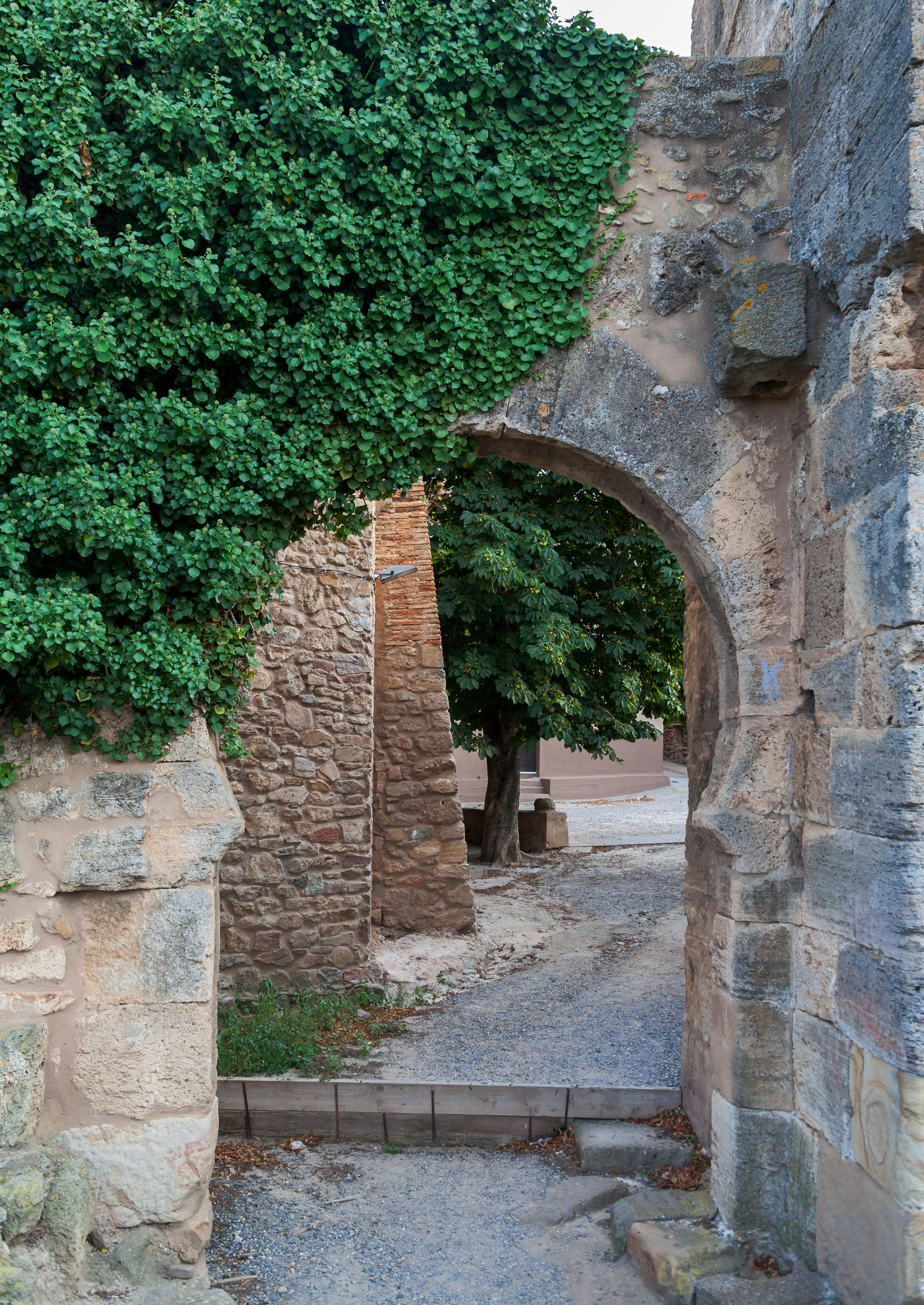
Gate in the Arab district.

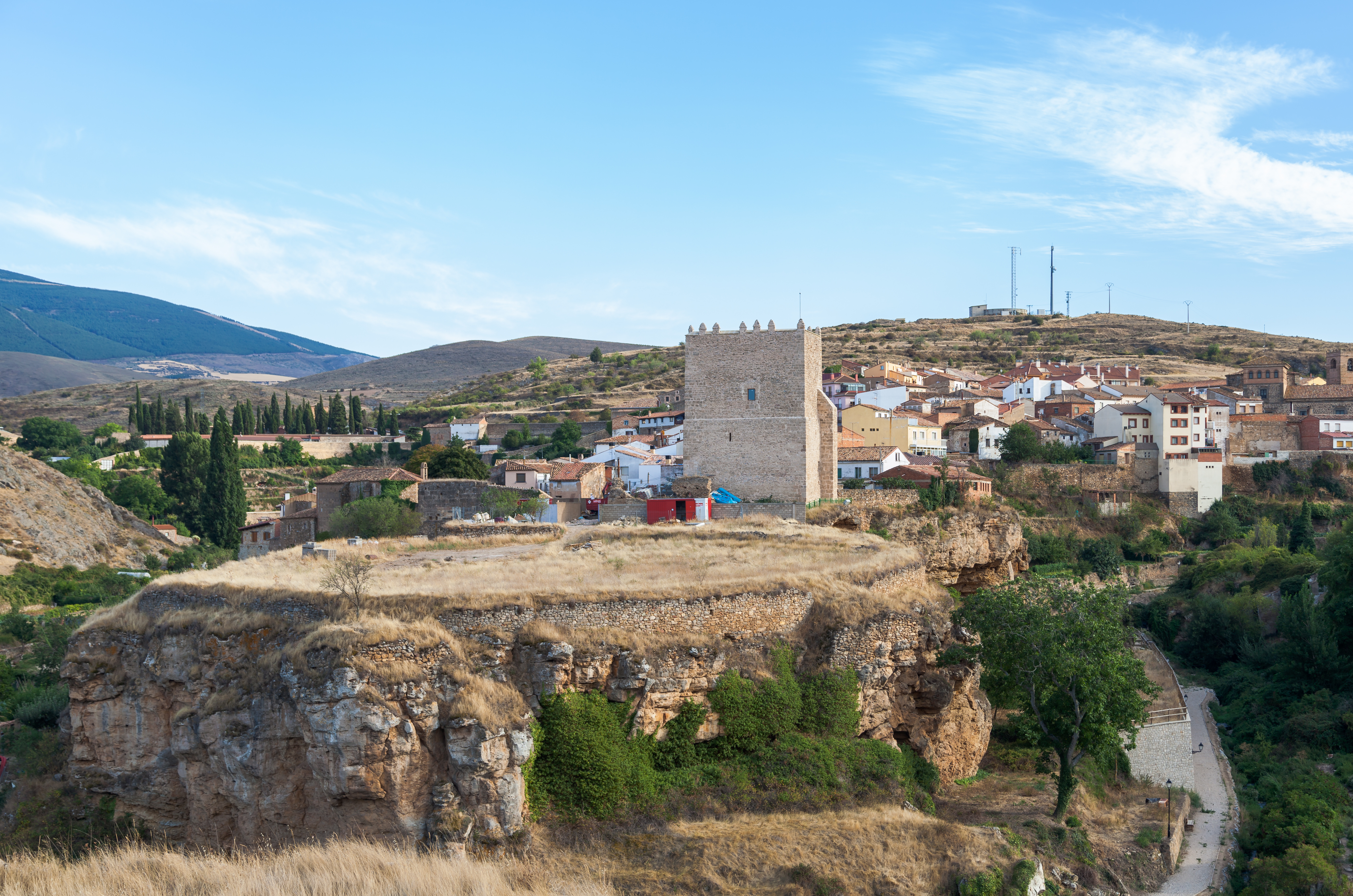
La Muela watch tower.
