= Points race at the Olympics =

Olympic sport

Points race at the Olympic Games
- Track cycling

Overview
- Sport: Cycling
- Gender: Men and women
- Years held: Men: 1900, 1984–2008; Women: 1996–2008

Reigning champion
- Men: Joan Llaneras (ESP)
- Women: Marianne Vos (NED)

The points race was a track cycling event held 8 times for men and 4 times for women at the Summer Olympics. The event was first held for men at the second modern Olympics in 1900. It was not held again until 1984; it was then held every Summer Olympics from then until 2008, after which it was removed from the programme. A women's version was introduced in 1996 and also lasted until 2008.

The points race was replaced with the Omnium, which includes a points race as one of its multiple components, in 2012.

== Medalists ==
=== Men ===
Games	Gold	Silver	Bronze
1900 Paris	Enrico Brusoni; Italy	Karl Duill; Germany	Louis Trousselier; France
1984 Los Angeles	Roger Ilegems; Belgium	Uwe Messerschmidt; West Germany	José Youshimatz; Mexico
1988 Seoul	Dan Frost; Denmark	Leo Peelen; Netherlands	Marat Ganeyev; Soviet Union
1992 Barcelona	Giovanni Lombardi; Italy	Léon van Bon; Netherlands	Cédric Mathy; Belgium
1996 Atlanta	Silvio Martinello; Italy	Brian Walton; Canada	Stuart O'Grady; Australia
2000 Sydney	Joan Llaneras; Spain	Milton Wynants; Uruguay	Aleksei Markov; Russia
2004 Athens	Mikhail Ignatiev; Russia	Joan Llaneras; Spain	Guido Fulst; Germany
2008 Beijing	Joan Llaneras; Spain	Roger Kluge; Germany	Chris Newton; Great Britain

==== Multiple medalists ====
Rank	Cyclist	Nation	Olympics	Gold	Silver	Bronze	Total
1	Joan Llaneras	Spain	2000–2008	2	1	0	3

==== Medalists by country ====
Rank	Nation	Gold	Silver	Bronze	Total
1	Italy	3	0	0	3
2	Spain	2	1	0	3
3	Belgium	1	0	1	2
3	Russia	1	0	1	2
5	Denmark	1	0	0	1
6	Germany	0	2	1	3
7	Netherlands	0	2	0	2
8	Canada	0	1	0	1
8	West Germany	0	1	0	1
8	Uruguay	0	1	0	1
11	Australia	0	0	1	1
11	France	0	0	1	1
11	Great Britain	0	0	1	1
11	Mexico	0	0	1	1
11	Soviet Union	0	0	1	1

=== Women ===
Games	Gold	Silver	Bronze
1996 Atlanta	Nathalie Lancien; France	Ingrid Haringa; Netherlands	Lucy Tyler-Sharman; Australia
2000 Sydney	Antonella Bellutti; Italy	Leontien Zijlaard; Netherlands	Olga Slyusareva; Russia
2004 Athens	Olga Slyusareva; Russia	Belem Guerrero; Mexico	María Luisa Calle; Colombia
2008 Beijing	Marianne Vos; Netherlands	Yoanka González; Cuba	Leire Olaberria; Spain

==== Medalists by country ====
Rank	Nation	Gold	Silver	Bronze	Total
1	Netherlands	1	2	0	3
2	Russia	1	0	1	2
3	France	1	0	0	1
3	Italy	1	0	0	1
5	Cuba	0	1	0	1
5	Mexico	0	1	0	1
7	Australia	0	0	1	1
7	Colombia	0	0	1	1
7	Spain	0	0	1	1
