= Italy at the 1900 Summer Olympics =

- IOC code: ITA

in Paris
- Competitors: 24 in 7 sports
- Medals Ranked 8th: Gold 3 Silver 2 Bronze 0 Total 5

Summer Olympics appearances (overview)
- 1896; 1900; 1904; 1908; 1912; 1920; 1924; 1928; 1932; 1936; 1948; 1952; 1956; 1960; 1964; 1968; 1972; 1976; 1980; 1984; 1988; 1992; 1996; 2000; 2004; 2008; 2012; 2016; 2020; 2024

Other related appearances
- 1906 Intercalated Games

Italy competed at the 1900 Summer Olympics in Paris, France.

== Medalists ==
Medalists

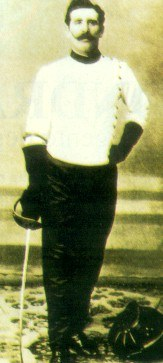
Antonio Conte

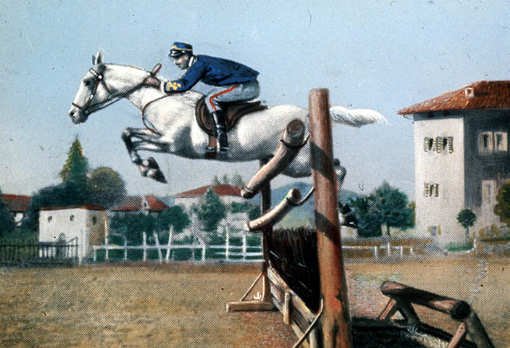
Gian Giorgio Trissino

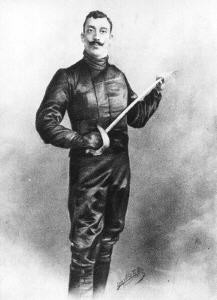
Italo Santelli

Medal	Name	Sport	Event
Gold	Enrico Brusoni	Cycling	Points Race
Gold	Antonio Conte	Fencing	Masters Sabre
Gold	Gian Giorgio Trissino	Equestrian	High jump
Silver	Italo Santelli	Fencing	Masters Sabre
Silver	Gian Giorgio Trissino	Equestrian	Long jump

== Results by event ==
=== Aquatics ===
==== Swimming ====
Italy had two swimmers compete in 1900, the nation's first appearance in the sport. Maioni and Bussetti each advanced to one event final, taking 6th and 7th place, respectively.

Swimmer	Event	Semifinals		Final	
Swimmer	Event	Result	Rank	Result	Rank
Paolo Bussetti	Men's 200 metre freestyle	3:35.0	5	Did not advance	
Fabio Maioni	Men's 4000 metre freestyle	1:25:16.6	1 Q	1:18:25.4	6
Paolo Bussetti	Men's 200 metre backstroke	4:09.2	4 q	3:45.0	7

=== Athletics ===
In Italy's first appearance on the athletics program, two Italian athletes entered three events. They did not advance to the finals in any event and won no medals.

Track events

Athlete	Event	Heat		Semifinal		Repechage		Final	
Athlete	Event	Result	Rank	Result	Rank	Result	Rank	Result	Rank
Umberto Colombo	100 m	Unknown	3	did not advance					
Umberto Colombo	400 m	Unknown	Unknown	did not advance					
Emilio Banfi	800 m	Unknown	Unknown	did not advance					

=== Cycling ===
Italy's first cycling appearance was at the second Olympic cycling competition, 1900. Seven cyclists from Italy competed in two events, winning a gold medal in the points race.

==== Track ====
Cyclist	Event	Round 1		Quarterfinals		Semifinals		Final	
Cyclist	Event	Result	Rank	Result	Rank	Result	Rank	Result	Rank
Romulo Bruni	Men's sprint	Unknown	4–8	Did not advance					
Enrico Brusoni	Men's sprint	Unknown	2 Q	Unknown	2	Did not advance			
Luigi Colombo	Men's sprint	Unknown	4–7	Did not advance					
Jacques Droëtti	Men's sprint	Unknown	4–8	Did not advance					
Antonio Restelli	Men's sprint	1:37.6	1 Q	1:52.4	1 Q	Unknown	2	Did not advance	
Giacomo Stratta	Men's sprint	Unknown	2 Q	Unknown	2	Did not advance			
Vianzino	Men's sprint	Unknown	4–8	Did not advance					

Cyclist	Event	Prime 1	Prime 2	Prime 3	Prime 4	Prime 5	Prime 6	Prime 7	Prime 8	Prime 9	Prime 10	Total	Rank
Enrico Brusoni	Men's points race	0	3	3	0	3	0	0	3	0	9	21	1st place, gold medalist(s)
Luigi Colombo	Men's points race	0	0	0	0	0	0	0	0	1	0	1	12
Giacomo Stratta	Men's points race	0	0	0	2	0	0	0	0	0	0	2	9

=== Equestrian ===
Italy had several competitors at the first Olympic equestrian events. The names of some or all of these are known. Trissino competed on multiple horses in the high jump. Elvira Guerra, Italy's first female Olympian, competed in the hacks and hunter combined.

Equestrian	Event	Time, height, or distance	Rank
Federico Caprilli (x2)	Jumping	Unknown	DNS
Ferdinand Po	Jumping	Unknown	DNS
Up to 3 unknown (Note: Other Italian competitors possibly included Uberto Visconti di Modrone and Gian Giorgio Trissino.)	Jumping	Unknown	4–37
Gian Giorgio Trissino	High jump	1.85	1st place, gold medalist(s)
Gian Giorgio Trissino	High jump	1.70	4
Gian Giorgio Trissino	High jump	Unknown	9–19
Up to 3 unknown (Note: Other Italian competitors possibly included Uberto Visconti di Modrone.)	High jump	Unknown	9–19
Uberto Visconti di Modrone	Long jump	Unknown	9–17
Gian Giorgio Trissino	Long jump	6.10	2nd place, silver medalist(s)
Elvira Guerra	Hacks and hunter combined	Unknown	5–51

=== Fencing ===
Italy first competed in fencing at the Olympics in the sport's second appearance. The nation sent 12 fencers, winning the top two places in the masters sabre event.

Fencer	Event	Round 1		Quarterfinals		Repechage		Semifinals		Final	
Fencer	Event	Result	Rank	Result	Rank	Result	Rank	Result	Rank	Result	Rank
Olivier Collarini	Men's foil	Advanced		Not advanced		Did not advance					
Giunio Fedreghini	Men's foil	Not advanced		Did not advance							
Giuseppe Giurato	Men's foil	Not advanced		Did not advance							
Palardi	Men's foil	Not advanced		Did not advance							
Olivier Collarini	Men's épée	Unknown	3–6	Did not advance		—N/a		Did not advance			
Giunio Fedreghini	Men's épée	Unknown	3–7	Did not advance		—N/a		Did not advance			
Giuseppe Giurato	Men's épée	Unknown	1 Q	Unknown	4–6	—N/a		Did not advance			
Giunio Fedreghini	Men's sabre	Unknown	1–4 Q	—N/a				Unknown	5–8	Did not advance	
Stagliano	Men's sabre	Unknown	5 q (Note: Stagliano advanced as an alternate to the semifinals when Dutertre withdrew.)	—N/a				Unknown	5–8	Did not advance	
Antonio Conte	Men's masters foil	Advanced		Advanced		Bye		5–2	3 Q	4–3	4
Italo Santelli	Men's masters foil	Advanced		Advanced		Bye		4–3	4 Q	0–7	7
2 unknown competitors	Men's masters épée	Unknown	3–6	—N/a				Did not advance			
Antonio Conte	Men's masters sabre	Unknown	1–4 Q	—N/a				6–1	1 Q	7–0	1st place, gold medalist(s)
Italo Santelli	Men's masters sabre	Unknown	1–4 Q	—N/a				6–1	1 Q	6–1	2nd place, silver medalist(s)
Orazio Santelli	Men's masters sabre	Unknown	1–4 Q	—N/a				3–4	8	Did not advance	

=== Gymnastics ===
Italy's first appearance in Olympic gymnastics competition was at the second gymnastics tournament, in 1900. The one Italian gymnast won no medals in a heavily France-dominated single event.

Gymnast	Event	Score	Rank
Camillo Pavanello	Men's all-around	255	28

=== Rowing ===
Italy had one rower compete in 1900.

Boat	Event	Round 1		Semifinals		Final	
Boat	Event	Result	Rank	Result	Rank	Result	Rank
Maxime Piaggio	Men's single sculls	DNF	—	Did not advance			
