= Cycling at the 1900 Summer Olympics – Men's points race =

Cycling at the Olympics

Men's points race at the Games of the II Olympiad
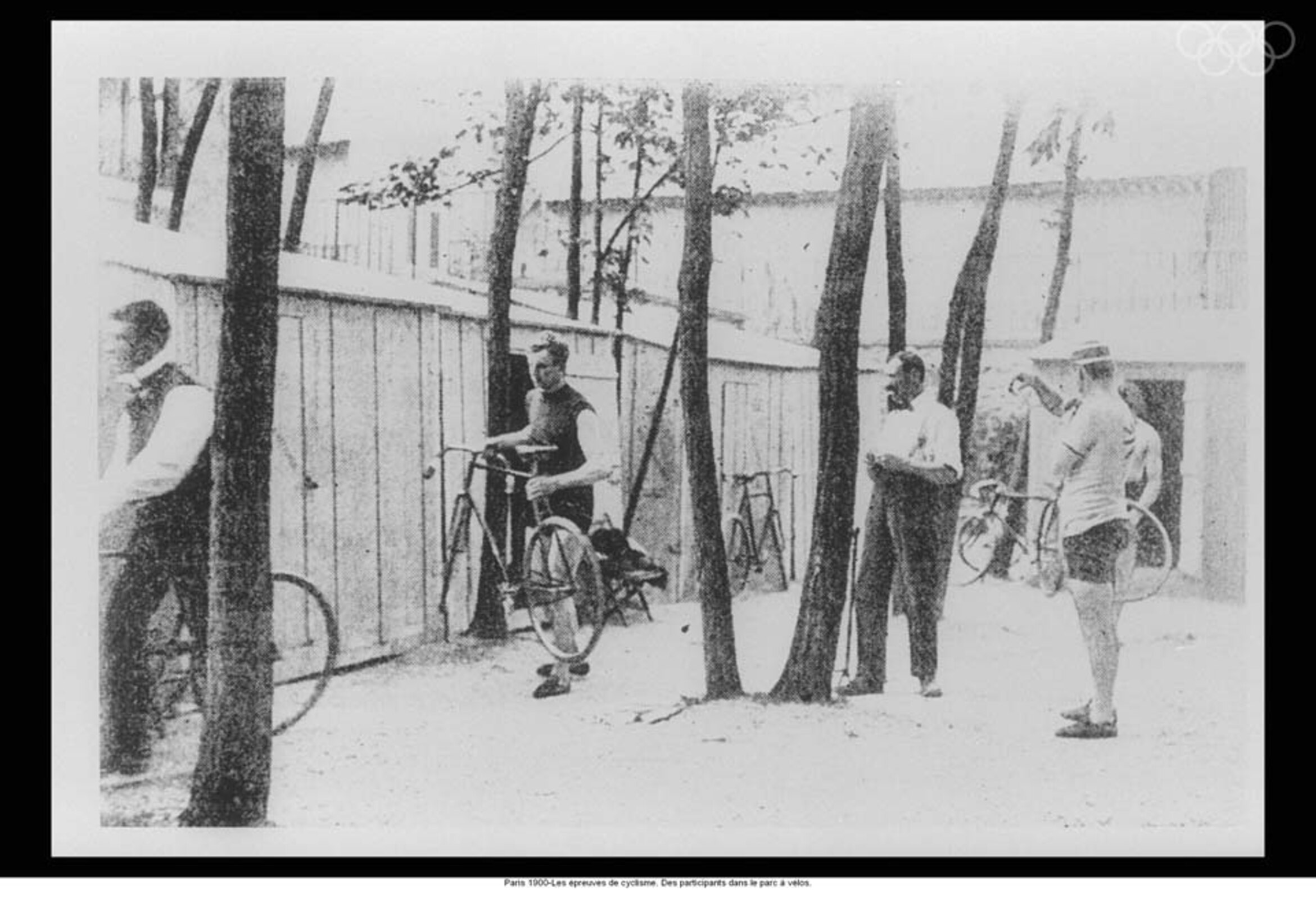
- Cyclists in the bicycle enclosure
- Venue: Vélodrome de Vincennes
- Date: September 15
- Competitors: 13 from 3 nations
- Winning score: 21

Medalists
1st place, gold medalist(s)		Enrico Brusoni; Italy
2nd place, silver medalist(s)		Karl Duill; Germany
3rd place, bronze medalist(s)		Louis Trousselier; France

The men's points race, or “Course de Primes,” was a track cycling event at the 1900 Summer Olympics. The competition was held on 15 September 1900 at the Vélodrome de Vincennes. There were 13 competitors from 3 nations. The event was won by Enrico Brusoni of Italy, who won 5 of the laps including the last one. Karl Duill of Germany placed second, with Louis Trousselier of France third.

== Background ==
This was the first appearance of the event. It would not be held again until 1984; after that, it was held every Summer Games until 2008 when it was removed from the programme. The women's version was held from 1996 through 2008.

== Competition format ==
The competition was broadly similar to the modern points race, but with significant differences. The event was 5 kilometres in length, with points awarded at each lap (prime) to the first three cyclists to finish the lap: 3 to the first to finish the lap, 2 to the second, and 1 to the third. The cyclist with the most points was the victor. On the last lap, the points were tripled: 9 to the winner of the race, 6 to second place, and 3 to third place.

A single race was held, with all cyclists starting together.

== Schedule ==
Date	Time	Round
Saturday, 15 September 1900		Final

== Results ==
The event was held on 15 September. Ferdinand Vasserot won the first lap, but failed to gain more than 1 more point the rest of the way. Enrico Brusoni won the second and third laps to move into the lead with 6 points, with Louis Trousselier behind him on both of those laps for 4 points and second place. J. Bérard was the fourth-lap winner, moving between Brusoni and Trousselier with 5 points. Brusoni won the fifth lap to increase his lead, 9 points to Bérard's 5 and Trousselier's 4.

The sixth and seventh laps went to Karl Duill, bringing him to 7 points and second place only 2 points behind Brusoni; Trousselier picked up 2 points on the sixth to stay in third place as Bérard dropped to fourth. The top three spots would not change again after that. Brusoni re-extended his lead on the eighth lap, winning it to place him at 12 points to Duill's 7. In the ninth lap, Trousselier won with Duill behind him; this brought them both to 9 points, only 3 points behind Brusoni.

Brusoni finished strong, however, with a win on the triple-value final lap for 9 points to take the top overall score at 21 points. Neither Duill nor Trousselier was able to score on that final lap. Duill held a tie-breaker over Trousselier, taking second place. Chaput's second-place finish on the last lap brought him 1 point behind the medalists.

Rank	Cyclist	Nation	1	2	3	4	5	6	7	8	9	10	Total
1st place, gold medalist(s)	Enrico Brusoni	Italy	0	3	3	0	3	0	0	3	0	9	21
2nd place, silver medalist(s)	Karl Duill	Germany	0	0	1	0	0	3	3	0	2	0	9
3rd place, bronze medalist(s)	Louis Trousselier	France	0	2	2	0	0	2	0	0	3	0	9
4	Chaput	France	0	0	0	0	2	0	0	0	0	6	8
5	J. Bérard	France	2	0	0	3	0	0	0	0	0	0	5
6	Adolphe Cayron	France	0	1	0	0	0	0	0	0	0	3	4
7	Octave Coisy	France	0	0	0	0	0	0	2	2	0	0	4
7	Ferdinand Vasserot	France	3	0	0	0	0	1	0	0	0	0	4
9	Marcel Dohis	France	1	0	0	0	1	0	0	0	0	0	2
9	Germain	France	0	0	0	0	0	0	1	1	0	0	2
9	Giacomo Stratta	Italy	0	0	0	2	0	0	0	0	0	0	2
12	Georges Coindre	France	0	0	0	1	0	0	0	0	0	0	1
12	Luigi Colombo	Italy	0	0	0	0	0	0	0	0	1	0	1
