= Cycling at the 1900 Summer Olympics – Men's sprint =

Men's sprint at the Games of the II Olympiad
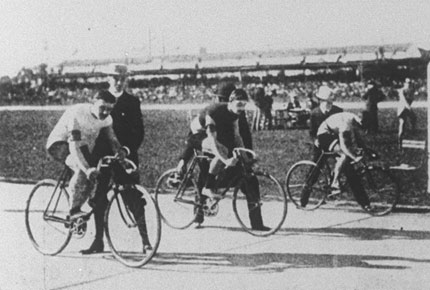
- The final: Albert Taillandier (France), Fernand Sanz (France) and John Henry Lake (USA)
- Venue: Vélodrome de Vincennes
- Dates: September 11 (heats and quarterfinals); September 13 (semifinals and final)
- Competitors: 69 from 6 nations

Medalists
1st place, gold medalist(s)		Albert Taillandier; France
2nd place, silver medalist(s)		Fernand Sanz; France
3rd place, bronze medalist(s)		John Henry Lake; United States

The men's sprint was one of the three cycling events, all track cycling, now regarded as "Olympic" on the Cycling at the 1900 Summer Olympics programme. It was held on 11 September and 13 September. The sprint, a 2000-metre race with 1000-metre heats, was conducted in four rounds. 69 of the 72 cyclists competed in the sprint, including cyclists from all six competing nations. The event was won by Albert Taillandier of France (the nation's second consecutive victory in the men's sprint), with his countryman Fernand Sanz in second place. John Henry Lake of the United States won the nation's first cycling medal with his bronze.

== Background ==
This was the second appearance of the event, which has been held at every Summer Olympics except 1904 and 1912. None of the cyclists from 1896 returned. Two of the three top sprinters in 1900 were French and competed: Ferdinand Vasserot and Albert Taillandier. (The third, Alphonse Didier-Nauts of Belgium, did not compete). An American, John Henry Lake, however, had finished second in the world championships to Didier-Nauts and was the most significant non-French competitor in the field.

Belgium, Bohemia, Italy, and the United States each made their debut in the men's sprint. France and Germany made their second appearance, having previously competed in 1896.

== Competition format ==
Unlike modern sprint events (which use a flying 200 metre time trial to cut down and seed the field, followed by one-on-one matches), the 1900 sprint used very large initial heats of up to eight cyclists each before smaller quarterfinals, semifinals, and final with three cyclists in each race. For the first round, the top three cyclists in each heat advanced; in the quarterfinals and semifinals, only the fastest man moved on. The distance for each race was 1 kilometre.

== Records ==
The records for the sprint are 200 metre flying time trial records, kept for the qualifying round in later Games as well as for the finish of races.

World record	Unknown	Unknown^{*}	Unknown	Unknown
Olympic record	N/A	N/A	N/A	N/A

^{*} World records were not tracked by the UCI until 1954.

Lloyd Hildebrand set the initial record of 15.4 seconds in the first heat. Adolphe Cayron improved on that in the second heat, to 14.2 seconds. John Henry Lake dropped the record to 14.0 seconds in heat 6. Antonio Restelli finished the first round with a 13.6 second time in the ninth heat. Lake responded with 13.2 seconds in the first quarterfinal, only to see Restelli go 13.0 seconds in the fourth. Albert Taillandier dropped below that to 12.6 seconds in the next quarterfinal, a time that held through the rest of the 1900 Games.

== Schedule ==
Date	Time	Round
Tuesday, 11 September 1900	9:00; 14:00	Round 1 Quarterfinals
Thursday, 13 September 1900		Semifinals; Final

== Results ==
=== Round 1 ===
The first round was held on 11 September. It began at 9 a.m. The top three cyclists in each of the 9 heats advanced to the quarterfinals.

==== Heat 1 ====
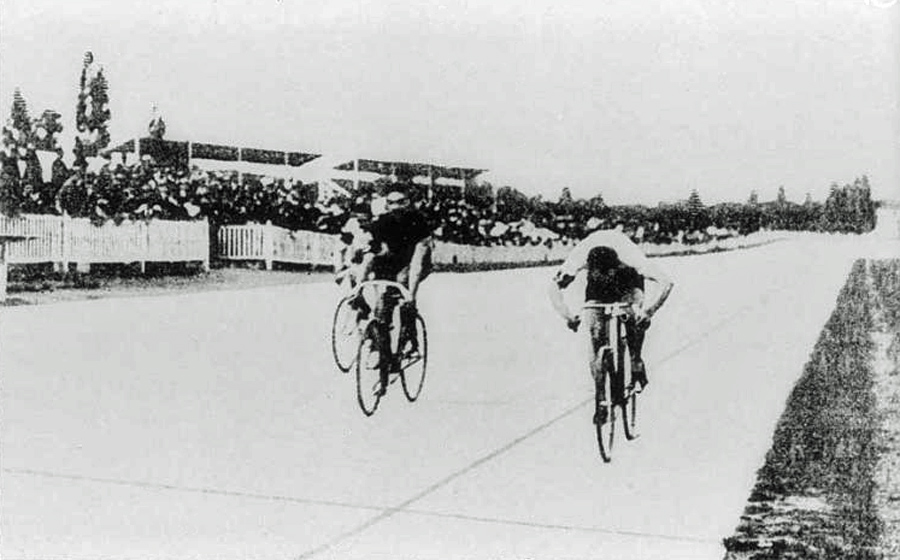
The finish of the final race

Stratta was a wheel behind Hildebrand, with Vasserot very close after that.

Rank	Cyclist	Nation	Time	200 m	Notes
1	Lloyd Hildebrand	France	1:34.2	15.4	Q, OR
2	Giacomo Stratta	Italy	—	—	Q
3	Ferdinand Vasserot	France	—	—	Q
4–8	Émile Dubois	France	—	—	
4–8	Dubourdieu	France	—	—	
4–8	L. Dumont	France	—	—	
4–8	František Hirsch	Bohemia	—	—	
4–8	Pouget	France	—	—	

==== Heat 2 ====
Coindre was a wheel behind Cayron; Daumain was not close.

Rank	Cyclist	Nation	Time	200 m	Notes
1	Adolphe Cayron	France	1:34.2	14.2	Q, OR
2	Georges Coindre	France	—	—	Q
3	Auguste Daumain	France	—	—	Q
4–8	Alfred Boulnois	France	—	—	
4–8	Romulo Bruni	Italy	—	—	
4–8	Saignier	France	—	—	
4–8	Émile Vadbled	France	—	—	
4–8	Vianzino	Italy	—	—	

==== Heat 3 ====
Sanz was a half-length behind Gottron.

Rank	Cyclist	Nation	Time	200 m	Notes
1	Paul Gottron	Germany	1:32.4	14.4	Q
2	Fernand Sanz	France	—	—	Q
3	Paul Rosso	France	—	—	Q
4–8	Charles Amberger	France	—	—	
4–8	L. Boyer	France	—	—	
4–8	Georges Neurouth	France	—	—	
4–8	A. Roger	France	—	—	
4–8	Ruez	France	—	—	

==== Heat 4 ====
Rank	Cyclist	Nation	Time	200 m	Notes
1	Paul Legrain	France	1:30.4	14.4	Q
2	Ernesto Mario Brusoni	Italy	—	—	Q
3	Théophile Fras	France	—	—	Q
4–8	Omer Beaugendre	France	—	—	
4–8	Octave Coisy	France	—	—	
4–8	Franzen	France	—	—	
4–8	Pichard	France	—	—	
4–8	L. Saunière	France	—	—	

==== Heat 5 ====
Davis was a length behind Maisonnave.

Rank	Cyclist	Nation	Time	200 m	Notes
1	Léon Maisonnave	France	1:35.8	14.4	Q
2	Will Davis	France	—	—	Q
3	Chaput	France	—	—	Q
4–8	Fernand Boulmant	France	—	—	
4–8	Georg Drescher	Germany	—	—	
4–8	Guillot	France	—	—	
4–8	Lohner	France	—	—	
4–8	Longchamp	France	—	—	

==== Heat 6 ====
Rank	Cyclist	Nation	Time	200 m	Notes
1	John Henry Lake	United States	1:35.8	14.0	Q
2	Paul Espeit	France	—	—	Q
3	Gaston Bullier	France	—	—	Q
4–8	J. Bérard	France	—	—	
4–8	Maxime Bertrand	France	—	—	
4–8	Vladislav Chalupa	France	—	—	
4–8	Jacques Droëtti	Italy	—	—	
4–8	M. Steitz	France	—	—	

==== Heat 7 ====
Dohis was a wheel behind Taillandier, with Germain a close third.

Rank	Cyclist	Nation	Time	200 m	Notes
1	Albert Taillandier	France	1:36.8	15.0	Q
2	Marcel Dohis	France	—	—	Q
3	Germain	France	—	—	Q
4–7	Georges Augoyat	France	—	—	
4–7	G. Bessing	France	—	—	
4–7	Luigi Colombo	Italy	—	—	
4–7	Maurice Monniot	France	—	—	

==== Heat 8 ====
Rank	Cyclist	Nation	Time	200 m	Notes
1	Karl Duill	Germany	1:35.4	14.4	Q
2	Léon Ponscarme	France	—	—	Q
3	Thomann	France	—	—	Q
4–6	Édouard Maibaum	France	—	—	
4–6	Pilton	France	—	—	
4–6	Maurice Terrier	France	—	—	
—	A. Porcher	France	DSQ	—	

==== Heat 9 ====
Wick and Hubault fell and did not finish.

Rank	Cyclist	Nation	Time	200 m	Notes
1	Antonio Restelli	Italy	1:37.6	13.6	Q, OR
2	Vincent	Belgium	—	—	Q
3	Joseph Mallet	France	—	—	Q
4–5	Caillet	France	—	—	
4–5	Mossmann	France	—	—	
—	P. Hubault	France	DNF	—	
—	Édouard Wick	France	DNF	—	

=== Quarterfinals ===
The quarterfinals were also held on the first day of competition, 11 September. They began at 2 p.m. Only the winning cyclist of each of the 9 quarterfinals advanced to the semifinals.

==== Quarterfinal 1 ====
Stratta was three lengths behind Lake.

Rank	Cyclist	Nation	Time	200 m	Notes
1	John Henry Lake	United States	2:02.0	13.2	Q, OR
2	Giacomo Stratta	Italy	—	—	
3	Chaput	France	—	—	

==== Quarterfinal 2 ====
Bullier was two lengths behind Sanz.

Rank	Cyclist	Nation	Time	200 m	Notes
1	Fernand Sanz	France	2:00.0	14.0	Q
2	Gaston Bullier	France	—	—	
3	Paul Rosso	France	—	—	

==== Quarterfinal 3 ====
Duill was a wheel behind Coindre.

Rank	Cyclist	Nation	Time	200 m	Notes
1	Georges Coindre	France	1:50.0	14.4	Q
2	Karl Duill	Germany	—	—	
3	Germain	France	—	—	

==== Quarterfinal 4 ====
Hildebrand was a wheel behind Restelli.

Rank	Cyclist	Nation	Time	200 m	Notes
1	Antonio Restelli	Italy	1:52.4	13.0	Q, OR
2	Lloyd Hildebrand	France	—	—	
3	Auguste Daumain	France	—	—	

==== Quarterfinal 5 ====
Vincent was two lengths behind Taillandier.

Rank	Cyclist	Nation	Time	200 m	Notes
1	Albert Taillandier	France	2:00.6	12.6	Q, OR
2	Vincent	Belgium	—	—	
3	Thomann	France	—	—	

==== Quarterfinal 6 ====
In a very close race, Brusoni was a quarter-wheel behind Mallet.

Rank	Cyclist	Nation	Time	200 m	Notes
1	Joseph Mallet	France	2:45.0	Unknown	Q
2	Ernesto Mario Brusoni	Italy	—	—	
3	Théophile Fras	France	—	—	

==== Quarterfinal 7 ====
Ponscarme was three lengths behind Maisonnave.

Rank	Cyclist	Nation	Time	200 m	Notes
1	Léon Maisonnave	France	1:49.2	14.2	Q
2	Léon Ponscarme	France	—	—	
3	Paul Espeit	France	—	—	

==== Quarterfinal 8 ====
Dohis was a half length behind Vasserot.

Rank	Cyclist	Nation	Time	200 m	Notes
1	Ferdinand Vasserot	France	2:21.6	14.2	Q
2	Marcel Dohis	France	—	—	
3	Will Davis	France	—	—	

==== Quarterfinal 9 ====
Rank	Cyclist	Nation	Time	200 m	Notes
1	Paul Legrain	France	2:57.4	13.8	Q
2	Paul Gottron	Germany	—	—	
3	Adolphe Cayron	France	—	—	

=== Semifinals ===
The semifinals were conducted on 13 September. The top cyclist in each of the three semifinals advanced to the final, guaranteeing himself a medal.

==== Semifinal 1 ====
Lake had defeated Vasserot previously in 1900, at the world championships where the two had placed second and third to Léon Didier-Nauts. Lake won again in this match, with Vasserot a short length behind.

Rank	Cyclist	Nation	Time	200 m	Notes
1	John Henry Lake	United States	2:09.6	13.6	Q
2	Ferdinand Vasserot	France	—	—	
3	Léon Maisonnave	France	—	—	

==== Semifinal 2 ====
Restelli was a half wheel behind Sanz.

Rank	Cyclist	Nation	Time	200 m	Notes
1	Fernand Sanz	France	2:46.6	13.4	Q
2	Antonio Restelli	Italy	—	—	
3	Georges Coindre	France	—	—	

==== Semifinal 3 ====
Rank	Cyclist	Nation	Time	200 m	Notes
1	Albert Taillandier	France	2:42.6	14.6	Q
2	Paul Legrain	France	—	—	
3	Joseph Mallet	France	—	—	

=== Final ===
The final was held on the same day as the semifinals, 13 September.

Rank	Cyclist	Nation	Time	200 m
1st place, gold medalist(s)	Albert Taillandier	France	2:52.0	13.0
2nd place, silver medalist(s)	Fernand Sanz	France	—	—
3rd place, bronze medalist(s)	John Henry Lake	United States	—	—

== Results summary ==
Rank	Cyclist	Nation	Round 1	Quarterfinals	Semifinals	Final	Notes
1st place, gold medalist(s)	Albert Taillandier	France	1st (15.0)	1st (12.6) OR	1st (14.6)	1st (13.0)	OR
2nd place, silver medalist(s)	Fernand Sanz	France	2nd	1st (14.0)	1st (13.4)	2nd	
3rd place, bronze medalist(s)	John Henry Lake	United States	1st (14.0)	1st (13.2) OR	1st (13.6)	3rd	
4	Paul Legrain	France	1st (14.4)	1st (13.8)	2nd	Did not advance	
4	Antonio Restelli	Italy	1st (13.6)	1st (13.0) OR	2nd	Did not advance	
4	Ferdinand Vasserot	France	3rd	1st (14.2)	2nd	Did not advance	
7	Georges Coindre	France	2nd	1st (14.4)	3rd	Did not advance	
7	Léon Maisonnave	France	1st (14.4)	1st (14.2)	3rd	Did not advance	
7	Joseph Mallet	France	3rd	1st (Unknown)	3rd	Did not advance	
10	Ernesto Mario Brusoni	Italy	2nd	2nd	Did not advance		
10	Gaston Bullier	France	3rd	2nd	Did not advance		
10	Marcel Dohis	France	2nd	2nd	Did not advance		
10	Karl Duill	Germany	1st (14.4)	2nd	Did not advance		
10	Paul Gottron	Germany	1st (14.4)	2nd	Did not advance		
10	Lloyd Hildebrand	France	1st (15.4)	2nd	Did not advance		
10	Léon Ponscarme	France	2nd	2nd	Did not advance		
10	Giacomo Stratta	Italy	2nd	2nd	Did not advance		
10	Vincent	Belgium	2nd	2nd	Did not advance		
19	Adolphe Cayron	France	1st (14.2)	3rd	Did not advance		
19	Chaput	France	3rd	3rd	Did not advance		
19	Auguste Daumain	France	3rd	3rd	Did not advance		
19	Will Davis	France	2nd	3rd	Did not advance		
19	Paul Espeit	France	2nd	3rd	Did not advance		
19	Théophile Fras	France	3rd	3rd	Did not advance		
19	Germain	France	3rd	3rd	Did not advance		
19	Paul Rosso	France	3rd	3rd	Did not advance		
19	Thomann	France	3rd	3rd	Did not advance		
28	Charles Amberger	France	4th–8th	Did not advance			
28	Georges Augoyat	France	4th–7th	Did not advance			
28	Omer Beaugendre	France	4th–8th	Did not advance			
28	J. Bérard	France	4th–8th	Did not advance			
28	Maxime Bertrand	France	4th–8th	Did not advance			
28	G. Bessing	France	4th–7th	Did not advance			
28	Fernand Boulmant	France	4th–8th	Did not advance			
28	Alfred Boulnois	France	4th–8th	Did not advance			
28	L. Boyer	France	4th–8th	Did not advance			
28	Romulo Bruni	Italy	4th–8th	Did not advance			
28	Caillet	France	4th–5th	Did not advance			
28	Vladislav Chalupa	France	4th–8th	Did not advance			
28	Octave Coisy	France	4th–8th	Did not advance			
28	Luigi Colombo	Italy	4th–7th	Did not advance			
28	Georg Drescher	Germany	4th–8th	Did not advance			
28	Jacques Droëtti	Italy	4th–8th	Did not advance			
28	Émile Dubois	France	4th–8th	Did not advance			
28	Dubourdieu	France	4th–8th	Did not advance			
28	L. Dumont	France	4th–8th	Did not advance			
28	Franzen	France	4th–8th	Did not advance			
28	Guillot	France	4th–8th	Did not advance			
28	František Hirsch	Bohemia	4th–8th	Did not advance			
28	Lohner	France	4th–8th	Did not advance			
28	Longchamp	France	4th–8th	Did not advance			
28	Édouard Maibaum	France	4th–6th	Did not advance			
28	Maurice Monniot	France	4th–7th	Did not advance			
28	Mossmann	France	4th–5th	Did not advance			
28	Georges Neurouth	France	4th–8th	Did not advance			
28	Pichard	France	4th–8th	Did not advance			
28	Pilton	France	4th–6th	Did not advance			
28	Pouget	France	4th–8th	Did not advance			
28	A. Roger	France	4th–8th	Did not advance			
28	Ruez	France	4th–8th	Did not advance			
28	Saignier	France	4th–8th	Did not advance			
28	L. Saunière	France	4th–8th	Did not advance			
28	M. Steitz	France	4th–8th	Did not advance			
28	Maurice Terrier	France	4th–6th	Did not advance			
28	Émile Vadbled	France	4th–8th	Did not advance			
28	Vianzino	Italy	4th–8th	Did not advance			
—	P. Hubault	France	DNF	Did not advance			
—	Édouard Wick	France	DNF	Did not advance			
—	A. Porcher	France	DSQ	Did not advance			
