= Cycling at the 1900 Summer Olympics – Men's 25 kilometres =

Cycling at the Olympics

25 kilometres at the Games of the II Olympiad
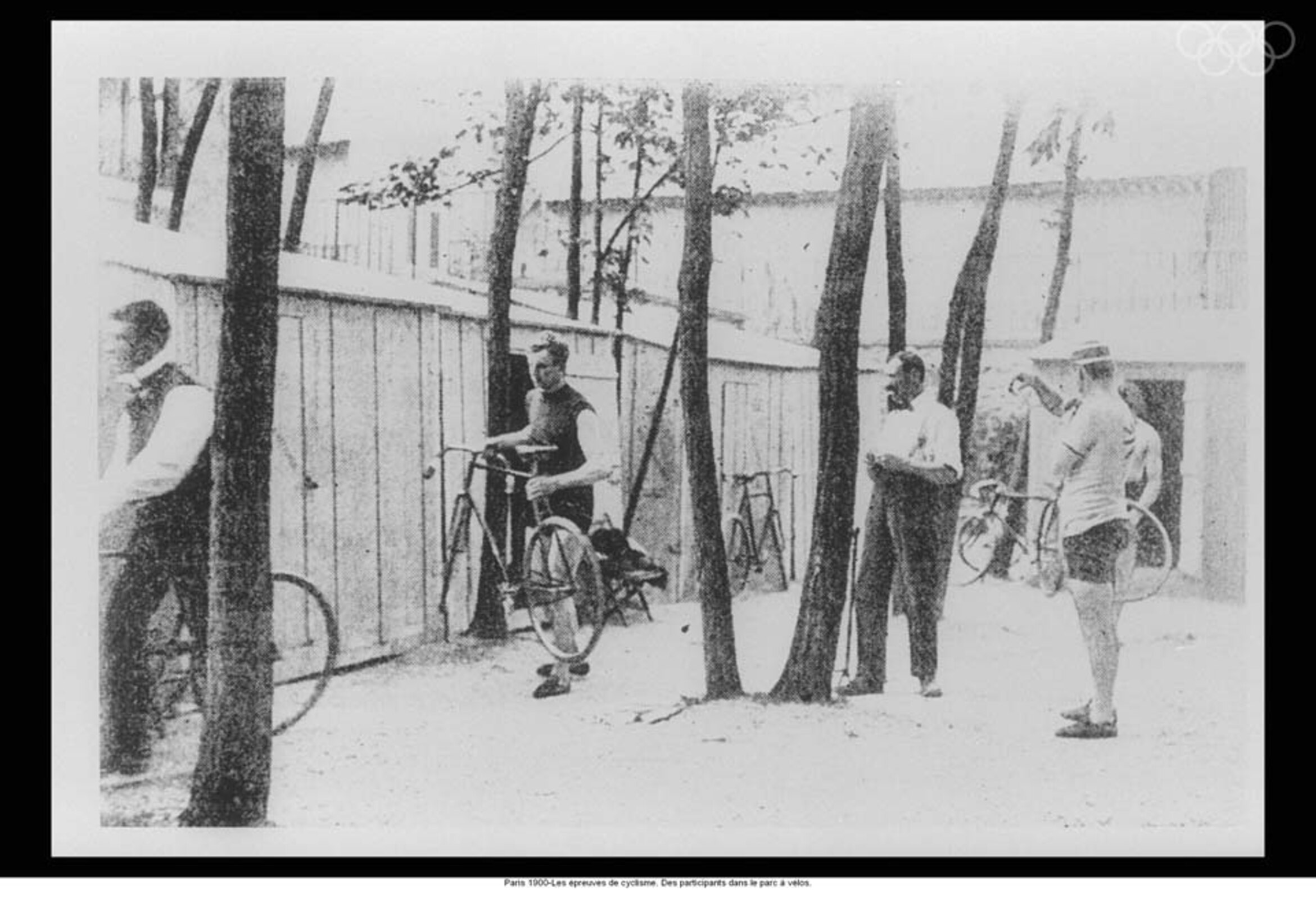
- Cyclists in the enclosure
- Venue: Vélodrome de Vincennes
- Date: September 15
- Competitors: 10 from 3 nations
- Winning time: 25:36.2

Medalists
1st place, gold medalist(s)		Louis Bastien; France
2nd place, silver medalist(s)		Lloyd Hildebrand; France
3rd place, bronze medalist(s)		Auguste Daumain; France

The men's 25 kilometres was one of three cycling events, all track cycling, on the Cycling at the 1900 Summer Olympics programme that were open to all amateurs, had more than one nation participating and no handicapping. It was held on 15 September. Ten cyclists competed. Four had already competed in the sprint event. The result of the race proved Louis Bastien of France to be the top long-distance cyclist present, while Lloyd Hildebrand finished in second and Auguste Daumain in third. One of the contestants, Louis Trousselier, would go on to win the 1905 Tour de France. Prizes were awarded to the top four finishers: art objects valued at 400 francs (for first place), 300 francs (for second), 200 francs (third), and 100 francs (fourth).

== Background ==
From 1896 to 1924 (excluding 1912, when no track events were held), the track cycling programme included events at a variety of distances that changed from Games to Games and ranged from the 1/4-mile to the 100 kilometres (and, even longer, the unique 12 hours race in 1896 that saw finishers exceed 300 kilometres). The 25 kilometres was held only in 1900. Louis Bastien was the favorite, having won the 100 kilometres world championship, with John Henry Lake (the sprint bronze medalist) and Lloyd Hildebrand also expected to do well.

== Competition format ==
As the name suggests, the race was 25 kilometres in length. The track was 500 metres in length, so there were 50 laps. A single race was held.

== Schedule ==
Date	Time	Round
Saturday, 15 September 1900		Final

== Results ==
Bastien took the lead early. Lake and Hildebrand were close behind, until Lake dropped out. Bertrand was 3 laps behind.

Rank	Cyclist	Nation	10 km	20 km	Time
1st place, gold medalist(s)	Louis Bastien	France	10:04.6	20:28.0	25:36.2
2nd place, silver medalist(s)	Lloyd Hildebrand	France	Unknown	Unknown	28:09.4
3rd place, bronze medalist(s)	Auguste Daumain	France	Unknown	Unknown	29:36.2
4	Maxime Bertrand	France	Unknown	Unknown	Unknown
—	Léon Gingembre	France	Unknown	Unknown	DNF
—	Louis Trousselier	France	Unknown	Unknown	DNF
—	John Henry Lake	United States	Unknown	Unknown	DNF
—	A. Porcher	France	Unknown	Unknown	DNF
—	Paul Gottron	Germany	Unknown	Unknown	DNF
—	J. Bérard	France	Unknown	Unknown	DNF
