= Battle of Sidi Brahim =

1845 battle of the French conquest of Algeria

Coordinates: 35.2606°N 0.5675°W

- Part of the French conquest of Algeria
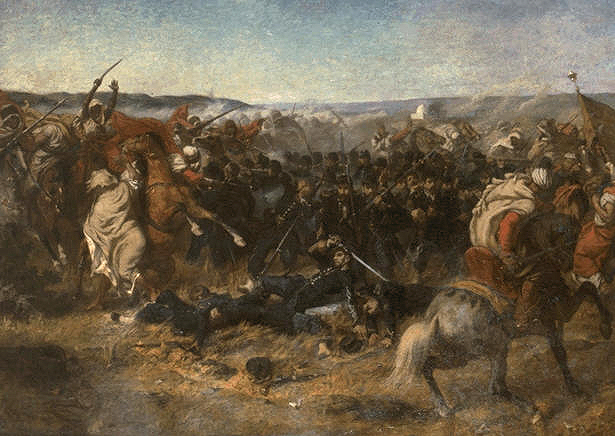
- Battle of Sidi Brahim by Louis-Théodore Devilly.
Date	23–25 September 1845
Location	Souahlia, Algeria
Result	Algerian victory

Belligerents
Kingdom of France	Emirate of Mascara

Commanders and leaders
Lucien de Montagnac †; Major Cognord (surrendered); Captain Dutertre (surrendered) (executed); Captain de Géreaux †	Emir Abdelkader

Strength
c. 500	1,000 to 1,200

Casualties and losses
7 to 12 survivors 400 killed or 300+ killed, 100 prisoners	Unknown

The Battle of Sidi Brahim, 23 to 25 September 1845, took place during the French conquest of Algeria, near Souahlia in Tlemcen Province. Between 1,000 and 1,200 Algerian irregulars under Emir Abdelkader ambushed a French detachment of around 500 led by Lieutenant-Colonel Lucien de Montagnac. Most of the latter were killed or captured in the initial fighting, and only a handful were reported to have ultimately survived the encounter.

Despite their defeat, the French used the battle as a symbol of the price paid to acquire French Algeria, and in 1898, a monument to the "martyrs of Sidi-Brahim" was installed in Oran. After Algerian independence in 1962, the monument was transformed into one commemorating Emir Abdelkader, and anti-colonial resistance in general.

== Background ==
The French conquest of Algeria began with the capture of Algiers in 1830, and over the next decade expanded along the coast. In 1840, three French provinces were created, Constantine in the east, Alger in the centre, and Oran in the west. However, intense fighting continued in western Algeria under the leadership of Emir Abdelkader, who at one point controlled most of the countryside. Although isolated French detachments were still vulnerable to surprise attacks, by 1845 a ruthless scorched earth policy employing small numbers of fast moving troops had eliminated most remaining resistance.

In September 1845, Abdelkader re-entered Algeria from his base across the border in Morocco. In response, Louis-Eugène Cavaignac, governor of Oran province, despatched three separate columns to intercept him, one led by Lieutenant-Colonel Lucien de Montagnac, commander of the Ghazaouet garrison. Allegedly unpopular with his troops, Montagnac was a hard-bitten colonial veteran, whose "own writings boast of several war crimes".

On 20 September, Montagnac received despatches from Cavaignac, urging him to redouble his efforts to intercept Abdelkader. Informed by local sources that the latter was near Souahlia, twenty kilometres to the south, the French commander left Ghazaouet at 10:00 pm on 21 September, with six companies of light infantry, and two sections of hussars, around 420 men in total. (Note: According to official returns, his detachment consisted of 346 to 350 men from the 8th Chasseurs, and 60 from the 2nd Hussars.) The column marched through the night and part of the 22nd, before making camp near what is now Duar Adadin, 22 kilometres south-west of Ghazzouet.

== Battle ==
On the evening of 22 September, the French made camp near Souahlia, and just after 9:00 am on 23 September, Montagnac spotted a small force of Algerian cavalry in the distance. Leaving only two companies to guard the baggage, he led the rest of his detachment to intercept them. The hussars, led by Major de Couby, charged into what proved to be a well-planned trap, and within minutes, the entire force was killed or captured, including Montagnac and de Couby. According to Jacques Garnier, the number of their opponents was over 3,000, but Ismail Al Arabi puts them at between 1,000 and 1,200.

One of the two companies in reserve tried to rescue their comrades but was also overwhelmed, leaving 79 men from the 8th Carabinier Company under Captain Géreaux, along with six hussars. These men withdrew into a nearby building, a monument to a local Marabout known as the saint of Sidi Brahim, and after whom the battle is named. They were surrounded, and one of the French prisoners, adjutant Captain Dutertre, was ordered to demand their surrender, but instead urged them to fight to the death, and was promptly executed.

Over the next two days, the French fought off a series of assaults, but by 25 September were running low on ammunition and without water. They took advantage of a lull in the fighting to break out, but were caught by the Algerians only three kilometres from Ghazaouet. In the ensuing combat, Géreaux was killed and the French reduced to twenty men before being rescued by the local garrison. Some subsequently died of wounds or exhaustion.

Estimates of French casualties range from 300 to 400 dead. The number of survivors is estimated at between seven to twelve soldiers.

== Legacy ==
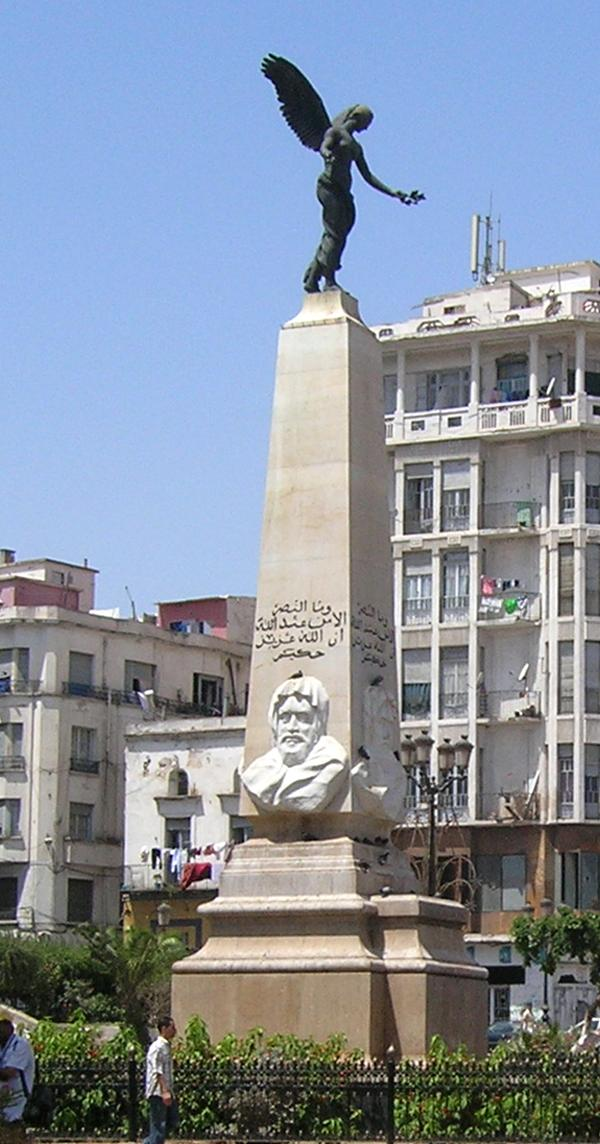
Sidi-Brahim monument in Oran, now a memorial to Emir Abdelkader

In addition to those killed in the fighting, sources estimate 100 prisoners were taken at Sidi Brahim, along with another 200 soldiers from a relief column, who surrendered without a fight near Aïn Témouchent. The prisoners were marched into Morocco, in the hope of exchanging them for Algerians held by the French, but the latter refused to do so. With the exception of a number of officers, most of the remainder were executed in April 1846.

Despite their defeat, the French used the battle as a symbol of the "blood sacrifice" paid to create French Algeria. In 1898, a monument to the "martyrs of Sidi-Brahim" was erected in Oran, but after Algerian independence in 1962, it was transformed into one of anti-colonial resistance, and the nationalist hero, Emir Abdelkader. Parts of the original monument were removed, including the statue of Marianne, which can now be seen in the village of Périssac, birthplace of Géreaux.

The remains of the French soldiers killed at Sidi Brahim were initially buried at Djemmaa Ghazaouet in the Tombeau des Braves. In 1965, these were transferred to the Musée des Chasseurs in Vincennes, and in 2000, a new memorial inaugurated as part of commemorations for the 155th anniversary of the battle. The anniversary of the battle is still celebrated each year by Chasseur units of the French Army.

== Sources ==
- Al Arabi, Ismail (1986). The Battle of Sidi Ibrahim and the fate of its prisoners (in Arabic). National Foundation for Printing Arts, Reggae Unit - Algeria.
- Caron, Pierre (1905). "Lt Paul Azan; Récits d'Afrique, Sidi-Brahim, 1905". Revue d'Histoire Moderne & Contemporaine (in French).
- Clayton, Anthony (1988). France, soldiers, and Africa. Brassey's Defence Publishers. ISBN 978-0-08-034748-6.
- Clodfelter, Micheal (2017). Warfare and Armed Conflicts. McFarland. ISBN 978-0-7864-7470-7.
- Danziger, Raphael (1977). Abd Al-Qadir and the Algerians - Resistance to the French and Internal Consolidation. Homes and Maiers. ISBN 978-0841902367.
- Garnier, Jacques (2004). Dictionnaire Perrin des guerres et des batailles de l'histoire de France (in French). Perrin. ISBN 9782262008291.
- Horne, Alistair (1977). A Savage War of Peace; Algeria 1954-1962 (1996 ed.). Papermac. ISBN 978-0333669518.
- Holstein, Christine (2019). Walking In the Footsteps of the Fallen Verdun 1916. Pen and Sword Military. ISBN 978-1-5267-1707-8.
- Marston, Elsa (2013). The compassionate warrior: Abd el-Kader of Algeria. Wisdom Tales. ISBN 978-1937786106.
- Manceron, Gilles (2003). Marianne et les colonies (in French). La découverte. ISBN 978-2707138798.
- Marin, John Joseph (1847). Défense du lieutenant Marin devant le Conseil d'enquête de Perpignan, le 4 septembre 1847 (in French). Felix Mateste.
- Pernot, A (1905). Nafziger, George (ed.). The Battle of Sidi Brahim 23, 24, 25, & 26 September (2014 ed.). Saint Die des Vosges. ISBN 978-1585454068.
- Ruedy, John (2005). Modern Algeria : the origins and development of a nation. Indiana University Press. ISBN 978-0253217820.
- Tucker, Spencer C. (2009). A Global Chronology of Conflict. ABC-CLIO. ISBN 978-1-85109-672-5.
