= John Henry Lake =

American cyclist (born 1877)

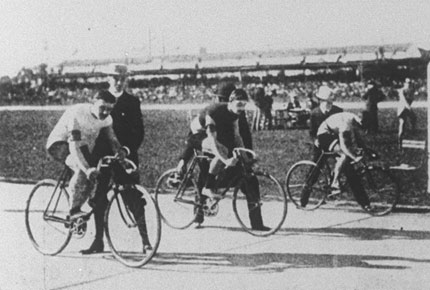
- The final sprint at the 1900 Olympics: Albert Taillandier (France), Fernand Sanz (France) and John Henry Lake (USA)

Personal information
- Born: July 27, 1877 Staten Island, New York, USA
- Height: 172 cm (5 ft 8 in)

Cycling career
- Sport: Cycling
Medal record
Men's track cycling
Representing United States
Olympic Games
Bronze medal – third place	1900 Paris	Men's sprint

John Henry Lake (born July 27, 1877, date of death unknown) was an American racing cyclist who competed in the late 19th century and early 20th century. He was born in Port Richmond, Staten Island. He participated in Cycling at the 1900 Summer Olympics in Paris and won the equivalent of the modern bronze medal in the men's 2 km sprint. (The current gold-silver-bronze medal format was introduced in 1904.) He also competed in the 25 km race, but did not finish.

In 1900 Lake invented a machine that allowed him to ride his bike on a stand that, with the help of a partner, would grind the blades of skates.
