= Tertre =

Tertre may refer to:

People:

- Estienne du Tertre (mid-16th century), a French composer
- Jean-Baptiste Du Tertre (1610–1687), French blackfriar and botanist

Places:

- Tertre, Wallonia, a town in the province of Hainaut, Belgium
- Juvigny-le-Tertre, commune in the Manche department in northwestern France
- Le Tertre-Saint-Denis, village and commune in the Yvelines département of northern France
- Place du Tertre, square in XVIIIe arrondissement of Paris
- Saint-Martin-du-Tertre, Val-d'Oise, town and a commune in the Val-d'Oise département, in the French region of Île-de-France
- Saint-Martin-du-Tertre, Yonne, commune in the Yonne département, in the French region of Burgundy
- Saint-Nicolas-du-Tertre, commune in the Morbihan department of Brittany in northwestern France
- Villers-au-Tertre, commune in the Nord department in northern France

Other:

- Château du Tertre, winery in the Margaux appellation of the Bordeaux region of France, in the commune of Arsac
