= Amberger =

Amberger is a surname. Notable people with the surname include:

- Charles Amberger (1882–1901), French cyclist
- Christoph Amberger (c. 1505 – 1562), German painter
- Eloise Amberger (born 1987), Australian synchronized swimmer
- Georg Amberger (1890–1949), German middle-distance runner
- J. Christoph Amberger (born 1963), German-American writer, publisher, jurist
