= František Hirsche =

Czech cyclist

Personal information
- Full name: František Hirsche
- Born: 2 December 1878
- Died: 6 June 1971 (aged 92)

Cycling career
- Sport: Cycling

František Hirsche (2 December 1878 – 5 June 1971) was a Bohemian cyclist. He competed in the men's sprint event at the 1900 Summer Olympics.
