= Ferdinand Vasserot =

French cyclist

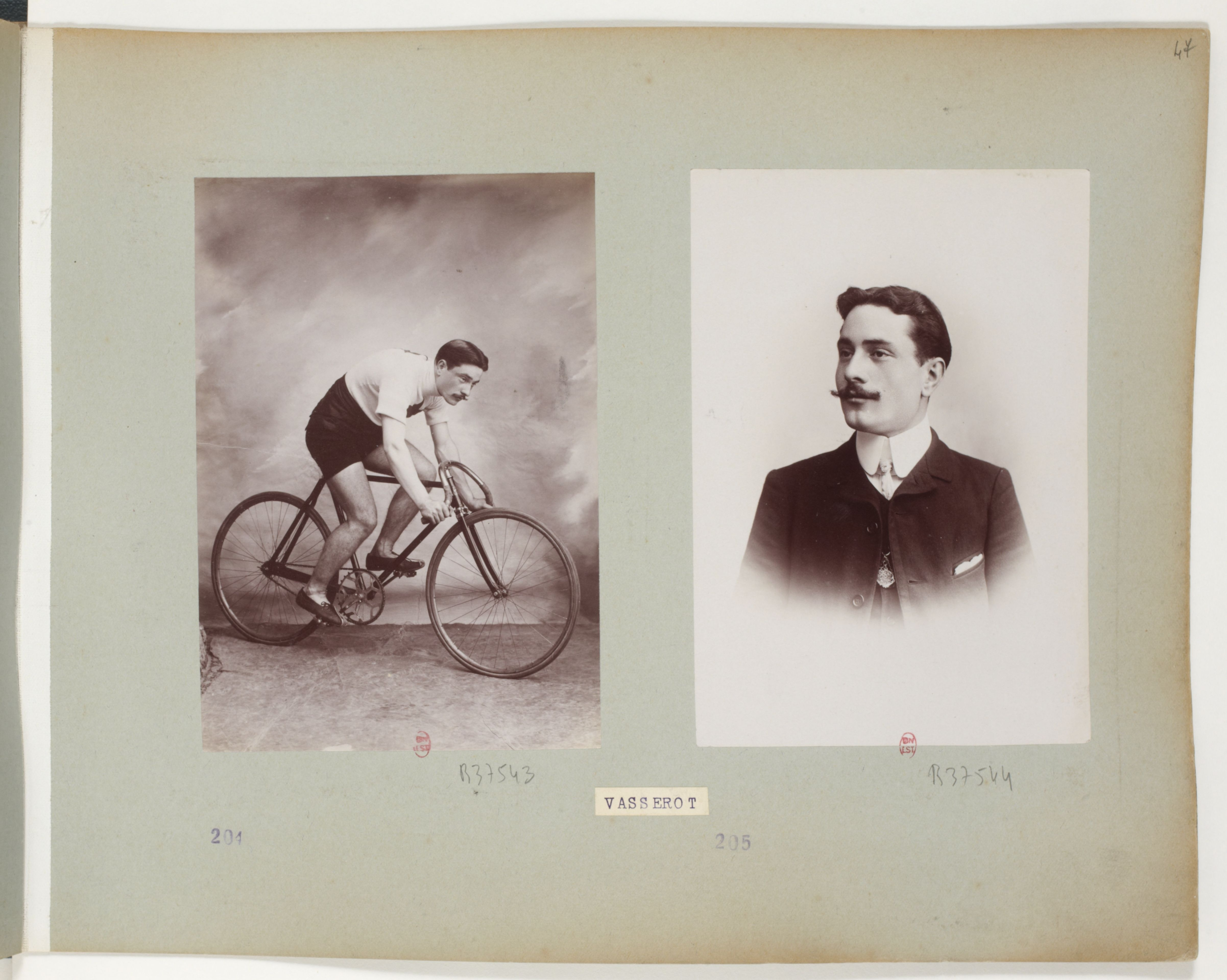
- Vasserot in 1902

Personal information
- Born: 2 March 1881 Paris, France
- Died: 7 February 1963 (aged 81) Lizy-sur-Ourcq, France
- Height: 164 cm (5 ft 5 in)

Cycling career
- Sport: Cycling
- Discipline: Track
- Role: Rider

Amateur team
- Association Vélocipédique Internationale, Paris

Ferdinand Vasserot (2 March 1881 – 7 February 1963) was a French track cyclist. He competed in the sprint event and points race event at the 1900 Summer Olympics.

A dentist by profession, he completed his military service from 1902 to 1905 with the 102nd Infantry Regiment.
