= Léon Ponscarme =

French cyclist

Personal information
- Born: 21 January 1879 Paris, France
- Died: 24 November 1916 (aged 37) Verdun, France

Cycling career
- Sport: Cycling

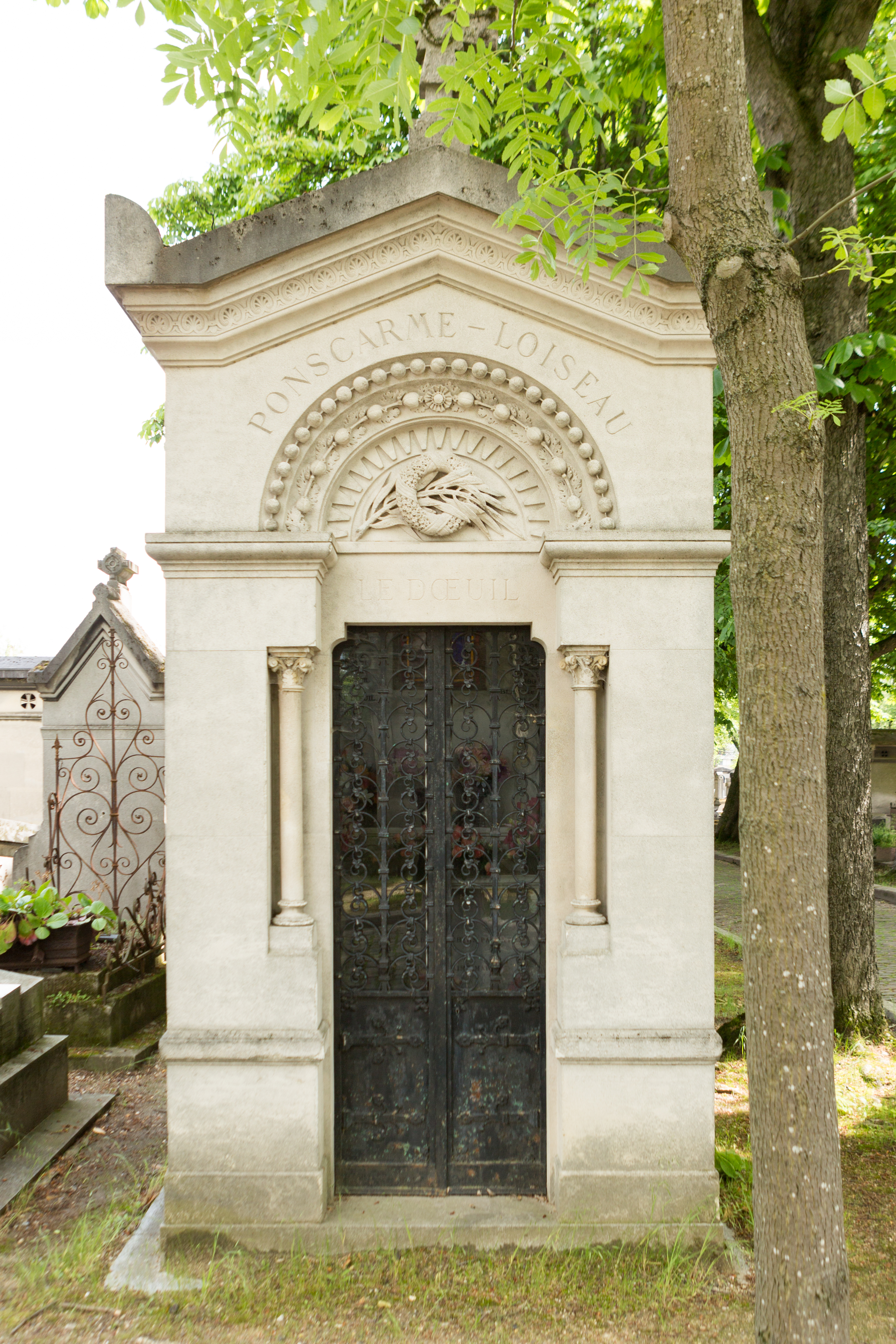
Père-Lachaise Cemetery

Léon Honoré Ponscarme Jr. (21 January 1879 – 24 November 1916) was a French cyclist. He competed in the men's sprint event at the 1900 Summer Olympics. He was killed in action during World War I.

== See also ==
- List of Olympians killed in World War I
