= Elena Sanz =

Spanish opera singer (1844–1898)

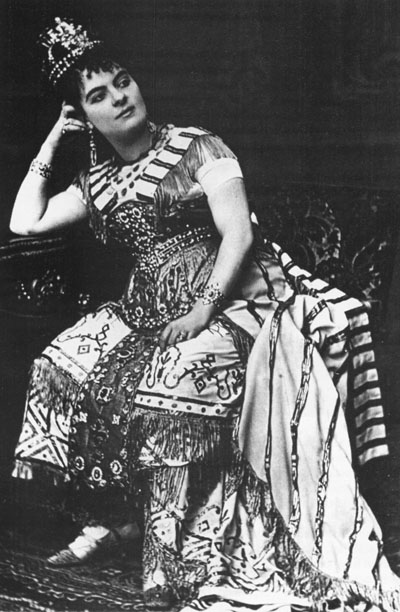
- Born: Elena Armanda Nicolasa Sanz y Martínez de Arizala; 6 December 1844; Castellon de la Plana, Spain
- Died: 24 December 1898 (aged 54); Paris, France
- Partner: Alfonso XII of Spain
- Family: 3, including Fernand Sanz

Elena Armanda Nicolasa Sanz y Martínez de Arizala (1844–1898) was a Spanish opera singer from the 19th century and the mistress of Alfonso XII of Spain.

== Biography ==
Elena Sanz was born on 6 December 1844, in Castellón de la Plana (España). She was educated mainly at the Girls' School in Leganes along with her sister. At the age of ten, she entered the institution to learn singing, and joined a choir. She was a student of Baltasar Saldoni in the Madrid Royal Conservatory.

She met Alfonso XII of Spain in Vienna in 1872.

In 1875, she had her first child from an unknown father. Later during the years, she had two sons more with King Alfonso XII of Spain. The King of Spain died at the age of 28 without recognizing his two sons, Alfonso and Fernando.

In 1876, she was hired by the Paris Opera for two years, and she played her most important and influential roles there – Maddalena of Rigoletto and Brangäne in Tristan and Isolde. During the same years, she also made a premiere at the Teatro Real in Madrid.

=== Appearance ===
Her contemporaries often considered her one of the best opera singers in Spain. Elena travelled all across Europe to display her set of singing skills. She was most valued in the Paris Theater. Castelar described her as a red-lipped, brown-skinned, white-teeth, black hair woman, shining like a star.

== Literature appearances ==
Elena Sanz was often portrayed in fictional texts in Spain. In 2013, the writer Tomás Gismera Velasco featured Elena Sanz in his work "Elena Sanz: Tu serás mi reina".

She was also featured by Benito Pérez Galdós in his narratives concerning Sanz's relations with the monarch Alfonso XII.
