= Souahlia =

Coordinates: 35°02′N 1°53′W

- Commune and town
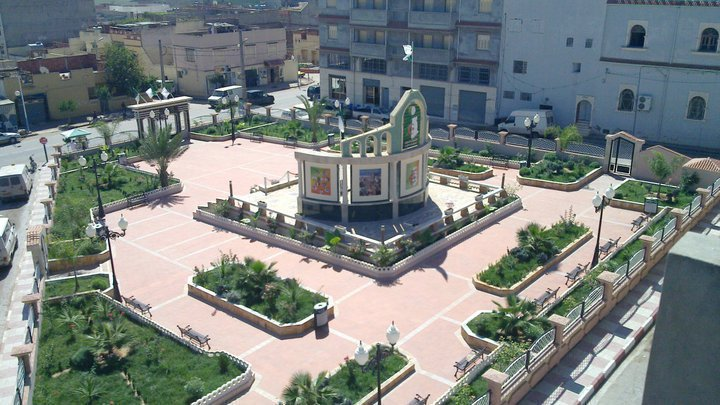

- Country: Algeria
- Province: Tlemcen Province

Population (2008)
  - Total: 22,245
- Time zone: UTC+1 (CET)
- Code Postal: 13020

Souahlia is a town and commune in Tlemcen Province in north-western Algeria. The Battle of Sidi Brahim was fought nearby in September 1845 during the French conquest of Algeria.
