= Lucien de Montagnac =

French soldier (1803–1845)

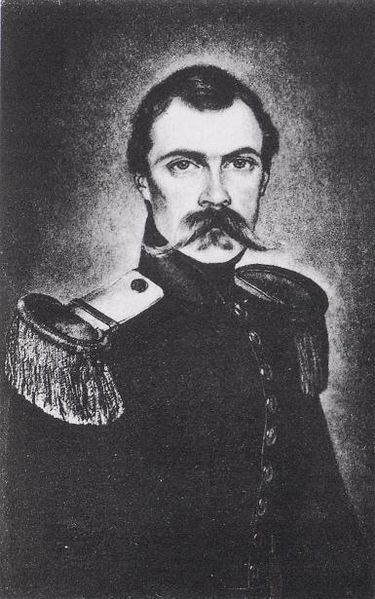
Self-portrait

Lucien-François de Montagnac (17 May 1803 – 23 September 1845) was a French lieutenant colonel. Sent to Africa in 1845, he was responsible for several massacres of civilians during the French conquest of Algeria and was killed at the Battle of Sidi-Brahim.

== Life ==
Montagnac was born in Pouru-aux-Bois. He took part in the Spanish expedition of 1823 and rose to lieutenant on 30 December 1827. He severely put down the June Rebellion in 1832 but refused the Légion d'honneur he was offered in reward by Louis-Philippe of France, explaining he was "resolved to await this reward on an occasion I will better deserve it."

=== Sidi-Brahim ===
On September 21, 1845, Montagnac was the senior commander of the Nemours post (province of Oran), today Ghazaouet. Responding to the call of neighboring tribes who feared a raid led by Abd el-Kader, Lieutenant-Colonel Montagnac with 450 men of the 15th Léger moved into the area (390 from the 8th Battalion of Chasseurs d'Orléans and 60 from the 2nd Hussar Regiment). Drawn into an ambush, he was attacked by horsemen led by Abd-el-Kader. The column was almost entirely destroyed and a hundred men were taken prisoner. Montagnac, who was leading the troops, was killed in the fighting.

His body was torn to shreds and his head cut off by Abd-el-Kader's troops, as were all the heads of the French soldiers killed in combat, two hundred and fifty in all. The prisoners were forced to carry the heads coated with honey (to preserve them) to the camp of the victors, then to arrange them in a circle. A feast was held around the heads; Abd-el-Kader sent them to the king of Morocco, to signal his strength.

The company of carabiniers that remained in the bivouac had managed to reach the marabout of Sidi Brahim where they resisted the attacks of the algerians. The men had only a bottle of absinthe for them, they had to drink their urine to quench their thirst; deprived of ammunition, they cut their last bullets into four. Abd-el-Kader, who himself led this attack, although he ordered several French prisoners to be killed, sent several letters written in French to the 80 carabiniers to promise them their lives if they agreed to surrender; they refused.

The Emir Abd El Kader had the head of Captain Dutertre cut off, taken prisoner and brought before the marabout to demand the surrender of the Chasseurs. Despite everything, Dutertre had time to exhort the survivors to fight to the death.

Towards the evening of the 2nd day, Captain Géreaux, the only officer who had not been killed with Lieutenant Chappedelaine, went out with his soldiers to head towards Djemaâ Ghazaouet. A few kilometres from the camp, this troop could not resist the confrontation with Berber fighters. The Chasseurs made their way through the hundreds of enemies gathered. Captain Géreaux was killed and of his 82 men, only 11 survived, including a hussar.

=== Massacres ===
Colonel de Montagnac was quoted as saying while in Algeria, "I have some heads cut off, not the heads of artichokes but the heads of men."

"All populations who do not accept our conditions must be despoiled. Everything must be seized, devastated, without age or sex distinction: grass must not grow any more where the French army has set foot. Who wants the end wants the means, whatever may say our philanthropists? I personally warn all good soldiers whom I have the honour to lead that if they happen to bring me a living Arab, they will receive a beating with the flat of the saber. This is how, my dear friend, we must make war against Arabs: kill all men over the age of fifteen, take all their women and children, load them onto naval vessels, send them to the Marquesas Islands or elsewhere. In one word, annihilate everything that will not crawl beneath our feet like dogs."
