= Paul Espeit =

French cyclist

Personal information
- Born: 9 June 1878 Lamastre, France
- Died: 23 May 1960 (aged 81) Mantes-la-Jolie, France

Cycling career
- Sport: Cycling

Paul Marius Raymond Espeit (9 June 1878 – 23 May 1960) was a French cyclist. He competed in the men's sprint event at the 1900 Summer Olympics.
