= Édouard Wick =

French cyclist

Personal information
- Full name: Édouard Wick

Cycling career
- Sport: Cycling

Édouard Wick was a French cyclist. He competed in the men's sprint event at the 1900 Summer Olympics. Wick raced for the Guidon Vélocipédique Parisien Club. In addition to his Olympic appearance, in 1900 he competed at both the World Sprint Championships, and the Grand Prix de Paris, but did not place in either event.
