= Octave Coisy =

French cyclist

Personal information
- Born: Octave Adolphe Coisy; 19 February 1880; Saint-Ouen, France
- Died: 18 August 1947 (aged 67); Lyon, France

Octave Adolphe Coisy (19 February 1880 – 18 August 1947) was a French cyclist. He competed in the sprint and the points race at the 1900 Summer Olympics.
