= Louis Bastien (cyclist) =

French cyclist and fencer

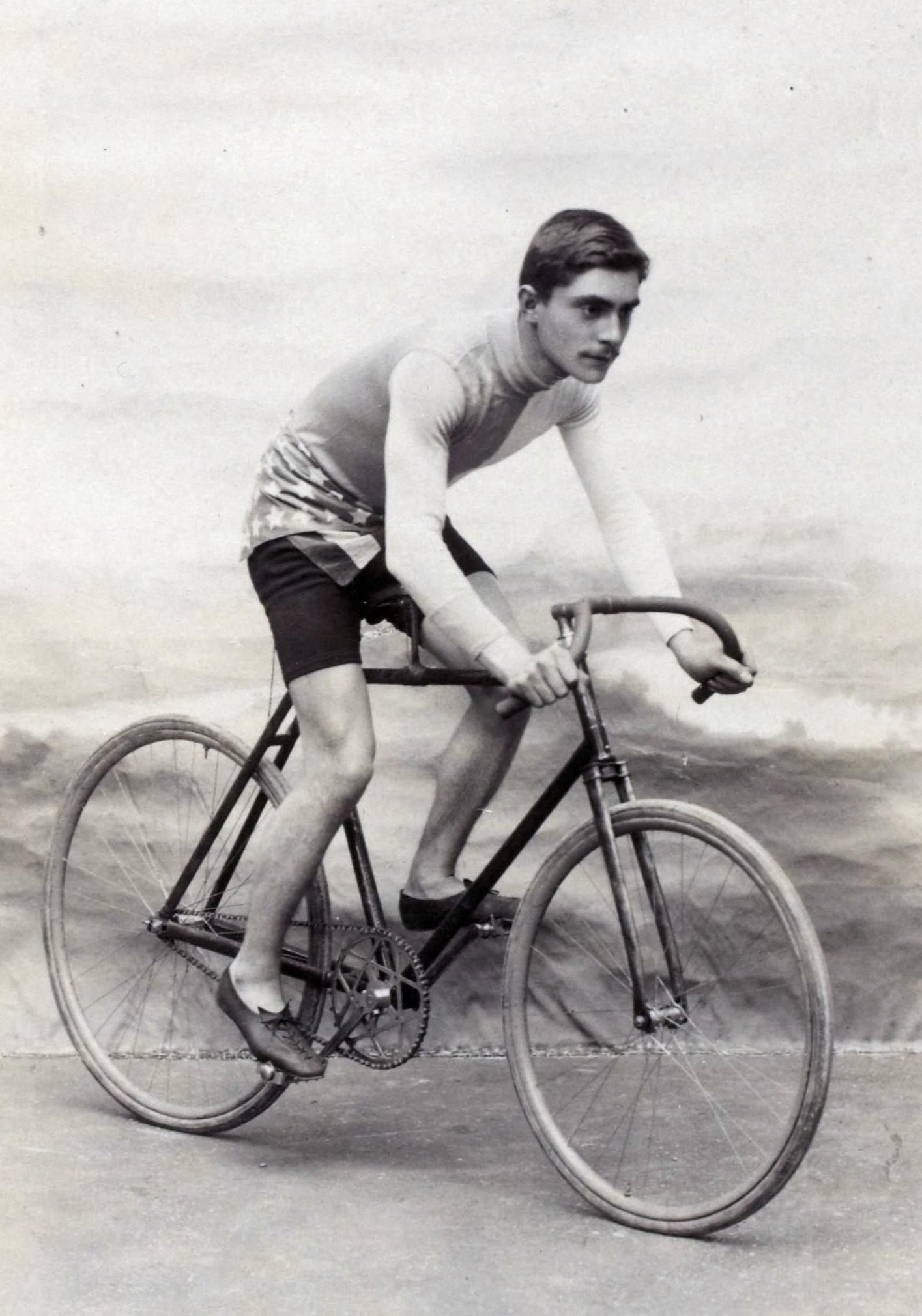
- Bastien in 1900

Personal information
- Born: 26 October 1881 Paris, France
- Died: 13 August 1963 (aged 81)

Cycling career
- Sport: Cycling
- Discipline: Racing cyclist
- Role: Rider
Medal record
Representing France
Men's track cycling
Olympic Games
Gold medal – first place	1900 Paris	25 kilometres

Eugène Louis Bastien (26 October 1881 in Paris – 13 August 1963) was a French racing cyclist and fencer who competed in the late 19th century and early 20th century. He participated in Cycling at the 1900 Summer Olympics in Paris and won the gold medal in the men's 25 kilometre race. He also competed in the individual épée event at the same games.
