= Georges Neurouth =

French cyclist

- Born: 24 September 1881; Paris, France
- Died: 6 September 1914 (aged 32); Barcy, Seine-et-Marne, France

Georges Neurouth (24 September 1881 – 6 September 1914) was a French cyclist. He competed at the 1900 Summer Olympics in the men's sprint. He did not finish in the third heat of the first round.

== Personal life ==
Neurouth served as a lieutenant in the 246th Infantry Regiment of the French Army during the First World War. He was killed in action in Seine-et-Marne on 6 September 1914.
