= Georg Drescher =

German cyclist

Personal information
- Born: 17 March 1870 Mainz, Grand Duchy of Hesse
- Died: 23 October 1938 (aged 68) Vienna, State of Austria, Nazi Germany

Cycling career
- Sport: Cycling

Georg Drescher (17 March 1870 – 23 October 1938) was a German cyclist. He participated in the men's sprint event at the 1900 Summer Olympics.
