= Alfred Boulnois =

French cyclist

Personal information
- Full name: Alfred Boulnois

Cycling career
- Sport: Cycling

Alfred Boulnois was a French cyclist. He competed in the men's sprint event at the 1900 Summer Olympics.
