= Adolphe Cayron =

French cyclist

Personal information
- Full name: Adolphe Cayron
- Born: 28 September 1878 Sonnac, Aveyron, France
- Died: 7 September 1950 (aged 71) Villeneuve-le-Roi, France

Cycling career
- Sport: Cycling

Adolphe Cayron (28 September 1878 – 7 September 1950) was a French cyclist. He competed in the men's sprint event at the 1900 Summer Olympics.
