= Stagliano =

Stagliano is an Italian surname, and may refer to:

- John Stagliano, U.S. pornographic actor
- Riccardo Staglianò, Italian online journalist
- Antonio Staglianò, Bishop of Noto, Sicily
- Nick Stagliano, film director and producer
- Tricia Devereaux, American pornographic actress
