= Romulo Bruni =

Italian cyclist

Personal information
- Full name: Romolo Giovanni Rafaele Buni
- Nicknames: Le petit diable noir, Il piccolo diavolo nero
- Born: 18 May 1871 Milan, Kingdom of Italy
- Died: 14 May 1939 (aged 67) Milan, Italy

Cycling career
- Sport: Cycling

Amateur team
- Pro Patria Milano, Milan

Romolo Giovanni Rafaele Buni (18 May 1871 – 14 May 1939) was an Italian cyclist. He competed in the men's sprint event at the 1900 Summer Olympics.

== Biography ==
Born in the Porta Lodovica district of Milan, Buni was the grandson of a bicycle manufacturer and began competing in cycling at the age of 13.

During the final decade of the 19th century, he was a successful track cyclist and became known as "The Little Black Devil". In 1893, in Milan, he defeated the French champions Paul Medinger and Georges Cassignard in a challenge at the Arena Civica; in the same year, in Alessandria, he finished as runner-up in the Italian professional sprint championship, defeated only by Adolfo Ruscelli. In March of the following year, at the Trotter in Milan on Via Doria, he challenged a purported Buffalo Bill—in reality an impersonator—in a celebrated bicycle-versus-horse contest. The horseman won after a competition lasting three days and comprising eleven events.

On 16 January 1902, together with Gilberto Marley, Buni was one of the founders of Calcio US Milanese, which was initially active in cycling and later also in association football, and served as its president for seven years. In November 1905, he started the first edition of the Giro di Lombardia. In 1907, he donated a trophy, the Coppa Romolo Buni, to the Italian Football Federation. The trophy was awarded to the winning team of the 1908 and 1909 Italian First Category championships, although the latter was subsequently disowned by the federation in favour of the 1909 Federal Championship.

A well-known figure in cycling during this period, Buni, despite having been inactive for four years, was invited by Armando Cougnet to start the first 1909 Giro d'Italia. He accepted the invitation but abandoned the race during the second stage.

Buni died from the after-effects of a car accident, and La Gazzetta dello Sport reportedly published a notable obituary following his death.
