= Fernand Sanz =

Spanish-French cyclist

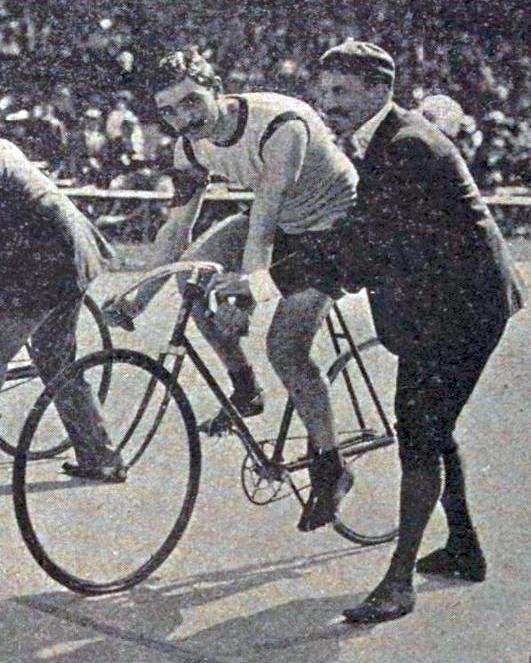
- Sanz at the amateur Grand Prix of Paris in 1902

Personal information
- Full name: Fernando Sanz y Martínez de Arizala
- Born: 28 February 1881 Madrid, Spain
- Died: 8 January 1925 (aged 43) Pau, France

Cycling career
- Sport: Cycling
Medal record
Men's track cycling
Representing France
Olympic Games
Silver medal – second place	1900 Paris	Sprint

Fernando "Fernand" Sanz y Martínez de Arizala (28 February 1881 – 8 January 1925) was a Spanish-born naturalized French racing cyclist, younger of two illegitimate sons of King Alfonso XII of Spain and his mistress, Elena Sanz. He participated in cycling at the 1900 Summer Olympics in Paris for France, and there won the silver medal in the men's sprint.
