= Uberto Visconti di Modrone =

Italian equestrian and politician (1871–1923)

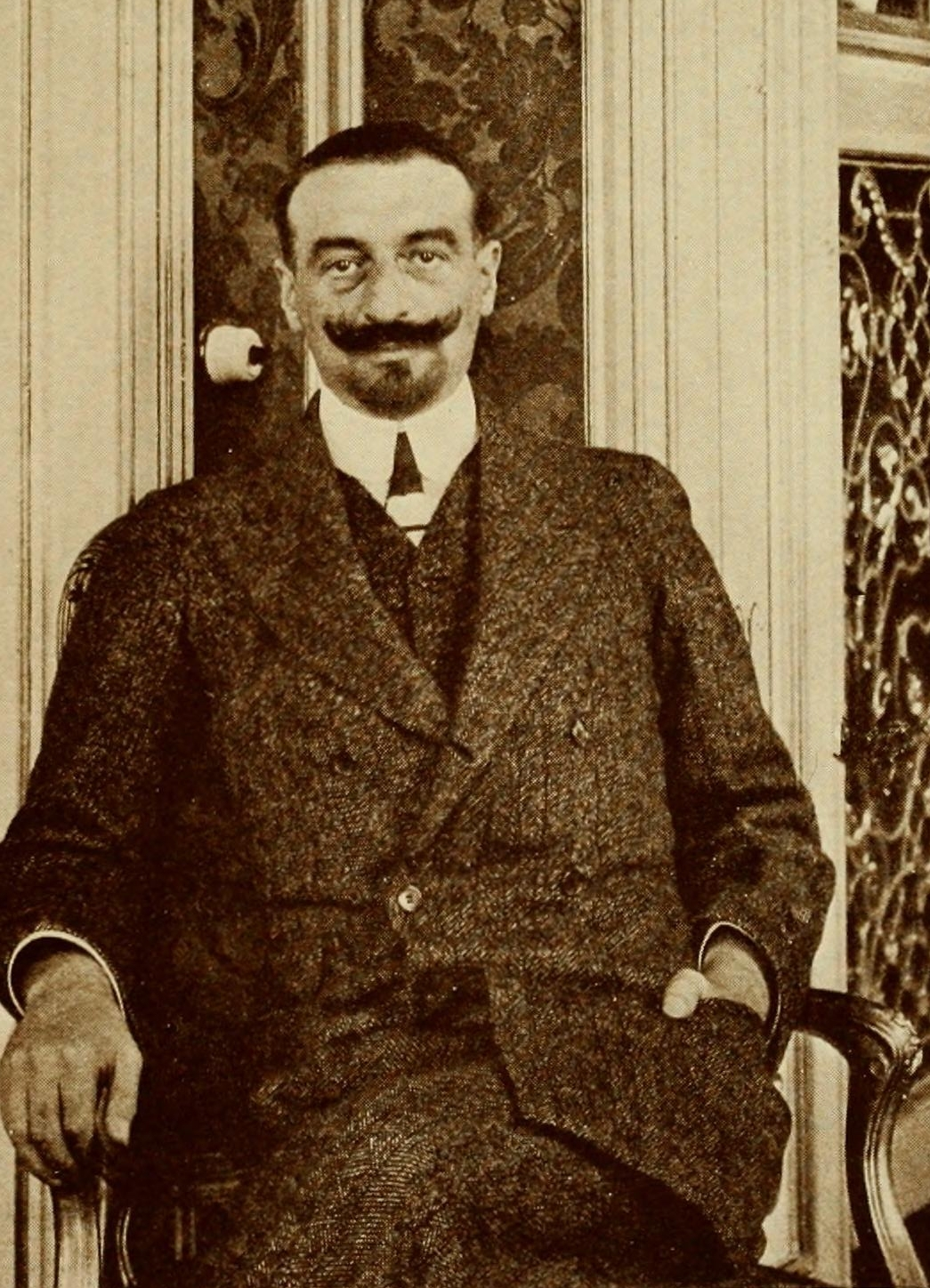

Personal information
- Nationality: Italian
- Born: 23 February 1871 Milan, Italy
- Died: 13 January 1923 (aged 51) Milan, Italy

Sport
- Sport: Equestrian

Uberto Visconti di Modrone (23 February 1871 – 13 January 1923) was an Italian equestrian and politician. He competed in the equestrian long jump event at the 1900 Summer Olympics. He was a member of the Senate of the Kingdom of Italy from 24 November 1913 until his death on 13 January 1923. He was also a Milan city councilor and the mayor of Macherio.
