= Charles Amberger =

French cyclist

- Born: 9 January 1882; Paris, France
- Died: 2 May 1901 (aged 19); Paris, France

Charles Henri Adrien Amberger (9 January 1882 – 2 May 1901) was a French cyclist. He competed at the 1900 Summer Olympics in the men's sprint. He did not finish in the third heat of the first round.
