= Albert Taillandier =

French cyclist

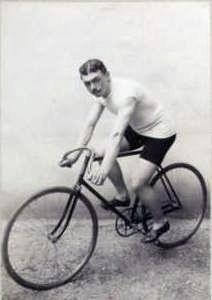
- Taillandier in 1900

Personal information
- Full name: Albert Philippe Taillandier
- Born: 8 February 1879 Paris, France
- Died: 27 July 1945 (aged 66) Auzances, France

Cycling career
- Sport: Cycling
Medal record
Men's track cycling
Representing France
Olympic Games
Gold medal – first place	1900 Paris	Men's sprint

Albert Philippe Taillandier (8 February 1879 in Paris – 27 July 1945 in Auzances) was a French racing cyclist who competed in the late 19th century and early 20th century. He participated in cycling at the 1900 Summer Olympics in Paris and won the gold medal in the men's sprint.
