= Antonio Restelli =

Italian cyclist

Personal information
- Born: 6 January 1877
- Died: 11 March 1945 (aged 68) Milan, Italy

Cycling career
- Sport: Cycling

Antonio Restelli (6 January 1877 – 11 March 1945) was an Italian cyclist. He competed in the men's sprint event at the 1900 Summer Olympics.
