= Paul Gottron =

German cyclist

Personal information
- Full name: Paul Gottron

Cycling career
- Sport: Cycling

Paul Gottron was a German cyclist. He competed in the men's sprint event at the 1900 Summer Olympics.
