= Dutertre =

Dutertre or Du Tertre is a French surname. Notable people with the surname include:

- André Dutertre, French painter
- Jean-Baptiste Du Tertre (1610–1687), French monk
- Jean-Marie Dutertre (1768–1811), French pirate
- Jean-François Dutertre, French musician, member of the Mélusine group
- Estienne du Tertre, French composer
