= Estienne du Tertre =

French composer

Estienne du Tertre (fl. mid-16th century) was a French composer. He spent most of his life in Paris and worked as an editor for the publisher Attaingnant, notably succeeding Claude Gervaise as the editor of Attaignant's collections of Danseries: he was responsible for seventh volume of this series which appeared in 1557. He is the first editor to use the term suytte (suite) for collections of Bransles. In addition to his work with Attaignant, he is the author of fifty-seven complete and fourteen fragmentary published chansons which appeared between 1543 and 1568 largely in collections published by Attaignant and Nicolas du Chemin. There are also twenty five of his songs that use the same texts as songs by Clément Janequin.

== Bibliography ==
- C. Cunningham, Étienne du Tertre and the mid-xvith Century Parisian chanson, Musica Disciplina, 1971.
