= Karl Duill =

German cyclist

Personal information
- Full name: Karl Duill

Cycling career
- Sport: Cycling

Karl Duill was a German cyclist. He competed in the men's sprint event at the 1900 Summer Olympics.
