= Enrico Brusoni =

Italian cyclist (1878–1949)

Personal information
- Full name: Ernesto Mario "Enrico" Brusoni
- Born: 10 December 1878 Arezzo, Kingdom of Italy
- Died: 26 November 1949 (aged 70) Bergamo, Italy

Cycling career
- Sport: Cycling
Medal record
Representing Italy
Men's cycling
Olympic Games
Gold medal – first place	1900 Paris	Points Race

Enrico Brusoni (10 December 1878 – 26 November 1949) was an Italian cyclist.

== Biography ==
He won the Olympic gold medal at the 1900 Summer Olympics in the Points Race, this medal is not recognized by International Olympic Committee, but is recognized by Italian National Olympic Committee.

== See also ==
- Italy at the 1900 Summer Olympics
