= Ce soir =

Defunct French political newspaper

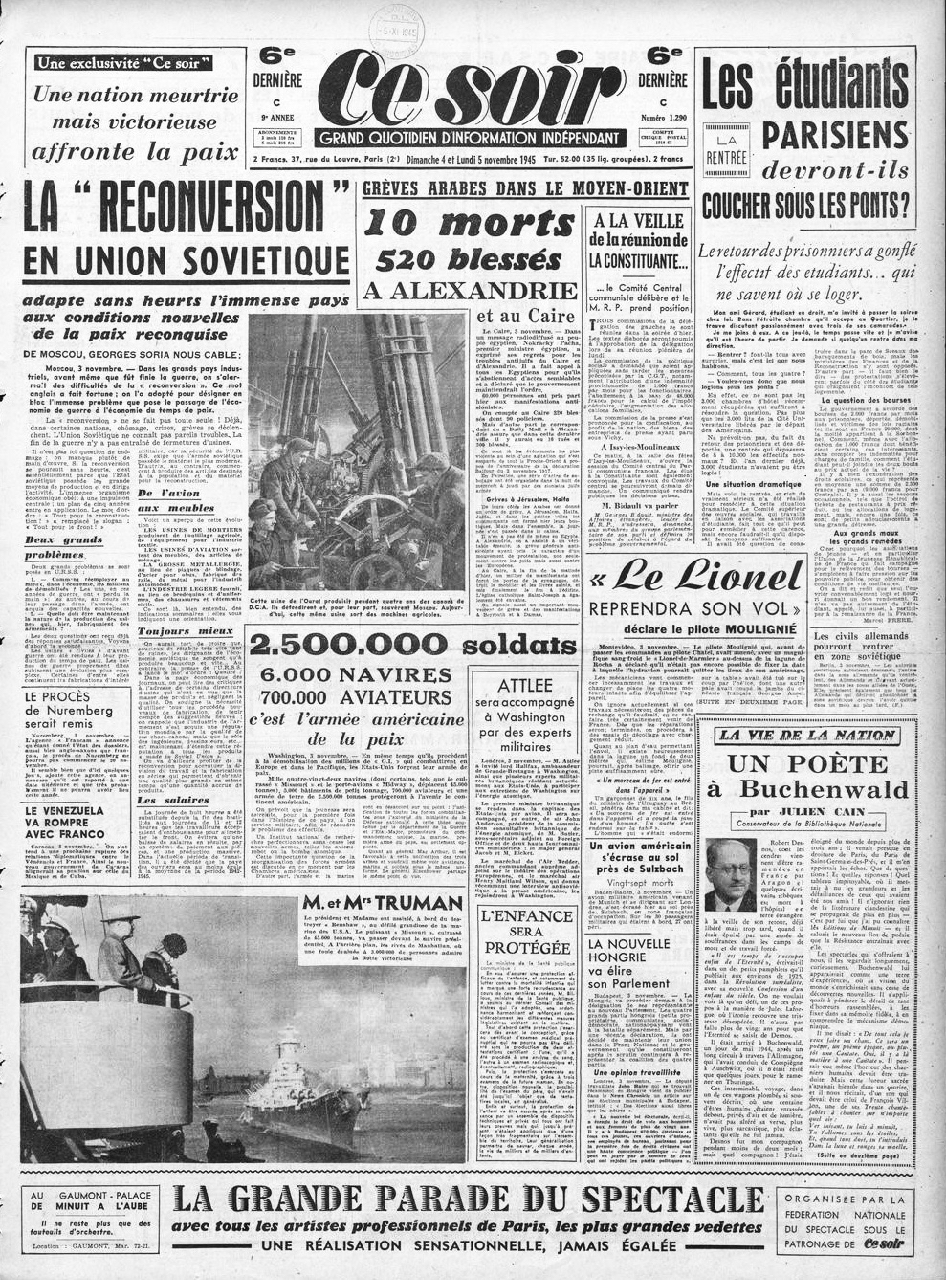
- Type: Daily
- Founder: French Communist Party
- Founded: 1 March 1937
- Ceased publication: 28 February 1953
- Political alignment: Left-wing
- Language: French
- Headquarters: Paris
- Circulation: 260,000 (1939)

Ce soir (English: "Tonight"), was a French daily newspaper founded by the French Communist Party and directed by Louis Aragon and Jean-Richard Bloch.

== History ==
The newspaper was established on the initiative of the Communist Party general secretary Maurice Thorez in order to compete with Paris-soir. The first issue was released on 1 March 1937. The newspaper was under the direction of two famous writers, Louis Aragon who is already known for his membership in the Communist Party became director of the newly established newspaper and Jean-Richard Bloch who was a very close sympathizer of the PCF and will eventually join the party in 1939 became co-director.

Although Ce soir never managed to reach the Paris soir prints, it managed to reach a circulation of 260,000 by March 1939.

Among the famous contributors to the newspaper were René Arcos, Julien Benda, Jean Blanzat, Jean Cocteau, Lise Deharme, Robert Desnos, Luc Durtain, Yvette Guilbert, Francis Jourdain, André Lhote, Darius Milhaud, Georges Pillement, Tristan Rémy, Jean Renoir, Georges Sadoul, Elsa Triolet, Jean Wiener. Well known professional editors of the newspaper were Édith Thomas, Simone Téry and Andrée Viollis.

The Spanish Civil War was covered by eighteen journalists and reporter-photographers. The big names in left-wing journalism follow one another to describe and illustrate the struggles on the Republican faction. Among them were Édith Thomas, Andrée Viollis, Simone Téry, already mentioned and Louis Parrot, Stéphane Manier, Georges Soria, Renaud de Jouvenel.

Special Envoys of Ce soir were photographers who would later become famous for their coverage of the Spanish Civil War, Gerda Taro, who was killed in the Battle of Brunete in July 1937, Robert Capa and Chim, aka David Seymour.

The newspaper which was considered to be an organ of the French Communist Party the daily was banned on 25 August by French authorities in 1939, along with L'Humanité and all of the party's publications because they were suspected of supporting Molotov–Ribbentrop Pact.

The newspaper did not officially resume publication until 1944 under the editorship of Louis Parrot who was a pre-war editor of the newspaper. Louis Aragon re-assumed the position of director of the newspaper. He was succeeded by Bloch, however after his death in 1947 Aragon became the sole director of the newspaper.

After the eviction of Communist ministers and the beginnings of the Cold War, gradually there was a call into questioning the existence of the newspaper, whose administration was similar with that of L'Humanité. In 1947, the headquarters of the two newspapers were united in the same building. The daily, which lost its autonomy, was then caught in a spiral of decline. On 28 February 1953 the newspaper ceased publication.

== Chief editors ==
- Elie Richard (1937–1939)
- Louis Parrot (1944)
- Gilbert Badia (1945–1949)
- André Stil (1949–1950)
