= Chabas =

Chabas is a surname. Notable people with the surname include:

- François Chabas (1817–1882), French Egyptologist
- Juan Chabás (1910–1954), Spanish-born poet and writer
- Maurice Chabas (1862–1947), French Symbolist painter
- Paul Émile Chabas (1869–1937), French painter and illustrator and member of the Académie des Beaux-Arts
