= Charles Picart Le Doux =

French painter

- Born: Charles Alexandre Picart Le Doux; 12 July 1881; Paris, France
- Died: 11 September 1959 (aged 78); Paris, France
- Education: Académie Julian, Marcel Baschet; Beaux-Arts de Paris
- Works: Misia, nu au châle jaune et bleu, 1908; La Touraine, 1945; illustrations for the book series Oeuvres de Balzac sur la Touraine, 1946-1947
- Awards: Chevalier of the Legion of Honor, 1950

Signature
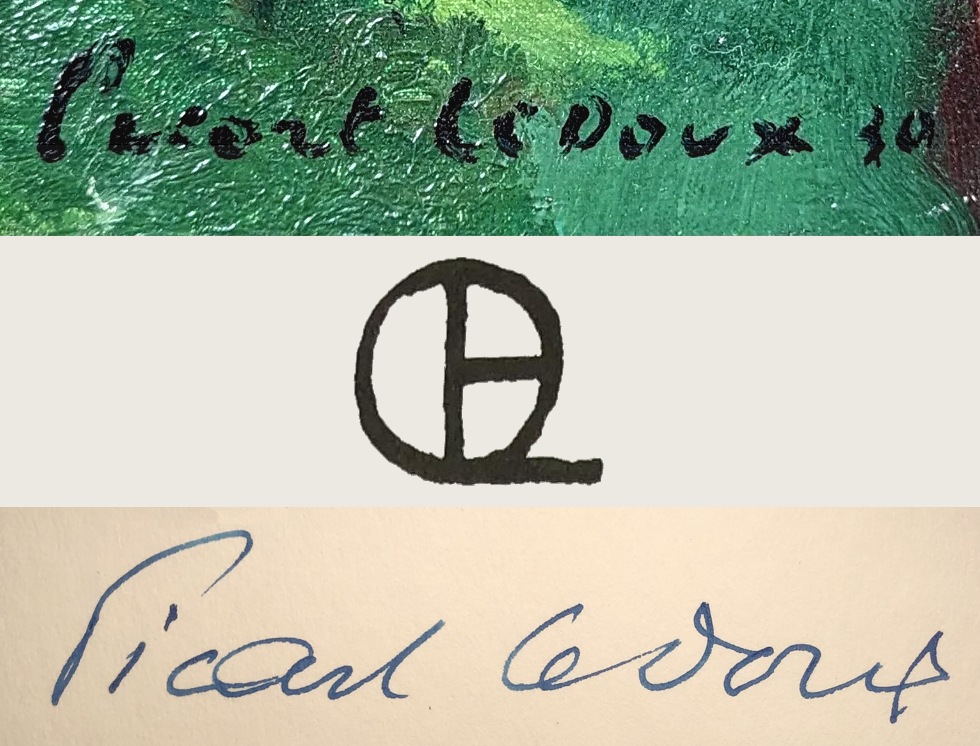

Charles Alexandre Picart Le Doux (July 12, 1881—September 11, 1959) was a French painter, engraver, book illustrator, poet and author. He was part of the artistic milieu of Montmartre in the years before World War I, and active in the circle of Jules Romains and the Abbaye de Créteil group of artists and writers. A celebration of his work, the book Picart Le Doux, was published in 1945, and in 1950 he was made a Chevalier of the Legion of Honor. He was born and died in the 14th arrondissement of Paris. His son Jean Picart Le Doux (1902–1982) also became a notable artist.

== Family and education ==
He descended from a Parisian family whose genealogy has been traced to the birth on February 29, 1744, of Louis Picart Ledoux, first commander of the firefighters of Paris. His grandfather was a glass painter, Louis Charles Auguste Picart Le Doux, who executed the south rose window of Notre-Dame de Paris. It was he who first taught young Charles to draw.

He studied at the Lycée Janson-de-Sailly before committing to an artistic career, first taking courses at the Académie Julian under Marcel Baschet, then at the Beaux-Arts de Paris in Saint-Germain-des-Prés until 1902, when he moved to Montmartre. In his memoir Monelle de Montrmatre (1953) he wrote,

Not satisfied by the teaching, practically nil, at the École des Beaux-Arts, I spent hours of pictorial incubation in the Durand-Ruel gallery. I discovered Manet, Monet, Renoir, Cézanne, Pissaro. I had the revelation that painting should be "the expression of life."

== Artistic milieu of Montmartre and early career ==
In Montmartre, Picart Le Doux frequented the Lapin Agile cabaret, where he met and became close friends with Suzanne Valadon and her son Maurice Utrillo, only two years his junior but whom Picart Le Doux recalled as "very young then, seeming to live on the margins of life."

Among his wide circle of friends and colleagues in pre-World War I Montmartre were many writers and fellow artists. In his memoir, Picart Le Doux mentions Maurice Asselin, George Bottini, Charles Camoin, Ricciotto Canudo, Francis Carco, Gaston Couté, Andre Deslignières, Guus van Dongen, Roland Dorgelès, Maurice-Edme Drouard, Yvonne George, Max Jacob, Pierre Mac Orlan, Albert Marquet, Henri Matisse, Alexandre Mercereau, Fernand Piet, Pablo Picasso, Ludovic-Rodo Pissarro, Maurice Princet, Paul Reboux, Georges Ribemont-Dessaignes, and Félix Vallotton.

He was friends with the Olympic silver medalist in sailing, Jacques Doucet, and mourned his death after World War I. He went sailing in Le Havre with the artist and Olympic sailing competitor G. Pigeard, and at Pigeard's studio in Montmartre "made imaginary journeys in his little Chinese room, after smoking a few pipes of opium."

He also forged enduring friendships with René Arcos, Charles Vildrac, Georges Duhamel, Conrad Kickert, and Jules Romains, moving in the circle of the Abbaye de Créteil group of artists and writers.

Picart Le Doux first exhibited in Paris at the Salon des Indépendants in 1904, and later at the Salon de la Société Nationale des Beaux-Arts, the Salon des Tuileries, and the Salon d’Automne, of which he became a member. His first one-man exhibition was at the Paris gallery of Eugéne Blot, in 1910. He also exhibited at the gallery of Charles Vildrac at 11 rue de Seine.

In 1913, Picart Le Doux participated in the mock election of the fou littéraire (literary lunatic) Jean-Pierre Brisset as the "Prince of Thinkers," a hoax engineered by Jules Romains that culminated with a procession, speeches, and a banquet at the Hôtel des sociétés savantes (Paris) celebrating the eccentric Brisset, then in his seventies. Brisset died in 1919, but Romains continued to organize an annual dinner in honor of the "Prince" until 1939.

At the time World War I began, Picart Le Doux was living on Rue Gabrielle, across from Max Jacob, with a view of Sacré-Cœur.

== World War I ==
The halcyon days of Montmartre came to an abrupt end with the onset of World War I. "As an unrepentant pacifist," Picart Le Doux regarded the escalating hostilities of 1914 with "disgust" and "repulsion. Collective madness had, like a cancer, invaded the most lucid minds, the best hearts."

On August 2, the day Germany occupied Luxembourg and exchanged fire with French units, he wandered through Paris, horrified at the celebrations in the streets. Even

Montmartre, once so welcoming, had lost its raison d'être, its childish and picturesque soul. I stopped at the terrace of the Cyrano in Place Blanche. The dense crowds were exuberant with joy, all shouting: "To Berlin! To Berlin!"…Weary, I went down the Rue Pigalle. I walked into one of those shady bars reserved for inverts. These, I thought, must fear violence. This was not the case. Although most of these gentlemen were dressed in feminine garments, they too wanted to fight: "To Berlin!"

Quickly drafted into the French army, he paid a last visit to his studio, "which I thought I would never see again," and slipped into his pocket his copy of Rimbaud's Les Illuminations, the book he deemed "the most apt to console me for the stupidity of men. It was to be my companion for the next four years."

Chance, circumstances, a favorable destiny—how should I know?—caused me to be assigned as a medic to a divisional ambulance.…We didn't know anything about our jobs as medics when, suddenly, we saw the wounded arriving. Light injuries at first, one by one, from time to time, then the pace quickened, intensified, and a few hours later we were submerged. We didn't know what to do.

In his role as a medic, for four years Picart Le Doux daily witnessed the worst suffering and death imaginable; amid "the sickening smell of filth and bloody juice oozing from the blotter of bandages," he was often the last person to whom a dying man spoke. "After the last shot of morphine, the remnant of what had been a man…begged me to write to his wife, to his children. It was necessary to reassure them…I promised everything…then I hid to cry."

The experience was shattering. "Men failed to take my life, but they killed my soul and bruised my heart forever."

== After World War I ==
In 1921, he met the painter and sculptor Aristide Maillol, who remained a close friend until Maillol's death in 1944. Picart Le Doux recounted their friendship in an article published in 1950.

In 1937, he was awarded the Grande Médaille at the Exposition Internationale in Paris.

Picart Le Doux saw the approach of World War II with dread.

This new war was a bad movie I had already seen, but even more stupid, more hackneyed. It was not a war but a cascade of interlocking wars. Business war, religious war, political war, war of conquest, stupid war of people made rotten by venality, love of gold, of domination!…Survival was about narrowly avoiding being shot by costumed killers, paid killers, and volunteer killers."

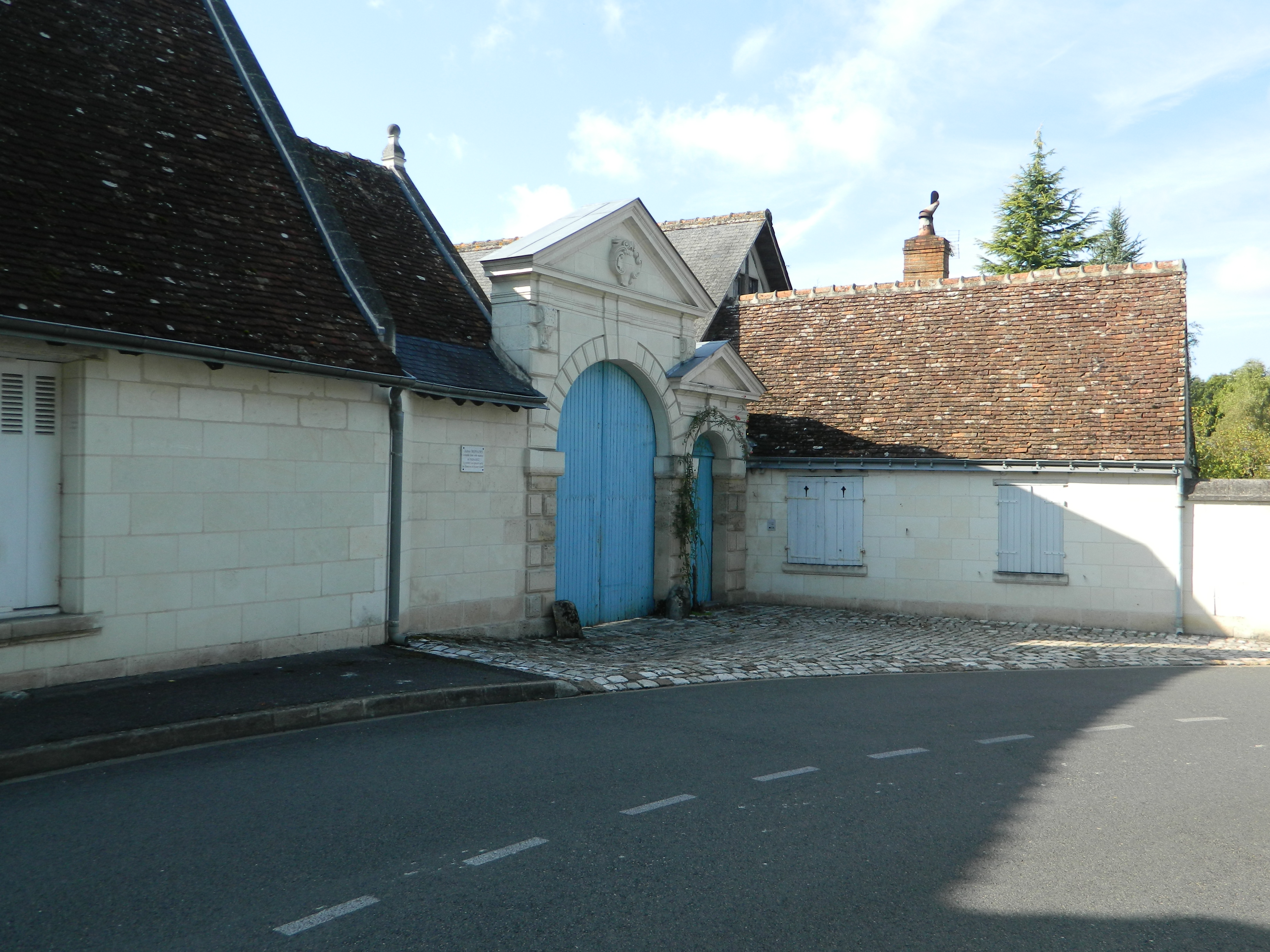
The Manoir de la Grand'Cour, home of Jules Romains, where Picart Le Doux found refuge in 1939.

Anticipating the German invasion of Poland in 1939, and seeking a safe haven, Picart Le Doux left Paris with his wife and daughter and moved to Touraine. On September 1, Jules Romains welcomed them to his home in Saint-Avertin, the Manoir de la Grand'Cour, where Picart Le Doux set up an atelier in the orangery. In their memoirs, both Romains and his wife Lise reflected fondly on this period of shared refuge. Romains wrote: "Thanks to them, I have kept from that winter, still at peace but imbued with a dull anguish, a memory of friendship, fantasy, and grace that helped create an atmosphere that was still breathable." In spring of 1940 Picart Le Doux and his family left Grandcour "and rented a house nearby. They spent the entire period of the Occupation in Touraine."

On July 26, 1944, the Provisional Government of the French Republic commissioned Picart Le Doux to paint an oil on canvas mounted on panel, 6 meters high and 3.4 meters wide, representing an allegory of the Loire Valley. The river, personified as a nude woman, is accompanied by a woman dressed in a traditional costume, with images of the local landscape and architecture to either side, in a composition inspired by 16th-century tapestries. The artist captioned his work with a rhyming couplet: "Loire a la chair de lys, fille noble et rebelle/ainsi le doux fardeau vint l'echoir d'etre belle." The work can still be seen in the billiard room of the Préfecture d’Indre-et-Loire in Tours.

After the war, Picart Le Doux returned to Paris to his home at the end of a courtyard at 40, rue Boissonade, described by Romains as "a small one-story house, the main room of which was a large atelier. The whole place was full of poetry."

The aftermath of the world war left him utterly dispirited.

"The modern world had become poisoned, the air unbreathable, yet this was the world I had to live in, this was the air I had to breathe! Like a beleaguered beast, the dreamer, the misfit, the one who did not want to belong to anything or anyone was pursued by a merciless social pack. I tried to slip through the cracks of that dark net, to occupy my modest parcel of a moral No Man's Land, and to suppress my resentments. With age I managed to look at life with indulgence. Men deserved pity, my duty was to give them my tenderness. Who was I to judge them?

At the same time, a high point of his career came with the publication in 1945 of the book Picart Le Doux, which presented reproductions of many of his works, and collected essays on the artist by thirteen writers published over thirty-five years, from Yvanhoé Rambosson in 1910 to Luc Durtain in 1945. The book also included a selection of aphorisms by Picart Le Doux, among them, "A revolutionary painting is not necessarily a revolting painting"; and, "The tragedy of modern life is not the harshness of the struggle, but its mediocrity."

In 1950, he was named a Chevalier of the Legion of Honor.

In the last decade of his life, Picart Le Doux became a published author. His works included an essay about his late friend Aristide Maillol (1950), a memoir, Monelle de Montmartre (1953), and two books of poetry, Discrédit (1956) and Nacres, thrènes et poèmes (1959).

Picart Le Doux died on September 11, 1959, in Paris.

== Works ==
Picart Le Doux painted self-portraits, portraits of family and notable friends, still lifes, impressionistic landscapes, and murals. He was also, for more than four decades, a prolific illustrator of books.

Critics noted that his forte was the female nude. Louis Vauxcelles wrote, "His nudes, of a direct and dazzling frankness, testify, in addition to a virtuosity of execution...to the reasoned admiration that the artist has for his true master, Manet." Georges Duhamel wrote, "What I like most about painting is the human figure…he offers it to us, all historical contingencies abolished, in its aspect of eternity, in its animal and divine purity at the same time."

In 1905, he painted a portrait of the prominent art patron Misia Sert, and in 1908 he painted Sert reclining in the nude.

Among his large commissions were six plafonds for the dining room of the ocean liner SS Normandie, and walls of the dining hall of the Lycée du Cours de Vincennes, of the Lycée Hélène Boucher in Paris, and of the Mairie (town hall) of the 14th arrondissement, the precinct of Paris where he was born and died.

== Teaching ==
Picart Le Doux taught drawing at the Académie de la Grande Chaumière from 1927 until 1959. From 1945 he was a professor at the Académie Colarossi. His students included Yvette Alde, Madeleine Bailliat, Pauline Boutal, and Harriette Miller.

== Personal life ==
He married young and had two sons from his first marriage, Yves Picart Le Doux, a painter, and Jean Picart Le Doux (1902–1982), a designer of ceramics and "one of the foremost figures in the renaissance of the art of tapestry," whose fame eclipsed that of his father. In 1970, Jules Romains wrote, "Nothing annoys me and pains me more than hearing people talk about him [Jean] as if he were the only Picart Le Doux, as if there had not been another before him. And I very much fear that Jean Picart Le Doux—may he forgive me if I am unjust—will do nothing to dispel this misunderstanding."

Picart Le Doux's second wife, Marcelle, was about fifteen years younger than him, and was remembered by Lise Jules-Romains as "a colorful woman brimming with vitality…beautiful, in a rather old-fashioned style and slightly overweight." Picart Le Doux painted her numerous times, as he did their daughter, Jacqueline. The three were known to friends as Pic, Piquette, and Picou, or collectively, les trois Pic.

== Legacy ==
According to Jules Romains, writing in 1970,

"Picart Le Doux never betrayed what he rightly considered to be good and true painting. He refused to follow fashion. This obviously hindered his success. Another cause of the semi-obscurity in which he ended his life was his refusal to subjugate himself to an art dealer. This refusal was motivated by reasons that were all to his credit. But, whether we deplore it or not, the role of the art dealer in the success of a painter is too important not to regret that Picart Le Doux did not have, in this regard at least, a more complacent character. I think the times are especially unfair to him."

Writing in 1985, Lise Jules-Romains said of Picart Le Doux, "Posterity has so far been quite cruel to him. Perhaps she will be more lenient in the future and will rediscover him. We will then realize that he was a painter of great talent."

== In museums and public collections ==
=== Paris ===
- Maternité, 1927; Femmes au repos, 1927; Cherbourg, by 1939; Musée National d'Art Moderne, Centre Pompidou.
- Bord de rivière, 1931; Saint-Rémy en Provence, 1954, Musée d'Art Moderne de Paris.
- Aups, 1934, Les poètes chez le peintre, 1949; Le Revest, 1950, Centre national des arts plastiques.
- Fleurs, by 1931, Grande Chancellerie de la Légion d'Honneur.
- Le Lac Daumesnil et son temple d'amour, 1937, Lycée Hélène Boucher.
- Femme nue, by 1939, Maison Internationale des P.E.N. Clubs.
- Le Cher à Tours, by 1947, Ministère de l'Économie, des Finances et de l'Industrie.

=== Tours ===
- L'île Simon, à Tours, 1941; La Loire à Tours, by 1942, Musée des beaux-arts de Tours.
- Ruines de l'église des jésuites et de l'hôtel de Beaune, 1941; La Touraine, 1945, Préfecture de l'Indre-et-Loire.

=== Elsewhere in France ===
- Vase des fleurs, 1919, Musée des Beaux-Arts, palais Carnolès, Menton.
- La fermière au lapin, 1935, Musée Pierre-Noël de Saint-Dié-des-Vosges.
- La rue Nationale à Tours en 1940, 1940, Musée de la Guerre, Vincennes.
- Le port de Cherbourg, 1948, Mairie de Ploubalay.
- La Barque Bleu, 1957, Musée des beaux-arts de Troyes.
- Paysage, Musée des Avelines, Saint-Cloud.

=== Senegal ===
- Sainte-Victoire, 1951, French Embassy, Dakar.

=== England ===
- Untitled drawing (village of Lavardin, Loir-et-Cher), British Museum, London.
- Portrait of Somerset Maugham, Simon Carter Gallery, Woodbridge, Suffolk.

=== Russia ===
- Paysage à Saint-Denis, by 1928, Hermitage Museum, St. Petersburg; previously in the collection of the State Museum of Modern Western Art, Moscow.

The book Picart Le Doux, published in 1945, indicates that at that time works by the artist were also in museums in Algiers, Bagnols-sur-Cèze, Casablanca, The Hague, Monaco, Nice, and Saint-Quentin.

== At auction ==
In 2023, the auction house of Christophe Joron-Derem held an extensive auction of works by Picart Le Doux at Hôtel Drouot in Paris. More than 150 lots included paintings, watercolors, drawings, and illustrated books, with subjects ranging from landscapes, portraits and self-portraits to nudes and erotic drawings. Lot number 28, his 1908 nude portrait of Misia Sert, set a 21st-century auction record for the artist, EUR 11,960 (including fees).

== Books illustrated by Picart Le Doux ==
- Les Quatre Saisons by Jules Romains, folio, single print run of 103 copies, c. 1916.
- Le Bourgmestre de Stilmonde by Maurice Maeterlinck, illustré with trente bois dessinés et gravés, Paris, 1919.
- Livre d'amour by Charles Vildrac, Paris, 1920.
- L'illustre magicien by Arthur de Gobineau, Léon Pichon, 1920.
- Un document sur l'Impuissance d'Aimer suivi de Erythrée by Jean de Tinan, avec 10 bois dessinés et gravés par Picart Le Doux, Paris: Edouard-Joseph, 1920.
- Romances sans paroles by Paul Verlaine, Paris: Librairie Albert Messein, 1920.
- Le Chambre éclairée by Colette, Paris: Edouard-Joseph, 1920.
- Jean sans pain, histoire pour tous les enfants by Paul Vaillant-Couturier, 1921.
- Histoire de Douce-Amie: conte des mille et une nuits by Joseph-Charles Mardrus, Paris: René Kieffer, 1922.
- Kir Nicolas; Codine by Panait Istrati, bois en coleurs dessinés et gravés by Picart Ledoux, Paris, 1926.
- Le prince Jaffar by Georges Duhamel, Paris: René Kieffer, 1926.
- The Branch of the Hawthorne Tree by Monk Gibbon, color designs by Picart Le Doux, London, 1927.
- La Maison de Septembre by Luc Durtain, Paris, 1928.
- Œuvres complètes illustrées by Alphonse Daudet, Paris: Librairie de France, 1929–1931.
- Les Fleurs du mal; Pièces condamnées by Charles Baudelaire, illustré by dessins au lavis, Paris, 1931.
- Bridinette by Charles Vildrac, Paris, 1935.
- Jeunesse du Ciel by P.M. Fontaine, Tourangelle, 1940.
- Ceux de Touraine, et des pays de Loire, types et coutumes by Jacques-Marie Rougé, dessins originaux by Picart Le Doux, Paris, 1941.
- La Touraine de Balzac by Albert Arrault, illustré by Picart Le Doux, Tours: Arrault et Cie, 1943.
- Poésies Livre mystique-livre antique by Alfred de Vigny, Tours: Les Iles de Loire, 1944.
- Les Oeuvres de Maistre François Villon, Paris: Les Editions Nationales, 1945.
- Colomba by Prosper Mérimée, with thirty illustrations by Picart Le Doux, Nice: L'Image Littéraire, 1946.
- La comédie humaine. IV. Les martyrs ignorés by Honoré de Balzac, Oeuvres de Balzac sur la Touraine, Tours: Arrault et Cie, 1946.
- Le rendez-vous (la femme de trente ans) by Honoré de Balzac, Oeuvres de Balzac sur la Touraine, Tours: Arrault et Cie, 1946.
- La Grenadiere by Honoré de Balzac, Oeuvres de Balzac sur la Touraine, Tours: Arrault et Cie, 1946.
- Histoire de Jane la Pâle by Honoré de Balzac, Oeuvres de Balzac sur la Touraine, Tours: Arrault et Cie, Tours, 1947.
- Le Lys dans la vallée by Honoré de Balzac, Oeuvres de Balzac sur la Touraine, Tours: Arrault et Cie, 1947.
- L'illustre Gaudissart by Honoré de Balzac, Oeuvres de Balzac sur la Touraine, Tours: Arrault et Cie, 1947.
- Histoire de Jane la Pâle by Honoré de Balzac, Oeuvres de Balzac sur la Touraine, Tours: Arrault et Cie, 1947.
- Eugénie Grandet by Honoré de Balzac, Oeuvres de Balzac sur la Touraine, Tours: Arrault et Cie, 1947.
- L'Écharpe de suie by Pierre Mac Orlan, illustrated with six original watercolors, Paris: Editions de la Couronne, 1947.
- Vie des Martyrs. by Georges Duhamel, Albert Guillot, 1948.
- Chronique des Pasquier [5.], Le Désert de Bièvres by Georges Duhamel, Paris, 1951.
- Gagneuses! Chronique de l'Amour vénal à Paris by Sylvain Bonmariage, Paris: Le Clé d'or, 1951.
- Les personnages de minuit: roman by Madeleine Berry, Saint-Vaast-la-Hougue (Manche): L'Amitié par le Livre, 1953.
- Botafogo, une cité ouvriere by Aluizio de Azevedo, translated by Henry Grunet, Paris: Club Bibliophile de France, 1953.
- Civilisation: 1914-1917 by Georges Duhamel, Paris, 1954.
- Œdipe en colère by Jean Variot, illustré de pointes sèches, Paris: les Amis du livre moderne, 1955.
- Histoire d'âne pauvre et de cochon gras by Paul Vaillant-Couturier, éditions La Farandole, 1956.
- Paul Métadier (1872-1956), commemorative booklet in honor of the former mayor of Royan, including color portrait by Picart Le Doux, 1957.
- Escales d'automne by Fernand Chaffiol-Debillemont; frontispice by Charles Picart Le Doux, 1958.
- Valparaiso, Port de Nostalgie by Salvador Reyes, translated by Francis de Miomandre, Paris: Au Moulin de Pen-Mur, n.d.

== Bibliography, including books by Picart Le Doux ==
- Bénézit, E., et al. "Picart Le Doux, Charles Alexandre" entry (pp. 1357-1358) in Dictionary of Artists, vol. 10, Gründ, 2006.
- Jules-Romains, Lise. Les vies inimitables: souvenirs, Paris: Flammarion, 1985.
- Picart Le Doux, exhibition catalogue, Galerie Eugène Blot, Paris, 1910.
- Picart de Doux, Charles (1950). "Aristide Maillol," Le Courrier des arts et des lettres, January 16, 1950.
- Picart Le Doux, Charles (1953). Monelle de Montmartre, preface by Pierre Mac Orlan, illustrations by the author, Paris, 1953.
- Picart Le Doux, Charles (1956). Discrédit (poems), Michel Brient, 1956.
- Picart Le Doux, Charles (1959). Nacres, thrènes et poèmes, Paris, 1959.
- Rambosson, Yvanhoé, et. at. Picart Le Doux, Paris, O. Zeluck, 1945.
- Romains, Jules. Amitiés et Rencontres, Paris: Flammarion, 1970.
