= Roland Mahé =

Canadian theatre director

Roland François Mahé
- Born: May 1, 1940 (age 86); St. Boniface, Manitoba
- Awards: Order of Canada

Roland François Mahé CM OM (born May 1, 1940) is a Canadian theatre director from Winnipeg, Manitoba, who led Le Cercle Molière for 44 years from 1968 to 2012.

Mahé was born in St. Boniface, Manitoba, in 1940 and joined Le Cercle Molière in 1960, taking over leadership in 1968 upon the retirement of director Pauline Boutal. Mahé was made a member of the order of Canada in 2017.
