= André Stil =

French writer (1921–2004)

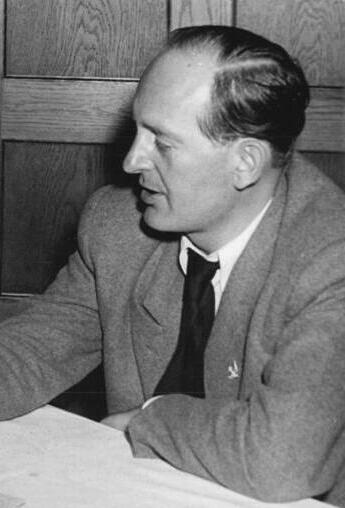
- Stil in 1952
- Born: 1 April 1921; Hergnies, France
- Died: 3 September 2004 (aged 83); Camélas, France
- Occupation: Author
- Writing career
- Period: 1949–1996
- Genre: Fiction
- Literary movement: Socialist realism

André Stil (1 April 1921 – 3 September 2004) was a French novelist, short story writer, occasional poet, and political activist. A lifelong militant, he became a member of the French Communist Party in 1940, and remained loyal to the party.

== Life ==
Born in Hergnies, Nord, a small town in the coal-mining region of northern France, Stil was educated at the University of Lille, earning a degree in philosophy. He taught at the University from 1941 to 1944. Having joined the Communist Party in 1940, he then held a series of increasingly senior editorial positions with communist newspapers. He was secretary-general of Liberté until 1949, then editor-in-chief of Ce soir. He served as editor of the party's main newspaper, L'Humanité, until 1956, continuing to contribute thereafter, and from 1950 to 1970 he was a member of the French Communist Party's central committee.

Beginning in 1949, he published some fifty volumes, comprising mainly socialist realist novels, but also short stories and a volume of verse. Supported by Louis Aragon, he won the Stalin Prize for his trilogy The First Clash (1951–1953). He won the Grand Prix du Roman Populaire, was awarded the Legion d'Honneur, and in 1977 was elected one of the ten members of the Academie Goncourt.

In 1956 he published a report from the Hungarian Revolution, describing an apparent mass murder of Hungarian communists. However Peter Fryer, a British journalist and Marxist who, unlike Stil was present during the revolution and Soviet crackdown, questioned Stil's account arguing that "Stil [was] obviously performing the disagreeable task of a propagandist making the most of a small number of atrocities." Indeed, Fryer refuted Stil's account pointing out that those killed were in fact members of the hated AVH secret police.

Stil was arrested for "inciting ... public demonstrations, armed or otherwise", "provocation to violence" and "conspiring against France’s military security" This was the result of stories he had written about, among other things, American General Matthew Ridgway and allegations "that the US had engaged in bacteriological warfare in Korea." Although he was held in Fresnes Prison awaiting trial, he was eventually released without charge.

== Works ==
His first novel, The Word `Coalminer', Comrade (1949) launched his enduring themes of working class life and militant communist politics. This was followed by a short story collection, The Seine has Taken to the Sea (1950) and his prize-winning trilogy The First Clash (1951–1953). This tells the story of the resistance of dock workers to the arrival of an American arms ship and contains detailed accounts of domestic working-class life. Anti-Americanism and the French-Algerian problem were important themes in his work through the 1950s. He returned to his coal-mining background repeatedly in his fiction; one of his last novels was Coal Dust on the Snow (1996). In addition to his prolific fiction, he wrote a critical work, Towards Socialist Realism, and an autobiography, A Life Spent Writing. He also wrote scripts for television.

=== List of works ===
- Au mot amour
- Beau comme un homme
- Bélesta
- Conte du premier œuf
- De eerste stoot 3 dedlen
- Dieu est un enfant
- Fleurs par erreur
- Gazelle
- La neige fumée
- La question du bonneur est posée 1- le blé égyptien
- L'ami dans le miroir
- Le Médecin de charme
- L'autre monde, etc.
- L'Homme de cœur
- L'homme fleur
- Le foudroyage
- Le médecin de charme
- Le mot mineur camarades ...
- Le Mouvement de la terre
- Le roman de Constance
- Le premier choc - au château d'eau
- Les oiseaux migrateurs
- Les Quartiers d'été
- Malaguanyat
- Maxime et Anne
- Nous nous aimerons demain
- Paris avec nous le premier choc
- Pêche à la plume
- Pierwski starcie 2 volume
- Pignon sur ciel
- Quand Robespierre et Danton inventaient la France
- Qui ?
- Romansonge
- Soixante-quatre coquelicots
- Une histoire pour chaque matin
- Une vie à écrire
