= Illuminations (poetry collection) =

Uncompleted collection of prose poems by Arthur Rimbaud

Illuminations is an incomplete suite of prose poems by the French poet Arthur Rimbaud, first published partially in La Vogue, a Paris literary review, in May–June 1886. The texts were reprinted in book form in October 1886 by Les publications de La Vogue under the title Les Illuminations proposed by the poet Paul Verlaine, Rimbaud's former lover. In his preface, Verlaine explained that the title was based on the English word illuminations, in the sense of coloured plates, and a sub-title that Rimbaud had already given the work. Verlaine dated its composition between 1873 and 1875.

Rimbaud wrote the majority of poems comprising Illuminations during his stay in the United Kingdom with Verlaine at his side. The texts follow Rimbaud's peregrinations in 1873 from Reading where he had hoped to find steady work, to Charleville and Stuttgart in 1875.

== Content, style, and themes ==
The text of Illuminations is generally agreed to consist of forty-two poems. In large part, due to the circumstances surrounding the publication of the poems of Illuminations, there is no consensus as to the order in which Rimbaud intended the poems to appear. Nevertheless, certain conventions stand among the many editions of the text. For example, the various publications of Illuminations almost invariably begin with "Après Le Deluge". Despite this ostensible controversy, a large number of scholars have declared the order of Illuminations to be irrelevant. Perhaps translator Bertrand Mathieu best distilled the major reasons for this contention: "No single poem really depends on the others or counts on them to achieve its own perfections. Each is intrinsic (we don't know the exact sequence and we don't need to know it)."

The collection consists overwhelmingly of prose poems, which number forty of the forty-two poems. The two exceptions are "Marine" and "Mouvement", which are vers libre. These two poems are remarkable not only as exceptions within Illuminations itself, but as two of the first free verse poems written in the French language. Within the genres of prose poetry and vers libre, the poems of Illuminations bear many stylistic distinctions. Though influenced by the earlier prose poems of Charles Baudelaire, the prose poems differ starkly from Baudelaire's in that they lack prosaic elements such as linear storytelling and transitions. Because of these differences, Rimbaud's prose poems are denser and more poetic than Baudelaire's. These differences also contribute to the surrealist quality of Illuminations. Though Rimbaud predated surrealism, he is said to have written in a surrealistic style due to the hallucinatory, dreamlike aspect of many of the poems. Another aspect of Rimbaud's style, which also contributes to the visionary quality of the poems, is his use of words for their evocative quality rather than their literal meaning. In addition to these stylistic qualities, Illuminations is rich with sensory imagery. A puzzling aspect of Rimbaud's style is his use of foreign words within the French text of Illuminations. For example, the poem "Being Beauteous" has an English title, even in the original French. Rimbaud biographer Graham Robb suggests that the presence of words from languages like English and German are due in part to Rimbaud's travels. Apparently, as he learned languages, Rimbaud kept lists of words he wished to use in poems.

Because the poems of Illuminations are so diverse and self-contained, they cover a wide range of themes. One theme evident throughout the text is protest. This theme permeates the first poem, "Après Le Deluge", and continues throughout many of the poems in the work. In Illuminations, Rimbaud seems to protest almost everything the society in which he lives has to offer. Another major theme in Illuminations is the city, most evident in the poem "Ville". This theme features prominently in at least six of the poems of Illuminations, and is mentioned in many others. In these poems, Rimbaud expresses a simultaneous attraction and horror towards the modern city. Other major themes include anguish, ecstasy, metamorphosis, nature, walking and travel, creation and destruction.

== Writing Les Illuminations ==
No one knows exactly when Rimbaud's Les Illuminations was written. It can be ascertained, from examination of the poems, that they were not all written at the same time. It is known that the poems were written in many different locations, such as Paris, London, and Belgium. Rimbaud was also involved in various relationships while he was composing these writings. He lived with Paul Verlaine and his small family in Paris from September 1871 to July 1872, with a short stint in Charleville in March, April, and May. The two travelled from Belgium to London in August 1872. It was this trip to London that provided Rimbaud with the backdrop of a British city for many of his poems. The two spent the following year together in London, with Rimbaud visiting Charleville twice. During these months with Verlaine, Rimbaud grew and matured. The majority of the poems included in Les Illuminations were written in 1873, the happiest year of Rimbaud's and Verlaine's relationship.

When his relationship with Verlaine ended, Rimbaud went to live with Germain Nouveau in London in 1874, revising old poems and writing new ones later included in Les Illuminations. Rimbaud's relationship with Nouveau remains mysterious because of the lack of information about their life together. Although little is known about this year in his life, it is certain that in February 1875 Rimbaud had given the manuscript sub-titled Les Illuminations to Verlaine.

== Publication and critical response ==
Two versions of Illuminations were published in 1886, each version arranging texts in orders that differ from the other edition. Earning his living as a trader in the Horn of Africa at this time, Rimbaud was never personally involved in the publication of either edition. He did not leave Africa until 1891 when he was sick to the point of death.

=== Publication history ===
On Verlaine's release from prison in February 1875, Rimbaud entrusted him with the manuscript known today as Illuminations with the mission to mail it to Germain Nouveau in Brussels. Intent on an extended tour of Europe, Rimbaud had asked Nouveau to secure a Belgian publisher in his absence. Soon after sending the manuscript to Nouveau, however, Verlaine was seized with remorse: Why had he not searched for a publisher himself? At Verlaine's request, Nouveau returned the manuscript two years later at a meeting in London in 1877. With a view to publishing the complete works, Verlaine inserted into the original manuscript poems written in 1872 along with texts Rimbaud had given to Nouveau. Several months later, Verlaine loaned the manuscripts to the composer Charles de Sivry (the half-brother of Verlaine's estranged wife, Mathilde Mauté) with the aim of their being set to music. Learning that her half-brother was in possession of Rimbaud's texts, Mathilde expressly forbade de Sivry to return the manuscripts to Verlaine or to anyone else likely to publish them. It was not until nine years later, in 1886, after Mathilde had divorced Verlaine and remarried, that she rescinded her publication ban. Still seeking revenge over the destruction of her marriage by Rimbaud, Mathilde prohibited Verlaine from ever regaining possession of his former lover's manuscripts.

De Sivry confided Rimbaud's texts to Louis Cardonel with the proviso that Verlaine was not to be involved in their publication. Cardonel approached Gustave Kahn, editor of the literary magazine La Vogue, who agreed to publish the work along with a sonnet by Rimbaud in 1886. At Kahn's request, art critic and journalist Félix Fénéon arranged the order of the texts by respecting pages that linked the end of a text and the start of another. Inserted at random were verse poems and a few isolated pages. Despite these preparations, only 35 out of a total of 42 texts were published in La Vogue between May 13 and June 21 due to an obscure dispute between those associated with the project. Later in the year, Kahn commissioned Verlaine to write a preface to the still untitled suite of poems for their publication in book form by Les publications de La Vogue in October 1886. Verlaine gave them their collective name Illuminations or "coloured plates", a title that Rimbaud had earlier proposed as a sub-title. The publishers' dispute ultimately resulted in a dividing up of the manuscripts and their dispersal. Rimbaud died without the benefit of knowing that his manuscripts had not only been published but were lauded and studied, having finally gained the recognition he had strived for.

In 1895, an edition claiming to be the "complete works" of Rimbaud, with a new preface by Verlaine, was published by Vanier éditions, containing only five pieces from Illuminations. Since then, there have been many publications of Rimbaud's Illuminations, both in the original French and in translation.

=== Critical opinion ===
Rimbaud was the subject of an entire chapter in Paul Verlaine's Les Poètes maudits, showing the older poet's devotion to and belief in his young lover. He also wrote an introduction to the Illuminations in the 1891 publication, arguing that despite the years past in which no one heard from Rimbaud his works were still relevant and valuable.

Albert Camus, in his 1951 essay L'homme révolté, hailed Rimbaud as "the poet of revolt, and the greatest", mainly for his last two works, Une saison en enfer and Illuminations — although he vehemently criticized him for his later "resignation" from literature, hence revolt itself, when he became a "bourgeois traficker".

== Translations ==
=== Translation history ===
Arthur Rimbaud's Illuminations, initially written and published in the late 19th century, has been translated numerous times since its original composition. Translators (and often poets in their own right) have undertaken this task repeatedly throughout the last century, producing many distinct, original, and innovative versions of the French collection of prose poetry. Some of the most popular translations include those by Helen Rootham (1932), Louise Varèse (1946/revised 1957), Paul Schmidt (1976), Nick Osmond (1993), Dennis J. Carlile (2001), Martin Sorrell (2001), Wyatt Mason (2002), and the collaborative team composed of Jeremy Harding and John Sturrock (2004). All of these translators have worked to introduce Illuminations to a new generation, each having their own angle in their presentation of the work. Variations in cross-language (French to English) translation, differences in the ordering of texts, discrepancies in the inclusion/exclusion of certain "proems", and incorporation of forwards/introductions written by the specific translators all account for the ability of these works to offer new meaning to Illuminations. In 2011, poet John Ashbery published a translation of Illuminations, which was favorably reviewed in the New York Times Book Review by Lydia Davis as "meticulously faithful yet nimbly inventive."

=== Analysis of translations ===
In the Wyatt Mason translation (2002), much of the Introduction to his version of Illuminations focuses on the biographical details of Rimbaud's life.

In the Nick Osmond translation (1993), a thorough reading of the Introduction again provides background information and proves useful in examining his purpose for translating.

In the Jeremy Harding and John Sturrock translation (2004), the reader is the focus of the work. Parallel text has been adopted to make the reading more manageable for the literary audience, and although this is known to "cramp" a translator's style, Harding & Sturrock chose to do so for the sake of their readers. In addition, this translation takes much liberty in the sounds established through cross-language barriers. Instead of focusing on keeping the syllable count consistent with the French when translated to English, the translators chose to use words sounding more pleasant to the 'English ear'. Also interesting, this translation includes only half of the forty-two prose poems known to make up Illuminations, proving further liberties have been taken in its formation.

== Influence and legacy ==
Symbolism: The Paris literary review La Vogue was the first to publish Illuminations. Knowing little about Rimbaud, the editor Gustave Kahn mistakenly introduced him as "the late Arthur Rimbaud", thereby facilitating his adoption by the Symbolists as a legendary poetic figure. Rimbaud's style and syntactical choices pointed to Symbolist tendencies, including the use of abstract plural nouns.

Dadaism: In its rejection of the sensible and logical, Dadaism embraced Rimbaud's ability to write in abstractions and impossibilities. This supports Rimbaud's role in revolutions as the Dadaist movement was a protest movement against capitalist ideals believed to be at the root of all war.

Surrealists: Rimbaud's poetry was "Surrealist before the word was invented or became a movement". Although Surrealists often disowned all art before their time, Rimbaud is one of the few predecessors the group acknowledged. Like Dadaists, Surrealists do not accept rationality as they believe it to be the cause of unhappiness and injustice. Rimbaud's passion to "change life" is echoed in the Surrealist's call to change reality through (only currently) impossibilities. A main difference, however, is that Rimbaud did not "abandon himself passively" to automatic writing like many Surrealist writers.

The French painter Charles Picart Le Doux, drafted to serve in World War I in 1914, paid a last visit to his studio, where he slipped into his pocket his copy of Les Illuminations, the book he deemed "the most apt to console me for the stupidity of men. It was to be my companion for the next four years."

Rimbaud's life and works have inspired many musicians. Vocal works (operas and short songs), symphonies, trios, piano pieces, and rock songs exist, taking as their subjects Illuminations and Rimbaud's earlier work, A Season in Hell.

The British composer Benjamin Britten set a selection of Illuminations to music. Les Illuminations for tenor or soprano and strings, Op. 18 uses nine prose poems: "Fanfare", "Villes", "Phrase", "Antique", "Royauté", "Marine", "Interlude", "Being Beauteous", "Parade", and "Départ". The Decca Record Co. (London) released a historic recording featuring Britten conducting the work, with Britten's lifelong companion Peter Pears singing the tenor part (Britten had dedicated his setting of the song "Being Beauteous" to Pears).

American composer Harold Blumenfeld devoted an entire decade immersing himself in Rimbaud, producing four compositions, namely: La Face Cendrée, Ange de Flamme et de la Glace, Illuminations, and Carnet de damné. Three of these works are based on prose poems from Illuminations. La Face Cendreé is a work for soprano, cello, and piano; it takes the "Aube" and "Being Beauteous" as subject. Ange de Flamme et de la Glace, a work for medium voice and chamber ensemble, is based on the "Barbare". Blumenfeld's two-part orchestral work, Illuminations, is based on five prose poems from Rimbaud's work: "Mystique", "Diluvial", "Après le déluge", "À une raison", and "Soir historique".

Other composers inspired by Rimbaud are Bulgarian composer Henri Lazarof and German composers Georg Katzer and Andreas Staffel (born 1965). Henri Lazarof's Fifth Symphony uses two French texts, one by Lazarof himself and the other by Rimbaud. Georg Katzer's Trio for Oboe, Cello, and Piano uses an essay by Rimbaud. Andreas Staffel's work Illumination is for piano, based on Rimbaud's Illuminations.

Hans Krása's 3 Lieder After Poems by Rimbaud, was composed in the confines of the Terezín ghetto (Theresienstadt) in Czechoslovakia. The Bohemian composer Hans Krása (1899–1944) was a pupil of celebrated composers Zemlinsky and Roussel. These "Rimbaud Songs" are set for baritone, clarinet, viola, and cello. On the last page of Krása's original manuscript was a rehearsal schedule in the concentration camp: four were held in the Magdburg Barracks and one in the Dresden Barracks.

Rock musicians Bob Dylan, Jim Morrison, and Patti Smith have expressed their appreciation for Rimbaud (the latter calling Dylan the reincarnation of the French poet). The essay "Rimbaud and Patti Smith: Style as Social Deviance" by Carrie Jaurès Noland features a critical analysis of Rimbaud's influence on Patti Smith's work. Wallace Fowlie's book, Rimbaud and Jim Morrison: The Rebel as Poet, attempts to draw parallels between the lives and personalities of Rimbaud and Jim Morrison, demonstrating how the latter found Rimbaud a constant source of inspiration. Fowlie argues that some of Morrison's "lost writings" (a volume of poetry published posthumously, entitled Wilderness) bear strong resemblance to pieces from Illuminations.
