= Andrée Viollis =

French journalist and writer (1870–1950)

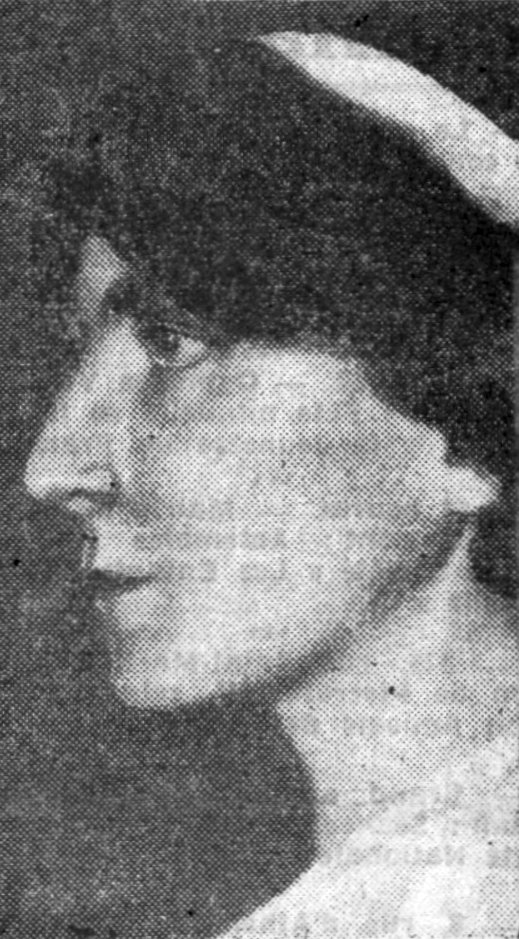
Andrée Viollis

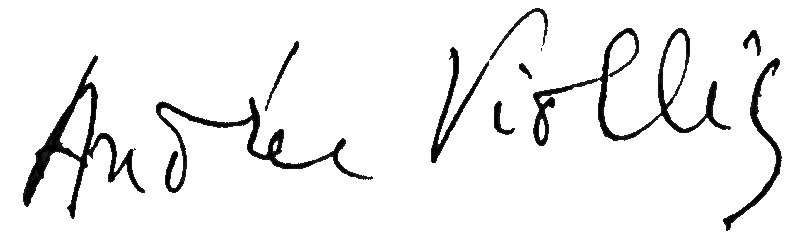
signature

Andrée Viollis (9 December 1870 – 9 August 1950) was a French journalist and writer. A prominent figure in news journalism and major reporting, she was an anti-fascist and feminist activist who was part of the French group associated with the World Committee Against War and Fascism. Viollis worked for various newspapers, including La Fronde, L'Écho de Paris, Excelsior, Le Petit Parisien, The Times, Daily Mail, Vendredi, Ce soir, and L'Humanité. She received several awards, including the Legion of Honour.

== Early life and education ==
Andrée Françoise Claudius Jacquet de la Verryere was born in Mées on 9 December 1870 to a cultivated bourgeois family. After obtaining her baccalaureate, she studied at the Sorbonne and graduated from the University of Oxford.

== Career ==
After graduation, she turned to journalism and made her debut in the feminist newspaper La Fronde, directed by Marguerite Durand.

She married Gustave Téry, professor of philosophy, with whom she had two children, including Simone Téry. In 1903, when Simone was four, Andree divorced Gustave. In 1905, she married Henri d'Ardenne de Tizac, curator of the Musée Cernuschi and author of novels under the pseudonym of Jean Viollis. They had two other children. With her second husband, she became involved in literary journalism as a critic, columnist, serialist, and storyteller; they also co-authored novels.

Viollis affiliated with L'Écho de Paris and Excelsior, writing in favor of women's emancipation and the rights of the mother. From 1914, she worked at the newspaper Le Petit Parisien, staying twenty years, where she turned to major reporting and covered diverse areas, including sporting events, major trials, political interviews, and war correspondence. During World War I, for the period of 1914 to 1916, she served as a nurse at the front, as well as at Bar-le-Duc and Sainte-Menehould.

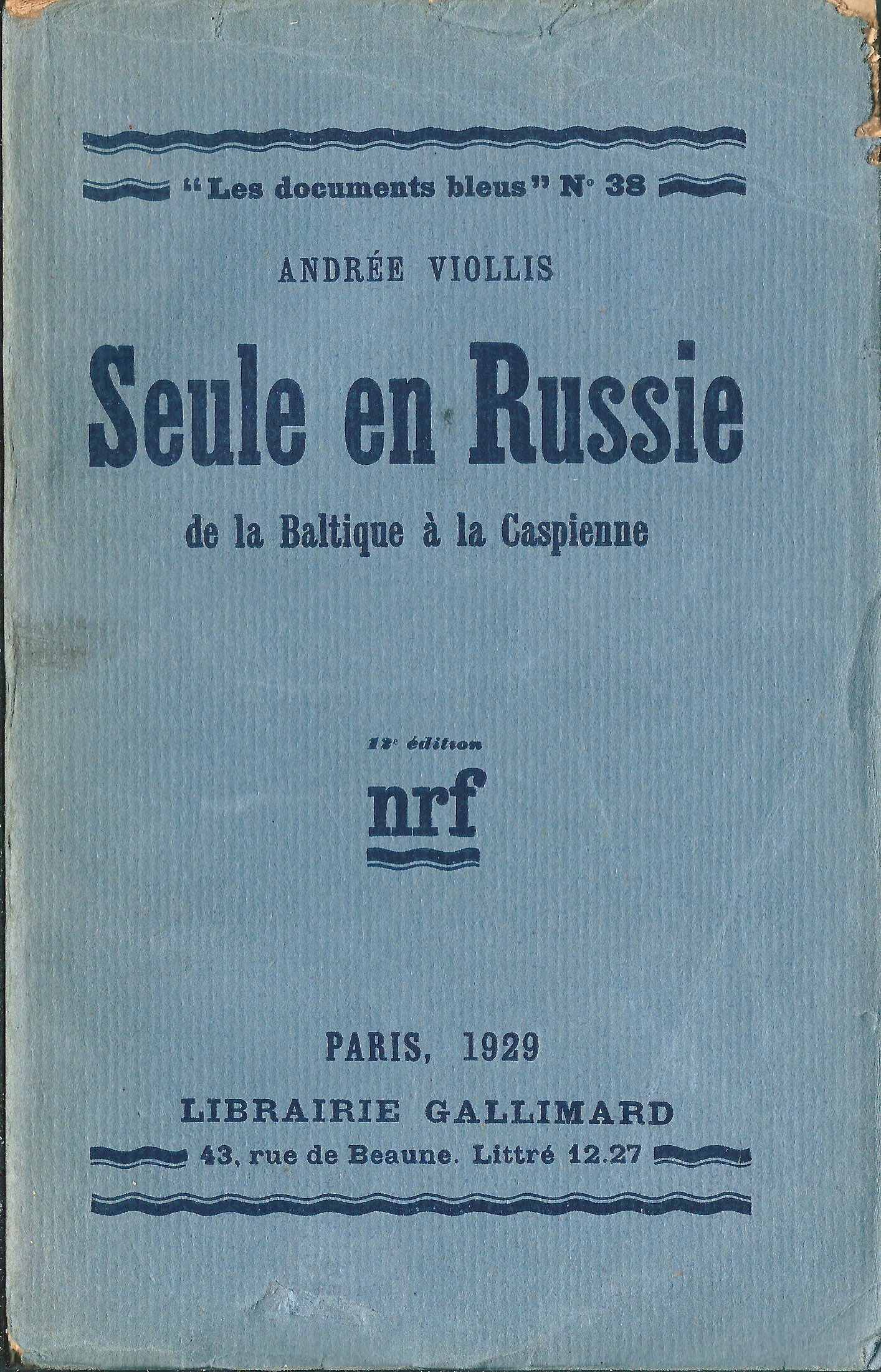
Seule en Russie (1929)

In 1919 and until 1922, she served as editorial assistant to The Times and the Daily Mail. She investigated the USSR of 1927 ten years after the Bolshevik Revolution, testified to the Afghan civil war in 1929, to the Indian revolt in 1930, accompanied the Minister for the Colonies, Paul Reynaud in Indochina in 1931, and followed in 1932 the Shanghai incident.

During the Popular Front, she joined forces with anti-fascist intellectuals. With the support of André Chamson and Jean Guéhenno, she became the director of the weekly political-literary Vendredi, where she defended the cause of the Spanish Republic and of the victims of French colonization.

Viollis was part of the French group associated with the World Committee Against War and Fascism. In 1936, in Paris, she chaired the first congress of the Union des jeunes filles de France. In 1938, she joined the editorial staff of the communist daily Ce soir, directed by Louis Aragon and Jean-Richard Bloch. After Vendredi ended publication in November 1938, she joined La Lumière, along with Louis Martin-Chauffier and André Wurmser. Close to communist intellectual circles, she joined the Resistance in the southern zone during World War II, and put her journalist experience to work for this commitment, spending the war years in Lyon and Dieulefit.

== Later life and death ==
In 1945, Andrée Viollis worked again with Ce soir. She also collaborated with some publications of the communist movement. She took up major reports, which leads her to travel to South Africa. In the same year, she was sent by L'Humanité to the United States to cover the French section of the Office of War Information.

Viollis died in Paris on 9 August 1950. She was interred in the Montparnasse Cemetery. Her grave does not include a date of birth.

== Selected works ==
- Criquet, Calmann-Lévy, 1913
- Lord Northcliffe, B. Grasset, 1919
- La perdrix dorée, Baudinière coll. "Les Maîtres de la plume", 1925
- La Vraie Mme de La Fayette, Bloud et Gay, 1926
- Seule en Russie, de la Baltique à la Caspienne, Gallimard, 1927
- Alsace et Lorraine au-dessus des passions, V. Attinger coll. "Occident", 1928
- L'Inde contre les Anglais, Éd. des portiques, 1930
- Tourmente sur l'Afghanistan, Librairie Valois, coll. "Explorations du monde nouveau", 1930
- Changhaï et le destin de la Chine, R.-A. Corrêa, coll. "Faits et gestes", 1933 (Introduction de Henri Rohrer)
- Le Japon et son empire, B. Grasset, coll. "Les Ecrits", 1933
- Le Japon intime, F. Aubier, coll. "des Documents", 1934
- Le Conflit sino-japonais, M. Maupoint, 1938
- Notre Tunisie, Gallimard, 1939
- Le Racisme hitlérien, machine de guerre contre la France, 1943
- Le Secret de la reine Christine, Éditions Agence Gutenberg, coll. "Les Vies illustres romancées", 1944
- Puycerrampion (avec Jean Viollis), la Bibliothèque française, 1947
- L'Afrique du Sud, cette inconnue, Hachette, coll. "Choses vues, aventures vécues", 1948
