= Le Cercle Molière =

French live theatre group based in Manitoba

Le Cercle Moliere
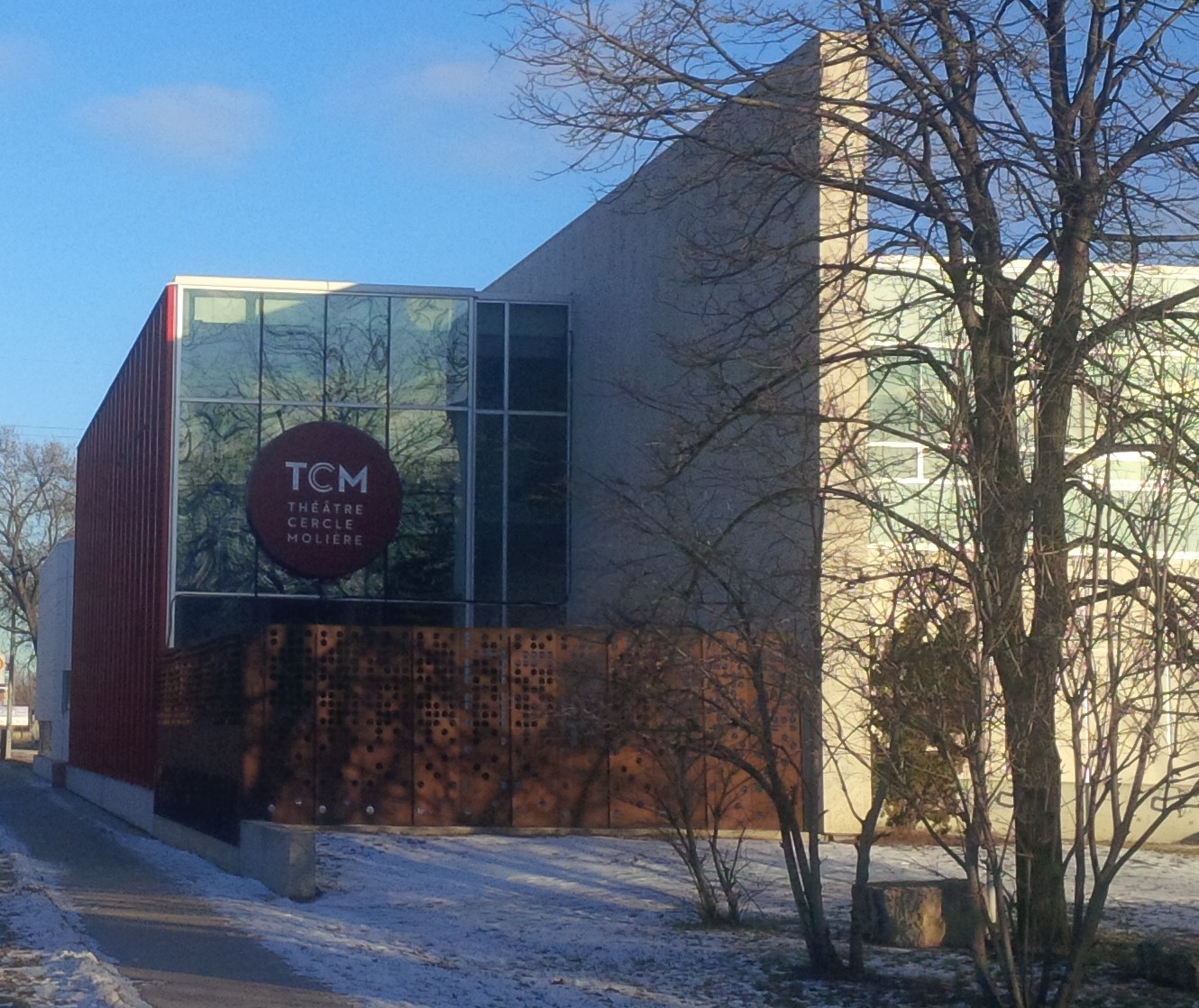
- Théâtre Cercle Molière in the CCFM building
- Formation: 1925; 101 years ago
- Type: Theatre group
- Location(s): Centre Culturel Franco Manitobain; 340, boul. Provencher; St. Boniface, Manitoba; R2H 0G7
- Artistic director: Genevieve Pelletier
- Website: www.cerclemoliere.com

Le Cercle Molière is a theatre company in Winnipeg, Manitoba, Canada.

== History ==
The theatre company has operated since 1925. Its activities include a four-play subscription season, a youth production that tours Manitoba schools, a high school theatre festival (Festival théâtre-jeunesse), a series of live play readings (5 à 7 ½), a directing workshop for new works and talent (Marathon de mises en scène) and children's drama classes (The Cercle Molière's Theatre School). Le Cercle Molière is also well known throughout Winnipeg for the Lobster Gala.

Le Cercle Molière began as a group of amateurs performing one or two plays per year, like most Canadian theatre groups in the early 20th century. By the 1970s it had become a professional company. Le Cercle Molière is thus the oldest continuously running theatre company in Canada. It operates as a registered not-for-profit arts organization under a volunteer board of governors.

Manitoba's Cercle Molière is the oldest permanent theatre company with uninterrupted programming in Canada. The earliest recorded "dramatic and literary evening" in Manitoba took place in 1866, and some twenty groups formed and dissolved before Le Cercle Molière was founded on March 8, 1925, by three friends who had worked together on other theatre projects: André Castelein de la Lande (artistic director 1925–27), Raymond Bernier (secretary and treasurer) and Louis-Philippe Gagnon (president 1925–27). They chose the name "Le Cercle Molière" to reflect their ambitious goal of performing the great works of French dramatic literature in Saint Boniface, Winnipeg. The founders wanted Le Cercle Molière to create ties between the French and English communities in Manitoba, so an advisory committee composed of six members – three francophones and three anglophones – was established.

The first play produced by Le Cercle Molière was Édouard Pailleron's Le Monde où l'on s'ennuie, directed by Arthur Boutal and presented at the Dominion Theatre on 25 April 1925. The production sold out and generated a profit of $116.25.

In 1928, after the Canadian première of Alphonse Daudet's musical L’Arlésienne, Arthur Boutal became the second artistic director. During his tenure, the theatre company built its reputation locally through well-attended performances in the major theatres of Winnipeg, such as the Walker Theatre (now the Burton Cummings Theatre), the Pantages Playhouse Theatre and the Civic Auditorium, and nationally through the prizes it brought home from the Dominion Drama Festival. As early as 1929, Le Cercle Molière began a tradition of touring the French-speaking municipalities of rural Manitoba. The theatre company participated in the Dominion Drama Festival twelve times, starting in 1934, and won numerous awards, including three first prizes for best production. In 1937, three local English-language theatre groups performed benefit shows to help cover their travel expenses; the reward was a third win for best play and for best French-language actress. Among cast members at the time were Pauline Boutal and a young teacher named Gabrielle Roy.

The Dominion Drama Festival was cancelled during World War II, but it returned in 1947. Meanwhile, Le Cercle Molière continued to produce plays to help the Red Cross. When Arthur Boutal died suddenly in June 1941, his wife Pauline was persuaded to take over his position. She was a commercial artist working for the Winnipeg office of Bridgens. She had been involved in many aspects of the productions, and spent over 25 years as artistic director, directing 27 plays. She insisted on the quality of the French spoken on stage, maintaining that stage characters did not need to speak as ordinary people did. As she saw the need to offer training locally, she organized numerous workshops to be given by theatre professionals brought in from Central Canada.

To celebrate its 25th anniversary, Le Cercle Molière produced Molière’s The Miser in 1950. Other Molière plays produced by the company included The Imaginary Invalid in 1954, Scapin the Schemer in 1956, Le Médecin malgré lui produced in 1955, touring in 1959 and 1962, and Le mariage forcé in 2010.

In 1957, the Canada Council for the Arts was founded, and Le Cercle Molière received one of the first touring grants, which allowed them to reach 5,000 spectators across Western Canada in 12 days. In 1961, they toured their first Canadian play Chambres à louer.

As early as 1963, the urge to go professional had led to a major restructuring, under a board of governors who were community business leaders. Pauline remained as artistic director until 1967 when she hired Jean-Guy Roy to be the first salaried artistic director. He was followed the next year by a young fine arts graduate with a teaching background named Roland Mahé, who had studied at the National Theatre School in Montreal, then at the École supérieure d'art dramatique de Strasbourg, France. Mahé became Le Cercle Molière's first full-time artistic director. In retirement, Pauline received many awards for her contributions over the years to the vitality of the francophone community of Manitoba.

During Mahé’s 44 years of service, Le Cercle Molière underwent numerous changes to keep up with the major trends throughout Canadian theatre; he was determined to turn Le Cercle Molière into a professional theatre company that could expand its programming beyond the standard French repertoire. The season was expanded to include four and then five productions per season, and in 1969, children's theatre was added to the programming. By 1970, Mahé reached out to young people by setting up the Festival théâtre-jeunesse (FTJ), where high school students produced their own plays and presented them in a festival setting. French-language high schools re-opened in 1972 for the first time since 1916, when legislation had altered Manitoba's educational language rights. The company sent performers to hold workshops in these schools, as there was no formal drama education in the curriculum. By its 40th anniversary in 2010, the FTJ was a week-long event with adjudication and a gala awards ceremony, involving over 700 students from Manitoba's French schools and French immersion programs.

As part of the 1970 celebrations of Manitoba's centennial as a Canadian province, a production of Obaldia's Du vent dans les branches de sassafras toured in Quebec and New Brunswick, and played at the National Arts Centre in Ottawa. Although Le Cercle Molière was not an avant-garde theatre by vocation, that same year Mahé produced Michel Tremblay’s Les Belles-sœurs for the Manitoba audience, only two years after its explosive opening in Montreal. It was closely followed by À toi pour toujours, ta Marilou, which sold out its 10-night run in 1972. In 1973, Mahé was ready to offer the first all-Canadian season, which was well-received, and convinced him that his audience wanted the theatre to reflect its identity and preoccupations.

For several decades, Le Cercle Molière moved around to wherever rehearsal and performance space was offered: private houses; classrooms; empty commercial space; the basement of the St. Boniface Cathedral; and a wing of Académie Saint-Joseph, where Gabrielle Roy taught, and which housed the St. Boniface Cultural Centre. After the Franco-Manitoban Cultural Centre (CCFM) was constructed in 1974, the company moved its shows into the 300-seat Salle Pauline-Boutal, and for the first time acquired offices, workshops, and storage space, which led into twenty years of further expansion, with bigger, costlier productions and elaborate sets by designers like Réjean Labrie. However, by 1997 filling the stage strained the company's finances. Mahé introduced the subscription season in 1974 to establish financial stability for the company. In 1975, experimental theatre workshops, called CM2, were offered for young adults, which served as a training ground for new performers for the next ten years. To celebrate the company's 50th anniversary in 1975, a new Franco-Manitoban play, Je m’en vais à Regina by Roger Auger, was the season highlight. Other experiments included the Bureau d’animation théâtrale (BAT), set up in the 1980s to coordinate activities for young people; resources in the schools and communities; and a community theatre festival. The season included a guest production from elsewhere in Canada as a way of sharing with local audiences the talent on display in similar-sized theatre companies from coast to coast.

In 1985, a division for youth programming and community development was set up. Le Théâtre du Grand Cercle (TGC) was directed by Mahé's sister, Irène Mahé, who had been active in the company for years. Its mandate was to produce two shows per season to take on tour through Manitoban schools and the Western provinces. This led to organizing school matinées for the main season's shows, a young audience production, a touring review entitled "De bouche à oreille" as a support for French language learning in the schools, acting and technical workshops, preparation workshops for the FTJ, and a festival of student plays. By 2012, the TGC reached out to over 8200 young people. Irène Mahé was inducted into the Ordre des francophones d’Amérique in 1996.

With a base of faithful subscribers, the challenge year after year was to design a season that would be interesting to new theatre-goers and to those who had seen many previous seasons as well. 1986 was the first year to feature all Franco-Manitoban plays. Since then, each season has had a central theme, and new writers' plays have been produced by Le Cercle Molière.

Financial strains and scheduling problems brought on by the success of the CCFM sent Le Cercle Molière to its smaller space, the Théâtre de la Chapelle, in 1997. When the 2004-05 season completely sold out, it was considered to be an indication that such programming choices were agreeable to the audience, and that a larger space could allow ticket sales to grow.

After several years of fundraising for a properly equipped theatre for Le Cercle Molière, the theatre company moved to its new location in 2010.

Mahé retired in 2012 after 115 productions and 44 years of service to Le Cercle Molière and to French-language theatre in Canada. His successor, Geneviève Pelletier, took over in July 2012.

== Theatre ==
The company operates in a dedicated theatre in Old Saint-Boniface, Winnipeg's French quarter. The 125-seat, flexible multi-purpose theatre opened in 2010.

== Affiliations and collaborations ==
Le Cercle Molière is a member of the Association des théâtres francophones du Canada (ATFC or Canadian association of French-language theatres), and is a founding member of the Association des Compagnies de théâtre de l'Ouest (ACTO, or Association of Western Theatre Companies).

The company has collaborated with companies such as the Prairie Theatre Exchange, the Manitoba Theatre for Young People (1986), the Théâtre français du Centre national des Arts (1991, 1992, and 2002), the Unithéâtre (2002) and the Théâtre français de Toronto (1989 and 1991), and has hosted productions from visiting companies across Canada, France, and Germany.

== Awards ==
Over the years Le Cercle Molière has received many honours and awards. The French government has recognized the services rendered by the company in promoting French culture and, through its embassy, has given several awards to members of the troupe: the Palmes académiques to Arthur and Pauline Boutal (1939); the Médaille de la Reconnaissance to Pauline Boutal (1950); and the Médaille du Ministère des affaires étrangères to Norbert Trudel, Christiane LeGoff and Suzanne Tremblay.

The Canada Council for the Arts offered bursaries to members of Le Cercle Molière for studies in Canada or abroad. The Canadian Drama Award was awarded to Arthur and Pauline Boutal (1950), Elisa Houde (1949), Christiane LeGoff (1963) and Gilles Guyot (1966). Pauline Boutal received the award of Mérite de la culture française in Canada (1971) and became a member of the Order of Canada (1973). In 1991, the Prix Réseau was awarded to Irene Mahé, who became a member of the Ordre des Francophones d'Amerique (1991). In 1995, Roland Mahé received the Prix Manitoba Award.
