= Louis Parrot =

French poet, novelist, and journalist (1906–1948)

Louis Parrot (28 August 1906 – 24 August 1948) was a French poet, novelist and journalist.

Louis Parrot was born in Tours and came from a family of laborers and artisans. He became an apprentice at 12 years old, first in a bank and then in a library, where he developed a love of books. He wrote his first poems in the early 1920s. The collection of poems « Misery Farm » in 1934 affirm his talent and his vocation as a poet. He went to do literary studies in Spain. He meet a lot of writers and poets including Paul Éluard in Madrid. During the civil war, he returned to France. He joined the staff of the newspaper Ce soir founded by Jean-Richard Bloch and Louis Aragon, and became chief editor in August 1944. During the World War II, he lived in Clermont-Ferrand and his house was a center of the Résistance for intellectuals. He died in Paris, aged 41.

As well as poetry, he wrote three novels, and several stories and essays of poetic inspiration.

== Works ==
collection of poems

- Ode à Minerve meurtrière
- Tristesse des soirs paisibles
- Cornemuse de l'orage
- Misery farm
- Mystères douloureux
- Œil de fumée

novels

- Le Grenier à Sel
- Nous reviendrons
- La Flamme et la Cendre

stories and essays

- Panorama de la culture espagnole
- Le poète et son image
- Paul Éluard
- L'intelligence en guerre
- Où habite l'oubli
- Federico Garcia Lorca
- Ursule la laide
- Blaise Cendrars
- Paille noire des étables
- Mozart
