= Simone Téry =

French journalist and novelist (1897–1967)

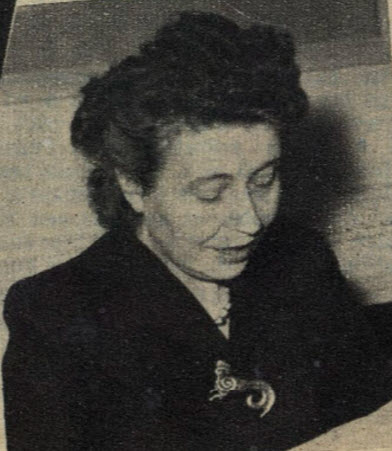
Simone Téry in 1951

Simone Téry (January 28, 1897 – December 12, 1967) was a French journalist who wrote several books and was a war correspondent. She wrote for L'Humanité, Vendredi, and Regards. She reported on the Irish Civil War, interwar France, and the Spanish Civil War.

== Family ==
Téry was born on January 28, 1897, to a family of writers and journalists. Her mother was Andrée Viollis, a reporter and author. Téry's father Gustave (1870–1928) was the founder of the newspaper L'Œuvre.

== Ireland ==
The Irish War of Independence broke in January 1919. After two years, a truce was signed between the Irish rebel leaders and the British government in July 1921. A month after that, Téry arrived in Ireland to report on how the truce was holding up. She was writing for her father's paper, L'Œuvre. She interviewed leaders and politicians across the country including members of Sinn Féin; Éamon de Valera, and Arthur Griffith. She is reported to be the only journalist to have interviewed Michael Collins. She took most of her articles and collected them into the book: En Irlande. De la guerre d'inde'pendance d la guerre civile (1914–1923) (1923) (In Ireland, from the War of Independence to the Civil War).

Her next book was a collection of interviews with Irish writers, poets, and other members of cultural including W. B. Yeats, George William Russell, J. M. Synge, James Stephens, George Moore, and James Joyce. The book, entitled L'lle des bardes. Notes sur la litterature irlandaise Contemporaine (1925) also defended the cause of Irish independence. In writing the book, she became friends with George William Russell, who went by the pseudonym Æ. She dedicated the book to him. He was editor and founder of the Irish Statesman, when Téry served as Paris correspondent for the paper.

== Interwar ==
After her Irish books, she returned to France to continue reporting. In 1928, she was awarded the Albert Kahn Around-the-World Scholarship.

While always left-leaning, much like her parents, she did not fully embrace the communist ideologue until after a trip to the Soviet Union in 1935. She joined the French communist party and remained a committed communist until her death.

After her trip to Spain she wrote Front de la liberte. Espagne 1937–1938 (1938). She spent time with the Republicans fighting against the Nationalists. In 1945, she wrote a novel based on her reportage for the Front de la liberte. She met Spanish poet Juan Chabás and soon married him in 1938.

== Second World War ==
When Germany invaded France in May 1940, she and her husband were able to catch the last boat to Mexico on June 15, 1940. She spent most of the Second World War there. After the war, she returned to reporting. She wrote a book about Danielle Casanova, a militant communist who was a member of the French Resistance.
