= Juan Chabás =

Spanish-born poet and writer

Juan Chabás (September 10, 1900, Dénia – October 29, 1954) was a Spanish-born poet and writer. He was a member of the influential group of writers known as the Generation of '27. He fled to exile in Cuba following the Spanish Civil War.

In 1938, he met French journalist Simone Téry, whom he married in 1938. They would later divorce.

Juan Chabás died of a heart attack at age 54 in Santiago de Cuba and is buried in the Colon Cemetery, Havana.

== Works ==
- Espejos 1919-verso-1920 (1921),
- Sin velas desvelada, (1927),
- Puerto de sombra, (1928),
- Italia fascista (1929),
- Vuelo y estilo (1930),
- Agor sin fin, (1930),
- Historia de la literatura española (1932),
- Literatura española contemporánea (1898–1950) (1952),
- Fábula y vida, (1955),
- Árbol de ti nacido (1956).
