= Pauline Boutal =

Canadian artist, theatrical designer, actress and educator

Pauline Boutal C.M. (September 8, 1894 – April 30, 1992) was a French Canadian artist, theatrical designer, actress and educator.

== Early life ==
The daughter of Jean-François Le Goff, a stained glass artist, and Louise Cabon, she was born Pauline Le Goff in Lanhouarneau in Brittany. Her grandfather, François Cabon, was also a stained glass artist. She came to Manitoba with her family in October 1907, first living in St. Laurent and then moving to Saint Boniface in spring 1909. In September 1909, she began working for the Franco-Manitoban newspaper Le Nouvelliste as a typesetter. There, she also met her future husband Arthur Boutal. In 1911, she began studying art at the Winnipeg Art Club. Arthur Boutal went to France to serve in its defence at the start of World War I in 1914; in 1916, she joined him there and they were married.

== Career ==
On her return from France in 1917, Boutal joined the commercial art firm Brigdens of Winnipeg, where she mainly worked on illustrations for the Eaton's catalogue. She continued her studies in art at the Winnipeg School of Art (now the School of Art at the University of Manitoba), taking classes with LeMoine FitzGerald and Frank Johnston. She also later took lessons with George Elmer Browne and Henry Hensche in the United States, with André Lhote in Paris and with Charles Picart Le Doux at the Académie de la Grande Chaumière.

In 1925, Boutal and her husband became involved with the Winnipeg theatre company Le Cercle Molière. Her husband was company director and she became an actress in the company. After his death in 1941, she succeeded her husband as director. She contributed to set and costume design for the theatre company, as well as for the Winnipeg Little Theatre and the Royal Winnipeg Ballet. As an actress, she was named Best Actor three times at the Dominion Drama Festival and, in 1938, received the Lady Tweedsmuir prize for best individual performance by a woman. She was also named Best Director twice at the Dominion Drama Festival.

Also in 1941, Boutal ended her career in commercial art to concentrate on painting landscapes and portraits. From 1932 to 1975, she exhibited with the Manitoba Society of Artists; she was also included in group shows at the Winnipeg Art Gallery and had four solo exhibitions at the Centre culturel Franco-manitobain.

== Collections ==
Her work is included in the collection of the Musée national des beaux-arts du Québec.

== Honours ==
Boutal was named an Officier in the French Ordre des Palmes Académiques in 1939. In 1950, she received the Canadian Drama Award. She received a Manitoba Golden Boy Award in 1963, the first francophone to receive that honour. She was named to the Order of Canada in 1973 for her contributions to the development and growth of French theatre in Manitoba. In 1975, the Centre culturel Franco-manitobain renamed its theatre Salle Pauline Boutal in her honour. She received an honorary doctorate from the University of Manitoba in 1978. Boutal was named to the Ordre des francophones d'Amérique in 1981.

== Later life and death ==
Later in life, she gave private art classes in her studio at home and also taught art to children at a local school on Saturday mornings.

Boutal died in Saint Boniface at the age of 97.
