= Luc Durtain =

French poet, novelist, journalist

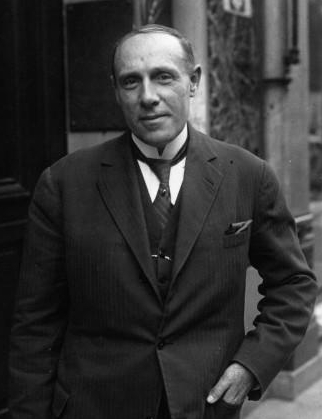
Durtain in 1928

André Robert Gustave Nepveu (March 10, 1881, in Paris – January 29, 1959), known under his pseudonym Luc Durtain, was a French poet, novelist, journalist, playwright and a physician by profession.

== Life ==
Durtain's talents were discovered by Jules Romains who introduced him to the group Abbaye de Créteil. There he became close friends with writers Charles Vildrac and Georges Duhamel. In 1908, Durtain published the collection of poems Pegasus, written in the style of unanimism.

Durtain served as a doctor during the First World War and wrote his first novel in the trenches. His novel was eventually published in 1922 and highly praised by critics.

It was not until the mid twenties however where became well known by establishing himself as a travel writer. His books on America, such as The 40th Floor and Frank and Marjorie, contrast the achievements of technology with the intellectual impoverishment of contemporary bourgeois society. In the cycle of novels Remembrances of Your Life, he painted a rather broad picture of French society. In 1927 he visited the Soviet Union, then sympathetically described his impressions in the book A Different Europe: Moscow and Its Faith.

He continued to travel around the world exploring Africa and Indochina, where he became an associate of the Vietnamese nationalist leader Phan Bội Châu.

Durtain was of left-wing and pacifist convictions, and spoke against the rise of fascism in Europe. He urged Jules Romain for the drafting of the manifesto against the bombardment of Adoua by Fascist Italy and the invasion of Poland by Nazi Germany. He condemned the Soviet Union for the Molotov-Ribbentropp pact. A member of the steering committee of the magazine Europe since its creation, he created and co-directed with Paul Nizan from 1937 to 1940 Les Cahiers de la Jeunesse, a monthly magazine intended for communist youth and published under the patronage of Romain Rolland.

During the Second World War, he contributed literary articles to the socialist newspaper of Jean Luchaire, Les Nouveaux Temps which switched to collaboration with the Vichy regime after 1942. Although he was not affected by the Épuration légale but was dismissed from Europe magazine. He continued to publish until his death, giving in particular an immense contemporary historical fresco in four volumes: "Memoirs of your life".

== Works ==
- 1907: L'Étape nécessaire
- 1914: Kong Harald
- 1920: Le Retour des hommes
- 1924: Perspectives, illustrated by Berthold Mahn
- 1925: Ma Kimbell
- 1927: Quarantième étage
- 1927: Le Donneur de sang, comédie en trois actes
- 1927: Découverte de Longview with Frans Masereel
- 1928: Hollywood dépassé
- 1928: Quelques Notes d'U.S.A.
- 1928: L'Autre Europe: Moscou et sa foi
- 1930: Dieux blancs, hommes jaunes
- 1930: Lignes de vie
- 1931: Captain O.K.
- 1933: Vers la ville kilomètre 3
- 1934: Frank et Marjorie
- 1935: Quatre continents
- 1936: Le Globe sous le bras
- 1938: Voyage au pays des Bohohom
- 1939: La Guerre n'existe pas
- 1944: Les Secrets du rêve
