= East Flemish Rowing League =

Belgian rowing club

The East-Flemish Rowing League (EFRL) is a member of the Flemish Rowing League, the first federalised sports league of Belgium. It is a member of the Belgian Royal Rowing Federation, which in turn is also a founding member of the Fédération Internationale des Sociétés d'Aviron (FISA), the oldest Olympic international sports federation.

== Function ==
The League is a non-profit association of local rowing clubs in the Belgian city of Ghent and a collaborative alliance between five rowing clubs in the province of East Flanders. Once there were rowing clubs in the cities and Geraardsbergen and Lokeren, but today all the clubs are active around the Watersportbaan of Ghent, including the adjacent Canal Ghent-Bruges.

The League makes efforts to expand activities to other locations with the help of the Province, including the cities of Sint-Niklaas, Lokeren and Oudenaarde. In Oudenaarde the rival towns of Ename and Eine organise an annual rowing meet featuring a race with eight men crews and also a ladies coxed fours race on the river Scheldt, near the bridge over the river between the two villages. The teams practice and prepare themselves in the spring at the Royal Club Nautique de Gand and rowing Royal Sport Gent on the Watersportbaan of Ghent. It is an initiative of twin brothers Benedicte and Frederic Dullaert, who were famous coxswains back in the 1990s of large Belgian national junior teams including on the World Juniors Championships Rowing in Poznań and also won a series of 8 consecutive national titles.

== Clubs ==
The affiliated clubs are:

- Royal Club Nautique de Gand (Koninkliojke Roeivereniging Club Gent 1871)
- Royal Sport Gent 1883
- Ghent Rowing and Sportsclub
- Veterans Association Club
- Ghent Students Rowing

The latter is the first and only official student rowing club in Flanders, founded back in 2004. Meetings alternate among the respective club premises and the chairmanship of the East-Flemish Rowing League is shared according to a fixed rotation.

== Events ==
This collaboration is co-responsible for three international rowing regatta. The two largest are the Spring Regatta and the May – Regatta, conducted in cooperation with the Flemish Rowing League and the Belgian Royal Rowing Federation. Both are held in the City of Ghent on the urban Watersportbaan.

There is also a Charles V Cup, (named for Charles V, Holy Roman Emperor) with races for various boat types and categories of young to old, which takes place on the Canal Ghent-Bruges.

There are also two recreational boating trips including the Passage true Gent (Doortocht van Gent) via Graslei and Portus Ganda and the old Port of Ghent; the Golden River Rowing Trip through the picturesque art painters village of Sint-Martens-Latem; and the Deinze- Ghent cruise.
