= International Regatta KRC Ghent =

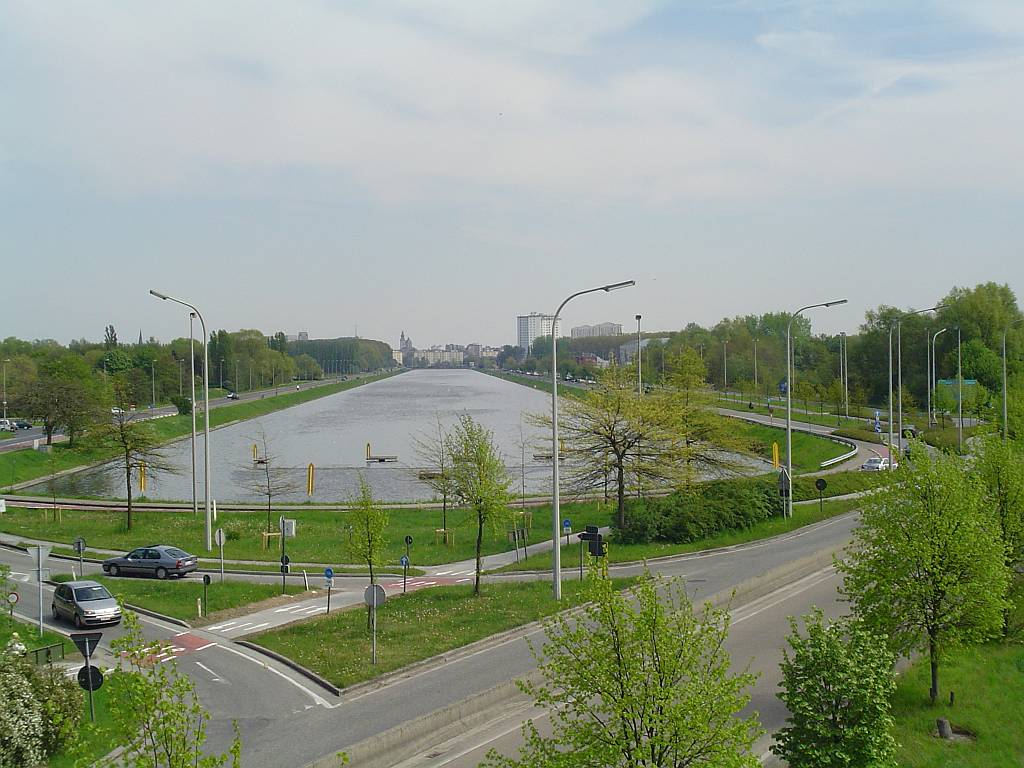
International Regatta KRC Ghent

The International regatta KRC Ghent is an international rowing regatta held by Royal Club Nautique de Gand (KRCG) in Ghent, Belgium. It is one of the oldest and largest rowing regattas held in Belgium and has been held since 1897.

== History ==
Originally called the Cluysen - Ter Donckis Regatta, it was held on Ascension Day, as traditionally people walked barefoot in the dew before sunrise and then enjoyed the first rays of spring sun in these rural areas at that time.

=== Ghent May Regatta ===
From 1888, there was also the Bootjesvaring or May - Regatta, a combination of a Sailing Regatta during the morning and rowing regatta. The audiences were from working class to aristocrats and populated both banks of the canal. It was organised by Royal Club Nautique de Gand together with Royal Sport Nautique de Gand on the Belgian - Dutch Ghent–Terneuzen Canal.

From 1906 to 1909, the sport of rowing became extremely popular in Ghent. This was after Ghent rowing associations where the first foreign teams to win the Grand Challenge Cup at Henley Royal Regatta in England. On their return to the European continent the Belgian winning team was received with the highest honour. King Leopold II granted permission for the clubs to add the title "Royal" to their club name immediately. They also decided to add additional funds to the rowing regatta. Until then, no English rowing teams had ever visited a foreign rowing regatta, however after the defeats in Henley they entered the regatta to challenge the clubs of Ghent.

=== European Rowing Championships ===
In 1913, during the World Expo of Ghent, the European Rowing Championships were held at Cluysen - Terdonck. The European Rowing Championships were highest rowing level regatta, together with the Olympic rowing regatta in those years.

=== The latest edition of 1957 ===
After the Second World War, the petrochemical industry expanded very strongly in the sea channel zone and due to the growing traffic because of the success of the Port of Ghent the regatta ended at Terdonck in 1954.

The construction of the Watersportbaan for the European Rowing Championships of 1956 was a last upsurge of old glory. During at least 15 years Ghent fell further and further away and the International Regatta of Ostend took over as annual place for Belgian rowers to be.

== Modern day event ==
Ghent May Regatta is now an international FISA rowing regatta fully organised by Royal Sport Nautique de Gand The race has been known under this name since the beginning of the 20th century. The urban Watersportbaan of Ghent is the new location for the regatta. Today, the Belgian Royal Rowing Federation, The East Flemish Rowing League, the Province of East Flanders and the Royal Sport Gent, organise the event under President Rombaut and co-organizers. Rombaut Jr. is Chairman of the Committee of the Umpires of the FISA, which together with Ghent University Rector Paul Van Cauwenberge is also the man behind the Ghent Student Regatta.

Today, the annual International Open Belgian Rowing Championships on the Watersportbaan in Ghent are still named May – Regatta by British and Irish rowers.

=== Belgian Open Sprint Cup and Triptych ===
The first Belgian Open Sprintcup of KRCG went through in 1990. The first KRCG Triptych went through in 2003.

=== Test and Trials Regatta ===
The races go through during the second weekend of September and is therefore a pronounced autumn regatta that serves as the ultimate test regatta for the National Championship boats in Hazewinkel.

== Practical ==
The race track is the Watersportbaan at Ghent, near the Flanders Sports Arena. Contest Rules:

A. The races are rowed under the regulations of the Fédération Internationale des Sociétés d'Aviron (FISA) and the Royal Belgian Rowing Federation.
B. The twenty matches of the triptych (1000, 250 and 2000 m) of cups will be provided, based on the best combined performance (the times of 1000 and 2000 m are, respectively, by 4 and 8 are shared).
The first two teams from each competition will receive a prize. Triptych Cups and mugs bill be presented Sunday in the Clubhouse. Foreign victors receive a souvenir.

== Exchange Cups ==
The Exchange Cups are:

- No. 102/202/302 - 8+ JM18 | Walton "
- No. 107/207/307 - 1x W |Femina "
- No. 108/208/308 - 2- |R. Marlier "
- No. 116/216/316 - 4- M | " Lamberty "
- No. 117/217/317 - 2x JW18 |Marie-Jeanne D'Haemers "
- No. 120/220/320 - 8+ M | Comte Lippens "
