= Students Rowing Flanders =

Belgian student rowing association

Students Rowing in Flanders is a rowing association in Flanders, Belgium, established by students in 2004. The association organizes various student clubs or higher education institutions that operate as student-run rowing clubs in Flanders.

== Rowing Clubs ==
=== Xios Rowing Team ===
The Xios Rowing Team represents XIOS University College Limburg, University of Hasselt, University College Limburg, and the Provincial University College Limburg. The team has been active since 2004 on the Albert Canal near Hasselt in the province of Limburg. In 2005, the team bought their own boats and provided rowers their own home in the Royal Yachting Club of Hasselt.

Each year, the Student Regatta Hasselt HSR draws notable public interest. The University of Hasselt also works closely together across borders with the University of Maastricht.

=== Ghent Students Rowing ===
Established in 2004, Ghent Students Rowing was a voluntary association in East Flanders at the Royal Club Nautical de Gand which was founded with the support of the Akhenaton Rowing School Foundation and the sponsorship of the Veterans Rowers Association. The team cooperated with the Dutch Federation and with support from the European Union and Benelux to provide extracurricular activities at S.R.G. and introduce students to rowing.

=== Royal Club Nautique de Gand ===
Since 1961, the Royal Club Nautique De Gand has offered rowing activities to students. The club rows on the local urban rowing lake, Watersportbaan, and on adjoining rivers and canals, such as the Coupure, Portus Ganda, and Graslei. Through the club, rowing has been promoted at local colleges, including the School of Arts and Architecture, the Catholic University, College Saint-Lieven, the Ghent University College, the Artevelde University of Applied Sciences, the University of Ghent, Ghent Students Rowing and Leuven, the M.B.A. Institute and its alumni associations.
