= List of North Sea ports =

This is a list of ports of the North Sea and its influent rivers.

Note: this list does not include ports on the Skagerrak, the Kattegat, or the English Channel.

== Belgium ==
- Antwerp
- Bruges-Zeebrugge
- Brussels
- Ghent (North Sea Port)
- Liège
- Ostend

== Denmark ==
- Aalborg
- Esbjerg
- Hanstholm
- Hirtshals
- Struer
- Hvide Sande
- Lemvig
- Løgstør
- Nykøbing Mors
- Skive
- Thisted
- Thorsminde
- Thyborøn

== France ==
- Dunkerque

== Germany ==
- Brake
- Bremen
- Bremerhaven
- Cuxhaven
- Emden
- Hamburg
- Leer
- Nordenham
- Oldenburg
- Papenburg
- Wilhelmshaven (JadeWeserPort)

== Netherlands ==
- Scheveningen
- Port of Amsterdam
- Delfzijl
- Den Helder
- Dordrecht
- Eemshaven
- Groningen
- Haarlem
- IJmuiden
- Maastricht
- Port of Rotterdam
- Terneuzen (North Sea Port)
- Utrecht
- Vlissingen (North Sea Port)

== Norway ==
- Bergen
- Egersund
- Flekkefjord
- Florø
- Haugesund
- Kopervik
- Mongstad
- Måløy
- Sandnes
- Sauda
- Stavanger
- Ålesund
- Årdalstangen

== United Kingdom ==
- Aberdeen
- Cromarty Firth
- Dover
- Felixstowe
- Grangemouth
- Grimsby
- Harwich International Port
- Immingham Dock
- Inverness
- King's Lynn
- Hull
- Leith (City of Edinburgh)
- Lerwick
- London
- Lowestoft
- New Holland, North Lincolnshire
- Orkney (including Kirkwall, Flotta, Scapa Flow, Stromness)
- Peterhead
- Shetland (Lerwick and Sullom Voe)
- Sunderland
- Teesport
- Tilbury
- Port of Tyne
- Great Yarmouth

== See also ==
- Channel Ports
- History of London - port of London
- Geography of Germany - Water transport
