= Ghent Student Regatta =

Coordinates: 51°03′16″N 3°44′02″E

The Ghent Student Regatta was a boat race for students in April 2008 at Portus Ganda in the heart of historical Ghent in Dutch-speaking Flanders, Belgium. It was an initiative of Paul Van Cauwenberge, the Rector of Ghent University, in collaboration with Ghent Students Rowing, the sports department of the City and Patrick Rombaut, Umpiring Commission Chairman of the Fédération Internationale des Sociétés d'Aviron (FISA).

Rombaut started the Sprint idea at this location back in September 2007, where his regatta team of the annual May regatta of Ghent organised a race between the rowing teams of Christ Church Boat Club of Oxford University, Henley Rowing Club, a junior team of K.R. Club Gent/Royal Club Nautique de Gand and his own KR Sport Gent 1883 eight. The race was won in 1907 with the colours and blades of K.R.Sport Gent (Royal Sport Nautique de Gand = French name at that time) and they won again in 2007 in this 200m sprint.

The idea came from the Mercedes Benz FISA World Rowing Sprints at Serpentine Lake in Hyde Park in London back in 2002. It was also a trial to bring rowing into city centers again.

There are plans to continue with the enlarged version of the event every two or three years, in the same location.

== Tradition ==
British, Anglo-Saxon, and Dutch students have also developed a rowing tradition. The Temple Challenge Cup and the Boat Race have been established as examples.

== Two races ==
The tournament was opened by an International sprint race in teams of eight by the University of Leiden, Magdalen College, Oxford, and Trinity College, Cambridge and eight rowers from Ghent made out of two of the three local open associations. A mixed race. The National race in four, done by Sport Nautique Universitaire de Bruxelles, Limburg Association (Hasselt, near Maastricht) and Ghent Students Rowing, was previously a Belgian version of the Dutch so called Non-fanatical Competition — and Regional students rowing category, organised by their NSRF and the Nationaal Overleg Orgaan Competitieroeien (NOOC).

== See also ==
- Students Rowing Flanders
