= North Sea Locks =

Complex of locks in Terneuzen, Netherlands

- Noordzeesluizen
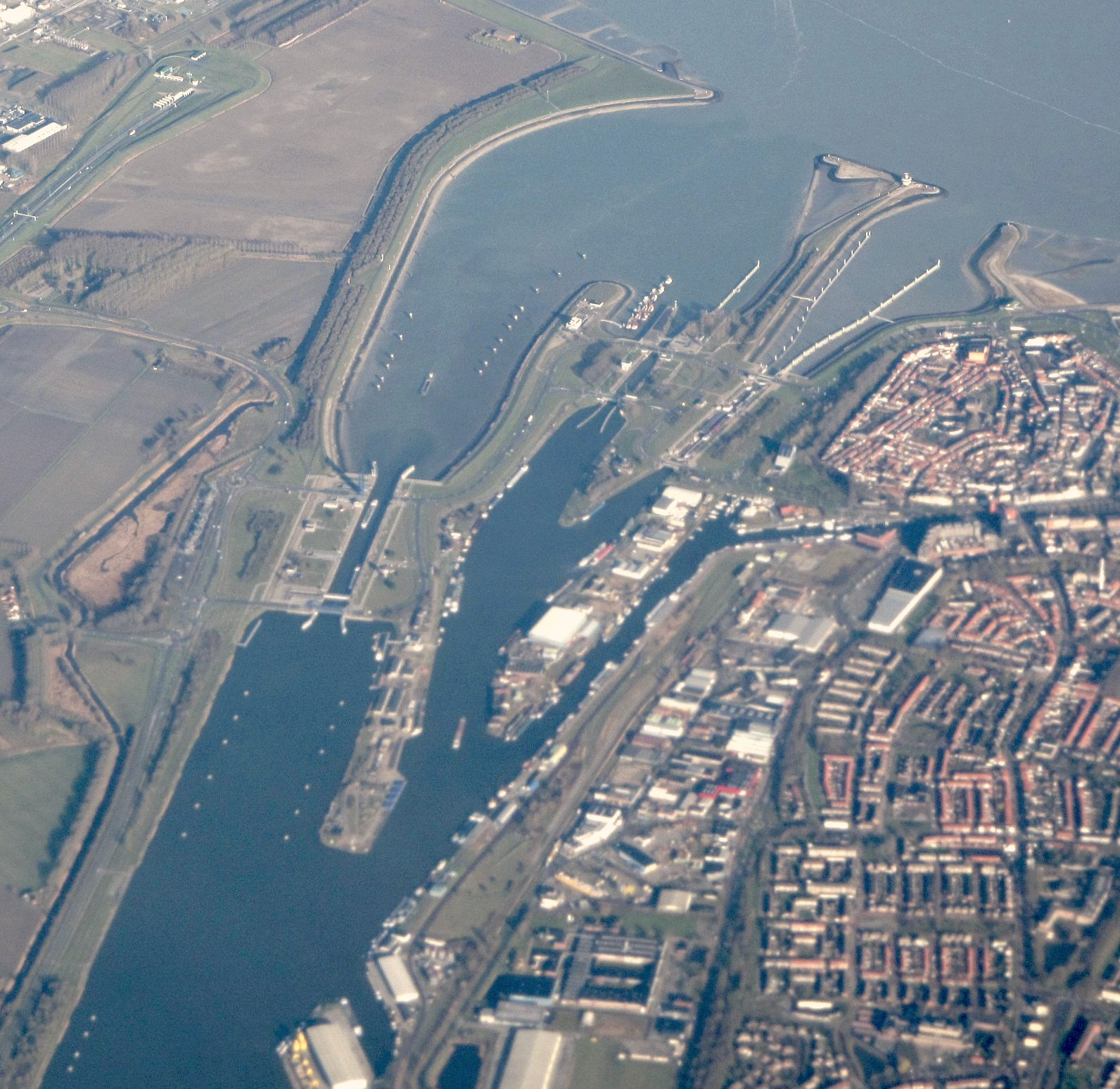
- Aerial photograph (2011) before the construction of the New Lock
- Interactive map of North Sea Locks
- 51°19′50″N 3°49′10″E
- Waterway: Ghent–Terneuzen Canal
- Country: Netherlands
- Province: Zeeland
- First built: New Lock: 2024; West Lock: 1968; East Lock: 1968
- Length: New Lock: 427 m (1,401 ft); West Lock: 290 m (950 ft); East Lock: 280 m (920 ft)
- Width: New Lock: 55 m (180 ft); West Lock: 40 m (130 ft); East Lock: 24 m (79 ft)

The North Sea Locks is a complex of three locks in Terneuzen, Netherlands forming the entrance to the Ghent–Terneuzen Canal, which extends to the Port of Ghent. It is located along the Western Scheldt estuary.

== Description ==
The North Sea Locks consist of three individual locks: the New Lock, which has a length of 427 metres (1,401 ft) and a width of 55 metres (180 ft); the West Lock, which has a length of 290 metres (950 ft) and a width of 40 metres (130 ft); and the East Lock, which has a length of 280 metres (920 ft) and a width of 24 metres (79 ft).

== History ==
Between 1825 and 1827, the canal between Ghent and Sas van Gent was extended to the Western Scheldt in Terneuzen, creating the Ghent–Terneuzen Canal. It was accessible through an eastern and western lock, with construction of the latter having started on 6 June 1826. Following an agreement between the Netherlands and Belgium, a new larger western lock was opened on 15 February 1910, with Queen Wilhelmina present.

The two countries agreed in the 1960s to modify the canal and the complex of locks. The original two locks were replaced by a new East Lock for inland navigation, the newer western lock was refurbished and renamed Middle Lock, and a new West Lock was constructed. The new complex was opened in 1968 by Queen Juliana of the Netherlands and King Baudouin of Belgium.

Calls for a larger lock started in 1968, when the latest expansion completed. Construction of the New Lock started in 2017, and it was inaugurated in October 2024, once again by both the Dutch and Belgian kings. It entered full operation on 1 August 2025.
