= VVR =

VVR may refer to:

- See LWR for VVR, the Russian class of nuclear reactor
- See List of German transport associations for Verkehrsverbund Rottweil.
- See VERITAS Software for Veritas Volume Replicator
- Vinaya Vidheya Rama, a 2019 Indian Telugu-language film
- Vereniging Veteranen Roeiers, Dutch name for the Veterans' Rowers' Association
