= René Stockman =

Belgian specialist in psychiatric caregiving

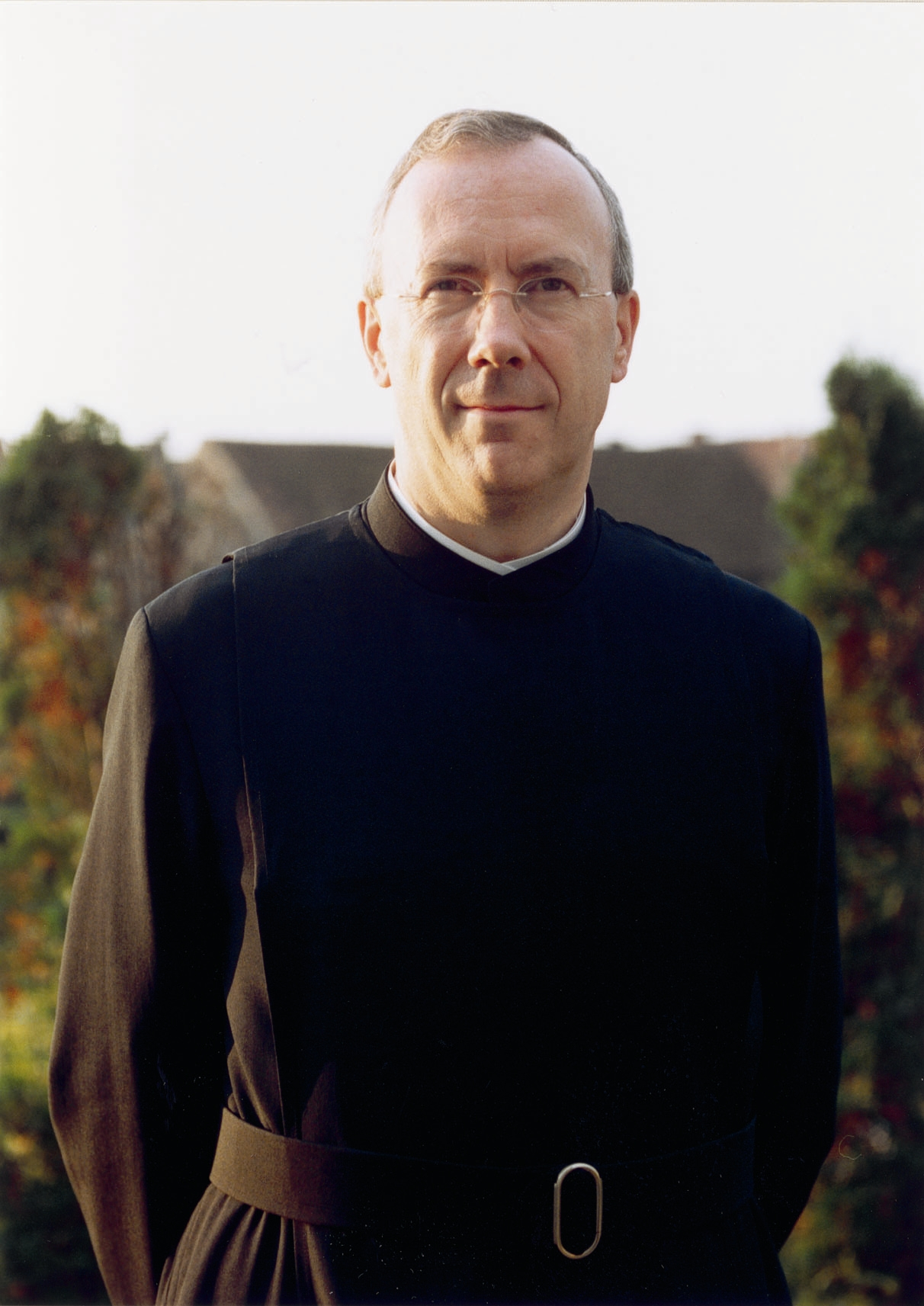
René Stockman

Brother Dr. René P. E. Stockman, F.C. (born 13 May 1954 in Assenede, Belgium) is the Superior General of the Congregation of the Brothers of Charity from 2000 to 2024. He is a Belgian specialist in psychiatric caregiving.

== Education ==
René Stockman studied at the Saint-Laurens Institute in Zelzate between 1966 and 1972. He finished grammar school with a diploma in economics.

In 1972 he joined the Congregation of the Brothers of Charity. He fulfilled the noviciate training in Maria-Aalter (1972–1973). He then started in Ghent his training as a nurse at the Higher Institute for Paramedic Professions (1973–1976).

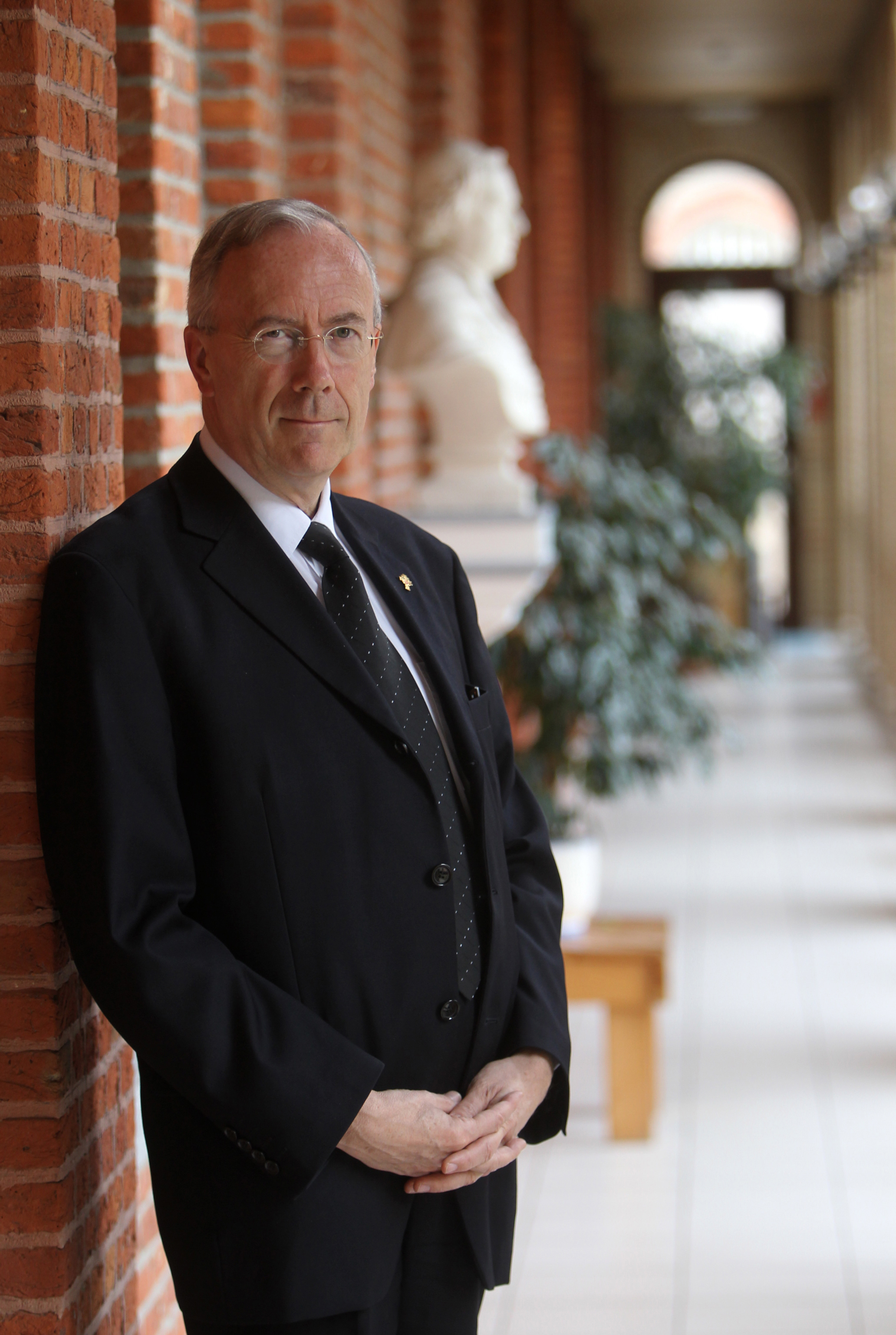
René Stockman

He continued with studies leading to a Master in medical and social sciences and management of hospitals at the University of Louvain (1977–1980). His thesis was entitled Organization of mental health-care in Rwanda and Burundi. Additionally he obtained a teaching certificate for teaching in higher secondary schools (1981), at the University of Louvain. He completed his education by obtaining a doctors degree at the Catholic University of Louvain. His thesis was entitled: The place of the religious within the mental health care and obtained high examination marks (1986).

== Professional activities ==
Brother René Stockman began his professional activities in 1976, as chief of the department of health care at the psychiatric institute of Sint-Julian Ghent (now the Dr. Guislain Institute). He pursued this mission until 1977.

From 1980 until 1987 he was director of the Institute for Psychiatric Nursing Dr. Guislain in Ghent and in 1982-1988 he was the managing director of the Institute Dr. Guislain.

In 1988 he was made the general manager of all institutions of the Brothers of Charity in Belgium which are active within the sectors of health care and orthopedagogic care. He pursued in this capacity until 1994.

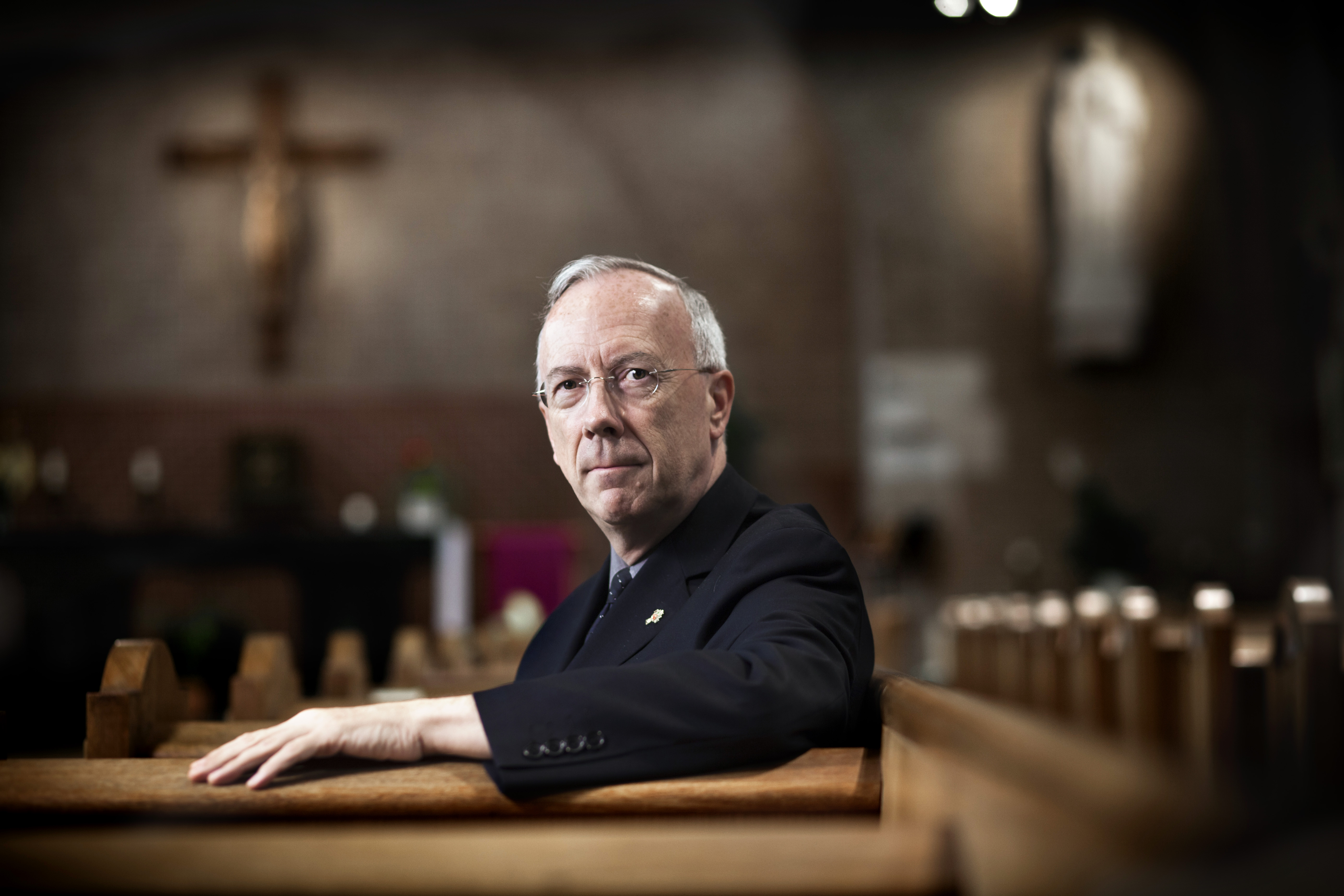
René Stockman

In 1994 he was made superior of the province Saint-Vincent (Belgium) of the Brothers of Charity. In 2000 he was elected general superior of the Brothers. From then on he resided mainly in Rome, travelling extensively throughout the world.

He was reelected in 2006 for a second term of six years, in 2012 for a third term and in 2018 for a fourth term, but in February 2023 Pope Francis relieved him of effective authority due to financial mismanagement.

== Controversy ==
In 2023, a former pedagogical director and a former Belgian police detective stated in a documentary that Stockman had tried to impede their investigation of the sexual abuse of a mentally disabled girl by a Brother of Charity. The brother was initially found guilty but was acquitted on appeal due to reasonable doubt as to whether the accused was the perpetrator. The former pedagogical director alleged that Stockman had him fired for believing the girl's mother, while the former detective accused Stockman of making veiled threats about having his wife fired from her job at a Catholic institution.

In the same documentary, Stockman denied these allegations, stating that he had only phoned the detective to request he not pick up the accused brother in a marked police car, due to his old age. He did not directly address the former pedagogical director's claim that he had been dismissed because of how he handled the complaint. He only made mention of having tried to maintain serenity in the affair and having asked his staff to do the same, which — in his words — does not mean he put the reputation of the institution above the safety of the child. In a reaction on their website, the congregation does not address these specific allegations but acknowledges in general that the name "Brothers of Charity" was mentioned several times and that a dark chapter from the history, the 1950s, 1960s, 1970s, and 1980s was highlighted. The congregation apologized for any form of sexual abuse in the past.

== Other activities ==
- 1976-2000: chief editor of the magazine Psychiatrie en Verpleging (Psychiatry and Health Care),
- from 1980 on: lecturer at the Institute of Psychiatric Health Care in Ghent,
- from 1983 on: secretary and from 1989 on chairman of the Intecongregational Centre for concerted action of health care,
- from 1984 on: director of the High School for Congregational Health care institutes,
- from 1986 on: curator of the Museum Dr. Guislain in Ghent,
- from 1986 on: director of the Education Centre Guislain Ghent,
- 1988 - 2000: director of Caritas Oost-Vlaanderen,
- 1988 - 2000: director of different health care institutions,
- 1989 - 2000: director of Verbond van Vlaamse Verzorgingsinstellingen (VVI),
- 1989 - 2000: director of Caritas Catholica Flanders,
- from 1989 on: chairman of the Committee for the missions of the Brothers of Charity and of Caraes non-governmental organization for developing aid,
- from 1990 on: editor in chief of the magazine of the Congregation Van Harte,
- from 1990 on: advisor-lecturer Faculty of medicine, Catholic University Louvain,
- from 1993 on: chairman of the non profit organization Fracaritatis VZW, centre for international cooperation,
- 1996 - 2000: chairman of the Association of Superiors of religious orders and congregations in Belgium,
- from 1997 on: member of the Supreme Council of UFSIA, Antwerp,
- from 1998 on: visiting professor EHSAL, Brussels,
- from 1998 on: visiting professor Kigali Health Institute, Kigali,
- from 2000 on: visiting professor Catholic University of America, Washington,
- from 2000 on: visiting professor Pontifical University Lateran, Rome,
- from 2001 on: editor in chief of the magazine of the congregation Deus Caritas Est.

== Honors ==
- Knight of the Order of the Holy Sepulchre, Belgian branch (1996).
- Commander in the Order of Leopold (2013)

== Publications ==
=== In English ===
- Praying with Father Triest, Broeders van Liefde, Ghent, 1992
- Neither rhyme nor reason, history of psychiatry, Museum Dr. Guislain, Ghent, 1997,
- In the school of love - retreat about our life as Brothers of Charity, October 2001
- Father Triest - 20 meditations, 2001
- Father Triest for every day, 2001
- God makes history with people, 2002
- A harbour of words bloemlezing uit de geschriften van Vader Triest, 2002
- Peter Joseph Triest. On His Way to Sainthood , Gompel&Svacina, 2019

=== In French ===
- Ni rime ni raison, histoire de la psychiatrie, Museum Dr. Guislain, Ghent, 1997
- Le Père Triest - 20 meditations, 2001
- Le Père Triest au quotidien
- A l’abri des paroles bloemlezing uit de geschriften van Vader Triest
- A la lumière de Marie, Halewijn, Anvers, 2004
- Pierre Joseph Triest. En chemin vers la sainteté, Gompel&Svacina, 2019

=== In Dutch ===
- Plaats van de religieuzen in de geestelijke gezondheidszorg, Uitgeverij Acco, Leuven, 1983
- Deontologie voor verpleegkundigen, Uitgeverij Aurelia - Paramedica, Gent, 1984
- Mijmeringen bij de geschiedenis van het Guislaininstituut, Uitgave Museum Dr. Guislain, Gent, 1987
- De Kerk en het verstoorde leven, Uitgeverij Lannoo, Tielt, 1988,
- Geen rede mee te rijmen. Geschiedenis van de psychiatrie, Uitgeverij Aurelia-Paramedica, 1989
- Beroepsethiek voor de verpleegkundige, Uitgeverij Aurelia-Paramedica, 1990
- Hoopvol op weg - Toekomstig beheer van congregationele gezondheidsinstellingen, Uitgeverij Acco, 1991
- Vastenheiligen, wondermeisjes en hongerkunstenaars, Uitgave Museum Dr. Guislain, Gent, 1991
- Bidden met Vader Triest, Broeders van Liefde, Gent, 1992
- Prof. André Prims, zoals we hem kennen en waarderen (Festschrift for André Prims)
- Het beheer van congregationele gezondheidsinstellingen: historische achtergronden en toekomstperspectieven
- De vis heeft geen weet van het water, Een ethiek van het onvolkomene, Uitgeverij Pelckmans, 1995
- Het welzijn van de zorg, Acco, Leuven, 1996
- Zorg op maat en met een gelaat, Uitgeverij Garant, 1996
- Gezocht Gezicht, Uitgave Museum Dr. Guislain, Gent, 1996
- Met recht en rede - Waanzin tussen Wet en Kabinet, Uitgave Museum Dr. Guislain, Gent, 1997
- Bij de Heer zijn: gebedenboek van de Broeders van Liefde, Lannoo, Tielt, 1997
- Uw hand in mijn hand - Gebeden voor onderweg, Lannoo, Tielt, 1997
- De goede mijnheer Triest: een biografie van Kanunnik Peter Joseph Triest, 1998
- Het beroepsgeheim in de zorgverleningssector, Uitg. Intersentia, redactie, 1998
- Bouwen aan een spiritualiteit van gelukkig zijn, 4 audio-cassettes uitgegeven door het Dr. Anna Terruwe Centrum.
- Religieus leven nu en morgen, in: Redactie verslagboek VHOB-URB-colloquium 6-7/11/1998
- De maat van de liefde is liefde zonder maat, Davidsfonds, Leuven, 1999
- Van nar tot patiënt, Davidsfonds, Leuven, 2000
- Waar is in een bureaucratische cultuur de patiënt gebleven?, in: Hoe komt het dat ethici verschillend denken? Schijnwerper op de cultuur - Dr. W.J. Eijk, Dr. J.P.M Lelkens (ed.), Colombia, Oestgeest (NL), 2000, Hoofdstuk IX: p. 143-151.
- Uit handen gegeven, icoon van de schepping, Halewijn, Antwerpen. 2000
- Denken voor Vlaanderen - Over levenskwaliteit, Davidsfonds, Leuven, 2001, p. 75-88
- Vader Triest - 20 meditaties, 2001
- Vader Triest voor elke dag, 2001
- A. Demeulemeester: een schildersleven. Ode aan de vriendschap, 2001, p. 83-87.
- Rede en waanzin. Museum Dr. Guislain. De ontwikkeling van de morele behandeling in België of het ontstaan van de gestichtspsychiatrie, 2001, p. 141-185
- In woorden geborgen - bloemlezing uit de geschriften van Vader Triest, 2002
- Maria in het licht - Icoon van het leven van de Moeder Gods, Halewijn, Antwerpen, 2003
- Ubi Caritas - Godgewijd leven, Carmelitana, Gent, 2003
- Triest, een vader voor velen, Brothers of Charity Publications, Gent, 2003
- Uitdagingen voor de paus, in: Habemus Papam, het profiel van de volgende paus, Rik Torfs en Kurt Martens (ed.), Leuven, Davidsfonds, 2004, p. 128-132
- Liefde en barmhartigheid als weg van de bevestiging, in: Bevestiging, erfdeel en opdracht, Uitg. Damon Budel, 2004, p. 396-415.
- Schatten van mensen, Halewijn, Antwerpen, 2004
- Weten in wiens dienst ik sta, in: Guido Deblaere, innovator en inspirator, Lannoo, Tielt, 2004, p. 99-102
- Leiderschap in dienstbaarheid, de spiritualiteit van het leidinggeven, Lannoo, Tielt, 2004
- Mag ik je broeder noemen? Religieuze broeders voor vandaag, Halewijn, Antwerpen, 2004
- Met de ogen van je hart, Halewijn, Antwerpen, 2004
- Triest Tour, 2005
- Brandde ons hart niet?, Davidsfonds, 2006
- Over een God die Liefde is, Halewijn, 2006
- Vincentius a Paulo, 2006
- Liefde in actie. 200 jaar Broeders van Liefde, Davidsfonds, 2007
- Pro Deo, Pelckmans, 2008
- Voor God alleen, Pelckmans, 2008
- Vincentius achterna, onze voorkeursoptie voor de armen, Halewijn, 2009
- Naar den Congo. 100 jaar Broeders van Liefde in Congo, Halewijn, 2011
- Laat niet verloren gaan één mensenkind, Gompel&Svacina, 2018
- Zoektocht naar de ware vreugde. Een wandeling doorheen de zaligsprekingen, Gompel&Svacina, 2019
- Petrus Jozef Triest. Op weg naar heiligheid, Gompel&Svacina, 2019

=== In Romanian ===
- Manual de nursing psichiatric, Bucuresti, 2004
