= Frères de la Charité =

Frères de la charité may refer to the following religious orders:

- Brothers of Charity, founded in 1807 in Ghent;
- Brothers Hospitallers of Saint John of God, founded 1582; commonly called Frères de la charité in France 1601-1789
