= Brothers of Charity =

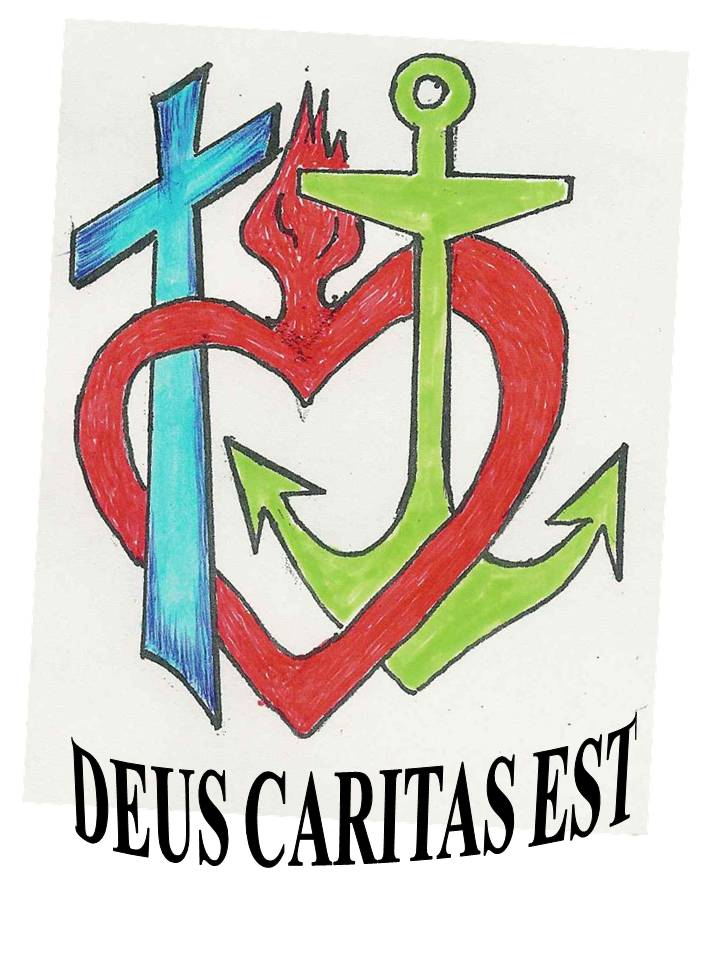
- Abbreviation: F.C.
- Formation: c. AD 1807; 219 years ago
- Founder: Petrus Joseph Triest
- Type: Lay Religious Congregation of Pontifical Right (for Men)
- Headquarters: Via G.B. Pagano, 35, 00167 Roma, Italy
- Members: 600 members (2016)
- Website: brothersofcharity.org

The Brothers of Charity are an international religious institute of Religious Brothers and associate members at the service of the people most in need in the field of education and health care. The institute was founded in 1807 by Peter Joseph Triest in Ghent, Belgium. He also founded three other religious congregations inspired by Vincentian spirituality. The congregation's patron saint is St. Vincent de Paul. Today the Brothers maintain a presence in 30 countries.

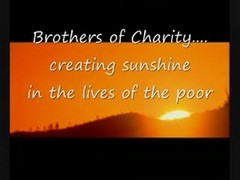
Mission

== History ==
The first work of the Brothers of Charity was caring for elderly men at Byloke. In 1809, Brother Jan Porter of the Byloke Hospice started to teach the alphabet to some street urchins at the gate. The first school was established in 1814. In 1815 the brothers began to tend to patients with mental illness that had been confined and restrained in the cellar of the Gerard-the-Devil castle. The name "Brothers of Charity" was given to the Brothers by the people of Ghent where they first served amongst the poor and the neglected elderly. The services provided by the Brothers of Charity were appreciated by the people and Government of Belgium, and in a short time the community developed and expanded.

In 1820, a Brother novice was sent to Namur in order to take a teacher training course with the Brothers of the Christian Schools. In 1825, Br. Benedict, the principal of the primary school in Bruges, translated and published a book on education by Jean-Baptiste de La Salle.

In 1823 two Brothers were sent to Prof. H.D. Guyot's institute in Groningen in order to prepare the start of the school for the deaf at the Byloke. In 1825 and 1835, education for deaf children was started in Ghent and in Brussels respectively. From the very beginning, the Brussels institute also admitted blind children. At the Brothers' orphanages, much attention was paid to teaching the children a trade; this trend was continued later with people with a disability. In 1840 the brothers began to provide services to people with an intellectual disability. From 1877, children with an intellectual disability were accommodated in a special institute in Ghent.

== Expansion ==
The work of the brothers attracted the attention of foreign bishops. The American province was founded in 1865 with the arrival of five Belgian brothers in Montreal; the congregation was incorporated in 1869 under the title of "Brothers of Charity of Vincent de Paul of Montreal". The Brothers of Charity directed, among other establishments, the Montreal Reformatory School and Protectory; the S. Benoit-Joseph Labre Insane Asylum and S. Philippe de Neri Retreat at Longue-Pointe near Montreal; the Mont S. Bernard Commercial and Scientific College at Sorel, P.Q.; the S. Frederic Academic School at Drummondville.

The Brothers of Charity established a presence in England in 1882. The following year they opened their first services in Ireland to provide for mental health needs.

The constitutions were approved and confirmed by Pope Leo XIII on 4 July 1899. Peter Joseph Triest, titular canon of the Church of St. Bavon in Ghent, on account of his services in the cause of charity, was called the Vincent de Paul of his country, and was three times decorated by royal hands with the highest civic orders of the land. After his death his countrymen erected a superb mausoleum to his honor in Brussels, the Belgian capital.

In 1911, the first mission took place in Democratic Republic of Congo; thereafter, new houses were established in South Africa, Rwanda and Indonesia (1929), Burundi (1938), India (1936/1994), Peru (1962), Italy (1967), Japan and Papua New Guinea (1970), The Philippines (1981), Sri Lanka (1989), Pakistan (1990), Tanzania and Kivu (1994), Ivory Coast (1996), Brazil (1997), Romania (1999), Kenya (2002), Vietnam (2004), China (2008), Zambia (2009), Ethiopia (2010), Central Africa Republic (2011) etc.

== Ministries ==
Care for the elderly

The first Brothers started with the care of elderly men; this first apostolic work continues even today and has developed specializations for patients with Alzheimer and other types of senile dementia.

Education

In 1996, in St Vincent Region in Belgium, instruction was given in 33 schools for mainstream nursery and primary education serving 8781 pupils with 820 staff; 15 mainstream secondary schools serving 7121 students with 1278 staff; and 7 special primary schools and 8 special trade schools serving 1253 students with 316 staff. The brothers are also involved in educational projects in other countries.

Care for people with a physical disability

Around the 2000 BOC had eight orthopedagogical institutes in Belgium: two for people who had a serious intellectual disability, four for people with a mild intellectual disability, one for people who were hearing-impaired and physically disabled, and another one for blind, deaf and hearing-impaired people. A total of 1700 staff care for 2600 people with some form of physical or intellectual disability. In mission countries, as well as in Ireland and the U.K., the Brothers of Charity Services are responsible for the administration of several support services for people with an intellectual disability. Bro Ebergist De Deyne published a book on "L'éducation sensorielle chez les enfants anormaux" in 1922; it broke new ground in special education.

The Brothers of Charity, branded as "Best Lives", offer support services to over 500 people with learning disabilities across the North West of England. The Congregation, branded as "Corlann", is one of the largest providers in Ireland of services for people with an intellectual disability.

Mental health care

The Brothers of Charity have been involved in the care for people with a mental illness in Belgium since 1815. They were guided by Dr Joseph Guislain, the first Belgian psychiatrist and doctor-in-chief of the two existing mental hospitals in Ghent. In 1828 he and Triest wrote a new internal regulations for them. A brand new psychiatric institute began in 1857 and is still working today. Dr J. Guislain Museum was inaugurated within the walls of this institute: it offers a survey of the evolution in the care for people with a mental health illness and highlights the work of Dr J. Guislain and Canon P.J. Triest. From 1820 on the Brothers took over or erected psychiatric institutes in many countries. Around 2000 the Brothers of Charity were caring for 5000 patients with 5100 staff in 13 institutes in Belgium. Congo, Rwanda and Burundi each have a psychiatric center. More recently, projects have been set up in India, The Ivory Coast, South Africa, Romania and Tanzania.

Developmental aid

Although the Brothers of Charity were not a missionary Congregation by definition, five Brothers were sent to the then Belgian Congo, namely to Lusambo, in 1911. Later on missionary Brothers settled in Rwanda and Burundi; in 1928 the first two houses were established in Transvaal (S. Africa). Dutch Brothers settled in Indonesia in particular, and in India (1936) for a few years. A house was founded in Cuba in 1950. Thereafter Peru, Japan, New Guinea, The Philippines, Pakistan, Sri Lanka, The Ivory Coast, India, Tanzania, Brazil, Vietnam, Nicaragua, etc. got one or more institutes managed by the Brothers of Charity. Originally, all mission work of the Brothers focused on education, but in recent years services for people with a disability and people with a mental illness have been developed.

=== List of Superiors General ===
1. Canon Peter Joseph Triest (1807–1811)
2. Brother Bernardus De Noter (1811–1832)
3. Brother Aloysius Bourgois (1832–1862)
4. Brother Gregorius Banckaert (1862–1865)
5. Brother Aloysius Bourgois (1865–1871)
6. Brother Nicolaas Vercauteren (1871–1876)
7. Brother Amedeus Stockmans (1876–1922)
8. Brother Filemon S'papen (1922–1945)
9. Brother Warner de Beuckelaer (1946–1958)
10. Brother Koenraad Reichgelt (1958–1967)
11. Brother Agnel Degadt (1967–1976)
12. Brother Waldebert Devestel (1976–2000)
13. Brother René P. E. Stockman (2000–2024)

=== Timeline ===
- 1986 Beginning of a close cooperation between the three TRIEST congregations on the 150th anniversary of his death.
- 1990 There is an acceleration of the international development of the "Services of the Brothers of charity" in Europe and Asia.
- 1995 Official acknowledgment of the BOC by the United Nations Organization.

== Structure and government ==
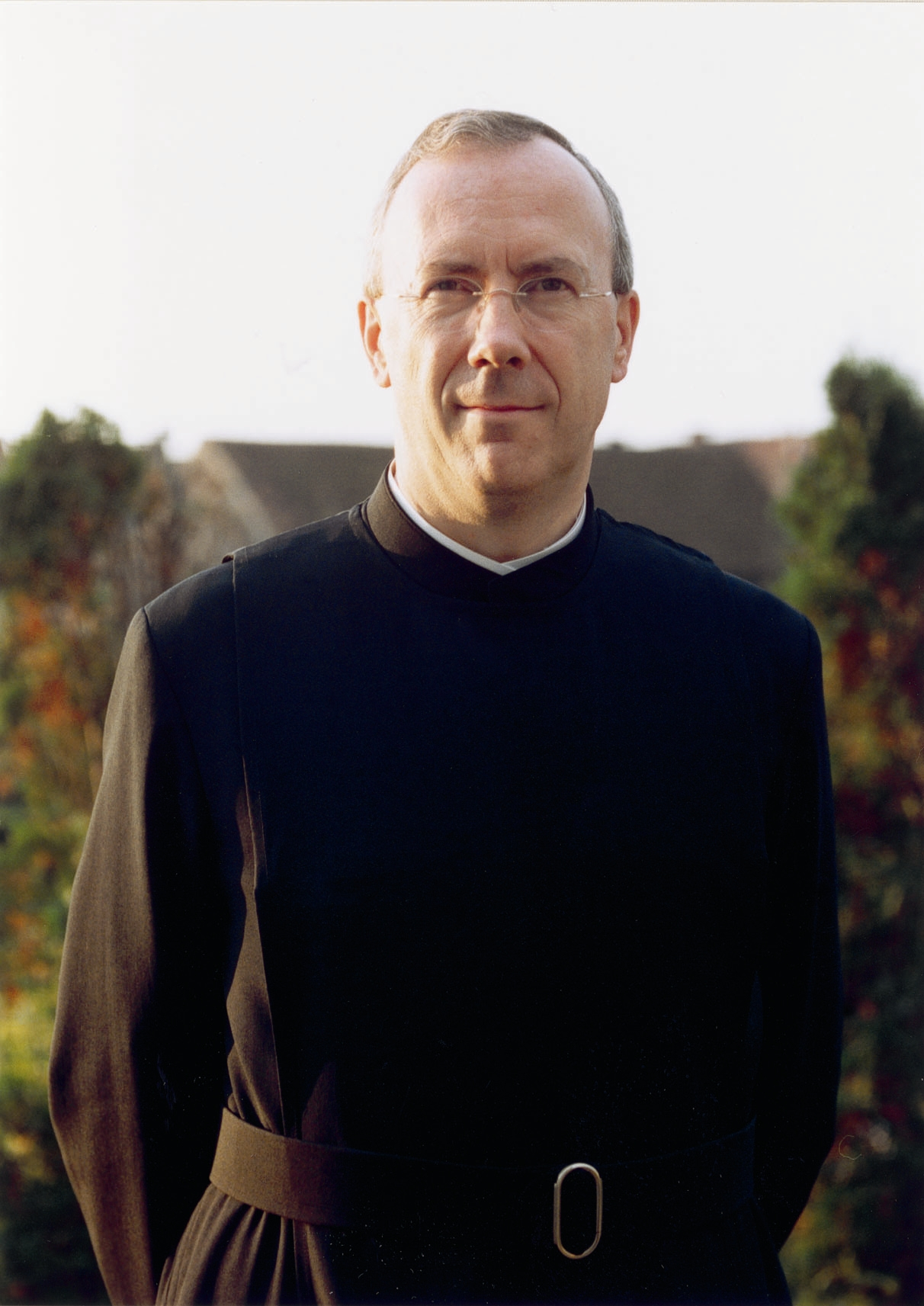
René Stockman, superior general 2000-2024

Originally based in Ghent, the administration was transferred in Rome in 1967. As of 2011, there were about 700 brothers working in about thirty countries. The brothers take vows of poverty, chastity and obedience. The International Novitiate is in Nairobi, Kenya.

The Congregation is divided into four administrative provinces that correspond with the continents: Europe, the Americas, Asia and Africa. These four provinces represent a total of 14 regions that correspond in turn with the countries where the brothers are present. The superior general is elected for a term of six years by the general chapter and he runs the Congregation with the help of the general council, and the provincial and regional superiors. In the United States, they have houses in Philadelphia and Washington, D.C.

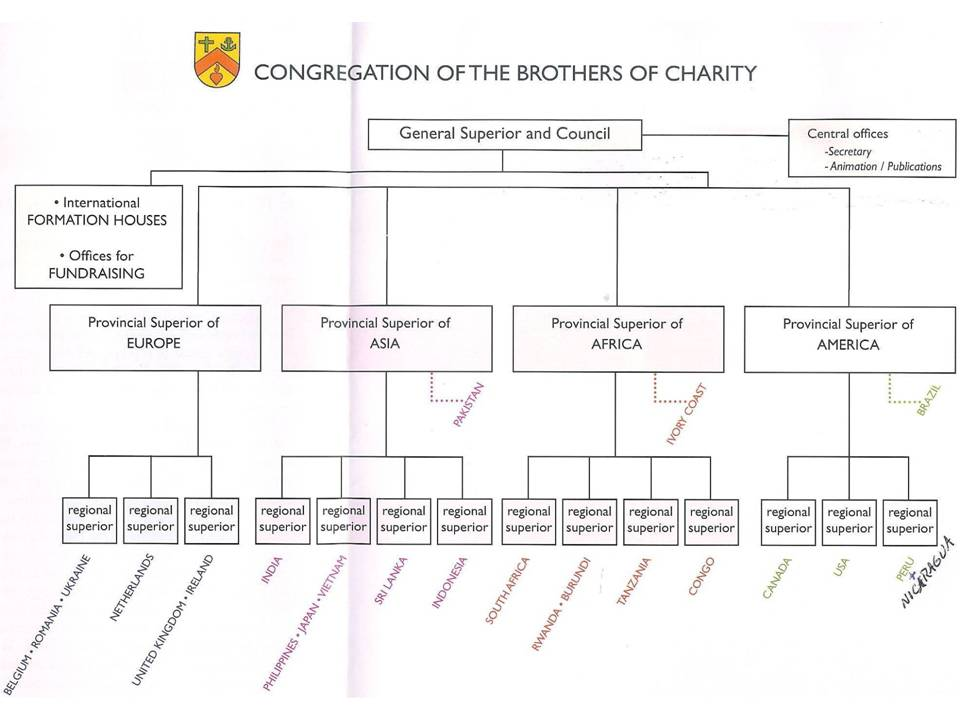
Organigram

The congregation observes the legal norms of each country and takes the form of a legal person as provided in the different countries. In general, the regional superior and his regional council accept legal responsibility in each country, they legally represent the congregation.

The general superior receives his authority directly from the Supreme Pontiff through the Congregation of Consecrated Life. For all matters concerning religious life, the congregation is under the jurisdiction of the Catholic Church, as expressed in the Canon Law. In February 2023, Pope Francis relieved superior general René Stockman of effective authority, leaving him nominally in place until the end of his term in 2024.

In order to open a house, the congregation has to ask the permission of the local ordinary (bishop). He cannot intervene directly in the organization of the congregation, but has to contact the general superior. To close a house, the congregation has to inform the local bishop.

As an apostolic congregation, the Brothers of Charity have developed a clear mission as a concretization of their charism. In order to develop their social engagement in collaboration with lay co-workers, they share this mission with them, so as to maintain the spirit of charity in their works.

In each country, the regional superior is the chairman of the board of the foundation, and the regional councilors are the members. If necessary, the region can develop another board or possibly several boards for the development of the social engagement.

The congregation has 150 associate members, officially recognized by the Church and participating in the spiritual patrimony of the congregation. Some of them have a responsibility in the social engagement of the congregation.

In order to develop the social engagement, the congregation has some 15,000 lay co-workers worldwide (11,000 in Belgium), participating in the social projects and sharing the mission of the congregation. The Brothers of Charity have consultative status to the United Nations' Department of Economic and Social Affairs.

In order to develop fund raising, the congregation has a foundation called Caraes, based in Belgium, the Netherlands and Italy. They have the possibility to offer tax exemption in these countries and in the United States.

Each region has its own capital, budget and bookkeeping for the development of religious life and the social engagement. In many countries, the activities are funded by the government and are monitored by them. For those countries where the government does not support the activities sufficiently, the congregation develops solidarity between the different parts of the congregation.

== Child abuse ==
The history of the Brothers of Charity also bears the scars of decades of sexual abuse within the Roman Catholic Church.

A member of the congregation has been cited as committing a number of child abuse offences in Ireland, including the abuse of children with an intellectual disability. This abuse is detailed in the McCoy Report. The congregation has paid compensation for this abuse via the redress process.

In Belgium, offences within the Church have been documented by the "Commission Adriaenssens" – named after its chairman, the Belgian psychiatrist Peter Adriaenssens. In 2011, Superior General René Stockman stated before the special parliamentary committee in Belgium that he was aware of fifteen cases of sexual abuse of minors within his congregation.

In a 2023 documentary series titled Godvergeten (Forgotten by God), the Coghe family testified about their fight for the recognition of the abuse of their disabled daughter in an institution of the Brothers of Charity. In the same documentary, a former pedagogical director of a Brothers' school and a former police officer testified that Stockman discouraged them from investigating a complaint of sexual abuse against a priest who was found guilty by the Kortrijk court in the first instance but was acquitted on appeal on the basis of doubt whether he was the individual who had committed the abuse. The police officer said that Stockman had hinted his wife might lose her job at a Catholic institution. In response to the documentary, The congregation acknowledges that the Brothers of Charity were mentioned several times in the documentary, which had highlighted a dark chapter in their history, from the 1950s through to the 1980s, and apologizes for any form of sexual abuse in the past.

== Bibliography ==
- Eugeen Geysen, Het verdienstelijke leven van Petrus-Jozef Triest. Gent.
- Koenraad Reichgelt, The Brothers of Charity, (1807–1888).
- Koenraad Reichgelt, The Brothers of Charity (1888–1922).
- René Stockman, Charity in action, 200 years Brothers of Charity, BOC Publications, Gent, 2009.
- René Stockman, De Kerk en het verstoorde leven.
- René Stockman, Ethos of the Brothers of Charity, Brothers of Charity Publications, Stropstraat 119, B-9000 Gent, Copyright 2002, revised 2006.
- René Stockman, Good Father Triest: A Biography on Canon Peter Joseph Triest, Belgium. ISBN 90-801940-5-0
