= Wim Van Belleghem =

Belgian rower (1963–2026)

Personal information
- Born: 10 June 1963 Bruges, Belgium
- Died: 8 January 2026 (aged 62)
Medal record
Men's rowing
Representing Belgium
World Championships
Gold medal – first place	1987 Copenhagen	Lwt single scull
Silver medal – second place	1989 Bled	Lwt single scull
Silver medal – second place	1990 Tasmania	Lwt single scull
Bronze medal – third place	1991 Vienna	Lwt single scull

Wim Van Belleghem (10 June 1963 – 8 January 2026) was a Belgian rower from Koolkerke near Bruges. He won the World Championships lightweight class single scull in 1987. After Polydore Veirman of the Royal Club Nautique de Gand, and Eveline Peleman of Royal Sport Nautique de Gand he is the most important Belgian single sculler of all time.

== Biography ==
Van Belleghem was born in Bruges on 10 June 1963. He was world champion in the lightweight single sculls at the 1987 World Rowing Championships in Copenhagen. At the Olympic Games in Seoul (1988), he partnered Alain Lewuillon from Brussels, the Belgian national assistant-coach, in the coxless pairs. They came fourth in the final just one tenth of a second short of the bronze and Lewuillon had some shoe problems during that race. Van Belleghem also won silver medals in the single sculls in the 1989 and 1990 World Rowing Championships, and a bronze medal in 1991. In 1991, he won the Diamond Challenge Sculls at Henley Royal Regatta in single scull open category racing for Royal Club Nautique de Gand. Van Belleghem was coached by Jens Mac Marren (S), Yvan Vanier (NL), Mike Spracklen, and Riszard Kedjiersky (P) among others.

Formerly a dealer for Aylings Rowing Boats in Belgium, he ran a transport company and a car showroom in Bruges. Van Belleghem died on 8 January 2026, at the age of 62.
