= Ghent Bio-Energy Valley =

Belgian joint initiative

The Ghent Bio-Energy Valley (Dutch: Gent Bio-energievallei) is a joint initiative, started in 2005, of Ghent University, the city of Ghent, the Port of Ghent, the Development Agency East Flanders, and a number of industrial companies. The initiative aims at the development of biofuels and bio-enzymes. It is an initiative of Professor Wim Soetaert of the university and aiming towards a bio-based economy.

The initiative is centered on:

- Stimulation of technological innovation
- Industrial integration and clustering
- Public acceptance and sensibilisation.

== See also ==
- European Biofuels Technology Platform
