= Ghent May Regatta =

Rowing regatta

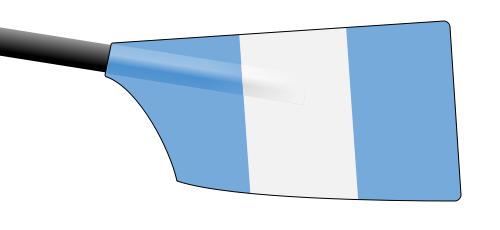

Event information
- Race area: Watersportbaan
- Countries: Belgium and the Netherlands
- Distance: 2 kilometers

The Ghent May Regatta, founded in 1889, is one of the largest rowing regattas in Belgium and the Netherlands. It is organised by Royal Sport Nautique de Gand, and was one of the first foreign co-winners of the Grand Challenge Cup. Eveline Peleman is a member of the club.
