= Petrus Joseph Triest =

Belgian Roman Catholic prelate

Venerable Petrus Josephus Triest Canon (priest)
- Canonis St Bavonis
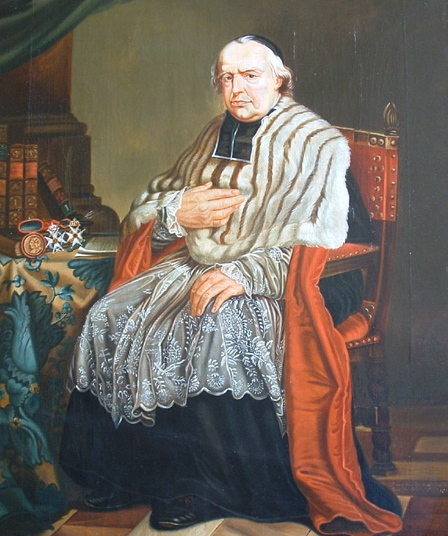
- Canon Triest
- Church: Roman Catholic
- Other post: Superior general Brothers of Charity.

Orders
- Ordination: 10 June 1786 by Cardinal de Franckenberg

Personal details
- Born: 31 August 1760 Brussels
- Died: 24 June 1836 (aged 75) Ghent
- Buried: Lovendegem
- Education: University of Louvain

Peter Joseph Triest (1760–1836) was a prelate of the Diocese of Ghent. He is known for his foundations of religious communities in this diocese, and has been called "the St. Vincent de Paul of Belgium". Pope Francis authorised Triest's declaration as venerable in April 2025.

== Career ==
Triest was born in Brussels, the ninth of 14 children of Jan and Cecilia Mello Triest. His father was a blacksmith and ironmonger. Petrus was educated at the Jesuit College of St Michael and then at the Latin school in Geel. Saint Dymphna, patron saint of the mentally ill, is particularly honoured in Geel, the site of her martyrdom.

He obtained the degree of Bachelor of Philosophy from the University of Louvain, then entered the Major Seminary, Mechelen, and was ordained priest in 1786 by Cardinal de Frankenberg. As a seminarian he was noted for his devotion to the Sacred Heart and great compassion for the needy and sick. He was made vicar of Hanswijk in Mechelen in 1792. In 1795 Triest caught typhus while tending the sick during an outbreak at the military hospital, but he recovered.

When Belgium was annexed to France in 1795, Triest refused the Republican Oath and went into hiding. For some months, he was only able to administer the sacraments clandestinely. After giving viaticum to the dying wife of a brigadier of gendarmes, he received a private assurance that he would not be arrested. In 1797 he was appointed parish priest at Ronse. After the Napoleonic Concordat of 1801, the dioceses were re-established, and Ronse became part of the diocese of Ghent. At the request of the new bishop of Ghent, Étienne Fallot de Beaumont, Triest was transferred to his authority by incardination. Soon after being publicly established in the parish, Triest founded a home for orphaned girls.

In 1803, Triest was transferred to Lovendegem, after getting into trouble in Ronse by performing a marriage service that did not fully correspond to the new French legal prescriptions. In Lovendegem he formed the Sisters of Charity of Jesus and Mary to tend to the poor and sick. His motto was Deus Providevit (God will provide). In 1805, Triest was requested to bring the sisters to the former Ter Hage Abbey in Ghent and expand their apostolate to care for the terminally ill. Napoleon gave them formal recognition as hospital sisters; they received pontifical approval in 1816.

Triest was made Canon of the Chapter of St Bavo's Cathedral and served on the Almhouses Commission. He also served on the Poor Relief Committee. In 1807, Triest became director of Bijloke Hospital, and founded the Hospital Brothers of Saint Vincent, to care for poor elderly men. The congregation would later take the name Brothers of Charity. Both congregations undertook the care of the mentally ill housed in the crypts of Devil's Castle, an old fortress built to guard the port. Triest sent a small group of brothers to Froidmont to work at the psychiatric hospital of Saint Charles. In 1825, they opened a school for deaf boys in Ghent.

Triest emphasized the importance of a good formation, both religious and professional. The rules he wrote for his congregations joined contemplation to active service and show a distinct Cistercian influence. He did not hesitate to send members to France or the Netherlands for additional training in their various ministries. He worked with physician Joseph Guislain to devise in-house training for those working with the mentally ill. In 1828 Guislain became head of the psychiatric hospitals of Ghent, and with Triest, wrote a new internal regulation for them.

With the departure of the Alexian Brothers, who made home visits to the sick and buried the dead, city officials asked Triest to establish another congregation to fill the need. In 1823 he founded the Congregation of the Brothers of Saint John of God to provide home care; and in 1835, the Sisters of the Childhood of Jesus to care for foundlings.

Triest died 24 June 1836 in Ghent. He was buried in the parish cemetery at Lovendegem with a modest tombstone. In 1846 the government installed a marble memorial in Brussels Cathedral.

On 26 August 2001 the Process for the Beatification of the Servant of God Peter Joseph Triest was solemnly opened in Ghent Cathedral. On 14 April 2025, Pope Francis recognised Triest as venerable.

== Honours ==
- 1807: Honorary Canon of Saint-Bavo.
- 1818: Knight of the Order of Orange-Nassau.
- 1833: Knight of the Order of Leopold, personally invested by King Leopold I.

== Bibliography ==
- Pierre De Decker, Levensbeschryving van Mijnheer den Kanonink Triest, Ghent, 1836
- Goswin de Stassart, "Pierre-Joseph Triest", in Biographie Universelle, Brussels, 1846
- "Monument élevé à la mémoire de Mr le chanoine Triest, dans l'église des SS. Michel et Gudule", Messager des sciences historiques, Ghent, 1850.
- A. M. Bocklandt, Kanunnik Triest, stichter van de Congregatie van de Zusters van Liefde van Jezus en Maria. Zijn Leven, zijn Geest, zijn Werken, Brussels, 1926 (In French translation as Vie et esprit du chanoine Triest, Brussels, 1928).
- G. Van den Gheyn, "Pierre-Joseph Triest", in Biographie Nationale de Belgique, Académie Royale de Belgique, Brussels, 1932, vol. 25, col. 634–638.
- K. Reichgelt & L. Cnockaert, Kanunnik Petrus-Jozef Triest. Een levensschets, Menen, 1960
- J. Spanhove, "E. H. Petrus-Jozef Triest, desservant van Asse in 1791", Eigen Schoon en De Brabander, 1963, pp. 273–292
- Orest Claeys, "Petrus-Jozef Triest, pastoor te Ronse, 1797–1803", Annalen van de Geschiedkundige kring van Ronse, 1972, pp. 145–169.
- Lucienne Cnockaert, Pierre-Joseph Triest, le Vincent de Paul Belge, Leuven, 1974
- Encyclopedic Dictionary of Religion, Philadelphia-Washington, D.C. 1979, 3567.
- Donald Joyal, The Charism and Spirituality of Peter Joseph Triest, Rome, Gregorian Pontifical University, 1982.
- E. Geysen, Het verdienstelijk leven van Petrus-Jozef Triest in herinnering gebracht bij een bezoek aan monumenten en gebouwen. Triestrooute 1986, Ghent, 1986
- Annuario Pontificio 1997, Vaticaan, 1997, pp. 1472 en 1512.
- René Stockman, De goede mijnheer Triest, een biografie van kanunnik Petrus Jozef Triest, Ghent, 1998 (also: Good Father Triest, A biography on Canon Peter Joseph Triest, Belgium. ISBN 9080194050.
- Baudouin Walckiers, Filiations lignagères bruxelloises contemporaines, Brussels, 1999.
- Andries Van den Abeele, "De beginjaren van de Broeders van Liefde. Problemen van chronologie betreffende de aangestelde economen en oversten (december 1807 – november 1810)", Helpende Handen, 2001.
- René Stockman, Ethos of the Brothers of Charity, Ghent, 2002, revised 2006.
- René Stockman, in collaboration with Andries Van den Abeele, Liefde in actie. 200 jaar Broeders van Liefde, Davidsfonds, Leuven, 2006.
