= Royal Sport Nautique de Gand =

Koninklijke Roeivereniging Sport Gent (KRSG)
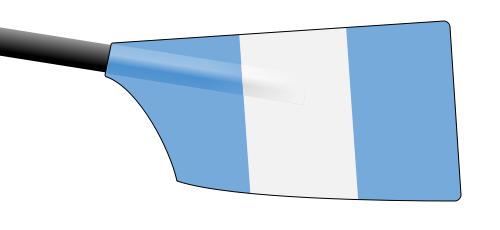
- Location: Ghent, Belgium
- Coordinates: 51°02′50.8″N 3°42′12.9″E
- Home water: Watersportbaan
- Founded: 1883
- Former names: Sport Nautique de Gand, Royal Sport Nautique de Gand
- Key people: Patrick Rombaut (President)
- Website: www.krsg.be

Events
- Ghent May Regatta

Distinctions
- Henley Royal Regatta Grand Challenge Cup winner in 1907

Royal Sport Nautique de Gand, today named Koninklijke Roeivereniging Sport Gent (or KRSG), is a rowing club from Ghent, Belgium established in 1883 as the fourth Ghent-based club.

== International successes ==
Rita Defauw has three silver (1986, 1987 and 1989) and one bronze (1990) medal(s) as well as a ninth place at the 1988 Olympic Games.

Frank Mangelschots has won a bronze medal in the double scull at the 1991 World Rowing Junior Championships

The highest ranking was achieved by Eveline Peleman, when she became world champion in the women's lightweight single scull in 2014. She also won a bronze medal at the World Rowing U23 Championships in the women's lightweight single scull that same year.

== Ghent May regatta and Belgian International Open regatta ==
The club organises the annual Ghent May Regatta on the Watersportbaan in Ghent.

It should not be confused with the other Ghent-based regattas, such as the annual Spring Regatta in April, organised by the Gentse Roei- en Sportvereniging or the International Regatta KRC Ghent, which is organised in late September by Royal Club Nautique de Gand.

== Henley Royal Regatta ==
The club was one of the first foreign winners of the famous Grand Challenge Cup. The first winning crew was a combination with Royal Club Nautique de Gand and some years later an all-KRSG team managed to win it a second time. The most recent participations were in 1983 and 2008.

== Notable members ==
The current president is Patrick Rombaut. Gwenda Stevens, vice president and youth coach, is also the current president of the Belgian Rowing Federation.

Victor "Fike" Uytterhaegen and Guido Terryn were the club's most successful coaches. Terryn most notably coached Rita Defauw, Wim Van Belleghem and the coxless pair made up of van Belleghem and Alain Lewuillon on an international level, as well as numerous other Belgium national teams.

== Honours ==
=== Henley Royal Regatta ===
Year	Races won
1907	Grand Challenge Cup
