= North Sea Port =

Port system in Belgium and the Netherlands

- Aerial photograph of the Port of Ghent

Location
- Country: Belgium, Netherlands
- Location: Ghent, Terneuzen, Vlissingen

Statistics
- Website; Official website

North Sea Port is a port system consisting of the ports of Ghent, Belgium and Terneuzen and Vlissingen, Netherlands. Terneuzen has had a port authority since 1970 and Vlissingen since 1971. Those port authorities merged in 1998 into Zeeland Seaports, and another merger with the Port of Ghent went into effect on 1 January 2018. It directly provides 28,877 jobs in Belgium (2020) and 21,570 jobs in the Netherlands (2024).

The system includes an ArcelorMittal steel plant.
