= Wim Soetaert =

Wim Soetaert is a chemical and biochemical engineer who heads the Centre of Expertise for Industrial Biotechnology and Biocatalysis (InBio.be) at Ghent University, Faculty of BioScience Engineering. His research group is active in the development of fermentative and biocatalytic production processes.

== Early education and life ==
Soetaert received a PhD in bioengineering from Ghent University. He worked as a research director in Germany and France, for the sugar group Pfeifer & Langen and the wheat processing company Chamtor.

He is the founder and chairman of Flanders Biobased Valley, a public-private partnership to promote the development of biobased activities in the Ghent area. Soetaert is also the director of the Bio Base Europe Pilot Plant, an open innovation pilot plant for biobased products and processes based in Ghent.
