= Geeraard de Duivelsteen =

Gand castle, Belgium

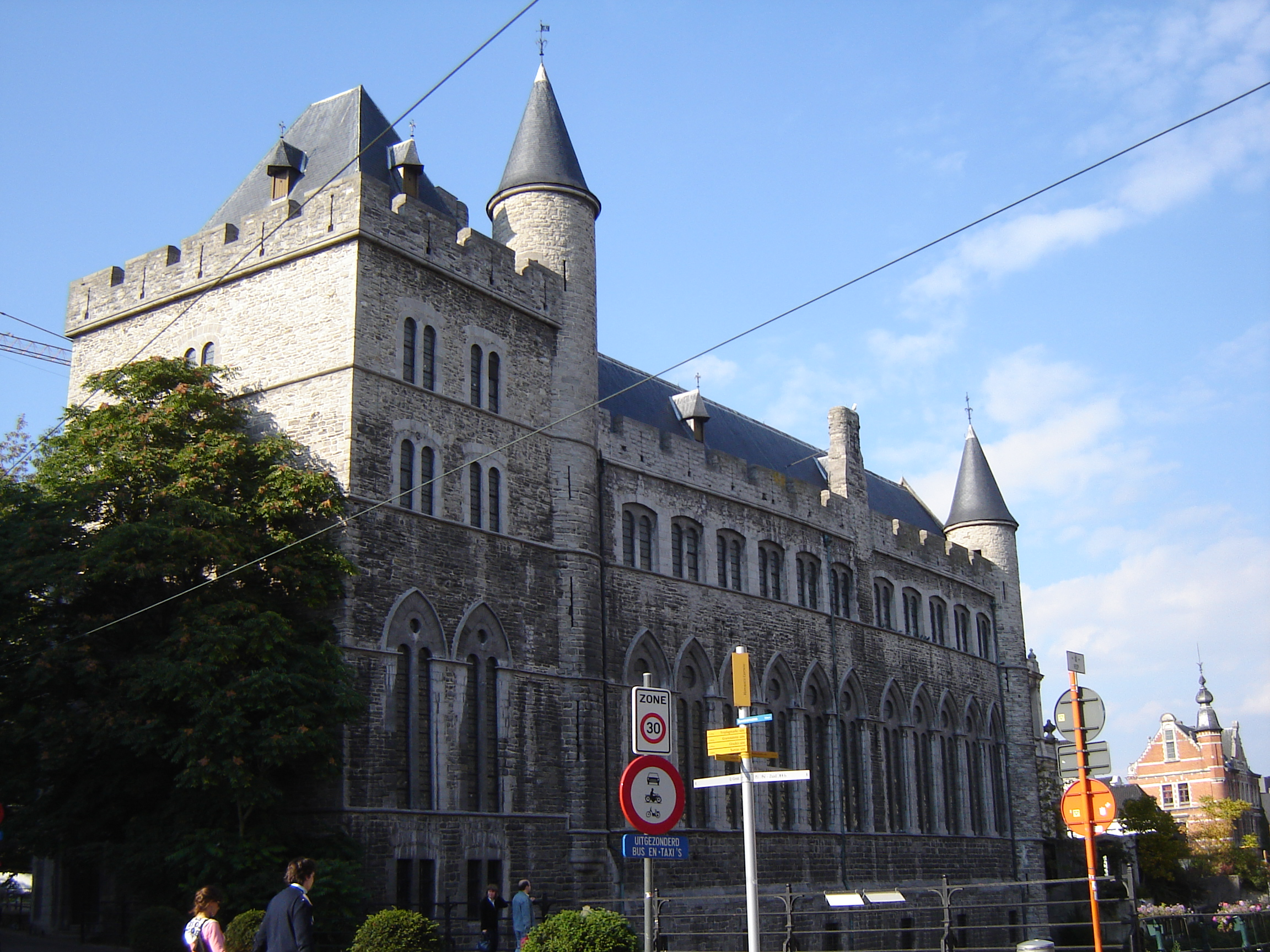
Geeraard de Duivelsteen

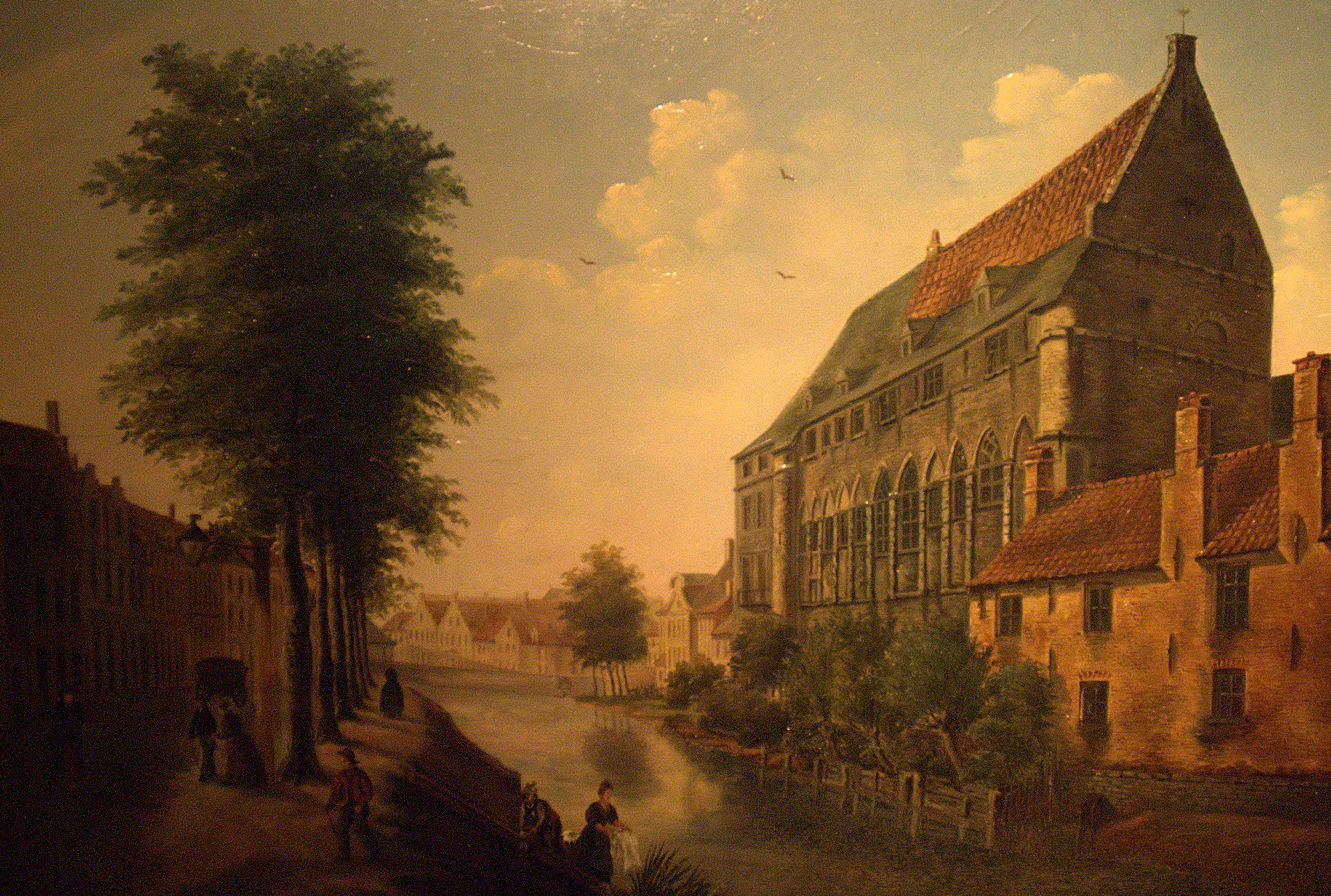
The castle depicted on a 19th-century painting by Joseph Van Haerde.

The Geeraard de Duivelsteen ("Geeraard the Devil Castle") is a 13th-century gothic architecture building in Ghent, Belgium. It served as defense of the Portus Ganda, the city's port.

== History ==
The building was built in the 13th century and was named after the knight Geeraard Vilain (1210-1270), second son of the fifteenth viscount of Ghent, Zeger III of Ghent. Vilain's nickname was "Geeraard de Duivel" ("Geerard the Devil"), which was based on his dark complexion and hair color.

In the 14th century, the building became city property. Over the course of centuries, it was used for various functions; gatherings of knights, as an armory, a monastery, a school, the seminary for the diocese of Ghent, an insane asylum and a prison. In 1775, the Rasphuis near the Coupure channel became the new prison. In 1830, the Geeraard de Duivelsteen became a fire station. Near the end of the 19th century, it was bought by the Belgian state to serve as a national archive. For this purpose, a new wing was built.

Due to the numerous restorations, the building has changed a lot since the Middle Ages. Since 2010, it has been for sale, because of its unsuitability for the storing of archives.

== In popular culture ==
In the Belgian comics series The Adventures of Nero the building is the personal home of Geeraard de Duivel, one of Nero's major antagonists. It is depicted in three stories: "De Hoed van Geeraard de Duivel" ("Geeraard the Devil's hat") (1950), "De Terugkeer van Geeraard de Duivel" ("The Return of Geeraard the Devil") (1983) and "De Kolbak van How" ("The Busby of How") (1993-1994).

It's a central location in Jan Bucquoy's comic book album Gerard de Duivel, written by Bucquoy and drawn by Tito (Tiburcio de la Llave).

It was one of the locations used in the BBC drama series The White Queen.
