= Joseph Guislain =

Belgian physician (1797–1860)

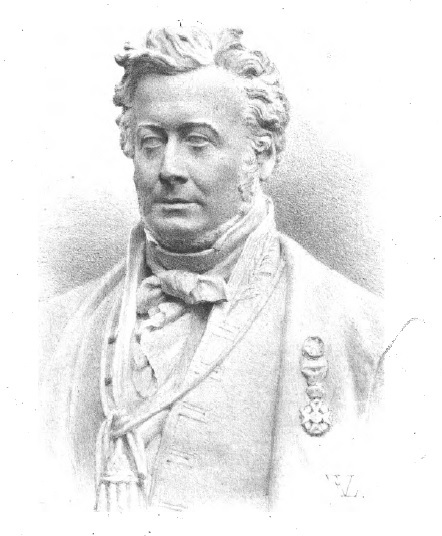
- Dr Joseph Guislain buste
- Born: 2 February 1797; Ghent, Belgium
- Died: 1 April 1860 (aged 63); Ghent, Belgium
- Education: Ecole de Médicine; University of Ghent
- Occupations: Physician; psychiatrist
- Known for: Pioneer in psychiatry

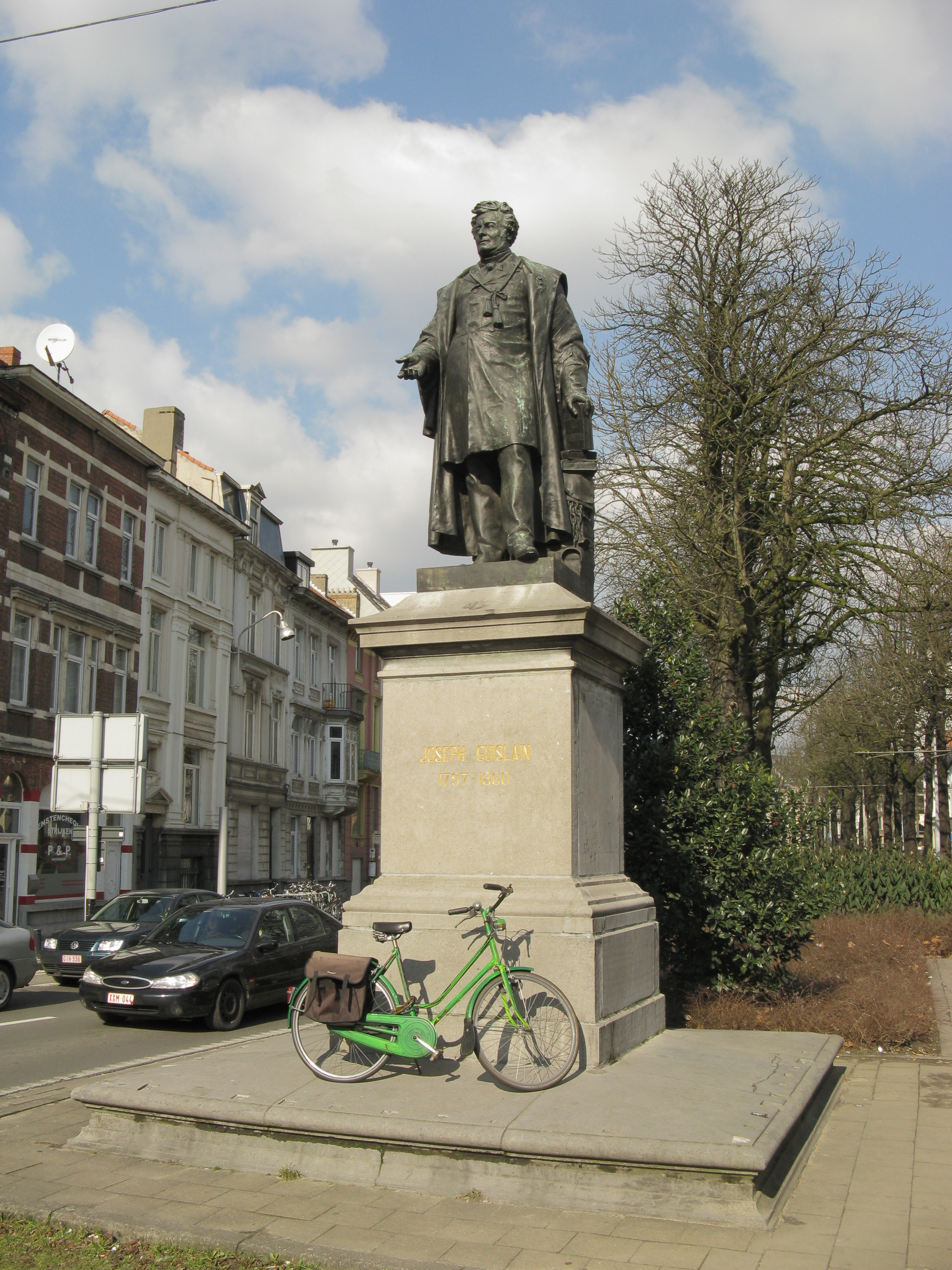
Statue of Dr. Guislain in Ghent (Erected 1887).

Joseph Guislain (Ghent, 2 February 1797 – Ghent, 1 April 1860) was a Belgian medical doctor and a pioneer in psychiatry.

== Education ==
Guislain started his medical studies at Ecole de Médicine and he was one of the first students to the University of Ghent; he graduated as a medical doctor in 1819.

== Career ==
In 1828 Guislain became head of the psychiatric hospitals of Ghent, for which he wrote a new internal regulation together with Petrus Josef Triest. It was the first of its type and stipulated how to handle the patients in a decent and therapeutically justified way. In 1850, together with Edouard Ducpétiaux, he was at the basis of the law on psychiatric care, which would remain the framework for psychiatric care in Belgium until 1991. Joseph Guislain published his Traité sur les phrénopathies in 1833, in which he proposed a new form of psychiatric classification. He argued that although mental illnesses could take many forms they were all derived from the same single disease process. This gave rise to the psychiatric doctrine of unitary psychosis which was highly influential in German psychiatry from the mid-nineteenth century. In his three-volume work Leçons orales sur les phrénopathies of 1852 he further expanded his vision on mental illness.

In 1835, he was appointed as professor in physiology at the University of Ghent. In 1848, he became a member of the governing board of the new moderate Liberal Association, put himself up as a candidate for the municipality Council elections and was elected. Three years later he was re-elected for a second period of three years, but in 1854 he made an end to his political career.

In 1852, the municipality Council of Ghent accepted his plans for a new psychiatric hospital and in 1857 the Guislain Institute was inaugurated. After he died on 1 April 1860 in Ghent he was interred at the Campo Sancto in Sint Amandsberg. In 1887, a statue for him was inaugurated at the Begijnhoflaan in Ghent.

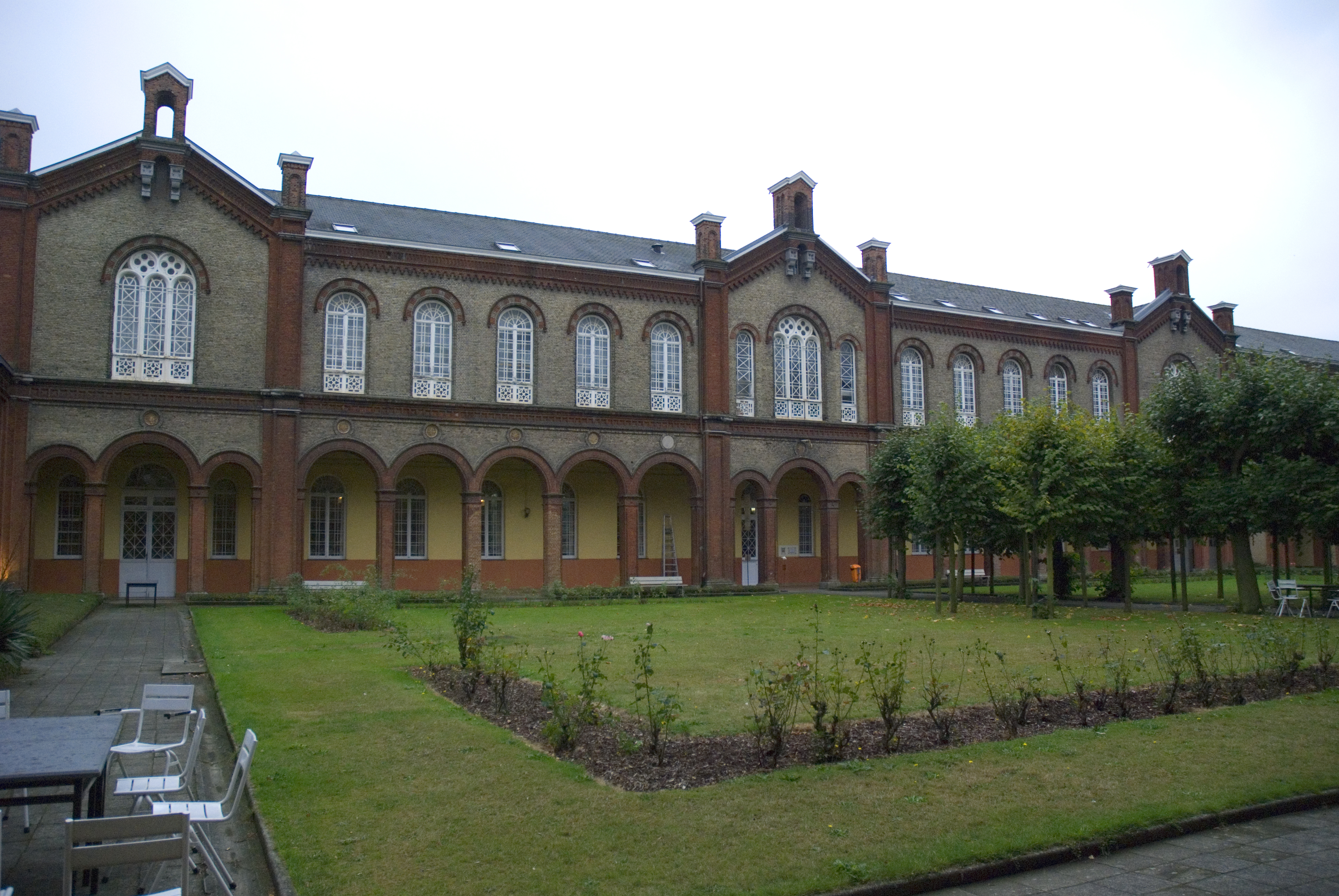
Dr. Guislain museum, former psychiatric hospital, built 1857.

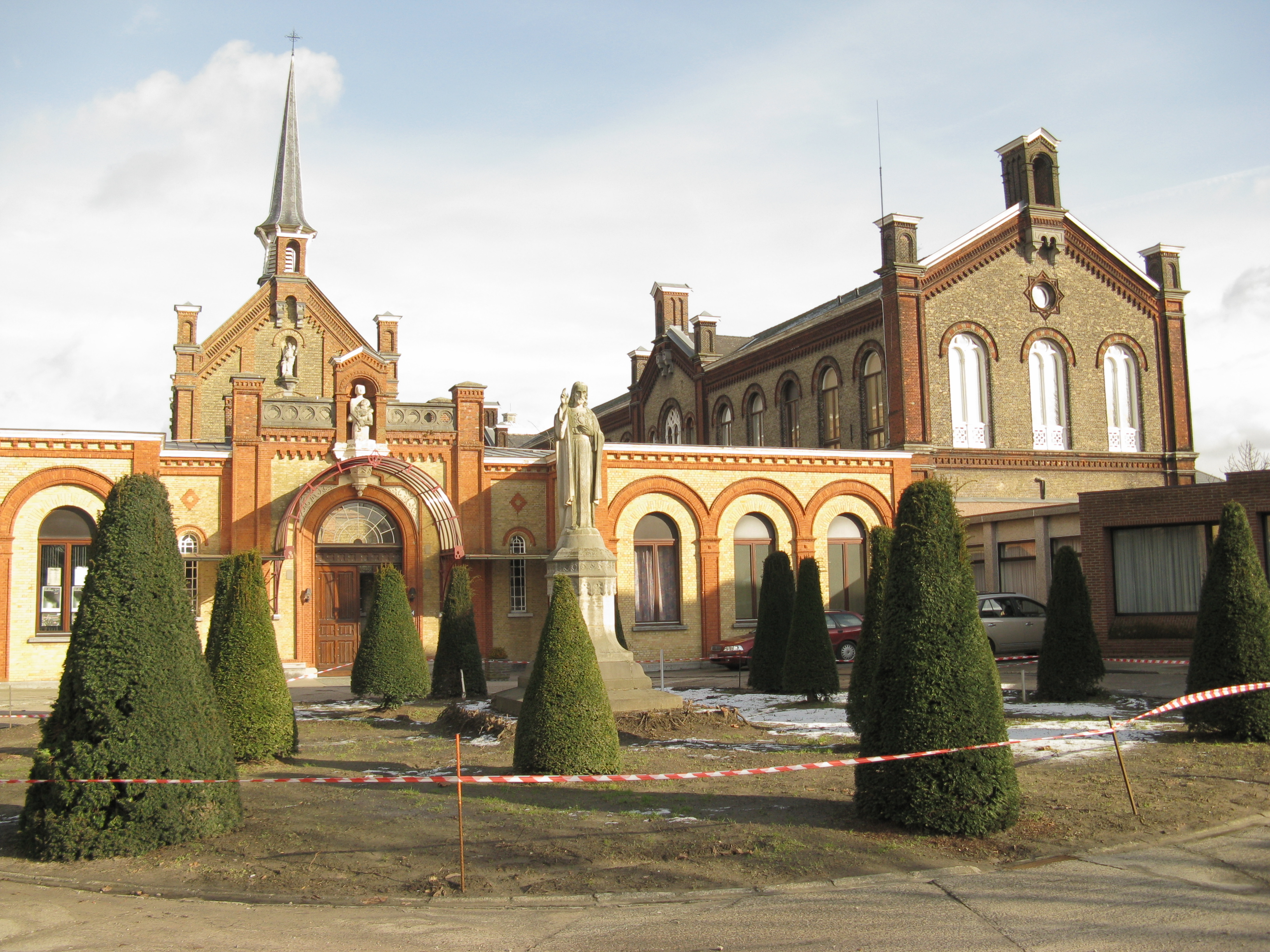
Dr. Guislain psychiatric hospital.

== Sources ==
- Joseph Guislain (Liberal Archive) (link not found)
