= Veterans' Rowers' Association =

Belgian rowing club

- Location: Ghent, Belgium
- Home water: Leie River
- Founded: 1960
- Former names: Association Flemish Veteran rowers
- Affiliations: Ghent Students Rowing
- Website: www.rowing-vvr.be

Veterans' Rowers' Association (Dutch: Vereniging Veteranen Roeiers, VVR) is a Belgian rowing club in the city of Ghent.

In the Dutch language (and more generally in Europe) Veteraan was (and is sometimes still) used for older competition sporters in athletics, rowing and some other sports.

Originally called the Association Flemish Veteran rowers, who were the Flemish wing of the 'Veterans' Scullers and Oarsmen of Belgium' which in turn were founded in 1960 by Brussels students rowing club 'Sport Nautique Universitaire de Bruxelles'.

Since 1990, the International Rowing Federation (Fédération Internationale des Sociétés d'Aviron, FISA) has used the name 'Masters' for older competition rowers from the age of at least 27 years old.

Every year the FISA organises the FISA World Rowing Masters Regatta, the largest participated rowing regatta worldwide. The competition – department of VVR makes teams with the best Masters – rowers of the country, some of which are world champions in their age group.

The club is the first and only autonomous rowing club for Masters in Belgium, and they have their activities at the Vissersdijk, a part of the Leie River that crosses the famous urban Watersportbaan rowing racecourt of Ghent. The location of the May regatta and the Spring Regatta is well known International Open Category Rowing Races in Great Britain and Ireland.

Since 1984, the recreational program of the association is organising the Golden River Toertocht on the Leie River along the famous Flemish luminist and expressionist painters village of Sint-Martens-Latem.

In 2006, the association began to educate students in rowing. VVR is today the main host club and sponsor of Ghent Students Rowing. Two autonomous target group - directed clubs work now together.

== See also ==
- Senior sport
