= Koninklijke Roeivereniging Club Gent =

Rowing club based in Ghent, Belgium

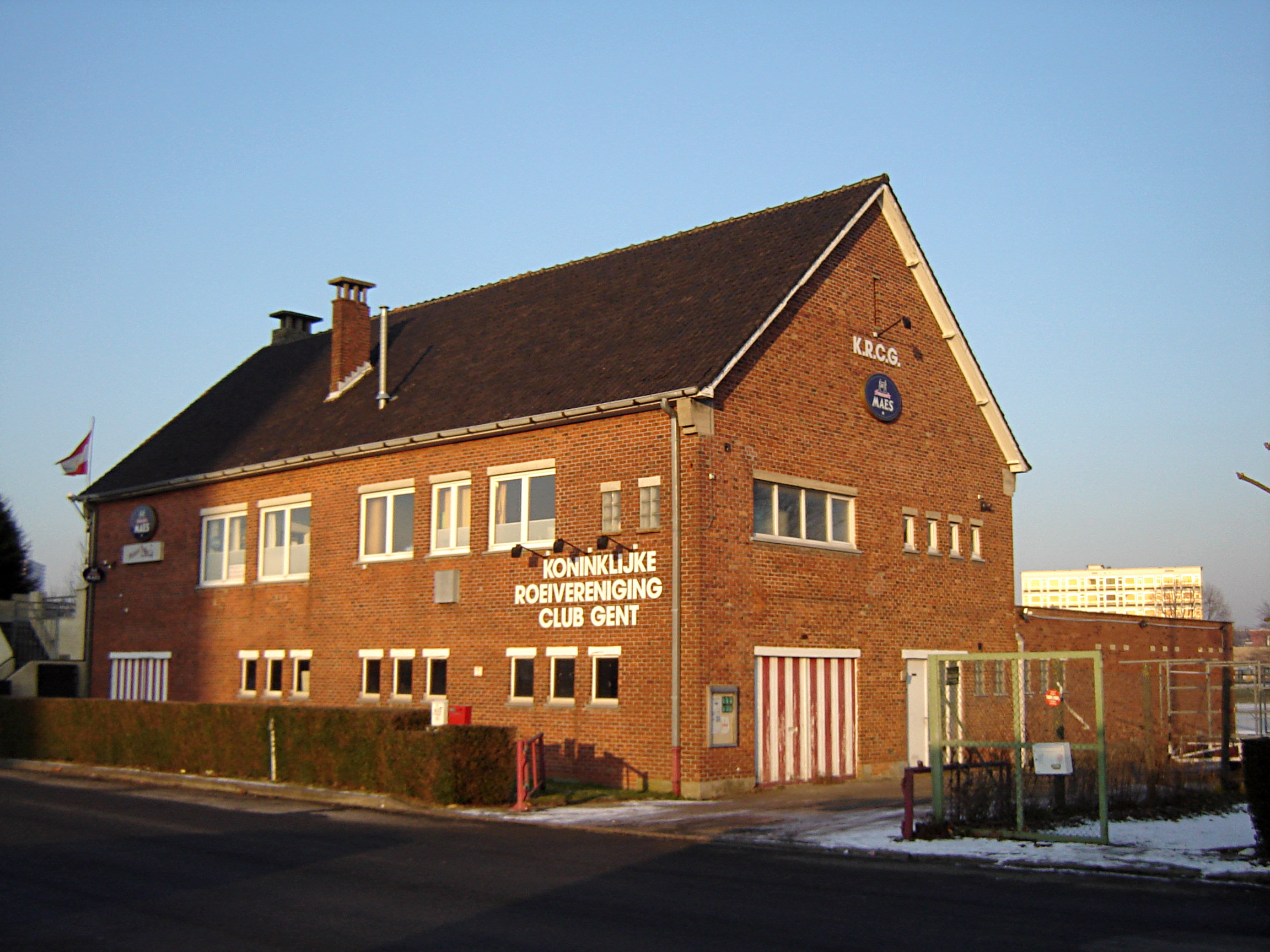
- Location: Watersportbaan, Ghent, Belgium
- Home water: Watersportbaan, Ghent
- Founded: 1871
- Affiliations: Belgium Rowing Federation
- Website: www.krcg.be

Events
- International FISA Regatta – September

Distinctions
- London Olympics 1908 in the Eight, Silver; Thames Challenge Cup, Gold, Henley Regatta 2001

Koninklijke Roeivereniging Club Gent (English: Royal Rowing Club of Ghent / French: Royal Club Nautique de Gand) is a rowing club from the Belgian city of Ghent founded in 1871. The association is located at the Ghent urban Watersportbaan rowing course.

It has an extensive international track record. Originally the association was called Club Nautique de Gand.

== History ==
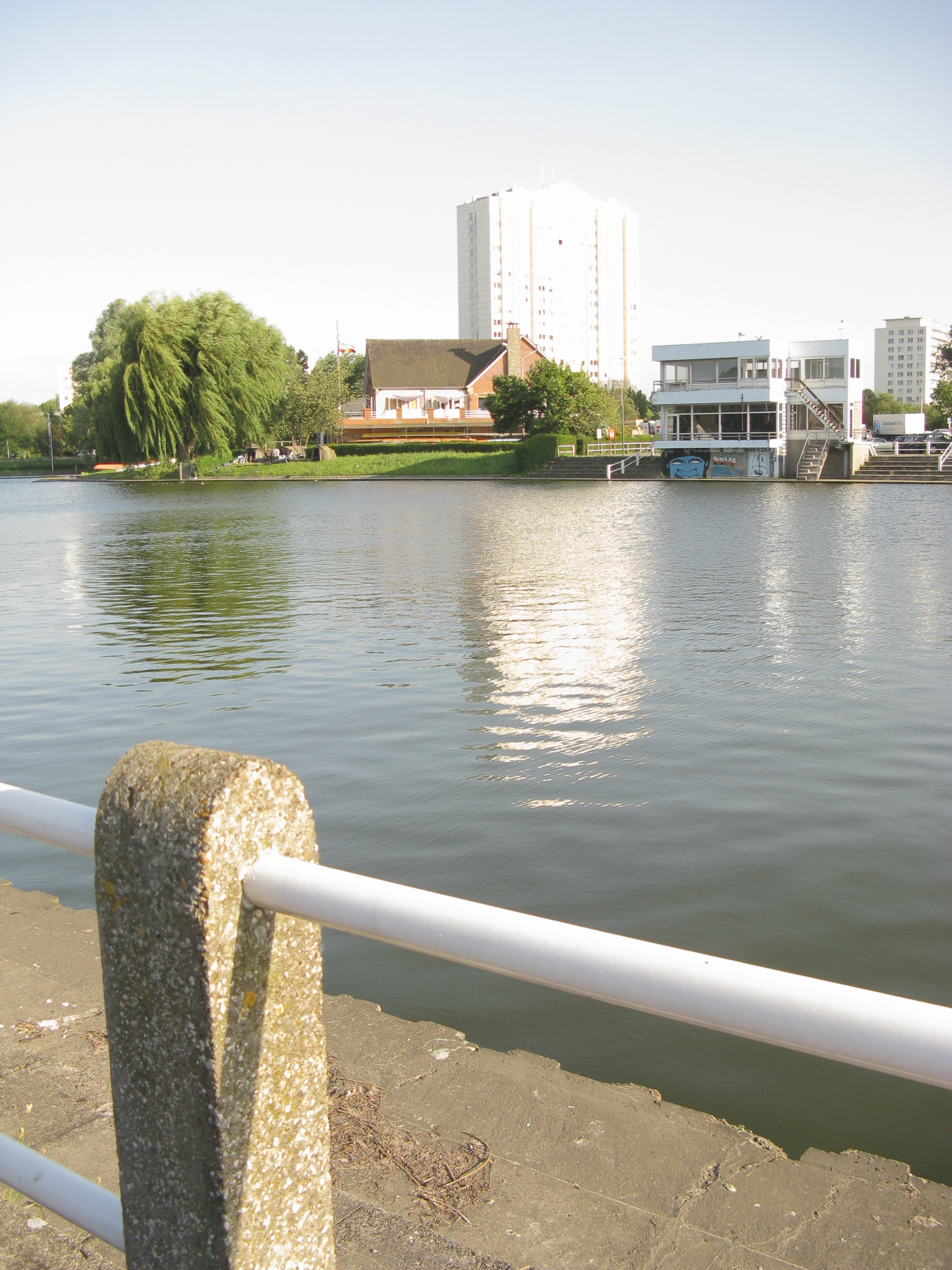
Clubhouse at the finish line of the Watersportbaan

KRCG won (under its old name) a silver medal at the Rowing at the 1900 Summer Olympics and at the Rowing at the 1908 Summer Olympics and where the finalist teams took the world-record in the heavy men's eights and at the Rowing at the 1912 Summer Olympics where the club won in the single sculls.

In a mix with Royal Sport Nautique de Gand and one time in a homogene crew this club was 3 times winner of the Grand Challenge Cup at Henley Royal Regatta. The club won the first ever victory of a foreign club at the Grand in a composite boat with the docks foreman's couple Visser – Molmans of the former Royal Sport Nautique de Gand, during the first years of the 20th century.

In the early 1990s, Club de Gand won the Diamond Challenge Sculls at Henley with the former lightweight world champion Wim Van Belleghem. It was the very first time a lightweight sculler had won this race.

=== International Regatta KRC Ghent ===
Club Ghent and Sport Ghent and their relations were also the co – founders of the three-day international regatta from 1897, the Cluysen - Ter Donck Regatta on the Ghent–Terneuzen Canal. For the first time the leading English rowing clubs were making the trip to the continent. In the United Kingdom it was known as the May - Regatta.

It was much later reinvigorated with new energy by the friends of KR Sport Gent and their Chairman's generation, Rombaut Sr. and Jr. and their team, a few days earlier on the calendar, on the current Watersportbaan.

Until the Second World War and in good weather conditions the Regatta, locally named Bootjesvaring was watched by up to 25'000 visitors.

=== National and more recent success ===
The club won eight consecutive national championships in the open men's eight category at Hazewinkel. This generation was dominating from the mid-nineties up to early 21st century in Belgian heavyweight men's rowing. In this period they were successful on the Heineken Roeivierkamp on the River Amstel in Amsterdam. The crown on that performance was winning at the 2001 Thames Challenge Cup at Henley Royal Regatta.

A Belgian rowing crew who once won the Thames Cup was the Antwerpse Roeivereniging (or Sculling) who are now permanently active in Hazewinkel.

== Honours ==
=== Henley Royal Regatta ===
Year	Races won
1906	Grand Challenge Cup
1909	Grand Challenge Cup
2001	Thames Challenge Cup
