= Ghent–Terneuzen Canal =

Canal in Belgium and the Netherlands

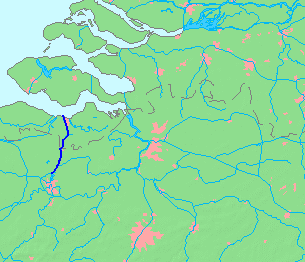
- Map of the canal region
- Interactive map of Ghent–Terneuzen Canal

Specifications
- Length: 32 km
- Maximum boat length: 265 m (869 ft)
- Maximum boat beam: 34 m (112 ft)
- Minimum boat draft: 12.50 m (41.0 ft)

History
- Construction began: 1823
- Date completed: 1827

Geography
- Start point: Ghent, Belgium
- End point: Westerschelde (Scheldt) At Terneuzen, Netherlands

The Ghent–Terneuzen Canal (Dutch: Kanaal van Gent naar Terneuzen), also known as the "Sea Canal" (Zeekanaal) is a canal linking Ghent in Belgium to the port of Terneuzen on the Westerschelde (Scheldt) Estuary in the Netherlands, thereby providing the former with better access to the sea.

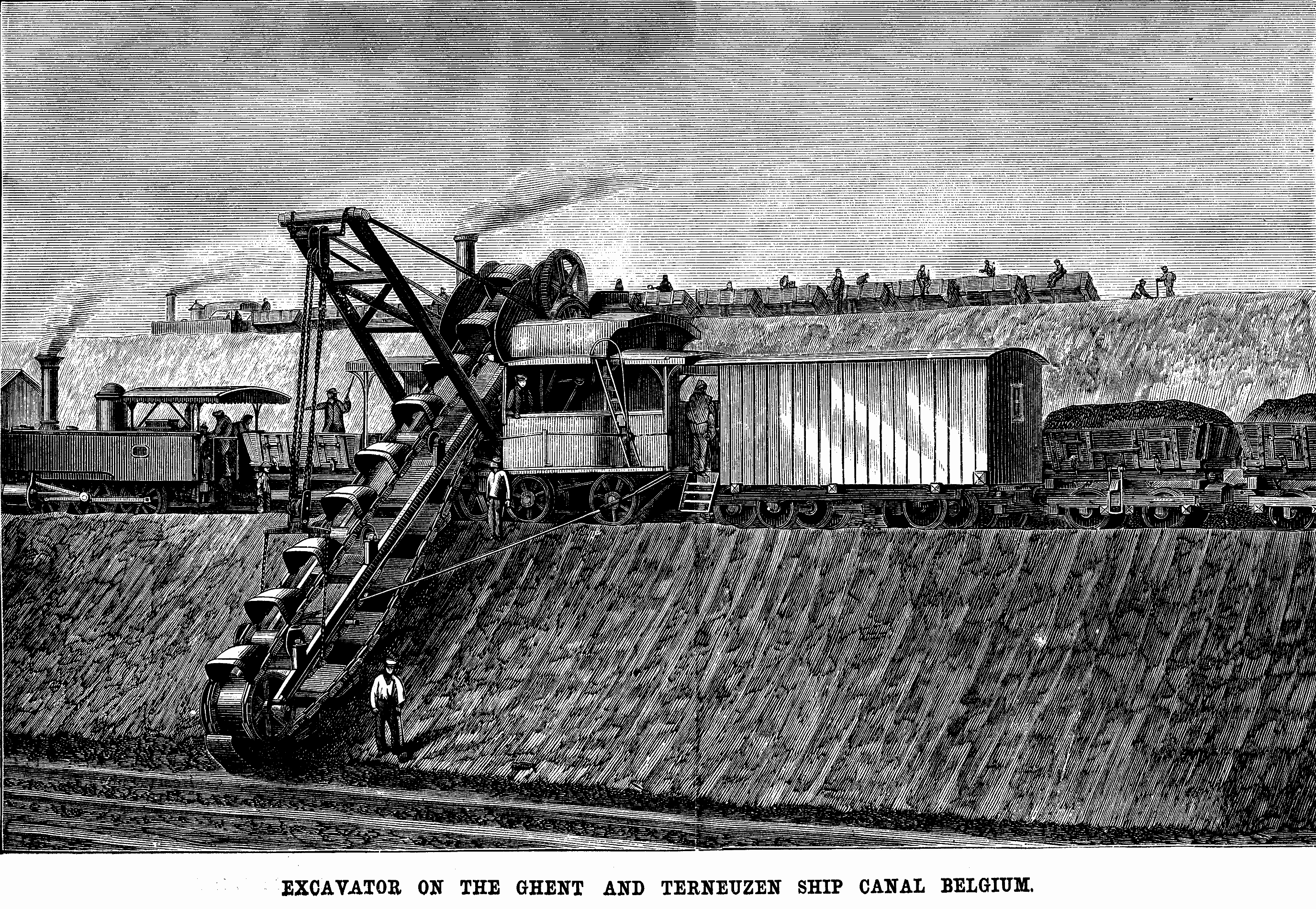
Excavation of the canal in 1878

== History ==
The canal was constructed between 1823 and 1827 on the initiative of the Dutch King: Belgium (as it subsequently became) and the Netherlands had become a united country under the terms agreed at the Congress of Vienna. After Belgium broke away in 1830, traffic to and from Belgium was blocked by the Dutch until 1841.

Between 1870 and 1885, the canal was enlarged to a depth of six and a half metres at its centre, and to a width of 17 metres at its base and 68 metres at the surface level: bridges being rebuilt accordingly along the Belgian sector.

The further improvement of the Ghent–Terneuzen Canal was regulated by the Acts of 22 April 1880 (Netherlands) and 29 April 1880 (Belgium).

On 24 December 1881, tenders were invited for the construction of a lock in the lateral canal east of Sas van Gent, as well as for the widening and deepening of the canal on Dutch territory. Ackermans & van Haaren participated in this tender. In January 1882, Nicolaas van Haaren requested the swift approval of the tender of 24 December 1881, as he was already negotiating with suppliers regarding the required materials. After Charles-Xavier Sainctelette, Belgian Minister of Public Works, had granted authorization on behalf of his government, the works were awarded.

The construction of the lock and the iron swing bridge was assigned to Célestin Poiry and Simon Frères of Antwerp. Nicolaas van Haaren and Hendrikus Theodorus Wiegerinck were awarded the contract for excavating the lateral canal east of Sas van Gent and for widening and deepening the Dutch section of the canal, for a total sum of 406,000 Dutch guilders. The works were to be completed by June 1884 at the latest. Cornelis van Haaren, brother of Nicolaas, and Wannerus Jacobus Wiegerinck personally acted as guarantors for both contractors; their solvency was certified by the mayors of Kerkdriel and Groenlo.

The eastern canal arm east of Sas van Gent, including the new lock, was completed on 1 September 1885. At that time, the canal had a depth of 6.5 metres, a bottom width of 17 metres, and a surface width of 68 metres.

Owing to the steadily increasing size of seagoing vessels and the gradual replacement of sailing ships by substantially larger steamships, it became evident that Ghent would struggle to maintain its competitive position with the existing canal. Consequently, new negotiations were initiated with the Netherlands regarding further modifications to the Ghent–Terneuzen Canal.

On 29 June 1895, Belgium and the Netherlands concluded an agreement providing for the execution of 21 improvement works to the Ghent–Terneuzen Canal, notably in Terneuzen, Sluiskil, and Sas van Gent. Following ratification of this treaty by the Dutch Parliament on 29 January 1897, the works were progressively put out to tender.

The new lock at Terneuzen was tendered at the end of 1900. The contract included, inter alia, the construction of the lock west of Terneuzen, the lock heads east of Sas van Gent, the lock gates and the superstructure of the swing bridge at Sas van Gent, the works at Sluiskil, the superstructures of the bridges (a railway bridge and a road bridge) at Sluiskil, the connecting canal, the harbour dikes, and the swing bridge at Terneuzen.

The tenders of 1901 for the new lock at Terneuzen and those of 1904 for the improvement works to the Ghent–Terneuzen Canal and the superstructures of the bridges at Sluiskil were awarded to two Belgian contractors: Auguste Medaets of Schaerbeek and Hippolyte De Clercq of Uccle. The total contract sum amounted to 2,791,900 Dutch guilders. Hendrik Willem Ackermans (domiciled in Kerkdriel and residing in Antwerp)—who stayed with Jacobus van Haaren in Rosario de Santa Fé, Argentina, from May to the end of July 1904 to supervise hydraulic engineering works—and Nicolaas van Haaren (Nijmegen) each personally acted as guarantors for these contractors. Their solvency was confirmed by the mayor of Driel to the Queen’s Commissioner in Zeeland.

Following the death of Nicolaas van Haaren in August 1904, a new guarantee had to be arranged. C. van der Hooft of Terneuzen was willing to assume this role, but only for part of the works to be executed. For the remaining works, no guarantor could be found in the Netherlands. Unlike Belgium, where a commercial guarantee sufficed, the Netherlands also required a personal guarantee. The chief engineer therefore proposed to the minister that no further guarantors be required for the remaining works.

The works were carried out within the restricted zones of the fortress of Neuzen, for which the authorization of the Minister of War was required. In December 1905, the contractors Medaets and De Clercq applied for compensation for the additional costs and delays incurred as a result of the application of the new law on works carried out under pressures higher than atmospheric pressure, intended to protect caisson workers.

The famous Cluysen - Ter Donck Regatta was organised here for many decades (1888-1954) and during the 1913 Expo of Ghent the European Rowing Championships took place on the canal.

Further development and major enlargement took place during the subsequent century, most notably during the early 1960s.

In February 2015, Flanders and the Netherlands signed a treaty for the construction of a new lock at Terneuzen, scheduled for completion in 2021 and costing €920M. The new lock is about the same size as those of the contemporaneous expansion project of the Panama Canal.

== Today ==
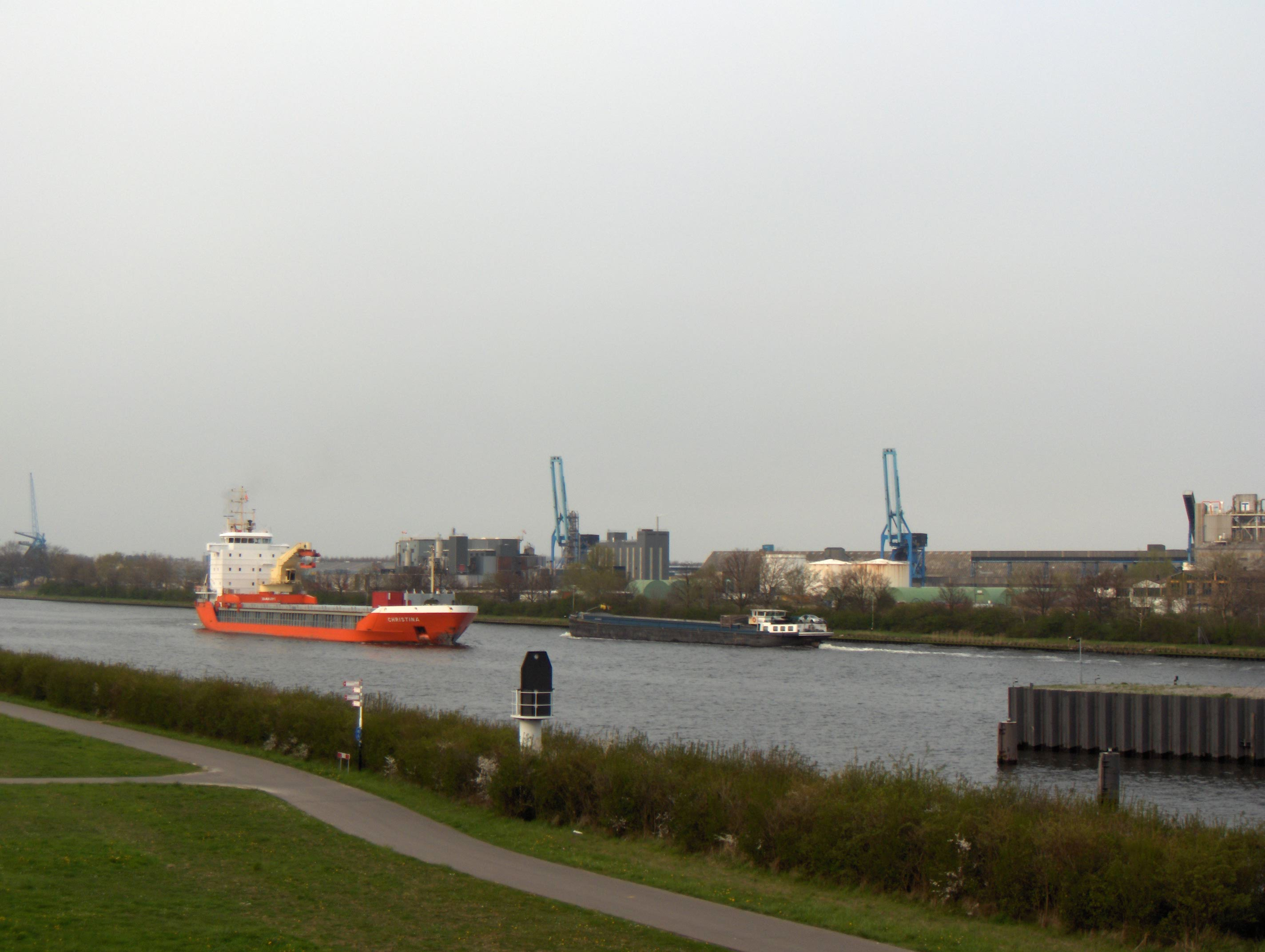
Near the bridge of Sluiskil

Today the Ghent-Terneuzen canal is 200 metres wide and 32 kilometers (20 mi) long, capable of accommodating ships of up to 125 000 gross tonnage. The largest permitted vessel size has increased, correspondingly, to 265 metres long x 34 metres wide, with a draught of up to 12.5 metres.

== See also ==
- North Sea Locks
