= Eveline Peleman =

Belgian rower

Personal information
- Nationality: Belgian
- Born: 1993 (age 32–33) Ghent, Belgium

Sport
- Sport: Rowing
Medal record
Women's rowing
Representing Belgium
World Championships
Gold medal – first place	2014 Bosbaan	Lightweight single scull
World U23 Championships
Bronze medal – third place	2013 Linz-Ottensheim	Lightweight single scull

Eveline Peleman (born 1993) from Ghent, Belgium is an elite rower. She was the 2014 World Champion in the women's lightweight 1x in Amsterdam. After winning the Lightweight women's single scull (LW1x) in Amsterdam. She started rowing back in 2005 at Royal Sport Nautique de Gand. This club was the first foreign Grand Challenge Cup winner and participated several times in the Thames Challenge Cup contest. Eveline also got a bronze medal in the 2014 World Rowing U23 Championships.
