= Port of Ghent =

Port in Belgium

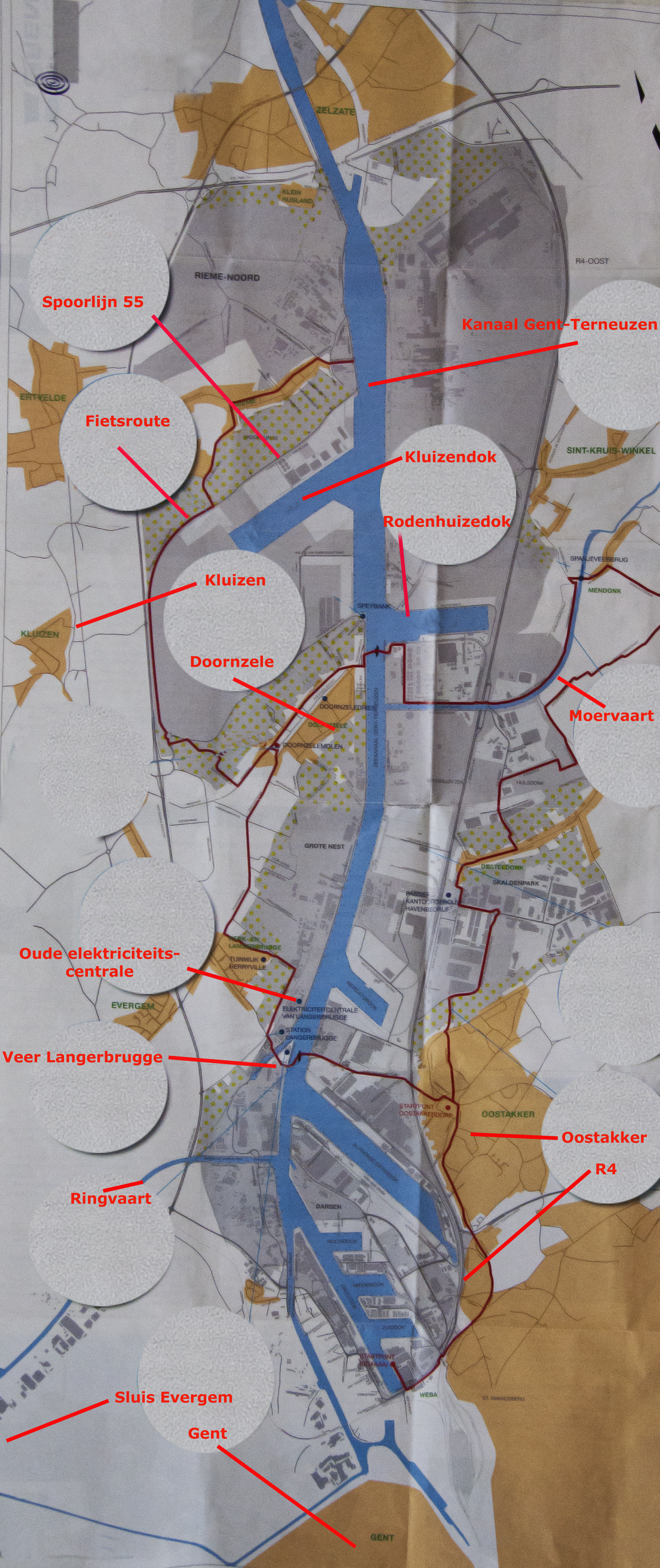
- Port of Ghent lay-out
- Interactive map of Port of Ghent

Location
- Country: Belgium
- Location: Ghent, East Flanders
- Coordinates: 51°06′21″N 3°44′24″E
- UN/LOCODE: BEGNE

Statistics
- Annual cargo tonnage: 47,712 million tonnes (2014)
- Annual container volume: 530.823 TEU (2014)
- Website www.portofghent.be

The Port of Ghent (Dutch: Haven van Gent) is the third busiest seaport in Belgium, located in Ghent, East Flanders in the Flemish Region. The first port of Ghent was situated at the river Scheldt and later on at the Leie. Since the Middle Ages Ghent has sought for a connection to the sea. In the 13th century via the Lieve canal to the Zwin near Damme, in the 16th century via the Sassevaart, in the 17th century via the Ghent–Bruges canal. Since the 19th century, the Ghent–Terneuzen Canal connects the port via the Western Scheldt to the North Sea. The port of Ghent is accessible by ships of the Panamax size, and in February 2015 the construction of a new lock at Terneuzen was announced, which will maintain near-parity with those of the Panama Canal expansion project.

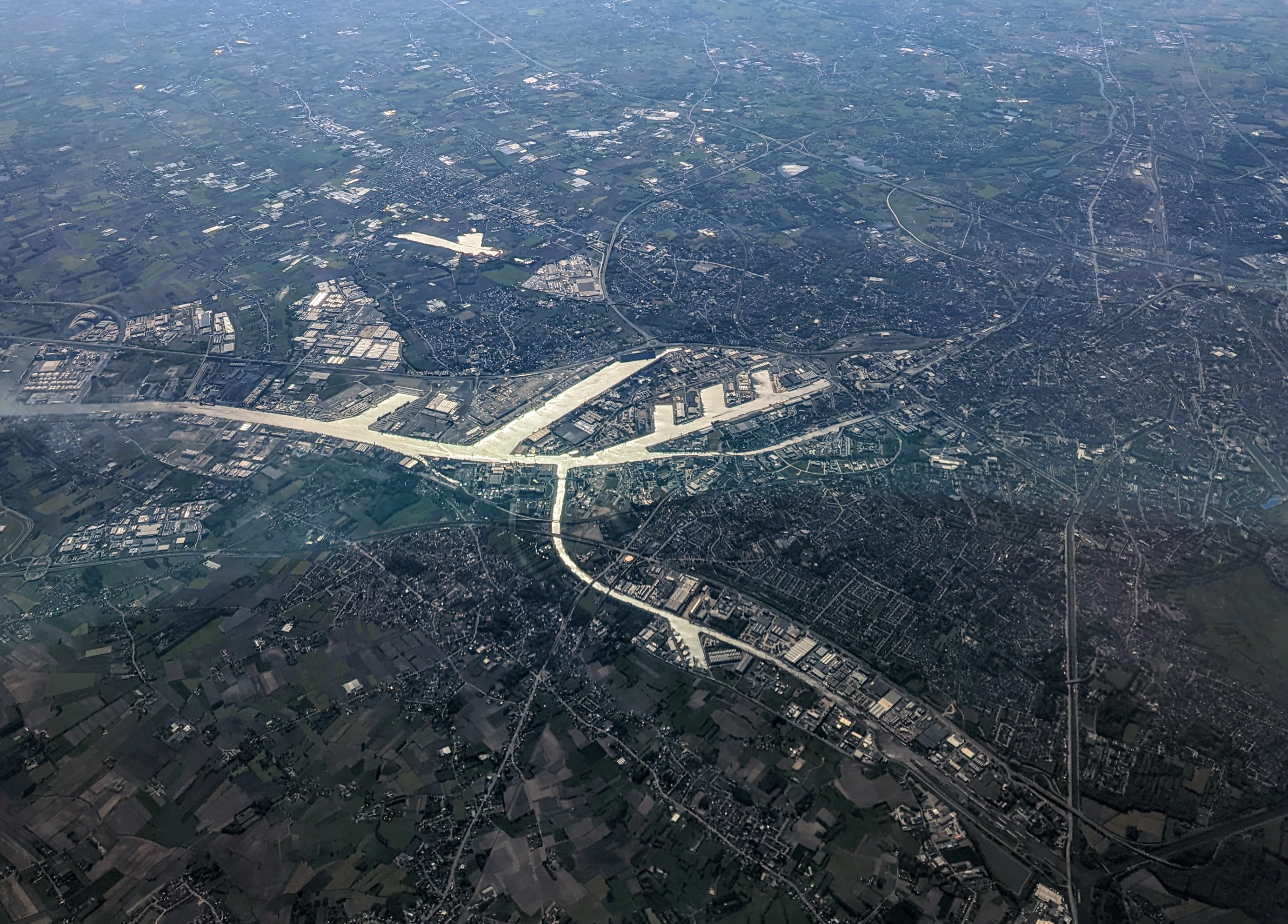
Aerial view of the Port of Ghent from the west

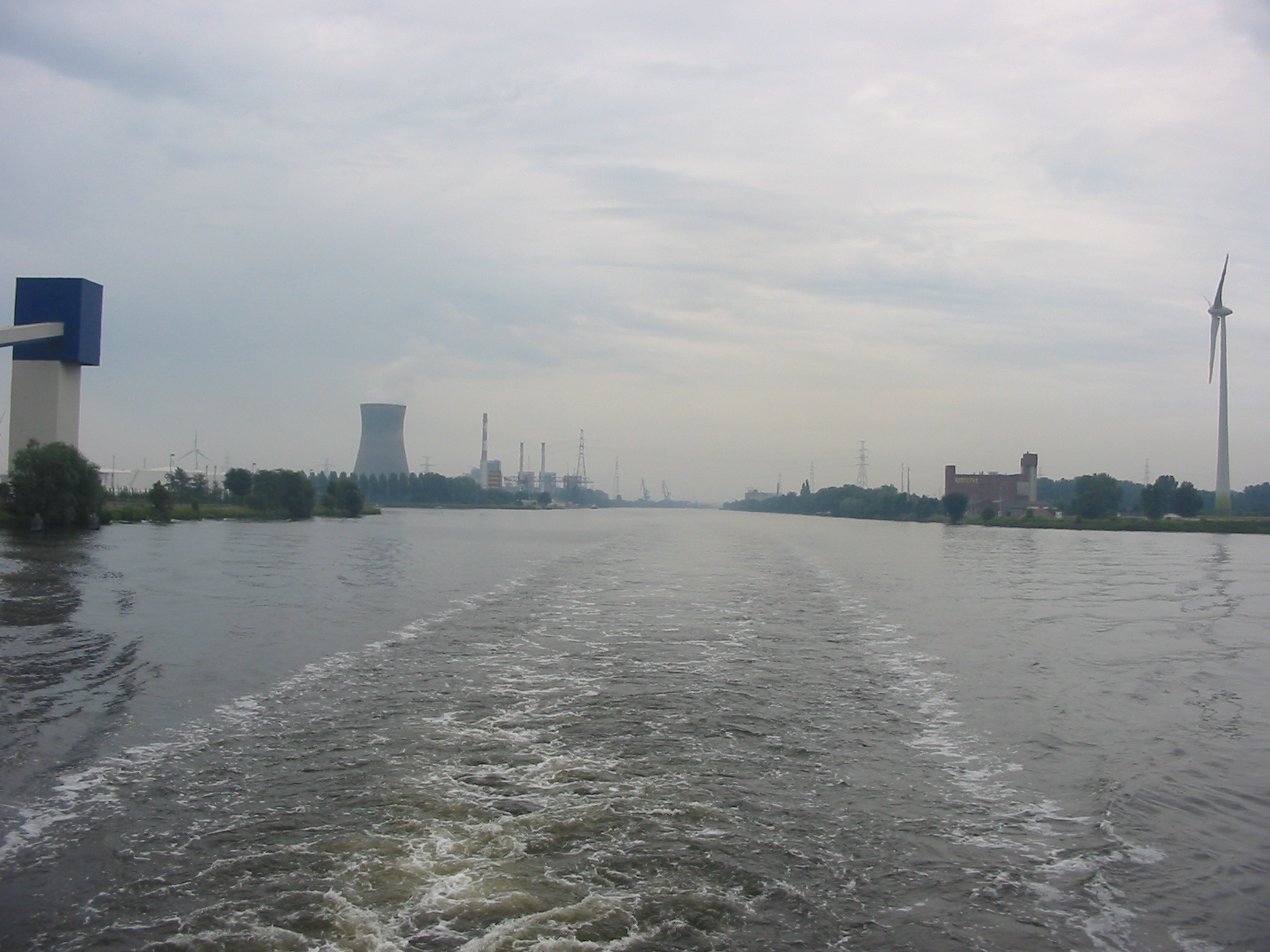
Ghent–Terneuzen Canal, southwards view from a ship near Arcelor Gent

== History ==
In 1251, the Lieve Canal was constructed in order to attempt to connect Ghent to Damme, which was at that time was situated at the Zwin. However, the Zwin sanded up and the Lieve canal lost all relevance by the end of the fifteenth century. In 1547, a second attempt was made by digging the Sassevaart (Sasse Canal), which became a busy trade route. In the sixteenth century however, the European wars of religion meant the end of navigation on the Sassevaart. This due to a traffic lock on both Western Scheldt and all other connecting waterways set by the Dutch. In the 17th century, a new attempt was made with the Ghent–Bruges–Ostend canal. But as a consequence of the abolition of the former trade privileges there was but little activity. The present canal (the Ghent–Terneuzen Canal) was finally dug under the rule of William I, King of the Netherlands. In 1822 the final plan was ratified and in 1827 the works could be started. As waterborne traffic and port activities increased, the sea canal was extended several times:

- 1880–1881: digging of the Voorhaven and Houtdok
- 1900–1930: digging of the Grootdok with the Noord-, Midden- and Zuiddok
- 1931: digging of the Schepen Sifferdok

The works on the Sifferdok were complicated by the crisis of the thirties and by World Wars I and II. A revival was practically impossible as the dimensions of the lock were insufficient for the modern post-war seagoing vessels. In 1960 an agreement was signed between Belgium and the Netherlands, which stipulated that a new sealock was to be built and that the canal was to be adapted for vessels up to 80,000 tonnes deadweight (DWT). now one post-panamax vessel has already managed to pass through the existing lock.her name was alam permai with a deadweight of 87000 tonnes

- 1961–1968: lengthening of the Sifferdok
- 1966–1968: digging of the Petroleumdok
- 1968: inauguration of the new sealock
- 1970–1971/1975–1978: digging of the Rodenhuizedok
- 1996–today: digging of the Kluizendok

With the digging of the newest dock, the Kluizendok, a new era dawned for Ghent. The first phase of the works was scheduled for completion in the autumn of 1999. From that moment onwards the first 1,200m of quay wall and waterfront sites behind became available. In 2005 it the Kluizendok became partially operational. It includes 100 hectares directly fronting the dockside, suitable for logistics and industrial developments, and a further 100 hectares suitable for manufacturing and assembly industries without a direct interface to maritime transport.

In February 2015, Flanders and the Netherlands signed a treaty for the construction of a new lock at Terneuzen, scheduled for completion in 2021 and costing €920M. The new lock is about the same size as those of the contemporaneous expansion project of the Panama Canal. In 2025, the MV Astoria and the MV Solong arrived at the port of Ghent for scrapping.

== See also ==
- Ghent Bio-Energy Valley
- North Sea Port
