= Watersportbaan =

Rowing race course in Ghent, Belgium

Coordinates: 51°02′57″N 3°41′31″E

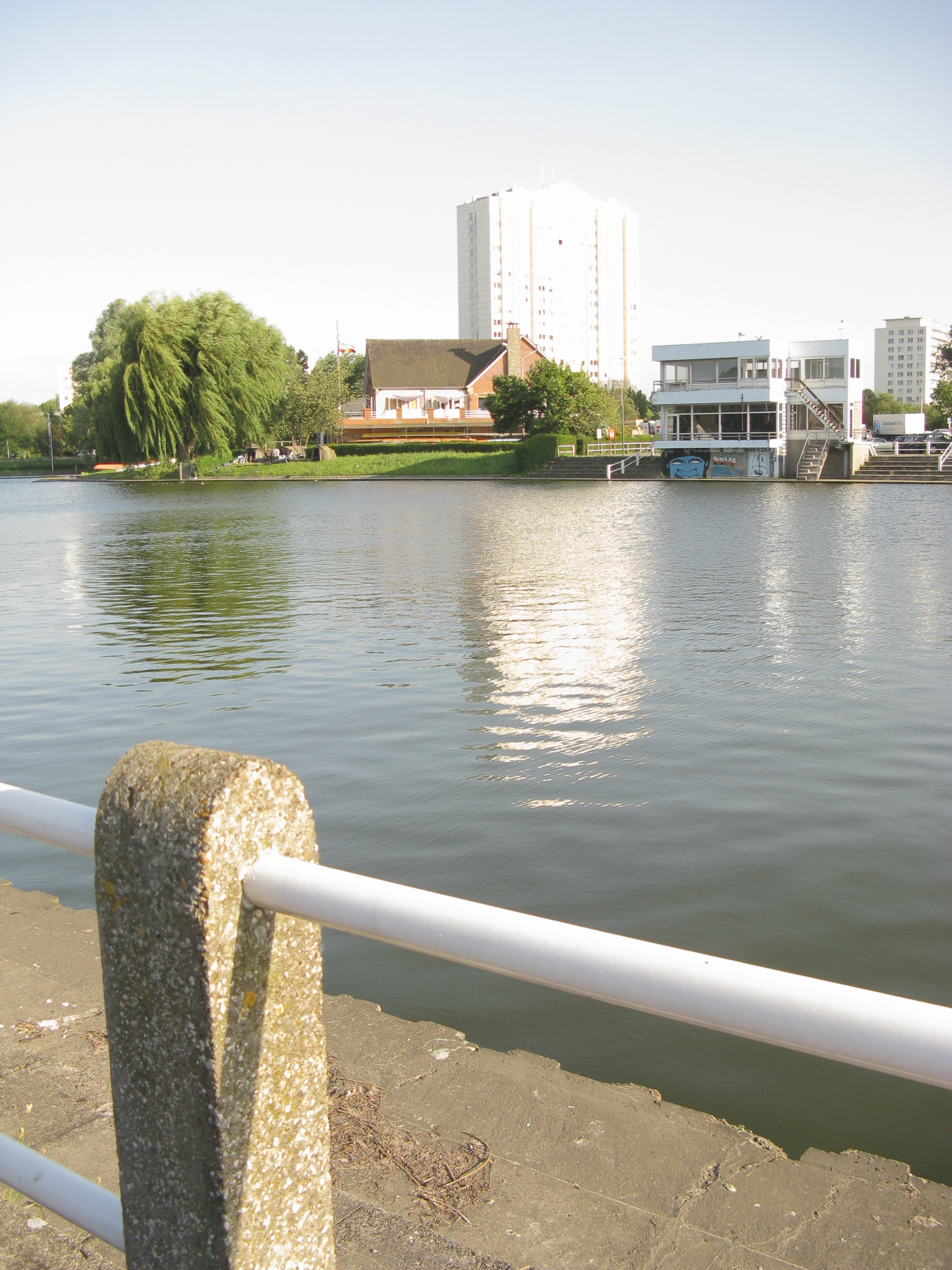
Watersportbaan, finish tower, clubhouse Royal Club Nautique de Gand

The Watersportbaan, official name: Nationale Watersportbaan Georges Nachez, is a five lane rowing race course in the Belgian city of Ghent. It is 2300 metres long and 76m wide and was first used in 1954. Despite most major international Fédération Internationale des Sociétés d'Aviron (FISA) regattas are designed to adhere to the 8-lane Albano format, this race track is suited for 2 medium-sized international FISA Regattas, but also for smaller competitions. The two important annual regattas are Ghent May Regatta organised by Royal Sport Nautique de Gand and the Spring Regatta in April.

Matches on both sides may be close and seats are available only on the full last 250 m stretch. This urban facility near the city center has a direct connection with the numerous adjoining rivers and canals such as the Coupure (Gent) the Graslei, the Ghent-Bruges Canal and the Lys (river), of which a side arm also flows through the rowing course. This makes them more attractive to students and recreational boating.

The Watersportbaan was a project in the old Ghent Neermeersen after the Second World War. The part to the 1500 line was already part of the Leie River. What is now the current finish line was a rubbish dump. The project consisted of social housing, a small shopping center, schools and a central element Watersportbaan. The original name, 'Georges Nachez' refers to the deputy and club chairman from that time. The excavated soil was used as landfill to stabilize the marshy Meersen.

The project was created for the 1955 European Rowing Championships in Ghent. It is today a haven for various athletes. Water sports such as rowing and kanopolo are practiced on the river by both Civil clubs such as Royal Sport Nautique de Gand and Royal Club Nautique de Gand, the multiple and first foreign Grand Challenge Cup and also Thames Challenge Cup 1983 and 2008 finalists and 2001 - winners.

A Finnish track of 5000 metres was constructed around the course that is often used by joggers. The area includes a recreation area and the International Indoor Flanders Sports Arena.
