= Portus Ganda =

Coordinates: 51°03′16″N 3°44′02″E

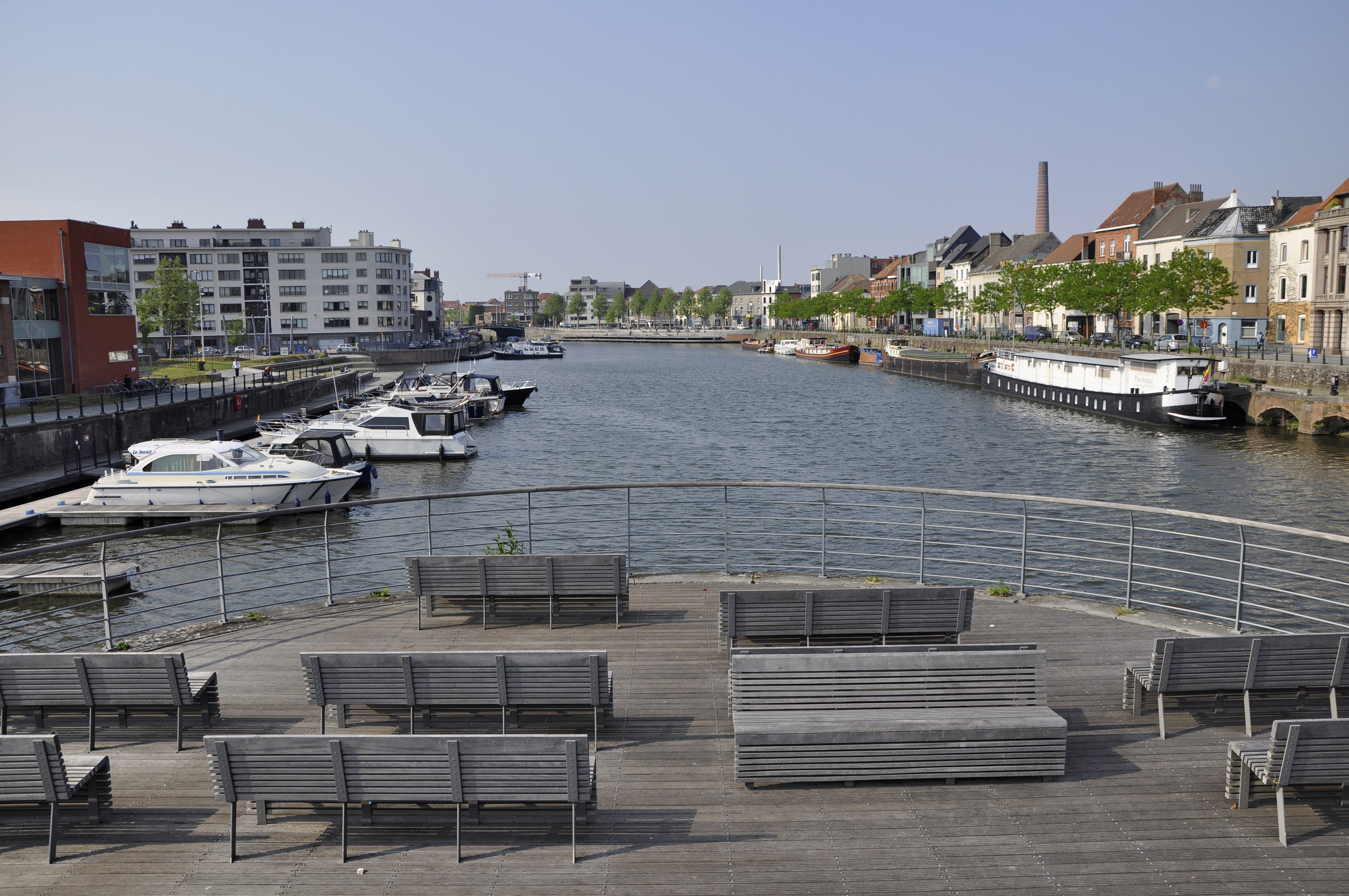
View of Portus Ganda from the Slachthuisbrug

Portus Ganda is one of the yacht moorings provided by the city of Ghent in East Flanders, Belgium. Located at Veerkaai 2 at a crossing in the old waterways of the river Leie, it opened in 2005 to create a destination for people touring the Flemish waterways by boat. The harbour master's office is located next to the new entrance of the Van Eyck swimming pool that faces the Veermanplein. (The pool's original entrance on the Julius de Vingeplein is now a staff-only entrance)

The moorings provide hookups for water and electricity. Security is low as the docks are accessible from the shore.

For people wishing to explore Gent the city centre is in walking distance from the docks and for more immediate needs there are restaurants and shopping along the Kaiser Karel Straat.

The city website provides both Contact Information for the Harbour Master (in Flemish) and tourism information (in English)
