= List of 1900 Summer Olympics medal winners =

The 1900 Summer Olympics, officially the Games of the II Olympiad, were an international multi-sport event which was held in 1900 in Paris, France. Gold medals were not given at the 1900 Games. A silver medal was given for a first place and a bronze medal was given for second. The International Olympic Committee has retroactively assigned gold, silver, and bronze medals to competitors who earned 1st, 2nd, and 3rd-place finishes respectively in order to bring early Olympics in line with current awards.

== Archery ==
| Event | Gold | Silver | Bronze |
| Au Cordon Doré; 50 metres | Henri Hérouin; France | Hubert Van Innis; Belgium | Émile Fisseux; France |
| Au Cordon Doré; 33 metres | Hubert Van Innis; Belgium | Victor Thibault; France | Charles Frédéric Petit; France |
| Au Chapelet; 50 metres | Eugène Mougin; France | Henri Helle; France | Émile Mercier; France |
| Au Chapelet; 33 metres | Hubert Van Innis; Belgium | Victor Thibault; France | Charles Frédéric Petit; France |
| Championnat du Monde | Henri Hérouin; France | Hubert Van Innis; Belgium | Not awarded |
| Sur la Perche à la Herse | Emmanuel Foulon; Belgium | Auguste Serrurier; France Émile Druart; Belgium | Not awarded |
| Sur la Perche à la Pyramide | Émile Grumiaux; France | Auguste Serrurier; France | Louis Glineur; Belgium |

== Athletics ==
| Event | Gold | Silver | Bronze |
|---|---|---|---|
| 60 metres | Alvin Kraenzlein 7.0 s United States | Walter Tewksbury 7.1 s United States | Stan Rowley 7.2 s Australia |
| 100 metres | Frank Jarvis 11.0 s United States | Walter Tewksbury 11.1 s United States | Stan Rowley 11.2 s Australia |
| 200 metres | Walter Tewksbury 22.2 s United States | Norman Pritchard 22.8 s India | Stan Rowley 22.9 s Australia |
| 400 metres | Maxie Long 49.4 s United States | William Holland 49.6 s United States | Ernst Schultz 51.5 s Denmark |
| 800 metres | Alfred Tysoe 2:01.2; Great Britain | John Cregan 2:03.0; United States | David Hall 2:03.8; United States |
| 1500 metres | Charles Bennett 4:06.2; Great Britain | Henri Deloge 4:06.6; France | John Bray 4:07.2; United States |
| Marathon | Michel Théato 2:59:45; France (Note: As Luxembourgish Michel Théato (LUX) represented an French club, his participation and medals are attributed to France. (Note: In 2024, the International Olympic Committee (IOC) reinstated its original and current attribution policy for athletes at the early Olympic Games (1896–1904). Participation and medals have been attributed according to the national affiliation of the club or team represented by the athlete, rather than their nationality.)) | Émile Champion 3:04:17; France | Ernst Fast 3:37:14; Sweden |
| 110 metres hurdles | Alvin Kraenzlein 15.4 s United States | John McLean 15.5 s United States | Frederick Moloney 15.6 s United States |
| 200 metres hurdles | Alvin Kraenzlein 25.4 s United States | Norman Pritchard 26.0 s India | Walter Tewksbury 26.1 s United States |
| 400 metres hurdles | Walter Tewksbury 57.6 s United States | Henri Tauzin 58.3 s France | George Orton 58.8 s United States (Note: As Canadian George Orton (CAN) represented an American institution, the University of Pennsylvania, his participation and medals are attributed to the United States.) |
| 2500 metres steeplechase | George Orton 7:34.4; United States | Sidney Robinson 7:38.0; Great Britain | Jacques Chastanié Unknown; France |
| 4000 metres steeplechase | John Rimmer 12:58.4; Great Britain | Charles Bennett 12:58.6; Great Britain | Sidney Robinson 12:58.8; Great Britain |
| 5000 metres team race | Great Britain Charles Bennett; John Rimmer; Sidney Robinson; Alfred Tysoe; Stan Rowley (AUS) | France Henri Deloge; Jacques Chastanié; Paul Castanet; Michel Champoudry; Gaston Ragueneau | none awarded |
| Long jump | Alvin Kraenzlein 7.185 m United States | Myer Prinstein 7.175 m United States | Patrick Leahy 6.950 m Great Britain |
| Triple jump | Myer Prinstein 14.47 m United States | James Connolly 13.97 m United States | Lewis Sheldon 13.64 m United States |
| High jump | Irving Baxter 1.90 m United States | Patrick Leahy 1.78 m Great Britain | Lajos Gönczy 1.75 m Hungary |
| Pole vault | Irving Baxter 3.30 m United States | Meredith Colket 3.25 m United States | Carl Albert Andersen 3.20 m Norway |
| Standing long jump | Ray Ewry 3.20 m United States | Irving Baxter 3.135 m United States | Émile Torchebœuf 3.03 m France |
| Standing triple jump | Ray Ewry 10.58 m United States | Irving Baxter 9.95 m United States | Robert Garrett 9.50 m United States |
| Standing high jump | Ray Ewry 1.655 m United States | Irving Baxter 1.525 m United States | Lewis Sheldon 1.500 m United States |
| Shot put | Richard Sheldon 14.10 m United States | Josiah McCracken 12.85 m United States | Robert Garrett 12.37 m United States |
| Discus throw | Rudolf Bauer 36.04 m Hungary | František Janda-Suk 35.04 m Bohemia | Richard Sheldon 34.50 m United States |
| Hammer throw | John Flanagan 51.01 m United States | Truxtun Hare 46.26 m United States | Josiah McCracken 43.58 m United States |

== Basque pelota ==
| Gold | Silver |
|---|---|
| Spain José de Amézola y Aspizúa; Francisco Villota | none awarded |

== Cricket ==
| Gold | Silver |
|---|---|
| Devon and Somerset Wanderers; Great Britain C. B. K. Beachcroft (captain); Arthur Birkett; Alfred Bowerman; George Buckley; Francis Burchell; Frederick Christian; Harry Corner; Frederick Cuming; William Donne; Alfred Powlesland; John Symes; Montagu Toller | French Athletic Club Union; France William Anderson (GBR); William Attrill (FRA); John Braid (GBR); W. Browning (GBR); Robert Horne (GBR); Timothée Jordan (GBR); Arthur MacEvoy (GBR); Douglas Robinson (GBR); H. F. Roques (FRA); Alfred Schneidau (GBR); Henry Terry (GBR); Philip Tomalin (captain) (FRA) |

== Croquet ==
| Event | Gold | Silver | Bronze |
|---|---|---|---|
| Singles, one ball | Gaston Aumoitte; France | Georges Johin; France | Chrétien Waydelich; France |
| Singles, two balls | Chrétien Waydelich; France | Maurice Vignerot; France | Jacques Sautereau; France |
| Doubles | France; Gaston Aumoitte; Georges Johin | None | None |

== Cycling ==
| Event | Gold | Silver | Bronze |
|---|---|---|---|
| Men's sprint | Georges Taillandier; France | Fernand Sanz; France | John Henry Lake; United States |
| Men's 25 km | Louis Bastien; France | Lloyd Hildebrand; France (Note: As British Lloyd Hildebrand (GBR) represented a French club, his participation and medals are attributed to France.) | Auguste Daumain; France |
| Men's points race | Enrico Brusoni; Italy | Karl Duill; Germany | Louis Trousselier; France |

== Equestrian ==
| Event | Gold | Silver | Bronze |
|---|---|---|---|
| Jumping | Aimé Haegeman; Belgium | Georges Van Der Poele; Belgium | Louis de Champsavin; France |
| High jump | Dominique Gardères; France Gian Giorgio Trissino; Italy | none awarded | Georges Van Der Poele; Belgium |
| Long jump | Constant van Langhendonck; Belgium | Gian Giorgio Trissino; Italy | Jacques de Prunelé; France |
| Hacks and hunter | Napoléon Murat; France | Victor Archenoul; France | Robert de Montesquiou-Fézensac; France |
| Mail coach | Georges Nagelmackers; Belgium | Léon Thome; France | Jean de Neuflize; France |

== Fencing ==
| Event | Gold | Silver | Bronze |
|---|---|---|---|
| Épée | Ramón Fonst; Cuba | Louis Perrée; France | Léon Sée; France |
| Masters épée | Albert Robert Ayat; France | Émile Bougnol; France | Henri Laurent; France |
| Amateurs-masters épée | Albert Robert Ayat; France | Ramón Fonst; Cuba | Léon Sée; France |
| Foil | Émile Coste; France | Henri Masson; France | Marcel Boulenger; France |
| Masters foil | Lucien Mérignac; France | Alphonse Kirchhoffer; France | Jean-Baptiste Mimiague; France |
| Sabre | Georges de la Falaise; France | Léon Thiébaut; France | Siegfried Flesch; Austria |
| Masters sabre | Antonio Conte; Italy | Italo Santelli; Italy | Milan Neralić; Austria |

== Football ==
| Gold | Silver | Bronze |
|---|---|---|
| Great Britain (Note: Represented by Upton Park F.C.); James Jones; Claude Buckenham; William Gosling; Alfred Chalk; T. E. Burridge; William Quash; Richard Turner; F. G. Spackman; John Nicholas; Jack Zealley; Henry Haslam | France (Note: Represented by Club Française); Pierre Allemane; Louis Bach; Alfred Bloch; Fernand Canelle; Duparc; Eugène Fraysse; Virgile Gaillard; Georges Garnier; René Grandjean; Lucien Huteau; Marcel Lambert; Maurice Macaine; Gaston Peltier | Belgium (Note: Represented by Université de Bruxelles); Marius Delbecque; Hendrik van Heuckelum (NED); Raul Kelecom; Marcel Leboutte; Lucien Londot; Ernest Moreau de Melen; Edmond Neefs; Gustave Pelgrims; Alphonse Renier; Hilaire Spanoghe; Eric Thornton (GBR) |

== Golf ==
| Event | Gold | Silver | Bronze |
|---|---|---|---|
| Men's | Charles Sands; United States | Walter Rutherford; Great Britain | David Robertson; Great Britain |
| Women's | Margaret Abbott; United States | Pauline Whittier; Switzerland (Note: As American Pauline Whittier (USA) represented a Swiss club, her participation and medals are attributed to Switzerland.) | Daria Pratt; France (Note: As American Daria Pratt (USA) represented a French club, her participation and medals are attributed to France.) |

== Gymnastics ==
| Event | Gold | Silver | Bronze |
|---|---|---|---|
| All around | Gustave Sandras; France | Noël Bas; France | Lucien Démanet; France |

== Polo ==
| Gold | Silver | Bronze | Bronze |
|---|---|---|---|
| Great Britain (Note: Represented by Foxhunters Hurlingham) John Beresford; Denis St. George Daly; Foxhall Parker Keene (USA); Frank MacKey (USA); Alfred Rawlinson | Great Britain (Note: Represented by BLO Polo Club Rugby) Walter Buckmaster; Frederick Freake; Walter McCreery (USA); Jean de Madre (FRA) | France (Note: Represented by Bagatelle Polo Club de Paris) Robert Fournier-Sarlovèze; Frederick Agnew Gill (GBR); Maurice Raoul-Duval; Édouard Alphonse James de Rothschild | Mixed team (Note: Represented by Mexico National Polo Team) Eustaquio de Escandón (MEX); Manuel de Escandón (MEX); Pablo de Escandón (MEX); Guillermo Hayden Wright (USA) |

== Rowing ==
| Event | Gold | Silver | Bronze |
|---|---|---|---|
| Single sculls | Hermann Barrelet; France | André Gaudin; France | Saint-George Ashe; Great Britain |
| Coxed pair | Netherlands; Minerva Amsterdam François Brandt; Roelof Klein; Hermanus Brockmann "Unknown French boy" (Note: Brockmann was the coxswain for the Dutch team in the semifinal, but not in the final. He is considered a gold medallist by the IOC and is listed in that organization's medal database.) | France; Société Nautique de la Marne Lucien Martinet; René Waleff unknown cox | France; Rowing Club Castillon Carlos Deltour; Antoine Védrenne; Raoul Paoli |
| Coxed four Final 1 (Note: Due to wrangling about who would be allowed to compete in the coxed four final, two finals were held for that competition. Both finals are considered Olympic championships by the International Olympic Committee.) | France; Cercle de l'Aviron Roubaix Henri Bouckaert; Jean Cau; Émile Delchambre; Henri Hazebrouck; Charlot | France; Club Nautique de Lyon Georges Lumpp; Charles Perrin; Daniel Soubeyran; Émile Wegelin unknown cox | Germany; Favorite Hammonia Wilhelm Carstens; Julius Körner; Adolf Möller; Hugo Rüster; Gustav Moths (Note: The German team changed the coxswain after the semi-final. Gustav Moths participated only in the semi-final and Max Ammermann participated in the final. However, the IOC medal database credits the bronze medal only to Gustav Moths.); Max Ammermann |
| Coxed four Final 2 | Germany; Germania Ruder Club, Hamburg Gustav Goßler; Oscar Goßler; Walther Katzenstein; Waldemar Tietgens; Carl Goßler | Netherlands; Minerva Amsterdam Coenraad Hiebendaal; Geert Lotsij; Paul Lotsij; Johannes Terwogt; Hermanus Brockmann | Germany; Ludwigshafener Ruderverein Ernst Felle; Otto Fickeisen; Carl Lehle; Hermann Wilker; Franz Kröwerath |
| Eight | United States; Vesper Boat Club William Carr; Harry DeBaecke; John Exley; John Geiger; Edwin Hedley; James Juvenal; Roscoe Lockwood; Edward Marsh; Louis Abell | Belgium; Royal Club Nautique de Gand Jules De Bisschop; Prosper Bruggeman; Oscar Dessomville; Oscar De Cock; Maurice Hemelsoet; Marcel Van Crombrugge; Frank Odberg; Maurice Verdonck; Alfred Van Landeghem | Netherlands; Minerva Amsterdam François Brandt; Johannes van Dijk; Roelof Klein; Ruurd Leegstra; Walter Middelberg; Hendrik Offerhaus; Walter Thijssen; Henricus Tromp; Hermanus Brockmann |

== Rugby union ==
| Gold | Silver |
|---|---|
| France; Alexandre Pharamond; Frantz Reichel; Jean Collas; Constantin Henriquez (HAI); Auguste Giroux; André Rischmann; Léon Binoche; Charles Gondouin; André Roosevelt (USA); Hubert Lefèbvre; Émile Sarrade; Wladimir Aïtoff; Joseph Olivier; Jean-Guy Gauthier; Abel Albert; Victor Larchandet; Jean Hervé | Germany (Note: Represented by SC 1880 Frankfurt); Hermann Kreuzer; Arnold Landvoigt; Heinrich Reitz; Jacob Herrmann; Erich Ludwig; Hugo Betting; August Schmierer; Fritz Müller; Adolf Stockhausen; Hans Latscha; Willy Hofmeister; Georg Wenderoth; Eduard Poppe; Richard Ludwig; Albert Amrhein |
| France; Alexandre Pharamond; Frantz Reichel; Jean Collas; Constantin Henriquez (HAI); Auguste Giroux; André Rischmann; Léon Binoche; Charles Gondouin; André Roosevelt (USA); Hubert Lefèbvre; Émile Sarrade; Wladimir Aïtoff; Joseph Olivier; Jean-Guy Gauthier; Abel Albert; Victor Larchandet; Jean Hervé | Great Britain (Note: Represented by Moseley Wanderers) F. C. Bayliss; J. Henry Birtles; James Cantion; Arthur Darby; Clement Deykin; Leslie Hood; M. L. Logan; Herbert Loveitt; Herbert Nicol; V. Smith; M. W. Talbot; Joseph Wallis; Claude Whittindale; Raymond Whittindale; Francis Wilson |

== Sailing ==
The data below notes all races and medalists of the regattas of the Games of the second Olympiad, as well as of the Exposition Universelle and counts all winners as medalists, because the IOC website currently affirms a total of 95 medal events in the Games.

| Event | Gold | Silver | Bronze |
|---|---|---|---|
| Open class | Great Britain; Lorne Currie; John Gretton; Linton Hope; Algernon Maudslay | Germany; Paul Wiesner; Georg Naue; Heinrich Peters; Ottokar Weise | France; Émile Michelet |
| 0 to .5 ton Race 1 | France; Pierre Gervais | France; François Texier; Auguste Texier; Jean-Baptiste Charcot; Robert Linzeler | France; Henri Monnot; Léon Tellier; Gaston Cailleux |
| 0 to .5 ton Race 2 (Note: The second race in this class is also recognized by the IOC. Thus, for this event, two gold, two silver, and two bronze medals were retrospectively awarded.) | France; Émile Sacré | France; François Texier; Auguste Texier; Jean-Baptiste Charcot; Robert Linzeler | France; Pierre Gervais |
| .5 to 1 ton Race 1 | Great Britain; Lorne Currie; John Gretton; Linton Hope; Algernon Maudslay | France; Jules Valton; Félix Marcotte; William Martin; Jacques Baudrier; Jean Le Bret | France; Émile Michelet; Marcel Meran |
| .5 to 1 ton Race 2 (Note: This race in this class is not shown in the IOC database as an Olympic medal event. However, the IOC website currently has affirmed a total of 95 medal events, after accepting, as it appears, the recommendation of Olympic historian Bill Mallon for events that should be considered "Olympic". These events include the other two sailing races.) | France; Louis Auguste-Dormeuil | France; Émile Michelet; Marcel Meran | France; Jules Valton; Félix Marcotte; William Martin; Jacques Baudrier; Jean Le Bret |
| 1 to 2 ton Race 1 | Switzerland; Hermann de Pourtalès; Hélène de Pourtalès; Bernard de Pourtalès | France; François Vilamitjana; Auguste Albert; Albert Duval; Charles Hugo | France; Jacques Baudrier; Lucien Baudrier; Dubosq; Édouard Mantois |
| 1 to 2 ton Race 2 | Germany; Paul Wiesner; Georg Naue; Heinrich Peters; Ottokar Weise | Switzerland; Hermann de Pourtalès; Hélène de Pourtalès; Bernard de Pourtalès | France; François Vilamitjana; Auguste Albert; Albert Duval; Charles Hugo |
| 2 to 3 ton Race 1 | France; William Exshaw ( GBR); Frédéric Blanchy; Jacques Le Lavasseur | France; Léon Susse; Jacques Doucet; Auguste Godinet; Henri Mialaret | France; Ferdinand Schlatter; Gilbert de Cotignon; Émile Jean-Fontaine |
| 2 to 3 ton Race 2 | France; William Exshaw ( GBR); Frédéric Blanchy; Jacques Le Lavasseur | France; Léon Susse; Jacques Doucet; Auguste Godinet; Henri Mialaret | France; Auguste Donny |
| 3 to 10 ton Race 1 | France; Henri Gilardoni | Netherlands; Henri Smulders; Chris Hooykaas; Arie van der Velden | France; Maurice Gufflet; A. Dubois; J. Dubois; Robert Gufflet; Charles Guiraist |
| 3 to 10 ton Race 2 | Great Britain; Howard Taylor; Edward Hore; Harry Jefferson | France; Maurice Gufflet; A. Dubois; J. Dubois; Robert Gufflet; Charles Guiraist | United States; H. MacHenry |
| 10 to 20 ton | France; Émile Billard; Paul Perquer | France; Jean, duc Decazes | Great Britain; Edward Hore |
| 20+ ton | Great Britain; Cecil Quentin | Great Britain; Selwin Calverley | United States; Harry Van Bergen |

== Shooting ==
| Event | Gold | Silver | Bronze |
|---|---|---|---|
| 50 metre free pistol, individual | Karl Röderer; Switzerland | Achille Paroche; France | Konrad Stäheli; Switzerland |
| 50 metre free pistol, team | Switzerland; Friedrich Lüthi; Paul Probst; Louis Richardet; Karl Röderer; Konrad Stäheli | France; Louis Dutfoy; Maurice Lecoq; Léon Moreaux; Achille Paroche; Jules Trinité | Netherlands; Solko van den Bergh; Antonius Bouwens; Dirk Boest Gips; Henrik Sillem; Anthony Sweijs |
| 300 metre free rifle, standing | Lars Jørgen Madsen; Denmark | Ole Østmo; Norway | Charles Paumier; Belgium |
| 300 metre free rifle, kneeling | Konrad Stäheli; Switzerland | Emil Kellenberger; Switzerland Anders Peter Nielsen; Denmark | None awarded |
| 300 metre free rifle, prone | Achille Paroche; France | Anders Peter Nielsen; Denmark | Ole Østmo; Norway |
| 300 metre free rifle, 3 positions | Emil Kellenberger; Switzerland | Anders Peter Nielsen; Denmark | Paul Van Asbroeck; Belgium Ole Østmo; Norway |
| 300 metre free rifle, team | Switzerland; Franz Böckli; Alfred Grütter; Emil Kellenberger; Louis Richardet; Konrad Stäheli | Norway; Olaf Frydenlund; Helmer Hermandsen; Ole Østmo; Ole Sæther; Tom Seeberg | France; Auguste Cavadini; Maurice Lecoq; Léon Moreaux; Achille Paroche; René Thomas |
| Trap shooting | Roger de Barbarin; France | René Guyot; Belgium | Justinien de Clary; France |

== Swimming ==
| Event | Gold | Silver | Bronze |
|---|---|---|---|
| 200 m freestyle | Frederick Lane; Great Britain (Note: As Australian Frederick Lane (AUS) represented a British swim club, his participation and medals are attributed to Great Britain.) | Zoltán Halmay; Hungary | Karl Ruberl; Austria |
| 1000 m freestyle | John Arthur Jarvis; Great Britain | Otto Wahle; Austria | Zoltán Halmay; Hungary |
| 4000 m freestyle | John Arthur Jarvis; Great Britain | Zoltán Halmay; Hungary | Louis Martin; France |
| 200 m backstroke | Ernst Hoppenberg; Germany | Karl Ruberl; Austria | Johannes Drost; Netherlands |
| 200 m team swimming | Germany; Ernst Hoppenberg; Max Hainle; Ernst Lührsen; Gustav Lexau; Herbert von Petersdorff | France; Tritons Lillois; Maurice Hochepied; Victor Hochepied; Joseph Bertrand; Jules Verbecke; Victor Cadet | France; Pupilles de Neptune de Lille; René Tartara; Louis Martin; Désiré Mérchez; Georges Leuillieux; Philippe Houben (Note: Houben did not actually compete; however, he is listed in the IOC's medal database as part of the Neptune team.) |
| 200 m obstacle event | Frederick Lane; Great Britain | Otto Wahle; Austria | Peter Kemp; Great Britain |
| Underwater swimming | Charles Devendeville; France | André Six; France | Peder Lykkeberg; Denmark |

== Tennis ==
| Event | Gold | Silver | Bronze |
|---|---|---|---|
| Men's singles | Laurence Doherty; Great Britain | Harold Mahony; Great Britain | Reginald Doherty; Great Britain |
| Men's singles | Laurence Doherty; Great Britain | Harold Mahony; Great Britain | Arthur Norris; Great Britain |
| Women's singles | Charlotte Cooper; Great Britain | Hélène Prévost; France | Marion Jones; United States |
| Women's singles | Charlotte Cooper; Great Britain | Hélène Prévost; France | Hedwiga Rosenbaumová; Bohemia |
| Men's doubles | Laurence Doherty and Reginald Doherty; Great Britain | Mixed team Max Décugis; France; Basil Spalding de Garmendia; United States | Harold Mahony and Arthur Norris; Great Britain |
| Men's doubles | Laurence Doherty and Reginald Doherty; Great Britain | Mixed team Max Décugis; France; Basil Spalding de Garmendia; United States | André Prévost and Guy de la Chapelle; France |
| Mixed doubles | Charlotte Cooper and Reginald Doherty; Great Britain | Mixed team Hélène Prévost; France; Harold Mahony; Great Britain | Mixed team Marion Jones; United States; Laurence Doherty; Great Britain |
| Mixed doubles | Charlotte Cooper and Reginald Doherty; Great Britain | Mixed team Hélène Prévost; France; Harold Mahony; Great Britain | Mixed team Archibald Warden; Great Britain; Hedwiga Rosenbaumová; Bohemia |

== Tug of war ==
| Gold | Silver |
|---|---|
| Mixed team Edgar Aabye (DEN); August Nilsson (SWE); Eugen Schmidt (DEN); Gustaf Söderström (SWE); Karl Staaf (SWE); Charles Winckler (DEN) | France Roger Basset; Jean Collas; Charles Gondouin; Joseph Roffo; Émile Sarrade; Francisco Henríquez de Zubiría (COL) |

== Water polo ==
| Gold | Silver | Bronze |
|---|---|---|
| Great Britain (Osborne Swimming Club of Manchester) Thomas Coe; Robert Crawshaw; William Henry; John Arthur Jarvis; Peter Kemp; Victor Lindberg (NZL); Frederick Stapleton | Belgium (Brussels Swimming and Water Polo Club) Jean de Backer; Victor de Behr; Henri Cohen; Fernand Feyaerts; Oscar Grégoire; Albert Michant; Georges Romer; Guillaume Séron; Victor Sonnemans; A. R. Upton | France (Libellule de Paris) Bill Burgess (GBR); Jules Clévenot; Alphonse Decuyper; Louis Laufray; Henri Peslier; Auguste Pesloy; Paul Vasseur |
| Great Britain (Osborne Swimming Club of Manchester) Thomas Coe; Robert Crawshaw; William Henry; John Arthur Jarvis; Peter Kemp; Victor Lindberg (NZL); Frederick Stapleton | Belgium (Brussels Swimming and Water Polo Club) Jean de Backer; Victor de Behr; Henri Cohen; Fernand Feyaerts; Oscar Grégoire; Albert Michant; Georges Romer; Guillaume Séron; Victor Sonnemans; A. R. Upton | France (Pupilles de Neptune de Lille) Auguste Camelin; Eugène Coulon; Jean Fardelle; Antoine Fiolet; Pierre Gellé; Louis Marc; Louis Martin; Désiré Mérchez |

== See also ==
- 1900 Summer Olympics medal table

== Notes ==
Main notes

Subnotes
