= Coxed four at the Olympics =

Olympic sport

Coxed four at the Olympic Games
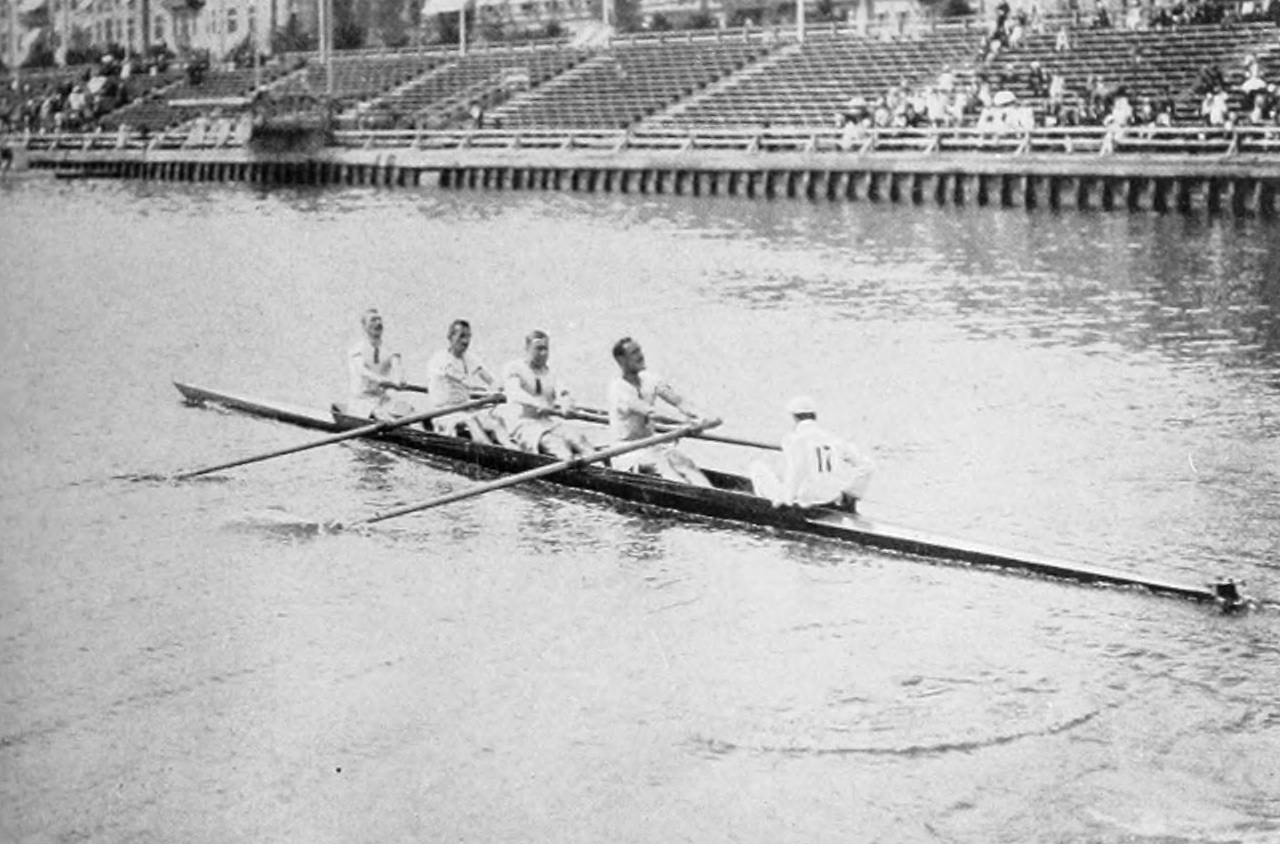
- Coxed four at the 1912 Summer Olympics

Overview
- Sport: Rowing
- Gender: Men and women
- Years held: Men: 1900, 1912–1992; Women: 1976–1988

Reigning champion
- Men: Romania; Iulică Ruican; Viorel Talapan; Dimitrie Popescu; Nicolae Țaga; Dumitru Răducanu (cox)
- Women: East Germany; Martina Walther; Gerlinde Doberschütz; Carola Hornig; Birte Siech; Sylvia Rose (cox)

The coxed four was a rowing event held at the Summer Olympics. The event was first held for men at the second modern Olympics in 1900. It was not held in 1904 or 1908. It returned in 1912 with two versions: the standard one as well as one with inriggers (the only time that version was held). It continued to be held for men until it was removed from the programme following the 1992 Games, at which point it and the men's coxed pair were replaced with the men's lightweight double sculls and men's lightweight coxless four. The women's event was added when women's rowing was added to the Olympic programme in 1976. It was held each year through 1988, when it was replaced with the women's coxless four.

== Medalists ==
=== Men ===
Games	Gold	Silver	Bronze
1900 Paris	France Henri Bouckaert, Jean Cau, Émile Delchambre, Henri Hazebrouck, Charlot (cox) Germany Gustav Goßler, Oscar Goßler, Walther Katzenstein, Waldemar Tietgens, Carl Goßler (cox)	France Georges Lumpp, Charles Perrin, Daniel Soubeyran, Émile Wegelin, Unknown (cox) Netherlands Coenraad Hiebendaal, Geert Lotsij, Paul Lotsij, Johannes Terwogt, Hermanus Brockmann (cox)	Germany Wilhelm Carstens, Julius Körner, Adolf Möller, Hugo Rüster, Gustav Moths (cox), Max Ammermann (cox) Germany Ernst Felle, Otto Fickeisen, Carl Lehle, Hermann Wilker, Franz Kröwerath (cox)
1912 Stockholm	Germany Albert Arnheiter, Hermann Wilker, Rudolf Fickeisen, Otto Fickeisen, Karl Leister (cox)	Great Britain Julius Beresford, Karl Vernon, Charles Rought, Bruce Logan, Geoffrey Carr (cox)	Denmark Erik Bisgaard, Rasmus Frandsen, Mikael Simonsen, Poul Thymann, Ejgil Clemmensen (cox)
1920 Antwerp	Switzerland Willy Brüderlin, Max Rudolf, Paul Rudolf, Hans Walter, Paul Staub (cox)	United States Erich Federschmidt, Franz Federschmidt, Carl Klose, Ken Myers, Sherm Clark (cox)	Norway Per Gulbrandsen, Theodor Klem, Henry Larsen, Birger Var, Thoralf Hagen (cox)
1924 Paris	Switzerland Émile Albrecht, Alfred Probst, Eugen Sigg, Hans Walter, Émile Lachapelle (cox), Walter Loosli (cox)	France Eugène Constant, Louis Gressier, Georges Lecointe, Raymond Talleux, Marcel Lepan (cox)	United States Bob Gerhardt, Sid Jelinek, Ed Mitchell, Henry Welsford, John Kennedy (cox)
1928 Amsterdam	Italy Valerio Perentin, Giliante D'Este, Nicolò Vittori, Giovanni Delise, Renato Petronio (cox)	Switzerland Ernst Haas, Joseph Meyer, Otto Bucher, Karl Schwegler, Fritz Bösch (cox)	Poland Franciszek Bronikowski, Edmund Jankowski, Leon Birkholc, Bernard Ormanowski, Bolesław Drewek (cox)
1932 Los Angeles	Germany Hans Eller, Horst Hoeck, Walter Meyer, Joachim Spremberg, Carlheinz Neumann (cox)	Italy Riccardo Divora, Bruno Parovel, Giovanni Plazzer, Bruno Vattovaz, Guerrino Scher (cox)	Poland Jerzy Braun, Edward Kobyliński, Janusz Ślązak, Stanisław Urban, Jerzy Skolimowski (cox)
1936 Berlin	Germany Hans Maier, Walter Volle, Ernst Gaber, Paul Söllner, Fritz Bauer (cox)	Switzerland Hermann Betschart, Hans Homberger, Alex Homberger, Karl Schmid, Rolf Spring (cox)	France Fernand Vandernotte, Marcel Vandernotte, Jean Cosmat, Marcel Chauvigné, Noël Vandernotte (cox)
1948 London	United States Warren Westlund, Bob Martin, Bob Will, Gordy Giovanelli, Allen Morgan (cox)	Switzerland Rudolf Reichling, Erich Schriever, Émile Knecht, Peter Stebler, André Moccand (cox)	Denmark Erik Larsen, Børge Raahauge Nielsen, Henry Larsen, Harry Knudsen, Ib Olsen (cox)
1952 Helsinki	Czechoslovakia Karel Mejta Sr, Jiří Havlis, Jan Jindra, Stanislav Lusk, Miroslav Koranda (cox)	Switzerland Rico Bianchi, Karl Weidmann, Heini Scheller, Émile Ess, Walter Leiser (cox)	United States Carl Lovsted, Al Ulbrickson, Richard Wahlstrom, Matt Leanderson, Al Rossi (cox)
1956 Melbourne	Italy Alberto Winkler, Romano Sgheiz, Angelo Vanzin, Franco Trincavelli, Ivo Stefanoni (cox)	Sweden Olle Larsson, Gösta Eriksson, Ivar Aronsson, Evert Gunnarsson, Bertil Göransson (cox)	Finland Kauko Hänninen, Reino Poutanen, Veli Lehtelä, Toimi Pitkänen, Matti Niemi (cox)
1960 Rome	United Team of Germany Gerd Cintl, Horst Effertz, Klaus Riekemann, Jürgen Litz, Michael Obst (cox)	France Robert Dumontois, Claude Martin, Jacques Morel, Guy Nosbaum, Jean Klein (cox)	Italy Fulvio Balatti, Romano Sgheiz, Franco Trincavelli, Giovanni Zucchi, Ivo Stefanoni (cox)
1964 Tokyo	United Team of Germany Peter Neusel, Bernhard Britting, Joachim Werner, Egbert Hirschfelder, Jürgen Oelke (cox)	Italy Renato Bosatta, Emilio Trivini, Giuseppe Galante, Franco De Pedrina, Giovanni Spinola (cox)	Netherlands Lex Mullink, Jan van de Graaff, Freek van de Graaff, Bobbie van de Graaf, Marius Klumperbeek (cox)
1968 Mexico City	New Zealand Dick Joyce, Ross Collinge, Dudley Storey, Warren Cole, Simon Dickie (cox)	East Germany Peter Kremtz, Manfred Gelpke, Roland Göhler, Klaus Jacob, Dieter Semetzky (cox)	Switzerland Denis Oswald, Peter Bolliger, Hugo Waser, Jakob Grob, Gottlieb Fröhlich (cox)
1972 Munich	West Germany Peter Berger, Hans-Johann Färber, Gerhard Auer, Alois Bierl, Uwe Benter (cox)	East Germany Dietrich Zander, Reinhard Gust, Eckhard Martens, Rolf Jobst, Klaus-Dieter Ludwig (cox)	Czechoslovakia Otakar Mareček, Karel Neffe, Vladimír Jánoš, František Provazník, Vladimír Petříček (cox)
1976 Montreal	Soviet Union Vladimir Eshinov, Nikolay Ivanov, Mikhail Kuznetsov, Aleksandr Klepikov, Aleksandr Sema, Aleksandr Lukyanov (cox)	East Germany Andreas Schulz, Rüdiger Kunze, Walter Dießner, Ullrich Dießner, Johannes Thomas (cox)	West Germany Hans-Johann Färber, Ralph Kubail, Siegfried Fricke, Peter Niehusen, Hartmut Wenzel (cox)
1980 Moscow	East Germany Dieter Wendisch, Walter Dießner, Ullrich Dießner, Gottfried Döhn, Andreas Gregor (cox)	Soviet Union Artūrs Garonskis, Dimants Krišjānis, Dzintars Krišjānis, Žoržs Tikmers, Juris Bērziņš (cox)	Poland Grzegorz Stellak, Adam Tomasiak, Grzegorz Nowak, Ryszard Stadniuk, Ryszard Kubiak (cox)
1984 Los Angeles	Great Britain Martin Cross, Richard Budgett, Andy Holmes, Steve Redgrave, Adrian Ellison (cox)	United States Thomas Kiefer, Gregory Springer, Michael Bach, Edward Ives, John Stillings (cox)	New Zealand Kevin Lawton, Don Symon, Barrie Mabbott, Ross Tong, Brett Hollister (cox)
1988 Seoul	East Germany Bernd Niesecke, Karsten Schmeling, Bernd Eichwurzel, Frank Klawonn, Hendrik Reiher (cox)	Romania Dimitrie Popescu, Ioan Snep, Vasile Tomoiagă, Valentin Robu, Ladislau Lovrenschi (cox)	New Zealand Chris White, Ian Wright, Greg Johnston, George Keys, Andrew Bird (cox)
1992 Barcelona	Romania Iulică Ruican, Viorel Talapan, Dimitrie Popescu, Nicolae Țaga, Dumitru Răducanu (cox)	Germany Ralf Brudel, Uwe Kellner, Thoralf Peters, Karsten Finger, Hendrik Reiher (cox)	Poland Wojciech Jankowski, Maciej Łasicki, Jacek Streich, Tomasz Tomiak, Michał Cieślak (cox)

==== Multiple medalists ====
Rank	Gymnast	Nation	Olympics	Gold	Silver	Bronze	Total
1	Hans Walter	Switzerland	1920–1924	2	0	0	2
2	Ullrich Dießner	East Germany	1976–1980	1	1	0	2
2	Walter Dießner	East Germany	1976–1980	1	1	0	2
2	Dimitrie Popescu	Romania	1988–1992	1	1	0	2
2	Hendrik Reiher	East Germany; Germany	1988–1992	1	1	0	2
6	Romano Sgheiz	Italy	1956–1960	1	0	1	2
6	Ivo Stefanoni	Italy	1956–1960	1	0	1	2
6	Franco Trincavelli	Italy	1956–1960	1	0	1	2
6	Hans-Johann Färber	West Germany	1972–1976	1	0	1	2

==== Medalists by country ====
Rank	Nation	Gold	Silver	Bronze	Total
1	Germany	4	1	2	7
2	Switzerland	2	4	1	7
3	East Germany	2	3	0	5
4	Italy	2	2	1	5
5	United Team of Germany	2	0	0	2
6	France	1	3	1	5
7	United States	1	2	2	5
8	Great Britain	1	1	0	2
8	Romania	1	1	0	2
8	Soviet Union	1	1	0	2
11	New Zealand	1	0	2	3
12	Czechoslovakia	1	0	1	2
12	West Germany	1	0	1	2
14	Netherlands	0	1	1	2
15	Sweden	0	1	0	1
16	Poland	0	0	4	4
17	Denmark	0	0	2	2
18	Finland	0	0	1	1
18	Norway	0	0	1	1

=== Women ===
Games	Gold	Silver	Bronze
1976 Montreal	East Germany Karin Metze, Bianka Schwede, Gabriele Lohs, Andrea Kurth, Sabine Heß (cox)	Bulgaria Ginka Gyurova, Lilyana Vaseva, Reni Yordanova, Mariyka Modeva, Kapka Georgieva (cox)	Soviet Union Nadezhda Sevostyanova, Lyudmila Krokhina, Galina Mishenina, Anna Pasokha, Lidiya Krylova (cox)
1980 Moscow	East Germany Ramona Kapheim, Silvia Fröhlich, Angelika Noack, Romy Saalfeld, Kirsten Wenzel (cox)	Bulgaria Ginka Gyurova, Mariyka Modeva, Rita Todorova, Iskra Velinova, Nadiya Filipova (cox)	Soviet Union Mariya Fadeyeva, Galina Sovetnikova, Marina Studneva, Svetlana Semyonova, Nina Cheremisina (cox)
1984 Los Angeles	Romania Florica Lavric, Maria Fricioiu, Chira Apostol, Olga Bularda, Viorica Ioja (cox)	Canada Marilyn Brain, Angela Schneider, Barbara Armbrust, Jane Tregunno, Lesley Thompson (cox)	Australia Robyn Grey-Gardner, Karen Brancourt, Susan Chapman, Margot Foster, Susan Lee (cox)
1988 Seoul	East Germany Martina Walther, Gerlinde Doberschütz, Carola Hornig, Birte Siech, Sylvia Rose (cox)	China Zhang Xianghua, Hu Yadong, Yang Xiao, Zhou Shouying, Li Ronghua (cox)	Romania Marioara Trașcă, Veronica Necula, Herta Anitaș, Doina Șnep-Bălan, Ecaterina Oancia (cox)

==== Multiple medalists ====
Rank	Gymnast	Nation	Olympics	Gold	Silver	Bronze	Total
1	Ginka Gyurova	Bulgaria	1976–1980	0	2	0	2

==== Medalists by country ====
Rank	Nation	Gold	Silver	Bronze	Total
1	East Germany	3	0	0	3
2	Romania	1	0	1	2
3	Bulgaria	0	2	0	2
4	Canada	0	1	0	1
4	China	0	1	0	1
6	Soviet Union	0	0	2	2
7	Australia	0	0	1	1

=== Men with Inriggers ===
Games	Gold	Silver	Bronze
1912 Stockholm	Denmark Ejler Allert, Christian Hansen, Carl Møller, Carl Pedersen, Poul Hartmann (cox)	Sweden Ture Rosvall, William Bruhn-Möller, Conrad Brunkman, Herman Dahlbäck, Leo Wilkens (cox)	Norway Claus Høyer, Reidar Holter, Max Herseth, Frithjof Olstad, Olav Bjørnstad (cox)
