= Rowing at the 1900 Summer Olympics =

Rowing at the Games of the II Olympiad
- Venue: Seine
- Dates: 25–26 August 1900
- Competitors: 108 from 8 nations

Location of the regatta venue

At the 1900 Summer Olympics in Paris, four events in rowing were contested, marking the introduction of the sport to the Olympic program. At the inaugural 1896 Games, the rowing competition was cancelled due to strong winds. The 1900 regatta was held on the Seine between the Courbevoie Bridge and the Asnières Bridge on 25 and 26 August. The length of the regatta course was 1,750 metres (5,740 ft; 1.09 mi). Two finals were held in the coxed four competition, with both finals being considered Olympic championships. Thus, there were a total of five rowing championships awarded.

== Medal summary ==
Event	Gold	Silver	Bronze
Single sculls	Hermann Barrelet (FRA)	André Gaudin (FRA)	Saint-George Ashe (GBR)
Coxed pair	Netherlands; Minerva Amsterdam François Brandt (NED); Roelof Klein (NED); Hermanus Brockmann (NED) unknown boy (FRA)	France; Société Nautique de la Marne Lucien Martinet; René Waleff unknown cox	France; Rowing Club Castillon Carlos Deltour; Antoine Védrenne; Raoul Paoli
Coxed four Final 1	France; Cercle de l'Aviron Roubaix Henri Bouckaert; Jean Cau; Émile Delchambre; Henri Hazebrouck; Charlot	France; Club Nautique de Lyon Georges Lumpp; Charles Perrin; Daniel Soubeyran; Émile Wegelin unknown cox	Germany; Favorite Hammonia Wilhelm Carstens; Julius Körner; Adolf Möller; Hugo Rüster; Gustav Moths; Max Ammermann
Coxed four Final 2	Germany; Germania Ruder Club, Hamburg Gustav Goßler; Oscar Goßler; Walther Katzenstein; Waldemar Tietgens; Carl Goßler	Netherlands; Minerva Amsterdam Coenraad Hiebendaal; Geert Lotsij; Paul Lotsij; Johannes Terwogt; Hermanus Brockmann	Germany; Ludwigshafener Ruderverein Ernst Felle; Otto Fickeisen; Carl Lehle; Hermann Wilker; Franz Kröwerath
Eight	United States; Vesper Boat Club William Carr; Harry DeBaecke; John Exley; John Geiger; Edwin Hedley; James Juvenal; Roscoe Lockwood; Edward Marsh; Louis Abell	Belgium; Royal Club Nautique de Gand Jules De Bisschop; Prosper Bruggeman; Oscar Dessomville; Oscar De Cock; Maurice Hemelsoet; Marcel Van Crombrugge; Frank Odberg; Maurice Verdonck; Alfred Van Landeghem	Netherlands; Minerva Amsterdam François Brandt; Johannes van Dijk; Roelof Klein; Ruurd Leegstra; Walter Middelberg; Hendrik Offerhaus; Walter Thijssen; Henricus Tromp; Hermanus Brockmann

== Participating nations ==
A total of 108 rowers from 8 nations competed at the Paris Games:

- Belgium (11)
- France (47)
- Germany (21)
- Great Britain (1)
- Italy (1)
- Netherlands (13)
- Spain (5)
- United States (9)

== Medal table ==
Rank	Nation	Gold	Silver	Bronze	Total
1	France	2	3	1	6
2	Netherlands	1	1	1	3
3	Germany	1	0	2	3
4	United States	1	0	0	1
5	Belgium	0	1	0	1
6	Great Britain	0	0	1	1
Totals (6 entries)		5	5	5	15

== Coxswain mystery ==
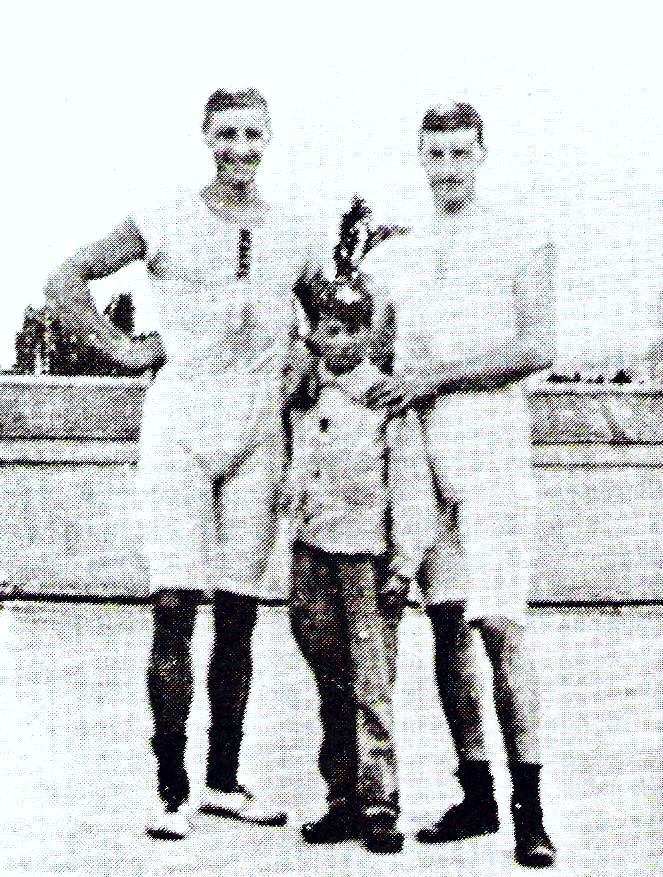
François Brandt (left), Roelof Klein and their coxswain, after the coxed pair final at the 1900 Olympics

In the coxed pair event, the names of the coxswains for six of the seven crews entered are not known. Most of these were young French boys weighing about 25 kg, which the French crews employed to their advantage. The winning Dutch crew decided, after losing their heat, that their own coxswain was too heavy, and they recruited a French boy to steer the boat for the finals. The lad, name unknown, is believed likely to be the youngest Olympic gold medalist ever (previously estimated as between 7 and 10 years of age). Some estimate the boy was likely 12 to 14 years old. One researcher has made a case that this unknown cox could have been Giorgi Nikoladze (1888-1931) of Georgia, a future scientist and promulgator of Georgian sport.
