= Germany at the 1900 Summer Olympics =

- Flag of the German Empire
- IOC code: GER
- NOC: National Olympic Committee for Germany

in Paris
- Competitors: 76 in 10 sports
- Medals Ranked 7th: Gold 4 Silver 3 Bronze 2 Total 9

Summer Olympics appearances (overview)
- 1896; 1900; 1904; 1908; 1912; 1920–1924; 1928; 1932; 1936; 1948; 1952; 1956–1988; 1992; 1996; 2000; 2004; 2008; 2012; 2016; 2020; 2024

Other related appearances
- 1906 Intercalated Games –––– Saar (1952); United Team of Germany (1956–1964); East Germany (1968–1988); West Germany (1968–1988)

Germany competed at the 1900 Summer Olympics in Paris, France.

== Medalists ==
Germany finished in seventh position in the final medal rankings, with four gold medals and nine medals overall.

Medal	Name	Sport	Event
Gold	Ernst Hoppenberg	Swimming	Men's 200 m backstroke
Gold	Germania Ruder Club, Hamburg	Rowing	Coxed four
Gold	Deutscher Schwimm Verband Berlin	Swimming	men's 200 m team swimming
Gold	Georg Naue; Heinrich Peters; Ottokar Weise; Paul Wiesner	Sailing	1-2 ton race 2
Silver	Karl Duill	Cycling	points race
Silver	Georg Naue; Heinrich Peters; Ottokar Weise; Paul Wiesner	Sailing	open class
Silver	SC 1880 Frankfurt	Rugby	men's competition
Bronze	Favorite Hammonia	Rowing	Coxed four
Bronze	Ludwigshafener Ruderverein	Rowing	Coxed four

== Results by event ==
=== Aquatics ===
==== Swimming ====
Germany's first appearance in swimming came in 1900. The German team took gold in the team event. Hoppenberg also earned a gold medal in the backstroke.

Swimmer	Event	Semifinals		Final	
Swimmer	Event	Result	Rank	Result	Rank
Julius Frey	Men's 200 metre freestyle	2:50.4	3 q	2:58.2	8
Max Hainle	Men's 1000 metre freestyle	15:54.0	1 Q	15:22.6	4
Ernst Hoppenberg	Men's 200 metre backstroke	2:54.4	1 Q	2:47.0	1st place, gold medalist(s)
Hans Aniol	Men's underwater swimming	—		103.9	6
German Swimming Federation (Note: This is the roster according to the IOC database. Petersdorff did not actually swim, but was on the team. Mallon and de Wael both replace Frey and Schöne with Gustav Lexau and Ernest Luhrsen.): Julius Frey; Max Hainle; Ernst Hoppenberg; Herbert von Petersdorff; Max Schöne	Men's 200 metre team swimming	—		33	1st place, gold medalist(s)

==== Water polo ====
Germany competed in the inaugural men's water polo tournament. The German team was defeated in its first game, splitting 5th place with the other 2 quarterfinal losers.

Team	Event	Quarterfinals	Semifinals	Final	Rank
Team	Event	Opposition Result	Opposition Result	Opposition Result	Rank
Berliner Swimming Club Otter: Hans Aniol; Paul Gebauer; Max Hainle; Georg Hax; Gustav Lexau; Herbert von Petersdorff; Fritz Schneider	Men's water polo	Pupilles de Neptune de Lille #2 (FRA); L 3-2	did not advance		5

=== Athletics ===
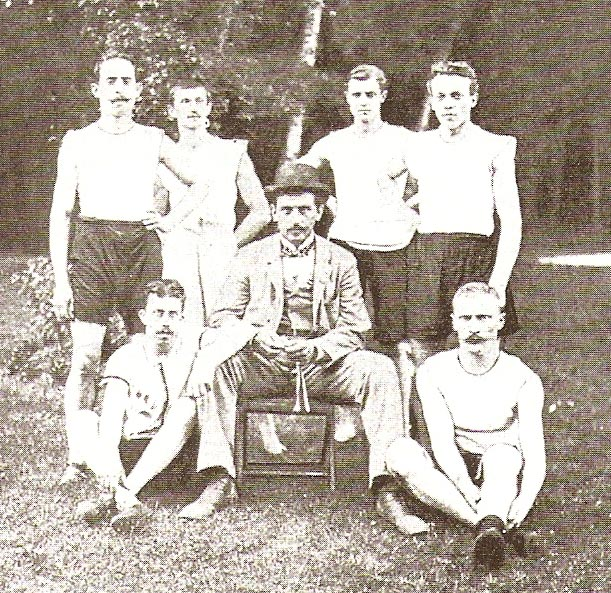
Germany athletics team

Six German athletes had 10 entries in nine athletics events, not winning any medals.

Track events

Athlete	Event	Heat		Semifinal		Final	
Athlete	Event	Result	Rank	Result	Rank	Result	Rank
Kurt Doerry	100 m	11.5	2 Q	DNF		Did not advance	
Julius Keyl	100 m	Unknown	4	Did not advance			
Albert Werkmüller	200 m	Unknown	4	—		Did not advance	
Gustav Rau	200 m hurdles	Unknown	5	—		Did not advance	
Franz Duhne	2500 m steeplechase	—				Unknown	6
Franz Duhne	4000 m steeplechase	—				Unknown	6

Field events

Athlete	Event	Qualifying		Final	
Athlete	Event	Result	Rank	Result	Rank
Waldemar Steffen	High jump	n/a		1.70	4
Waldemar Steffen	Long jump	6.30	8	Did not advance	
Waldemar Steffen	Triple jump	n/a		Unknown	Unknown
Waldemar Steffen	Standing triple jump	n/a		Unknown	5–10

=== Cycling ===
The second Olympic cycling competition saw Germany appear for its second time. Duill won a silver medal in the points race.

Cyclist	Event	Round 1		Quarterfinals		Semifinals		Final	
Cyclist	Event	Result	Rank	Result	Rank	Result	Rank	Result	Rank
Georg Drescher	Men's sprint	Unknown	4–8	did not advance					
Karl Duill	Men's sprint	1:35.4	1 Q	Unknown	2	did not advance			
Paul Gottron	Men's sprint	1:32.4	1 Q	Unknown	2	did not advance			
Paul Gottron	Men's 25 kilometres	—						DNF	—

Cyclist	Event	Prime 1	Prime 2	Prime 3	Prime 4	Prime 5	Prime 6	Prime 7	Prime 8	Prime 9	Prime 10	Total	Rank
Karl Duill	Men's points race	0	0	1	0	0	3	3	0	2	0	9	2nd place, silver medalist(s)

=== Equestrian ===
Germany had one equestrian at the first Olympic equestrian competition.

Equestrian	Horse	Event	Result	Rank
Max Guilleaume	—	Mail coach	Unknown	5–31

=== Fencing ===
Germany first competed in fencing at the Olympics in the sport's second appearance. The nation sent one fencer and sometimes claims a second—Willy Sulzbacher was a French national living in France, but competed for German fencing club Deutscher und Österreichischer Fechterbund.

Fencer	Event	Round 1		Quarterfinals		Repechage		Semifinals		Final	
Fencer	Event	Result	Rank	Result	Rank	Result	Rank	Result	Rank	Result	Rank
Alfons Schöne	Men's sabre	Unknown	5–6	—				did not advance			

=== Gymnastics ===
Germany, which had dominated the first gymnastics competitions four years earlier, failed to win a medal in the second Olympic gymnastics competition.

Gymnast	Event	Score	Rank
Franz Abbé	Men's artistic individual all-around	219	77
Fritz Danner	Men's artistic individual all-around	216	79
Gustav Felix Flatow	Men's artistic individual all-around	204	102
Eugen Fürstenberger	Men's artistic individual all-around	240	53
Richard Genserowski	Men's artistic individual all-around	238	54
Erwin Willi Kurtz	Men's artistic individual all-around	216	79
Fritz Manteuffel	Men's artistic individual all-around	223	72
Oscar Naumann	Men's artistic individual all-around	DNF	–
Julius Nuninger	Men's artistic individual all-around	199	107
Hugo Peitsch	Men's artistic individual all-around	252	29
Emil Rotong	Men's artistic individual all-around	234	59
Fritz Sauer	Men's artistic individual all-around	214	84
Adolf Tannert	Men's artistic individual all-around	180	118
Carl Wiegand	Men's artistic individual all-around	224	71

=== Rowing ===
Germany competed in the first Olympic rowing events, represented by 4 boats. In the coxed four, where two separate finals were held, the 3 German boats took one gold and one bronze in the "B" final and another bronze in the "A" final. The eight boat placed 4th.

Boat	Event	Round 1		Semifinals		Final	
Boat	Event	Result	Rank	Result	Rank	Result	Rank
Germania Ruder Club, Hamburg: Gustav Goßler; Oscar Goßler; Walther Katzenstein; Waldemar Tietgens; Carl Heinrich Goßler (cox)	Men's coxed four	—		5:56.2	1 QB	5:59.0	1st place, gold medalist(s)
Favorite Hammonia: Wilhelm Carstens; Julius Körner; Adolf Möller; Hugo Rüster; Max Ammermann (cox)	Men's coxed four	—		6:03.0	3 QA	7:18.2	3rd place, bronze medalist(s)
Ludwigshafener Ruderverein: Ernst Felle; Otto Fickeisen; Carl Lehle; Hermann Wilker; Franz Kröwerath (cox)	Men's coxed four	—		6:14.0	1 QB	6:05.0	3rd place, bronze medalist(s)
Germania Ruder Club, Hamburg: Gustav Goßler; Oscar Goßler; Ernst Jencquel; Edgar Katzenstein; Walther Katzenstein; Theodor Laurezzari; Waldemar Tietgens; Arthur Warncke; Alexander Gleichmann (Note: Gleichmann was the coxswain for the semifinal, but not for the final. The name of the coxswain Hamburg used for the final is unknown.); unknown cox	Men's eight	—		5:04.8	3 Q	6:33.0	4

=== Rugby ===
Germany was one of three teams to compete in the first Olympic rugby games. Germany lost its only game, against France. The game against Great Britain was cancelled due to travel plans.

Summary

Team	Event	Match 1	Match 2	Rank
Team	Event	Opposition Result	Opposition Result	Rank
SC 1880 Frankfurt	Men's rugby	France; L 27-17	—	2nd place, silver medalist(s)

Match 1

14 Oct

France	27–17	Germany
	Report	Try: E Ludwig, Reitz, Schmierer; Con: Schmierer (2); Drop: Schmierer

Vélodrome de Vincennes, Paris
Attendance: 3,500
Referee: FC Potter-Irwin (England)

Team details

France	Germany

Alexandre Pharamond	15	Hermann Kreuzer
Frantz Reichel	14	Arnold Landvoigt
Jean Collas	13	Heinrich Reitz
Constantin Henriquez	12	Jacob Hermann
Andre Rischmann	11	Erich Ludwig
A. Albert	10	Hugo Betting
Leon Binoche	9	August Schmierer
Jean Herve	8	Albert Amrhein (c)
Victor Lardanchet	7	Richard Ludwig
Jean-Guy Gautier	6	Eduard Poppe
Joseph Olivier (c)	5	Georg Wenderoth
Wladimir Aitoff	4	Willy Hofmeister
Emile Sarrade	3	Hans Latscha
Hubert Lefebvre	2	Adolf Stockhausen
Andre Roosevelt	1	Fritz Muller

=== Sailing ===
Germany's four sailors were fairly successful in the 1900 events, taking 2 medals. They took the silver medal in the open class and the gold in the 1-2 ton, but disqualified from the ½-1 ton class for being overweight.

Sailors	Event	Time	Rank
Georg Naue; Heinrich Peters; Ottokar Weise; Paul Wiesner	½–1 ton class race 1	DQ	–
Georg Naue; Heinrich Peters; Ottokar Weise; Paul Wiesner	1–2 ton class race 2	3:09:19	1st place, gold medalist(s)
Georg Naue; Heinrich Peters; Ottokar Weise; Paul Wiesner	Open class	5:58:17	2nd place, silver medalist(s)
