= Rowing at the 1900 Summer Olympics – Men's coxed four =

Men's coxed fours at the Games of the II Olympiad
- Rowing pictogram
- Venue: Seine
- Dates: 25–26 August 1900
- Competitors: 51 from 4 nations
- Winning time: 7:11.0; 5:59.0

Medalists
1st place, gold medalist(s)		Cercle de l'Aviron Roubaix; France
1st place, gold medalist(s)		Der Hamburger und Germania Ruder Club; Germany
2nd place, silver medalist(s)		Club Nautique de Lyon; France
2nd place, silver medalist(s)		Minerva Amsterdam; Netherlands
3rd place, bronze medalist(s)		Favorite Hammonia; Germany
3rd place, bronze medalist(s)		Ludwigshafener Ruderverein; Germany

The men's coxed four was one of the competitions in the Rowing at the 1900 Summer Olympics events in Paris. The competition was plagued by controversy involving which boats should advance to the final. In one of the most unusual decisions in Olympic history, two separate finals were held for the event, each of which is still considered an Olympic championship by the International Olympic Committee. The crews of all six boats to compete in the two finals are Olympic medallists.

The coxed four event was held from 25 to 26 August 1900. Ten boats, involving fifty-one rowers from four nations, competed. The first final, featuring the three fastest losers from the semifinals, was won by a crew from the Cercle de l'Aviron Roubaix club of France, with another French crew (Club Nautique de Lyon) coming second and German team Favorite Hammonia third. The second final, featuring the semifinal winners, was won by Der Hamburger und Germania Ruder Club of Germany, with Dutch side Minerva Amsterdam finishing second and German crew Ludwigshafener Ruderverein third.

== Background ==
This was the first appearance of the event. Rowing had been on the programme in 1896 but was cancelled due to bad weather. The coxed four was one of the four initial events introduced in 1900. It was not held in 1904 or 1908, but was held at every Games from 1912 to 1992 when it (along with the men's coxed pair) was replaced with the men's lightweight double sculls and men's lightweight coxless four.

== Competition format ==
The coxed four event featured five-person boats, with four rowers and a coxswain. It was a sweep rowing event, with the rowers each having one oar (and thus each rowing on one side). The tournament featured two rounds: semifinals and a final. There were three semifinals, each with three or four boats.

The original format provided for the three semifinal winners, plus the second-place boat in the third semifinal (with four competitors), advancing to the final. In other words, the last two boats in each semifinal would be eliminated.

The distance for each race was 1750 metres, rather than the 2000 metres which was becoming standard even at the time (and has been used in the Olympics since 1912, except in 1948).

=== Controversy ===
After the runner-up in the second semifinal and the third-place boat in the third semifinal, who should have been eliminated, had faster times than the winner of the first semifinal, the officials decided to hold another qualifying race. However, as the officials could not contact all of the teams involved, this race was scratched.

The officials later decided to have a six-boat final with the semifinal winners and the three fastest losers competing: as the course had been designed for a maximum of four boats, this was a preposterous decision, and the semifinal winners boycotted the final in protest.

Following this fiasco, the officials decided to have a second final with the three semifinal winners plus the winner of the first final (Cercle de l'Aviron Roubaix) competing. However, this decision would have seen the first final become a de facto repechage: for this reason, as well as the fact they had already won the event under the rules in effect when the first final was held, the Cercle de l'Aviron Roubaix rowers flatly declined to compete in the second final.

Thus, the second final consisted only of the semifinal winners, resulting in two sets of medals being awarded for the event.

== Schedule ==
Date	Time	Round
Saturday, 25 August 1900	16:15	Semifinals
Sunday, 26 August 1900	14:00	Finals

== Results ==
=== Semifinals ===
Initially, the top boat in each semifinal plus the runner-up in the third semifinal (which had four boats instead of the three boats competing in each of the other two), were to advance. Following protests which ensued after the runner-up in the second semifinal and the third-place boat in the third semifinal each posted better times than the winner of the first, the qualification rules for the final were altered. Eventually, the six boats were broken into two groups and competed in separate finals. The runners-up in semifinals 2 and 3 as well as the third-place boat in semifinal 3 competed in the first final, while the three semifinal winners competed in the second.

==== Semifinal 1 ====
Rank	Boat	Rowers	Coxswain	Nation	Time	Notes
1	Ludwigshafener Ruderverein	Ernst Felle; Otto Fickeisen; Carl Lehle; Hermann Wilker	Franz Kröwerath	Germany	6:14.0	Q2
2	Royal Barcelona Maritime Club	Juan Camps; José Fórmica; Ricardo Margarit; Orestes Quintana	Antonio Vela	Spain	6:38.4	
3	Club Nautique de France	René Beslaud; Léon Deslinières; Peyronnie; Saurel	Unknown	France	6:40.0	

==== Semifinal 2 ====
Rank	Boat	Rowers	Coxswain	Nation	Time	Notes
1	Minerva Amsterdam	Coenraad Hiebendaal; Geert Lotsij; Paul Lotsij; Johannes Terwogt	Hermanus Brockmann	Netherlands	6:02.0	Q2
2	Club Nautique de Lyon	Georges Lumpp; Charles Perrin; Daniel Soubeyran; Émile Wegelin	Unknown	France	6:06.2	Q1
—	Société Nautique de la Marne	Paul Cocuet; Jules Demaré; Clément Dorlia; René Waleff	Unknown	France	DNF	

==== Semifinal 3 ====
Rank	Boat	Rowers	Coxswain	Nation	Time	Notes
1	Der Hamburger und Germania Ruder Club	Gustav Goßler; Oscar Goßler; Walther Katzenstein; Waldemar Tietgens	Carl Goßler	Germany	5:56.2	Q2
2	Cercle de l'Aviron Roubaix	Henri Bouckaert; Jean Cau; Émile Delchambre; Henri Hazebrouck	Charlot	France	5:59.0	Q1
3	Favorite Hammonia	Wilhelm Carstens; Julius Körner; Adolf Möller; Hugo Rüster	Gustav Moths	Germany	6:03.0	Q1
4	Club Nautique de Dieppe	Angot; Henri Delabarre; Robert Gelée; Maison	Unknown	France	6:20.0	

=== Finals ===
==== Final 1 ====
Rank	Boat	Rowers	Coxswain	Nation	Time
1st place, gold medalist(s)	Cercle de l'Aviron Roubaix	Henri Bouckaert; Jean Cau; Émile Delchambre; Henri Hazebrouck	Charlot	France	7:11.0
2nd place, silver medalist(s)	Club Nautique de Lyon	Georges Lumpp; Charles Perrin; Daniel Soubeyran; Émile Wegelin	Unknown	France	7:18.0
3rd place, bronze medalist(s)	Favorite Hammonia	Wilhelm Carstens; Julius Körner; Adolf Möller; Hugo Rüster	Max Ammermann	Germany	7:18.2

==== Final 2 ====
Rank	Boat	Rowers	Coxswain	Nation	Time
1st place, gold medalist(s)	Der Hamburger und Germania Ruder Club	Gustav Goßler; Oscar Goßler; Walther Katzenstein; Waldemar Tietgens	Carl Goßler	Germany	5:59.0
2nd place, silver medalist(s)	Minerva Amsterdam	Coenraad Hiebendaal; Geert Lotsij; Paul Lotsij; Johannes Terwogt	Hermanus Brockmann	Netherlands	6:03.0
3rd place, bronze medalist(s)	Ludwigshafener Ruderverein	Ernst Felle; Otto Fickeisen; Carl Lehle; Hermann Wilker	Franz Kröwerath	Germany	6:05.0

== Results summary ==
Rank	Boat	Rowers	Coxswain	Nation	Semifinals	Finals
1st place, gold medalist(s)	Der Hamburger und Germania Ruder Club	Gustav Goßler; Oscar Goßler; Walther Katzenstein; Waldemar Tietgens	Carl Goßler	Germany	5:56.2	5:59.0; Final 2
1st place, gold medalist(s)	Cercle de l'Aviron Roubaix	Henri Bouckaert; Jean Cau; Émile Delchambre; Henri Hazebrouck	Charlot	France	5:59.0	7:11.0; Final 1
2nd place, silver medalist(s)	Minerva Amsterdam	Coenraad Hiebendaal; Geert Lotsij; Paul Lotsij; Johannes Terwogt	Hermanus Brockmann	Netherlands	6:02.0	6:03.0; Final 2
2nd place, silver medalist(s)	Club Nautique de Lyon	Georges Lumpp; Charles Perrin; Daniel Soubeyran; Émile Wegelin	Unknown	France	6:06.2	7:18.0; Final 1
3rd place, bronze medalist(s)	Ludwigshafener Ruderverein	Ernst Felle; Otto Fickeisen; Carl Lehle; Hermann Wilker	Franz Kröwerath	Germany	6:14.0	6:05.0; Final 2
3rd place, bronze medalist(s)	Favorite Hammonia	Wilhelm Carstens; Julius Körner; Adolf Möller; Hugo Rüster	Gustav Moths (semis); Max Ammermann (final)	Germany	6:03.0	7:18.2; Final 1
7	Club Nautique de Dieppe	Angot; Henri Delabarre; Robert Gelée; Maison	Unknown	France	6:20.0	Did not advance
8	Royal Barcelona Maritime Club	Juan Camps; José Fórmica; Ricardo Margarit; Orestes Quintana	Antonio Vela	Spain	6:38.4	Did not advance
9	Club Nautique de France	René Beslaud; Léon Deslinières; Peyronnie; Saurel	Unknown	France	6:40.0	Did not advance
—	Société Nautique de la Marne	Paul Cocuet; Jules Demaré; Clément Dorlia; René Waleff	Unknown	France	DNF	Did not advance
