= Goßler =

Goßler is a surname. Notable people with the surname include:

- Anna Henriette Gossler (1771-1836), German banker, heiress and socialite
- Carl Goßler (1885–1914), German rower
- Cornelius Freiherr von Berenberg-Gossler (1874–1953), German banker
- Gustav Goßler (1879–1940), German rower
- Gustav von Goßler (1838–1902), German politician
- Heinrich von Gossler (1841–1927), Prussian general
- Hermann Goßler (1802–1877), German jurist and politician, mayor of Hamburg
- Johann Hinrich Gossler (1738-1790), German banker
- John von Berenberg-Gossler (1866-1943), German banker and politician
- Oskar Goßler (1875–1953), German rower
- Stefan Gossler (born 1955), German actor

== See also ==
- Gossler family
- Gossler Islands
- Gossler's Park
