= Spain at the 1900 Summer Olympics =

- IOC code: ESP
- NOC: Spanish Olympic Committee

in Paris
- Competitors: 8 in 3 sports
- Medals: Gold 1 Silver 0 Bronze 0 Total 1

Summer Olympics appearances (overview)
- 1900; 1904–1912; 1920; 1924; 1928; 1932; 1936; 1948; 1952; 1956; 1960; 1964; 1968; 1972; 1976; 1980; 1984; 1988; 1992; 1996; 2000; 2004; 2008; 2012; 2016; 2020; 2024

Spain competed at the modern Olympic Games for the first time at the 1900 Summer Olympics in Paris, France.

== Medalists ==
Gold medals were not given at the 1900 Games. A silver medal was given for first place, and a bronze medal was given for second. The International Olympic Committee has retroactively assigned gold, silver, and bronze medals to competitors who earned 1st, 2nd, and 3rd-place finishes, respectively, in order to bring early Olympics in line with current awards.

Pedro Pidal, 1st Marquess of Villaviciosa de Asturias got a silver medal in live pigeon shooting, but this event is not recognized by IOC as an official event as the winner was given a money award. Nevertheless, the Spanish Olympic Committee does recognize the medal.

=== Gold ===
- José de Amézola y Aspizúa and Francisco Villota — Basque pelota

== Results by event ==
=== Basque pelota ===
Spain's first Olympic appearance included a two-man team in pelota. There were only two teams registered for the tournament, however the French duo were unable to attend the game. The French team thus lost by forfeit, and Spain won the gold medal.

Team	Event	Final	Rank
Team	Event	Opposition Result	Rank
José de Amézola y Aspizúa; Francisco Villota	Two-men team	Maurice Durquetty/Etchegaray (FRA); W	1st place, gold medalist(s)

=== Equestrian ===
Spain had one equestrian compete in 1900; his place in the mail coach event is unknown except that he was not in the top 4.

Equestrian	Event	Result	Rank
Luis Antonio de Guadalmina	Mail coach	Unknown	5–51

=== Fencing ===
Spain appeared in fencing in the nation's debut appearance.

Fencer	Event	Round 1		Quarterfinals		Repechage		Semifinals		Final	
Fencer	Event	Result	Rank	Result	Rank	Result	Rank	Result	Rank	Result	Rank
Mauricio Ponce de Léon	Men's foil	Advanced		Not advanced		did not advance					
Mauricio Ponce de Léon	Men's épée	Unknown	3–6	did not advance		—		did not advance			
Mauricio Ponce de Léon	Men's sabre	Unknown	1–4 Q	—				Unknown	5–8	did not advance	

=== Rowing ===
Spain sent a coxed fours boat and a single sculler to compete in the rowing events.

Boat	Event	Round 1		Semifinals		Final	
Boat	Event	Result	Rank	Result	Rank	Result	Rank
Antonio Vela	Men's single sculls	DNF	—	did not advance			
Réal Club Barcelona: Juan Camps Mas; José Fórmica Corsi; Ricardo Margarit Calvet; Orestes Quintana; Antonio Vela (cox)	Men's coxed four	—		6:38.4	2	did not advance	
