= Ruder =

Surname

Ruder is a surname. Notable people with the surname include:

- David Sturtevant Ruder (1929–2020), the William W. Gurley Memorial Professor of Law Emeritus at Northwestern University School of Law
- Emil Ruder (1914–1970), Swiss typographer, graphic designer, co-founder of the Basel School of Design
- Gardy Ruder (born 1954), German author and teacher who is now based in Baden-Württemberg
- Henryk Ruder, Polish engineer
- William Ruder, American public relations executive and co-founder of Ruder Finn with David Finn

== See also ==
- Der Hamburger und Germania Ruder Club, rowing club in Hamburg, Germany
- Ruđer Bošković Institute – Croatian research institute
- Ruder Than You, American ska band that was founded in 1989 at Penn State University
