= Rudes (surname) =

Rudes is a surname. Notable people with the surname include:

- Aleksandra Rudes (born 1930), Soviet mezzo-soprano opera singer
- Blair A. Rudes (1951–2008), American linguist
- Jeffrey Rudes (fl. 2008), American businessman

== See also ==
- Rude (surname)
- Ruder
