= Lotsij =

Lotsij is a surname. Notable people with the surname include:

- Dirk Lotsij (1882–1965), Dutch footballer and Olympian
- Geert Lotsij (1878–1959), Dutch rower and Olympian
- Paul Lotsij (1880–1910), Dutch rower and Olympian
