= Deslinières =

Deslinières is a French surname. Notable people with the surname include:

- Léon Deslinières (fl. late 19th century), French rower and Olympian
- Lucien Deslinières (1857–1937), French journalist, writer and socialist
