= Jean Cau =

Jean Cau may refer to:

- Jean Cau (writer) (1925–1993), French writer and journalist
- Jean Cau (rower) (1874–1921), French Olympic rower
