= Lumpp =

Lumpp is a surname. Notable people with the surname include:

- Georges Lumpp (1874–1934), French rower and Olympian
- Ray Lumpp (1923–2015), American basketball player
