= René Beslaud =

French rower

Personal information
- Nationality: French

Sport
- Sport: Rowing

René Beslaud was a French rower. He competed in the men's coxed four event at the 1900 Summer Olympics.
