= Robert Gelée =

French rower

Personal information
- Full name: Robert Prosper Georges Gelée
- Born: 7 February 1880; Dieppe, France
- Died: 26 March 1951 (aged 71); Dieppe, France

Sport
- Sport: Rowing

Robert Prosper Georges Gelée (7 February 1880 – 26 March 1951) was a French rower. He competed in two events at the 1900 Summer Olympics.
