= Clément Dorlia =

French rower (1870–1941)

Personal information
- Full name: Albert Émile Clément Dorlia
- Born: 7 December 1870; Paris, France
- Died: 23 January 1942 (aged 71); Paris, German-occupied France

Sport
- Sport: Rowing

Albert Émile Clément Dorlia (7 December 1870 – 23 January 1942) was a French rower. He competed in two events at the 1900 Summer Olympics.
