= Henri Delabarre =

French rower

Personal information
- Nationality: French

Sport
- Sport: Rowing

Henri Delabarre was a French rower. He competed in two events at the 1900 Summer Olympics.
