= Max Schöne =

German swimmer

Personal information
- Born: January 20, 1880 Berlin, German Empire
- Died: January 16, 1961 (aged 80)

Sport
- Sport: Swimming
Medal record
Representing Germany
Olympic Games
| Gold medal – first place | 1900 Paris | 200 m team |

Max Schöne (January 20, 1880 – January 16, 1961) was a German swimmer who competed in the 1900 Summer Olympics. He was born in Berlin. As a member of the German swimming team he won the gold medal at the Paris 1900 edition.
