= Georges Lumpp =

French rower (1874–1934)

Olympic medal record

Men's rowing

Representing France
Silver medal – second place	1900 Paris	Coxed four

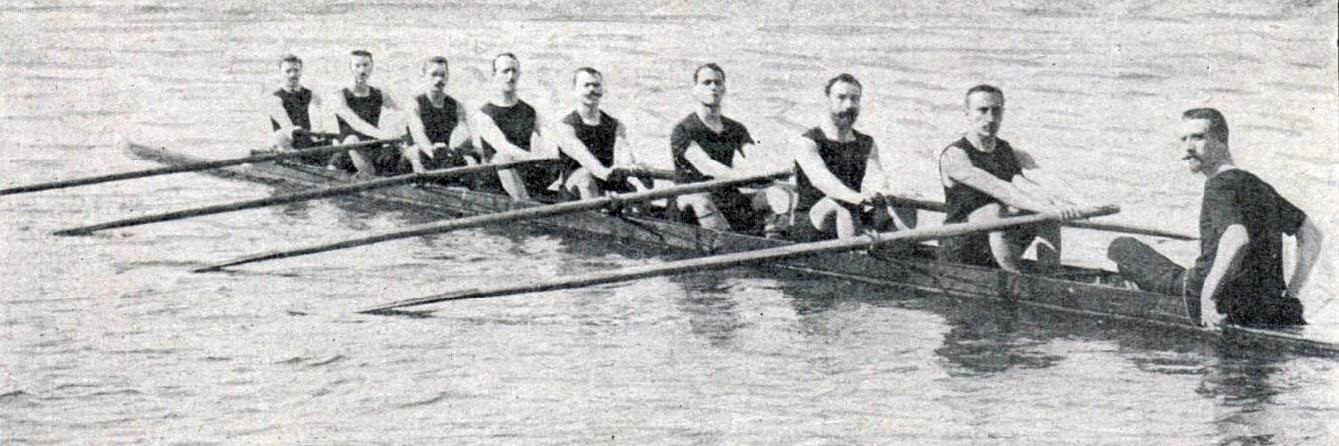
Lump is the 3rd from right

Georges Joseph Lumpp (18 September 1874 in La Guiche – 1 October 1934 in Collonges-au-Mont-d'Or) was a French rower who competed in the 1900 Summer Olympics. He was part of the French boat Club Nautique de Lyon, which won the silver medal in the coxed four with Charles Perrin, Daniel Soubeyran, Émile Wegelin .
