= Orestes Quintana =

Spanish rower

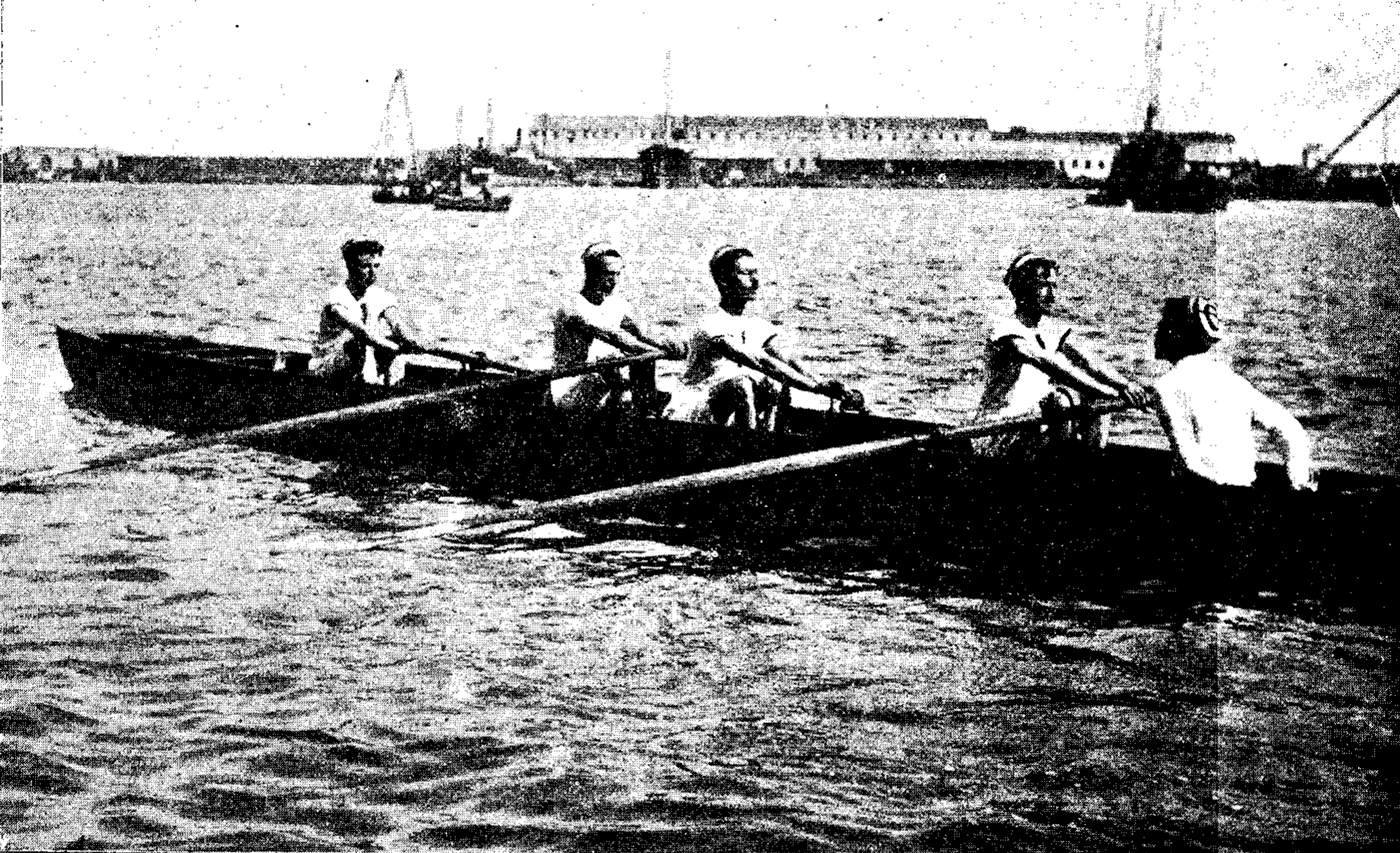
- The Spanish rowing team in 1901

Personal information
- Full name: Orestes Demóstenes Homero Quintana y Vigo
- Nationality: Spanish
- Born: 1880 Barcelona, Spain
- Died: 4 April 1909 (aged 28–29) Barcelona, Spain

Sport
- Sport: Rowing

Orestes Demóstenes Homero Quintana y Vigo (1880 – 4 April 1909) was a Spanish rower. He competed in the men's coxed four event at the 1900 Summer Olympics.
