= Aleksandra Rudes =

Soviet opera singer

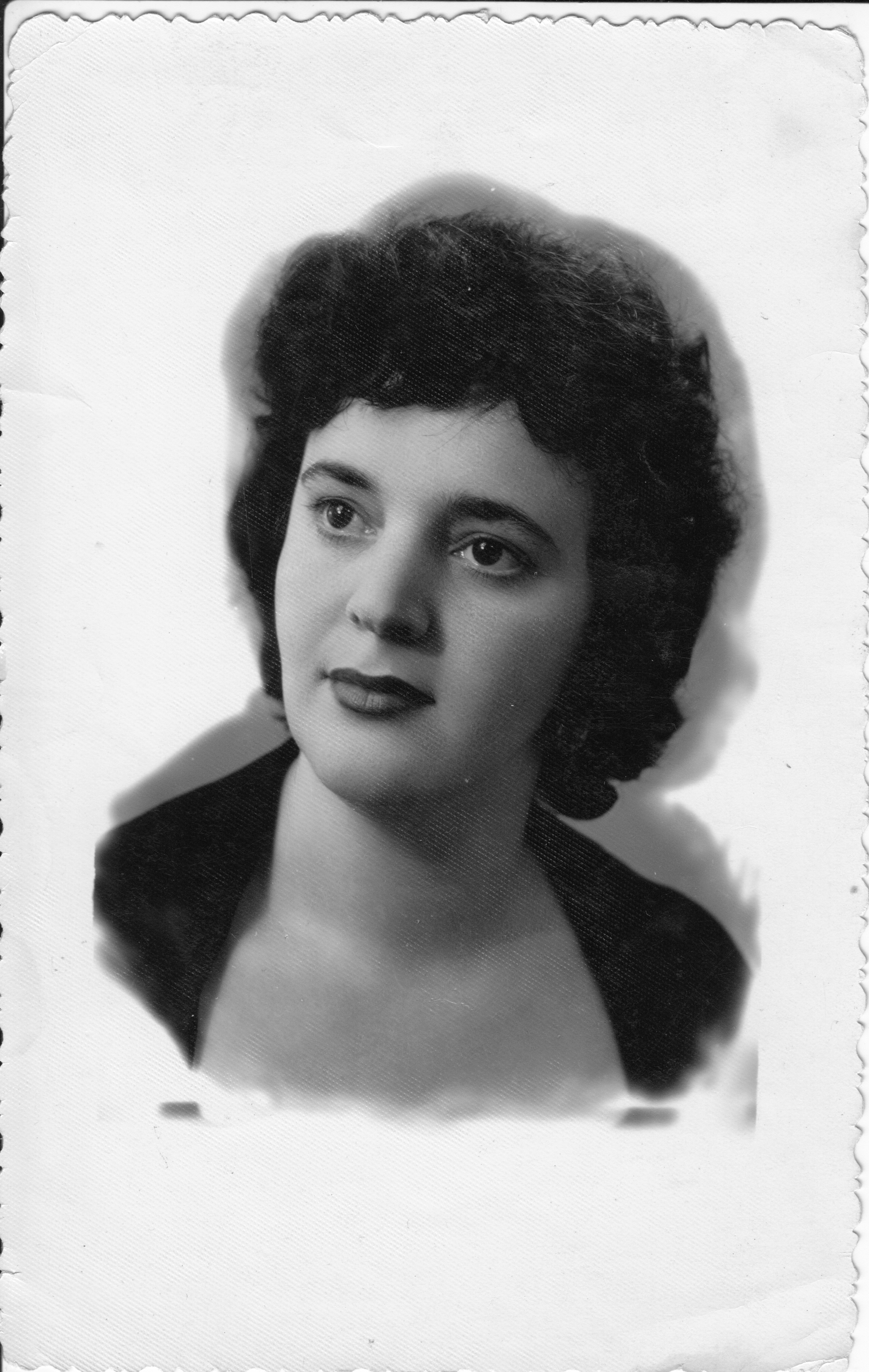
- Born: 10 July 1930 (age 96); Odesa, Ukrainian Soviet Socialist Republic, USSR
- Awards: People's Artist of the RSFSR Merited Artist of the RSFSR

Aleksandra Davidovna Rudes (Russian: Александра Давыдовна Рудес) (born 10 July 1930) is a Soviet mezzo-soprano opera singer and recipient of the Merited Artist of the RSFSR and People's Artist of the RSFSR awards.

== Biography ==
Rudes was born in the city of Odesa. During Siege of Odessa, she and her family were evacuated from the city until their eventual return after the war. After graduating from the Odesa Conservatory (today called the Odesa National Music Academy) in 1962, she performed for the Moldova National Opera Ballet theater. In 1963 she joined the Saratov Opera and Ballet Theater, where she performed for over 20 years and received the Merited Artist of the RSFSR award in 1969 and the People's Artist of the RSFSR award in 1978. She has been described as a legendary name, whose voice gave goosebumps to those who heard her performances.

She currently resides in New York City.
