= Ricardo Margarit =

Spanish rower

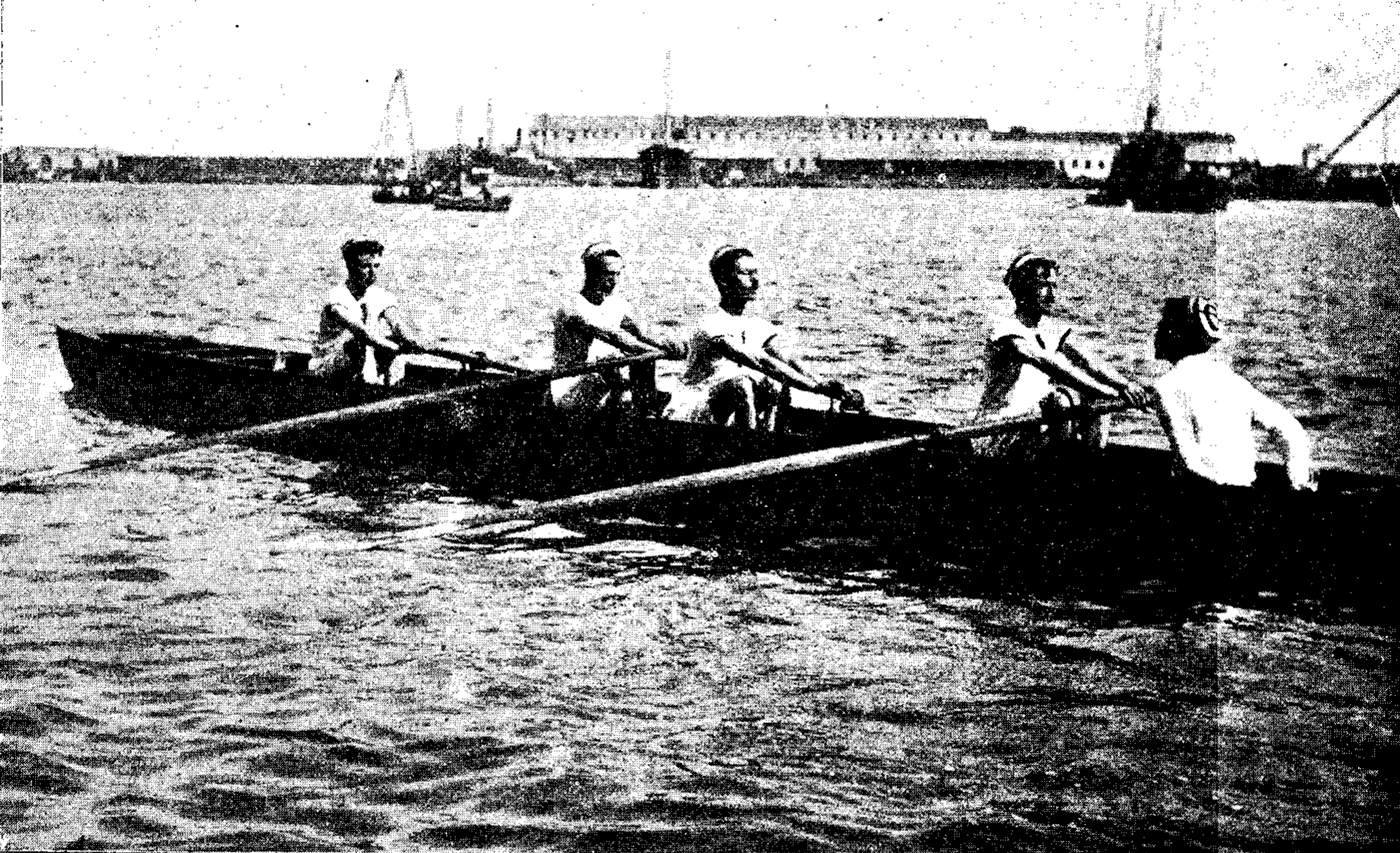
- The Spanish rowing team in 1901

Personal information
- Full name: Ricardo Margarit Calvet
- Born: 8 December 1884 Rubí, Spain
- Died: 30 December 1974 (aged 90) Barcelona, Spain

Sport
- Sport: Rowing

Ricardo Margarit Calvet (8 December 1884 – 30 December 1974) was a Spanish rower. He competed in the men's coxed four event at the 1900 Summer Olympics.
