= Alois Bierl =

German rower (born 1943)

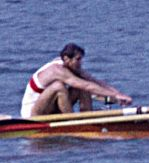
- Bierl at the 1971 European Championships

Personal information
- Born: 8 September 1943 (age 82) Waldmünchen, Germany
- Height: 192 cm (6 ft 4 in)
- Weight: 95 kg (209 lb)

Sport
- Sport: Rowing
- Club: Ludwigshafener Ruderverein
Medal record
Men's rowing
Representing West Germany
Olympic Games
Gold medal – first place	1972 Munich	Coxed four
World Championships
Gold medal – first place	1970 St. Catharines	Coxed four
European Championships
Gold medal – first place	1969 Klagenfurt	Coxed four
Gold medal – first place	1971 Copenhagen	Coxed four
Bronze medal – third place	1973 Moscow	Coxless pair

Alois Bierl (born 8 September 1943) is a German rower who competed for West Germany in the 1972 Summer Olympics.

He was born in Waldmünchen and member of the Ludwigshafener Ruderverein. He competed at the 1970 World Rowing Championships in St. Catharines in the coxed four and won gold. He competed at the 1971 European Rowing Championships and won a gold medal with the coxed four. In 1972 he was a crew member of the West German boat which won the gold medal in the coxed four event.
