= Juan Camps =

Spanish rower

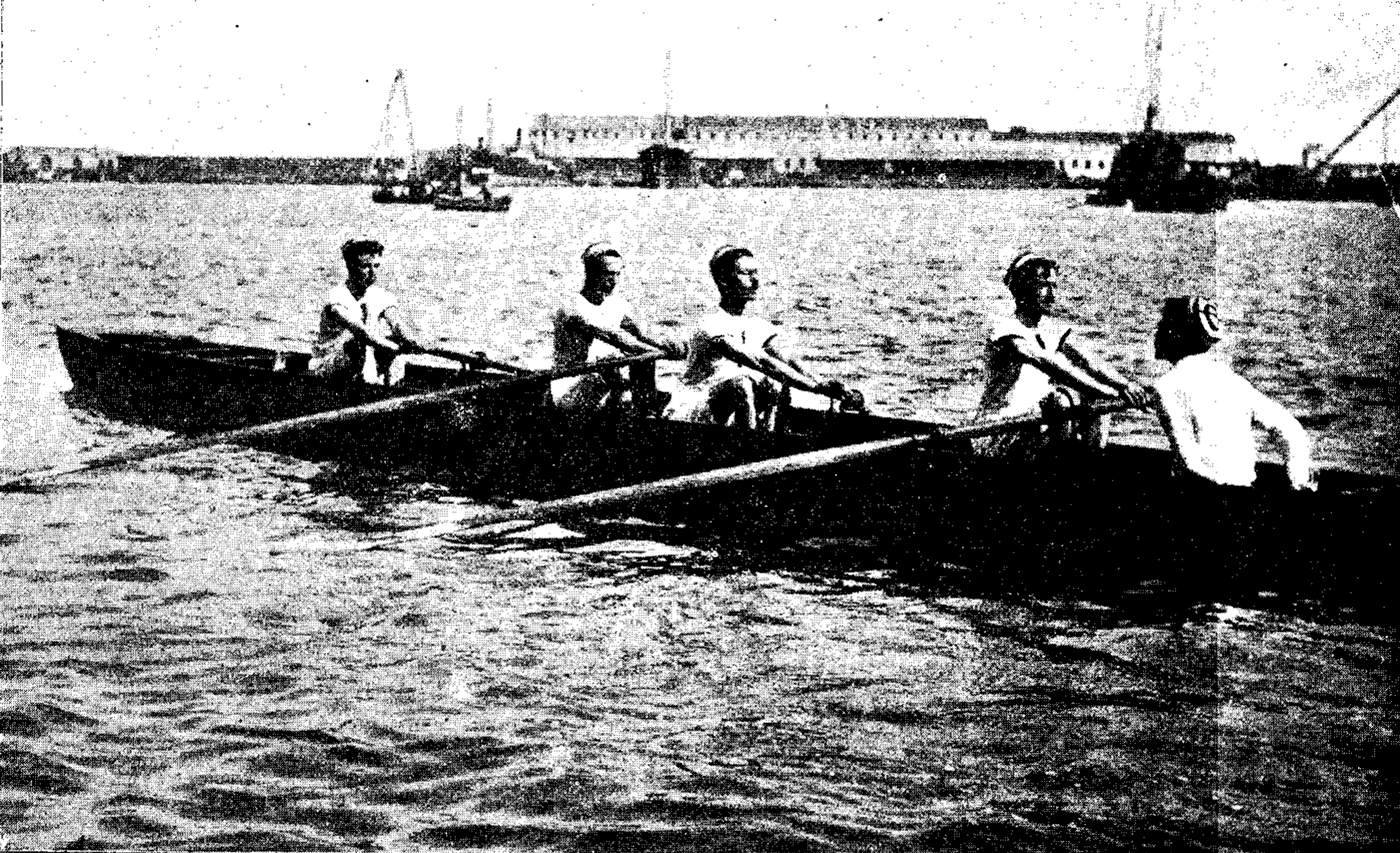
- The Spanish rowing team in 1901

Personal information
- Full name: Juan Camps Mas
- Born: 1883 Barcelona, Spain
- Died: 21 April 1921 (aged 37–38) Barcelona, Spain

Sport
- Sport: Rowing

Juan Camps Mas (1883 – 21 April 1921) was a Spanish rower. He competed in the men's coxed four event at the 1900 Summer Olympics.
