= José Fórmica =

Spanish rower (1881–1954)

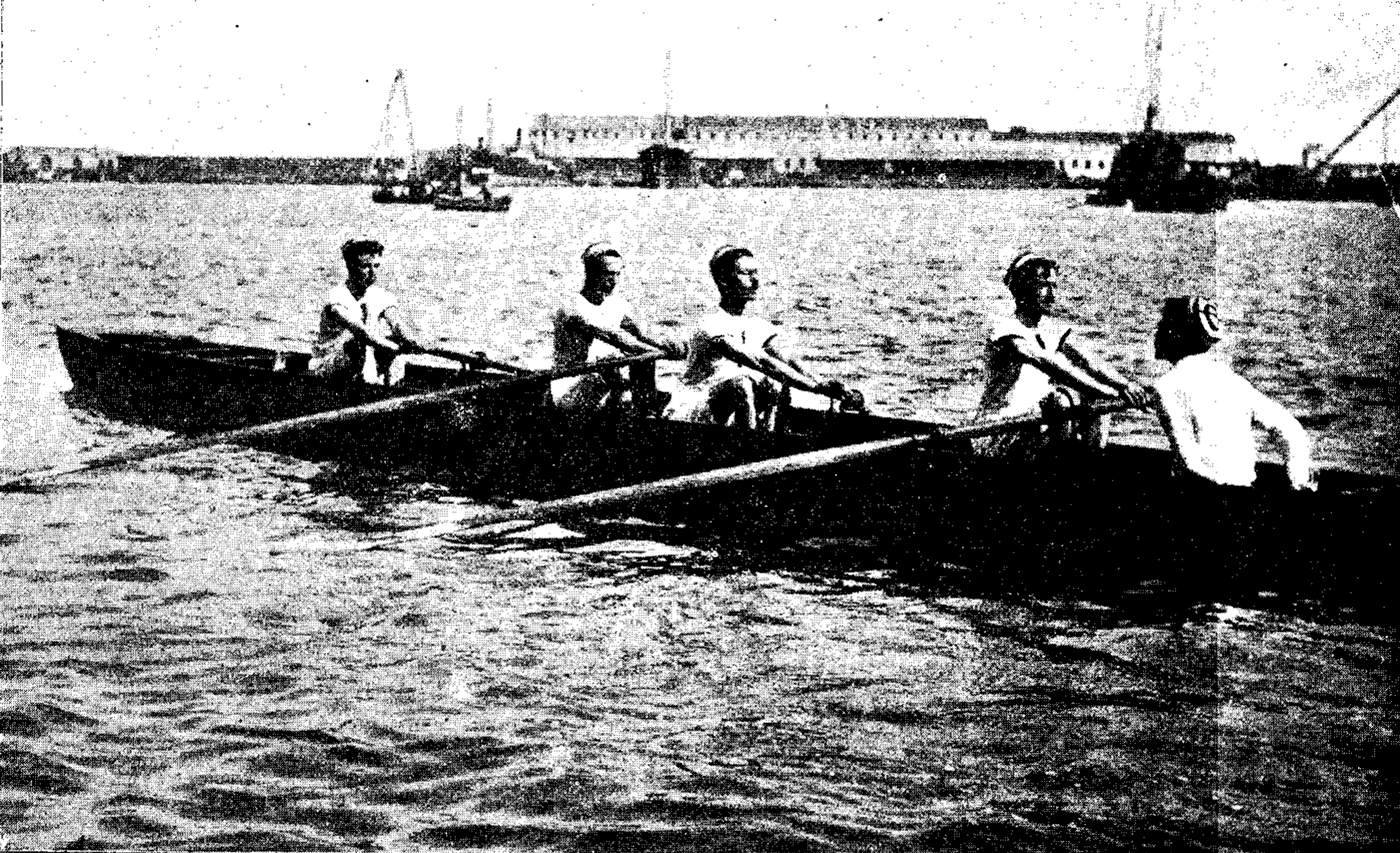
- The Spanish rowing team in 1901

Personal information
- Full name: José Fórmica-Corsi Cuevas
- Born: 11 April 1881 Barcelona, Spain
- Died: 5 November 1954 (aged 73) Barcelona, Spain

Sport
- Sport: Rowing

José Fórmica-Corsi Cuevas (11 April 1881 – 5 November 1954) was a Spanish rower. He competed in the men's coxed four event at the 1900 Summer Olympics.
