= Paul Söllner =

German rower

Personal information
- Born: 5 June 1911 Davos, Switzerland
- Died: 8 April 1994 (aged 82) Murnau am Staffelsee, Germany

Sport
- Sport: Rowing
- Club: Ludwigshafener RV
Medal record
Men's rowing
Representing Nazi Germany
Olympic Games
Gold medal – first place	1936 Berlin	Coxed four

Paul Söllner (5 June 1911 – 8 April 1994) was a German rower who competed in the 1936 Summer Olympics.

He was born in Davos and died in Murnau am Staffelsee. In 1936 he won the gold medal as member of the German boat in the coxed four competition. He was member of the Ludwigshafener Ruderverein.
