= Gardy Ruder =

German author and teacher (born 1954)

Gardy-Kate Ruder (born 1954 in Lahr in the Black Forest of Germany) is a German author and teacher who is now based in Baden-Württemberg. She writes about the victims of the Nazis.

She originally worked as a teacher in primary and secondary schools.

She integrated the story of her grandmother Katharina, who was killed in the extermination camp in Grafeneck, into her own biography.

This book, Katharina Ketterer - victim of "euthanasia", has changed her life.

Since 1999 she has written for local newspapers. In 2003, she realized in Lahr the project "Stolpersteine" of the artist Gunter Demnig, who lives in Koeln, in her own birth town and in the one of her grandmother Katharina. Writing gave her the possibility to clear up structures of ignoring German History, finding a form to accept what really happened.
