= Antonio Vela =

Spanish rower

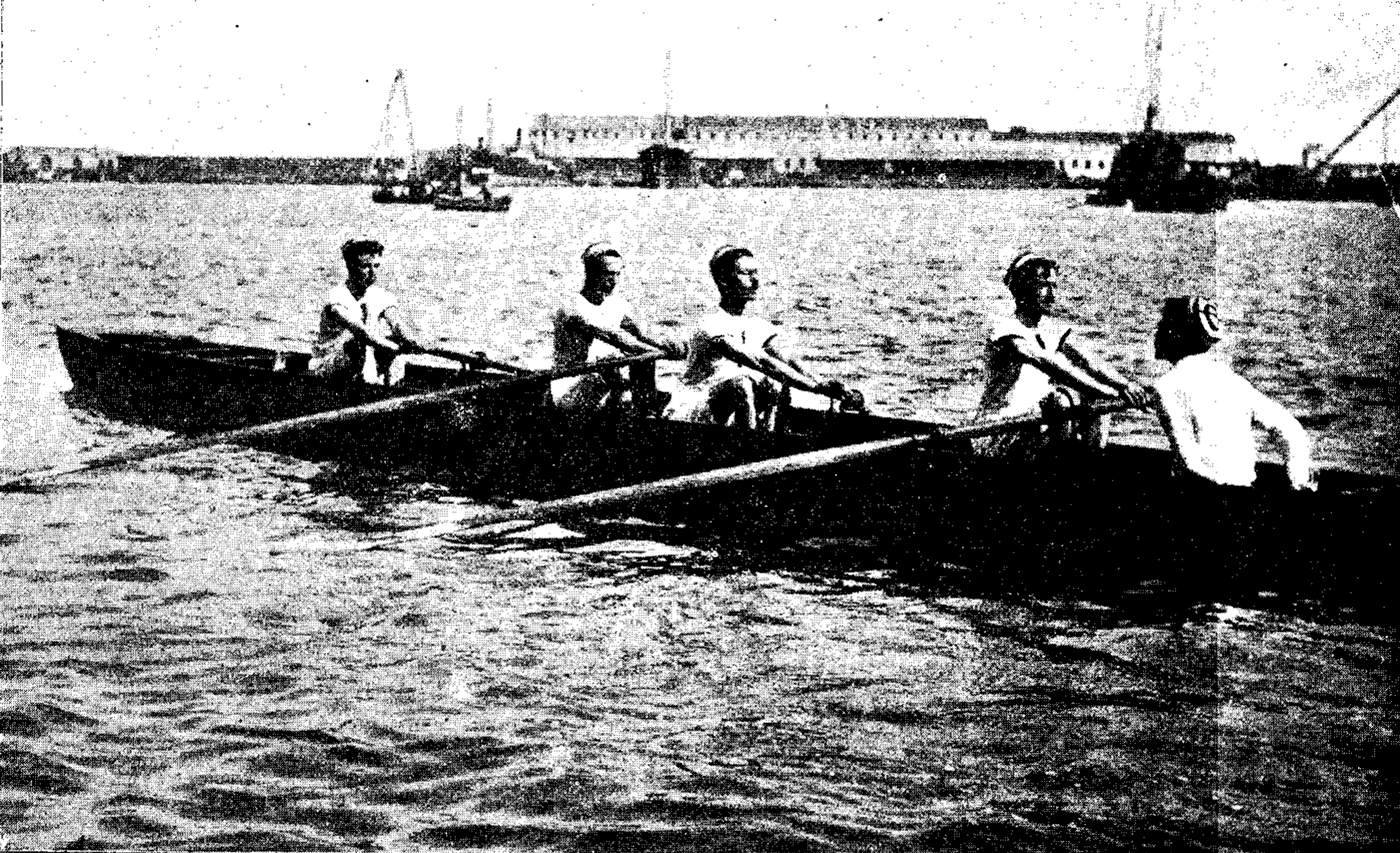
- The Spanish rowing team in 1901

Personal information
- Full name: Antonio Vela Vivó
- Born: 20 March 1872 Mahón, Spain
- Died: 20 January 1950 (aged 77) Barcelona, Spain

Sport
- Sport: Rowing

Antonio Vela Vivó (20 March 1872 – 20 January 1950) was a Spanish rower. He competed in two events at the 1900 Summer Olympics.
