= Henryk Ruder =

Polish engineer

Henryk Ruder was a Polish engineer, a long-time head and member of Warsaw-based Road Network Planning Bureau and member of the board of the Autostrady Polskie think-tank. A specialist in road and motorway network development, he co-authored the plan of the Polish motorways network, most notably the location of A1, A2 and A4. He authored numerous works on road construction and development. In 1998, Ruder was posthumously awarded the Officer's Cross of the Order of Polonia Restituta for his services to road construction.
