= Ludwigshafener Ruderverein =

- Ludwigshafener Ruderverein von 1878 e.V.
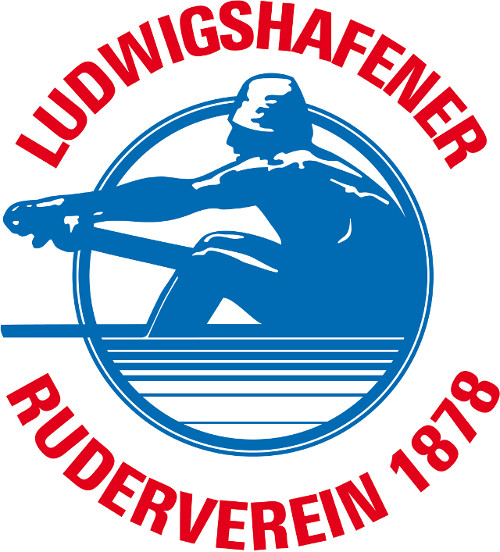
- Location: Ludwigshafen am Rhein
- Home water: Luitpoldhafen (Ludwigshafen)
- Founded: August 1, 1878
- Key people: Winfried Ringwald (President)
- Affiliations: 289 (as of January 01,2013)
- Website: www.ludwigshafener-rv.de

The Ludwigshafener Ruderverein von 1878 is the only rowing club in Ludwigshafen am Rhein, Germany and also one of the oldest sports clubs of the city. It was founded in 1878 in Ludwigshafen and at the beginning of 2013 the rowing club had 289 members. The Ludwigshafener Ruderverein is a member of the national rowing association of Rhineland-Palatinate and is also in the German rowing association.

== History ==
=== Early years: 1878–2000 ===
The Ludwigshafener Ruderverein was founded on August 1, 1878. During the first meeting, the 16 founding members elected C. H. Andersen to be the first chairman of the club. Andersen was also the person who, as a former member the Allgemeiner Alster club in Hamburg, played a vital role in pushing forward the club's status.

In the early years, the number of members rose and in 1898 the boathouse in Ludwigshafen was opened. At the second olympic games in Paris in 1900 the coxed four of Ludwigshafen won the bronze medal. Twelve years later in 1912 Hermann Wilker, Otto Fickeisen, Rudolf Fickeisen, Albert Arnheiter and cox Otto Maier won the gold medal at the olympic games in Stockholm. World War I stopped the development of the rowing club and the club was resumed in 1921.

In 1936 Paul Söllner won the next gold medal in the coxed four in co-operation with rowers from the rowing club of Mannheim. During World War II, 57 members of the club were lost and the boathouse was destroyed completely by air attacks on the city of Ludwigshafen and the chemical plants in Ludwigshafen.

After the war the Ludwigshafener Ruderverein was the first refounded rowing club in the French occupation zone. The boathouse had to be rebuilt and in 1947 the first win on a national regatta was announced.

In 1972 Alois Bierl won the gold medal at the olympic games in Munich in the coxed four alongside Winfried Ringwald who received fifth place with the German eight.

Later in the nineties, the women's rowing groups were very successful. Beate Brühe together with Andrea Klapeck received fourth place at the world championships 1991 in the quadruple four race. Three years later Andrea Klapeck became world champion in the eight and was also member of the German rowing crew for the olympic games in 1996 in Atlanta. In the women's lightweights division, Karin Stephan achieved at the worldchampionsships in 1998 the silver medal and in 2000 the gold medal.

=== 2000–present ===
In the years 2000 to 2005 Sandra Schnitzer, Anja Hannöver and Martin and Jochen Kühner were the most successful athletes in national and international competitions. In the recent past the rowing club of Ludwigshafen focused on training and education of young rowers and was able to send respectively one young athlete to the World Rowing Junior Championships in 2010 and 2011.

In the years 2009 and 2010 the Ludwigshafener Ruderverein provided in co-operation with the Mannheimer Ruderclub an eight for the German premier league of rowing.

Furthermore the club was very successful in the masters division. In the last years Detlev Jantz and Jürgen Hock won many titles at the FISA World Rowing Masters and crews from the Ludwigshafener Ruderverein achieved one victory in 2012 and good positions in subsequent years at the longest non-stop rowing competition in the world, the Tour du Lac Léman.

== Location ==
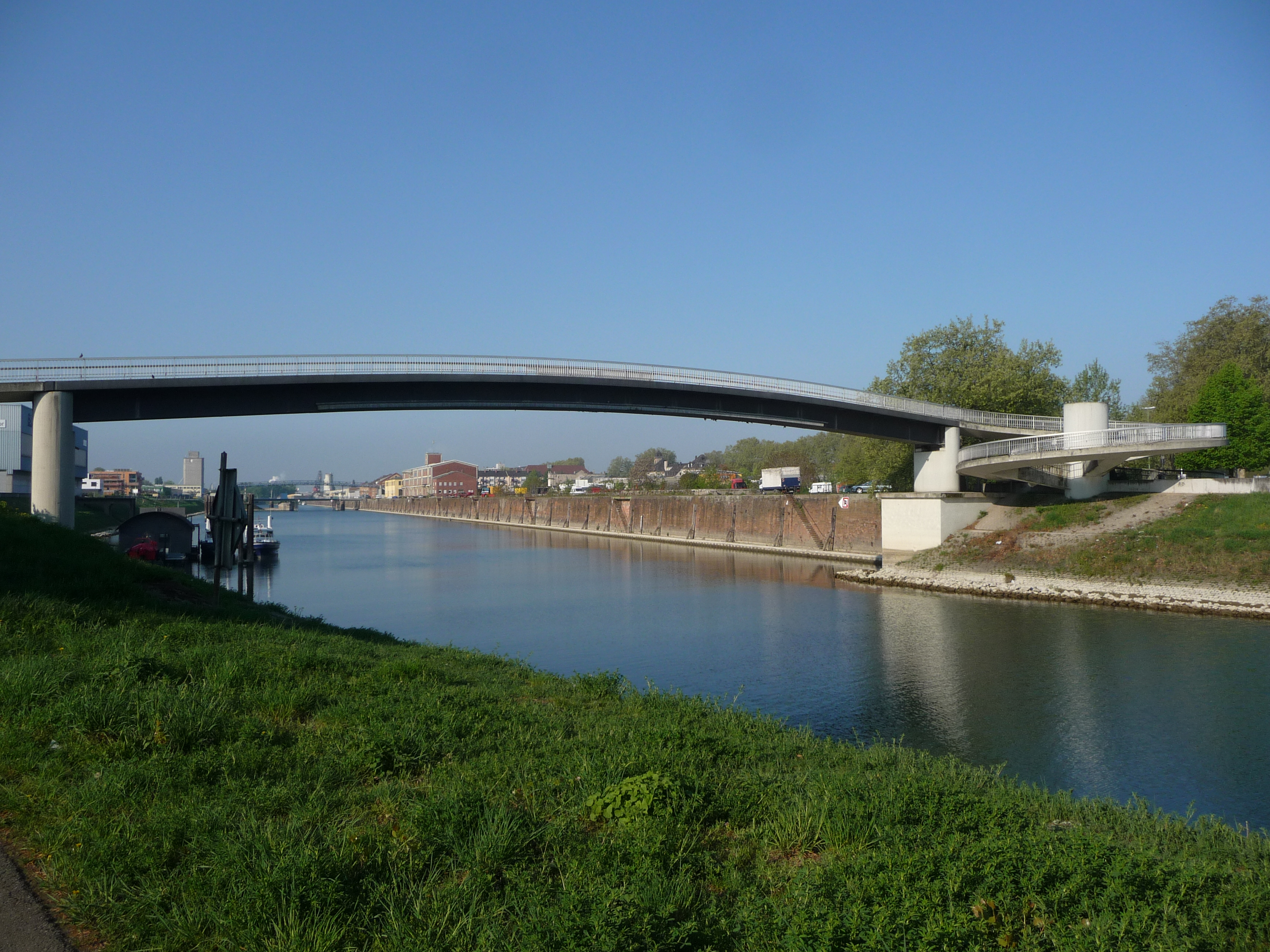
The harbor "Luitpoldhafen" in Ludwigshafen

The boathouse of the Ludwigshafener Ruderverein is located in the center of Ludwigshafen beside the river Rhine. The nearby located harbor "Luitpoldhafen" is used for training beginners and work out.

Since April 2006 inside of the boathouse resides the Italian restaurant “Ristorante Della Bona” and after the reconstruction of the building in 2007 and 2008, there is an information area in the upper floor for the arising district “Rheinufer Süd” around the club.

An ample area near Altrip also belongs to the club. It is used especially for training beginners and for leisure activities within the club.

== Honours ==
=== Olympic Games ===
Year	Scene	Result	Discipline	Crew
1900	Paris	Bronze	Coxed four	Otto Fickeisen, Hermann Wilker, Ernst Felle, Carl Lehle and cox Franz Kröwerath
1912	Stockholm	Gold	Coxed four	Otto Fickeisen, Hermann Wilker, Rudolf Fickeisen, Albert Arnheiter and cox Otto Maier (Frankfurter Ruderverein)
1932	Los Angeles		Alternate	Hans Gelbert
1936	Berlin	Gold	Coxed four	Paul Söllner in cooperation with Walter Volle, Ernst Gaber, Hans Maier and cox Fritz Bauer from Mannheimer Ruderverein Amicitia
1968	Mexiko		Alternate	Alois Bierl
1972	München	Gold	Coxed four	Alois Bierl in cooperation with RV Neptun Konstanz/RG Wetzlar/Ulmer RC Donau
1972	München	5.	Eight	Winfried Ringwald
1976	Montreal	8.	Coxed pair	Winfried Ringwald
1996	Atlanta		Alternate	Andrea Klapheck

=== World Rowing Championships ===
Year	Scene	Result	Discipline	Crew
1970	St. Catharines	Gold	Coxed four	Alois Bierl
1977	Amsterdam	Bronze	Eight	Winfried Ringwald
1978	Karapiro	Silver	Eight	Winfried Ringwald
1988	Mailand	Silver	Double scull	Roland Ehrenfels, Hartmut Schäfer (Kölner RV 1877)
1993	Roudnice	Bronze	Women Eight	Andrea Klapheck
1994	Indianapolis	Gold	Women Eight	Andrea Klapheck
1998	Köln	Silver	Lightweight Women's Double scull	Karin Stephan, Claudia Blasberg (Dresdner RV)
2000	Zagreb	Gold	Lightweight Women's Quad scull	Karin Stephan
