= Ottokar Weise =

German sailor

Personal information
- Nationality: German

Sailing career
- Sport: Sailing
- Club: Berliner Yacht-Club
- Class(es): 1 to 2 ton Open class
Medal record
Sailing
Representing Germany
Olympic Games
Silver medal – second place	1900 Paris	Open class
Gold medal – first place	1900 Paris	1 to 2 ton 2nd race

Ottokar Weise was a German sailor who competed in the 1900 Summer Olympics.

He was the crew on the German boat Aschenbrödel, which won the gold medal in the second race of 1 to 2 ton class and silver medal in the open class.
