= Gustav-Adolf Moths =

German rower

Olympic medal record

Men's rowing

Representing Germany
| Bronze medal – third place | 1900 Paris | Coxed four A |

Gustav-Adolf Moths (born 21 September 1877 in Hamburg, date of death unknown) was a German rower who competed in the 1900 Summer Olympics. He was the coxswain with the German crew in the coxed four A semi-final, but he did not compete in the final. However the IOC medal database credits the bronze medal to him and not to Max Ammermann, who participated in the final.
