= Paul Wiesner =

German sailor

Personal information
- Born: 10 September 1855 Nowa Sól, Kingdom of Prussia, German Confederation
- Died: 1 October 1930 (aged 75) Berlin, Germany

Sailing career
- Sport: Sailing
- Club: Berliner Yacht-Club
- Class(es): 0.5 to 1 ton 1 to 2 ton Open class
Medal record
Sailing
Representing Germany
Olympic Games
Silver medal – second place	1900 Paris	Open class
Gold medal – first place	1900 Paris	1 to 2 ton 2nd race

Paul Wiesner (10 September 1855 – 1 October 1930) was a German sailor who competed in the 1900 Summer Olympics.

He was the helmsman of the German boat Aschenbrödel, which won the gold medal in the second race of 1 – 2 ton class and silver medal in the open class. He also participated in the ½—1 ton class, but his boat Aschenbrödel weighed in at 1.041 tons instead of less than a 1 ton, and he was disqualified.
