= Henri Bouckaert =

French rower

Medal record

Men's rowing

Representing France

Olympic Games
Gold medal – first place	1900 Paris	Coxed four

Jules Henri Bouckaert (3 May 1870 – 29 April 1912) was a French competition rower and Olympic champion. He was born in Roncq and died in İzmir. Bouckaert won a gold medal in the coxed four event at the 1900 Summer Olympics, as member of the French team Cercle de l'Aviron Roubaix.
