= Émile Delchambre =

French rower

Olympic medal record

Men's rowing

Representing France
Gold medal – first place	1900 Paris	Coxed four

Émile Henri Delchambre (3 December 1875 in Roubaix – 8 September 1958 in Roubaix) was a French rower who competed in the 1900 Summer Olympics.

He was part of the French boat Cercle de l'Aviron Roubaix, which won the gold medal in the coxed fours.
