= Charlot (rowing) =

French rower

Medal record

Men's rowing

Representing France

Olympic Games
Gold medal – first place	1900 Paris	Coxed four

Charlot was a French coxswain and Olympic champion.

Charlot won a gold medal in coxed fours at the 1900 Summer Olympics, as coxswain for the French team Cercle de l'Aviron Roubaix.
