= Johannes Terwogt =

Dutch olympic rower (1878–1977)

Olympic medal record

Men's rowing
Silver medal – second place	1900 Paris	Coxed four B

Johannes Hester Lambertus Terwogt (18 May 1878 in Oude Wetering – 22 January 1977 in Amsterdam) was a Dutch rower who competed in the 1900 Summer Olympics.

He was part of the Dutch boat Minerva Amsterdam, which won the silver medal in the coxed fours final B.
