= Hermanus Brockmann =

Dutch rower (1871–1936)

Olympic medal record

Men's rowing

Representing the Netherlands
Gold medal – first place	1900 Paris	Coxed pair
Silver medal – second place	1900 Paris	Coxed four
Bronze medal – third place	1900 Paris	Eight

Hermanus Gerardus "Herman" Brockmann (14 June 1871 in Amsterdam – 18 January 1936 in The Hague) was a Dutch coxswain who competed in the 1900 Summer Olympics.

He was part of the Dutch boats Minerva Amsterdam, which won the gold medal in the coxed pairs, the silver medal in the coxed fours and the bronze medal in the eights. He also competed in the semi-final of the coxed pairs competition. However, his 60 kg weight was seen as a considerable disadvantage and he was replaced by an unknown local boy of 33 kg. The crew went on to win the final narrowly beating the French team. Despite not racing the final Brockmann is considered a gold medalist by the IOC and is listed in their medal database.
