= Waldemar Tietgens =

German rower

Personal information
- Full name: Oscar Waldemar Tietgens
- Born: 26 March 1879 Hamburg, German Empire
- Died: 28 July 1917 (aged 38) Langemark-Poelkapelle, Belgium

Sport
- Country: Germany
- Sport: Rowing

Achievements and titles
- Olympicfinals: 1900 Olympics – Gold
Medal record
Men's rowing
Representing Germany
Olympic Games
| Gold medal – first place | 1900 Paris | Coxed four B |

Oscar Waldemar Tietgens (26 March 1879 – 28 July 1917) was a German rower who competed in the 1900 Summer Olympics. He was part of the German boat Germania Ruder Club, Hamburg, which won the gold medal in the coxed fours final B.

He was killed in action during World War I while serving as a Leutnant der Reserve in the 49th Reserve Field Artillery Regiment. He is buried at the Hooglede German war cemetery in Hooglede, West Flanders, Belgium (grave 5305).

== See also ==
- List of Olympians killed in World War I
