= Henri Hazebrouck =

French rower

Olympic medal record

Men's rowing

Representing France
Gold medal – first place	1900 Paris	Coxed four

Henri Alphonse Hazebrouck (21 July 1877 in Roubaix – 1 December 1948 in Roubaix) was a French rower who competed in the 1900 Summer Olympics. He was part of the French boat Cercle de l'Aviron Roubaix, which won the gold medal in the coxed fours.
