= René Waleff =

French rower (1874–1961)

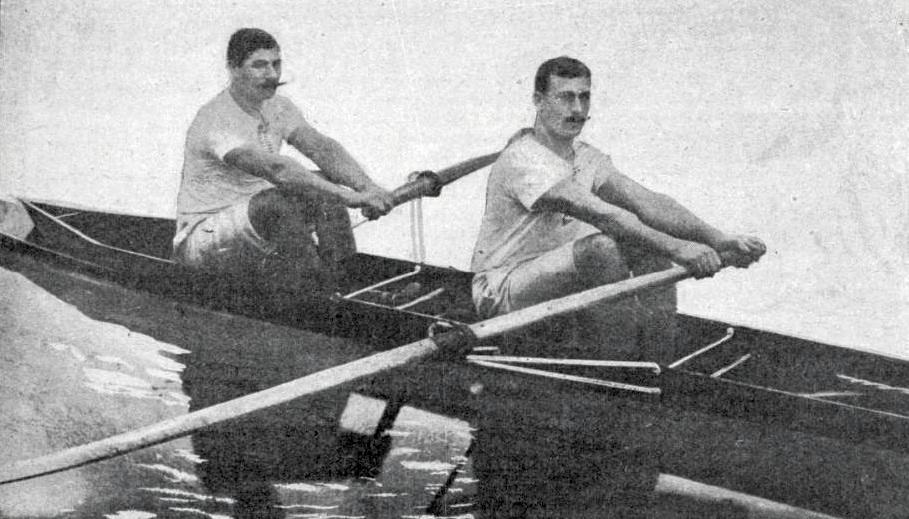
- René Waleff (right) 1899.

Personal information
- Born: Maxime René Waleff; 30 November 1874 Geneva, Switzerland
- Died: 31 March 1961 (aged 86) Jouarre, France

Sport
- Sport: Rowing
- Club: Société Nautique de la Marne
Medal record
Men's rowing
Representing France
Olympic Games
Silver medal – second place	1900 Paris	Coxed pair
European Rowing Championships
Gold medal – first place	1900 Paris	Coxed pair

Maxime René Waleff (30 November 1874 – 31 March 1961) was a French rower who as a member of the French club Société Nautique de la Marne and his team won the silver medal in the coxed pair in the 1900 Summer Olympics.
