= Coenraad Hiebendaal =

Dutch rower

Olympic medal record

Men's rowing
Silver medal – second place	1900 Paris	Coxed four B

Coenraad Christiaan Hiebendaal (10 April 1879 in Gorinchem – 3 June 1921 in Amsterdam) was a Dutch rower who competed in the 1900 Summer Olympics. He was part of the Dutch boat Minerva Amsterdam, which won the silver medal in the coxed fours final B. Coenraad Hiebendaal studied at the University of Amsterdam. Later in his life he became a physician.
