= Jean Cau (rower) =

French rower (1875–1921)

Olympic medal record

Men's rowing

Representing France
Gold medal – first place	1900 Paris	Coxed four

Jeanbaptiste Albert Joseph Cau (27 March 1875 in Tourcoing – 1921) was a French rower who competed in the 1900 Summer Olympics. He was part of the French boat Cercle de l'Aviron Roubaix, which won the gold medal in the coxed four.
