= Carl Lehle =

German rower (1872–1939)

Olympic medal record

Men's rowing

Representing Germany
Bronze medal – third place	1900 Paris	Coxed four B

Carl Georg Lehle (2 December 1872 in Eriskirch – 18 September 1939 in Ludwigshafen), also spelled as Karl, was a German rower who competed in the 1900 Summer Olympics. He was part of the German boat Ludwigshafener Ruderverein, which won the bronze medal in the coxed four final B.
