= Max Ammermann =

German rower

Max Ammermann (born 5 November 1878 in Hamburg, date of death unknown) was a German rower who competed in the 1900 Summer Olympics. He was the coxswain the German boat Favorite Hammonia, which won the bronze medal in the coxed fours final A. However the IOC medal database credits the bronze medal only to Gustav Moths, who participated only in the semi-final.
