= Adolf Möller =

German rower (1877–1968)

Olympic medal record

Men's rowing

Representing Germany
Bronze medal – third place	1900 Paris	Coxed four A

Adolf Möller (25 October 1877 in Hamburg – 10 November 1968 in Hamburg) was a German rower who competed in the 1900 Summer Olympics. He was part of the German crew who won the bronze medal in the coxed fours final A.
