= Ernst Felle =

German rower

Olympic medal record

Men's rowing

Representing Germany
Bronze medal – third place	1900 Paris	Coxed four B

Ferdinand Ernst Felle (26 April 1876 in Biberach an der Riss – 23 April 1959 in Heidelberg) was a German rower who competed in the 1900 Summer Olympics. He was part of the German boat Ludwigshafener Ruderverein, which won the bronze medal in the coxed four final B.
