= Émile Wegelin =

French rower (1875–1962)

Olympic medal record

Men's rowing

Representing France
Silver medal – second place	1900 Paris	Coxed four

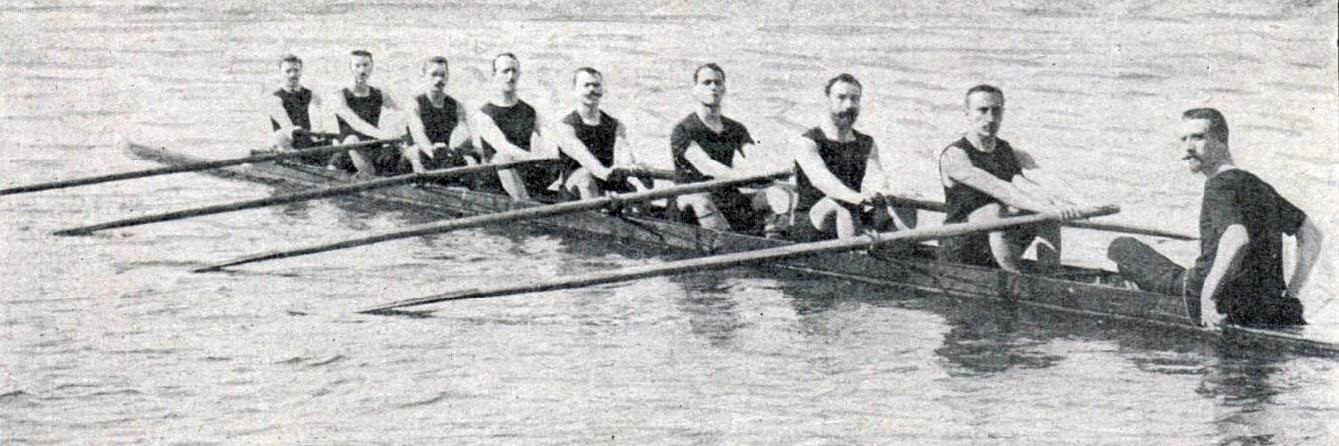
Wegelin (fourth from right) in 1900

Émile Robert Wegelin (24 December 1875 in Lyon – 26 June 1962 in Lyon) was a French rower who competed in the 1900 Summer Olympics. He was part of the French boat Club Nautique de Lyon, which won the silver medal in the coxed fours.
