= Carl Goßler =

German coxswain

Olympic medal record

Men's rowing

Representing Germany
Gold medal – first place	1900 Paris	Coxed four B

Carl Heinrich Goßler (17 April 1885 in Hamburg – 9 September 1914 in Maurupt-le-Montois) was a German rower who competed in the 1900 Summer Olympics. He was the coxswain of the German boat Germania Ruder Club, Hamburg, which won the gold medal in the coxed fours final B.

He was killed in action during World War I.

== See also ==
- List of Olympians killed in World War I
