= Paul Lotsij =

Dutch rower

Olympic medal record

Men's rowing
Silver medal – second place	1900 Paris	Coxed four B

Paulus Jan Lotsij (4 February 1880 in Dordrecht – 19 September 1910 in Amsterdam) was a Dutch rower who competed in the 1900 Summer Olympics.

He was part of the Dutch boat Minerva Amsterdam, which won the silver medal in the coxed fours final B.

He is the younger brother of Geert Lotsij.
