= Wilhelm Carstens =

German rower (1869–1941)

Olympic medal record

Men's rowing

Representing Germany
| Bronze medal – third place | 1900 Paris | Coxed four A |

Wilhelm Emil Carstens (29 January 1869 in Hamburg – 12 February 1941 in Hamburg) was a German rower who competed in the 1900 Summer Olympics. He was part of the German crew who won the bronze medal in the coxed fours final A.
