= Daniel Soubeyran =

French rower (1875–1959)

Olympic medal record

Men's rowing

Representing France
Silver medal – second place	1900 Paris	Coxed four

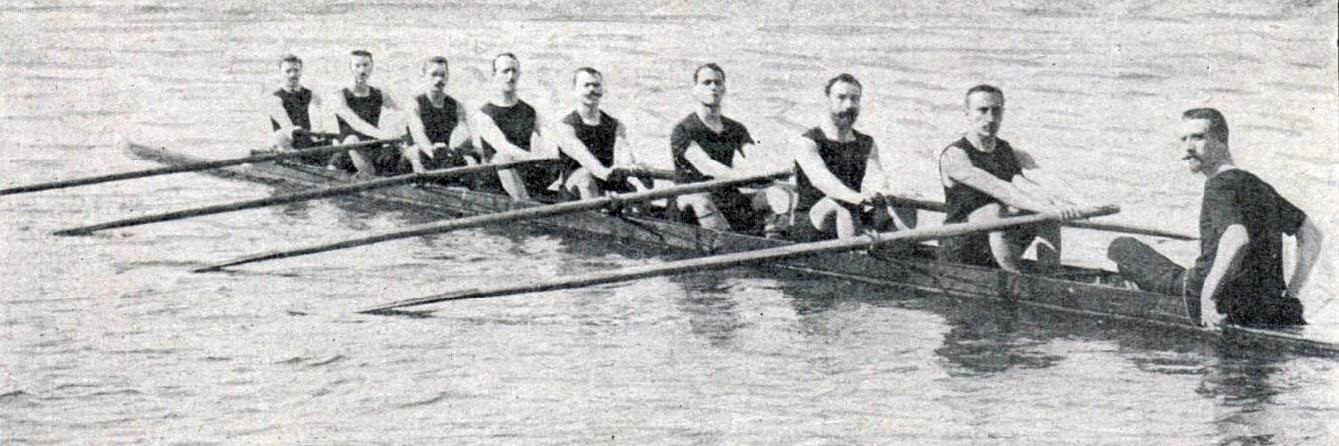
Soubeyran is the second from the left

Ovide Daniel Louis Henri Soubeyran (11 August 1875 in Dieulefit – 8 February 1959 in Turin, Italy) was a French rower who competed in the 1900 Summer Olympics. He died in Turin on 8 February 1959. He was part of the French boat Club Nautique de Lyon, which won the silver medal in the coxed four.
