= Hugo Rüster =

German rower (1872–1962)

Olympic medal record

Men's rowing

Representing Germany
Bronze medal – third place	1900 Paris	Coxed four A

Carl Wilhelm Hugo Rüster (15 January 1872 – 3 April 1962) was a German rower who competed in the 1900 Summer Olympics.

Rüster was part of the German crew who won the bronze medal in the coxed fours final A.
