= Gustav Goßler =

German rower (1879–1940)

Olympic medal record

Men's rowing

Representing Germany
Gold medal – first place	1900 Paris	Coxed four B

Gustav Ludwig Goßler (4 April 1879 in Hamburg – 4 April 1940 in Hamburg) was a German rower who competed in the 1900 Summer Olympics.

He was part of the German boat Germania Ruder Club, Hamburg, which won the gold medal in the coxed fours final B.
