= Geert Lotsij =

Dutch rower

Olympic medal record

Men's rowing
Silver medal – second place	1900 Paris	Coxed four B

Gerhard Oswald "Geert" Lotsij (13 January 1878 in Dordrecht – 29 June 1959 in Hilversum) was a Dutch rower who competed in the 1900 Summer Olympics.

He was part of the Dutch boat Minerva Amsterdam, which won the silver medal in the coxed fours final B.

He is the older brother of Paul Lotsij.
