= Julius Körner =

German rower (1870–1954)

Olympic medal record

Men's rowing

Representing Germany
Bronze medal – third place	1900 Paris	Coxed four A

Richard Wilhelm Julius Körner (22 December 1870 in Sülldorf– 19 November 1954 in Blankenese) was a German rower who competed in the 1900 Summer Olympics. He was part of the German crew who won the bronze medal in the coxed fours final A.
