= Franz Kröwerath =

German rower

Olympic medal record

Men's rowing

Representing Germany
Bronze medal – third place	1900 Paris	Coxed four B

Franz Kröwerath (30 June 1880 – 25 December 1945) was a German rower who competed in the 1900 Summer Olympics. He was the coxswain of the German boat Ludwigshafener Ruder Verein, which won the bronze medal in the coxed four final B.
