= Charles Perrin =

French rower (1875–1954)

Medal record

Men's rowing

Representing France

Olympic Games
Silver medal – second place	1900 Paris	Coxed four

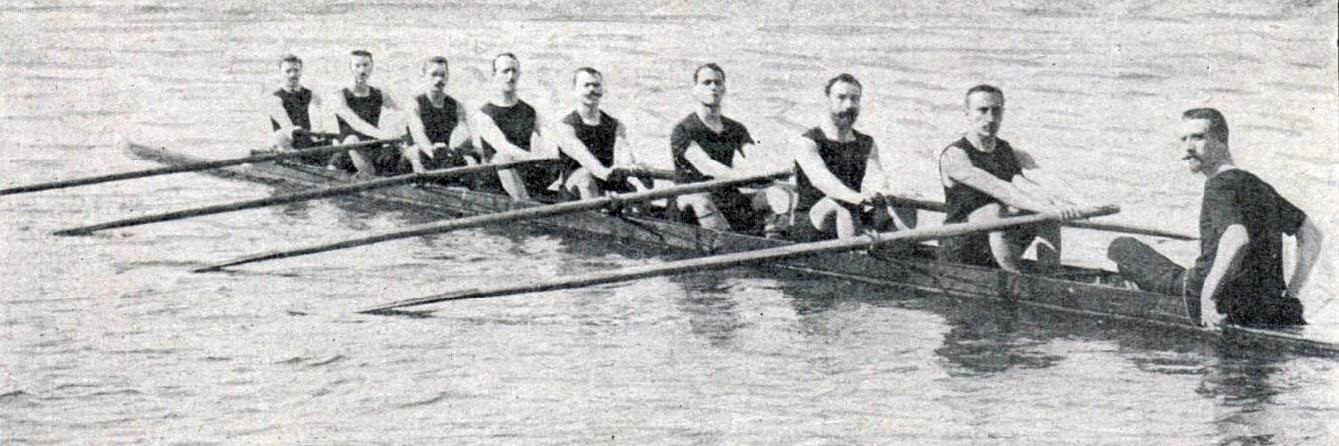
Perrin is the last one

Charles Jean Baptiste Perrin (6 July 1875 in Lyon – 26 March 1954 in Lyon) was a French rower who competed in the 1900 Summer Olympics.

He was part of the French boat Club Nautique de Lyon, which won the silver medal in the coxed four.
