= Hermann Wilker =

German rower (1874–1941)

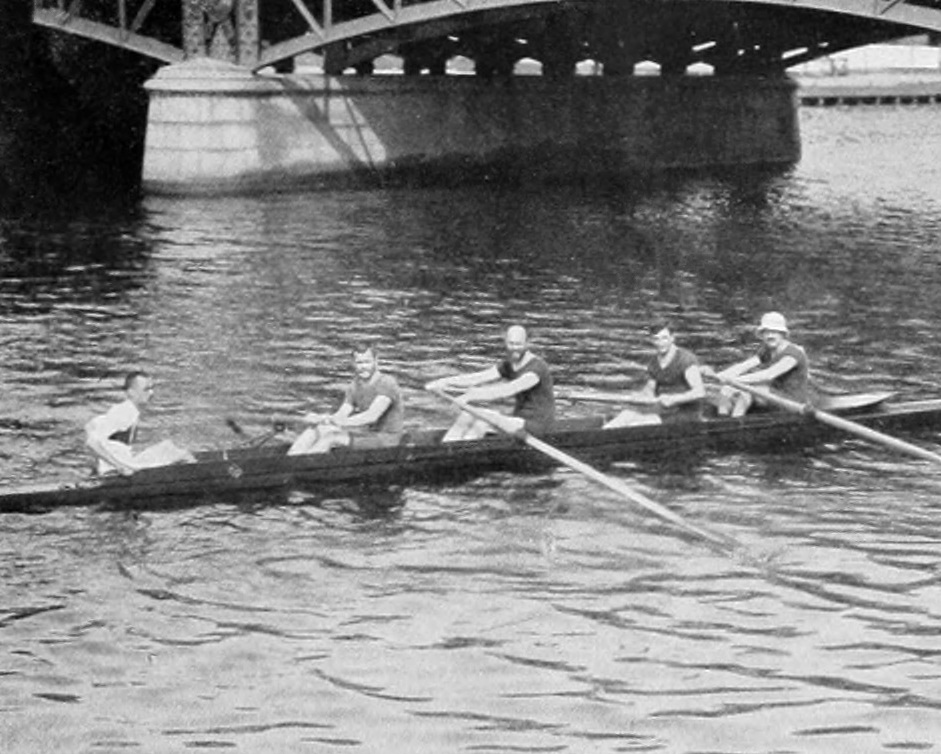
- Wilker at the 1912 Olympics

Personal information
- Born: 24 July 1874 Frankenthal, German Empire
- Died: 27 December 1941 (aged 67) Murrhardt, Nazi Germany
Medal record
Men's rowing at the Olympics
Representing Germany
| Gold medal – first place | 1912 Stockholm | Men's coxed four |
| Bronze medal – third place | 1900 Paris | Men's coxed four |

Hermann Wilker (24 July 1874 – 27 December 1941) was a German rower who competed in the 1900 Summer Olympics and in the 1912 Summer Olympics. In 1900 he was a crew member of the German boat, which won the bronze medal in the coxed fours. Twelve years later he won the gold medal in the coxed fours as part of the German team.
