= Otto Fickeisen =

German rower (1879–1963)

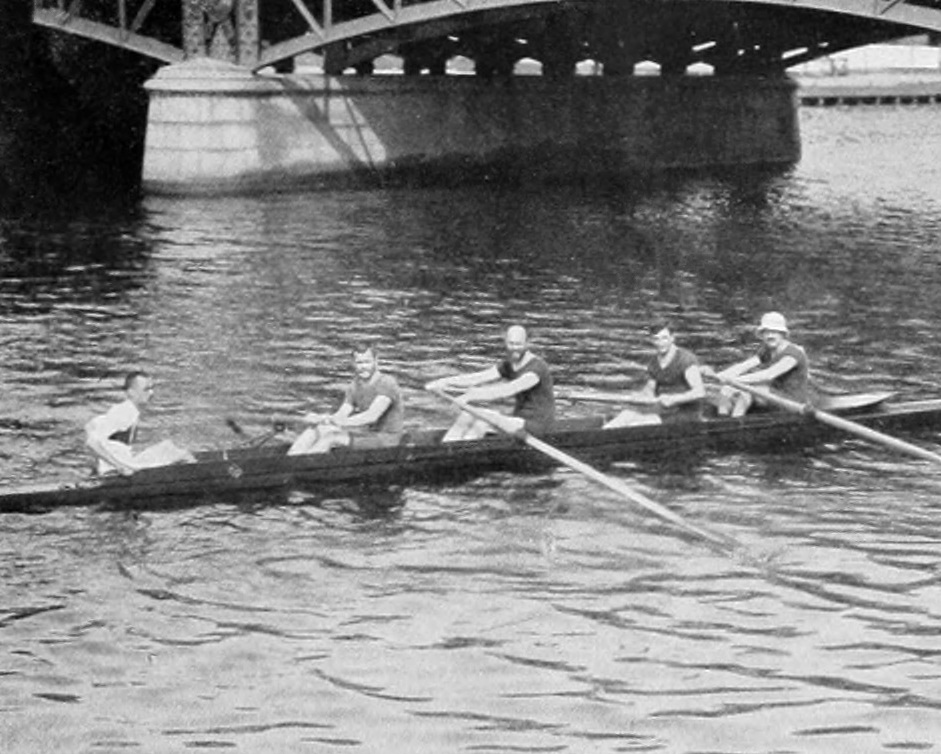
- Fickeisen at the 1912 Olympics

Personal information
- Born: 24 December 1879 Ludwigshafen, German Empire
- Died: 15 December 1963 (aged 83) Neustadt an der Weinstraße, West Germany
Medal record
Men's rowing at the Olympics
Representing Germany
Gold medal – first place	1912 Stockholm	Men's coxed four
Bronze medal – third place	1900 Paris	Men's coxed four

Otto Fickeisen (24 December 1879 – 15 December 1963) was a German rower who competed in the 1900 Summer Olympics and in the 1912 Summer Olympics. In 1900 he was a crew member of the German boat, which won the bronze medal in the coxed fours. Twelve years later he won the gold medal in the coxed fours as strokeman of the German team.
