= Der Hamburger und Germania Ruder Club =

Rowing club in Hamburg, Germany

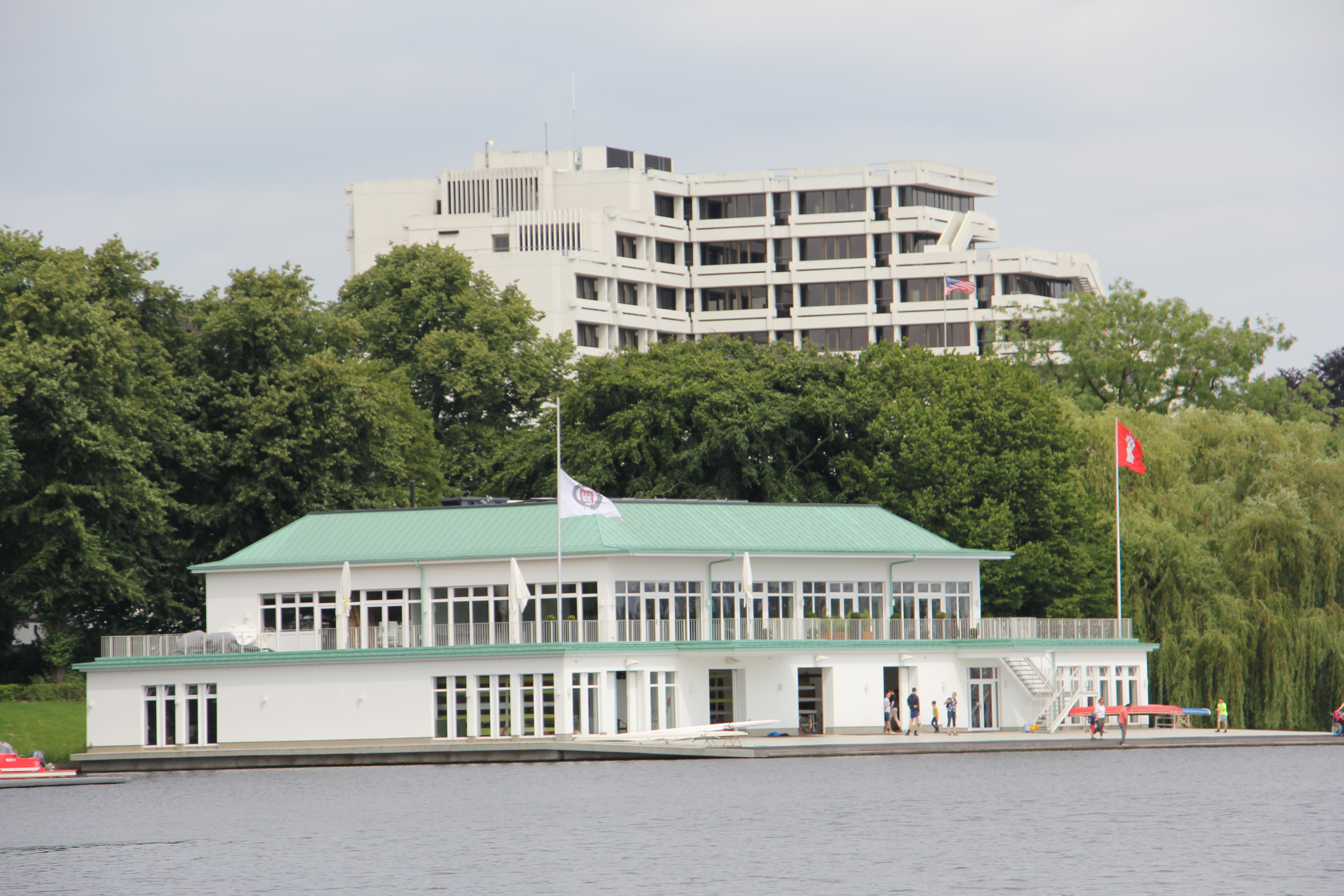
- Location: Alsterufer 21; 20354 Hamburg, Germany
- Coordinates: 53°33′38″N 9°59′51″E
- Home water: Außenalster
- Founded: 1836
- Former names: Der Hamburger Ruder Club (until 1934 merger)
- Website: www.der-club.de

Notable members
- Bastian Seibt

Der Hamburger und Germania Ruder Club (DHuGRC) is a rowing club from Rotherbaum, Hamburg, Germany. It was founded in 1836 as Der Hamburger Ruder Club, the club is the fourth oldest rowing club in the world (2nd if only counting non-academically affiliated clubs) after Brasenose College Boat Club, Jesus College Boat Club (Oxford) and Leander Club . The Germania Ruder Club, which was founded in 1854 merged with Der Hamburger Ruder Club in 1934, with the joint club adapting the current name.

The current boathouse at Außenalster was opened in 2016.

== Notable Rowers ==
Bastian Seibt from this club represented Germany at the 2008 Summer Olympics in Beijing, China.
