= List of canals in Belgium =

This is a list of canals in Belgium.

- Albert Canal
- Baudouin Canal
- Blankenberg Canal
- Blaton-Aat Canal
- Bocholt-Herentals Canal
- Bossuit-Kortrijk Canal
- Bourgogne Canal
- Briegden-Neerharen Canal
- Bruges–Ostend Canal
- Bruges-Sluis Canal
- Brussels Canal
- Brussels-Charleroi Canal
- Brussels–Scheldt Maritime Canal
- Canal du Centre
- Canal to Beverlo
- Cantelmo Ligne
- Damme Canal
- De Pauw Canal
- Dessel-Kwaadmechelen Canal
- Dessel-Turnhout-Schoten Canal
- Eeklo Canal
- Engelramsgeleed
- French Canal
- Garingatevliet
- Ghent Canal
- Ghent-Bruges Canal
- Ghent–Terneuzen Canal
- Gouden Hand
- Grootgeleed
- Grote Beverdijkvaart
- Haccourt-Visé Canal
- Hoge Waterring
- Isabella Canal
- Ketelvest
- Koolhofvaart
- Lanaye Canal
- Langeleed
- Leie Canal
- Lekevaart
- Leopold Canal
- Leuven-Dijle Canal
- Liespierres Canal
- Lieve
- Lissewegevaart
- Lo Canal
- Maleleie
- Moerdijkvaart
- Moervaart
- Mons-Condé Canal (does not exist anymore)
- Monsin Canal
- Nete Canal
- Newport-Dunkerque Canal
- Newport-Veurne Canal
- Nieuwe Watergang
- Nimy-Blaton-Péronnes Canal
- Noord-Ede
- Oude A-vaart
- Ourthe Canal
- Parma Canal
- Plassendale-Newport Canal
- Pommeroeul-Antoing Canal
- Pommeroeul-Condé Canal
- Proosdijkvaart
- Reep
- Reigersvliet
- Ring Canal (Bruges)
- Ring Canal (Ghent)
- Roeselare–Leie Canal
- Scheldt-Rhine Canal
- Schipdonk Canal
- South Willem's Canal
- Spermaliegeleed
- Spierekanaal
- Steengracht
- Veurne-Dunkerque Canal
- Veurne - Saint-Winoxbergen Canal
- Visserijvaart
- Vladslovaart
- Ypres-Comines Canal
- Ypres-IJzer Canal
- Zuidervaart
- Zwinnevaart
