= Sint-Martens-Leerne =

Village in Belgium

Coordinates: 51°00′48″N 3°35′03″E

Location of Sint-Martens-Leerne

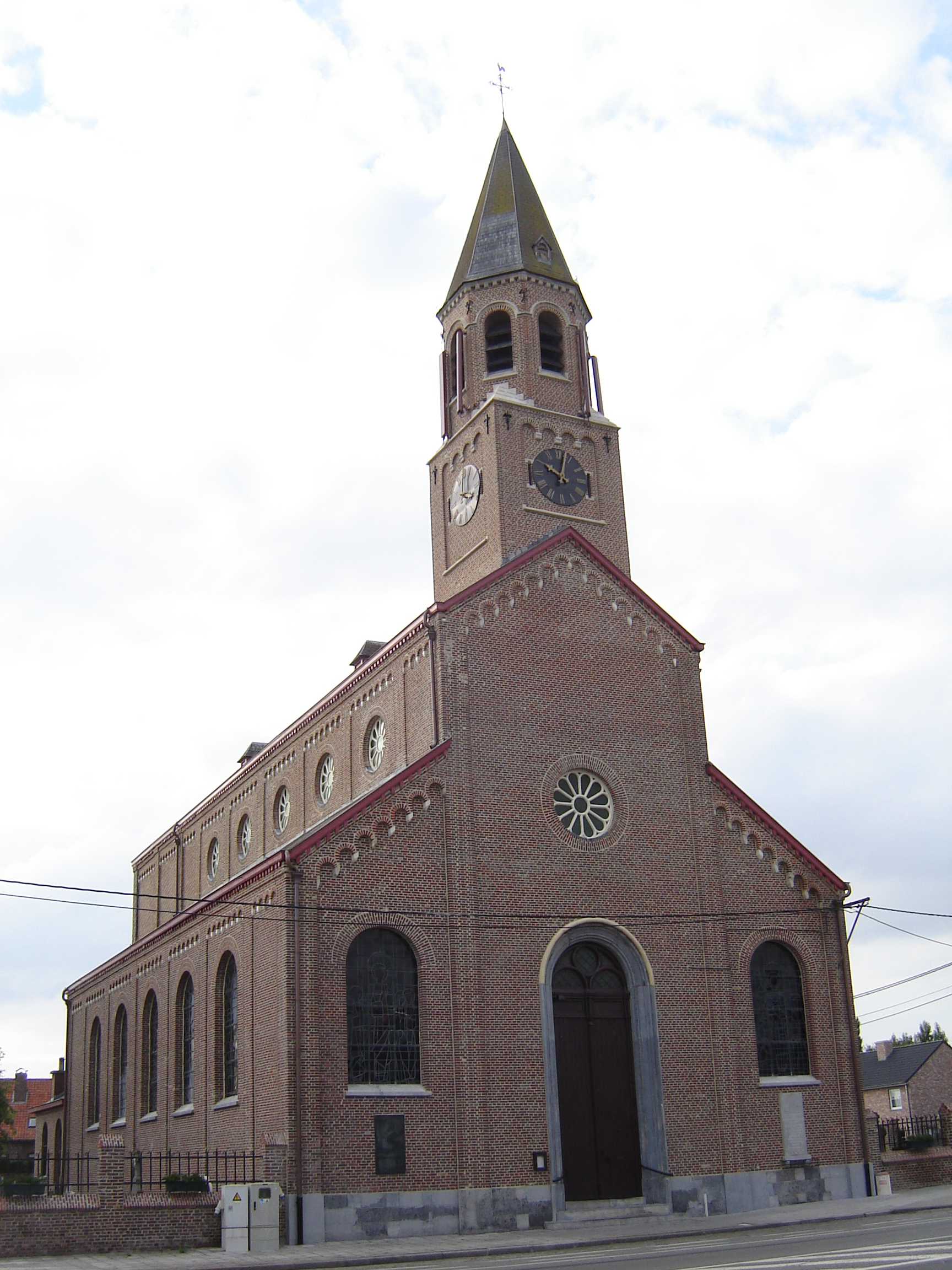
Church of Sint-Martens-Leerne

Sint-Martens-Leerne is a village in the Belgian province of East Flanders and is a submunicipality of Deinze. It was an independent municipality until the municipal reorganization of 1977. Sint-Martens-Leerne is located on the Lys river. It has a surface area of 378 ha. The eastern part belongs to the Leie valley and the western (largest) part to Zandig Vlaanderen. The village centre is fused with that of Sint-Maria-Leerne, in the sub-municipality of Bachte-Maria-Leerne. The two churches are only 600 metres apart. The village had 820 inhabitants in 1981.

The oldest mention of Sint-Martens-Leerne is from 1192 as Lederna and later in 1206 by Sancti Martini as Lederne. The lordship belonged to the lords of Nevele. Other lordships at Sint-Martens-Leerne were those of Hansbeke, Dentergem and Gampelare. In the 14th-century, several important farms were already mentioned.

The history of the church goes back to 1206, and was then in the possession of the chapter of Tournai.
