= Nevele =

- Village and former municipality
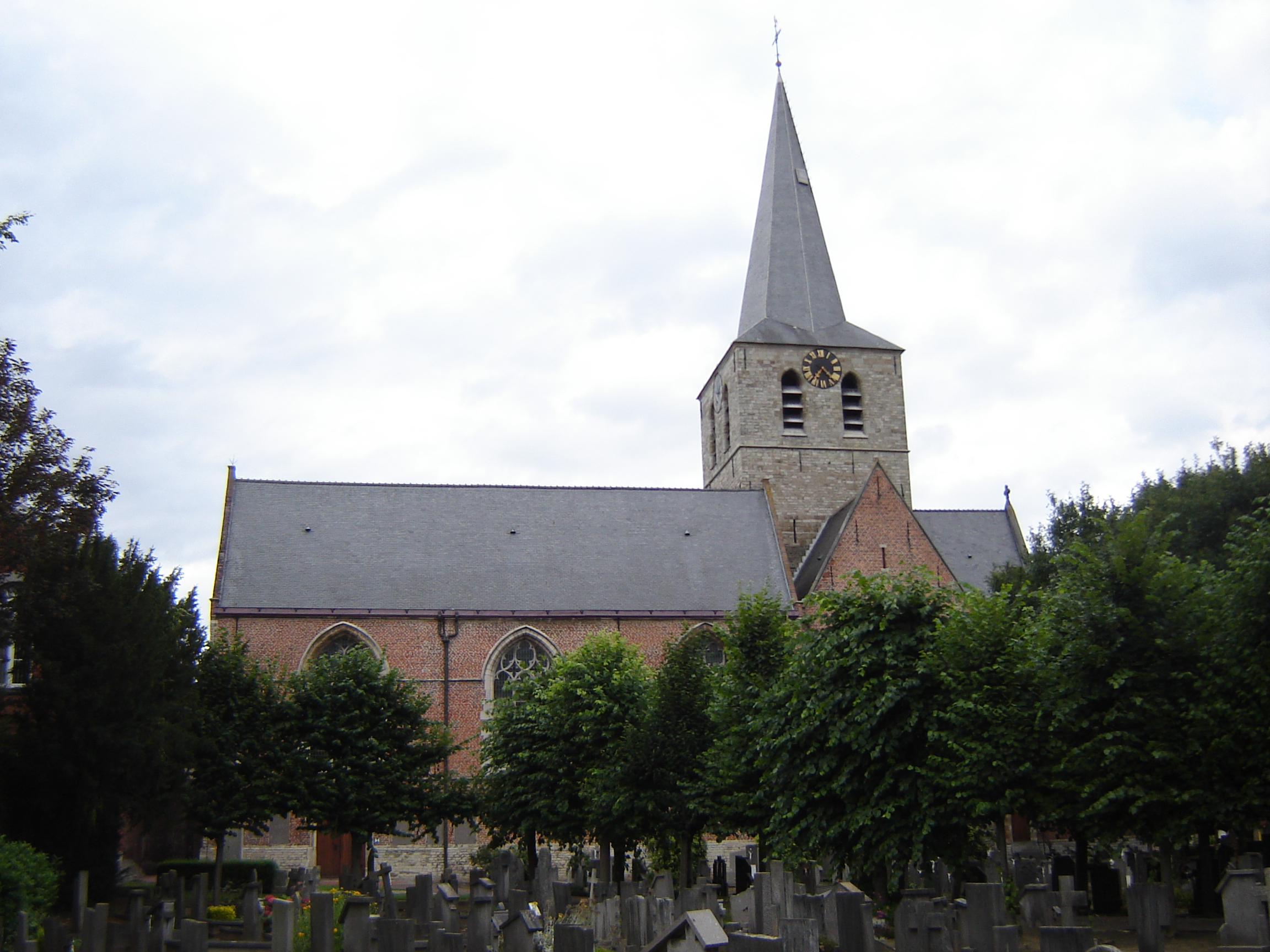
- St Mauritius and Gezellen Church

- Flag Seal

- Location in Belgium
- Coordinates: 51°02′N 03°33′E
- Country: Belgium
- Region: Flemish Region
- Province: East Flanders
- Arrondissement: Ghent
- Municipality: Deinze

Area
  - Total: 13.90 km^{2} (5.37 sq mi)

Population (2021)
  - Total: 2,875
  - Density: 206.8/km^{2} (535.7/sq mi)
- Time zone: CET
- Postal code: 9850
- Dialing code: 09
- Website: www.deinze.be

Nevele (Dutch pronunciation: [ˈneːvələ]) is a village and former municipality located in the Belgian province of East Flanders. The municipality comprises the towns of Hansbeke, Landegem, Merendree, Nevele proper, Poesele and Vosselare. In 2018, the municipality of Nevele had a total population of 12,179. The total area is 51.89 km^{2}.

Effective 1 January 2019, the municipality was merged into Deinze.

== Subdivisions ==
Nevele consisted of six deelgemeenten (sub-municipalities).

#	Name	Area	Population
I	Nevele	13,86
II	Hansbeke	9,83
III	Merendree	10,94
IV	Landegem	8,48
V	Poesele	2,52
VI	Vosselare	6,27

Nevele has borders with:

- a. Lovendegem
- b. Drongen (Ghent)
- c. Sint-Martens-Leerne (Deinze)
- d. Bachte-Maria-Leerne (Deinze)
- e. Meigem (Deinze)
- f. Lotenhulle (Aalter)
- g. Bellem (Aalter)
- h. Zomergem

== Famous inhabitants ==
- Cyriel Buysse, novelist
- Renaat de Rudder: born in Oostakker in 1897, he moved with his parents to Landegem in 1909. In 1914 he volunteered for the Belgian army to fight in the First World War, where he wrote on the physical and moral pain he was suffering, until he died on 12 December 1917.
- Rosalie Loveling and Virginie Loveling, writers, aunts of Cyriel Buysse
- Leo Lovaert
- Monika van Paemel

== Gallery ==
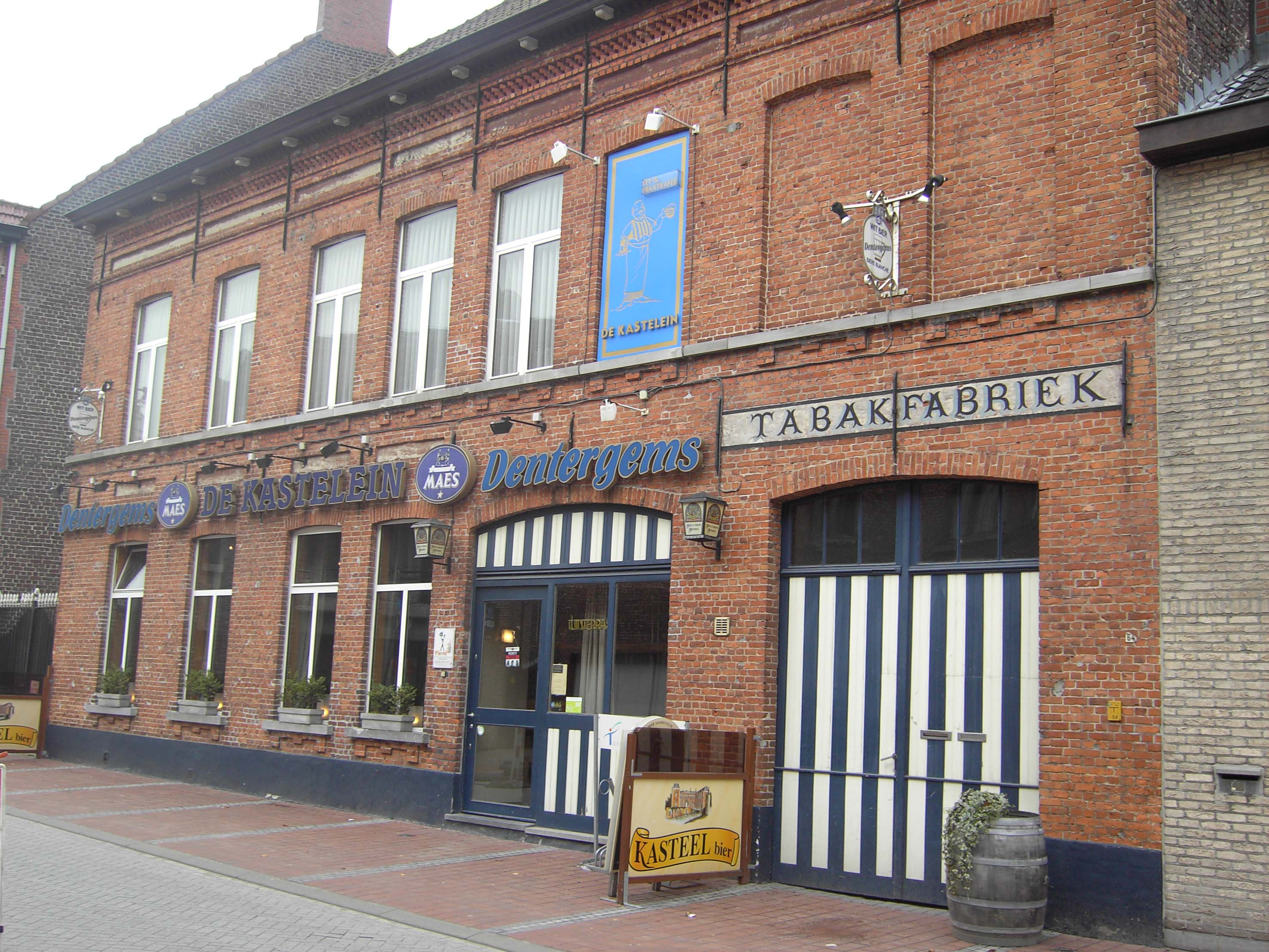
Former tobacco factory

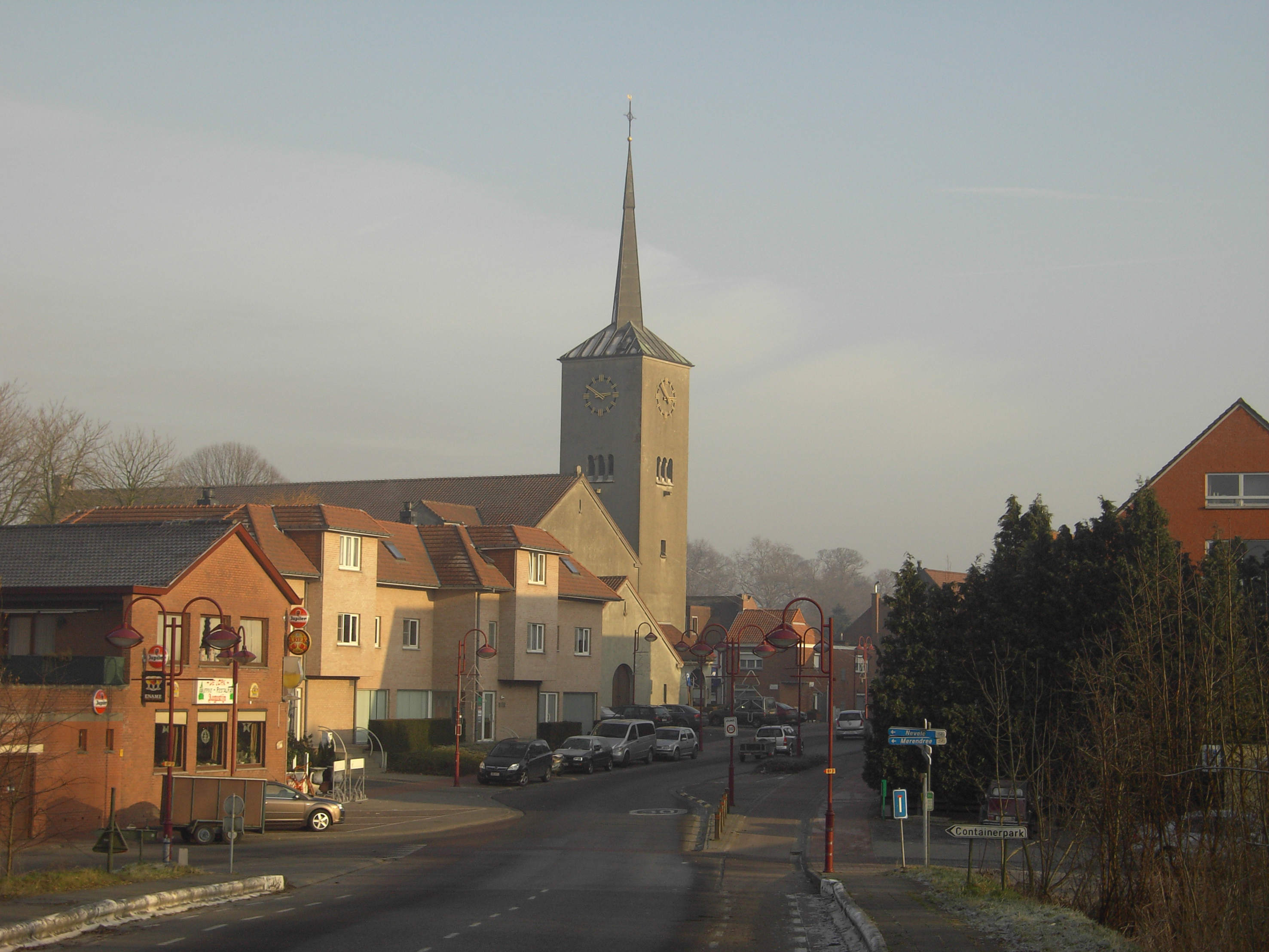
View of Landegem

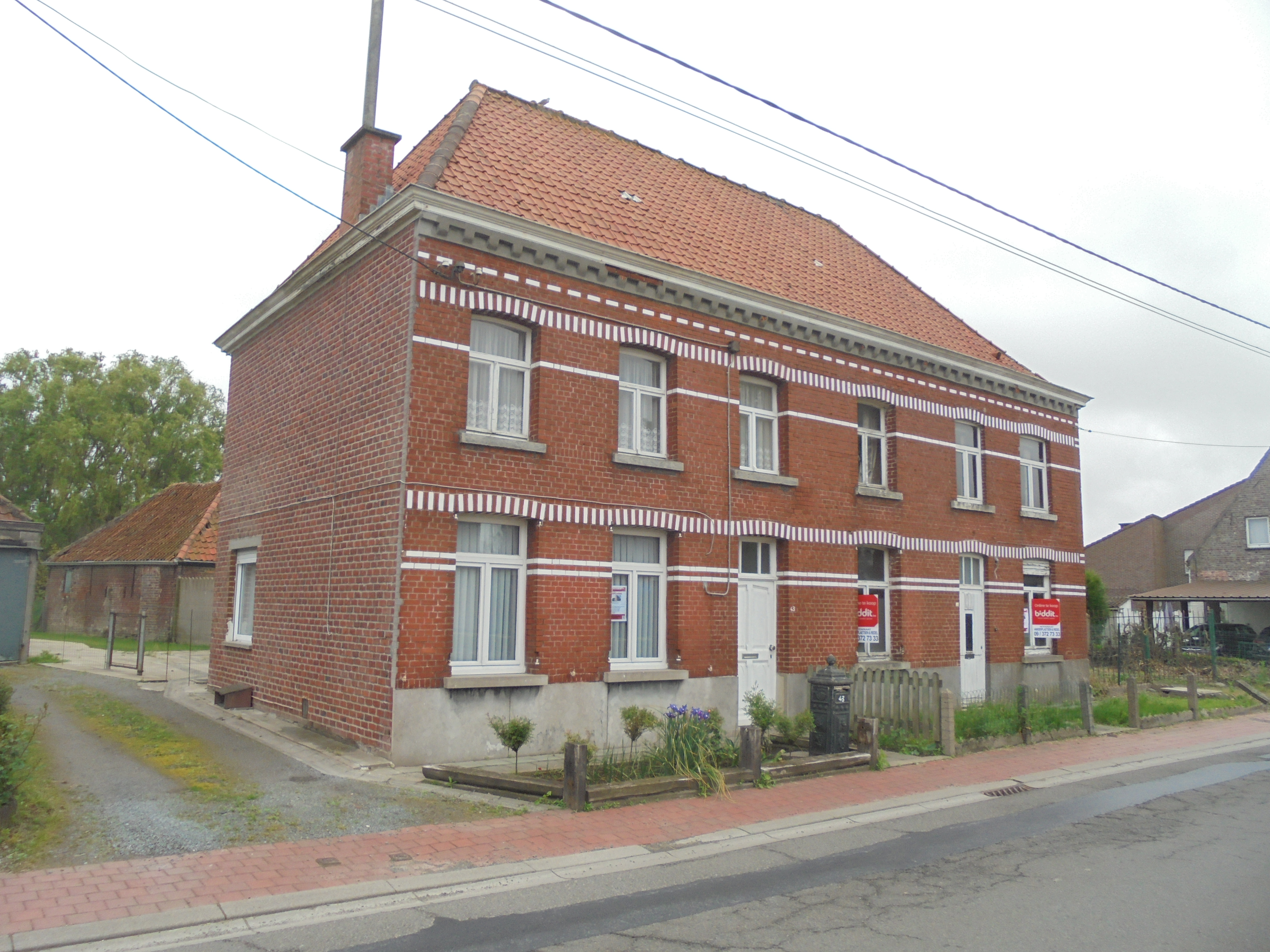
House in Nevele

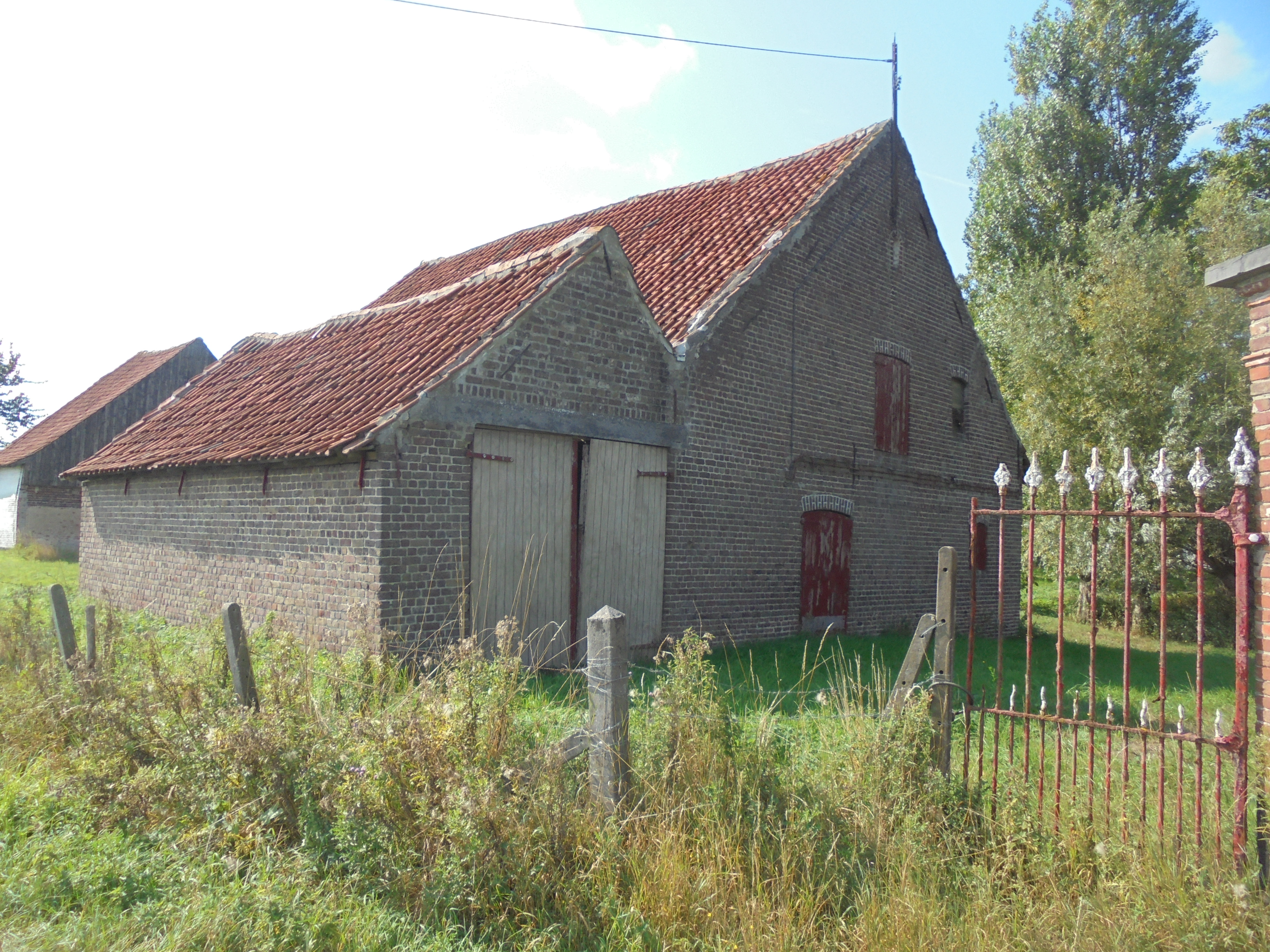
Farm in Nevele
