= Van Paemel =

Van Paemel may refer to:

- Monika van Paemel (born 1945), Belgian writer
- The van Paemel Family, 1986 Belgian film
