= Leucocoma =

Scientific classification
- Kingdom: Plantae
- Clade: Tracheophytes
- Clade: Angiosperms
- Clade: Eudicots
- Order: Ranunculales
- Family: Ranunculaceae
- Genus: Leucocoma; Nieuwl.

Genus of plants

Leucocoma is a genus of flowering plants belonging to the family Ranunculaceae.

Species:

- Leucocoma albens Lunell
- Leucocoma vegeta Lunell
