= Merendree =

Village in Belgium

Coordinates: 51°04′39″N 3°34′35″E

Location of Merendree

Coat of arms of Merendree

Merendree is a village in the Belgian province of East Flanders and is a submunicipality of Deinze. It was an independent municipality until the municipal reorganization of 1977. The village is located in the south of Meetjesland, at the intersection of the Gent-Brugge Canal and the Schipdonk Canal.

The earliest written mention of the village is from the year 722 as Merendra. In 2024, the remains of a Roman vicus were found.
