= Damme Canal =

Canal in Belgium

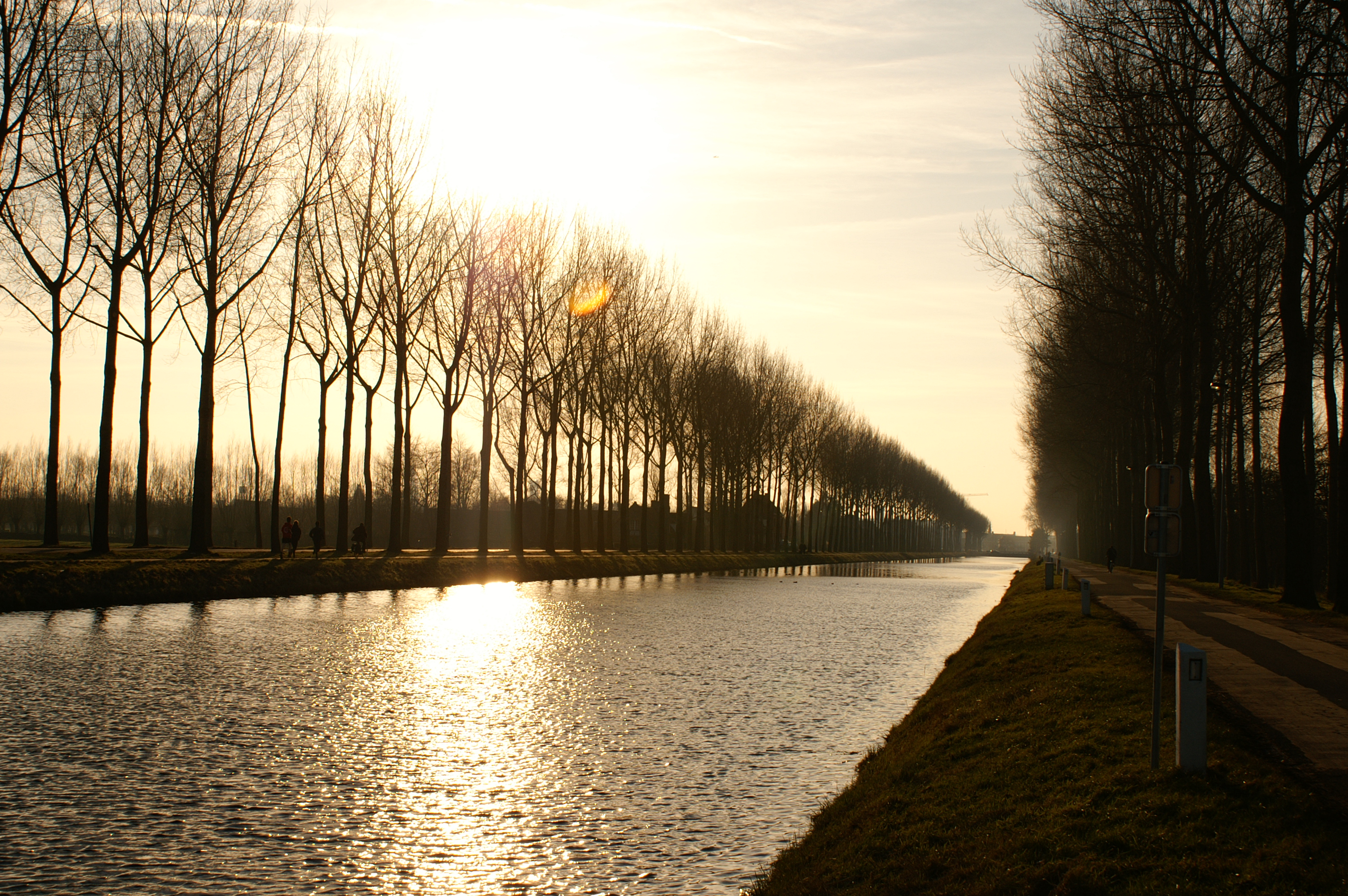
- The Damme Canal in winter
- Interactive map of Damme Canal
- Country: Belgium, Netherlands

Specifications
- Length: 15 km (9.3 miles)

Geography
- Direction: Northeast
- Start point: Bruges
- End point: Sluis
- Beginning coordinates: 51°13′16″N 03°14′02″E
- Ending coordinates: 51°18′29″N 03°23′06″E

The Damme Canal (French: Canal de Damme. Dutch: Damse Vaart or Napoleonvaart) is a canal in the Belgian province of West Flanders. The canal links Bruges with the Western Scheldt at Sluis, Netherlands. It was constructed on the orders of Napoleon Bonaparte who wished to create a canal network in order to permit the efficient transport of troops without the risk of disruptive interventions from the British navy.

Following the defeat of Napoleon, the original strategic imperative for the canal was removed. The plans in the Napoleonic era had called for a link to the Scheldt at Breskens. Half a century later the canal opened to traffic in 1856, and the link with the sea had moved to Sluis.

At Damme the canal crosses the Leopold Canal and the Schipdonk Canal, both of which were dug in the middle years of the nineteenth century in order to reduce the vulnerability of the Belgian canal network to Dutch interference, after the achievement in 1830 of Belgian independence. It was necessary to create a system of Siphons because of the differences in water level of the three canals. The canal was used until 1940 when French troops destroyed the siphon system: this put an end to maritime transport on the Damme Canal.

After World War II use of the canal resumed, but it was used now by pleasure boats, along with a tourist boat connecting Damme and Bruges.
