= Erwin Mortier =

Dutch-language Belgian author (born 1965)

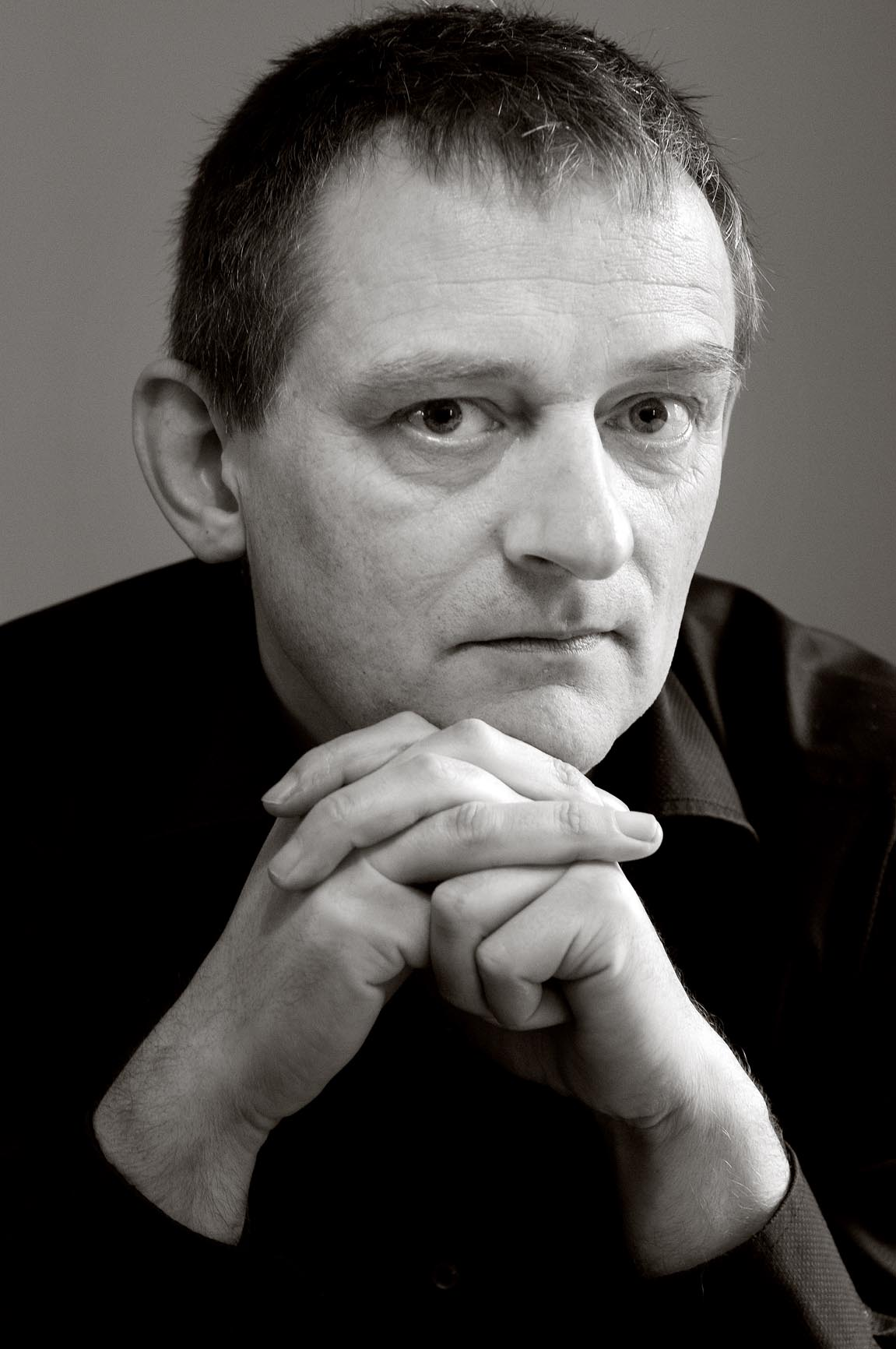
- Mortier in 2008
- Born: 28 November 1965 (age 60); Nevele, Belgium
- Occupations: writer, poet, essayist
- Partner: Lieven Vandenhaute (late 1980s—present)
- Website: erwinmortier.be

Erwin Mortier (born 28 November 1965) is a Dutch-language Belgian author. Spending his youth in Hansbeke, he later moved to nearby Ghent, where he became city poet (2005–2006).

He wrote as a columnist for newspapers like De Morgen and published several novels:

- Marcel (1999) – ISBN 2-213-61352-4
- My Fellow Skin – ISBN 1-84343-046-0
- Shutter Speed – ISBN 1-84343-172-6
- While the Gods Were Sleeping (2008)

Collections of his poetry were published from 2001 on.

Among the literary prizes awarded to Mortier there are debut prizes in Belgium and in the Netherlands for Marcel, in 2002 the C. Buddingh' prize for his debut in poetry, and in 2009 the AKO Literatuurprijs for While the Gods Were Sleeping.

Mortier came out of the closet with A plea for sinning, a collection of essays (2003). Other non-fiction included Evenings on the Estate: Travelling with Gerard Reve (2007), and A farewell to Congo: Back to the equator with Jef Geeraerts (2010).

He translated war prose by Ellen N. La Motte, Mary Borden and Enid Bagnold in Dutch, and produced the first Dutch translation of Virginia Woolf's Between the Acts.
