= Landegem =

Village in East Flanders, Belgium

Location of Landegem

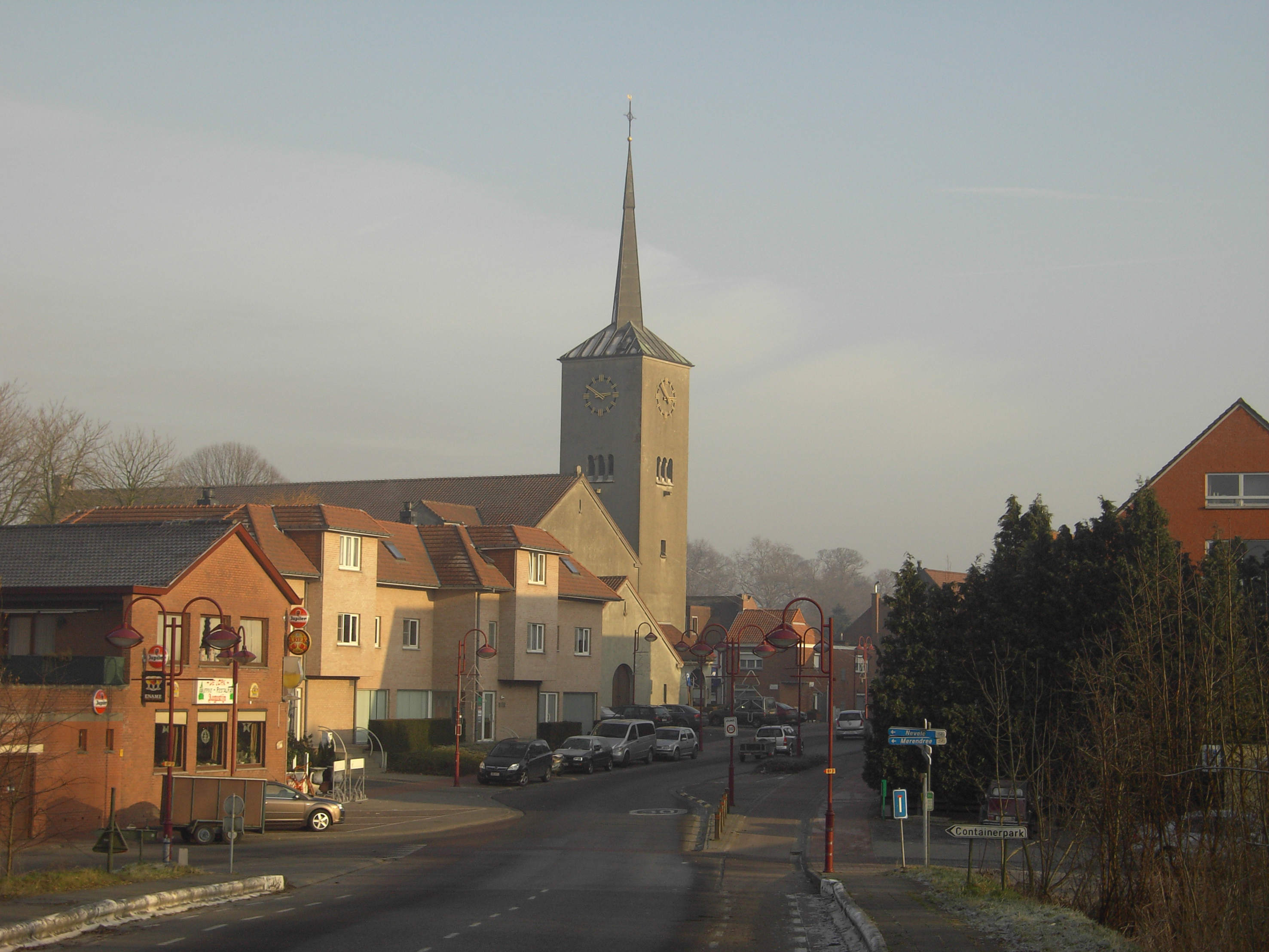
Landegem (2009)

Landegem is a village in the Belgian province of East Flanders and is a submunicipality of Deinze. It was an independent municipality until the municipal reorganization of 1977. The village is along the Schipdonk Canal, roughly following the route of Oude Kale. The Oude Kale was restored to a meandering watercourse in 2017 and further improved in 2024. The patron saint of Landegem is Saint Blaise, to whom the church is dedicated.

In the 10th century, Landegem was mentioned in the Liber Traditionem of the Saint Peter's Abbey in Ghent as villa Landengehem. The largest part belonged to the lord of Nevele during the feudal era.
