= Vosselare =

- Deelgemeente
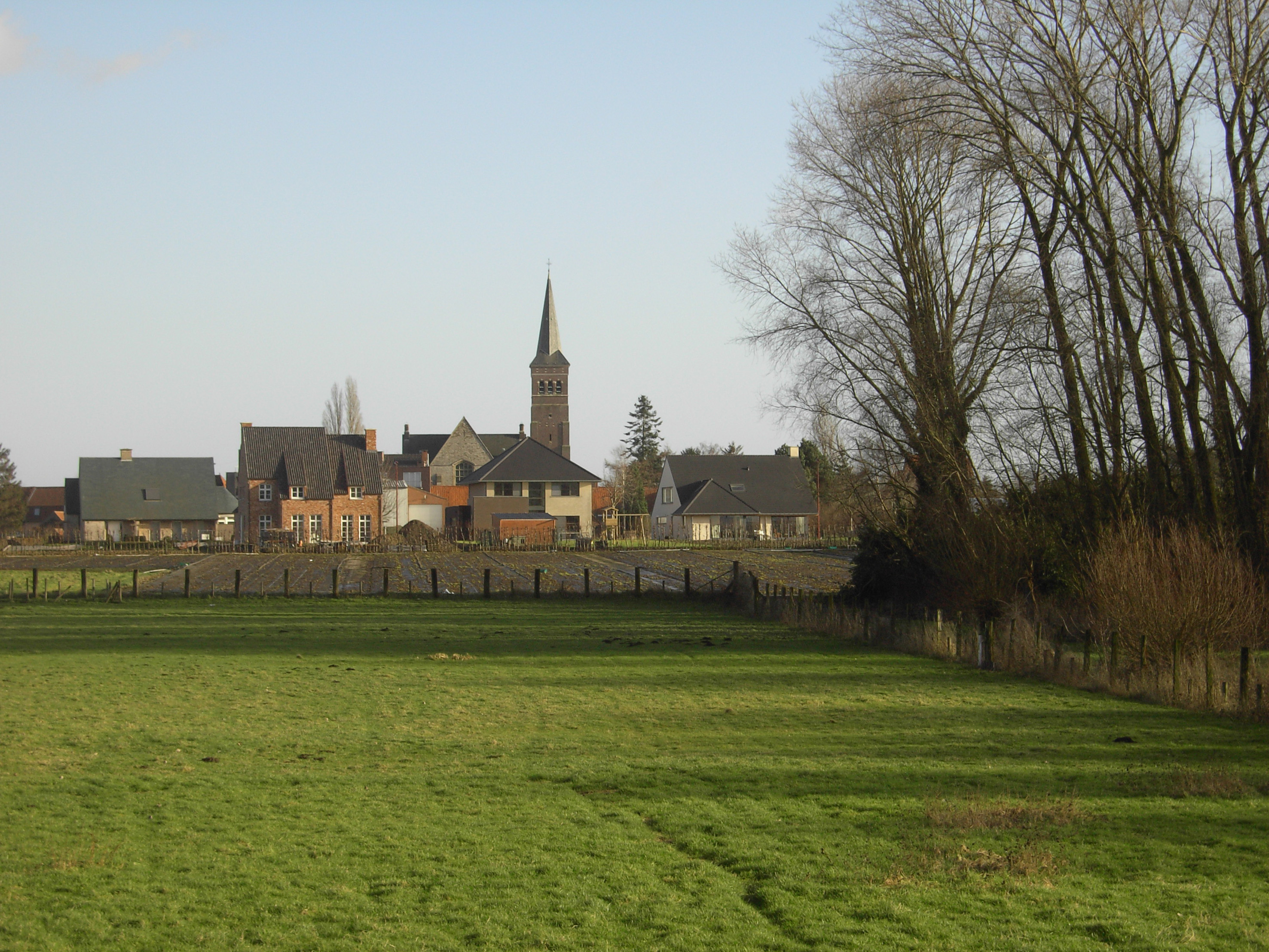
- Vosselare seen from the Schipdonk Canal

- Location in Belgium
- Coordinates: 51°01′35″N 3°33′18″E
- Country: Belgium
- Province: East Flanders
- Municipality: Nevele

Area
  - Total: 6.21 km^{2} (2.40 sq mi)

Population (2021)
  - Total: 1,468
  - Density: 236/km^{2} (612/sq mi)
- Postal code: 9850

Vosselare is a village and submunicipality of the municipality of Deinze, in the province of East Flanders, Belgium.

== History ==
The parish is first mentioned in 694 as Fursitio in the yearbook of the St-Peter Abbey of Ghent, and again in 802. Later on it is referred to as 'Voslariensis ecclesiae' (1087), Vurslar (1122), Vorselar (1125), Furselare (1130), Vurselaer (1140), Vorselaer (1147), Vursselare (1230, 1320, 1579), Vorslaer (1330), Vurselare (1364, 1500) and Vosselare for the first time in 1650. The name ‘Vosselaere’ is also used.

Although other explanations are given, the name Vosselare probably originates from 'Vurst' and 'Laar', meaning an open, empty space in a forest.

The village of Vosselare was attacked by Charles de Valois's army in 1300. The village was also affected by the battle of Nevele on 13 May 1381. On 25 May 1452 there was another battle near the village, between the city of Ghent, under the command of Jean Van Melle, and the Count of Estampes. Geuzen attacked the church and a farmhouse on 4 October 1575. The village was attacked by Louis XIV's French troops in May 1673, October 1674, January 1675 and during the siege of Ghent in 1678. Six thousand French knights occupied the village and destroyed the harvest on 18 August 1684. The church was pillaged twice in 1688, and again in 1691 and 1696. Mortality also increased between 1676 and 1695 by an (unnamed) epidemic disease.

=== Famous families ===
The heerlijkheid Vosselare is known from its lord 'Willelmus de Vurslar' or 'de Forselar' (1122, 1125), while his brother Balduinus de Furslare is mentioned in 1130. The family is also mentioned later as Heinric van Vurselare (1364) and Arnold van Vurselaer (1413) but the heerlijkheid was already passed over to Thomas van den Turre, who was mentioned as a participant in the Battle of the Golden Spurs in 1302.

== Monuments ==
=== Heerlijkheid castle ===
Within Vosselare, the heerlijkheid (or the 'Hof Ter Meeren' or 'Hof ter Mere' castle) is of importance. It belonged to the lords ‘de Meere’ or ‘van der Meere(n)’. The heerlijkheid covered parts of many neighbouring communities. The castle was destroyed during World War I, and was rebuilt in 1923–1924.

There is also the heerlijkheid castle of the 'Goed ter Meersch', also located in Vosselare. A large farm with the same name still remains. It is supposed to have been a possession of the Knights Templar, passing over to the Van der Meersch family in 1314. The castle of the Van der Meersch family, located on the site of the current farm, Goed ter Meersch, was destroyed during the Battle of Nevele, 13 May 1381.

=== Church ===
The church is first mentioned in 1087. Van Hoorebeke argues that it was possibly one of the first churches in Flanders with a belltower. A new church building is supposed to have been built by the Knights Templar at the end of their existence, resulting in a close connection between the church and the Van der Meersch noble family, who are supposed to descend from a Knight Templar. The church was severely damaged in 1940 and was rebuilt in 1953 by the architect Vaerwyck-Suys.

=== Meerelinde lime tree ===
Previously, there was a large lime tree named ‘Meerelinde’ at the crossroad leading to the Hof ter Mere castle, which was, in the 19th century, referred to as one of the most impressive trees of Europe. Reports on its circumference at the base vary: 9.20 meters (1856), 9.75 meters (1845), or more than 12 meters (1870). More than 30 people fitted in a cavity in the trunk in 1838. The tree had an age of ca. 800 years in the 19th century.
