= Bachte-Maria-Leerne =

Coordinates: 51°00′16″N 3°33′53″E

Location of Bachte-Maria-Leerne

Bachte-Maria-Leerne is a sub-municipality of Deinze in the Belgian province of East Flanders. It was an independent municipality until the municipal reorganization of 1977. The sub-municipality is located along the Lys river, the closed river branch Oude Leie and the Schipdonk Canal.

Bachte-Maria-Leerne was founded in 1823 by merging the villages and parishes of Bachte and Sint-Maria-Leerne.

In March 1919, the notorious Vanhoe-Verstuyft gang stormed a farm in Bachte-Maria-Leerne.
