= Zeveren =

Village in Belgium

Coordinates: 50°59′47″N 3°30′03″E

Location of Zeveren

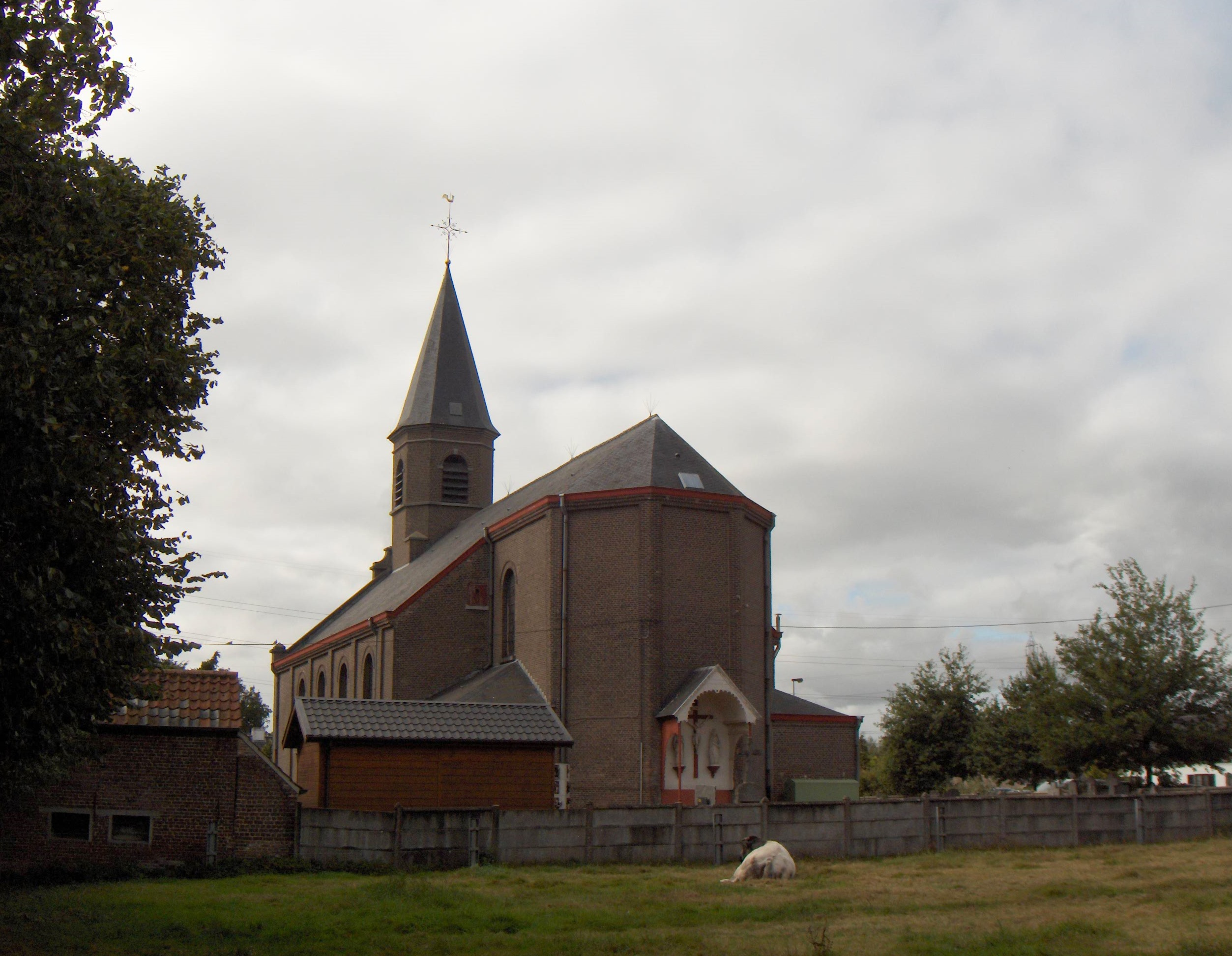
Church in Zeveren

Zeveren is a village in the Belgian province of East Flanders and is a submunicipality of Deinze. It was an independent municipality until the municipal reorganization of 1977. Zeveren is located west of Deinze, near the border with West Flanders, near the Oude Mandel. The village had 821 inhabitants in 1981.

== History ==
Roman finds indicate an ancient origin of the settlement, located on a Roman road.

Zeveren was first mentioned in 1146, as Severne. The place name refers to a personal name. Various farms were founded, including those dependent on the Papinglo farm. The "Van Severne" or "Van Zeveren" families were mentioned in relation to the lordships. The lordship was later part of the princely domain, and was issued to Pieter de Bevere in 1577. In 1613 it belonged to Jacob de Caluwaert. In 1649 Anna-Maria de Caluwaert married Nicolaas-Ignaas de Beer, who was also lord of Meulebeke. In 1773 the lordship was publicly sold to Philip-Jan-Maurits de Heems Patijn.

War actions were first mentioned in the mid-17th century. In 1643 there was a quartering and at the end of the 17th century the village had to provide food and horse feed for the troops stationed there, which led to impoverishment. Also in 1708, during the Siege of Ghent, there were high charges levied that the village had to pay for the troops.
