= Rose Bertram =

Belgian model

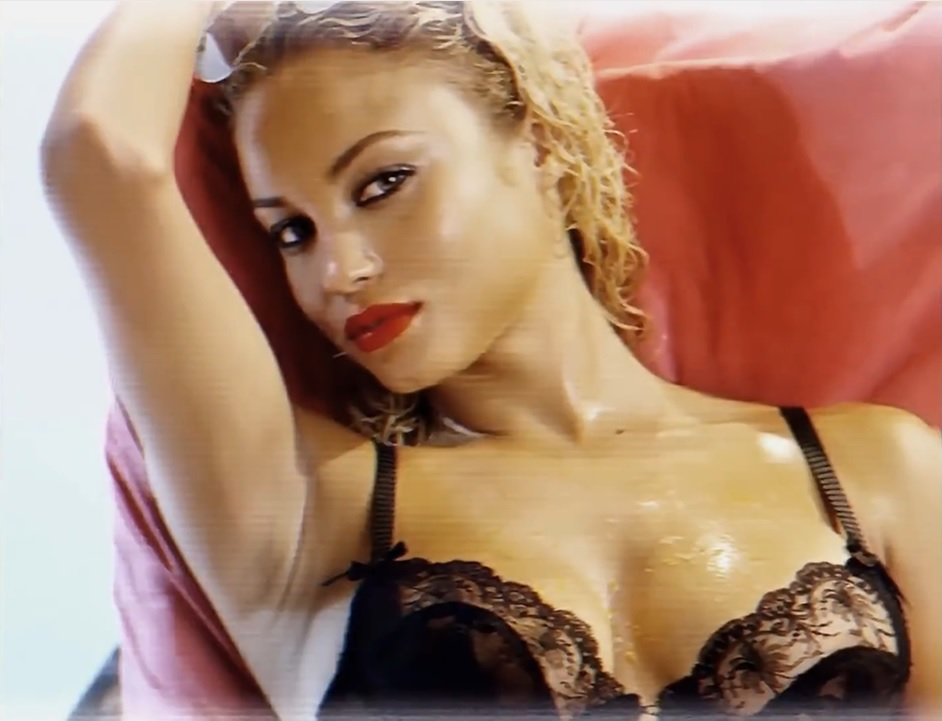
- Rose Bertram for Love Advent 2016
- Born: Stephanie Rose Bertram; 26 October 1994 (age 32); Kortrijk, Belgium
- Other name: Stephanie Bertram-Rose
- Occupation: Model
- Children: 2
- Modeling information
- Height: 1.70 m (5 ft 7 in)
- Hair color: Blonde
- Eye color: Green
- Agency: One Management (New York); Fashion Model Management (Milan); The Squad (London); Dominique Models (Brussels); Two Management (Copenhagen, Los Angeles); SPIN Model Management (Hamburg)

Stephanie Rose Bertram (born 26 October 1994), known as Rose Bertram, is a Belgian model.

== Early life and family ==
Rose Bertram was born in Kortrijk; her father is a Belgian of Scottish descent while her mother is of Angolan and Senegalese descent. Her mother signed her with a modeling agency when Rose was 13. Bertram was raised in Deinze (Flanders).

== Career ==
Bertram was cast by the Dominique agency at 16 and attracted notice through her work with Juergen Teller for Jambox; she has since appeared in campaigns for H&M, L'Oréal, Hunkemöller, Primark, and Agent Provocateur among others. She moved to the United States at age 18, and signed with Marilyn.

She was the subject of photo articles in Oyster, shot by Tyler, the Creator, and in Galore, and modeled for several fashion houses. In 2015, she was the first Belgian model to be featured in the Sports Illustrated Swimsuit Issue.

Bertram made her film debut as actress in 2023, with a role in the action comedy Scotoe.

== Personal life and family ==
Bertram had a relationship with the Dutch football player Gregory van der Wiel, At the time they met, she was 17. They lived in Paris while van der Wiel was playing for Paris Saint-Germain; after his transfer to the Turkish club Fenerbahçe in 2016, they moved to Istanbul. In 2018, Bertram and Van der Wiel had a daughter, born in Toronto. The couple had a second daughter but their relationship ended in 2022.
