= Hansbeke =

- Village
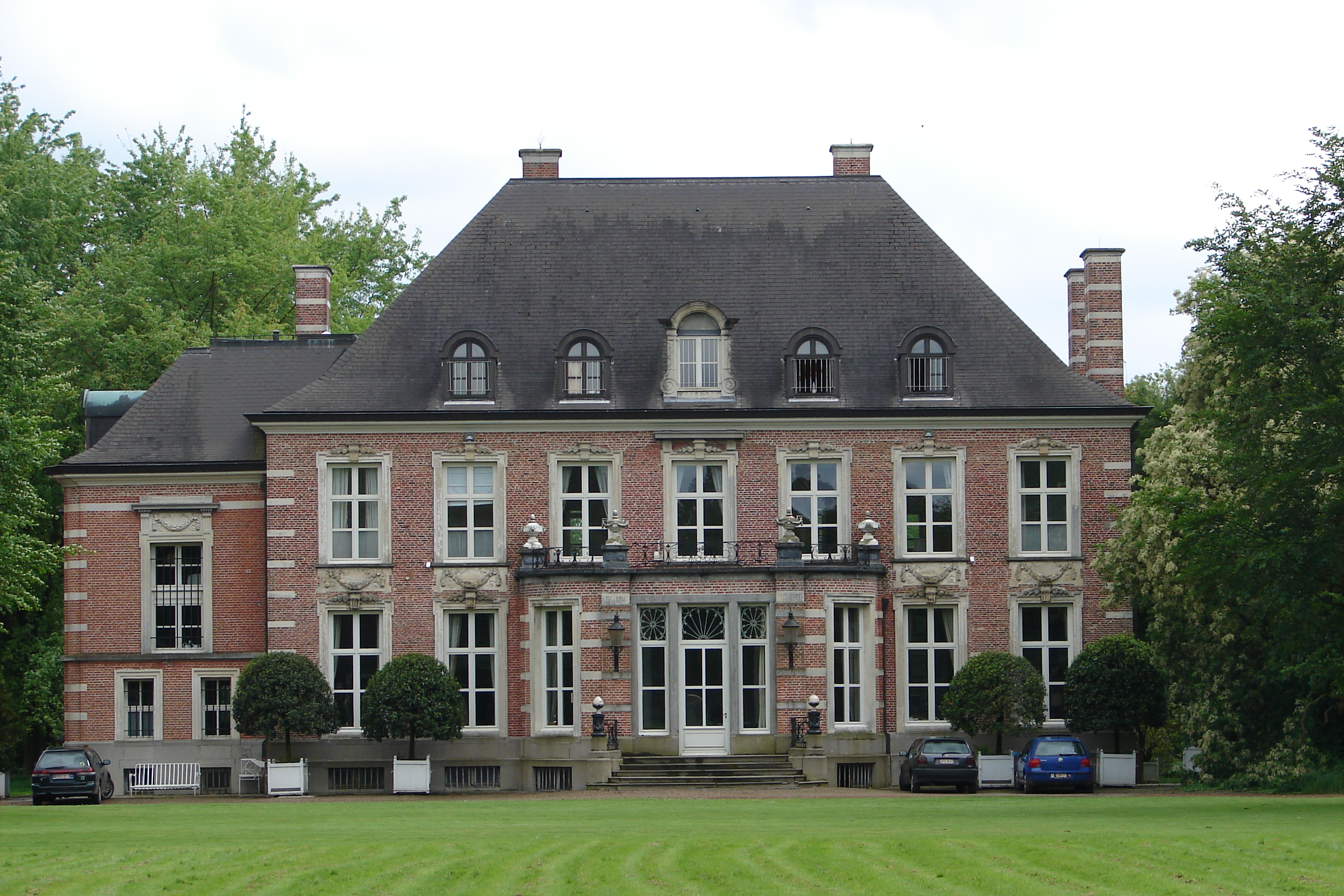
- Hansbeke Castle

- Location in Belgium
- Coordinates: 51.0757°N 3.5344°E
- Country: Belgium
- Province: East Flanders
- Municipality: Deinze

Area
  - Total: 9.89 km^{2} (3.82 sq mi)

Population (2021)
  - Total: 2,107
  - Density: 213/km^{2} (552/sq mi)
- Time zone: CET

Hansbeke is a village and deelgemeente (sub-municipality) in the municipality of Deinze in the Belgian province of East Flanders. The village is located about 13 kilometres (8.1 mi) west of Ghent.

== History ==
The village was first mentioned in 1147 as Hansbeka, and means "brook near Hamme". The parish was demarcated in 1242, and became part of the Diocese of Ghent in 1559. In 1838, a railway station opened on the Ghent to Bruges railway line. Later the E40 highway was constructed parallel to the railway line. The improved connection to the outside world resulted in the transformation of an agricultural community into a commuters' town.

Hansbeke was an independent municipality until 1977, when it was merged into Nevele. In 2019, it was merged into Deinze. The villagers have established their own village council in December 2019, because they were worried that they were being ignored by the city in the larger municipality.

== Buildings ==
The St Peter and Paul Church was first mentioned in 1147. The old church was damaged by a storm in 1780, and demolished in 1790. In 1793, a three aisled basilica-like church was constructed. The tower was destroyed in 1918, and rebuilt between 1922 and 1923 by Valentin Vaerwyck in neo-Flemish Renaissance style.

== Notable people ==
- Erwin Mortier (born 1965), author
- Julius Nieuwland (1899–1985), priest and professor of chemistry and botany

== Gallery ==
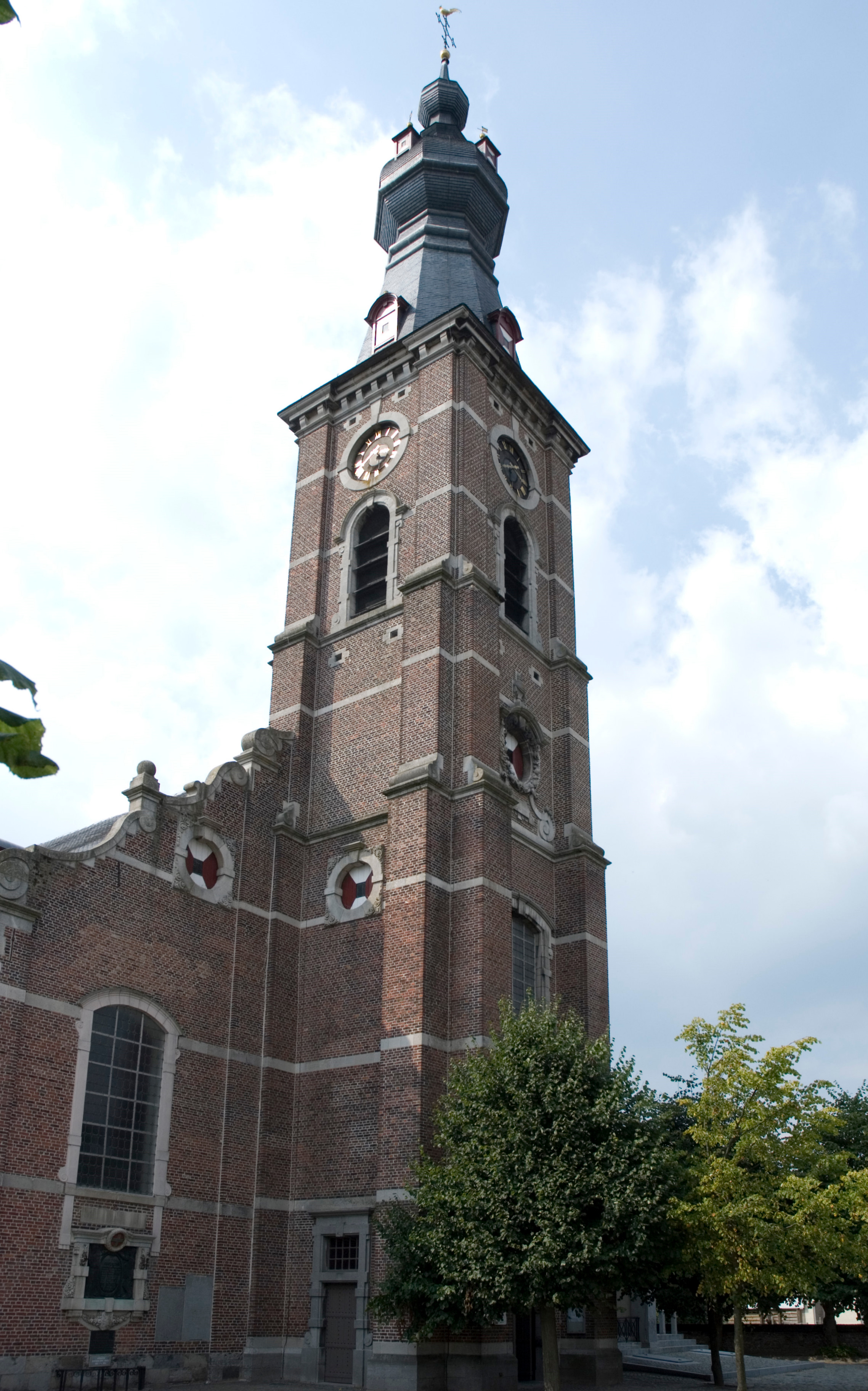
St Peter and Paul Church

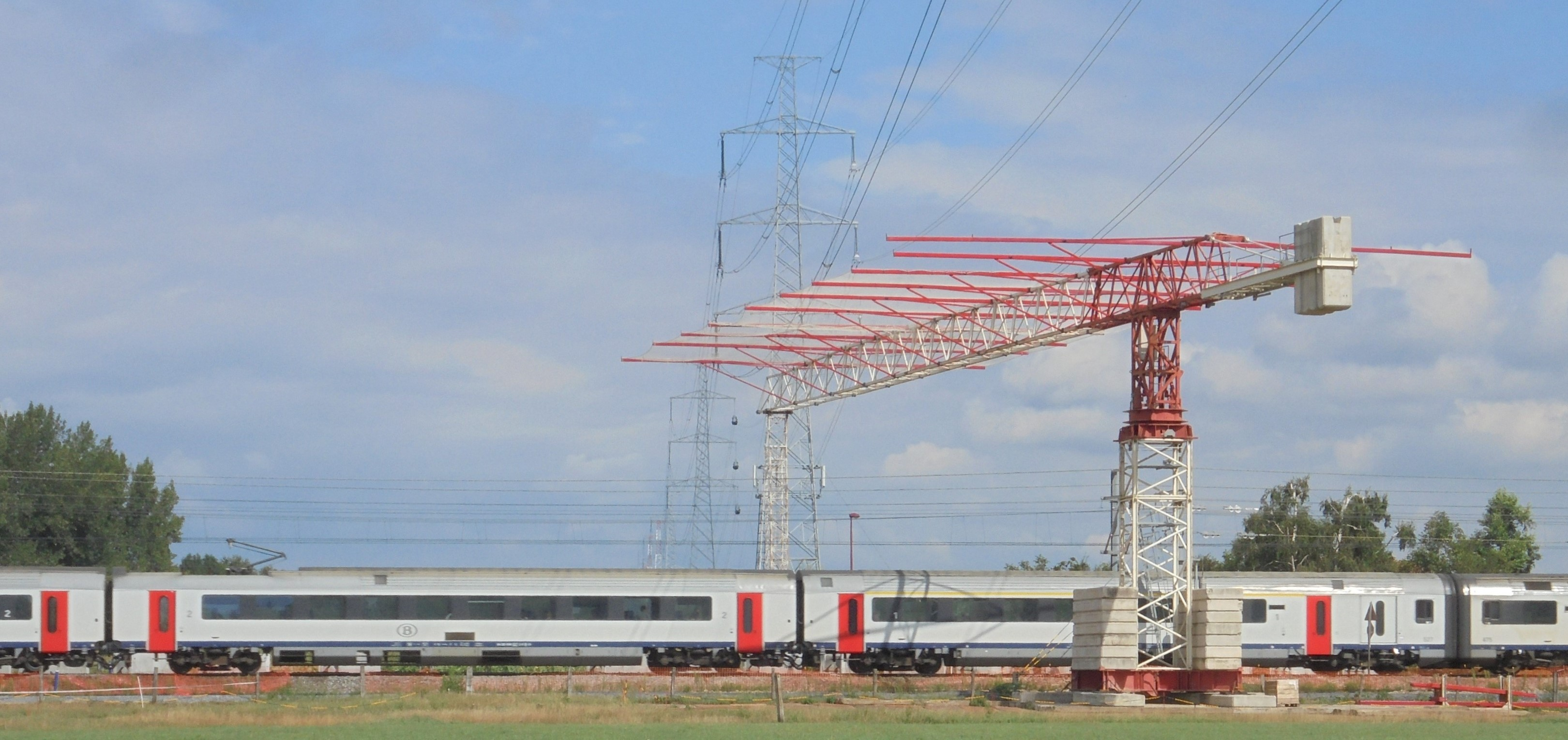
Railway line protection during work on the transmission towers

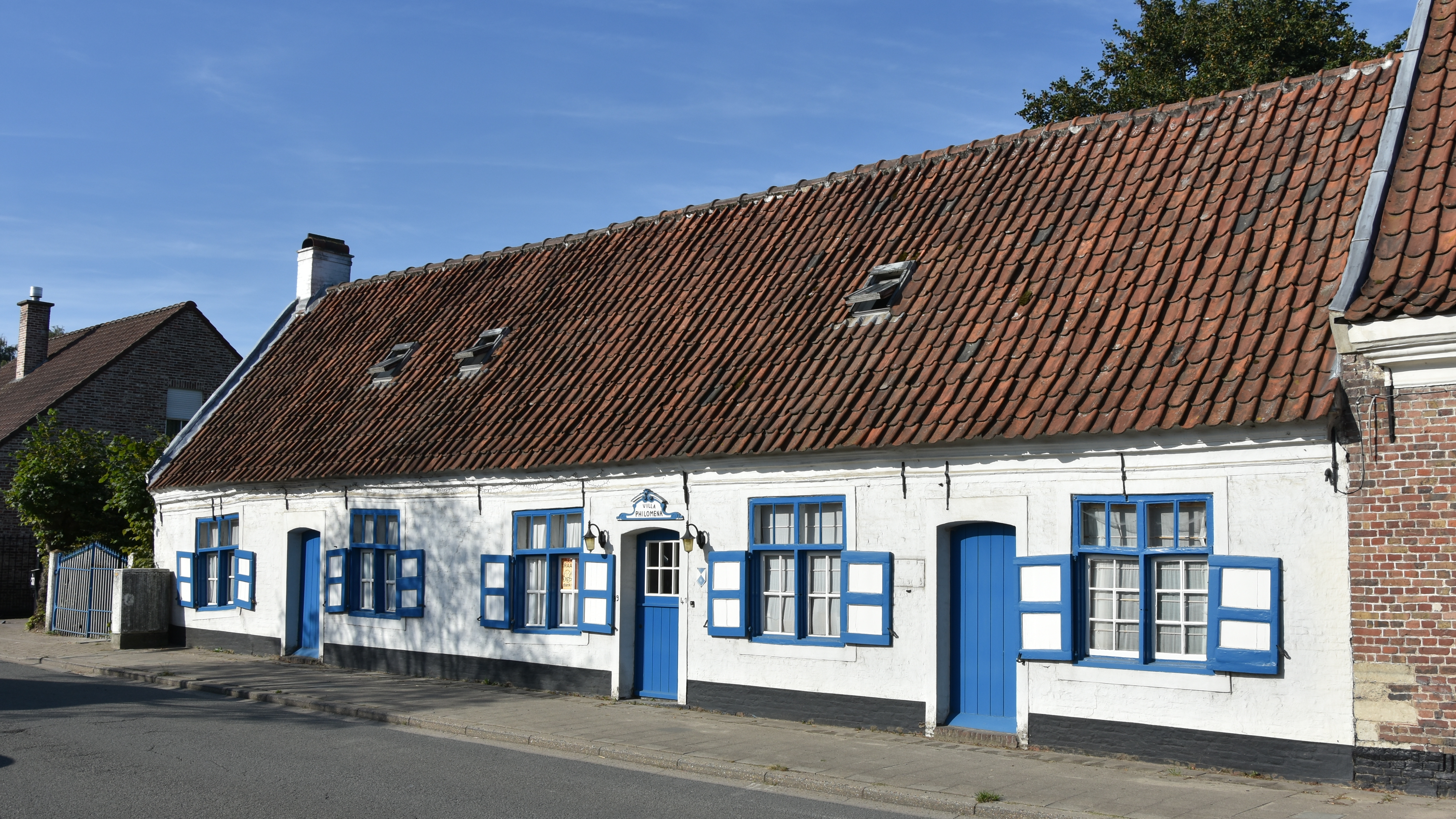
House in Hansbeke

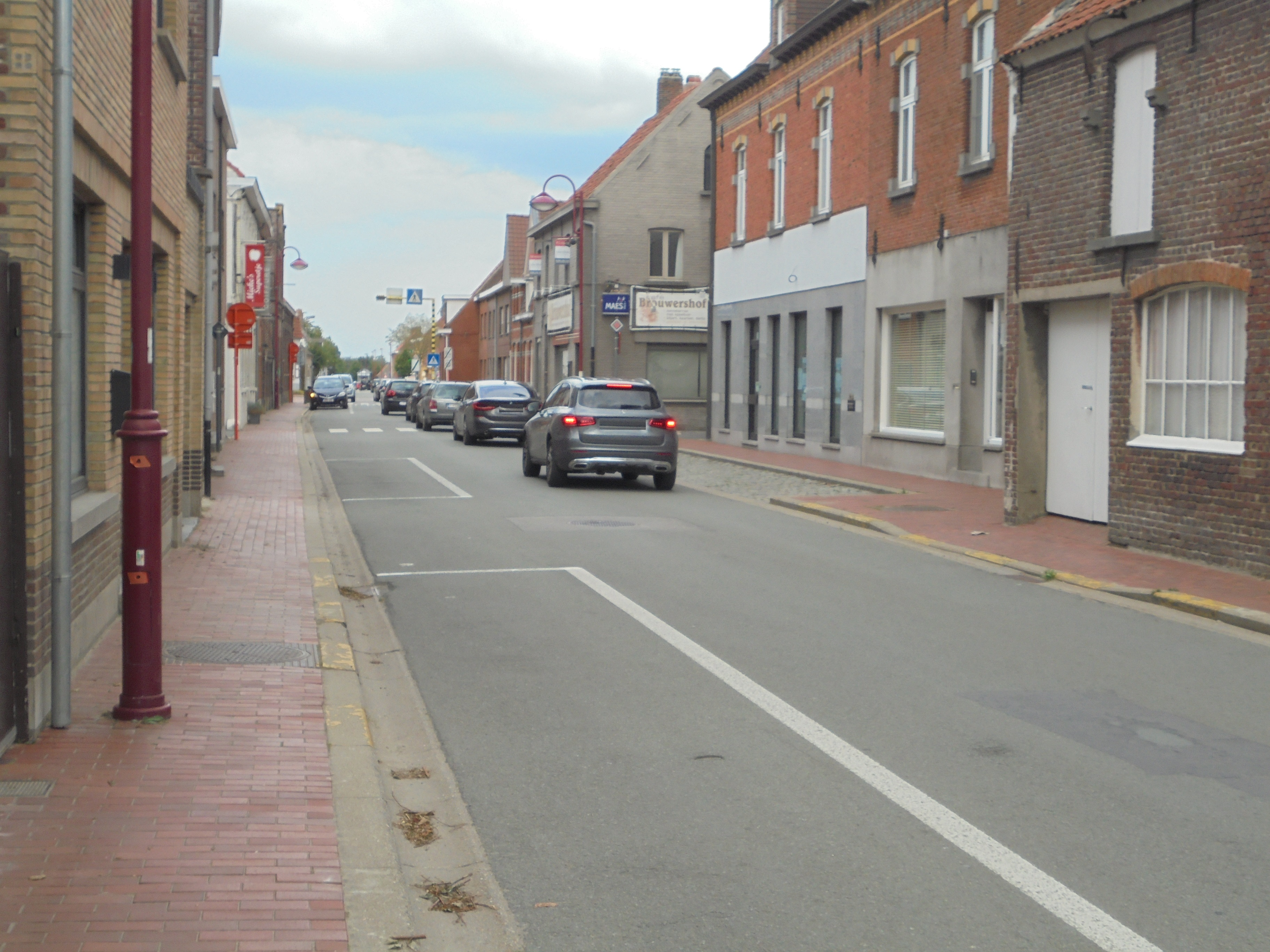
Street view
