= Monika van Paemel =

Belgian writer

Baroness Monika van Paemel
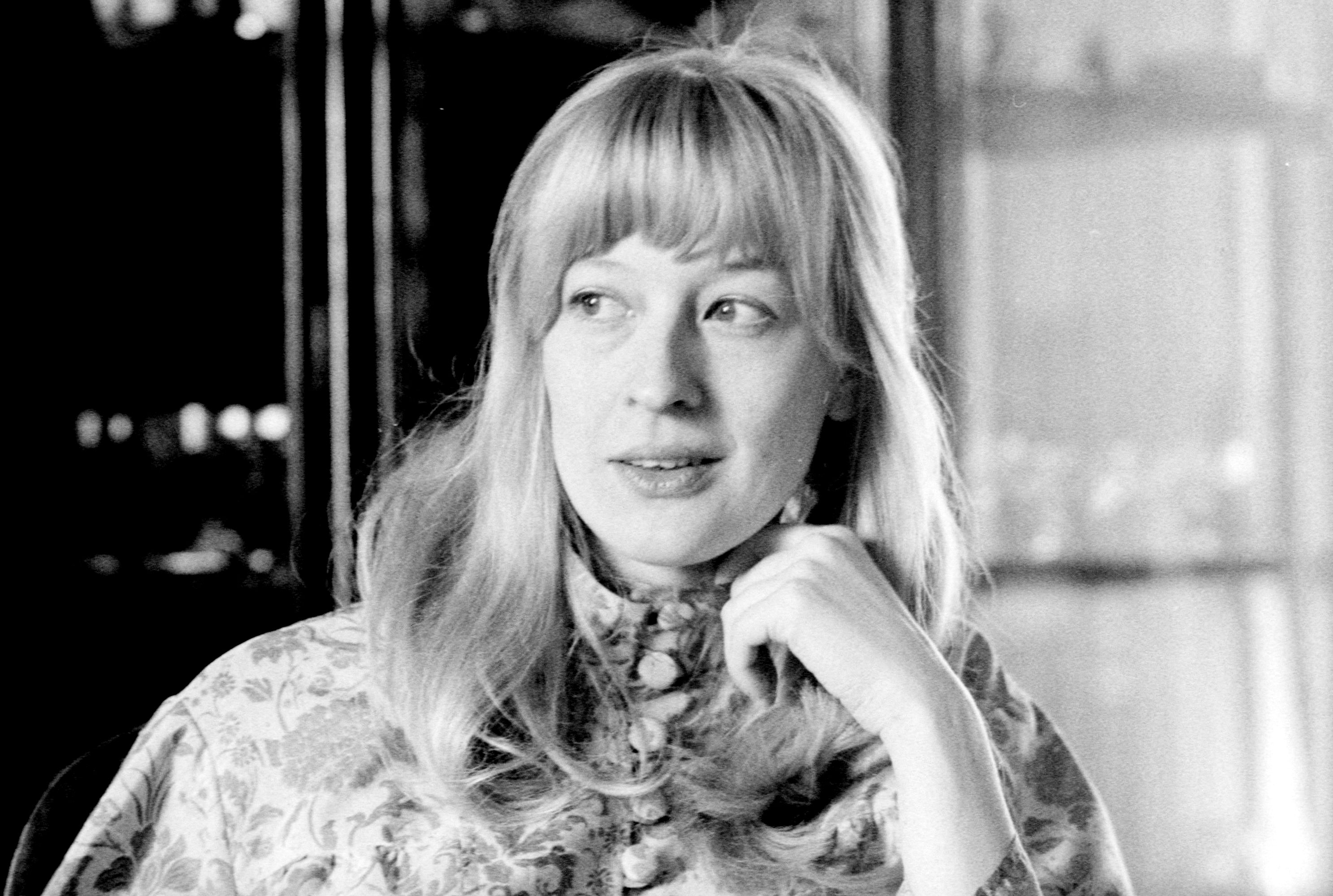
- Monika van Paemel, 1978
- Born: 4 May 1945 (age 81); Poesele, Belgium
- Occupation: writer

Monika, Baroness van Paemel (born 4 May 1945) is a Belgian writer. Born in Poesele, at age 14 she attended the Heilig Graf boarding school in Turnhout, where she graduated in commercial sciences. In 1963, she married Theo Butsen, whom she divorced some years later. Together they had two daughters, but one of them died aged seventeen.

On 16 July 1993, she was knighted and became a baroness.

== Bibliography ==
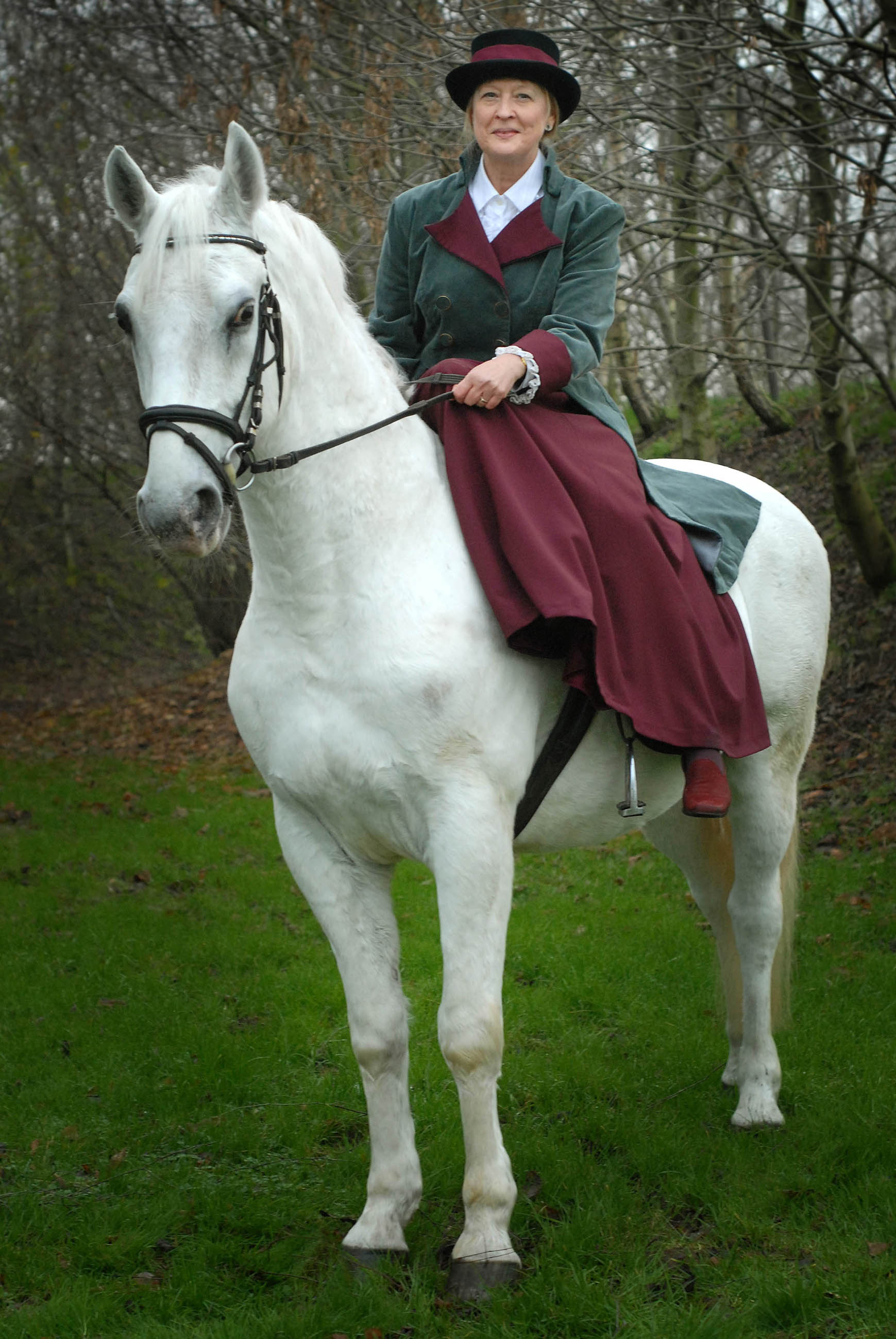
Monika van Paemel, 2006

- Amazone met het blauwe voorhoofd (1971)
- De confrontatie (1974)
- Marguerite (1976)
- De vermaledijde vaders (1985)
- De eerste steen (1988)
- Het wedervaren (1993)
- Rozen op ijs (1997)
- Het verschil (2000)
- Celestien, de gebenedijde moeders(2004)
- Te zot of te bot (2006)
- De koningin van Sheba (2008)
- Het gezin van Puynbroeckx (2008)
- Weduwenspek (2013)

== Awards ==
- 1972 - Prijs voor het beste literair debuut
- 1973 - Literaire prijs voor letterkunde Oost-Vlaanderen
- 1986 - Dirk Martens prijs
- 1986 - Prijs van de Vlaamse provincies

== See also ==
- Flemish literature
