= Julius Nieuwland =

Belgian-born Holy Cross priest and professor of chemistry and botany

The Reverend Julius Aloysius Arthur Nieuwland CSC
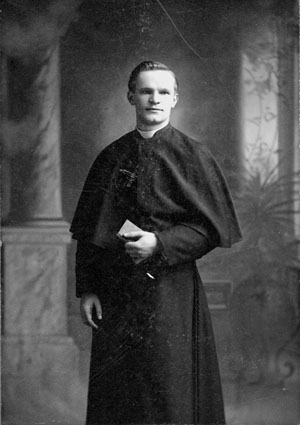
- Young Julius Nieuwland

Orders
- Ordination: 1903

Personal details
- Born: 14 February 1878 Hansbeke, Belgium
- Died: 11 June 1936 (aged 58) Indiana, United States of America
- Buried: Cedar Grove Cemetery near Notre Dame
- Education: University of Notre Dame, The Catholic University of America

Julius Aloysius Arthur Nieuwland, CSC, (14 February 1878 – 11 June 1936) was a Belgian-born Holy Cross priest and professor of chemistry and botany at the University of Notre Dame, Indiana. He is known for his contributions to acetylene research and its use as the basis for one type of synthetic rubber, which eventually led to the invention of neoprene by DuPont.

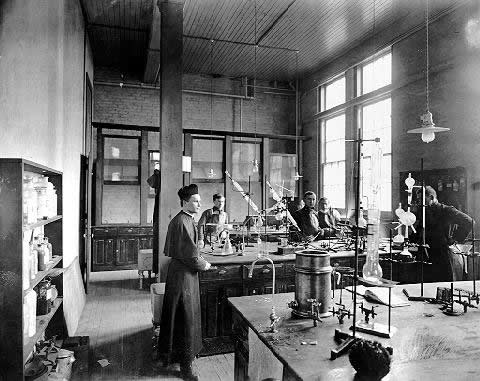
Fr. Julius Nieuwland in his laboratory

== Life and work ==
Nieuwland's parents emigrated from Hansbeke, Belgium in 1880 to South Bend, Indiana, when Nieuwland was 2. As a young man, Nieuwland enrolled at the University of Notre Dame, where he studied Latin and Greek and received his undergraduate degree in 1899. He soon after began studies for the priesthood. Ordained in 1903, Nieuwland attended graduate school at The Catholic University of America, where he studied botany and chemistry.

During his doctoral studies into the chemistry of acetylene, he discovered the chemical compound lewisite, which would later gain fame as a chemical warfare agent. Nieuwland had to be hospitalized for several days after his exposure to the newly synthesized compound; he did not purify it or otherwise pursue the matter any further.

After receiving his PhD in 1904, Nieuwland returned to Notre Dame as professor of botany until 1918, and subsequently as professor of organic chemistry until 1936. In 1909, Nieuwland founded the peer-reviewed journal American Midland Naturalist acting as its editor until 1934. In 1920, he successfully polymerized acetylene into divinylacetylene. Elmer Bolton, the Director of Research at DuPont, used this basic research during the development of neoprene.

Nieuwland died at the age of 58, and was buried at the Community Cemetery near Notre Dame.

Among Nieuwland's more famous students was Knute Rockne, who became a celebrated Notre Dame football coach. Rockne graduated from Notre Dame with a degree in pharmacy in 1914 and became a chemistry instructor at Notre Dame, while also coaching various sports on campus, from 1915 to 1922.

== Honors and awards ==
- Morehead Medal from the International Acetylene Association (1932)
- President of the Indiana Academy of Sciences
- American Institute of Chemists Gold Medal (1935)
- Nichols medal (1935) for "Basic Work on Synthesis from Unsaturated Hydrocarbons"
- Mendel Medal from Villanova University (1936)
- The standard author abbreviation Nieuwl. is used to indicate this individual as the author when citing a botanical name.
- Inducted into the National Inventors Hall of Fame in 1996, Father Nieuwland is notably the only Catholic priest to receive this honor.

== See also ==
- List of Roman Catholic scientist-clerics
- List of National Inventors Hall of Fame inductees
