= Leopold Canal (Belgium) =

Coordinates: 51.264466°N 3.638363°E

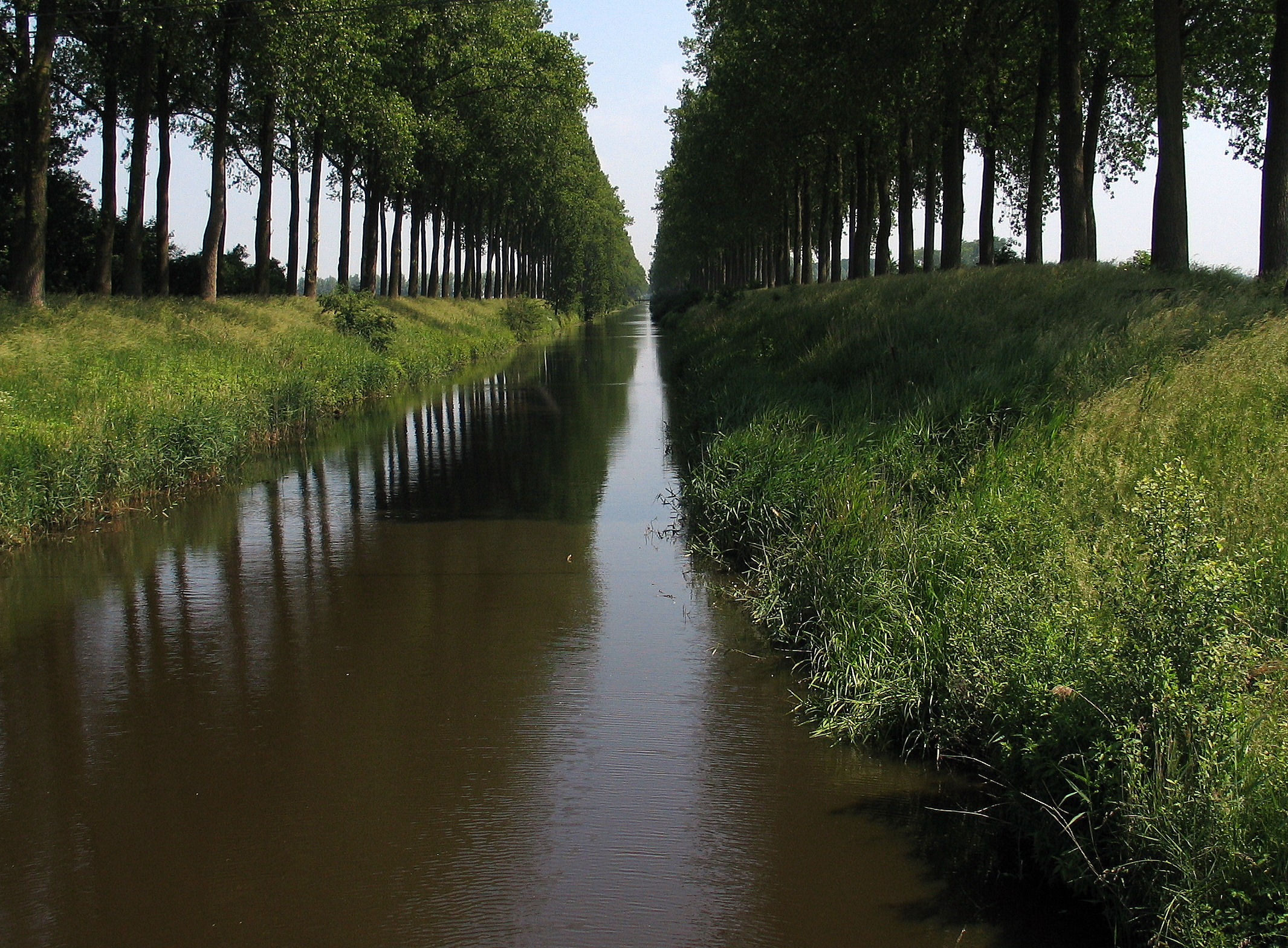
- The Leopold Canal in Sint-Laureins

Specifications
- Length: 46 km (29 mi)
- Status: Open

History
- Construction began: 1847
- Date completed: 1850

Geography
- Start point: west of Zelzate
- End point: North Sea

The Leopold Canal (Dutch: Leopoldkanaal or Leopoldvaart, French: Canal Léopold) is a canal in northern Belgium. Construction occurred between 1847 and 1850 after the Belgian government granted permission in 1846. It runs about 40 km (25 mi) westward from Boekhoute to Heist-aan-Zee just south of the Dutch border. It is between 1.2 and 2.3 m (3 ft 11 in and 7 ft 7 in) deep. The canal was proposed by Canon Joseph Andries, local member of the Belgian National Congress, to prevent the Dutch from blocking the discharge of water and inundating the Meetjesland after Belgium's independence from the Netherlands.

This canal was a major line of German resistance during the Battle of the Scheldt in World War II. The German forces defended the canal against the 3rd Canadian Division in September and October 1944.

== See also ==
- Ghent–Terneuzen Canal
- Braakman
