= Heist-aan-Zee =

Coordinates: 51°21′N 3°15′E

Heist-aan-Zee, Heist or Heyst, is a town (formerly a municipality, until 1971) in Knokke-Heist, West Flanders, Belgium.

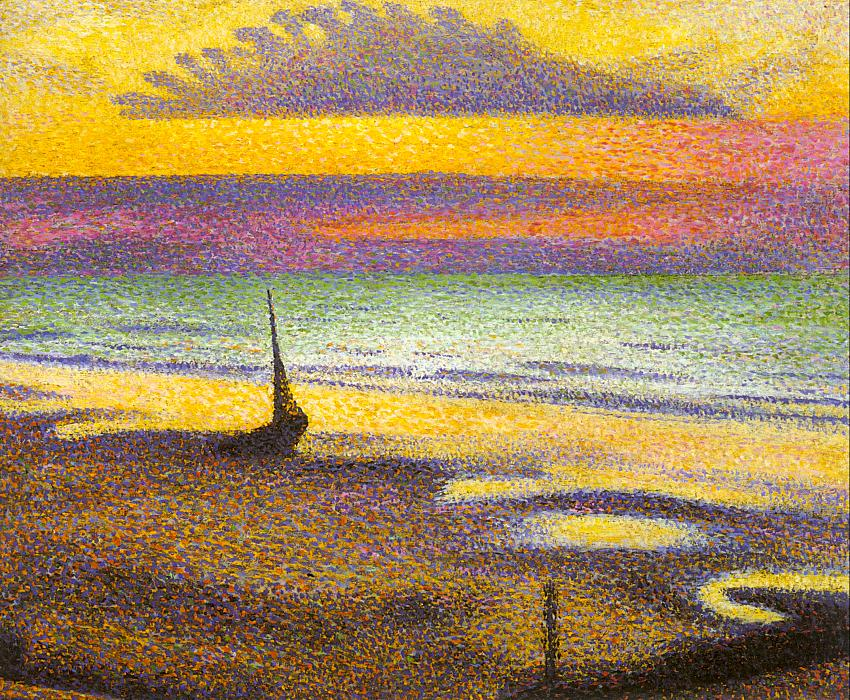
Georges Lemmen, Beach at Heist, 1892

It was a prominent summer beach resort in the 1890s.

It had a beachfront lined with hotels and a "dike" paved walkway on a storm fender. Fishing boats were moored on the beach, and one could purchase a ticket to bathe in the sea.
