= Schipdonk Canal =

Canal in Belgium

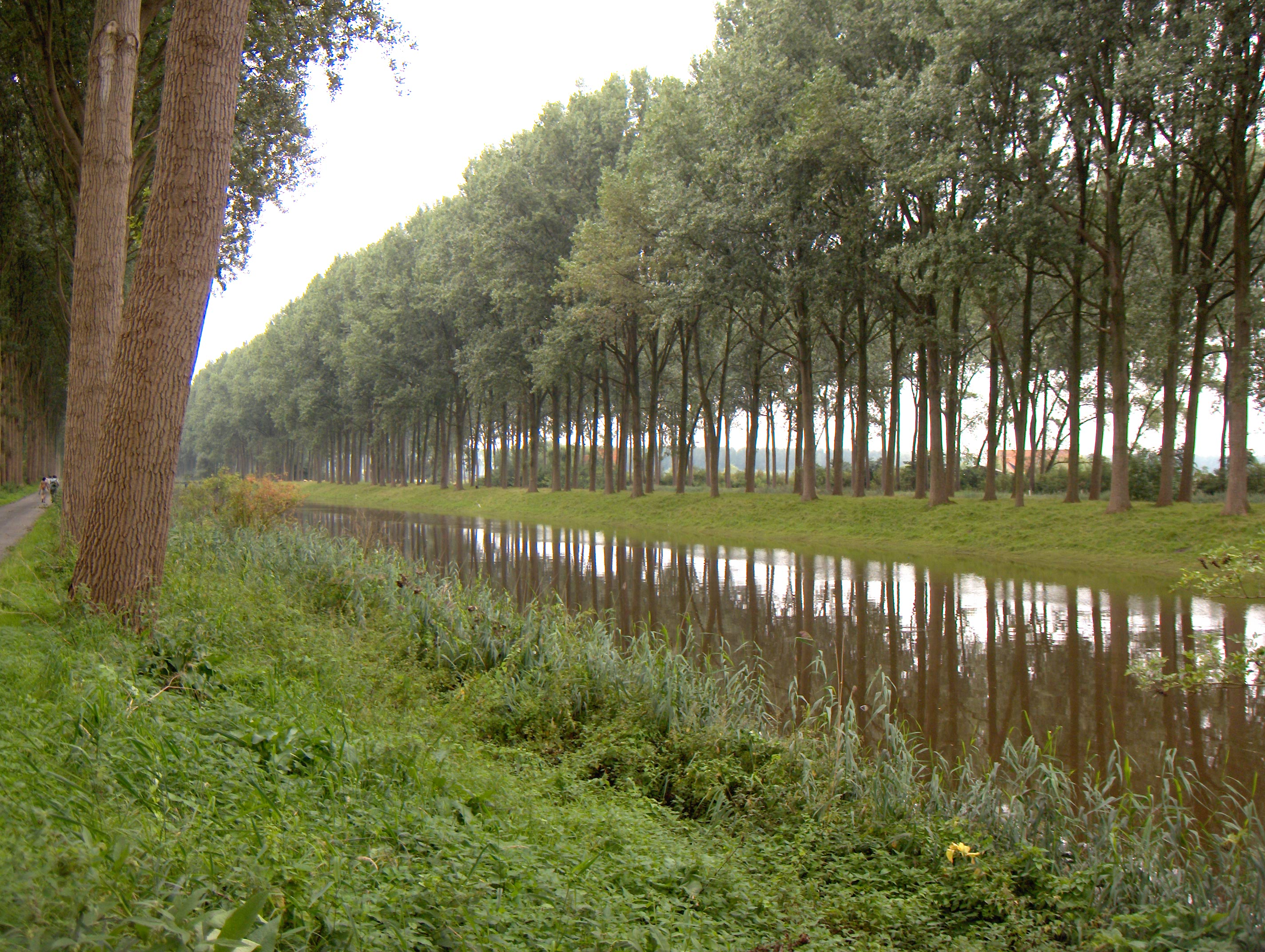
- The canal near Damme
- Country: Belgium

Specifications
- Length: 56 km (35 miles)

Geography
- Direction: Northwest
- Start point: Leie River
- End point: North Sea
- Beginning coordinates: 50°58′49″N 3°30′43″E
- Ending coordinates: 51°20′23″N 3°13′04″E

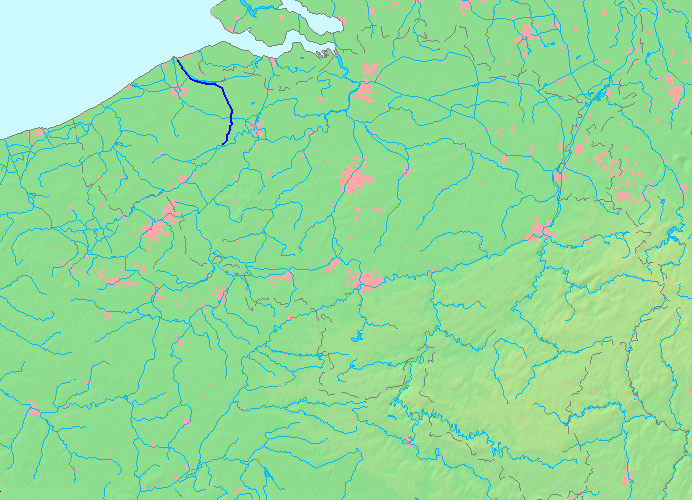
Location of the Schipdonk Canal in Belgium

The Schipdonk Canal (French: Canal de Schipdonk or Dérivation de la Lys; Dutch: Schipdonkkanaal or Afleidingskanaal van de Leie) is a canal in the Belgian provinces of East Flanders and West Flanders. With a length of 56 km (35 mi), the canal runs in a northerly direction from Deinze, turning to a north-western direction roughly halfway along its route to the North Sea with which it meets on the coast near to Heist. It crosses both the Ghent-Bruges Canal and for its final 20 km (12 mi) runs parallel with the Leopold Canal as it approaches the north Belgian coast. For most of this final section the two canals are separated only by a dyke.

== History ==
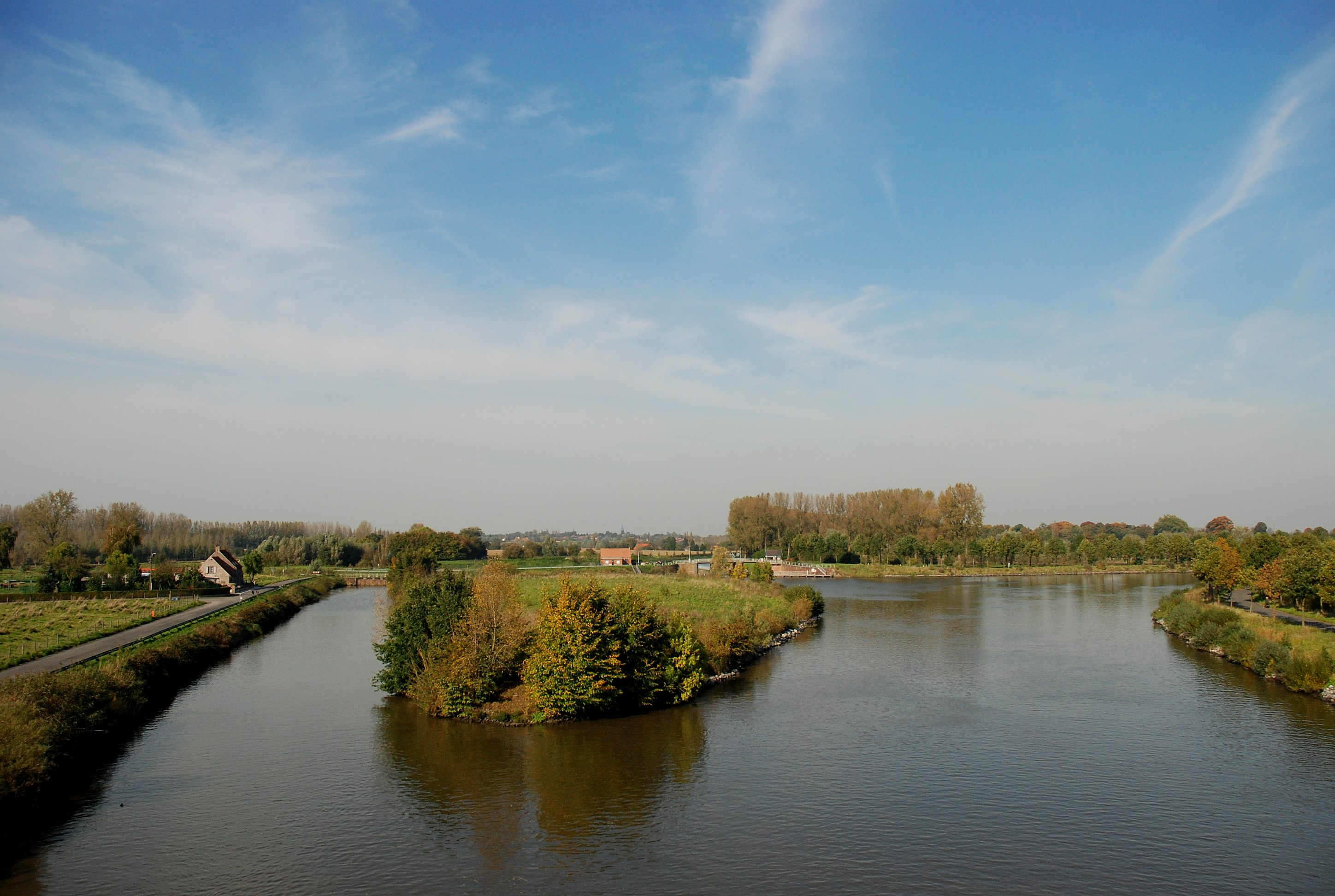
An island in the Schipdonk Canal

The digging of this canal took place between 1846 and 1860. Along with the Leopold Canal it was one of the first major infrastructure projects of the newly independent Belgium.

In the middle part of the nineteenth century the economy of the Kortrijk region was dominated by the textile industry, with an emphasis on linen. This industry heavily polluted the Lys River. In order to divert the polluted water from the centre of Ghent, it was decided to cut the Schipdonk Canal which transported the pollution more directly to the North Sea, avoiding Ghent in the process. A further benefit from the canal involved protecting Ghent against the periodic flooding to which it had been subject. The third significant benefit was that the canal provided a relatively direct route for water transport from the industrially active Kortrijk district to the North Sea.

== Nomenclature ==
The Schipdonk Canal is sometimes known as De Stinker ("the stinker") because of its traditionally polluted condition. This also contrasts with the condition of the Leopold Canal, sometimes known as De Blinker ("the shiner" or "the shining one"), recalling its relatively clear water.

== Recreation ==
Over virtually the full length of the canal the paths beside it are maintained as cycle paths. Together with the Ghent-Bruges Canal, the Schipdonk Canal is also used for recreational boat trips.
