= Deinze =

- City and municipality
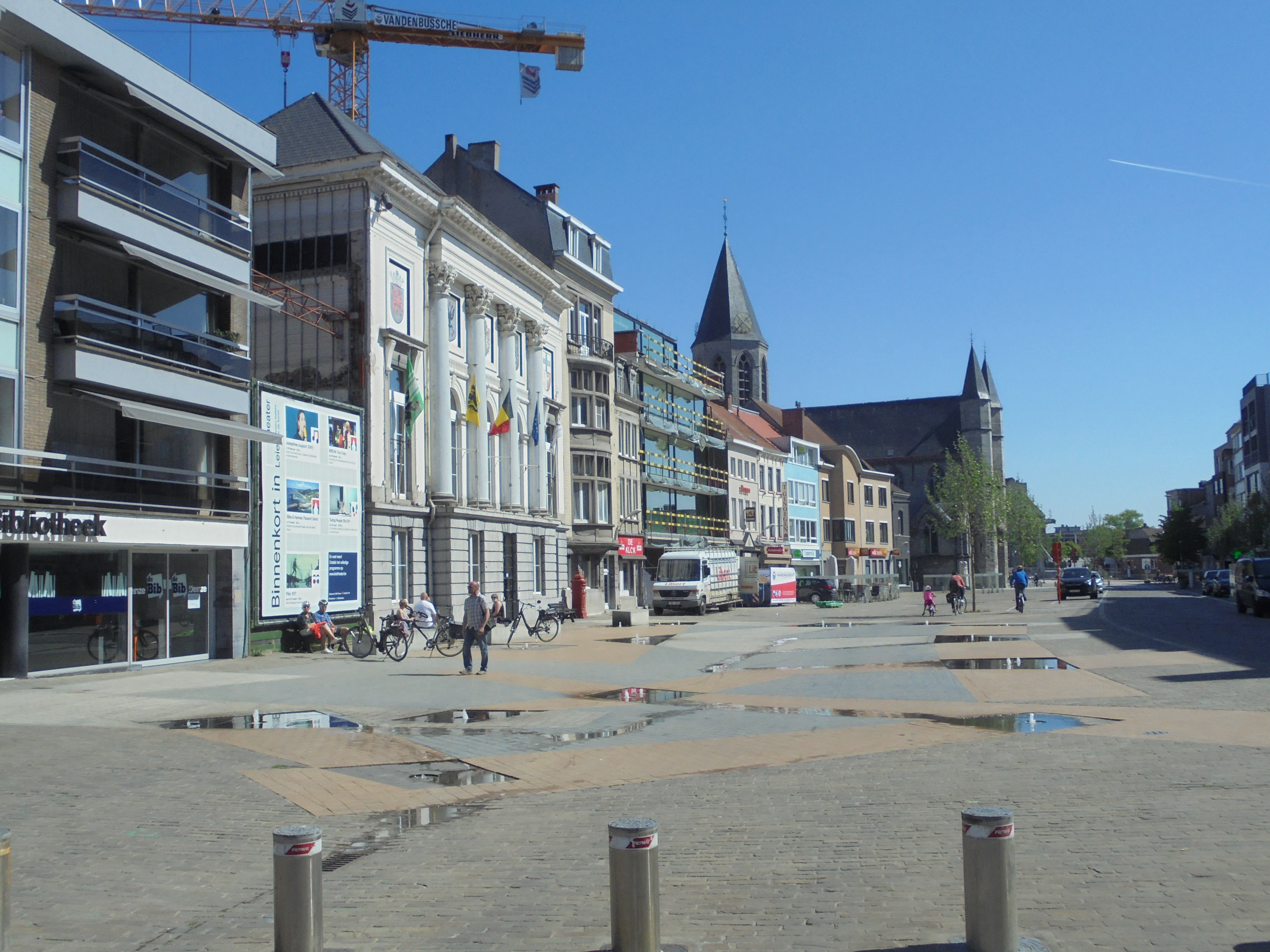
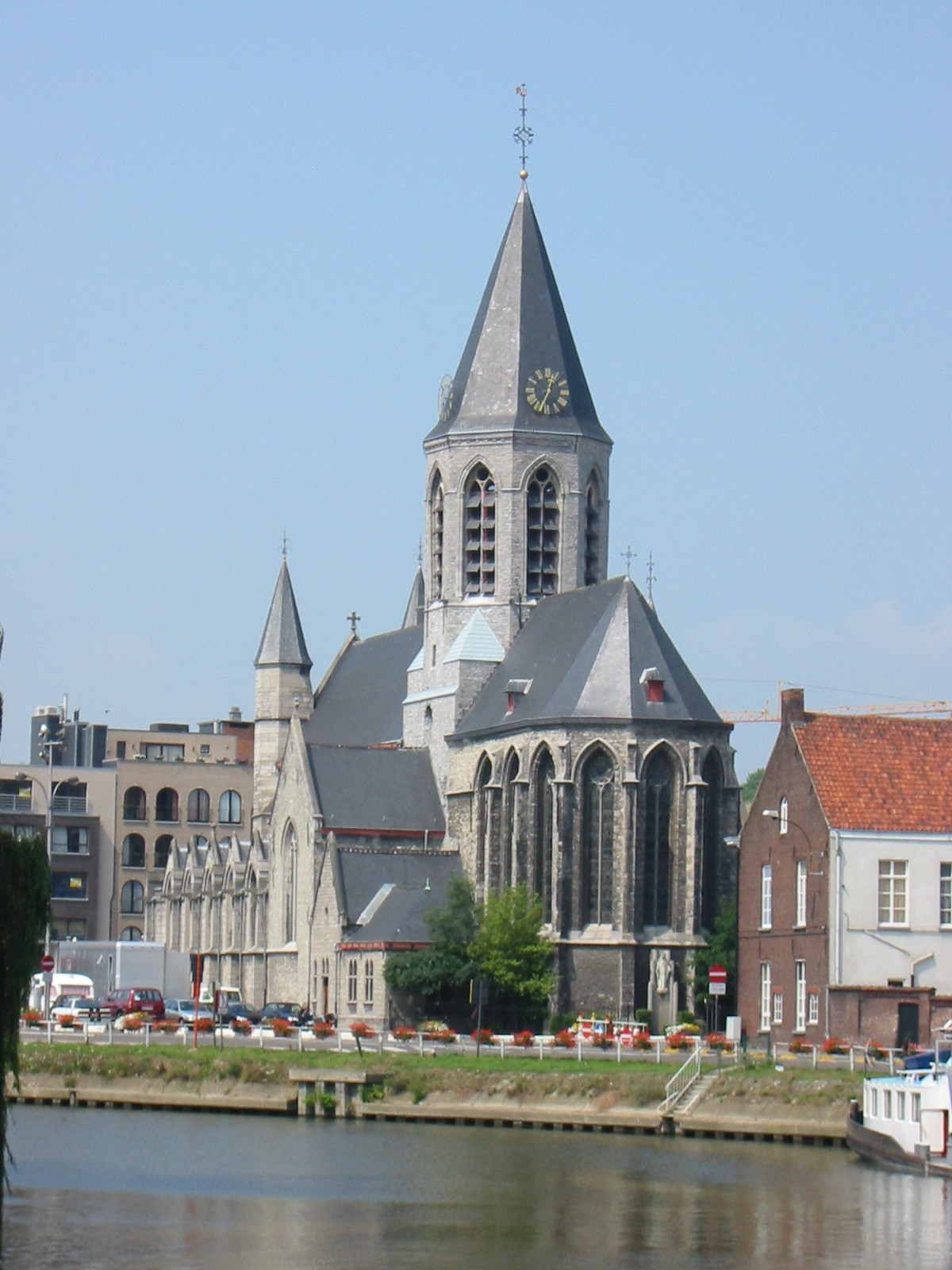
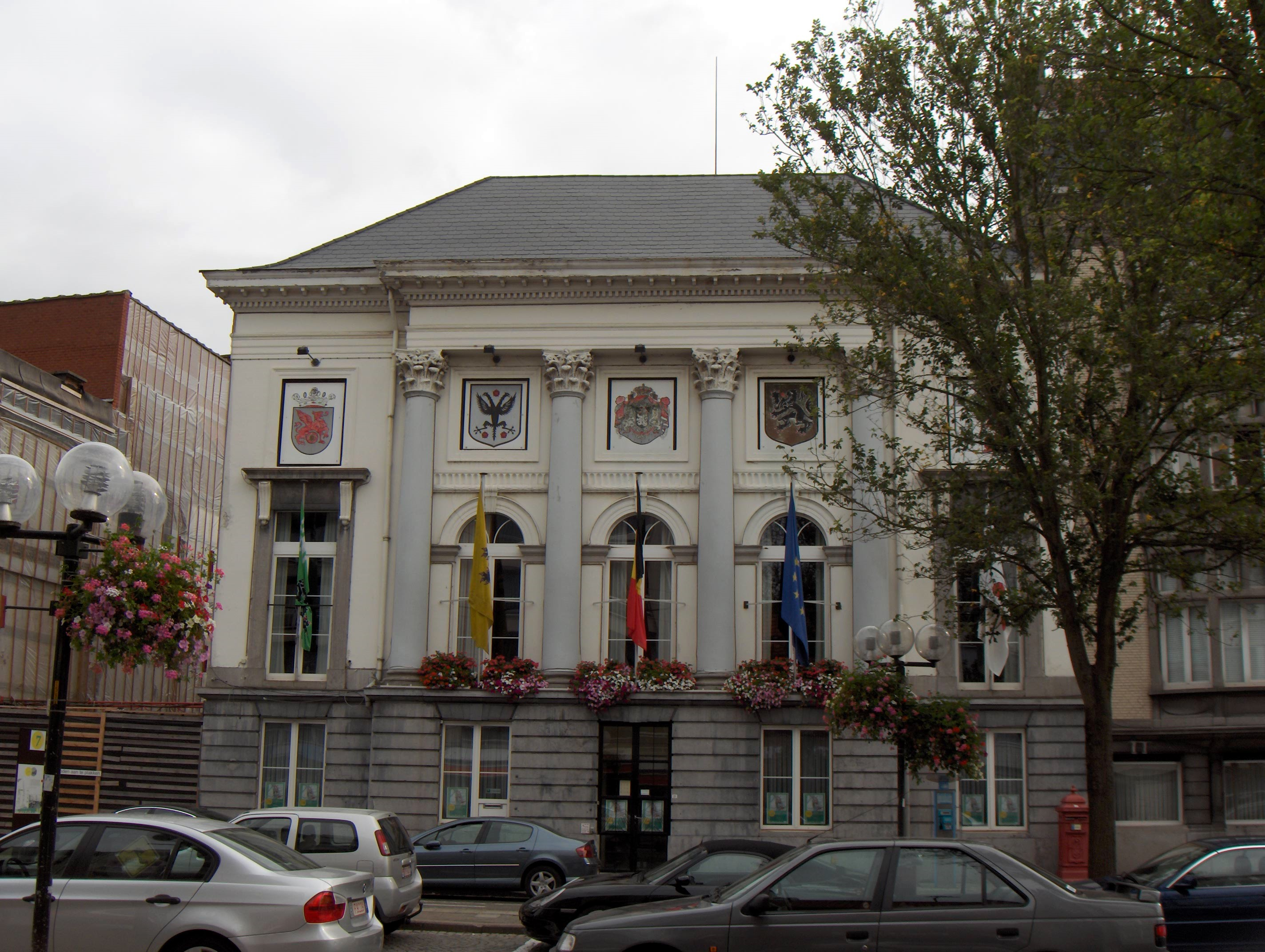
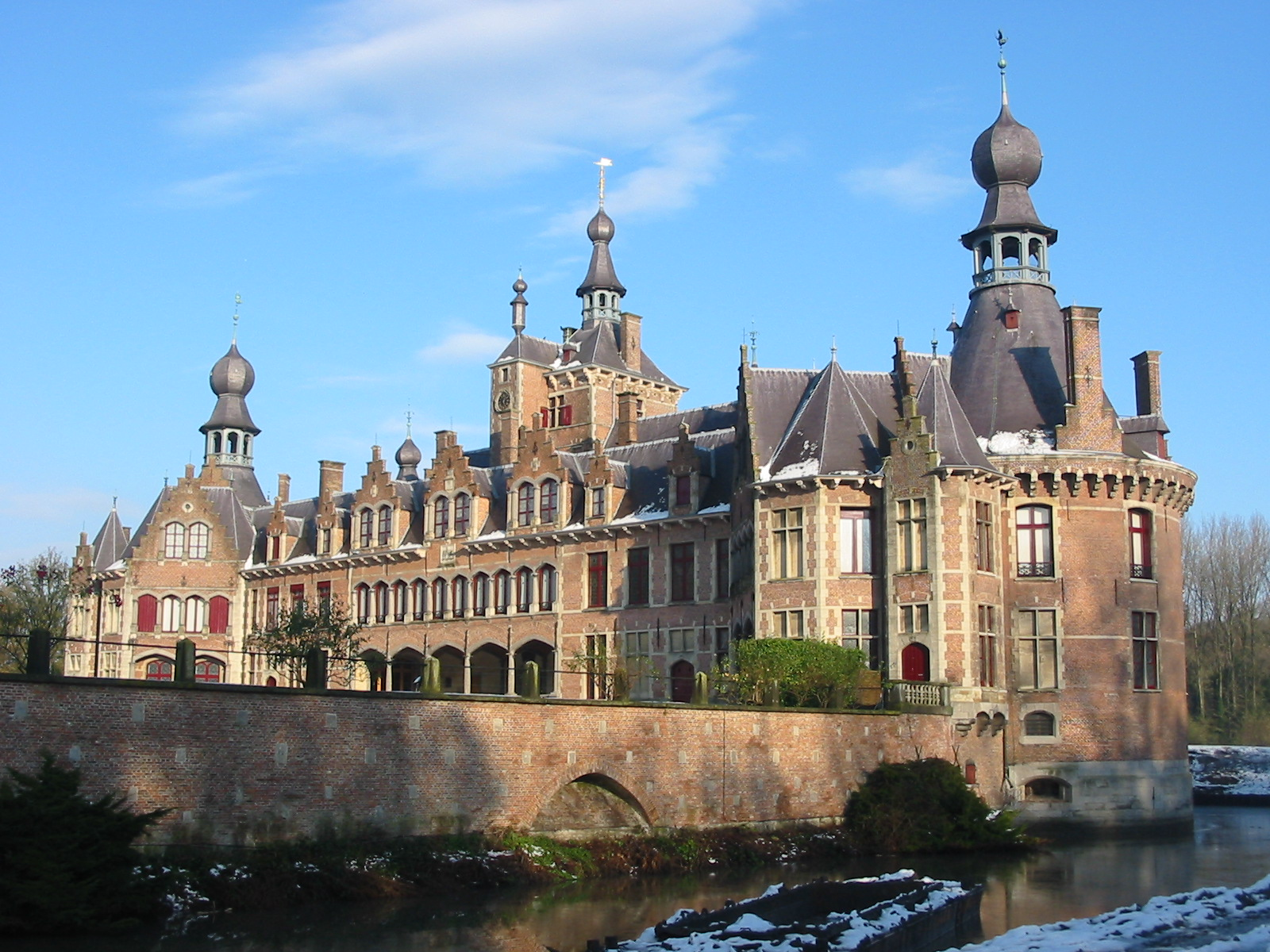
- Clockwise from top: Marketplace, Onze-Lieve-Vrouwekerk, Old City Hall, Ooidonk Castle

- Flag Coat of arms

- Location of Deinze in East Flanders
- Interactive map of Deinze
- Location in Belgium
- Coordinates: 50°59′N 03°32′E
- Country: Belgium
- Community: Flemish Community
- Region: Flemish Region
- Province: East Flanders
- Arrondissement: Ghent

Government
  - Mayor: Rutger De Reu (CD&V)
  - Governing parties: CD&V, Open Deinze

Area
  - Total: 128.03 km^{2} (49.43 sq mi)

Population (2022-01-01)
  - Total: 44,315
  - Density: 346.13/km^{2} (896.47/sq mi)
- Postal codes: 9800
- NIS code: 44083
- Area codes: 09
- Website: www.deinze.be

Deinze (Dutch pronunciation: [ˈdɛinzə]) is a city and a municipality in the Belgian province of East Flanders. It comprises the city of Deinze, and the towns of Astene, Bachte-Maria-Leerne, Gottem, Grammene, Hansbeke, Landegem, Meigem, Merendree, Nevele, Petegem-aan-de-Leie, Poesele, Sint-Martens-Leerne, Vinkt, Vosselare, Wontergem, and Zeveren. On 1 January 2025, Deinze had a population of 46,026. The municipality's total area is 128.03 km^{2} (49 sq mi), giving a population density of 359 inhabitants per km^{2}.

On 1 January 2019, the municipality of Nevele was merged into Deinze.

== History ==
In 1695, during the Nine Years' War, an English force garrisoned in the town under the command of the Irish general Francis Fergus O’Farrell was forced to surrender to French forces.

=== Postal history ===
The DEYNZE post office opened in 1836 with the postal code 31 (before 1864), then 94 prior to 1874. The only other office in the area before 1910 was PETEGHEM (not to be confused with PETEGHEM-LEZ-AUDENAERDE), which opened 1 June 1874.

Postal codes in 1969 (before the merger of municipalities in 1977):

- 9800 Deinze
- 9801 Astene
- 9802 Petegem-aan-de-Leie
- 9803 Gottem
- 9804 Grammene
- 9805 Wontergem
- 9806 Vinkt
- 9807 Zeveren
- 9852 Sint-Martens-Leerne
- 9853 Bachte-Maria-Leerne
- 9854 Meigem

== Sports ==
Deinze is the starting location of the cycling race Gent–Wevelgem. It is also the operational base of the Ineos Grenadiers cycle racing team, formerly Team Sky.

== Places of interest ==
- Museum van Deinze en de Leiestreek, a museum dedicated to arts and folk objects created in the Leie region
- Ooidonk Castle, a castle dating from the 16th century
- Filliers Grain Distillery, a gin distillery

== Famous inhabitants ==
- Dirk van Braeckel, head of design at Bentley Motors
- Karel Justinus Calewaert, Roman Catholic bishop
- Raoul De Keyser, painter
- Rudy Dhaenens, cyclist, World Champion in 1990
- Poppo of Deinze, saint
- Jacques Rogge, former president of the International Olympic Committee
- Charles Felix Van Quickenborne, founder of Saint Louis University in St. Louis, Mo., USA
- Karel Van Wijnendaele, founder of the Tour of Flanders
- Tanneke Sconyncx, alleged witch
- Rose Bertram, fashion model

== Gallery ==
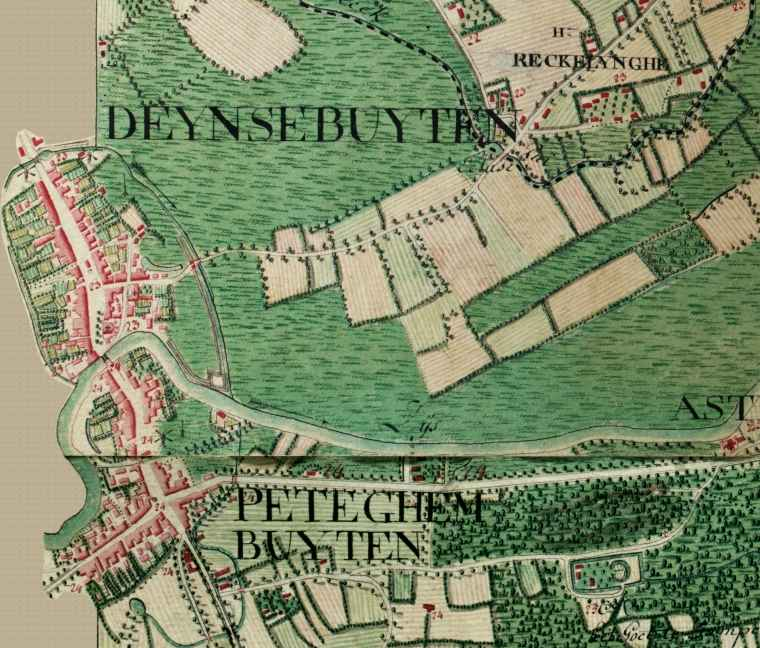
Deinze on the Ferraris map (around 1775)

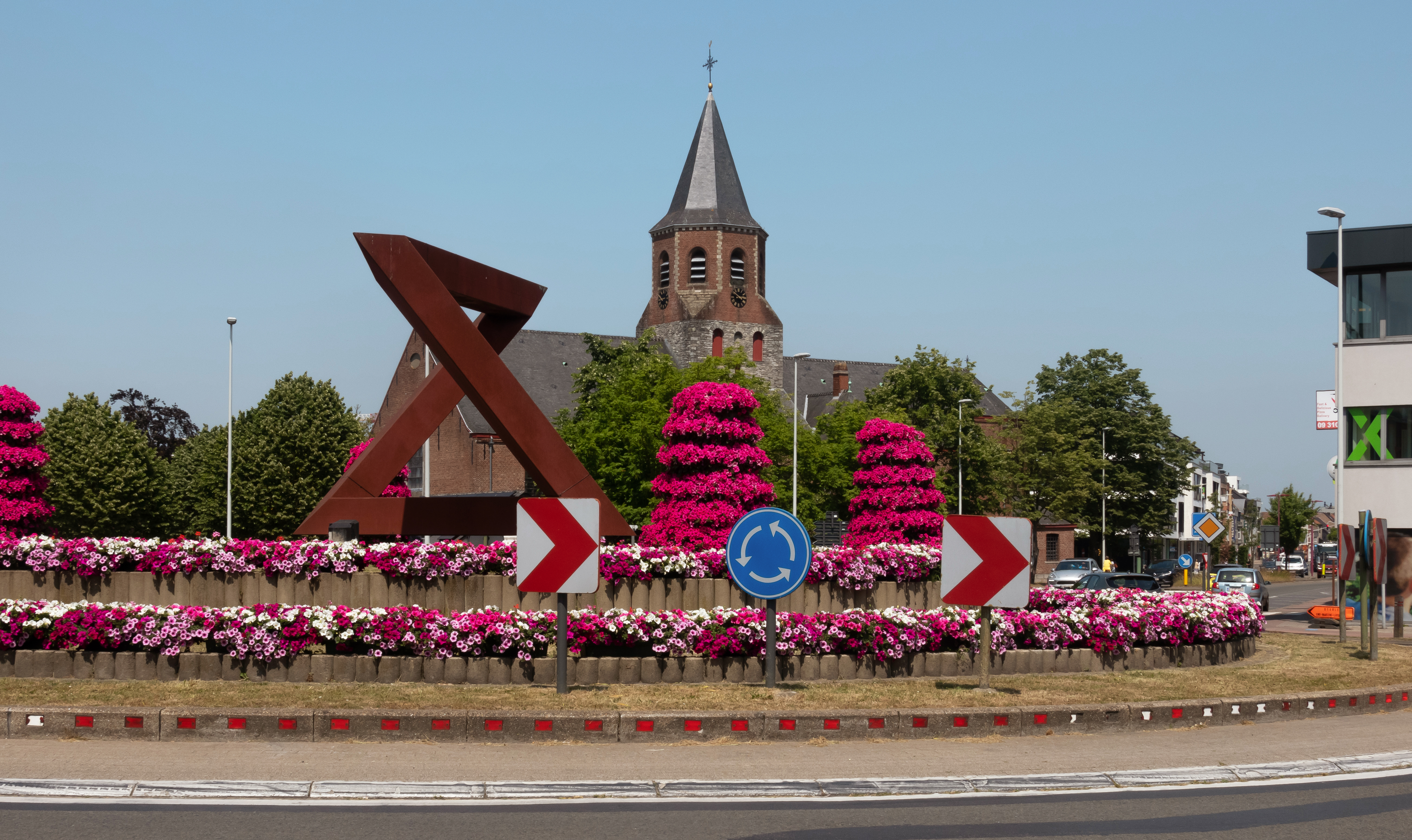
Deinze, church: parochiekerk Sint-Martinus en Sint-Antonius Abt

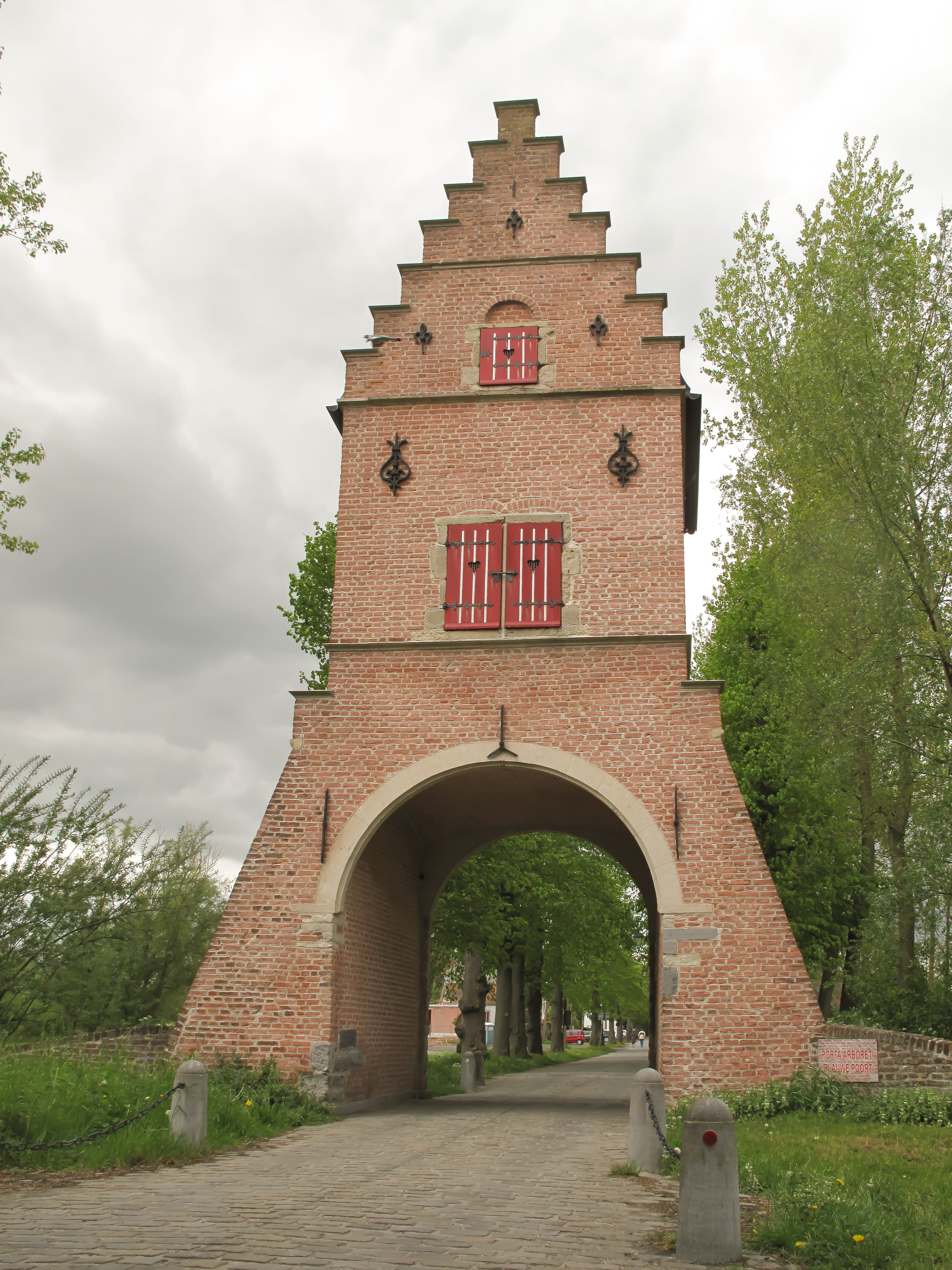
Bachte Maria Leerne, de Blauwe Poort (entrance gate to castle: kasteel van Ooidonk)

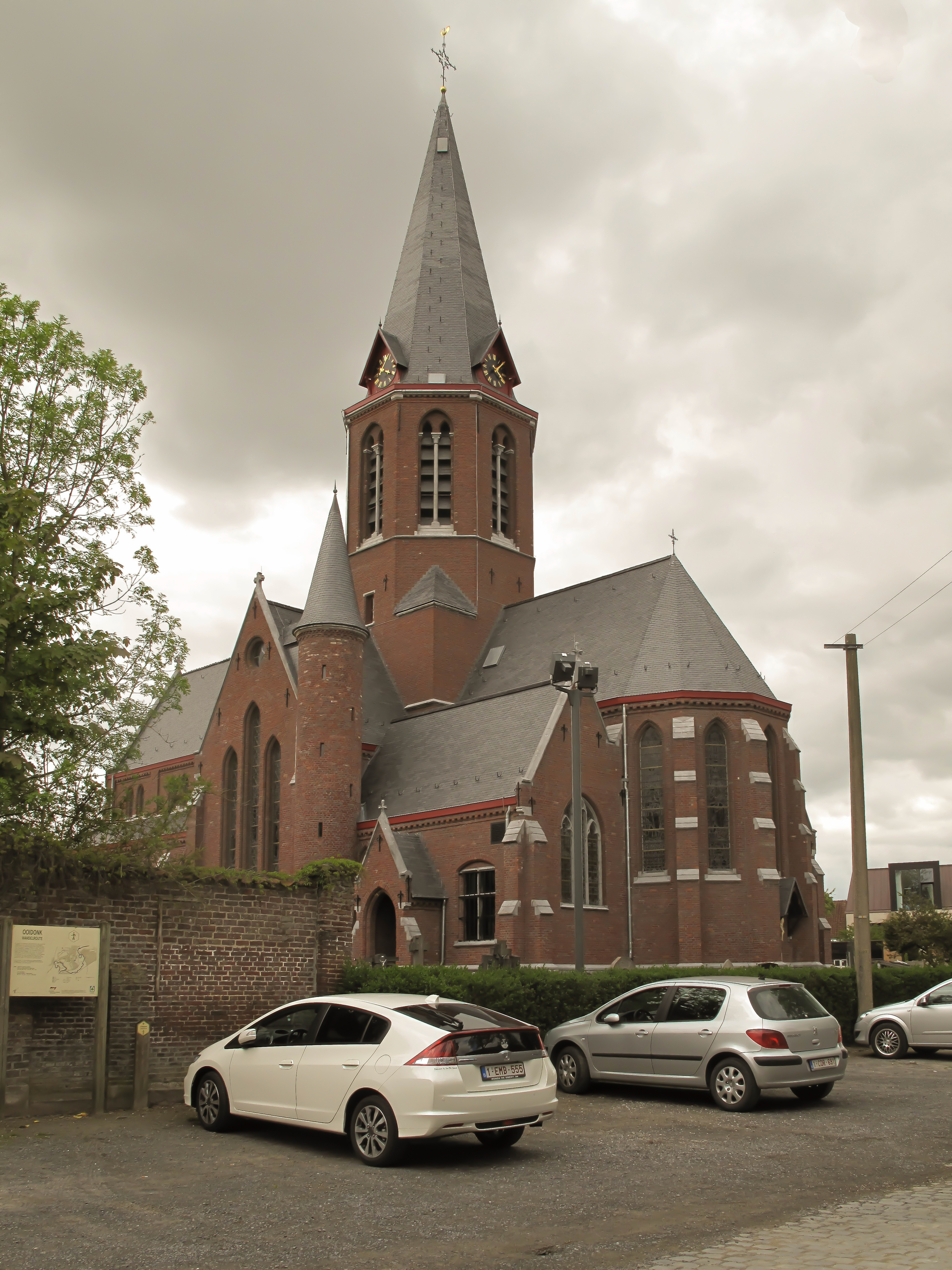
Bachte Maria Leerne, church: de parochiekerk Sint Petrus en Paulus
