= Alfred Van Landeghem =

Belgian coxswain (1891–1914

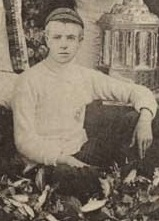
- Van Landeghem at the 1909 Henley Royal Regatta

Personal information
- Born: 26 October 1891
- Died: 19 October 1914 (aged 22)
- Weight: 51 kg (112 lb)

Sport
- Sport: Rowing
- Club: Royal Club Nautique de Gand
Medal record
Men's rowing
Representing Belgium
Olympic Games
Silver medal – second place	1900 Paris	Eight
Silver medal – second place	1908 London	Eight
European Rowing Championships
Silver medal – second place	1900 Paris	Coxed pair
Gold medal – first place	1900 Paris	Coxed four
Gold medal – first place	1900 Paris	Eight
Gold medal – first place	1901 Zürich	Eight
Gold medal – first place	1902 Strasbourg	Coxed pair
Gold medal – first place	1902 Strasbourg	Eight

Alfred Van Landeghem (26 October 1891 – 10 October 1914) was a Belgian coxswain who won silver medals in men's eight at the 1900 Summer Olympics and again in men's eight at the 1908 Summer Olympics as part of the Royal Club Nautique de Gand team.

According to Olympic historian Hilary Evans, birth registers in Ghent indicate that Van Landeghem was born in 1891, which would have made him just over eight years old when he competed in the 1900 Olympics. This makes Van Landeghem the youngest Olympian in history as well as the youngest Olympic medalist in history. Evans also noted that Van Landeghem died soon before his twenty-third birthday and may have been killed at the First Battle of Ypres, although his name is not found in lists of Belgian deaths in the first World War. Evans speculated, on the basis of visual resemblance, that Van Landeghem may have actually been the "unknown French boy" that won the 1900 Olympic men's coxed pair rowing competition with the Dutch team, although he admitted that the evidence supporting this hypothesis was "circumstantial at best".
