= Rowing at the 1900 Summer Olympics – Men's coxed pair =

Rowing at the Olympics

Men's coxed pair at the Games of the II Olympiad
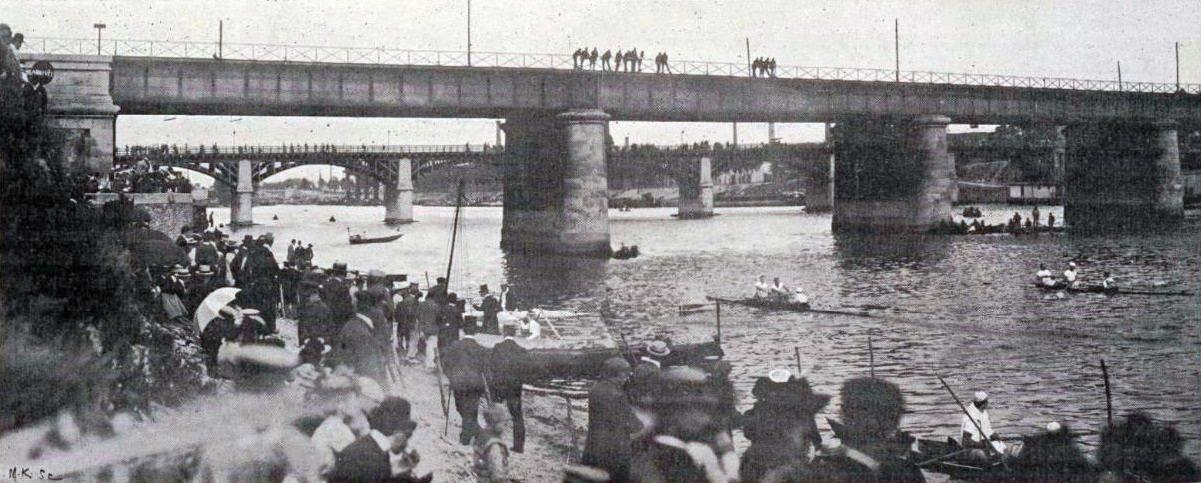
- A coxed pair race in 1900
- Venue: Seine
- Dates: August 25–26, 1900
- Competitors: 22 from 3 nations
- Winning time: 7:34.2

Medalists
1st place, gold medalist(s)		Minerva Amsterdam; Netherlands
2nd place, silver medalist(s)		Société nautique de la Marne; France
3rd place, bronze medalist(s)		Rowing Club Castillon; France

The men's coxed pair was one of the competitions in the Rowing at the 1900 Summer Olympics events in Paris. It was held on 25 August and 26 August 1900. 7 boats, involving 22 rowers from 3 nations, competed. The event was won by a mixed team; Minerva Amsterdam's Dutch crew replaced its coxswain with a local French boy for the final. François Brandt and Roelof Klein were the rowers, with Hermanus Brockmann the cox in the semifinals; the French cox is unknown. Second and third places both went to French boats; Société nautique de la Marne (Lucien Martinet, René Waleff, and an unknown cox) took silver while Rowing Club Castillon (Carlos Deltour, Antoine Védrenne, and cox Raoul Paoli) earned bronze.

== Background ==
This was the first appearance of the event. Rowing had been on the programme in 1896 but was cancelled due to bad weather. The men's coxed pair was one of the original four events in 1900, but was not held in 1904, 1908, or 1912. It returned to the programme after World War I and was held every Games from 1924 to 1992, when it (along with the men's coxed four) was replaced with the men's lightweight double sculls and men's lightweight coxless four.

== Competition format ==
The coxed pair event featured three-person boats, with two rowers and a coxswain. It was a sweep rowing event, with the rowers each having one oar (and thus each rowing on one side). The tournament featured two rounds: semifinals and a final. There were two semifinals, each with 3 or 4 boats; the top two in each advanced to the final. The final was a four-boat race.

The distance for each race was 1750 metres, rather than the 2000 metres which was becoming standard even at the time (and has been used in the Olympics since 1912, except in 1948). Rather than Olympic medals, the winning team was awarded a bronze statue titled La Chanson.

== Schedule ==
Date	Time	Round
Saturday, 25 August 1900	14:45	Semifinals
Sunday, 26 August 1900	15:30	Final

== Results ==
=== Semifinals ===
The top two boats in each semifinal advanced to the final.

==== Semifinal 1 ====
Rank	Boat	Rowers	Coxswain	Nation	Time	Notes
1	Société Nautique de la Marne	Lucien Martinet; René Waleff	Unknown	France	6:47.4	Q
2	Minerva Amsterdam	François Brandt; Roelof Klein	Hermanus Brockmann (Note: Brockmann was the coxswain for the Dutch team in the semifinal, but not in the final, in which an unknown French boy participated as the coxswain. Brockmann is considered a gold medallist by the IOC and is listed in that organization's medal database.)	Netherlands	6:56.0	Q
—	Stade Français	Louis Roche; Gordon Love	Unknown	France	DNF	

==== Semifinal 2 ====
Rank	Boat	Rowers	Coxswain	Nation	Time	Notes
1	Rowing Club Castillon	Carlos Deltour; Antoine Védrenne	Raoul Paoli	France	6:33.4	Q
2	Cercle Nautique de Reims	Pierre Ferlin; Mathieu	Unknown	France	7:00.0	Q
3	Royal Club Nautique de Gand	Prosper Bruggeman; Maurice Hemelsoet	Unknown	Belgium	7:00.4	
4	Club Nautique de Dieppe	Henri Delabarre; Robert Gelée	Unknown	France	7:04.0	

=== Final ===
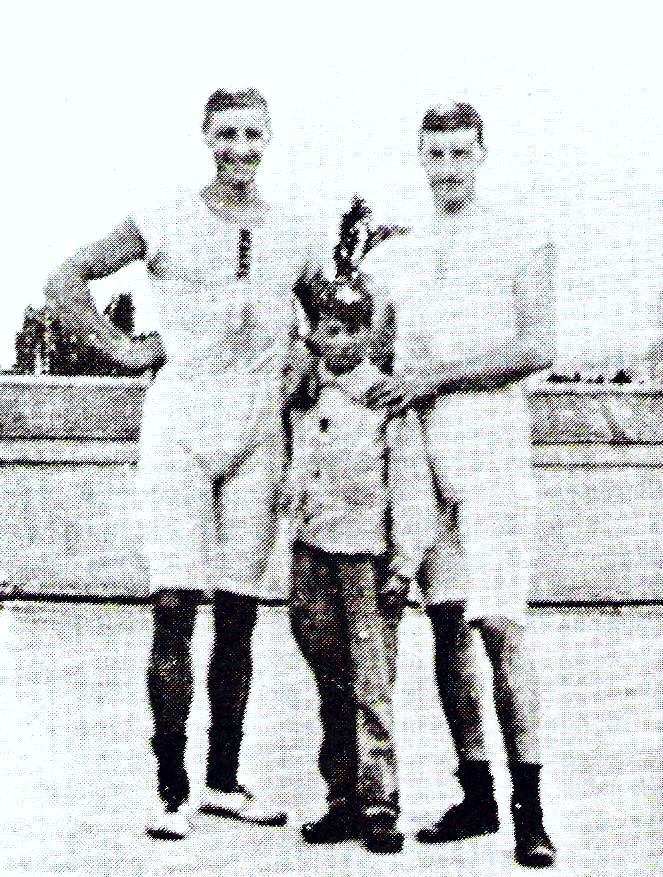
François Brandt (left), Roelof Klein and their coxswain, an unknown French boy, after the coxed pair final at the 1900 Olympics

In the semifinals, the Dutch team had been coxed by Hermanus Brockmann, who weighed 60 kg. They saw that the French teams made use of young light-weighted boys of about 25 kg, and decided to switch coxswains to reduce weight, recruiting a young Parisian boy for the job. In the final, the Dutch team took the lead from the start. In the end, the French team came very close, but the Dutch team won a tight race with the French boat sent by the Marne society.

Rank	Boat	Rowers	Coxswain	Nation	Time
1st place, gold medalist(s)	Minerva Amsterdam	François Brandt; Roelof Klein	"Unknown French boy"	Netherlands	7:34.2
2nd place, silver medalist(s)	Société Nautique de la Marne	Lucien Martinet; René Waleff	Unknown	France	7:34.4
3rd place, bronze medalist(s)	Rowing Club Castillon	Carlos Deltour; Antoine Védrenne	Raoul Paoli	France	7:57.2
4	Cercle Nautique de Reims	Pierre Ferlin; Mathieu	Unknown	France	8:01.0

== Results summary ==
Rank	Boat	Rowers	Coxswain	Nation	Semifinals	Final
1st place, gold medalist(s)	Minerva Amsterdam	François Brandt; Roelof Klein	Hermanus Brockmann (semi); Unknown (final)	Netherlands	6:56.0	7:34.2
2nd place, silver medalist(s)	Société Nautique de la Marne	Lucien Martinet; René Waleff	Unknown	France	6:47.4	7:34.4
3rd place, bronze medalist(s)	Rowing Club Castillon	Carlos Deltour; Antoine Védrenne	Raoul Paoli	France	6:33.4	7:57.2
4	Cercle Nautique de Reims	Pierre Ferlin; Mathieu	Unknown	France	7:00.0	8:01.0
5	Royal Club Nautique de Gand	Prosper Bruggeman; Maurice Hemelsoet	Unknown	Belgium	7:00.4	Did not advance
6	Club Nautique de Dieppe	Henri Delabarre; Robert Gelée	Unknown	France	7:04.0	Did not advance
—	Stade Français	Louis Roche; Gordon Love	Unknown	France	DNF	Did not advance
