= Rowing at the 1900 Summer Olympics – Men's single sculls =

Rowing at the Olympics

Men's single sculls at the Games of the II Olympiad
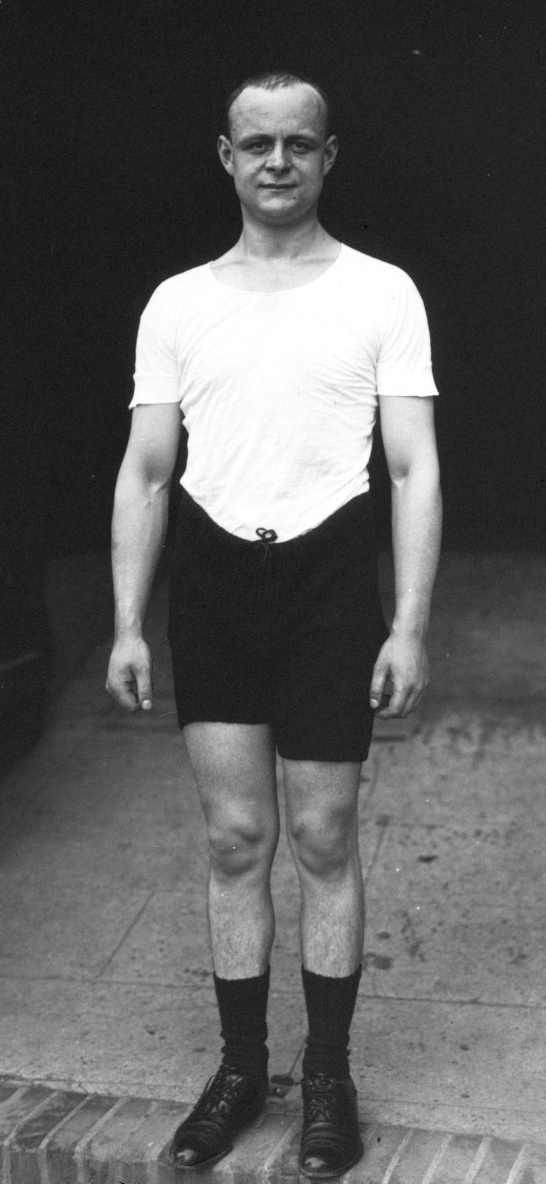
- Gold medalist Hermann Barrelet (1911)
- Venue: Seine
- Dates: 25–26 August 1900
- Competitors: 12 from 3 nations
- Winning time: 7:35.6

Medalists
1st place, gold medalist(s)		Hermann Barrelet; France
2nd place, silver medalist(s)		André Gaudin; France
3rd place, bronze medalist(s)		Saint-George Ashe; Great Britain

The single sculls was one of the competitions in the Rowing at the 1900 Summer Olympics events in Paris. It was held on 25 and 26 August 1900. 12 athletes from 3 nations competed. Four quarterfinals, two semifinals, and a final were held. The event was won by Hermann Barrelet of France; the host nation also took silver with André Gaudin. Saint-George Ashe of Great Britain earned bronze, after interfering with another rower in the quarterfinals and advancing out of the semifinals for unknown reasons after placing third in his heat.

== Background ==
This was the first appearance of the event. Rowing had been on the programme in 1896 but was cancelled due to bad weather. The single sculls has been held every time that rowing has been contested, beginning in 1900.

Great Britain's best sculler, C. V. Fox, entered but withdrew.

== Competition format ==
The tournament featured three rounds: quarterfinals, semifinals, and a final. There were four quarterfinals, each with three boats; the top two in each advanced to the semifinals. The two semifinals each had four boats, with the top two advancing to the final. The final was a four-boat race.

The distance for each race was 1750 metres, rather than the 2000 metres which was becoming standard even at the time (and has been used in the Olympics since 1912, except in 1948).

== Schedule ==
Date	Time	Round
Saturday, 25 August 1900	9:00	Quarterfinals
Sunday, 26 August 1900	10:00; 16:30	Semifinals; Final

== Results ==
=== Quarterfinals ===
The top two rowers in each heat advanced to the semifinals.

==== Quarterfinal 1 ====
Ashe went out of his rowing lane, interfering with Benoit. Despite this, he was not disqualified.

Rank	Rower	Nation	Time	Notes
1	Saint-George Ashe	Great Britain	6:38.8	Q
2	Raymond-Benoît	France	6:45.4	Q
3	Édouard Dammann	France	7:13.0	

==== Quarterfinal 2 ====
Rank	Rower	Nation	Time	Notes
1	Hermann Barrelet	France	6:38.8	Q
2	André Gaudin	France	6:43.0	Q
3	Lardon	France	6:46.4	

==== Quarterfinal 3 ====
Rank	Rower	Nation	Time	Notes
1	Louis Prével	France	6:29.6	Q
2	Robert d'Heilly	France	6:38.8	Q
—	Maxime Piaggio	France	DNF	

==== Quarterfinal 4 ====
Rank	Rower	Nation	Time	Notes
1	Charles Delaporte	France	6:33.8	Q
2	Pierre Ferlin	France	6:46.8	Q
—	Antonio Vela	Spain	DNF	

=== Semifinals ===
The top two rowers in each semifinal advanced to the final.

==== Semifinal 1 ====
For unknown reasons, Ashe protested the result of this semifinal. Barrelet and Gaudin objected and refused to race if Ashe were advanced, but eventually relented. The final therefore included five rowers instead of the planned four.

Rank	Rower	Nation	Time	Notes
1	Hermann Barrelet	France	8:23.0	Q
2	André Gaudin	France	8:33.4	Q
3	Saint-George Ashe	Great Britain	8:37.2	q
4	Raymond-Benoît	France	Unknown	

==== Semifinal 2 ====
Rank	Rower	Nation	Time	Notes
1	Louis Prével	France	8:36.4	Q
2	Robert d'Heilly	France	8:45.0	Q
3	Charles Delaporte	France	9:25.2	
4	Pierre Ferlin	France	Unknown	

=== Final ===
Yet another protest marred the single sculls competition in the final, as Prével complained of being interfered with after falling in the water and dropping out of the race; his protest was rejected. Barrelet and Gaudin, who had placed first and second in both the preliminary round and the semifinal, did so once again in the final. Ashe took the bronze medal, with d'Heilly close behind him.

Rank	Rower	Nation	Time
1st place, gold medalist(s)	Hermann Barrelet	France	7:35.6
2nd place, silver medalist(s)	André Gaudin	France	7:41.6
3rd place, bronze medalist(s)	Saint-George Ashe	Great Britain	8:15.6
4	Robert d'Heilly	France	8:16.0
—	Louis Prével	France	DNF

== Results summary ==
Rank	Rower	Nation	Quarterfinals	Semifinals	Final
1st place, gold medalist(s)	Hermann Barrelet	France	6:38.8	8:23.0	7:35.6
2nd place, silver medalist(s)	André Gaudin	France	6:43.0	8:33.4	7:41.6
3rd place, bronze medalist(s)	Saint-George Ashe	Great Britain	6:38.8	8:37.2	8:15.6
4	Robert d'Heilly	France	6:38.8	8:45.0	8:16.0
5	Louis Prével	France	6:29.6	8:36.4	DNF
6	Charles Delaporte	France	6:33.8	9:25.2	Did not advance
7	Pierre Ferlin	France	6:46.8	Unknown	Did not advance
7	Raymond-Benoît	France	6:45.4	Unknown	Did not advance
9	Lardon	France	6:46.4	Did not advance	
10	Édouard Dammann	France	7:13.0	Did not advance	
—	Maxime Piaggio	France	DNF	Did not advance	
—	Antonio Vela	Spain	DNF	Did not advance	
