= Saint-George Ashe =

British rower

Personal information
- Born: 23 May 1871 Malta
- Died: 24 July 1922 (aged 51) Hastings, England
Medal record
Men's rowing
Representing Great Britain
Olympic Games
Bronze medal – third place	1900 Paris	Single sculls

Saint George Ashe (23 May 1871 – 24 July 1922) was a British rower who competed in Rowing at the 1900 Summer Olympics in Paris winning the bronze medal in the single sculls, and won the Wingfield Sculls in 1904.

Ashe was born in Malta. He was a member of Thames Rowing Club and in 1900 was the only rower to represent Britain at the 1900 Summer Olympics held in Paris, France, in his first round heat, Ashe was disqualified after rowing into Raymond-Benoît and capsizing him, due to no one finishing the full course the judges decided to re-run the race, this time Ashe won by seven seconds. In the final he was third in single sculls behind Hermann Barrelet and André Gaudin but was lucky as he was in fourth place until Louis Prével fell overboard.

He entered the Diamond Challenge Sculls at Henley Royal Regatta seven times and was runner up in 1901 to C V Fox. He won the Wingfield Sculls in 1904 beating Arthur Cloutte, and was runner-up in 1905 and 1906 to Harry Blackstaffe. In 1898 Ashe had attempted to row across the English Channel, but the weather was unfavorable and after about three miles he started to take in water and was rescued by a tug that was accompanying him.

Ashe died aged 51 years old in St Leonards-on-Sea, the verdict of his death was "suicide during temporary insanity", he was found dead in a house near some gas taps that were switched on.
