= Jules De Bisschop =

Belgian rower

Personal information
- Full name: Jules Maria Adolphe Henri De Bisschop
- Born: 5 February 1879 Ghent, Belgium
- Died: 21 December 1954 (aged 75) Ghent, Belgium

Sport
- Sport: Rowing
- Club: Royal Club Nautique de Gand
Medal record
Men's rowing
Representing Belgium
Olympic Games
| Silver medal – second place | 1900 Paris | Eight |
European Rowing Championships
| Gold medal – first place | 1898 Turin | Eight |
| Gold medal – first place | 1899 Ostend | Eight |
| Gold medal – first place | 1900 Paris | Eight |

Jules Maria Adolphe Henri De Bisschop (5 February 1879 – 21 December 1954) was a Belgian rower who competed in the 1900 Summer Olympics. He was a member of the Belgian club Royal Club Nautique de Gand and with his team, he won the silver medal in the men's eight.
