= Frank Odberg =

Belgian rower

Personal information
- Full name: Frank Olof Odberg
- Born: 1 March 1879 Ghent, Belgium
- Died: 1917 (aged 37–38)

Sport
- Sport: Rowing
- Club: KRCG, Gent
Medal record
Men's rowing
Representing Belgium
Olympic Games
Silver medal – second place	1900 Paris	Eight
European Rowing Championships
Gold medal – first place	1898 Turin	Eight
Gold medal – first place	1900 Paris	Eight

Frank Olof Odberg (1 March 1879 – 1917) was a Belgian rower who competed in the 1900 Summer Olympics. He was a member of the Belgian club Royal Club Nautique de Gand and with his team, he won the silver medal in the men's eight.
