= Carlos Deltour =

French rower (1864–1920)

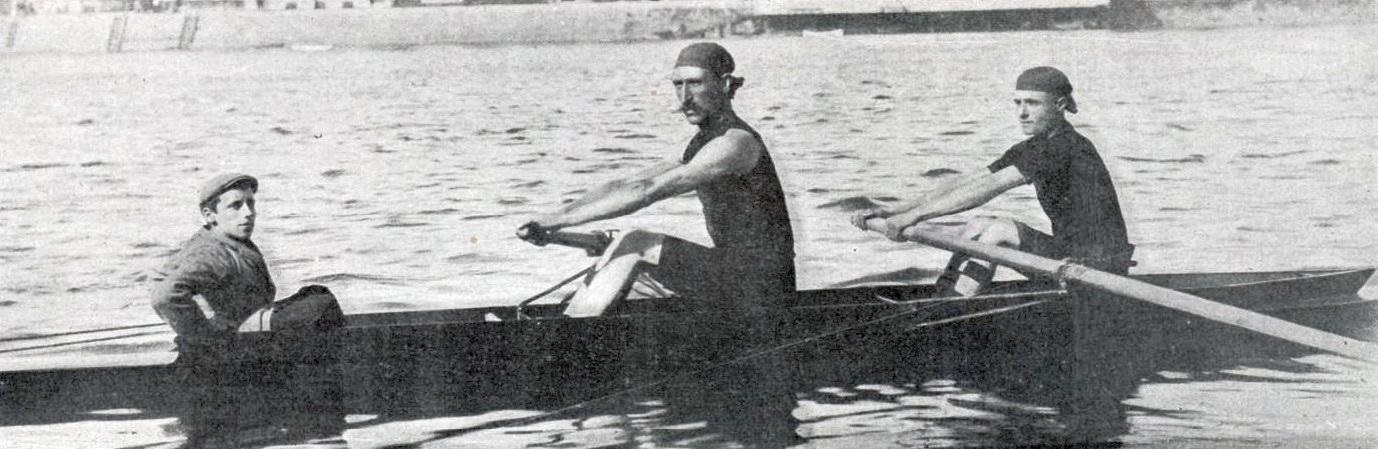

Personal information
- Nationality: French
- Born: 8 April 1864 Guadalajara, Mexico
- Died: 29 May 1920 (aged 56) Cambo-les-Bains, France

Sport
- Sport: Rowing
- Club: Rowing Club Castillon, Castillon-la-Bataille
Medal record
Men's rowing
Representing France
Olympic Games
Bronze medal – third place	1900 Paris	Coxed pair
European Rowing Championships
Silver medal – second place	1897 Pallanza	Coxed pair
Gold medal – first place	1899 Ostend	Coxed pair
Gold medal – first place	1900 Paris	Double scull
Bronze medal – third place	1903 Venice	Eight

Carlos Deltour (8 April 1864 – 29 May 1920), also known as Charles Deltour, was a Mexican-born French rower who competed in the 1900 Summer Olympics.

He was part of the French boat Rowing Club Castillon, which won the bronze medal in the 1900 Paris coxed pair. He was also a rugby union player of SBUC.
