= Rowing at the 1900 Summer Olympics – Men's eight =

Men's eight at the Games of the II Olympiad
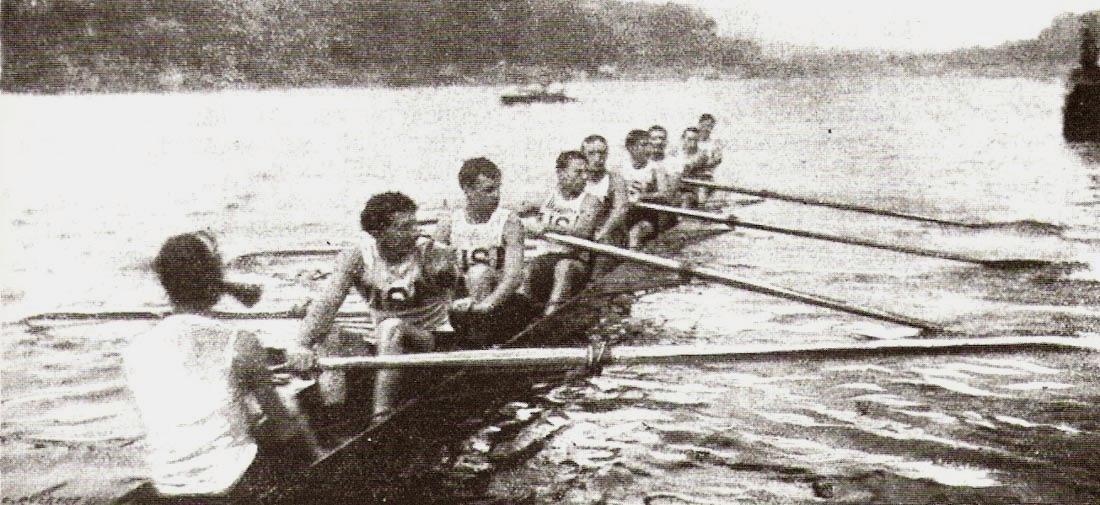
- United States men's eight team at the 1900 Games
- Venue: Seine
- Dates: August 25–26, 1900
- Competitors: 46 from 5 nations
- Winning time: 6:07.8

Medalists
1st place, gold medalist(s)		Vesper Boat Club; United States
2nd place, silver medalist(s)		Royal Club Nautique de Gand; Belgium
3rd place, bronze medalist(s)		Minerva Amsterdam; Netherlands

The men's eight was one of the competitions in the Rowing at the 1900 Summer Olympics events in Paris. It was held on 25 and 26 August 1900. 5 boats, involving 46 rowers from 5 nations, competed. The event was won by the United States, represented by the Vesper Boat Club. Silver went to the Royal Club Nautique de Gand of Belgium, with bronze to Minerva Amsterdam from the Netherlands.

== Background ==
This was the first appearance of the event. Rowing had been on the programme in 1896 but was cancelled due to bad weather. The eight has been held every time that rowing has been contested, beginning in 1900.

== Competition format ==
The "eight" event featured nine-person boats, with eight rowers and a coxswain. It was a sweep rowing event, with the rowers each having one oar (and thus each rowing on one side). The distance for each race was 1750 metres, rather than the 2000 metres which was becoming standard even at the time (and has been used in the Olympics since 1912, except in 1948).

The tournament featured two rounds: semifinals and a final.

- Semifinals: Two heats of 2 or 3 boats each. It was intended that the top 2 boats from each heat would advance to a 4-boat final, but when one of the boats in the 2-boat heat did not finish, the 3rd-place boat from the 3-boat heat advanced instead.
- Final: A single final of 4 boats, determining medals and 4th place.

== Schedule ==
Date	Time	Round
Saturday, 25 August 1900	11:00	Semifinals
Sunday, 26 August 1900	17:30	Final

== Results ==
=== Semifinals ===
The top two boats in each semifinal were intended to advance to the final. However, only one boat in the second semifinal finished, so the third-place boat in the first semifinal advanced. This meant that of the five boats competing in the semifinal, the only one to not advance was the one that did not finish.

==== Semifinal 1 ====
Rank	Boat	Rowers	Coxswain	Nation	Time	Notes
1	Minerva Amsterdam	François Brandt; Johannes van Dijk; Roelof Klein; Ruurd Leegstra; Walter Middelberg; Hendrik Offerhaus; Walter Thijssen; Henricus Tromp	Hermanus Brockmann	Netherlands	4:59.2	Q
2	Royal Club Nautique de Gand	Jules De Bisschop; Prosper Bruggeman; Oscar Dessomville; Oscar De Cock; Maurice Hemelsoet; Marcel Van Crombrugge; Frank Odberg; Maurice Verdonck	Rodolphe Poma	Belgium	5:00.2	Q
3	Der Hamburger und Germania Ruder Club	Gustav Goßler; Oscar Goßler; Ernst Jencquel; Edgar Katzenstein; Walther Katzenstein; Theodor Laurezzari; Waldemar Tietgens; Arthur Warncke	Alexander Gleichmann	Germany	5:04.8	Q

==== Semifinal 2 ====
Rank	Boat	Rowers	Coxswain	Nation	Time	Notes
1	Vesper Boat Club	William Carr; Harry DeBaecke; John Exley; John Geiger; Edwin Hedley; James Juvenal; Roscoe Lockwood; Edward Marsh	Louis Abell	United States	5:15.4	Q
—	Société Nautique de la Marne	Maurice Carton; Chantriaux; Paul Cocuet; Jules Demaré; Clément Dorlia; Guilbert; Lucien Martinet; René Waleff	Unknown	France	DNF	

=== Final ===
Rank	Boat	Rowers	Coxswain	Nation	Time
1st place, gold medalist(s)	Vesper Boat Club	William Carr; Harry DeBaecke; John Exley; John Geiger; Edwin Hedley; James Juvenal; Roscoe Lockwood; Edward Marsh	Louis Abell	United States	6:07.8
2nd place, silver medalist(s)	Royal Club Nautique de Gand	Jules De Bisschop; Prosper Bruggeman; Oscar Dessomville; Oscar De Cock; Maurice Hemelsoet; Marcel Van Crombrugge; Frank Odberg; Maurice Verdonck	Rodolphe Poma	Belgium	6:13.8
3rd place, bronze medalist(s)	Minerva Amsterdam	François Brandt; Johannes van Dijk; Roelof Klein; Ruurd Leegstra; Walter Middelberg; Hendrik Offerhaus; Walter Thijssen; Henricus Tromp	Hermanus Brockmann	Netherlands	6:23.0
4	Der Hamburger und Germania Ruder Club	Gustav Goßler; Oscar Goßler; Ernst Jencquel; Edgar Katzenstein; Walther Katzenstein; Theodor Laurezzari; Waldemar Tietgens; Arthur Warncke	Unknown	Germany	6:33.0

== Results summary ==
Rank	Boat	Rowers	Coxswain	Nation	Semifinals	Final
1st place, gold medalist(s)	Vesper Boat Club	William Carr; Harry DeBaecke; John Exley; John Geiger; Edwin Hedley; James Juvenal; Roscoe Lockwood; Edward Marsh	Louis Abell	United States	5:15.4	6:07.8
2nd place, silver medalist(s)	Royal Club Nautique de Gand	Jules De Bisschop; Prosper Bruggeman; Oscar Dessomville; Oscar De Cock; Maurice Hemelsoet; Marcel Van Crombrugge; Frank Odberg; Maurice Verdonck	Rodolphe Poma	Belgium	5:00.2	6:13.8
3rd place, bronze medalist(s)	Minerva Amsterdam	François Brandt; Johannes van Dijk; Roelof Klein; Ruurd Leegstra; Walter Middelberg; Hendrik Offerhaus; Walter Thijssen; Henricus Tromp	Hermanus Brockmann	Netherlands	4:59.2	6:23.0
4	Der Hamburger und Germania Ruder Club	Gustav Goßler; Oscar Goßler; Ernst Jencquel; Edgar Katzenstein; Walther Katzenstein; Theodor Laurezzari; Waldemar Tietgens; Arthur Warncke	Alexander Gleichmann (semis); Unknown (final)	Germany	5:04.8	6:33.0
5	Société Nautique de la Marne	Maurice Carton; Chantriaux; Paul Cocuet; Jules Demaré; Clément Dorlia; Guilbert; Lucien Martinet; René Waleff	Unknown	France	DNF	Did not advance
