= Charles Hahn (rower) =

French rower (1893–1986)

Personal information
- Nationality: German; French
- Born: Carl Wilhelm Walter Hahn; 5 July 1893 Straßburg, Alsace-Lorraine, German Empire
- Died: 1 March 1986 (aged 92) Dalkingen, Germany

Sport
- Sport: Rowing
Medal record
Men's rowing
Representing Alsace-Lorraine
European Rowing Championships
Bronze medal – third place	1902 Strasbourg	Double scull

Carl Wilhelm Walter Hahn (5 July 1893 – 1 March 1986) was a rower from Straßburg Strasbourg which during his early life was part of the German Empire. After WWI, he competed for France known as Charles Hahn.

Hahn was born in Straßburg in 1893. At the 1902 European Rowing Championships, he won a bronze medal in the double scull teamed up with G. Bornet starting for Alsace-Lorraine. His home town became part of France after WWI and at the 1920 Summer Olympics, he competed in the men's eight for France where they were eliminated in the semi-final.
