= HMS Lord Clive =

World War I British monitor

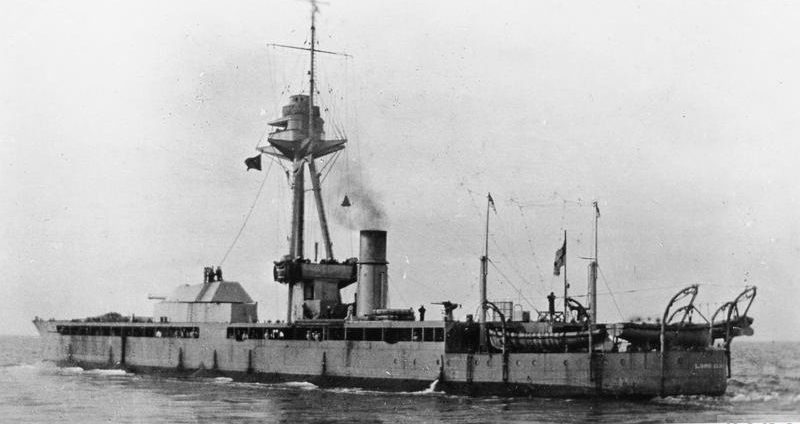
- Lord Clive underway, 1915–1918

History

United Kingdom
- Name: Lord Clive
- Namesake: Robert Clive, 1st Baron Clive
- Builder: Harland & Wolff, Belfast
- Yard number: 478
- Laid down: 9 January 1915
- Launched: 10 June 1915
- Completed: 10 July 1915
- Commissioned: 10 July 1915
- Decommissioned: 26 November 1918
- Fate: Sold for scrap, 10 October 1927

General characteristics (as built)
- Class & type: Lord Clive-class monitor
- Displacement: 5,850 long tons (5,944 t) (deep load)
- Length: 335 ft 6 in (102.3 m)
- Beam: 87 ft 2 in (26.6 m)
- Draught: 9 ft 11 in (3.02 m)
- Installed power: 2 water-tube boilers; 2,310 ihp (1,720 kW)
- Propulsion: 2 shafts; 2 triple-expansion steam engines
- Speed: 7 knots (13 km/h; 8.1 mph) (service)
- Endurance: 1,100 nmi (2,000 km; 1,300 mi) at 6.5 knots (12 km/h; 7 mph)
- Complement: 194
- Armament: 1 × twin 12 in (305 mm) guns; 2 × single 12 pdr 3 in (76 mm) AA guns; 1 × single 3 pdr (47 mm (1.9 in)) AA gun; 1 × single 2 pdr (40 mm (1.6 in)) AA gun
- Armour: Belt: 6 in (152 mm); Bulkheads: 6 in (152 mm); Turret face: 10.5 in (267 mm); Turret sides 5.5 in (140 mm); Barbette: 8 in (203 mm); Conning tower: 6 in (152 mm); Deck: 1–2 in (25–51 mm)

HMS Lord Clive was the lead ship of her class of eight monitors built for the Royal Navy during World War I. Their primary armament was taken from obsolete pre-dreadnought battleships. The ship spent the war in the English Channel bombarding German positions along the Belgian coast as part of the Dover Patrol, often serving as a flagship. She participated in the failed First Ostend Raid in 1918, bombarding the defending coastal artillery as the British attempted to block the Bruges–Ostend Canal. Lord Clive was one of two ships in the class fitted with a single 18-inch (457 mm) gun in 1918, but she only fired four rounds from it in combat before the end of the war in November. The ship conducted gunnery trials after the war and was sold for scrap in 1927.

== Design ==
All of the British monitors built during the war were intended to bombard land targets. To this end the Lord Clive class were given a heavy armament modified to increase its range and a shallow draught to allow them to work inshore as necessary. As the Royal Navy did not expect the ships to engage in naval combat, speed was very much not a priority. Lord Clive had an overall length of 335 feet 6 inches (102.3 m), a beam of 87 feet 2 inches (26.6 m) including the torpedo bulge, 57 feet (17.4 m) without, and a draught of 9 feet 11 inches (3.02 m) at deep load. She displaced 5,850 long tons (5,940 t) at deep load and her crew numbered 12 officers and 182 ratings. The ship was powered by a pair of four-cylinder Harland & Wolff triple-expansion steam engines, each driving one propeller shaft using steam provided by two water-tube boilers. The engines were designed to produce a total of 2,310 indicated horsepower (1,720 kW) which was intended to give her a maximum speed of 10 knots (18.5 km/h; 11.5 mph). On her sea trials Lord Clive only made 8.02 knots (14.9 km/h; 9.2 mph) because her designers were unfamiliar with the proper way to contour her hull to maximise her propeller efficiency; the ship reached 7 knots (13.0 km/h; 8.1 mph) in service as she was more heavily loaded. The monitor carried 356 long tons (362 t) of coal which gave her a range of 1,100 nautical miles (2,000 km; 1,300 mi) at 6.5 knots (12.0 km/h; 7.5 mph).

=== Armament, fire control, and armour ===
The Lord Clives mounted two BL 12-inch (305 mm) Mk VIII guns in a single hydraulically powered gun turret which came from the Majestic-class predreadnought battleships; Lord Clive received hers from Magnificent. To suit their new role as long-range bombardment weapons, the turrets were modified to increase the maximum elevation of the guns from 13.5° to 30°. Their secondary armament consisted of a pair of quick-firing (QF) 12-pounder (3 in (76 mm)) guns on low-angle mounts. Anti-aircraft defence was provided by a single Vickers QF 3-pounder (47 mm (1.9 in)) Mk I gun and a QF 2-pounder (40 mm (1.6 in)) Mk I gun.

The spotting top on the tripod mast between the turret and the funnel housed a rangefinder that fed data to the director on the roof of the spotting top. The director's crew would calculate the amount of traverse and elevation needed to hit the target and transmit that information to the turret for the guns to follow.

The Lord Clive-class ships were protected against gunfire by a sloping waterline belt amidships of 6-inch (152 mm) Krupp cemented armour (KCA) that was closed off at its ends by transverse bulkheads of equal thicknesses to form the ships' central armoured citadel. The 2-inch-thick (51 mm) upper deck of high-tensile steel served as the roof of the citadel and the forecastle deck above it consisted of 1-inch (25 mm) plates of high-tensile steel. For protection against torpedoes, the ships were fitted with bulges 15 feet (4.6 m) deep.

The turret taken from Magnificent retained its original armour, viz. 10.5-inch-thick (270 mm) faces and 5.5-inch (140 mm) sides with a 2-inch roof, all of Harvey armour. Its original circular barbettes was replaced by a new one formed from a dozen plates of 8-inch (203 mm) KCA. The ships were also fitted with a cast-steel conning tower just forward of the barbette that had 6-inch sides and a roof 2.5 inches (64 mm) thick.

=== Wartime modifications ===
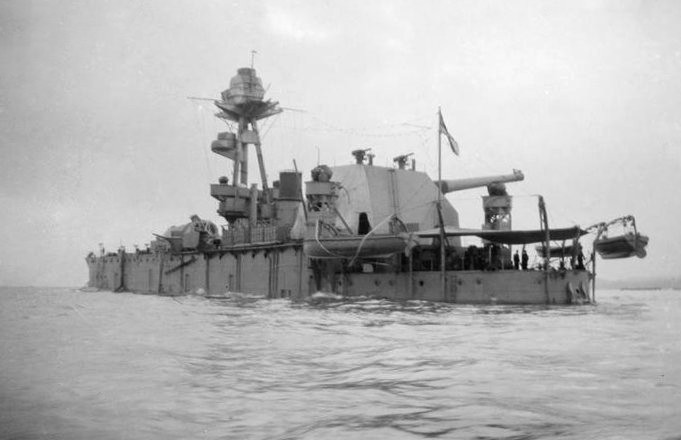
The stern of HMS Lord Clive showing her BL 18-inch gun on its fixed mounting, November 1918

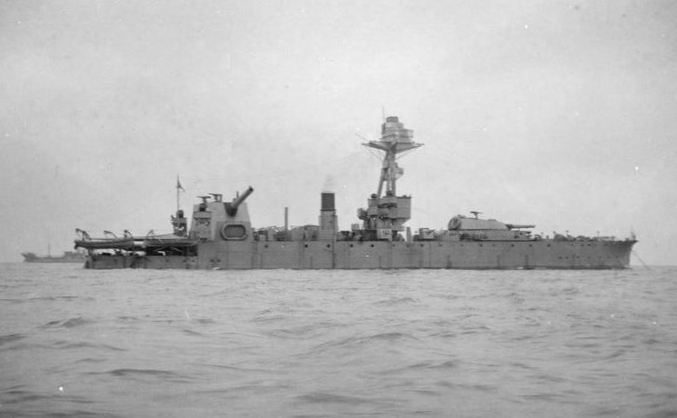
Lord Clive in November 1918, during the surrender of the German High Seas Fleet

A pair of QF 6-inch guns with 200 rounds per gun were added in early 1916 abreast the funnel when it was realized that the two 12-pounder guns were not powerful enough to defend the ship from German destroyers. Two coal bunkers were turned into magazines for them, reducing the range to approximately 960 nmi (1,780 km; 1,100 mi), and increasing the crew in size to 215, necessitating plating in the sides of much of the upper deck to provide quarters. These guns were later exchanged for longer-ranged 6-inch Mk VII guns. By 1918 they had been replaced in their turn by four BL 4-inch (102 mm) Mk IX guns abreast the bridge. The 12-pounder guns were replaced, probably in 1917, by QF 3-inch (76 mm) Mk I anti-aircraft guns.

The biggest change was the addition of a BL 18-inch (457 mm) Mk I gun in an enormous gun shield mounted abaft the engine room, fixed over the starboard side. The gun itself could traverse 20°, but the gun shield was fixed. The entire mount weighed 384 long tons (390 t), but the total weight of the ammunition, equipment and supports nearly doubled this again. This weight so far aft promised to increase the draught at the stern enough that the after inboard compartments of the torpedo bulge, which were normally free-flooding, were closed up, but the ship's draught increased to 8 ft 6 in (2.59 m) forward and 13 ft 2 in (4.01 m) aft. This corresponded to a displacement of 6,850 long tons (6,960 t), even after removal of the armored conning tower in compensation. The gun was hydraulically worked, but the ammunition parties had to use muscle power. The shells were stowed below deck and had to be moved by overhead rail to the hatch in the deck behind the gun to be lifted up and loaded. The cordite propellant charges were kept in eighteen steam-heated storage tanks mounted on the forecastle deck abaft the funnel and moved to the gun on a bogie mounted on rails, two one-sixth charges at a time, reducing the rate of fire to about one round every 3–4 minutes. The interior of the ship was extensively modified to accommodate the larger crew of 278 officers and men, storage and handling gear for the sixty 18-inch shells, and to support the weight of the gun mount. Other changes included the transfer of the radio room down into the hold, the addition of a new gyrocompass, enlarging the bridge and rearranging the existing magazines and storage spaces. A pair of additional two-pounder AA guns were also installed on top of the gun shield.

== Construction and career ==
Lord Clive, named after Major-General Lord Robert Clive, the first British Governor of the Bengal Presidency, has been the only ship of her name to serve in the Royal Navy. She was laid down with the name M.6 on 9 January 1915 at Harland & Wolff's Berth no. 3 in its shipyard in Belfast, Northern Ireland, as yard number 478 and was renamed Lord Clive on 8 March. The ship was launched on 10 June and completed on 10 July at an estimated cost of about £260,000.

After Lord Clive finished working up she was sent to the Thames Estuary on 9 August 1915 to practice bombardment techniques with her sister ships Sir John Moore and Prince Rupert. A replica had been laid out there of some of the principal features of the Belgian coast near Zeebrugge and the ships practised their manoeuvring and spotting arrangements. Two tripods were dropped in the sea, housing observers which could triangulate the fall of shot and signal corrections to the monitors. One problem was that the modified 12-inch gun mounts broke down quite a bit, as they had not been designed to fire at angles up to 30° and many of their components were quite elderly. The ships were judged ready and a bombardment was planned on 21 August. This had to be postponed for a day because of bad weather, but Lord Clive, her sisters and their supporting armada of ten destroyers, nine minesweepers, the seaplane carrier Riviera, four ships to handle the observation tripods, and no less than fifty drifters to handle the explosive anti-submarine nets laid to protect the monitors, sailed to a position about 10 miles (16 km) off Zeebrugge during the night of 22–23 August. Lord Clive anchored and opened fire at 05:36 on the locks of the Zeebrugge Canal that led to the German naval base at Bruges, Belgium. She fired 31 shells at the locks over an hour and a half before switching targets to a nearby factory which received eleven rounds. Vice-Admiral Reginald Bacon ordered the ships to cease-fire after two hours, cancelling the plans to bombard Ostend as well since both Sir John Moore and Prince Rupert had been suffering significant problems with their turrets. The bombardment was ineffectual; two barges were sunk, but the locks were not hit. The British judged this a good first try and planned for a bombardment of Ostend once Sir John Moore and Prince Rupert had been repaired.

The operation had to be postponed for weather several times, but the 77-ship fleet, reinforced by the General Craufurd and the small M15-class monitor M25, was in position on the morning of 7 September. Visibility was excellent everywhere but over the target which was covered by a haze, and Bacon, using Lord Clive as his flagship, ordered a withdrawal. German submarines and aircraft attacked as they were leaving, but the monitors took no damage. The monitors returned in the afternoon when the haze cleared and Lord Clive opened fire at 15:30 with a ranging shot on the Ostende lighthouse. The newly emplaced Tirpitz Battery of four long-range 283 mm (11 in) guns started to return fire and soon began to near-miss Lord Clive. She steamed out to sea to open up the range, but her speed was so slow that the Germans had no difficulties compensating for the additional range and she was hit four times in quick succession about 15:50. One shell hit on the port bulge aft, another alongside the bulge forward, one on the bow and another, that failed to explode, on the starboard two-pounder gun, knocking the gun down to the quarterdeck. Only fourteen rounds were fired by the monitors before Bacon ordered them to retire, one of which set part of the dockyard on fire.

Another attempt was made on 19 September where the newly arrived monitor Marshal Ney attempted to suppress the four guns of the Tirpitz Battery with her 15-inch (380 mm) guns, while Lord Clive and Sir John Moore bombarded Ostend from positions thought to be outside the traversing limits of the German battery. This proved not to be the case and the monitors only managed a few rounds before they had to withdraw. On the 25th Lord Clive and several other monitors bombarded German positions at Westende as part of a deception operation to suggest that the Allies were launching an attack in that sector. During the remainder of September and October, she occasionally fired on German coastal batteries. During one of these later shoots the ship's left gun burst when a shell prematurely detonated inside the barrel.

=== 1916 ===
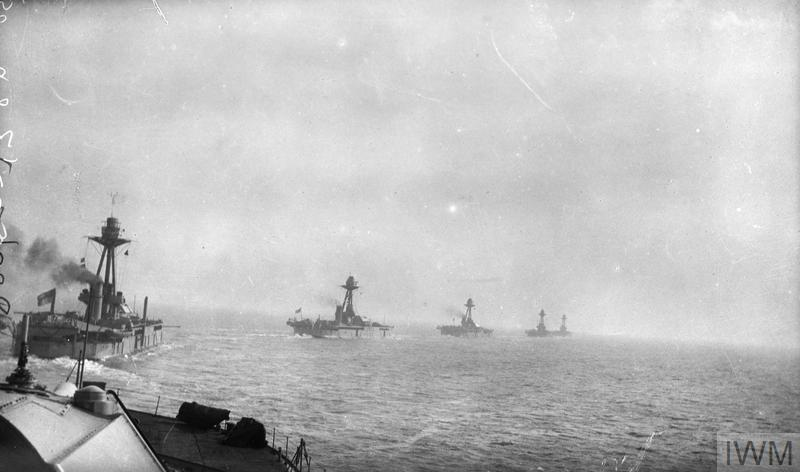
Lord Clive leading the six 12-inch monitors of the Dover Patrol, possibly in September 1916. Taken from Prince Rupert, showing (from left to right) Sir John Moore, Prince Eugene, General Craufurd, and General Wolfe.

During December 1915 and January 1916, Lord Clive was stationed in the Thames Estuary as a propaganda exercise to shoot down approaching German Zeppelins with shrapnel shells fired by her main guns, but the Zeppelins never came within range. Rear-Admiral (Contre-amiral) Charles de Marliave hoisted his flag aboard the ship and assumed command of a division of monitors as they bombarded German batteries at Westende on 26 January using the newly developed air-spotting techniques, but she only fired about eleven rounds during the half-hour bombardment. This was the last bombardment for the next seven months as the monitors were used to support British light forces and the Dover Barrage, the complex of minefields and nets in the Channel. Lord Clive was refitted during this period with a pair of six-inch guns to enhance her armament against German ships. This came in handy on 8 June when she, along with other monitors and destroyers, rebuffed an attempt by a dozen German ships to clear the nets and sweep the minefields. Lord Clive participated in a deception operation on 8 July when she, as well as French 240-millimetre (9.4 in) guns, fired blanks to cover the fire of the brand-new 12-inch Dominion Battery at Adinkerke as it targeted the Tirpitz Battery. The ship was fitted with a dummy second funnel to make the Germans think that she was a new monitor. The idea was to deceive the Germans as to the true origin of the shells landing around the battery, but the Germans were not totally deceived and retaliated against the French guns. After inspecting the Dominion Battery on 13 August, King Albert I of Belgium and his family visited the monitor.

Lord Clive and all of the other monitors of the Dover Patrol simulated preparations for an amphibious landing during the later stages of the Battle of the Somme by firing on German positions at Westende between 8 and 15 September 1916. She fired only 74 rounds during this period as the smaller monitors spent a considerable amount of time acting as offshore aiming marks for the three larger 15-inch (380 mm) monitors. This was the last bombardment of 1916 as the monitors reverted to their role of supporting the Dover Barrage and patrolling between Calais and The Downs. Lord Clive was given a refit in the Trafalgar Dry Dock at Southampton during October–November.

=== 1917–1918 ===
The monitor was nearby when a small group of German torpedo boats bombarded Dunkirk, France, during the night of 23/24 April 1917, and attempted to engage them in the darkness. She fired several rounds from her six-inch guns to little effect. Lord Clive was intended to be used during the Great Landing, a plan to land troops between Westende and Middelkerke to exploit the anticipated Allied gains made during the Battle of Passchendaele in July and pocket German troops between the landing and the advancing troops. The troops were to be landed via three enormous 2,500-long-ton (2,500 t) pontoons, each of which could carry a brigade of infantry, an artillery battery and three tanks. Each of the pontoons was lashed in position between two monitors and Lord Clive, together with Sir John Moore, was modified in March 1917 to handle one of them. The ship and her sisters rehearsed their role up until mid-July when the battle began, but the Allies could not make the ten-mile (16 km) advance necessary to launch the operation. Field Marshal Haig refused to support Bacon's proposal for a more modest landing in the Nieuport-Middelkerke area in September, so the operation was cancelled on 2 October.

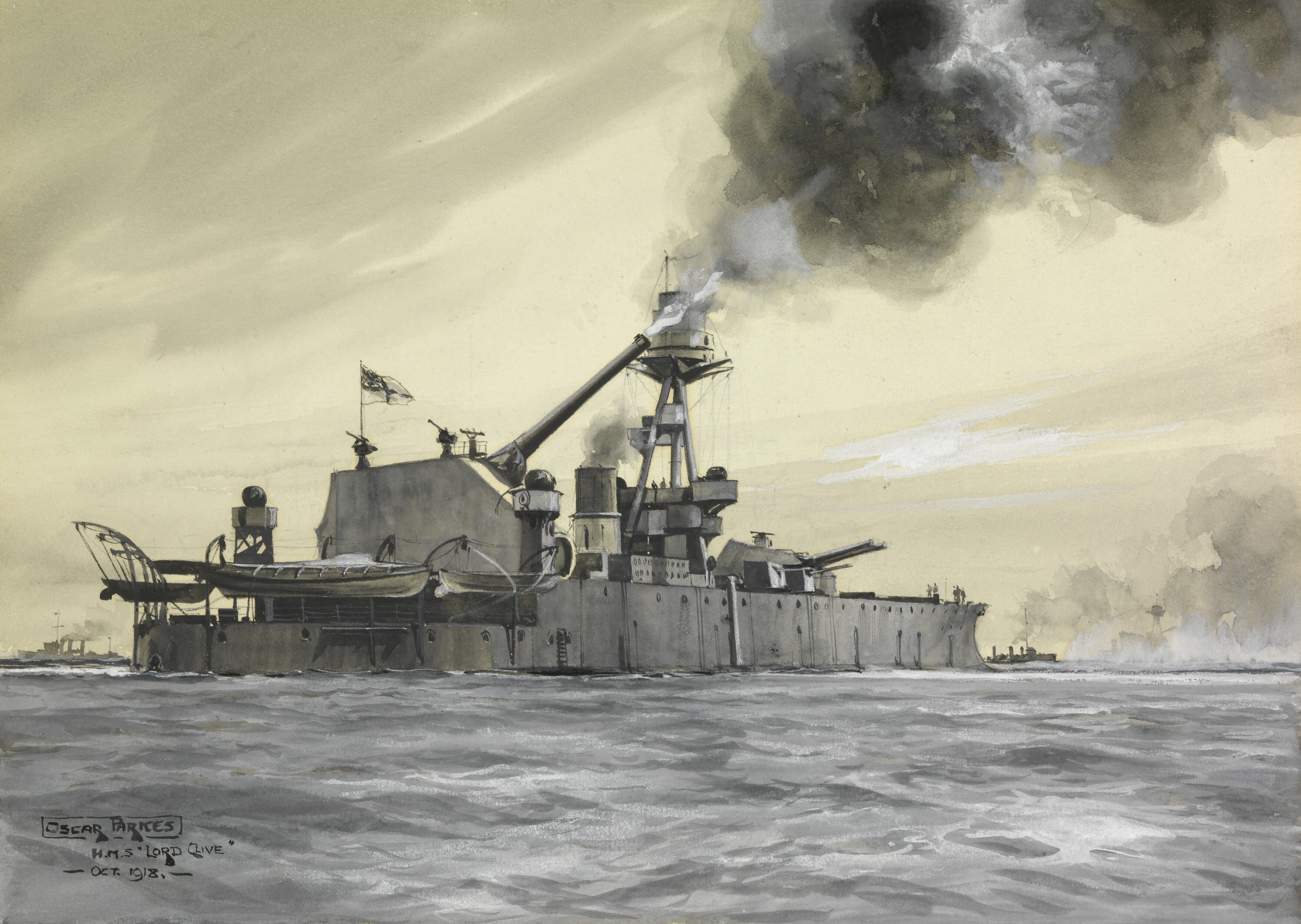
Illustration of Lord Clive by Oscar Parkes, 1918

Lord Clive was drydocked at Plymouth in October and resumed patrols in the Channel before she was taken in hand between 5 December 1917 and 6 April 1918 for modifications to mount the spare 18-inch gun from the large light cruiser Furious, although the gun and mount themselves would not be delivered until 7 September. She bombarded the Tirpitz and Aachen Batteries at Ostend, along with three other monitors, which fired fifty rounds between them during the abortive first attempt to block the Bruges–Ostend Canal that led to the naval base at Bruges on the night of 11 April. The ship supported the Inshore Squadron making the landing attempt during the First Ostend Raid on 23 April with about fifty rounds of 12-inch and some 6-inch shells. Lord Clive relieved the monitor Roberts as guardship at Yarmouth for five weeks while the latter was refitted. She arrived at Portsmouth on 16 August to have her 18-inch gun fitted. The monitor began operational trials with her new gun on 13 October. She fired one round on 14 October at the bridge at Snaeskerke during the morning, but received no spotting. The ship fired another three rounds later in the day but had to cease fire to avoid hitting friendly advancing troops.

=== Peacetime ===
Lord Clive was paid off almost immediately after the end of the war and laid up at Immingham. She was towed to Portsmouth in September 1920 to conduct trials with a triple 15-inch gun mount. The Royal Navy had no experience with firing three-gun salvoes from a single turret and wanted to investigate interference between the guns. Her 18-inch gun was removed, along with her secondary armament, and the three guns were installed on the 18-inch mount, covered only by a canvas screen. She recommissioned on 15 December, but she was not ready to conduct the trials until 1 February 1921 at Shoeburyness Range. They revealed no serious problems and she was paid off in August 1921 in Portsmouth. Lord Clive remained there until sold for scrap on 10 October 1927 for £13,500.

== Bibliography ==
- Bacon, Reginald (1919). The Dover Patrol 1915-1917. (2 vols.). New York: George H. Doran Co. OCLC 1136826. Vol. 1 • Vol. 2
- Buxton, Ian (2008) [1978]. Big Gun Monitors: Design, Construction and Operations 1914–1945 (2nd Revised ed.). Barnsley, UK: Seaforth Publishing. ISBN 978-1-84415-719-8.
- Colledge, J. J.; Warlow, Ben (2006) [1969]. Ships of the Royal Navy: The Complete Record of All Fighting Ships of the Royal Navy from the 15th Century to the Present (3rd Rev ed.). London: Chatham Publishing. ISBN 978-1-86176-281-8. OCLC 67375475.
- Crossley, Jim (2013). Monitors of the Royal Navy; How the Fleet Brought the Great Guns to Bear. Barnsley, UK: Pen & Sword. ISBN 978-1-78383-004-6.
- Dunn, Steve R. (2017). Securing the Narrow Sea: The Dover Patrol 1914–1918. Barnsley, UK: Seaforth Publishing. ISBN 978-1-84832-251-6.
- Preston, Antony (1985). "Great Britain and Empire Forces". In Gray, Randal (ed.). Conway's All the World's Fighting Ships 1906–1921. Annapolis, Maryland: Naval Institute Press. pp. 1–104. ISBN 0-85177-245-5.
