= Oscar De Cock =

Belgian rower

Personal information
- Nationality: Belgian
- Born: 1881
- Died: Unknown

Sport
- Sport: Rowing
- Club: Royal Club Nautique de Gand
Medal record
Men's rowing
Representing Belgium
Olympic Games
Silver medal – second place	1900 Paris	Eight
European Rowing Championships
Gold medal – first place	1900 Paris	Eight
Gold medal – first place	1901 Zürich	Eight

Oscar De Cock (born 1881, date of death unknown) was a Belgian rower who competed in the 1900 Summer Olympics.

He was part of the Belgian boat Royal Club Nautique de Gand, which won the silver medal in the men's eight.
