= André Gaudin =

French rower (1875–1926)

Olympic medal record

Men's rowing
Silver medal – second place	1900 Paris	Single sculls

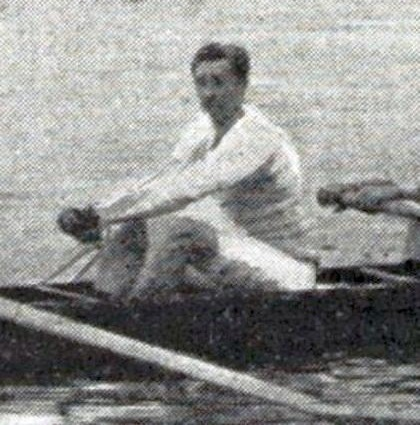
André Gaudin in 1902,

Charles André Gaudin (1 February 1875 – 19 April 1926) was a French rower who competed in the late 19th century and early 20th century. He participated in rowing at the 1900 Summer Olympics in Paris and won the silver medal in the single sculls. Herman Barrelet won gold.

The rowing events were held on the river Seine with controversy erupting during the single scull semi-finals. Saint-George Ashe of Great Britain rowed far enough out of his lane to interfere with Raymond Benoit during the heats. Despite this, Ashe was able to keep his victory in them. He failed to qualify in the semi-final; Ashe then contended he should still be allowed to continue on to the finals.

Both Gaudin and Barrelet objected to this and refused to participate further if Ashe was allowed to advance to the finals. Both men were able to be convinced to race against Ashe. Barrelet and Gaudin easily beat Ashe; Barrelet won the gold medal and Gaudin the silver, while Ashe placed third to receive a bronze medal.

== Sources ==
- Mallon, Bill (1997). The 1900 Olympic Games: Results for All Competitors in All Events, with Commentary. McFarland. ISBN 978-0-7864-4064-1.
