= Vedrenne =

Vedrenne is a surname. Notable people with the surname include:

- Antoine Védrenne (1878–1937), French rower
- John Eugene Vedrenne (1867–1930), British theatre producer
- Marie-Pierre Vedrenne (born 1982), French lawyer and politician
