= Maurits Verdonck =

Belgian rower and writer (1879–1968)

Personal information
- Born: Maurits August Verdonck; 21 April 1879 Ghent, Belgium
- Died: 1 March 1968 (aged 88) Gentbrugge, Belgium
- Occupation: Writer

Sport
- Sport: Rowing
- Club: KRCG, Gent
Medal record
Men's rowing
Representing Belgium
Olympic Games
Silver medal – second place	1900 Paris	Eight
European Rowing Championships
Gold medal – first place	1900 Paris	Eight

Maurits August Verdonck (21 April 1879 – 1 March 1968), often incorrectly referred to as Maurice, was a Belgian rower who competed in the 1900 Summer Olympics. He was part of the Belgian boat Royal Club Nautique de Gand, which won the silver medal in the men's eight.

Verdonck was also a writer. His work was part of the literature event in the art competition at the 1928 Summer Olympics.
