= Thomas Plesters =

Belgian rower

Medal record

Men's rowing
Gold medal – first place	2001	Eight Thames Challenge Cup

Thomas Plesters is a Belgian former rower from Gent near Brussels. He was stroke of the winning Thames Challenge Cup eight in 2001. After Oscar de Somville of the Royal Club Nautique de Gand in the early nineteenth century, he was the most important Belgian (stroke) of that club in the late 20th and early 21st century.

== Achievements ==
Henley Royal Regatta Thames Challenge Cup Gold
