= Daniel Clarembaux =

Belgian rower

Personal information
- Born: 5 January 1883 Molenbeek-Saint-Jean
- Died: 14 June 1928 (aged 45)

Sport
- Sport: Rowing
- Club: CRB, Bruxelles
Medal record
Men's rowing
Representing Belgium
European Rowing Championships
Silver medal – second place	1901 Zürich	Double scull
Gold medal – first place	1902 Strasbourg	Double scull
Gold medal – first place	1903 Venice	Double scull
Silver medal – second place	1904 Paris	Double scull
Silver medal – second place	1907 Strasbourg	Double scull
Gold medal – first place	1909 Paris	Double scull
Silver medal – second place	1920 Mâcon	Eight

Daniel Joseph Clarembaux (5 January 1883 – 14 June 1928) was a Belgian rower. He competed at the 1920 Summer Olympics in Antwerp with the men's eight where they were eliminated in round one.
