= Robert d'Heilly =

French rower

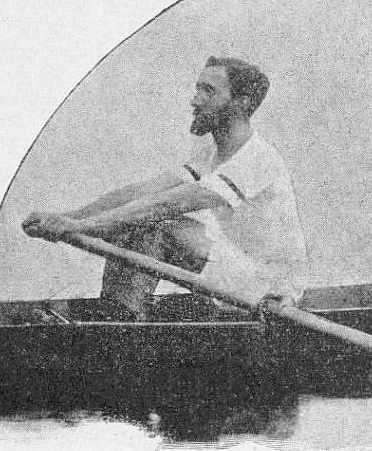

Personal information
- Full name: Robert Marie Joseph Émile Henri Eugène d'Heilly
- Born: 17 June 1876 Paris, France
- Died: 31 October 1953 (aged 77) Asnières-sur-Seine, France
- Height: 170 cm (5 ft 7 in)

Sport
- Sport: Rowing
- Club: Racing Club de France, Paris
Medal record
Men's rowing
Representing France
European Rowing Championships
| Gold medal – first place | 1901 Zürich | Double sculls |
| Silver medal – second place | 1902 Strasbourg | Double sculls |
| Gold medal – first place | 1903 Venice | Single sculls |
| Bronze medal – third place | 1903 Venice | Double sculls |

Robert Marie Joseph Émile Henri Eugène d'Heilly (17 June 1876 – 31 October 1953) was a French rower. He competed in the men's single sculls event at the 1900 Summer Olympics.
