= Marcel Van Crombrugge =

Belgian rower (1880–1940)

Personal information
- Born: Marcel Lucien Charles Van Crombrugge; 13 September 1880 Ghent, Belgium
- Died: 23 September 1940 (aged 60) Ghent, Belgium

Sport
- Sport: Rowing
- Club: KRCG, Gent
Medal record
Men's rowing
Representing Belgium
Olympic Games
Silver medal – second place	1900 Paris	Eight
European Rowing Championships
Silver medal – second place	1900 Paris	Coxed pair
Gold medal – first place	1900 Paris	Coxed four
Gold medal – first place	1900 Paris	Eight
Gold medal – first place	1901 Zürich	Eight
Gold medal – first place	1902 Strasbourg	Coxed pair
Bronze medal – third place	1902 Strasbourg	Coxed four
Gold medal – first place	1902 Strasbourg	Eight
Gold medal – first place	1906 Pallanza	Eight

Marcel Lucien Charles Van Crombrugge (13 September 1880 – 23 September 1940) was a Belgian rower who competed in the 1900 Summer Olympics. He was part of the Belgian boat Royal Club Nautique de Gand, which won the silver medal in the men's eight.
