= Edwin Hedley =

American rower (1864–1947)

Medal record

Men's rowing

Representing the United States

Olympic Games
Gold medal – first place	1900 Paris	Men's eight

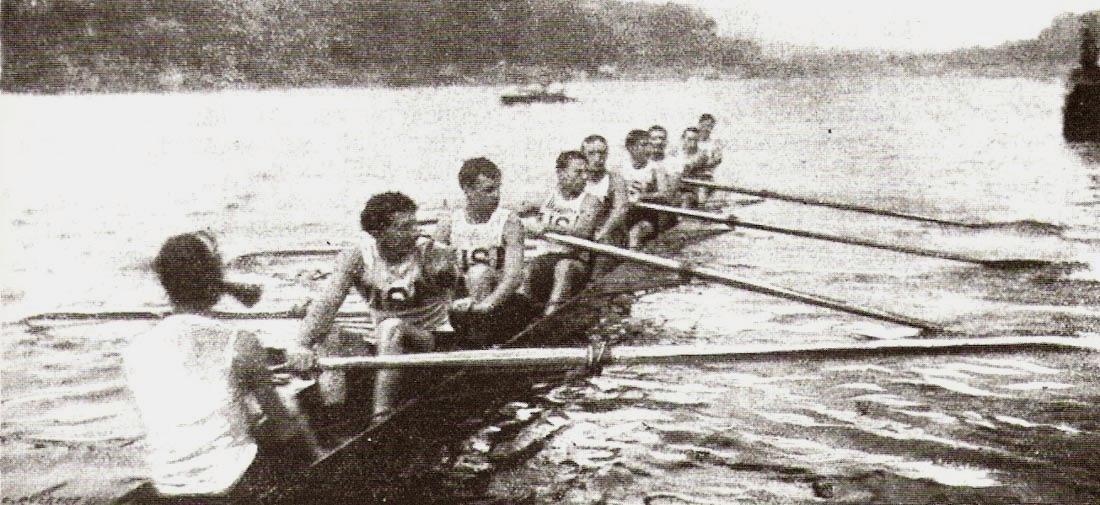

Edwin P. Hedley (July 23, 1864 in Philadelphia, Pennsylvania – May 22, 1947 in Philadelphia, Pennsylvania) was an American rower who competed in the 1900 Summer Olympics. He was a member of the American crew of the Vesper Boat Club, which won the gold medal in the men's eight.
