= Unknown French boy =

Unidentified Olympic coxswain

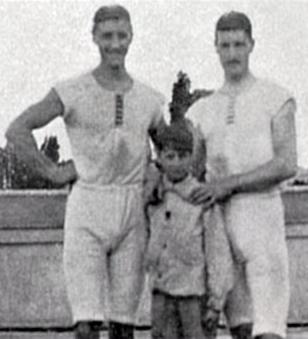
- The unidentified Olympian between his teammates François Brandt (left) and Roelof Klein (right) after winning their competition

Personal information
- Nationality: Possibly French

Sport
- Sport: Rowing
- Position: Coxswain
- Event: Men's coxed pair
- Team: (International Olympic Committee) Mixed team
- Partners: François Brandt; Roelof Klein
Medal record
Gold medal – first place	1900 Paris	Rowing

An "unknown French boy" is recorded to have participated as the replacement coxswain for the gold-winning (Note: Olympic medals were not awarded in all events at the 1900 Summer Olympics, but competitors from this period are retroactively categorized by medals corresponding to their placement. The team was actually awarded a bronze statue titled La Chanson.) mixed team (which was the Dutch team prior to his joining) in the men's coxed pair rowing competition at the 1900 Summer Olympics. Believed to possibly be the youngest Olympic medalist in history, the identity of the boy remains unknown and has been the subject of investigation for many years. Despite being referred to as the "unknown French boy" in Olympic archives, his nationality is not known with certainty.

== 1900 Summer Olympics ==
The Dutch coxed pair rowing team initially participated with an adult coxswain named Hermanus Brockmann, but after being defeated by a French boat in the qualifying heat, they realized that having three adults in the boat made it too heavy. Before the final, the rowers François Brandt and Roelof Klein randomly chose a child from the Parisian crowd to be their new coxswain. The boy was so light that they had to add a weight to the boat for it to maintain balance with Brandt and Klein. The lighter weight of the boy contributed to the team winning the race, beating the French second-place boat by two-tenths of a second. After winning, the three posed for a photograph before the boy disappeared back into the crowd.

Olympic historians believe the boy was around eight years old when he participated in the 1900 Olympics, which would make him the youngest Olympic champion in history. Some researchers, such as Dutch historian Ton Bijkerk, believe that he was twelve or thirteen years old at the time.

== Identity ==
Historian Hilary Evans described the identity of the boy as "the biggest Olympics mystery of all", while David Wallechinsky called it "the great mystery of Olympic history". In the IOC Historical Archives of the Olympic Studies Centre in Lausanne, he is never mentioned by name, instead being consistently listed as the "unknown French boy". The only known photograph of the boy was discovered by Bijkerk, who spent nearly fifty years trying to uncover his identity. The photo was discovered in a memorial photo book that belonged to Brandt. Bill Mallon, the official historian of the United States Olympic & Paralympic Committee, studied various French and German rowing magazines from the 1900s; none of these sources mention the coxswain. He also interviewed the daughter of Klein in the 1980s, but she said that her father never spoke of the boy.

According to Stan Greenberg's Olympic Almanack, the boy is claimed to have been named Marcel Depaillé, although the author notes that this is an unsubstantiated rumour and that "no one knows where it came from". In a 2014 article for the Dutch magazine De Sportwereld, Bijkerk speculated that the boy may have been a member of the Basse Seine Rowing Society in France. Evans speculated, on the basis of visual resemblance, that the boy may have been Belgian Olympian Alfred Van Landeghem, although he admitted that the evidence supporting this hypothesis was "circumstantial at best".

In 2016, Georgian historian Paata Natsvlishvili hypothesized that the coxswain was not French at all, but actually a Georgian boy named Giorgi Nikoladze who had been touring Europe with his family at the time of the 1900 Summer Olympics. According to Natsvlishvili, Giorgi's sister Rusudana Nikoladze had told him in 1978 that her brother had won a boat race in France during that period. As an adult, Giorgi Nikoladze became a mathematician, a metallurgist, and a professor at Tbilisi State University. Several historians from the International Society of Olympic Historians remained unconvinced that Nikoladze was really the unknown coxswain owing to the circumstantial evidence. Bill Mallon said that the unknown boy looked "a little" like Nikoladze.
