= Ernst Jencquel =

German rower

Personal information
- Full name: Ernst Ascan Jencquel
- Born: 11 January 1879; Hamburg, German Empire
- Died: 27 December 1939 (aged 60); Hamburg, Nazi Germany

Sport
- Sport: Rowing

Ernst Ascan Jencquel (11 January 1879 – 27 December 1939) was a German rower. He competed in the men's eight event at the 1900 Summer Olympics.
