= Prosper Bruggeman =

Belgian rower (1870–1939)

Personal information
- Full name: Prosper Jan Bruggeman
- Born: 14 March 1870 Ledeberg, Belgium
- Died: 6 March 1939 (aged 68) Gentbrugge, Belgium

Sport
- Sport: Rowing
- Club: KRCG, Gent
Medal record
Men's rowing
Representing Belgium
Olympic Games
Silver medal – second place	1900 Paris	Eight
European Rowing Championships
Bronze medal – third place	1894 Mâcon	Eight
Silver medal – second place	1896 Geneva	Eight
Gold medal – first place	1898 Turin	Eight
Gold medal – first place	1899 Ostend	Double scull
Gold medal – first place	1899 Ostend	Eight
Silver medal – second place	1900 Paris	Double scull
Gold medal – first place	1900 Paris	Coxed four
Gold medal – first place	1900 Paris	Eight
Bronze medal – third place	1902 Strasbourg	Coxed four
Gold medal – first place	1902 Strasbourg	Eight

Prosper Jan Bruggeman (14 March 1870 – 6 March 1939) was a Belgian rower who competed in the 1900 Summer Olympics. He was part of the Belgian boat Royal Club Nautique de Gand, which won the silver medal in the men's eight.
