= Henricus Tromp =

Dutch rower

Olympic medal record

Men's rowing
Bronze medal – third place	1900 Paris	Eight

Henrikus Tromp (19 March 1878 in Tandjoeng Poera, Dutch East Indies – 17 April 1962 in Etterbeek, Belgium) was a Dutch rower who competed in the 1900 Summer Olympics. He legally changed his name to Henrikus Van Hettinga Tromp in 1925.

He was part of the Dutch boat Minerva Amsterdam, which won the bronze medal in the eight event.
