= Alexander Gleichmann von Oven Jr. =

German rower

Personal information
- Born: 15 April 1879; Hamburg, German Empire
- Died: 3 September 1969 (aged 90); Hamburg, West Germany

Sport
- Sport: Rowing

Alexander Gleichmann von Oven Jr. (15 April 1879 – 3 September 1969) was a German rower. He competed in the men's eight event at the 1900 Summer Olympics.
