= Edward Marsh (rower) =

American rower (1874–1932)

Medal record

Men's rowing

Representing the United States

Olympic Games
Gold medal – first place	1900 Paris	Men's eight

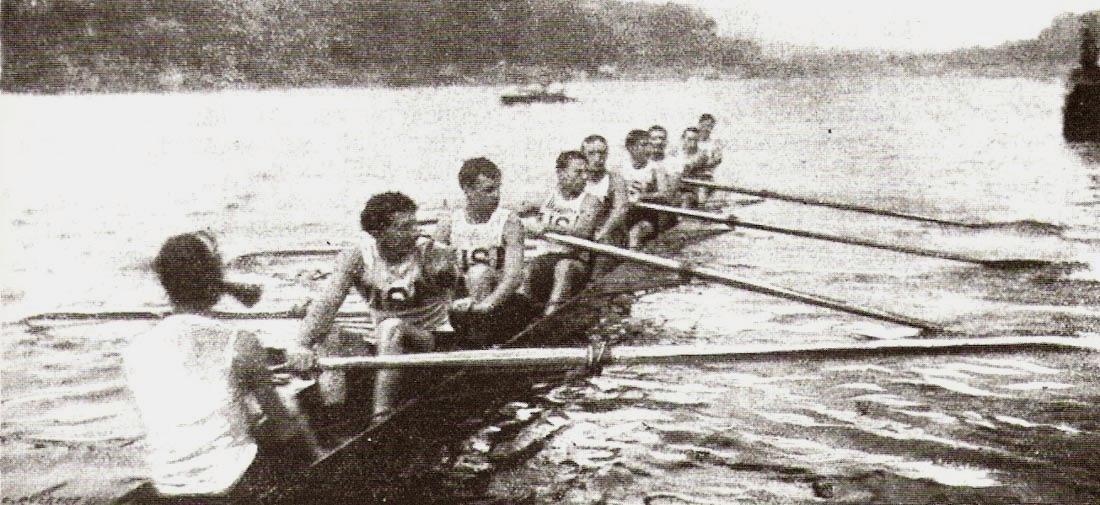
A photo of the Rowing men's right 1900.

Edward Marsh (February 12, 1874 in Philadelphia – October 10, 1932 in Philadelphia) was an American rower who competed in the 1900 Summer Olympics.

A member of the Penn Athletic Club Rowing Association in Philadelphia, he was part of the American boat Vesper Boat Club, which won the gold medal in the eights. He was a member of the Theta Delta Chi Fraternity.
