= 1897 European Rowing Championships =

- Venue: Lake Maggiore
- Location: Pallanza, Italy
- Dates: 8 September 1897

The 1897 European Rowing Championships were rowing championships held on Lake Maggiore in the Italian commune of Pallanza on 8 September. The competition was for men only, four nations competed (Belgium, France, Italy, and Switzerland), and the regatta had four boat classes (M1x, M2+, M4+, M8+). At the FISA Congress held on the same day as these championships, it was decided that the double scull boat class would be introduced in the following year.

== Event schedule ==
Four races took place on 8 September 1897. As only four nations competed, no heats had to be rowed. The regatta used a 2000 m course:

- 3pm: French Cup (Coxed four)
- 4pm: Belgian Cup (Single scull)
- 5pm: Adriatic Cup (Coxed pair)
- 6pm: Italian Cup (Eight)

== Medal summary ==
Event	Gold		Silver		Bronze	
Event	Country & rowers	Time	Country & rowers	Time	Country & rowers	Time
M1x	Belgium (Note: Club Nautique de Gand); Joseph Deleplanque	8'55"	Italy (Note: Società Canottieri Cerea (Turin)); Fiorenzo Pagliano	9'12"5	(Note: The French rower (Carlos Deltour) did not finish and the Swiss rower (G. Pfyffer) had withdrawn before the start.)	
M2+ (Note: Only three countries competed in this event.)	Belgium (Note: Cercle des Régates de Bruxelles); Edouard Lescrauwaet; Eugène Govaerts	8'36"	France (Note: Club Nautique de Castillon); Carlos Deltour; Antoine Védrenne; Dubordieu (cox)	8'50"5	Italy (Note: Società Canottieri Milano); Boldoni de Marchi; G. Pucci (cox)	8'58"
M4+	Belgium (Note: Royal Sport Nautique de Bruxelles); François Goossens; François Jansen; Léopold De Bloe; Georges Boisson	7'46"	Italy (Note: S.C. il remo di Livorno); Ezio Carlesi; Silvio Slettini; Ettore Sebastiani; Alberto Bertolani	7'52"	France (Note: Union Nautique de Lyon); Laurent; Guillon; Merat; J. Lelarge	n/a (Note: The French boat had abandoned the race but after the Swiss boat from Seeclub Zürich also abandoned, the French resumed and crossed the finish line.)
M8+ (Note: Only three countries competed in this event.)	Belgium (Note: Club Nautique de Gand + Cercle des Régates de Bruxelles)} Edouard Lescrauwaet; Eugène Govaerts; Adolphe Lippens; Maurice Hemelsoet; Charles Malis; Charles Van Weddingen; Arthur De Meyer; Louis Lys	6'43"	Italy (Note: Libertas di Firenze (Florence)); Ernesto Vettori; Italo Ponis; Cino Ceni; Alberto Grazzini; Ottorino Castagnoli; Giorgio Bensa; Giuseppe Belli; Cesare Galardelli; G. Pucci (cox)	6'44"5	France (Note: Émulation nautique Boulogne Club (now L'Aviron Boulonnais)); Deguine; Maurice Carton; Émile Lejeune; Gadebled; Maurice Henon van Heeckoet; Henon; P. van Heeckoet	6'47"
