= Paul Cocuet =

French rower

Personal information
- Nationality: French
- Born: 16 August 1869
- Died: Unknown

Sport
- Sport: Rowing
Medal record
Men's rowing
Representing France
European Rowing Championships
| Gold medal – first place | 1894 Mâcon | Coxed four |
| Gold medal – first place | 1894 Mâcon | Eight |
| Gold medal – first place | 1895 Ostend | Coxed four |
| Gold medal – first place | 1895 Ostend | Eight |

Paul Cocuet (born 16 August 1869, date of death unknown) was a French rower. He competed in two events at the 1900 Summer Olympics.
