= William Carr (rower) =

American rower (1876–1942)

Olympic medal record

Men's rowing

Representing the United States
Gold medal – first place	1900 Paris	Eight

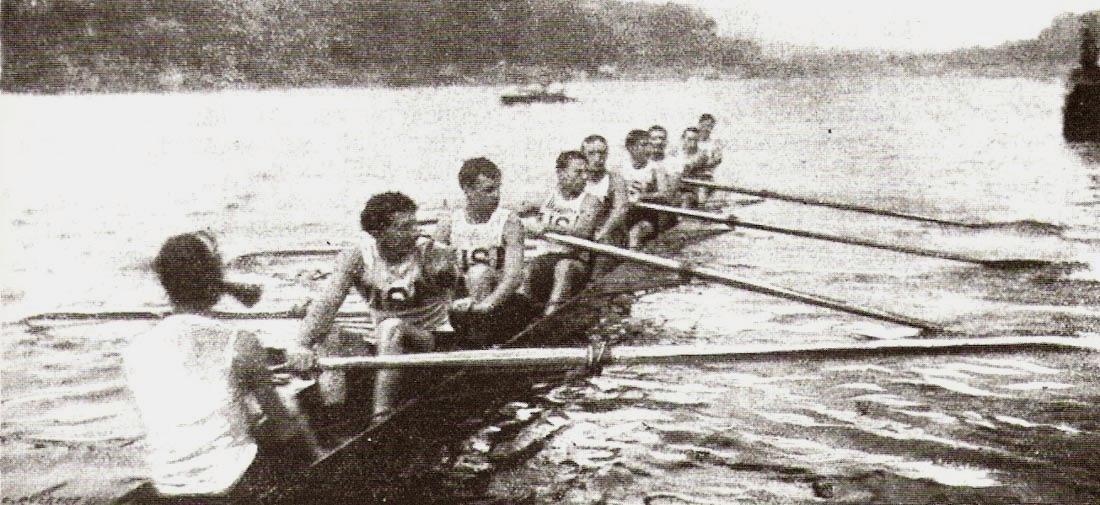
United States men's eight team at the 1900 Games

William John Carr (June 17, 1876 in County Donegal – March 25, 1942 in Philadelphia) was an American rower who competed in the 1900 Summer Olympics. He was part of the American boat Vesper Boat Club, which won the gold medal in the eights.
