= Harry DeBaecke =

American rower (1879–1961)

Olympic medal record

Men's rowing

Representing the United States
Gold medal – first place	1900 Paris	Men's eight

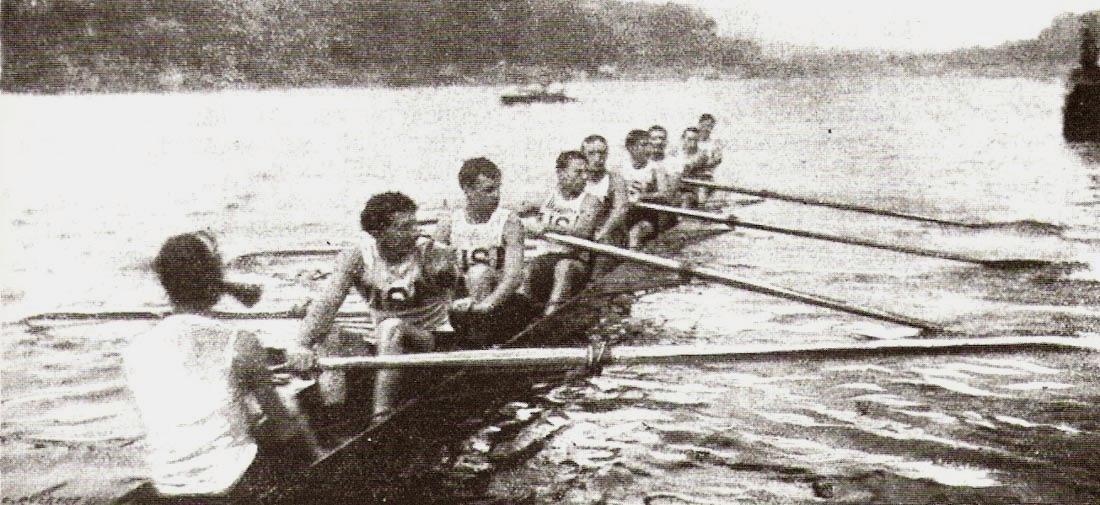
Rowing mens eight USA 1900.jpg

Harry Leopold DeBaecke (June 9, 1879 – November 6, 1961) was an American rower who competed in the 1900 Summer Olympics.

He was born to Henry DeBaecke (1830-1910) and Octavia Slembrouck (1846-1889) in Philadelphia, Pennsylvania. He had an older sister named Annie. He was part of the American Vesper Boat Club, which won the gold medal in the eights at the 1900 Paris Olympics. At the time, he was 21 and the youngest member of the team. In 1903, he married Carolyn May. He had two children: Harry and Cecelia. He died on November 6, 1961, in Philadelphia at the age of 82.
