= Roscoe Lockwood =

American rower (1875–1960)

Medal record

Men's rowing

Representing the United States

Olympic Games
Gold medal – first place	1900 Paris	Men's eight

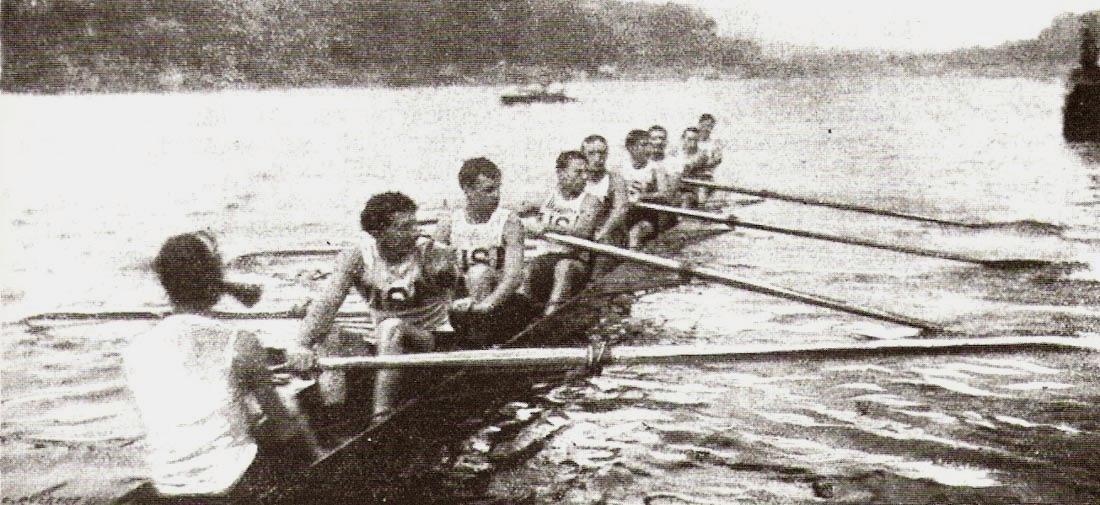

Roscoe Conkling Lockwood (November 22, 1875 – November 24, 1960) was an American rower who competed in the 1900 Summer Olympics. He was born in Upper Pittsgrove Township, New Jersey and died in Moorestown, New Jersey. Lockwood was part of the American boat Vesper Boat Club, which won the gold medal in the eights.
