= Edgar Katzenstein =

German rower

Personal information
- Nationality: German
- Born: 26 November 1879; Lisbon, Portugal
- Died: 17 July 1953 (aged 73); Hamburg, West Germany

Sport
- Sport: Rowing

Edgar Katzenstein (26 November 1879 – 17 July 1953) was a German rower. He competed in the men's eight event at the 1900 Summer Olympics.
