= Antoine Védrenne =

French rower (1878–1937)

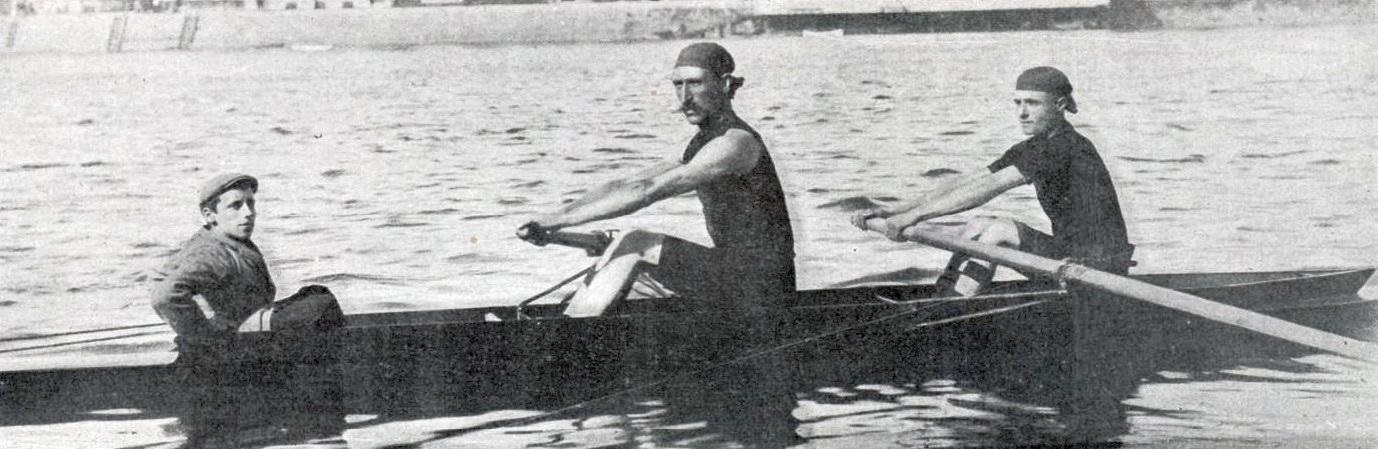
- Carlos Deltour (G.) and Antoine Védrenne (D.), from the Rowing Club de Castillon, champions of Europe and France in 1899.

Personal information
- Born: 17 September 1878 Castillon-la-Bataille, France
- Died: 13 January 1937 (aged 58) Castillon-la-Bataille, France

Sport
- Sport: Rowing
- Club: Rowing Club Castillon, Castillon-la-Bataille
Medal record
Men's rowing
Representing France
Olympic Games
| Bronze medal – third place | 1900 Paris | Coxed pair |
European Rowing Championships
| Silver medal – second place | 1897 Pallanza | Coxed pair |
| Gold medal – first place | 1899 Ostend | Coxed pair |
| Gold medal – first place | 1900 Paris | Double scull |
| Bronze medal – third place | 1903 Venice | Eight |

Antoine "Erneste" Védrenne (17 September 1878 – 13 January 1937) was a French rower who competed in the 1900 Summer Olympics.

He was part of the French boat Rowing Club Castillon, which won the bronze medal in the coxed pair.
