= Ruurd Leegstra =

Dutch rower

Olympic medal record

Men's rowing
Bronze medal – third place	1900 Paris	Eight

Ruurd Gerbens Leegstra (29 June 1877 in Wonokesoemo, Dutch East Indies – 17 January 1933 in Utrecht) was a Dutch rower who competed in the 1900 Summer Olympics.

He was part of the Dutch boat Minerva Amsterdam, which won the bronze medal in the eights.
