= Édouard Dammann =

French rower

Personal information
- Nationality: French

Sport
- Sport: Rowing

Édouard Dammann was a French rower. He competed in the men's single sculls event at the 1900 Summer Olympics.
