= John Geiger (rower) =

American rower (1873–1956)

Medal record

Men's rowing

Representing the United States

Olympic Games
Gold medal – first place	1900 Paris	Eight

John Francis Geiger (March 28, 1873 in Philadelphia – December 6, 1956 in Philadelphia) was an American rower who competed in the 1900 Summer Olympics. He was part of the American boat Vesper Boat Club, which won the gold medal in the eights. He played American football for the Latrobe Athletic Association in 1898 and 1900.
