= Walter Middelberg =

Dutch rower (1875–1944)

Olympic medal record

Men's rowing
Bronze medal – third place	1900 Paris	Eight

Walter Middelberg (30 January 1875, in Zwolle – 15 September 1944, in Zwolle) was a Dutch rower who competed in the 1900 Summer Olympics.

He was part of the Dutch boat Minerva Amsterdam, which won the bronze medal in the eight event.
