= 1894 European Rowing Championships =

- Venue: Saône
- Location: Mâcon, France
- Dates: 16 September 1894

The 1894 European Rowing Championships were rowing championships held on the Saône in the French city Mâcon on 16 September. The competition was for men only, and the regatta had four boat classes (M1x, M2+, M4+, M8+). This was the second edition of the European Rowing Championships and the first time that the coxed pair boat class was included.

At the FISA Congress held on 15 September, five federations were represented.

== Event schedule ==
FISA, the International Rowing Federation, had been founded in 1892 and one of the motivations for having the body is to standardise the rules of racing which varied greatly, even within countries. Race distances were variable. The 1894 European Rowing Championships were raced over a 2000 m distance for all four boat classes; it just so happened that the available straight on the Saône allowed for this race distance. Nevertheless, this became the standard race distance and the 1894 Championships are credited with having set this distance.

Four races took place on 16 September 1894. As only four teams competed, no heats had to be rowed. The teams represented France, Italy and Belgium. In addition, there was a team from Trieste. That city had only just (in 1891) lost its status as a free port and belonged to the Austria-Hungarian Empire. Contemporary sources list Trieste as being represented rather than Austria-Hungary. A rowing union had formed in Trieste and the decision had been made to send a coxed four to France. There were four rowing clubs competing for the honour to represent the port city. Three regattas were held during August that were all won by the team from Ginnastica.

- Adriatic Cup (Coxed pair)
- French Cup (Coxed four)
- Belgian Cup (Single scull)
- Italian Cup (Eight)

== Medal summary ==
Event	Gold		Silver		Bronze	
Event	Country & rowers	Time	Country & rowers	Time	Country & rowers	Time
M1x	France; Gresset		Italy; Vittorio Leone		Belgium; Edouard Lescrauwaet	
M2+	Belgium; Edouard Lescrauwaet; Auguste Lescrauwaet		Italy; Vittorio Leone; Federico Costa		France (Note: The source does not list the names of the team members.)	
M4+	France; Jules Démaré; Dorlia; Paul Cocuet; Gabriel Sartori		Italy; Luigi Rossi; Giuseppe Gribaudi; Ferruccio Somaglia; Attilio Chiantore		(Austria-Hungary) Trieste; Dante Sandinelli; Ugo Bonazza; Guido Calzabar; Ermanno Girardelli	
M8+	France; Jules Démaré; Dorlia; Paul Cocuet; Gabriel Sartori; E. Lepron; Dupont; Sablier; Dupont		Italy; Luigi Rossi; Giuseppe Gribaudi; Ferruccio Somaglia; Augusto Lange; Carlo Carbone; Mario Ostorero; Giovanni Lenti; Attilio Chiantore		Belgium; Louis Choisy; Paul de Gottal; Octave Schepens; Léonce Roels; Raymond Roels; Gustave Brandes; Prosper Bruggeman; Victor De Bisschop van Hemelberghe (cox)	
