= Theodor Lauezzari =

German rower (1880–?)

Personal information
- Full name: August Theodor Lauezzari
- Born: 18 May 1880 Hamburg, German Empire

Sport
- Sport: Rowing

August Theodor Lauezzari (18 May 1880 – ?) was a German rower. He competed in the men's eight event at the 1900 Summer Olympics.

Lauezzari was born to Theodor Lauezzari and Agnes Courvoisier. He had a younger brother, Alphons Courvoisier Lauezzari (1882–1946). He married Theresa MacNeill in 1924, in Montreal.
