= Hendrik Offerhaus =

Dutch rower

Hendrik Karel Offerhaus
- Born: 20 May 1875; Venhuizen, Netherlands
- Died: 2 September 1953 (aged 78); Wassenaar, Netherlands
- Education: University of Leiden
- Occupation: Doctor

Olympic medal record

Men's rowing
| Bronze medal – third place | 1900 Paris | Eight |

Hendrik Karel Offerhaus (20 May 1875 – 2 September 1953) was a Dutch medical doctor and rower who competed in the 1900 Summer Olympics. He was part of the Dutch boat Minerva Amsterdam, which finished third in the eight event.

After completing his medical studies, he worked as a surgeon in The Hague, Groningen and Deventer among others. In Deventer he became involved with the Dutch Red Cross. During the Balkan War in 1913, he worked with the Dutch Red Cross in Greece. In 1931, he gave up his surgical practice in order to devote himself fully to the Red Cross. He later became secretary-general of the Dutch Red Cross.
