= Lucien Martinet =

French rower

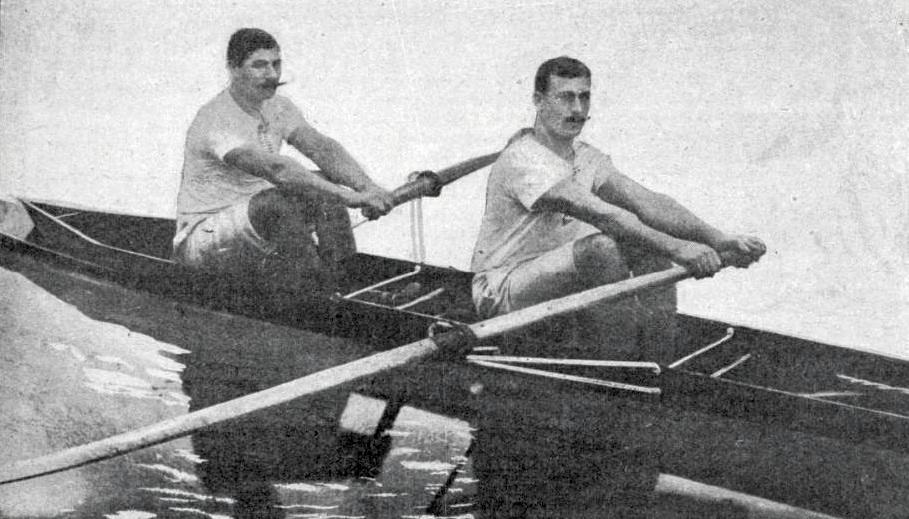

Personal information
- Nationality: French
- Born: 1878
- Died: Unknown

Sport
- Sport: Rowing
- Club: Société Nautique de la Marne
Medal record
Men's rowing
Representing France
Olympic Games
Silver medal – second place	1900 Paris	Coxed pair
European Rowing Championships
Gold medal – first place	1898 Turin	Double scull
Gold medal – first place	1900 Paris	Coxed pair

Lucien Martinet (born 1878, date of death unknown) was a French rower who competed in the 1900 Summer Olympics.

He was a member of the French club Société Nautique de la Marne and his team won the silver medal in the coxed pair.
