= Walter Thijssen =

Dutch rower

Olympic medal record

Men's rowing
Bronze medal – third place	1900 Paris	Eight

Walter Meijer Timmerman Thijssen (28 September 1877 in Yogyakarta, Dutch East Indies – 3 July 1943 in Hilversum) was a Dutch rower who competed in the 1900 Summer Olympics.

He was part of the Dutch boat Minerva Amsterdam, which won the bronze medal in the eight event.
