= Gordon Love (rower) =

French rower

Personal information
- Full name: Gordon Frederick Love
- Born: 23 December 1873; Paris, France

Sport
- Sport: Rowing

Gordon Frederick Love (born 23 December 1873, date of death unknown) was a French rower. He competed in the men's coxed pair event at the 1900 Summer Olympics.
