= 1895 European Rowing Championships =

- Venue: Bruges–Ostend Canal
- Location: Ostend, Belgium
- Dates: 15 September 1895

The 1895 European Rowing Championships were rowing championships held on the Bruges–Ostend Canal in the Belgian city of Ostend on 15 September. The competition was for men only, and the regatta had four boat classes (M1x, M2+, M4+, M8+).

At the FISA Congress held on 14 and 15 September, five nations were represented.

== Medal summary ==
Event	Gold		Silver		Bronze	
Event	Country & rowers	Time	Country & rowers	Time	Country & rowers	Time
M1x	Belgium; Friedrich Miller (Note: Miller was a German from Ulm but he started for Royal Sport Nautique de Bruxelles.)		Italy; Vittorio Leone		Austria-Hungary; Jaroslav Langhaus	
M2+	France; Jules Démaré; Gabriel Sartori		Belgium; Edouard Lescrauwaet; Auguste Lescrauwaet		Italy; Vittorio Leone; Federico Costa	
M4+	France; Jules Démaré; Joyet; Paul Cocuet; Gabriel Sartori		Belgium; Edouard Lescrauwaet; Auguste Lescrauwaet; Charles Lescrauwaet; Jules Lescrauwaet		Italy; Ettore Sebastiani; Fortunato Barbini; Alfonso Taddei; Ezio Carlesi; Gragnani (cox)	
M8+	France; Jules Démaré; Joyet; Paul Cocuet; Gabriel Sartori; Dirauer; Dupont; Jacques Jansen; Chaigneau		Belgium; François Goossens; François Jansen; Léon Dickman; Jean Troch; Edmond Nolf; Victor Herickx; Léopold De Bloe; Georges Boisson		Italy; Ernesto Vettori; Italo Ponis; Cino Ceni; Giuseppe Belli; Arturo Innocenti; Goretto Goretti; Giorgio Bensa; Cesare Galardelli; G. Pucci (cox)	
