= Roelof Klein =

Dutch rower (1877–1960)

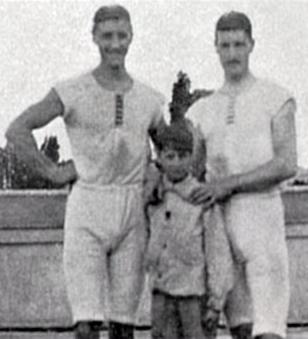
- François Brandt, Roelof Klein (right) and their coxswain at the 1900 Summer Olympics

Personal information
- Born: 7 June 1877 Lemmer, Netherlands
- Died: 12 February 1960 (aged 82) Montclair, New Jersey, U.S.

Sport
- Sport: Rowing
- Club: Laga, Delft
Medal record
Representing the Netherlands
Gold medal – first place	1900 Paris	Coxed pair
Bronze medal – third place	1900 Paris	Eight

Roelof Klein (7 June 1877 – 12 February 1960) was a Dutch rower who competed at the 1900 Summer Olympics in Paris. Klein was part of the Dutch eight team that won a bronze medal with Hermanus Brockmann as the coxswain. Brockmann also steered the boat of Klein and François Brandt in the coxed pairs semifinal, which they lost to France. The pair realized that the 60 kg weight of Brockmann puts them in disadvantage; they replaced him with a local boy of 33 kg and won the final, narrowly beating the French team.

Klein had a degree in mechanical engineering and worked abroad for the Shell company. In 1910 he emigrated to the United States and died there in 1960.
