= Oscar Dessomville =

Belgian rower (1876–1938)

Personal information
- Born: Oscar Charles Dessomville; 19 August 1876 Ghent, Belgium
- Died: 30 August 1938 (aged 62) Ghent, Belgium
- Height: 175 cm (5 ft 9 in)
- Weight: 78 kg (172 lb)

Sport
- Sport: Rowing
- Club: Royal Club Nautique de Gand
Medal record
Men's rowing
Representing Belgium
Olympic Games
Silver medal – second place	1900 Paris	Eight
Silver medal – second place	1908 London	Eight
European Rowing Championships
Silver medal – second place	1900 Paris	Coxed pair
Gold medal – first place	1900 Paris	Coxed four
Gold medal – first place	1900 Paris	Eight
Gold medal – first place	1901 Zürich	Eight
Gold medal – first place	1902 Strasbourg	Coxed pair
Bronze medal – third place	1902 Strasbourg	Coxed four
Gold medal – first place	1902 Strasbourg	Eight
Gold medal – first place	1906 Pallanza	Eight
Gold medal – first place	1907 Strasbourg	Eight
Silver medal – second place	1908 Lucerne	Coxed four
Gold medal – first place	1908 Lucerne	Eight
Silver medal – second place	1909 Paris	Coxed four

Oscar Charles Dessomville (19 August 1876 – 30 August 1938) was a Belgian rower who competed in the 1900 Summer Olympics and in the 1908 Summer Olympics.

In both 1900 and 1908 he was the only one with Rodolphe Poma, who was coxswain in 1900, who was both two times part of the Belgian boat Royal Club Nautique de Gand, which won the silver medal in the men's eight.
