= Maurice Hemelsoet =

Belgian rower

Personal information
- Born: Maurice Constant Maria Hemelsoet; 8 March 1875 Ghent, Belgium
- Died: 29 December 1943 (aged 68) Ghent, Belgium

Sport
- Sport: Rowing
- Club: KRCG, Gent
Medal record
Men's rowing
Representing Belgium
Olympic Games
Silver medal – second place	1900 Paris	Eight
European Rowing Championships
Gold medal – first place	1897 Pallanza	Eight
Gold medal – first place	1898 Turin	Coxed four
Gold medal – first place	1899 Ostend	Coxed four
Gold medal – first place	1899 Ostend	Eight
Gold medal – first place	1900 Paris	Coxed four
Gold medal – first place	1900 Paris	Eight
Gold medal – first place	1901 Zürich	Eight

Maurice Constant Maria Hemelsoet (8 March 1875 – 29 December 1943) was a Belgian rower and was part of the Royal Club Nautique de Gand which won a Silver medal in men's eight at the 1900 Summer Olympics in Paris.
