= François Brandt =

Dutch rower (1874–1949)

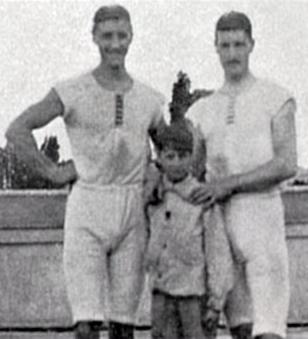
- François Brandt (left), Roelof Klein and their coxswain at the 1900 Olympics

Personal information
- Full name: François Antoine Brandt
- Born: 29 December 1874 Zoeterwoude, Netherlands
- Died: 4 July 1949 (aged 74) Naarden, Netherlands

Sport
- Sport: Rowing
- Club: Laga, Delft
Medal record
Representing the Netherlands
Gold medal – first place	1900 Paris	Coxed pair
Bronze medal – third place	1900 Paris	Eight

François Antoine Brandt (29 December 1874 – 4 July 1949) was a Dutch rower who competed at the 1900 Summer Olympics in Paris. Brandt was part of the Dutch eight team that won a bronze medal with Hermanus Brockmann as the coxswain. Brockmann also steered the boat of Brandt and Roelof Klein in the coxed pairs semifinal, which they lost to France. The pair realized that the 60 kg weight of Brockmann puts them in disadvantage; they replaced him with a local boy of 33 kg and won the final narrowly beating the French team.

Brandt had a degree in civil engineering and until 1938 worked for the Dutch railways. Later he became bishop for Belgium and Netherlands for the Liberal Catholic Church.
