= Johannes van Dijk =

Dutch rower (1868–1938)

Olympic medal record

Men's rowing

Representing the Netherlands
Bronze medal – third place	1900 Paris	Eight

Johannes Wilhelmus Maria van Dijk (4 July 1868 in Amsterdam – 25 August 1938 in Amsterdam) was a Dutch rower who competed in the 1900 Summer Olympics.

He was part of the Dutch boat Minerva Amsterdam, which won the bronze medal in the eight event.
