= 1902 European Rowing Championships =

- Venue: Rhine
- Location: Strasbourg or Kehl, German Empire
- Dates: late-August

The 1902 European Rowing Championships were rowing championships held on the Rhine on a day in the latter part of August. (Note: The FISA Congress was held on 23 August and this was always an event a day prior or after the championships.) Generally referred to as being held in Strasbourg, the International Rowing Federation website implies that the championships were based in Kehl on the opposite side of the Rhine to Strasbourg. Either way, both towns were at the time part of the German Empire. The competition was for men only and they competed in five boat classes (M1x, M2x, M2+, M4+, M8+).

== Medal summary ==
Event	Gold		Silver		Bronze	
Event	Country & rowers	Time	Country & rowers	Time	Country & rowers	Time
M1x	Italy; Luigi Gerli	8:51.4	Belgium; Theodore Conrades		Alsace-Lorraine; G. Bornet	
M2x	Belgium; Daniël Clarembaux; Georges Licot	7:41.6	France; Robert d'Heilly; O. Bouttemy		Alsace-Lorraine; G. Bornet; Charles Hahn	
M2+	Belgium; Marcel Van Crombrugge; Oscar Dessomville; Alfred Van Landeghem (cox)		Alsace-Lorraine (Note: The source does not list the names of the team members.)		France (Note: The source does not list the names of the team members.)	
M4+	France; G. Tollier; L. Henry; A. Henry; L. Beauchamp; Belfort (cox)		Italy; Paolo Diana; Giuseppe Nacci; Gaetano Caccavallo; Vittorio Narducci; Clementino Sbisà (cox)		Belgium; Marcel Van Crombrugge; Oscar Dessomville; Prosper Bruggeman; Gaston Goetgeluck	
M8+	Belgium; Marcel Van Crombrugge; Oscar Dessomville; Prosper Bruggeman; Gaston Goetgeluck; Georges Demeester; Oscar Taelman; Albert Verdonck; Eugène Picha; Alfred Van Landeghem (cox)		France (Note: The source does not list the names of the team members.)		(Note: The source does not specify whether there were only two competitors or whether the bronze medal winner is missing from the results list.)	
