= 1903 European Rowing Championships =

- Venue: Giudecca Canal
- Location: Giudecca, Venice, Italy
- Dates: mid-August

The 1903 European Rowing Championships were rowing championships held in Giudecca, an island in the Venetian Lagoon, on the Giudecca Canal on a day in the middle of August. (Note: The FISA Congress was held on 16 August and this was always an event a day prior or after the championships. A photo showing rowing spectators in front of Le Zitelle is in circulation with a date of 23 August 1903 and this refers to the publication date in L'Illustrazione Italiana rather than the day the photo was taken.) The competition was for men only and they competed in five boat classes (M1x, M2x, M2+, M4+, M8+).

== Medal summary ==
Event	Gold		Silver		Bronze	
Event	Country & rowers	Time	Country & rowers	Time	Country & rowers	Time
M1x	France; Robert d'Heilly		Belgium; Xavier Crombet		Switzerland; Georg Eidenbenz	
M2x	Belgium; Daniël Clarembaux; Xavier Crombet		Italy; Luigi Gerli; Emilio Sacchini		France; Robert d'Heilly; Jacques Jansen	
M2+	Belgium; Guillaume Visser; Urbain Molmans; Rodolphe Colpaert (cox)		France; Beurrier; Émile Lejeune		Alsace-Lorraine; Charles Engel; Charles Muhlberger; A. Knoch (cox)	
M4+	Belgium; Guillaume Visser; Urbain Molmans; Victor Van Acker; Ernest Tralbaut; Rodolphe Colpaert (cox)		France; Raymondi; Vuillier; Bastoner; Jean Reverchon		Italy; Paolo Diana; Vittorio Narducci; Gaetano Caccavallo; Giuseppe Nacci; Lisona (cox)	
M8+	Belgium; Guillaume Visser; Urbain Molmans; Victor van Acker; Ernest Tralbaut; Henri De Beuckelaer; Alphonse Hoge; Paul Jaxx; Georges Van Huffel; Rodolphe Colpaert (cox)		Italy; Giorgio Bensa; Gino Montelatici; Cino Ceni; Guglielmo Ously; Mario Piattoli; Valente Cappelli; Raffaello Baldi; Vittorio Parrini		France; Carlos Deltour; Alibert; Champagne; Valmy; Lemaitre; Antoine Védrenne; Fournier; Vincendau	
