= 1896 European Rowing Championships =

- Venue: Lake Geneva
- Location: Geneva, Switzerland
- Dates: 6 September 1896

The 1896 European Rowing Championships were rowing championships held on Lake Geneva in the Swiss city of Geneva on 6 September. The competition was for men only, five nations competed (Austria-Hungary, Belgium, France, Italy, and Switzerland), and the regatta had four boat classes (M1x, M2+, M4+, M8+). At the FISA Congress held on the same day as these championships, four nations were represented.

== Event schedule ==
Four races took place on 6 September 1896. As only five nations competed, no heats had to be rowed. The regatta used a 2000 m course:

- 2.30pm: French Cup (Coxed four)
- 3.30pm: Belgian Cup (Single scull)
- 4.30pm: Adriatic Cup (Coxed pair)
- 5.30pm: Italian Cup (Eight)

== Medal summary ==
The following medals were won:

Event	Gold		Silver		Bronze	
Event	Country & rowers	Time	Country & rowers	Time	Country & rowers	Time
M1x (Note: The competitor from the Société nautique de la Marne did not finish)	Switzerland; Ben Longchamp (Note: Rowing Club de Lausanne)	?	Italy; Vittorio Leone (Note: Rowing Club of Genoa)	+13"	Austria-Hungary; Jaroslav Langhaus (Note: Velarki-Club Slavia in Prague)	?
M2+ (Note: The boat from the See-Club of Zurich came fourth)	Belgium (Note: Société royale nautique d'Anvers); Marcel Nisol; Edmond Delaet	9'40"	France (Note: La Société nautique de Marne et le Rowing-Gluli français); Jules Demaré; Jamen	9'49"2	Italy (Note: La Société Litertas de Florence); Cino Ceni; Giuseppe Belli; G. Pucci (cox)	10'49"
M4+ (Note: Rowing Club de Lausanne came fourth)	France (Note: Société de "l'Aviron de Marseillan"); Delfieu; Boudou (Note: Reported in Le Gaulois as "Fayet"); Mallet; Pentoux (Note: Reported in Le Gaulois as "Penloux")	8'33"2	Belgium (Note: Sport nautique belge); François Goossens; François Jansen; Léopold De Bloe; Georges Boisson	8'46"	Italy (Note: Club of Livourne); Ezio Carlesi; Silvio Slettini; Alberto Bertolani; Attilio Balena; Gragnani (cox)	n/a
M8+	France (Note: Club nautique de Lyon); Laurent; J. Lelarge; Joseph Guillon; Dachin (Note: Reported by Sport Komplett as "Daclin"); Mérat; Descotes (Note: Reported by Sport Komplett as "Descottes"); Luyton; Petavy	7'52"	Belgium; Louis Choisy; Gustave Brandes; Octave Schepens; Léonce Roels; Henri de Keyser; Isidore Devriendt; Prosper Bruggeman; Victor De Bisschop; Jean Dewitte (cox)	8'0"8	Italy; Arturo Masciardi; Giuseppe de Col; Italo Bernasconi; Antonio Bianchi; Tommaso Padovani; Miro Masciardi; Arnaldo Padovani; Luigi Riva; G. Pucci (cox)	8'10"8
