= Hermann Barrelet =

French rower (1879–1964)

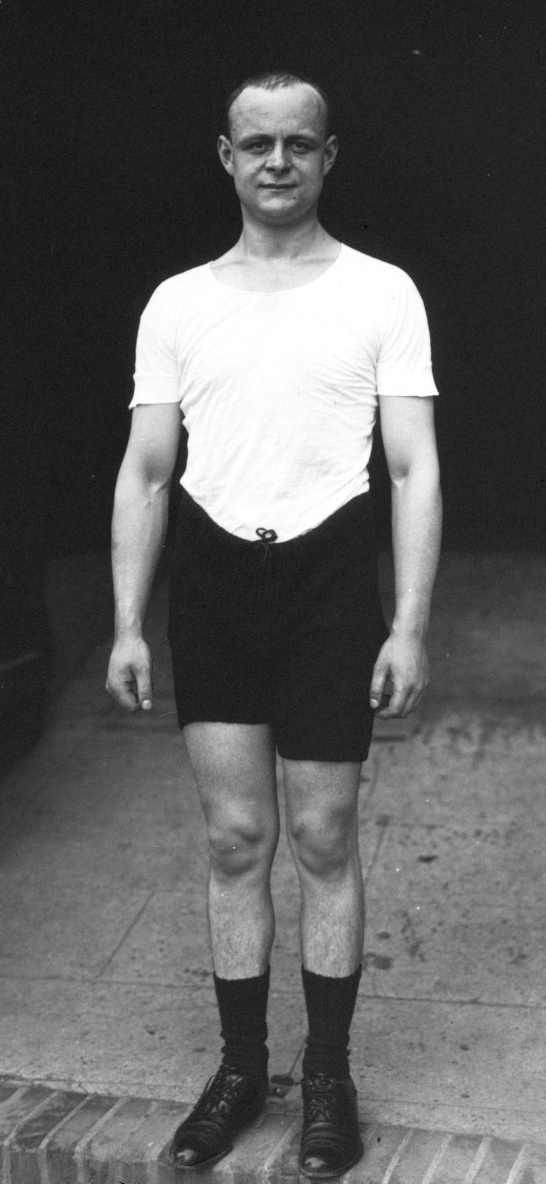
- Barrelet in 1911

Personal information
- Full name: Hermann Joseph Barrelet de Ricou
- Born: Hermann Joseph Barrelet; 25 September 1879 Neuchâtel, Switzerland
- Died: 24 September 1964 (aged 84)

Sport
- Sport: Rowing
- Club: SN d'Enghien, Enghien-les-Bains
Medal record
Representing France
Olympic Games
Gold medal – first place	1900 Paris	Single sculls
European Rowing Championships
Gold medal – first place	1901 Zürich	Single sculls
Gold medal – first place	1909 Paris	Eight
Gold medal – first place	1913 Ghent	Double sculls

Hermann Joseph Barrelet de Ricou (25 September 1879 – 24 September 1964) was a Swiss-born French rower. He won gold medals in single sculls at the 1900 Summer Olympics and 1901 European Championships. Barrelet continued to compete in single sculls into his thirties, but had better achievements in team events, winning European titles in the men's eight (1909) and double sculls (1913, with Anatol Peresselenzeff).
