= Louis Prével =

French rower (1879–1964)

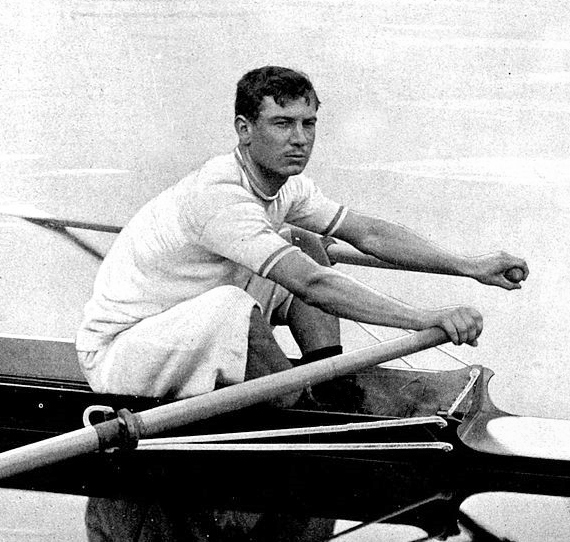
- Louis Prével in 1900

Personal information
- Full name: Louis Xavier François Prével
- Born: 29 January 1879 Nice, France
- Died: 26 November 1964 (aged 85) Nice, France

Sport
- Sport: Rowing
- Club: CNN, Nice
Medal record
Representing France
European Rowing Championships
Gold medal – first place	1899 Ostend	Single sculls
Gold medal – first place	1900 Paris	Single sculls

Louis Xavier François Prével (29 January 1879 – 26 November 1964) was a French single scull rower who competed at the 1900 Summer Olympics. A French and European champion, he won his semifinal, but failed to finish the final. He claimed that another rower knocked him out of his scull.
