= 1899 European Rowing Championships =

- Venue: Bruges–Ostend Canal
- Location: Ostend, Belgium
- Dates: mid-August

The 1899 European Rowing Championships were rowing championships held on the Bruges–Ostend Canal in the Belgian city of Ostend on a day in mid-August. (Note: The FISA Congress was held on 14 August and this was always an event a day prior or after the championships.) The competition was for men only and they competed in five boat classes (M1x, M2x, M2+, M4+, M8+).

== Medal summary ==
Event	Gold		Silver		Bronze	
Event	Country & rowers	Time	Country & rowers	Time	Country & rowers	Time
M1x	France; Louis Prével		Belgium; Joseph Deleplanque		(Note: The source does not specify whether there were only two teams or whether the bronze medal winner is missing from the results list.)	
M2x	Belgium; Prosper Bruggeman; Charles Boone		Italy; Fiorenzo Pagliano; Luigi Rossi		France (Note: The source does not list the names of the team members.)	
M2+	France; Carlos Deltour; Antoine Védrenne		Belgium; Joseph Deleplanque; Florent Ronsse; Jean Dewitte (cox)		Italy; Gino Montelatici; Giovanni Pianigiani; G. Pucci (cox)	
M4+	Belgium; Adolphe Lippens; Maurice Hemelsoet; Henri Fraikin; Victor De Bisschop		Italy; Ezio Carlesi; Nicolo Razzaguta; Alfredo Taddei; Giovanni Rodinis; Pinolo (cox)		(Note: The source does not specify whether there were only two teams or whether the bronze medal winner is missing from the results list.)	
M8+	Belgium; Joseph Deleplanque; Florent Ronsse; Adolphe Lippens; Maurice Hemelsoet; Henri Fraikin; Victor De Bisschop; Prosper Bruggeman; Jules De Bisschop; Jean Dewitte (cox)		Italy; G. Alessandro Bonnet; Giacomo Leva; Paolo Gadda; Angelo Brambillasca; Luigi Gerli; Emilio Pozzi; Georges Claessens; Cesare Comelli; Colenghi (cox)		France (Note: The source does not list the names of the team members.)	
