= 1900 European Rowing Championships =

- Venue: Seine
- Location: Courbevoie, Paris, France
- Dates: ? September

Location of the regatta venue

The 1900 European Rowing Championships were rowing championships held in Paris on the Seine in early September. The 1900 regatta was held between the Courbevoie Bridge and the Asnières Bridge, the same venue that had been used for the 1900 Summer Olympics a week earlier. The length of the regatta course was 1,750 metres (5,740 ft). The competition was for men only and they competed in five boat classes (M1x, M2x, M2+, M4+, M8+).

== Medal summary ==
Event	Gold		Silver		Bronze	
Event	Country & rowers	Time	Country & rowers	Time	Country & rowers	Time
M1x	France; Louis Prével		Belgium; Edmond Delaet		Italy; Luigi Gerli	
M2x	France; Carlos Deltour; Antoine Védrenne		Belgium; Prosper Bruggeman; Charles Boone		Alsace-Lorraine (Note: The source does not list the names of the team members.)	
M2+	France; Lucien Martinet; René Waleff		Belgium; Marcel Van Crombrugge; Oscar Dessomville; Alfred Van Landeghem (cox)		Italy; Paolo Diana; Giuseppe Nacci; Clementino Sbisà (cox)	
M4+	Belgium; Marcel Van Crombrugge; Maurice Hemelsoet; Prosper Bruggeman; Oscar Dessomville; Alfred Van Landeghem (cox)		Italy; Paolo Diana; Giuseppe Nacci; Gaetano Caccavallo; Vittorio Narducci; Clementino Sbisà (cox)		(Note: The source does not specify whether there were only two teams or whether the bronze medal winner is missing from the results list.)	
M8+	Belgium; Marcel Van Crombrugge; Maurice Hemelsoet; Oscar De Cock; Maurice Verdonck; Prosper Bruggeman; Oscar Dessomville; Frank Odberg; Jules De Bisschop; Alfred Van Landeghem (cox)		France (Note: The source does not list the names of the team members.)		(Note: The source does not specify whether there were only two teams or whether the bronze medal winner is missing from the results list.)	
