= 1901 European Rowing Championships =

- Venue: Lake Zurich
- Location: Zurich, Switzerland
- Dates: mid-August

The 1901 European Rowing Championships were rowing championships held on Lake Zurich in the Swiss city of Zürich on a day in mid-August. (Note: The FISA Congress was held on 17 August and this was always an event a day prior or after the championships.) The competition was for men only and they competed in five boat classes (M1x, M2x, M2+, M4+, M8+).

== Medal summary ==
| Event | Gold | | Silver | | Bronze | |
|---|---|---|---|---|---|---|
| Event | Country & rowers | Time | Country & rowers | Time | Country & rowers | Time |
| M1x | France; Hermann Barrelet | | Belgium; Edmond Delaet | | Italy; Luigi Gerli | |
| M2x | France; Robert d'Heilly; O. Bouttemy | | Belgium; Daniël Clarembaux; Henri van Mol | | Switzerland; Georges Rieder; Charles Nicollier | |
| M2+ | France; Delabarre; R. Gelée | | Alsace-Lorraine (Note: The source does not list the names of the team members.) | | Italy; Paolo Diana; Vittorio Narducci; Clementino Sbisà (cox) | |
| M4+ | Italy; Paolo Diana; Giuseppe Nacci; Gaetano Caccavallo; Vittorio Narducci; Clementino Sbisà (cox) | | Belgium; Theodore Conrades; Maurice Vandenberghe; Robert Vandenkerkhoeve; Xavier Crombet | | Alsace-Lorraine; Louis Sigel; Charles Muhlberger; Charles Engel; Gustav Kettner; A. Knoch (cox) | |
| M8+ | Belgium; Marcel Van Crombrugge; Maurice Hemelsoet; Oscar De Cock; Polydore Veirman; Charles Boone; Oscar Dessomville; Georges Demeester; Gaston Goetgeluck; Alfred Van Landeghem (cox) | | France (Note: The source does not list the names of the team members.) | | Italy; Cino Ceni; Italo Ponis; Renato Orlandini; Fabio Orlandini; Gino Montelatici; Gastone Orlandini; Giorgio Bensa; Cesare Galardelli | |
