= 1898 European Rowing Championships =

- Venue: Po
- Location: Turin, Italy
- Dates: mid-August

The 1898 European Rowing Championships were rowing championships held on the river Po in the Italian city of Turin on a day in mid-August. (Note: The FISA Congress was held on 17 August and this was always an event a day prior or after the championships.) The competition was for men only and they competed in five boat classes (M1x, M2x, M2+, M4+, M8+); it was the first year that the double scull event formed part of the competition.

== Medal summary ==
Event	Gold		Silver		Bronze	
Event	Country & rowers	Time	Country & rowers	Time	Country & rowers	Time
M1x	Belgium; Joseph Deleplanque		Italy; Pietro Umberto		Switzerland; Charles Nicollier	
M2x	France; Dorlia; Lucien Martinet		Italy; Fiorenzo Pagliano; Giacomo Parvopasso		Switzerland; Georges Rieder; Charles Nicollier	
M2+	France; Émile Lejeune; Maurice Carton; Louis Carré (cox)		Belgium; Joseph Deleplanque; Florent Ronsse; Jean Dewitte (cox)		Italy; Alberto Grazzini; Enrico Bertolini; Sali (cox)	
M4+	Belgium; Adolphe Lippens; Maurice Hemelsoet; Henri Fraikin; Victor De Bisschop		France; Albert Williot; Charles Fourquart; Maurice Pechell; Maurice Gest; Catala (cox)		Italy; Cino Ceni; Italo Ponis; Giorgio Bensa; Cesare Galardelli; G. Pucci (cox)	
M8+	Belgium; Joseph Deleplanque; Florent Ronsse; Prosper Bruggeman; Gustave Brandes; Henri Fraikin; Victor De Bisschop; Frank Odberg; Jules De Bisschop; Jean Dewitte (cox)		Italy; Cino Ceni; Italo Ponis; Giuseppe Belli; Gino Montelatici; Azzolino Pollini; Biondo Biondi; Giorgio Bensa; Cesare Galardelli; G. Pucci (cox)		(Note: The source does not specify whether there were only two teams or whether the bronze medal winner is missing from the results list.)	
