= Bruges–Ostend Canal =

Canal in Belgium

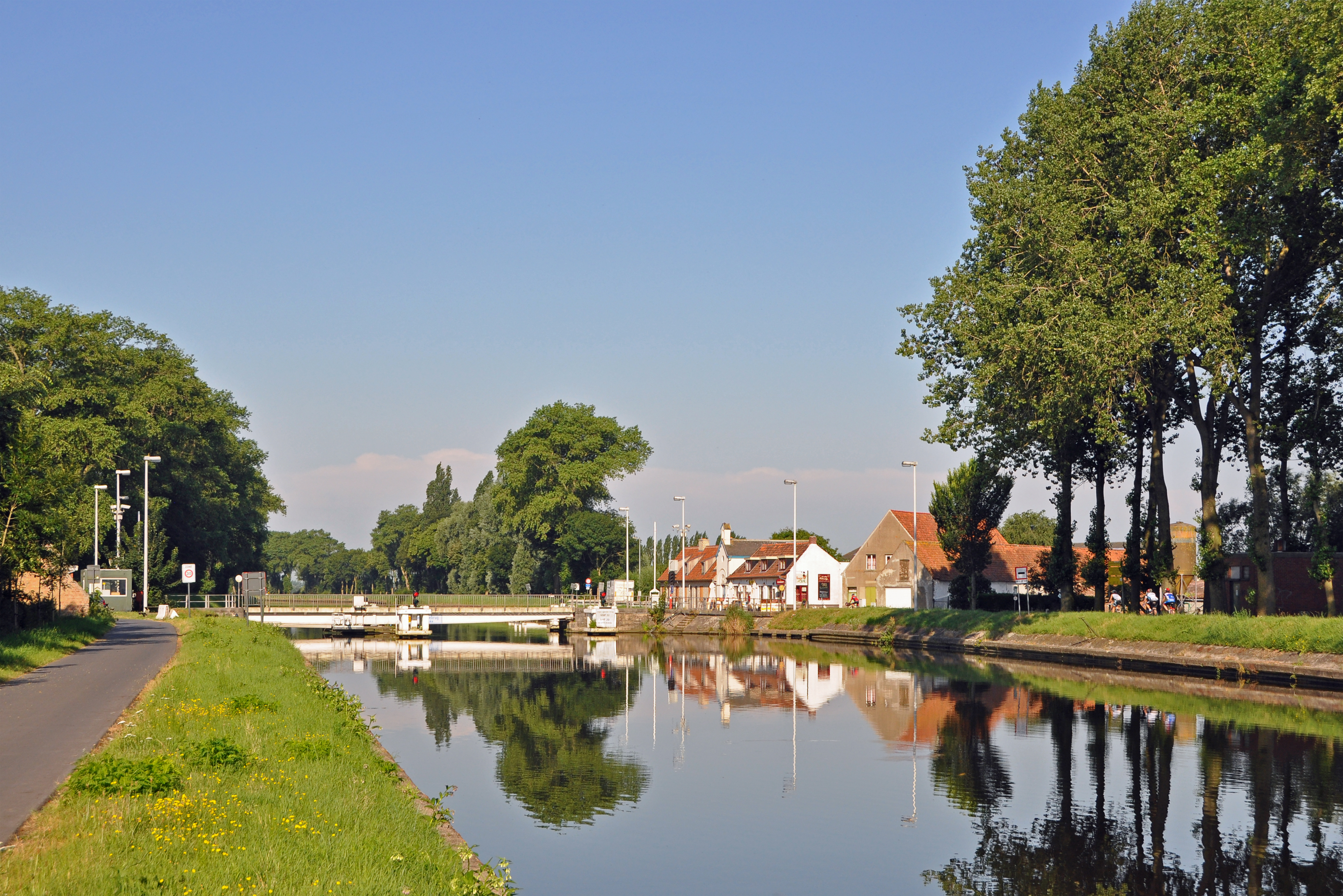
- Nieuwege Bridge over the Bruges-Ostend Canal in Varsenare
- Interactive map of Bruges–Ostend Canal

Specifications
- Length: 24.6 km (15.3 mi)

History
- Current owner: Flemish Government
- Date of first use: 1618
- Date completed: 1623

Geography
- Start point: Ostend
- End point: Bruges
- Beginning coordinates: 51.1317°N 3.1403°E

The Bruges–Ostend Canal (Dutch: Kanaal Brugges-Oostende) is a 24.6 km (15.3 mi) long canal in Flanders, Belgium. The canal connects the North Sea to the Belgian interior, running between the cities of Ostend and Bruges. In Bruges, it is connected to three other canals: the Canal Ghent–Bruges, Damme Canal, and Boudewijn Canal which leads to the Port of Zeebrugge. Construction started in 1618, it was finished in 1623.

The 1899 European Rowing Championships were held on the canal in Ostende.
