= European Rowing Championships =

International rowing event

- Status: active
- Genre: sports event
- Date: midyear
- Frequency: annual
- Inaugurated: 1893
- Most recent: 2026
- Organiser: World Rowing

The European Rowing Championships is an international rowing regatta organised by World Rowing (named FISA until 2020) for European rowing nations, plus Israel, which, though not a member of the European federation, is treated as a European nation for competition purposes.

The championships date back to 1893, the year after FISA (the International Rowing Federation) was founded. Over time, the competition grew in status and as it was not restricted to European countries, became regarded as the quasi-world championships. The World Rowing Championships were commenced in 1962 and the last European Championships were held in 1973 as from 1974, the World Championships became an annual event. The European Championships were re-introduced in 2007 but with a narrower focus on Europe.

== History ==
The first regatta held as a European Rowing Championships was held in 1893 and these continued annually until 1913; the 1914 to 1919 events did not occur due to World War I. The annual schedule was next interrupted in 1928 when the Amsterdam Olympics were regarded as a replacement event; the 1920 Antwerp Olympics or the 1924 Paris Olympics had previously not been a reason for skipping the European Championships. The next time the Olympics were held in Europe, i.e. the 1936 Berlin Olympics, again saw the European Championships skipped. World War II saw the 1939 to 1946 regattas cancelled. The next European event was held in 1947, with subsequent years skipped due to Europe-based Olympics in 1948 (London) and 1952 (Helsinki).

The 1951 European Rowing Championships is notable as the first test event for international women's rowing organised by the International Rowing Federation (FISA). Regattas continued under that name until 1973. From 1962, the event was replaced (one year in four) by the World Rowing Championships, which then became an annual event from 1974. Women's events were introduced in 1954, the first international races for women, but even then men's and women's events were held on different days, and in some years at different venues.

On 27 May 2006 the FISA members voted to re-introduce a separate European Rowing Championships in its own right.

In the first regatta there were only three events (men's single, coxed four and eight) and only ten entries. Races were 3,000 m long, except for singles – which were only 2,000 m. Coxed pair was first raced in the following year and double scull was added in 1898. Coxless pair was added in 1924 and coxless four was added the year after. The next change after that was the inclusion of women's rowing.

In 2007, when the European Rowing Championship was re-introduced, there were 14 Olympic boat classes racing over 2,000m. Historically the leading European nations, notably Great Britain and Germany, had taken a haphazard approach to attending the championships. Following the 2012 Summer Olympics, however, both fully committed to the event going forward, and from that date, the championships have progressed rapidly to represent one of the key events in world rowing; given the historic and modern strength of European rowing, they rank behind only the Olympic Games, World Championships and World Cup Series. In Olympic years, when World Championships are not held, they provide a key test ahead of the Olympic regatta, in addition to a significant competitive opportunity in their own right.

In 2015, European Rowing announced that the 2018 edition of the championships would form part of the first European Championships, a co-branded multi-sport event organised by, and consisting of the European championships of, the individual European sports federations.

== Editions ==
The first regatta held as a European Rowing Championships was held in 1893. (Note: 2018 Edition Part of the European Championships)

With rowing officials from around the world coming to the regatta, the International Rowing Federation (FISA) held an ordinary congress on 30 August 1950 in Milan. It was at that congress that it was decided that women's rowing would be trialled. The first test event over the shorter agreed 1,000 m distance was run at the 1951 European Rowing Championships in Mâcon a day prior to the men's competition starting. The 1954 European Rowing Championships were rowing championships held on the Bosbaan regatta course in the Dutch city of Amsterdam. This edition is particularly notable for the fact that it was the first time that women were allowed to compete as part of the championships, after three years of trial regattas for them. Women from 13 countries were represented with 34 boats, and they competed in five boat classes (W1x, W2x, W4x+, W4+, W8+) from 20 to 22 August.

#	Year	Host city	Host Country	Events
Men events only
1	1893	Lake Orta	Italy	3
2	1894	Mâcon	France	4
3	1895	Ostend	Belgium	4
4	1896	Geneva	Switzerland	4
5	1897	Pallanza	Italy	4
6	1898	Turin	Italy	5
7	1899	Ostend	Belgium	5
8	1900	Paris	France	5
9	1901	Zürich	Switzerland	5
10	1902	Strasbourg/Kehl	Germany	5
11	1903	Venice	Italy	5
12	1904	Paris	France	5
13	1905	Ghent	Belgium	5
14	1906	Pallanza	Italy	5
15	1907	Strasbourg/Kehl	Germany	5
16	1908	Lucerne	Switzerland	5
17	1909	Paris	France	5
18	1910	Ostend	Belgium	5
19	1911	Como	Italy	5
20	1912	Geneva	Switzerland	5
21	1913	Ghent	Belgium	5
1914–1919: not held due to World War I
22	1920	Mâcon	France	5
23	1921	Amsterdam	Netherlands	5
24	1922	Barcelona	Spain	5
25	1923	Como	Italy	5
26	1924	Zürich	Switzerland	6
27	1925	Prague	Czechoslovakia	7
28	1926	Lucerne	Switzerland	7
29	1927	Como	Italy	7
30	1929	Bydgoszcz	Poland	7
31	1930	Liège	Belgium	7
32	1931	Paris	France	7
33	1932	Belgrade	Yugoslavia	7
34	1933	Budapest	Hungary	7
35	1934	Lucerne	Switzerland	7
36	1935	Berlin	Germany	7
37	1937	Amsterdam	Netherlands	7
38	1938	Milan	Italy	7
1939–1946: not held due to World War II
39	1947	Lucerne	Switzerland	7
40	1949	Amsterdam	Netherlands	7
41	1950	Milan	Italy	7
42	1951	Mâcon	France	7
43	1953	Copenhagen	Denmark	7
Women events added
44	1954	Amsterdam	Netherlands	12
45	1955	Bucharest (Women)	Romania	5
45	1955	Ghent (Men)	Belgium	7
46	1956	Bled	Yugoslavia	12
47	1957	Duisburg	West Germany	12
48	1958	Poznań	Poland	12
49	1959	Mâcon	France	12
50	1960	London	United Kingdom	5
51	1961	Prague	Czechoslovakia	12
52	1962	East Berlin	East Germany	5
53	1963	Copenhagen (Men)	Denmark	7
53	1963	Moscow (Women)	Soviet Union	5
54	1964	Amsterdam	Netherlands	12
55	1965	Duisburg	West Germany	12
56	1966	Amsterdam	Netherlands	5
57	1967	Vichy	France	12
58	1968	East Berlin	East Germany	5
59	1969	Klagenfurt	Austria	12
60	1970	Tata	Hungary	5
61	1971	Copenhagen	Denmark	12
62	1972	Brandenburg an der Havel	East Germany	5
63	1973	Moscow	Soviet Union	12
1974–2006: not held due to the World Rowing Championships
64	2007	Poznań	Poland	14
65	2008	Marathon	Greece	14
66	2009	Brest	Belarus	14
67	2010	Montemor-o-Velho	Portugal	22
68	2011	Plovdiv	Bulgaria	14
69	2012	Varese	Italy	14
70	2013	Seville	Spain	17
71	2014	Belgrade	Serbia	17
72	2015	Poznań	Poland	17
73	2016	Brandenburg an der Havel	Germany	17
74	2017	Račice	Czech Republic	18
75	2018	Glasgow	United Kingdom	17
76	2019	Lucerne	Switzerland	17
Para events was added
77	2020	Poznań	Poland	22
78	2021	Varese	Italy	22
79	2022	Oberschleißheim	Germany	23
80	2023	Bled	Slovenia	21
81	2024	Szeged	Hungary	21
82	2025	Plovdiv	Bulgaria	20
83	2026	Varese	Italy	

== All-time medal table ==
Total of medals from 1893 to 2025. Alsace-Lorraine won one gold, three silvers and nine bronzes which are added to Germany's total medals.

Rank	Nation	Gold	Silver	Bronze	Total
1	Italy	96	116	81	293
2	Soviet Union	94	39	24	157
3	Switzerland	60	42	50	152
4	Romania	51	50	48	149
5	France	49	82	86	217
6	Germany	46	48	34	128
7	Great Britain	46	33	29	108
8	Belgium	45	38	38	121
9	Netherlands	35	59	61	155
10	East Germany	30	39	18	87
11	West Germany	26	16	19	61
12	Hungary	23	18	30	71
13	Greece	21	18	4	43
14	Poland	16	34	36	86
15	Denmark	15	25	15	55
16	Ukraine	15	10	21	46
17	Czech Republic	13	10	14	37
18	Belarus	10	7	9	26
19	Croatia	9	6	6	21
20	Lithuania	8	11	7	26
21	Norway	8	5	10	23
22	Czechoslovakia	7	21	36	64
23	Russia	7	9	11	27
24	Austria	6	18	10	34
25	Ireland	6	6	6	18
26	Serbia	4	7	12	23
27	Estonia	4	3	3	10
28	Sweden	2	4	3	9
29	Finland	2	3	2	7
30	Yugoslavia	2	1	8	11
–	Individual Neutral Athletes	2	0	2	4
31	Spain	1	4	11	16
32	Portugal	1	3	3	7
33	Slovakia	1	2	1	4
34	Bulgaria	1	1	5	7
35	Israel	0	2	1	3
36	Turkey	0	2	0	2
37	Azerbaijan	0	1	0	1
37	Georgia	0	1	0	1
37	Latvia	0	1	0	1
40	Slovenia	0	0	3	3
41	Moldova	0	0	2	2
Totals (41 entries)		762	795	759	2,316

== See also ==
- European Rowing U23 Championships
- European Rowing U19 Championships
