= Great Britain at the 1900 Summer Olympics =

- Flag of the United Kingdom
- IOC code: GBR
- NOC: British Olympic Association

in Paris
- Competitors: 101 in 14 sports
- Medals Ranked 3rd: Gold 20 Silver 8 Bronze 9 Total 37

Summer Olympics appearances (overview)
- 1896; 1900; 1904; 1908; 1912; 1920; 1924; 1928; 1932; 1936; 1948; 1952; 1956; 1960; 1964; 1968; 1972; 1976; 1980; 1984; 1988; 1992; 1996; 2000; 2004; 2008; 2012; 2016; 2020; 2024

Other related appearances
- 1906 Intercalated Games

The United Kingdom of Great Britain and Ireland competed as Great Britain at the 1900 Summer Olympics in Paris, France. It was the second appearance of Britain after having participated in the inaugural 1896 Games. In Olympic competition, the nation has always shortened its official name to Great Britain rather than the United Kingdom seen elsewhere.

== Medallists ==
Medal	Name	Sport	Event	Date
1st place, gold medalist(s)	Lorne Currie; John Gretton; Linton Hope; Algernon Maudslay	Sailing	Open class	May 20
1st place, gold medalist(s)	Lorne Currie; John Gretton; Linton Hope; Algernon Maudslay	Sailing	.5 to 1 ton	May 25
1st place, gold medalist(s)	Howard Taylor; Edward Hore; Harry Jefferson	Sailing	3 to 10 ton	May 25
1st place, gold medalist(s)	Cecil Quentin	Sailing	20+ ton	August 2
1st place, gold medalist(s)	Foxhunters Hurlingham: Denis St. George Daly; Alfred Rawlinson; John Beresford; Foxhall Parker Keene (USA); Frank Mackey (USA)	Polo	Men's Polo	June 2
1st place, gold medalist(s)	Charlotte Cooper	Tennis	Women's singles	July 11
1st place, gold medalist(s)	Laurence Doherty	Tennis	Men's singles	July 11
1st place, gold medalist(s)	Laurence Doherty; Reginald Doherty	Tennis	Men's doubles	July 11
1st place, gold medalist(s)	Reginald Doherty; Charlotte Cooper	Tennis	Mixed doubles	August 28
1st place, gold medalist(s)	Charles Bennett	Athletics	Men's 1500 m	July 15
1st place, gold medalist(s)	John Rimmer	Athletics	Men's 4000 m steeplechase	July 16
1st place, gold medalist(s)	Alfred Tysoe	Athletics	Men's 800 m	July 16
1st place, gold medalist(s)	Amateur Athletic Association of England (Note: At the 1900 Summer Olympics four team event medals (3 gold and 1 silver) won by British clubs competing as mixed teams—composed primarily of British athletes alongside a few non-British participants—were attributed to Great Britain: gold in the 5000 metres team race, polo, and water polo and silver in polo.): Charles Bennett; John Rimmer; Sidney Robinson; Alfred Tysoe; Stan Rowley (AUS)	Athletics	5000 metres team race	July 22
1st place, gold medalist(s)	Frederick Lane (AUS) (Note: Australian Frederick Lane competed at the 1900 Summer Olympics, winning two gold medals in the swimming events. As a representative of a British club, his participation and medals were attributed accordingly.)	Swimming	Men's 200 metre freestyle	August 12
1st place, gold medalist(s)	Frederick Lane (AUS)	Swimming	Men's 200 metre obstacle	August 12
1st place, gold medalist(s)	John Jarvis	Swimming	Men's 1000 m freestyle	August 12
1st place, gold medalist(s)	John Jarvis	Swimming	Men's 4000 m freestyle	August 19
1st place, gold medalist(s)	Osborne Swimming Club of Manchester: Thomas Coe; Robert Crawshaw; William Henry; John Arthur Jarvis; Peter Kemp; Frederick Stapleton; Victor Lindberg (NZL)	Water polo	Men's Water polo	August 12
1st place, gold medalist(s)	Devon and Somerset Wanderers Cricket Team: C. B. K. Beachcroft; Arthur Birkett; Alfred Bowerman; George Buckley; Francis Burchell; Frederick Christian; Harry Corner; Frederick Cuming; William Donne; Alfred Powlesland; John Symes; Montagu Toller	Cricket	2-day, 12 men	August 20
1st place, gold medalist(s)	Upton Park F.C.: James Jones; Claude Buckenham; William Gosling; Alfred Chalk; T. E. Burridge; William Quash; Richard Turner; F. G. Spackman; John Nicholas; Jack Zealley; Henry Haslam	Football	Men's Football	September 20
2nd place, silver medalist(s)	BLO Polo Club Rugby: Frederick Freake; Walter Buckmaster; Walter McCreery (USA); Jean de Madre (FRA)	Polo	Men's Polo	June 2
2nd place, silver medalist(s)	Harold Mahony	Tennis	Men's singles	July 11
2nd place, silver medalist(s)	Sidney Robinson	Athletics	Men's 2500 m steeplechase	July 15
2nd place, silver medalist(s)	Patrick Leahy	Athletics	Men's high jump	July 15
2nd place, silver medalist(s)	Charles Bennett	Athletics	Men's 4000 m steeplechase	July 16
2nd place, silver medalist(s)	Selwin Calverley	Sailing	20+ ton	August 2
2nd place, silver medalist(s)	Walter Rutherford	Golf	Men's individual	October 2
2nd place, silver medalist(s)	Moseley Wanderers: F. C. Bayliss; J. Henry Birtles; James Cantion; Arthur Darby; Clement Deykin; Leslie Hood; M. L. Logan; Herbert Loveitt; Herbert Nicol; V. Smith; M. W. Talbot; Joseph Wallis; Claude Whittindale; Raymond Whittindale; Francis Wilson	Rugby Union	Rugby Union	October 28
3rd place, bronze medalist(s)	Reginald Doherty	Tennis	Men's singles	July 11
3rd place, bronze medalist(s)	Arthur Norris	Tennis	Men's singles	July 11
3rd place, bronze medalist(s)	Harold Mahony; Arthur Norris	Tennis	Men's doubles	July 11
3rd place, bronze medalist(s)	Patrick Leahy	Athletics	Men's long jump	July 15
3rd place, bronze medalist(s)	Sidney Robinson	Athletics	Men's 4000 m steeplechase	July 16
3rd place, bronze medalist(s)	Edward Hore	Sailing	10 to 20 ton	August 6
3rd place, bronze medalist(s)	Peter Kemp	Swimming	Men's 200 m obstacle	August 12
3rd place, bronze medalist(s)	Saint-George Ashe	Rowing	Men's single sculls	August 26
3rd place, bronze medalist(s)	David Robertson	Golf	Men's individual	October 2

Reallocated medal

British Lloyd Hildebrand won a silver medal in the 25 km cycling event. As a representative of a French club, his participation and medal were attributed to France.

Medal	Name	Sport	Event	Date	Reallocated to
2nd place, silver medalist(s)	Lloyd Hildebrand	Cycling	Men's 25 kilometres	September 15	France

Medals by British athletes for non-British teams

Additionally, British competitors won two gold medals, two silver medals, and five bronze medals in team events while competing for a mixed team or non-British clubs. In accordance with the IOC's attribution for the 1896–1904 Olympics, these medals were credited to the country with which the respective team was affiliated.

Medal	Team	Sport	Event
1st place, gold medalist(s)	France	Sailing	2-3 ton (race 1)
1st place, gold medalist(s)	France	Sailing	2-3 ton (race 2)
2nd place, silver medalist(s)	France	Cricket	Men's Cricket
2nd place, silver medalist(s)	Mixed Team	Tennis	Mixed doubles
3rd place, bronze medalist(s)	Mixed Team	Tennis	Mixed doubles (first bronze pair)
3rd place, bronze medalist(s)	Mixed Team	Tennis	Mixed doubles (second bronze pair)
3rd place, bronze medalist(s)	Belgium	Football	Men's Football
3rd place, bronze medalist(s)	France	Polo	Men's Polo
3rd place, bronze medalist(s)	France	Water Polo	Men's Water Polo

== Results by event ==
=== Swimming ===
Great Britain made its Olympic swimming debut in 1900. Jarvis won gold medals in each of the two long distance freestyle events; as neither distance was used again, he is the only Olympic champion ever in both the 1000 metres and 4000 metres. Kemp added a bronze in the obstacle event, another one-time-only competition. This put Great Britain at the top of the leaderboard by gold-silver-bronze (Australia and Germany also had 2 gold medals, but neither won any other medals) though France (1 gold, 2 silvers, 2 bronzes) and Austria (3 silvers, 1 bronze) had more total medals.

Swimmer	Event	Semifinals		Final	
Swimmer	Event	Result	Rank	Result	Rank
Robert Crawshaw	Men's 200 metre freestyle	2:40.0	2 q	2:45.6	4
Peter Kemp	Men's 200 metre freestyle	2:51.0	2	did not advance	
F. Stapleton	Men's 200 metre freestyle	2:47.0	2 q	2:55.0	6
Bill Burgess	Men's 1000 metre freestyle	16:54.0	2 q	DNF	10
John Arthur Jarvis	Men's 1000 metre freestyle	14:28.6	1 Q	13:40.2	1st place, gold medalist(s)
Bill Burgess	Men's 4000 metre freestyle	1:15:04.8	2 q	1:15:07.6	4
William Henry	Men's 4000 metre freestyle	1:22:58.4	3 q	DNF	8
John Arthur Jarvis	Men's 4000 metre freestyle	1:01:48.4	1 Q	58:24.0	1st place, gold medalist(s)
E. T. Jones	Men's 4000 metre freestyle	DNF	–	did not advance	
Bill Burgess	Men's 200 metre backstroke	3:50.4	3 q	3:12.0	5
Robert Crawshaw	Men's 200 metre backstroke	3:15.0	2 q	DNF	9
William Henry	Men's 200 metre obstacle event	3:14.4	2 Q	2:58.0	6
Peter Kemp	Men's 200 metre obstacle event	3:12.0	1 Q	2:47.4	3rd place, bronze medalist(s)
F. Stapleton	Men's 200 metre obstacle event	3:18.4	3 q	2:55.0	5

=== Water polo ===
The British water polo team won gold easily. The roster listed is that credited with gold medals by the IOC, but not by Olympedia The roster for the Osborne Swimming Club of Manchester as listed by the International Olympic Committee is Thomas Coe, John Henry Derbyshire, Peter Kemp, William Lister, Arthur G. Robertson, Eric Robinson, and George Wilkinson. Lister, however, had died two weeks prior to the Games, while Derbyshire, Robinson, and Wilkinson all played water polo matches in England either during the tournament or too soon after it to have traveled back from Paris in time. A list of players contemporary to the match does not include Robertson, but does list Coe and Kemp in addition to Robert Crawshaw, William Henry, John Arthur Jarvis, Victor Lindberg, and Frederick Stapleton. Lindberg has been considered the first New Zealand Olympian, although he "was born in Fiji to Swedish and Irish parents, lived in New Zealand from a young age and, in Paris, represented a British club."

One British player (Thomas William Burgess) played on a French team that won a bronze medal, as well, but the IOC credits that appearance to France and not Great Britain or a mixed team.

Team	Event	Quarterfinals	Semifinals	Final	Rank
Team	Event	Opposition Result	Opposition Result	Opposition Result	Rank
Osborne Swimming Club: Thomas Coe; John Henry Derbyshire; Peter Kemp; William Lister; Arthur G. Robertson; Eric Robinson; George Wilkinson	Men's water polo	Tritons Lillois (FRA); W 12-0	Pupilles de Neptune de Lille #2 (FRA); W 10-1	Brussels Swimming and Water Polo Club Belgium (BEL); W 7-2	1st place, gold medalist(s)

=== Athletics ===
Great Britain took 4 gold medals in athletics, including one as part of a mixed team (with 4 British athletes and one Australian). This put them second on the leaderboard for that sport, behind the dominant United States as the two nations to win multiple gold medals in the sport. The British team won a total of 9 athletics medals including a sweep of the 4000 metre steeplechase event. 9 athletes competed in 10 events.

Track events

Athlete	Event	Heat		Semifinal		Final	
Athlete	Event	Result	Rank	Result	Rank	Result	Rank
Alfred Tysoe	800 m	1:59.4	2 Q	—N/a		2:01.2	1st place, gold medalist(s)
Charles Bennett	1500 m	—N/a				4:06.2	1st place, gold medalist(s)
John Rimmer	1500 m	—N/a				Unknown	Unknown
Sidney Robinson	2500 m steeplechase	—N/a				7:38.0	2nd place, silver medalist(s)
John Rimmer	4000 m steeplechase	—N/a				12:58.4	1st place, gold medalist(s)
Charles Bennett	4000 m steeplechase	—N/a				12:58.6	2nd place, silver medalist(s)
Sidney Robinson	4000 m steeplechase	—N/a				12:58.6	3rd place, bronze medalist(s)
Ernest Ion Pool	marathon	—N/a				did not finish	
Frederick Randall	marathon	—N/a				did not finish	
William Saward	marathon	—N/a				did not finish	
William Taylor	marathon	—N/a				did not finish	

Field events

Athlete	Event	Qualifying		Final	
Athlete	Event	Result	Rank	Result	Rank
Patrick Leahy	high jump	—N/a		1.78	2nd place, silver medalist(s)
Patrick Leahy	long jump	6.71	5 Q	6.95	3rd place, bronze medalist(s)
Patrick Leahy	triple jump	—N/a		Unknown	4
Launceston Elliot	discus throw	31.0	11	did not advance	

=== Cricket ===
Great Britain was represented by the Devon and Somerset Wanderers in cricket in 1900. The team won the only match, a 2-day 12-man contest, by 158 runs.

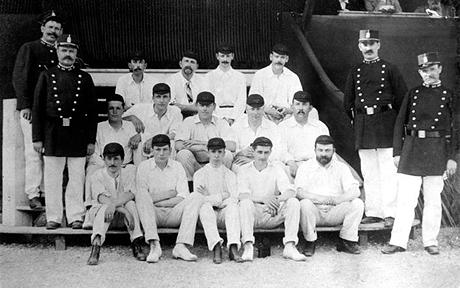
the british cricket team in 1900

Cricketers	Event	Final	Place
Cricketers	Event	Opposition Result	Place
Devon and Somerset Wanderers: C.B.K. Beachcroft (captain); Arthur Birkett; Alfred Bowerman; George Buckley; Francis Burchell; Frederick Christian; Harry Corner; Frederick Cuming; William Donne; Alfred Powlesland; John Symes; Montagu Toller	2-day 12-man	France; W by 158 runs	1st place, gold medalist(s)

=== Cycling ===
Athlete	Event	Place
Lloyd Hildebrand	Men's 25 kilometres	2nd place, silver medalist(s)

- Note - Recorded as Great Britain and Ireland until 2024, the IOC Executive Board approved the change of Lloyd Hildebrand's silver medal at Paris 1900 Olympics from Great Britain to France.

=== Fencing ===
Great Britain send fencers to the Olympics for the first time in 1900. None of the 3 British men reached the final in their event.

Fencer	Event	Round 1	Quarterfinal	Repechage	Semifinal	Final
Eugène Plisson	Men's masters foil	Not advanced by jury	did not advance			
Josiah Bowden	Men's épée	2 Q	Unknown	did not advance		
Charles Robinson	Men's épée	Unknown	did not advance			

=== Football ===
Upton Park F.C. represented Great Britain in the football competition. The club squad won its only match, against Club Française, 4-0.

Summary

Team	Event	Match 1	Match 2	Rank
Team	Event	Opposition Result	Opposition Result	Rank
Upton Park F.C.	Men's football	Club Française (FRA); W 4–0	Bye	1st place, gold medalist(s)

Match 1

20 September 1900

Club Français (France)	0–4	(United Kingdom) Upton Park FC
	Report	Nicholas (?); Turner 5'; Zealley 7'

Vélodrome de Vincennes, Paris
Attendance: 500
Referee: Maignard (France)

Team details

Club Français	Upton Park

GK	Lucien Huteau
RB	Louis Bach
LB	Pierre Allemane
RH	Virgile Gaillard
CH	Alfred Bloch
LH	Maurice Macaire
OR	Eugène Fraysse (capt.)
IR	René Garnier
CF	Marcel Lambert
IL	René Grandjean
OL	Fernand Canelle

GK	James Jones
RB	Claude Buckenham
LB	William Gosling
RH	Alfred Chalk
CH	T. E. Burridge
LH	William Quash
OR	Richard Turner
IR	F. G. Spackman
CF	John Nicholas
IL	Jack Zealley
OL	Henry Haslam (capt.)

=== Golf ===
Great Britain was one of four nations to compete in the first Olympic golf events. The British golfers took the silver and bronze medals in the men's competition, making Great Britain the only nation other than the United States to win a golfing medal that year.

Golfer	Event	Score	Rank
William Bathurst Dove	Men's individual	186	7
David Donaldson Robertson	Men's individual	175	3rd place, bronze medalist(s)
Walter Rutherford	Men's individual	168	2nd place, silver medalist(s)
George Thorne	Men's individual	185	6
John Daunt	Men's individual	184	5

=== Gymnastics Artistic ===
Great Britain's second Olympic gymnastics appearance was no more successful than the nation's first, resulting in no medals.

Gymnast	Event	Score	Rank
William Connor	250	31	
Henry Hiatt	172	124	
Pearce	238	54	
William Lloyd Phillips	222	73	

=== Polo ===
Great Britain was one of four nations to compete in the first Olympic polo event. British athletes played on three of the five teams, two of which included either American or French players, while the third included both American and French. The mixed British/American combination took the top place, the British/American/French team secured the silver medal, while the British/French team reached third place.

Team	Event	Quarterfinals	Semifinals	Final	Rank
Team	Event	Opposition Result	Opposition Result	Opposition Result	Rank
Foxhunters Hurlingham: John Beresford; Denis St. George Daly; Alfred Rawlinson; 2 American players	Men's polo	Compiègne (FRA); W 10–0	Bagatelle (ZZX); W 6–4	BLO Polo Club Rugby (ZZX); W 3–1	1st place, gold medalist(s)
BLO Polo Club Rugby: Walter Buckmaster; Frederick Freake; 1 American player; 1 French player	Men's polo	Bye	Mexico; W 8–0	Foxhunters (ZZX); L 3–1	2nd place, silver medalist(s)
Bagatelle Polo Club de Paris: Frederick Agnew Gill; 3 French players	Men's polo	Bye	Foxhunters (ZZX); L 6–4	Did not advance	3rd place, bronze medalist(s)

=== Rowing ===
Britain had a single rower present at the first Olympic rowing contests, winning the bronze medal in the single sculls event.

Rower	Event	First round		Semifinals		Final	
Rower	Event	Time	Rank	Time	Rank	Time	Rank
Saint-George Ashe	Men's single sculls	6:38.8	1 Q	8:37.2	3 q	8:15.6	3rd place, bronze medalist(s)

=== Rugby ===
Britain was one of three teams to compete in the first Olympic rugby games. Britain lost its only game, against France. The game against Germany was cancelled due to travel plans.

Summary

Team	Event	Match 1	Match 2	Rank
Team	Event	Opposition Result	Opposition Result	Rank
Moseley Wanderers	Bye	France national rugby union team (FRA); L 27–8	2nd place, silver medalist(s)	

Match 2

28 Oct

France	27–8	(United Kingdom) Great Britain
	Report

Vélodrome de Vincennes, Paris
Attendance: 6,000
Referee: M.T.B. Potter

Roster

- Frank Bayliss
- Henry Birtles
- James Cantion
- Arthur Darby
- Clement Deykin
- Leslie Hood
- M. L. Logan
- Herbert Loveitt
- Herbert Nicol
- V. Smith
- M. W. Talbot
- Joseph Wallis
- Claude Whittindale
- Raymond Whittindale
- Francis Wilson

=== Sailing ===
Great Britain was second to France in gold medals at the 1900 sailing events with 4, but took only 1 other medal, a bronze. France took 5 golds, 9 silvers, and 10 bronzes for a total of 24 medals to Britain's 6. However, even a perfect performance by the British athletes would have earned only a total of 8 medals—Great Britain failed to medal in only 2 of its attempts. The crew members listed are those listed by the IOC in their database. The Olympic historian Ian Buchanan in his book "British Olympians" (1991) states that "reports on many aspects of the 1900 regatta are inconclusive and the crew members of the British entry "Scotia" has never been positively settled. The records of the British Olympic Association give the crew as Lorne Currie, John Gretton and Linton Hope, but it has been established that Linton Hope was in England at the time of the races and his name only appears in the Olympic records as he was the designer of the "Scotia". Similarly the names of Currie and Gretton are probably only listed as the owners of the boat but as it is possible that they sailed their boat, they are listed as Olympic champions, although the participation of Lorne Currie, in particular, is in doubt. The one crew member whose participation has been established is Algernon Maudslay, whose name does not appear in any Olympic records, but from contemporary press reports it is clear that he was the helmsman of the "Scotia"".

Single race events

Sailors	Event	Time	Rank
Lorne Currie; John Gretton, 1st Baron Gretton; Linton Hope; Algernon Maudslay	½–1 ton class race 1	3:29:45	1st place, gold medalist(s)
Lorne Currie; John Gretton, 1st Baron Gretton; Linton Hope; Algernon Maudslay	½–1 ton class race 2	3:45:46	4
E. William Exshaw; Frédéric Blanchy (FRA); Jacques le Lavasseur (FRA)	2–3 ton class race 1	2:17:30	1st place, gold medalist(s)
E. William Exshaw; Frédéric Blanchy (FRA); Jacques le Lavasseur (FRA)	2–3 ton class race 2	4:17:34	1st place, gold medalist(s)
John Howard Taylor; H. MacHenry (USA)	3–10 ton class race 1	Unknown	7
Edward Hore; Harry Jefferson	3–10 ton class race 2	4:14:58	1st place, gold medalist(s)
John Howard Taylor; H. MacHenry (USA)	3–10 ton class race 2	4:38.49	3rd place, bronze medalist(s)
Cecil Quentin	20+ ton class	5:29:46	1st place, gold medalist(s)
Selwin Calverley	20+ ton class	5:30:06	2nd place, silver medalist(s)
Lorne Currie; John Gretton, 1st Baron Gretton; Linton Hope; Algernon Maudslay	Open class	5:56:17	1st place, gold medalist(s)
E. William Exshaw; Frédéric Blanchy (FRA); Jacques le Lavasseur (FRA)	Open class	DNF	–

Regatta events

Sailors	Event	Race 1		Race 2		Race 3		Overall	
Sailors	Event	Time	Rank (points)	Time	Rank (points)	Time	Rank (points)	Score	Rank
Edward Hore	10–20 ton class	4:20:18	3rd, 8 points	3:41:49	1st, 10 points	DNF	–, 5 points	23 points	3rd place, bronze medalist(s)
Salusbury Mellor	10–20 ton class	4:25:48	5th, 6 points	3:53:17	5th, 6 points	3:36:02	4th, 7 points	19 points	5

=== Shooting ===
Great Britain was represented by one shooter in its second appearance. Merlin, who had competed for Great Britain four years earlier, competed again. He tied for 7th in the trap shooting event.

Shooter	Event	Score	Rank
Sidney Merlin	Men's trap	12	7

=== Tennis ===
Great Britain competed in tennis for the second time in 1900, again with great success. The Doherty brothers, Reginald and Laurence, and Charlotte Cooper won all 4 gold medals. Harold Mahony took silver in the men's singles and was on a mixed-nationality team that earned silver in the mixed doubles. Great Britain also took both of the bronzes in the men's singles and one of the bronzes in the men's doubles, as well as having British players comprise half of each bronze-medal mixed doubles pair. Ultimately, each of the 6 British tennis players took at least 1 medal.

Reginald and Laurence Doherty refused to play each other prior to the final. Since they were seeded in such a way that they would face each other in the semifinals, Reginald withdrew, accepting a bronze medal while Lawrence went on to win gold.

Player	Event	Round of 16	Quarterfinals	Semifinals	Final	Rank
Player	Event	Opposition Result	Opposition Result	Opposition Result	Opposition Result	Rank
Laurence Doherty	Men's singles	Lebréton (FRA); W 6-2, 6-3	de Garmendia (USA); W 6-2, 8-6	R. Doherty (GBR); W walkover	Mahony (GBR); W 6-2, 6-4, 6-3	1st place, gold medalist(s)
Reginald Doherty	Men's singles	Durand (FRA); W 6-1, 6-3	Lecaron (FRA); W 6-2, 6-1	L. Doherty (GBR); L walkover	Did not advance	3rd place, bronze medalist(s)
Harold Mahony	Men's singles	Sands (USA); W 6-2, 6-3	Bye	Norris (GBR); W 8-6, 6-1	L. Doherty (GBR); L 6-2, 6-4, 6-3	2nd place, silver medalist(s)
Arthur Norris	Men's singles	Prévost (FRA); W 6-4, 6-4	Warden (GBR); W 6-4, 6-2	Mahony (GBR); L 8-6, 6-1	Did not advance	3rd place, bronze medalist(s)
Archibald Warden	Men's singles	Bye	Norris (GBR); L 6-4, 6-2	did not advance		5
Charlotte Cooper	Women's singles	—N/a	Fourrier (FRA); W 6-2, 6-0	Jones (USA); W 6-2, 7-5	Prévost (FRA); W 6-1, 6-4	1st place, gold medalist(s)
Laurence Doherty; Reginald Doherty	Men's doubles	—N/a	Lebréton/Lecaron (FRA); W 6-2, 6-3	Mahony/Norris (GBR); W 6-4, 6-1, 6-4	Decugis (FRA)/ de Garmendia (USA); W 6-1, 6-1, 6-0	1st place, gold medalist(s)
Harold Mahony; Arthur Norris	Men's doubles	—N/a	Durand/Fauchier-Magnan (FRA); W 6-8, 6-1, 6-8	L. Doherty/R. Doherty (GBR); L 6-4, 6-1, 6-4	Did not advance	3rd place, bronze medalist(s)
Archibald Warden; Charles Sands (USA)	Men's doubles	—N/a	Decugis (FRA)/ de Garmendia (USA); L 6-8, 6-3, 7-5	did not advance		5
Reginald Doherty; Charlotte Cooper	Mixed doubles	—N/a	Bye	Jones (USA)/ L. Doherty (GBR); W 6-2, 6-4	H. Prévost (FRA)/ Mahony (GBR); W 6-2, 6-4	1st place, gold medalist(s)
Harold Mahony; Hélène Prévost (FRA)	Mixed doubles	—N/a	Bye	Rosenbaumová (BOH)/ Warden (GBR); W 6-3, 6-0	Cooper/R. Doherty (GBR); L 6-2, 6-4	2nd place, silver medalist(s)
Laurence Doherty; Marion Jones (USA)	Mixed doubles	—N/a	G. Jones/Sands (USA); W 6-1, 7-5	Cooper/R. Doherty (GBR); L 6-2, 6-4	Did not advance	3rd place, bronze medalist(s)
Archibald Warden; Hedwiga Rosenbaumová (BOH)	Mixed doubles	—N/a	Gillou/Verdé-Delisle; W 6-3, 3-6, 6-2	H. Prévost (FRA)/ Mahony (GBR); L 6-3, 6-0	Did not advance	3rd place, bronze medalist(s)
