= 1900 Summer Olympics medal table =

1900 Summer Olympics medals
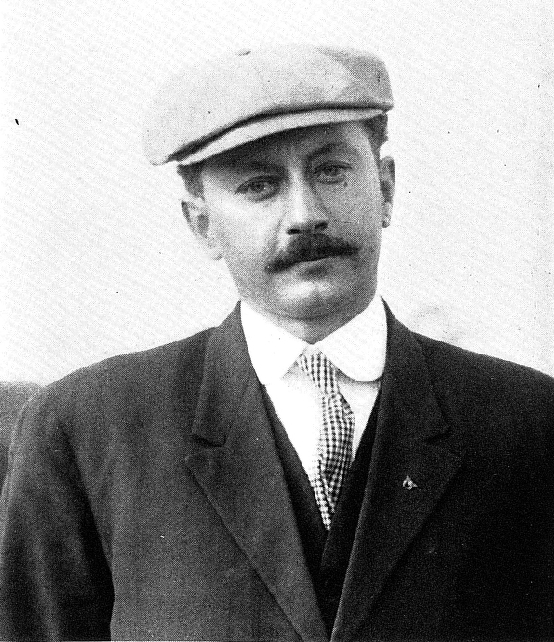
- American athlete Alvin Kraenzlein won four gold medals at the 1900 Summer Olympics, the most of any competing athlete.
- Location: Paris, France

Highlights
- Most gold medals: France (31)
- Most total medals: France (112)
- Medalling NOCs: 19

World map showing the medal achievements of each country during the 1900 Summer Olympics Legend: represents countries that won at least one gold medal. represents countries that won at least one silver medal but no gold medals. represents countries that won at least one bronze medal (no gold or silver). represents participating countries that did not win medals. represents entities that did not participate at the 1900 Summer Olympics.

The 1900 Summer Olympics, now officially known as the Games of the II Olympiad, were an international multi-sport event held in Paris, France, from May 14 to October 28, 1900, as part of the 1900 World's Fair. A total of 1,226 athletes representing 26 nations participated. The games featured 95 events in 19 sports. Archery, Basque pelota, cricket, croquet, equestrian jumping, football, golf, polo, rugby union, rowing, sailing, tug of war, and water Polo were contested for the first time at these Games. Women competed in the Olympics for the first time during the 1900 games. Athletes representing 19 nations received at least one medal. France won the most of every type of medal, while the United States won the second-most of every type of medal. Spain, Cuba, the Netherlands, Italy, and Belgium all won their nation's first Olympic gold medals. Belgium, Italy, Netherlands, Cuba, Spain, Norway, India, Bohemia, and Sweden all won their nation's first Olympic medals of any kind.

In the early Olympic Games, several team events were contested by athletes from multiple nations. During the 1900 games, athletes participating in mixed teams won medals in football, polo, rowing, tennis, and tug of war.

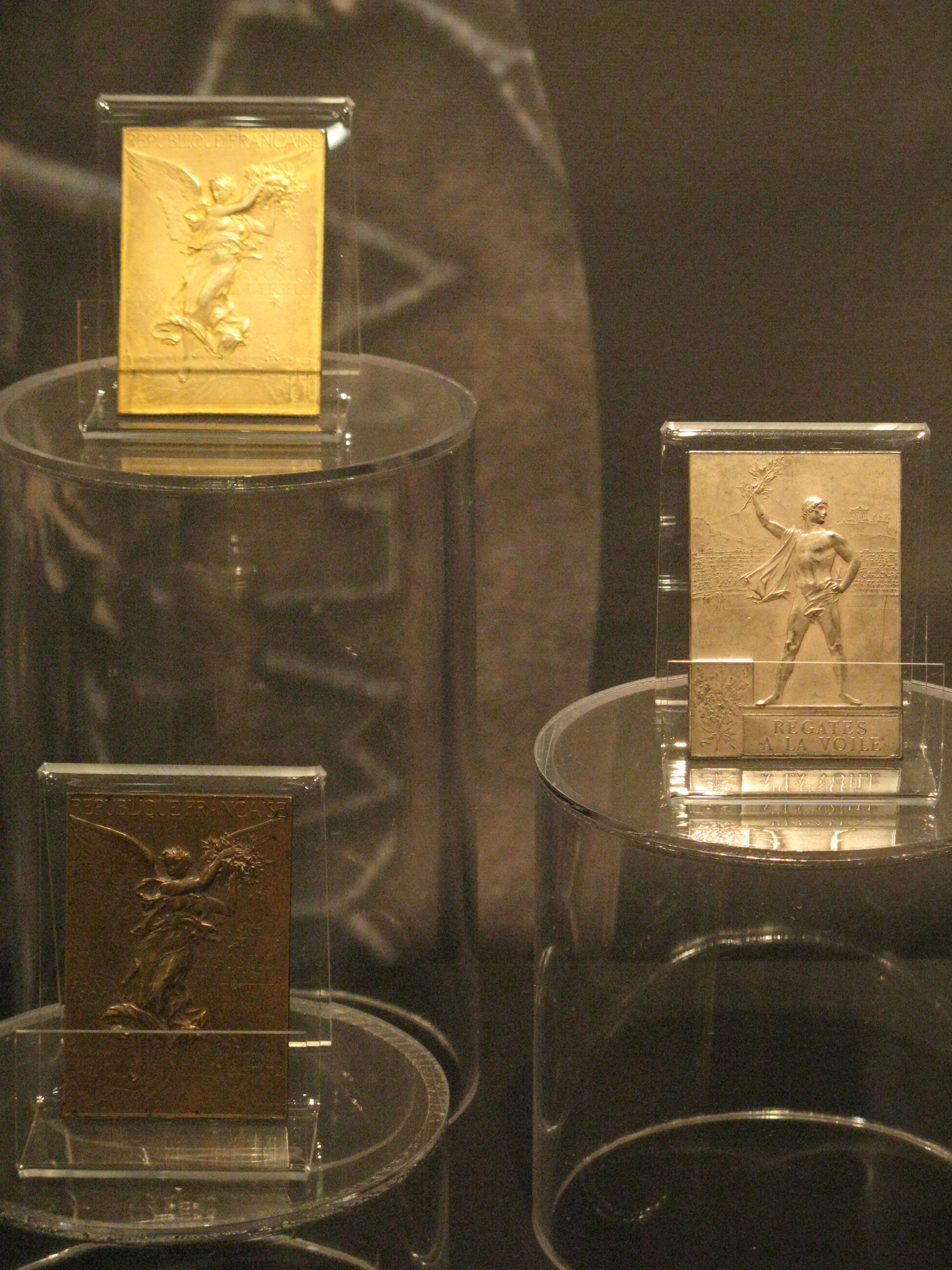
Gilt silver, silver, and bronze medals for the 1900 Olympic Games in the Olympic Museum collection

The 1900 Olympics is unique in being the only Olympic Games to feature rectangular medals, which were designed by Frédérique Vernon. Gilt silver medals were awarded for first place in shooting, lifesaving, motor racing, and gymnastics, while second place silver medals were awarded in shooting, rowing, sailing, tennis, gymnastics, fencing, equestrian, and athletics. Third place bronze medals were awarded in gymnastics, firefighting, and shooting. However, in many sports, medals were not awarded, with most of the listed prizes being cups and other similar trophies. The International Olympic Committee has retrospectively assigned gold, silver, and bronze medals to competitors who earned first, second, and third-place finishes in order to bring early Olympics in line with current awards. Alvin Kraenzlein won four gold medals at the 1900 Summer Olympics, the most of any competing athlete.

== Awards ==
Prizes worth a total of 953,448 francs were awarded to the athletes across the competitions. Various cash prizes and art objects were awarded to the athletes. In addition, medals and plaques were distributed, including the sports plaque designed by Frédéric de Vernon, available in gilt silver, silver, or bronze. Produced by Monnaie de Paris, the medal features two sides. On the front, a winged goddess holds laurel branches high above her head, with Paris and the grand monuments of the Universal Exhibition visible in the background. On the reverse, a victorious athlete stands proudly on a podium, raising a laurel branch in his right hand. Behind him, a stadium and the Acropolis of Athens serve as a reminder of the deep connection between ancient and modern Olympic traditions.

== Medal count ==
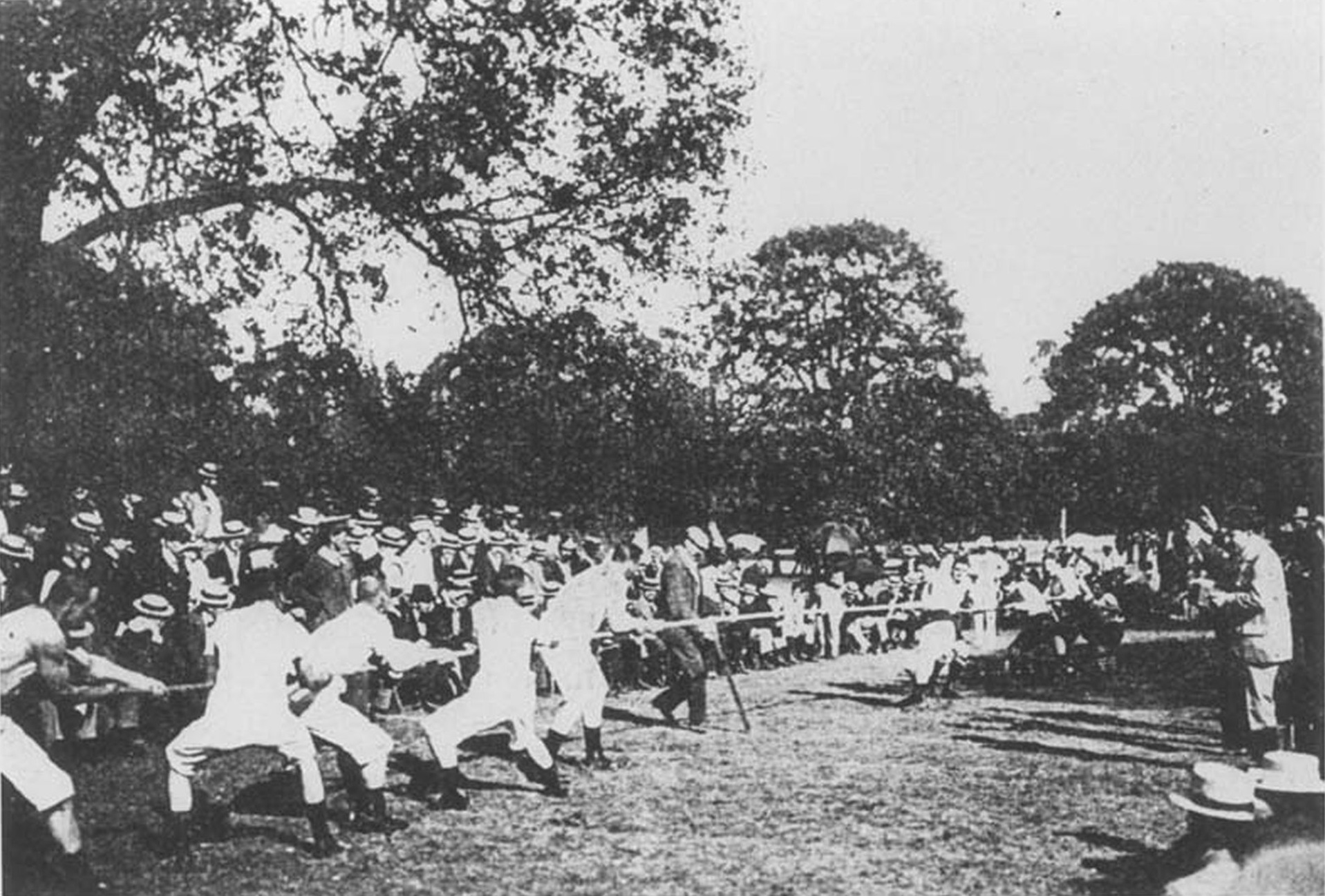
A mixed team made up of athletes from Sweden and Denmark beat the French team to win gold in the tug of war at the 1900 Summer Olympics.

The medal table is based on information provided by the International Olympic Committee (IOC) and is consistent with IOC conventional sorting in its published medal tables. The table uses the Olympic medal table sorting method. By default, the table is ordered by the number of gold medals the athletes from a nation have won. The number of silver medals is taken into consideration next and then the number of bronze medals. If teams are still tied, equal ranking is given and they are listed alphabetically by their IOC country code.

‡ Changes in medal standings (see below)

* Host nation (France)

1900 Summer Olympics medal table (Note: Figures in table reflect all official changes in medal standings.)
Rank	NOC	Gold	Silver	Bronze	Total
1	France*‡	31	41	40	112
2	United States	20	13	15	48
3	Great Britain‡	20	8	9	37
4	Belgium	6	6	6	18
5	Switzerland	6	3	1	10
6	Germany	4	3	2	9
7	Italy	3	2	0	5
8	Denmark	1	3	2	6
9	Mixed team	1	2	3	6
9	Netherlands	1	2	3	6
11	Hungary	1	2	2	5
12	Cuba	1	1	0	2
13	Spain	1	0	0	1
14	Austria	0	3	3	6
15	Norway	0	2	3	5
16	India	0	2	0	2
17	Bohemia	0	1	1	2
18	Australia	0	0	3	3
19	Sweden	0	0	1	1
Totals (19 entries)		96	94	94	284

== Changes in medal standings ==
=== Reallocation of Olympic medals to club affiliation ===
==== IOC attribution policy ====
From the 1896 to 1904 Olympic Games, athletes were not always entered by nationality. The concept of national teams selected by National Olympic Committees (NOCs) did not yet exist at these Games; most competitors participated as individuals or represented their sporting clubs, particularly in team events. In such cases, participation and medals could be attributed to the country of the club rather than the athlete's nationality. Consequently, the International Olympic Committee (IOC) has applied an inconsistent approach for attributing participation and medals from the 1896–1904 Olympic Games over time, alternating between the athlete's nationality and the national affiliation of the club they represented.

- Team events: Until 2024, the IOC classified all teams composed of athletes from different countries in the early Modern Olympic Games as mixed teams (IOC code ZZX), regardless of whether they represented an established club. Since 2024, teams representing a club have been attributed to the club's country, even if they included foreign athletes. Only ad hoc teams formed solely for the Olympic Games are now classified as mixed teams.
- Individual events: From 2021 to 2024, the IOC attributed medals in individual events according to the athlete's nationality, even when the athlete represented a foreign club. Since 2024, participation and medals have instead been attributed according to the national affiliation of the club represented by the athlete, largely restoring the attribution policy that had been applied for these Games prior to 2021.

A total of 21 medals from the 1900 Olympic Games, 8 in individual and 13 in team events, have been reallocated by the IOC since 2024.

Redistribution of medals in 2024
NOC	Gold	Silver	Bronze	Net Change
France	+4	+3	+3	+10
Great Britain	+5	0	0	+5
Netherlands	+1	0	0	+1
Switzerland	0	+1	0	+1
Belgium	0	0	+1	+1
United States	+1	−1	0	0
Luxembourg^{†}	−1	0	0	−1
Canada^{†}	−1	0	−1	−2
Australia	−2	0	0	−2
Mixed team	−7	−3	−3	−13

^{†}As a result of the reallocation, two countries — Canada and Luxembourg — are no longer represented in the official medal table of the 1900 Olympic Games.

==== Individual events ====
The below table list only the medalists whose medals were reclassified in 2024 by the IOC.

Denotes medal assigned by IOC to the athlete's registered NOC (club affiliation)

Medal	Sport/Event	Athlete (Nationality)	NOC affiliation of club	Pre-2024 reallocation	Post-2024 reallocation	Note
Gold	Athletics; Men's 2500 metres steeplechase	George Orton (CAN)	United States (USA); University of Pennsylvania	CAN	USA	(Note: George Orton was Canada's first Olympic medalist and champion, although this wasn't immediately recognized. As the concept of national teams selected by NOCs did not yet exist at the 1900 Olympic Games, athletes were generally identified by the clubs or institutions they represented. Orton competed for the University of Pennsylvania and was consequently initially assumed to be American, although he always considered himself a proud Canadian.)
Bronze	Athletics; Men's 400 metres hurdles	George Orton (CAN)	United States (USA); University of Pennsylvania	CAN	USA	(Note: George Orton was Canada's first Olympic medalist and champion, although this wasn't immediately recognized. As the concept of national teams selected by NOCs did not yet exist at the 1900 Olympic Games, athletes were generally identified by the clubs or institutions they represented. Orton competed for the University of Pennsylvania and was consequently initially assumed to be American, although he always considered himself a proud Canadian.)
Gold	Athletics; Marathon	Michel Théato (LUX)	France (FRA); Club Amical et Sportif de Saint-Mandé	LUX	FRA	(Note: Michel Théato represented a French club at the Olympics, so it had always been assumed that Théato was French. Athletics historian Alain Bouillé, however, discovered that he was born in Luxembourg.)
Gold	Swimming; Men's 200 metre freestyle	Frederick Lane (AUS)	Great Britain (GBR); Blackpool Swimming Club	AUS	GBR	(Note: Frederick Lane's nationality at the 1900 Paris Olympics is disputed. He was an Australian national although represented the Amateur Swimming Association of Great Britain and also swam for a British club, the Blackpool Swimming Club.)
Gold	Swimming; Men's 200 metre obstacle	Frederick Lane (AUS)	Great Britain (GBR); Blackpool Swimming Club	AUS	GBR	(Note: Frederick Lane's nationality at the 1900 Paris Olympics is disputed. He was an Australian national although represented the Amateur Swimming Association of Great Britain and also swam for a British club, the Blackpool Swimming Club.)
Silver	Cycling; Men's 25 kilometres	Lloyd Hildebrand (GBR)	France (FRA); Cercle des Sports de France	GBR	FRA	(Note: Lloyd Hildebrand's win in cycling was originally assigned to Great Britain, but in 2024 it was reassigned to France by the International Olympic Committee. The IOC stated that this happened because he "was born and brought up in France, and competed for a French club before and after Paris 1900".)
Silver	Golf; Women's individual	Pauline Whittier (USA)	Switzerland (SUI); St. Moritz Golf Club	USA	SUI	(Note: At the time of the 1900 Olympic golf event, Pauline Whittier was a US citizen but was living in Switzerland and playing her golf at the St. Moritz Golf Club. Abbie Pratt was also a US national in 1900 but she entered the Olympic golf tournament playing out of the Dinard Golf Club in France.)
Bronze	Golf; Women's individual	Abbie Pratt (USA)	France (FRA); Dinard Golf Club	USA	FRA	(Note: At the time of the 1900 Olympic golf event, Pauline Whittier was a US citizen but was living in Switzerland and playing her golf at the St. Moritz Golf Club. Abbie Pratt was also a US national in 1900 but she entered the Olympic golf tournament playing out of the Dinard Golf Club in France.)

==== Team events ====
The below table list only the teams, whose medals were reclassified in 2024 by the IOC.

Denotes medal assigned by IOC to the team's registered NOC (club affiliation)

Medal	Sport/Event	Team (Nationality)	NOC affiliation of club/team	Pre-2024 reallocation	Post-2024 reallocation	Note
Gold	Athletics; 5000 metres team race	Mixed team Charles Bennett (GBR); John Rimmer (GBR); Sidney Robinson (GBR); Stan Rowley (AUS); Alfred Tysoe (GBR)	Great Britain (GBR); Amateur Athletic Association of England	ZZX	GBR	(Note: The team race was essentially a club contest, with the Racing Club de France taking on a team from the Amateur Athletic Association (AAA) of Great Britain. Australian sprinter Stan Rowley competed for the AAA, allowing the association to field a team.)
Gold	Polo	Mixed team Denis St. George Daly (GBR); Foxhall Parker Keene (USA); Frank Mackey (USA); Alfred Rawlinson (GBR); John Beresford (GBR)	Great Britain (GBR); Foxhunters Hurlingham Polo Club	ZZX	GBR	(Note: At the 1900 Polo event, Foxhunters Hurlingham (GBR), BLO Polo Club Rugby (GBR), and Bagatelle Polo Club de Paris (FRA) won the medals in polo. All three podium teams were composed of players of mixed nationalities, reflecting the flexible team rules of the 1900 Games.)
Silver	Polo	Mixed team Walter McCreery (USA); Frederick Freake (GBR); Walter Buckmaster (GBR); Jean de Madre (FRA)	Great Britain (GBR); BLO Polo Club Rugby	ZZX	GBR	(Note: At the 1900 Polo event, Foxhunters Hurlingham (GBR), BLO Polo Club Rugby (GBR), and Bagatelle Polo Club de Paris (FRA) won the medals in polo. All three podium teams were composed of players of mixed nationalities, reflecting the flexible team rules of the 1900 Games.)
Bronze	Polo	Mixed team Frederick Agnew Gill (GBR); Robert Fournier-Sarlovèze (FRA); Edouard Alphonse de Rothschild (FRA); Maurice Raoul-Duval (FRA)	France (FRA); Polo Club de Paris	ZZX	FRA	(Note: At the 1900 Polo event, Foxhunters Hurlingham (GBR), BLO Polo Club Rugby (GBR), and Bagatelle Polo Club de Paris (FRA) won the medals in polo. All three podium teams were composed of players of mixed nationalities, reflecting the flexible team rules of the 1900 Games.)
Gold	Rowing; Coxed pair	Mixed team François Brandt (NED); Hermanus Brockmann (NED); Roelof Klein (NED); Unknown boy (FRA)	Netherlands (NED); Minerva Amsterdam	ZZX	NED	(Note: An "unknown French boy" is recorded to have participated as the coxswain for the gold-winning. mixed team (which was the Dutch team prior to his joining) in the men's coxed pair rowing competition. Believed to possibly be the youngest Olympic medalist in history, the identity of the boy remains to this day unknown. Despite being referred to as the "unknown French boy" in Olympic archives, his nationality is not known with certainty.)
Gold	Rugby	Mixed team Abel Albert (FRA); Jean Collas (FRA); Charles Gondouin (FRA); Wladimir Aïtoff (FRA); Léon Binoche (FRA); Jean-Guy Gauthier (FRA); Auguste Giroux (FRA); Constantin Henriquez (HAI); Jean Hervé (FRA); Victor Larchandet (FRA); Hubert Lefèbvre (FRA); Joseph Olivier (FRA); Alexandre Pharamond (FRA); Frantz Reichel (FRA); André Rischmann (FRA); André Roosevelt (USA); Emile Sarrade (FRA)	France (FRA); Union des Sociétés Françaises de Sports Athlétiques	ZZX	FRA	(Note: Only three teams participated in the inaugural rugby event at the Olympics and only two games were contested. France, represented by Union des Sociétés Françaises, played both Germany (FC 1880 Frankfurt) and Great Britain (Moseley Wanderers), the French winning both matches. The IOC classified the side from France, with Constantin Henriquez being from Haiti, until 2024 as a "Mixed Team". Further, André Roosevelt, an American born in France, was also on the French team.)
Gold	Sailing; 2–3 ton (race 1)	Mixed team Frédéric Blanchy (FRA); E. William Exshaw (GBR); Jacques Le Lavasseur (FRA)	France (FRA) "Ollé"	ZZX	FRA	(Note: The yacht "Ollé" of William Exshaw (GBR) was the winner of both races in the 2-3 ton class, over 19 km (one long and two short rounds). Helmsman Exshaw lived in France and had two French crew members, making it a multi-national team.)
Gold	Sailing; 2–3 ton (race 2)	Mixed team Frédéric Blanchy (FRA); E. William Exshaw (GBR); Jacques Le Lavasseur (FRA)	France (FRA) "Ollé"	ZZX	FRA	(Note: The yacht "Ollé" of William Exshaw (GBR) was the winner of both races in the 2-3 ton class, over 19 km (one long and two short rounds). Helmsman Exshaw lived in France and had two French crew members, making it a multi-national team.)
Gold	Water Polo	Mixed team Thomas Coe (GBR); Robert Crawshaw (GBR); William Henry (GBR); John Arthur Jarvis (GBR); Peter Kemp (GBR); Victor Lindberg (NZL); Frederick Stapleton (GBR)	Great Britain (GBR); Osborne Swimming Club	ZZX	GBR	(Note: Victor Lindberg, a champion swimmer in New Zealand and Australia, arrived in England a month before the 1900 Summer Olympics. Selected by the Royal Life Saving Society and granted temporary membership in the Osborne Swimming Club, he competed in water polo and played in all three of the club' matches, winning a gold medal for Great Britain. Lindberg’s nationality is complex: he was born in Fiji to Swedish and Irish parents and grew up in New Zealand, while representing a British club in Paris. Following the precedent set for the Australian Frederick Lane, he is classified as a New Zealander rather than British.)
Bronze	Water Polo	Mixed team Bill Burgess (GBR); Jules Clévenot / Devenot (FRA); Alphonse Decuyper (FRA); Louis Laufray (FRA); Henri Peslier (FRA); Paul Vasseur (FRA); Auguste Pesloy (FRA)	France (FRA); Libellule de Paris	ZZX	FRA	(Note: Libellule de Paris has been listed as having a player by the name of "Devenot", but Olympic historian Bill Mallon identifies this player as Jules Clévenot, who also competed in swimming events at the Games. Their squad also included Bill Burgess, a Briton who would later become the second man to swim across the English Channel.)
Silver	Cricket	Mixed team William Anderson (GBR); William Attrill (FRA); John Braid (GBR); W. Browning (GBR); Robert Horne (GBR); Timothée Jordan (GBR); Arthur MacEvoy (GBR); Douglas Robinson (GBR); H. F. Roques (FRA); A. J. Schneidau (GBR); Henry Terry (GBR); Philip Tomalin (FRA)	France (FRA); Union des Sociétés Français de Sports Athletiques	ZZX	FRA	(Note: The French team included ten British nationals, two of whom were born in France, and two Frenchmen: as such, it is considered to be a mixed team, though it is currently listed by the IOC as representing France.)
Silver	Tug of war	Mixed team Raymond Basset (FRA); Jean Collas (FRA); Charles Gondouin (FRA); Joseph Roffo (FRA); Émile Sarrade (FRA); Francisco Henríquez de Zubiría (COL)	France (FRA); Racing Club de France	ZZX	FRA	(Note: The French team, representing the Racing Club de France, included 3 players who were later part of the gold-winning rugby team for France. Jean Collas, Charles Gondouin, and Émile Sarrade were all part of both teams, while it is often misreported that another of their rugby teammates, the Haitian-born Constantin Henriquez was also on the tug of war team, but this was a case of mistaken identity due to their similar names, with Colombian-born Francisco Henríquez de Zubiría taking part in the tug of war.)
Bronze	Football	Mixed team Marius Delbecque (BEL); Hendrik van Heuckelum (NED); Raul Kelecom (BEL); Marcel Leboutte (BEL); Lucien Londot (BEL); Ernest Moreau de Melen (BEL); Eugène Neefs (BEL); Gustave Pelgrims (BEL); Alphonse Renier (BEL); Hilaire Spanoghe (BEL); Eric Thornton (GBR)	Belgium (BEL); Université de Bruxelles	ZZX	BEL	(Note: At the 1900 Summer Olympics, an association football tournament was contested for the first time. Only two matches were held between the three club sides, and no medals were awarded. France's representatives were determined by the USFSA, which elected the Parisian champion Club Français. For Belgium, after Racing Club de Bruxelles declined to participate, a student selection with players from the Université libre de Bruxelles was sent by the Federation. The team was reinforced with a few non-students. English club Upton Park F.C. represented Great Britain. The IOC originally credited Great Britain, France and a "Mixed Team" with gold, silver and bronze medals, respectively, as part of its attempt to reconcile early Olympic Games with the modern award scheme. The Belgian team included one British and one Dutch player. In 2024 the bronze medal was reallocated to Belgium.)

== See also ==
- All-time Olympic Games medal table
- List of 1900 Summer Olympics medal winners

== Bibliography ==
- Mallon, Bill (2009). The 1900 Olympic Games: Results for All Competitors in All Events, with Commentary. Results of the early modern Olympics. Jefferson, North Carolina: McFarland & Company. ISBN 978-0-7864-4064-1.
