= Mixed teams at the Olympics =

Mixed team at the Olympics
- IOC code: ZZX
- NOC: Mixed team
- Medals: Gold 4 Silver 2 Bronze 4 Total 10

Summer appearances
- 1896; 1900; 1904

Other related appearances
- 1906 Intercalated Games

In the early editions of the Modern Olympic Games, individuals from different nations were allowed to compete as a team. The International Olympic Committee (IOC) grouped their results together under the mixed team designation.

Until 2024, the International Olympic Committee (IOC) considered all teams in which athletes from different countries competed in the early Modern Olympic Games as mixed teams and used the IOC code ZZX to designate such teams. A total of 25 medals were awarded to the mixed teams in the first three Summer Olympic Games, from 1896 to 1904, with a single alpinism medal being awarded to a mixed team at the 1924 Winter Olympic Games.

In 2024, the IOC changed the definition of such mixed teams. It reallocated medals won by a team, which had represented a club of a particular country at the Olympics to the corresponding country, even if the team included foreign athletes. Only medals won by those teams in which athletes from different countries participated together only for the duration of the Olympics and did not belong to a single club of any country are currently designated under mixed teams. The IOC uses a new IOC code XXB to designate mixed teams under the new criteria. As per the revised definition, a total of ten medals are listed as won by mixed teams.

== Medal tables ==
=== Medals by Games ===
Games	Medallists	Country	Gold	Silver	Bronze	Total	Rank
(Greece) 1896 Athens	4	Australia (1); Germany (1); Great Britain (2)	1	0	1	2	11
(France) 1900 Paris	18	Bohemia (1); Denmark (3); France (2); Great Britain (3); Mexico (3); Sweden (3); United States (3)	1	2	3	6	10
(United States) 1904 St. Louis	3	Cuba (2); United States (1)	1	0	0	1	11
(France) 1924 Chamonix	21	Great Britain (13); India (7); Nepal (1)	1	0	0	1	8
Total			4	2	4	10	

=== Medals by sport ===
Sport	Gold	Silver	Bronze	Total
Tennis	1	2	3	6
Alpinism	1	0	0	1
Fencing	1	0	0	1
Tug of war	1	0	0	1
Polo	0	0	1	1
Totals (5 entries)	4	2	4	10

=== Medalists ===
Medal	Games	Sport	Event	Medalists	Reference
Gold	1896 Athens	Tennis	Men's doubles	John Boland (GBR), Fritz Traun (GER)	
Gold	1900 Paris	Tug of War	Men's Team	Edgar Aabye (DEN), Eugen Schmidt (DEN), Charles Winckler (DEN), August Nilsson (SWE), Gustaf Söderström (SWE), Karl Staaf (SWE)	
Gold	1904 St. Louis	Fencing	Foil Team men	Ramón Fonst (CUB), Manuel Díaz (CUB), Albertson Van Zo Post (USA)	
Gold	1924 Chamonix	Alpinism	Men's team	1922 British Mount Everest expedition team	
Silver	1900 Paris	Tennis	Men's doubles	Max Decugis (FRA), Basil Spalding de Garmendia (USA)	
Silver	1900 Paris	Tennis	Mixed doubles	Yvonne Prévost (FRA), Harold Mahony (GBR)	
Bronze	1896 Athens	Tennis	Men's doubles	Edwin Flack (AUS), George Stuart Robertson (GBR)	
Bronze	1900 Paris	Polo	Men's team	Eustaquio de Escandón (MEX), Manuel de Escandón (MEX), Pablo de Escandón (MEX), Guillermo Hayden Wright (USA)	
Bronze	1900 Paris	Tennis	Mixed doubles	Marion Jones Farquhar (USA), Laurence Doherty (GBR)	
Bronze	1900 Paris	Tennis	Mixed doubles	Hedwiga Rosenbaumová (BOH), Archibald Warden (GBR)	

=== Medals by nation combination ===
Nations	Gold	Silver	Bronze	Total
Cuba; United States	1	0	0	1
Denmark; Sweden	1	0	0	1
Germany; Great Britain	1	0	0	1
Great Britain; India; Nepal	1	0	0	1
France; Great Britain	0	1	0	1
France; United States	0	1	0	1
Australia; Great Britain	0	0	1	1
Bohemia; Great Britain	0	0	1	1
Great Britain; United States	0	0	1	1
Mexico; United States	0	0	1	1
Total	4	2	4	10

== Medal tables (pre-2024) ==
=== Medals by Games ===
Games	Medalists	Country	Gold	Silver	Bronze	Total medals	Rank
1896 Athens	4	Australia (1); Germany (1); Great Britain (2)	1	0	1	2	11
1900 Paris	100	Australia (1); Belgium (9); Bohemia (1); Colombia (1); Denmark (3); France (35); Great Britain (31); Haiti (1); Mexico (3); Netherlands (4); New Zealand (1); Sweden (3); United States (7)	8	5	6	19	4
1904 St. Louis	19	Austria (1); Cuba (2); France (1); Germany (1); United States (14)	2	1	1	4	6
1924 Chamonix	21	Great Britain (13); India (7); Nepal (1)	1	0	0	1	8
Total	144		12	6	8	26	55

=== Redistribution of medals in 2024 ===
Team	Games	Gold	Silver	Bronze	Total
Mixed team	1900 Paris	-7	-3	-3	-13
France	1900 Paris	3	2	2	7
Great Britain	1900 Paris	3	1	0	4
Netherlands	1900 Paris	1	0	0	1
Belgium	1900 Paris	0	0	1	1
Mixed team	1904 St. Louis	-1	-1	-1	-3
United States	1904 St. Louis	1	1	1	3

=== Medals by sport ===
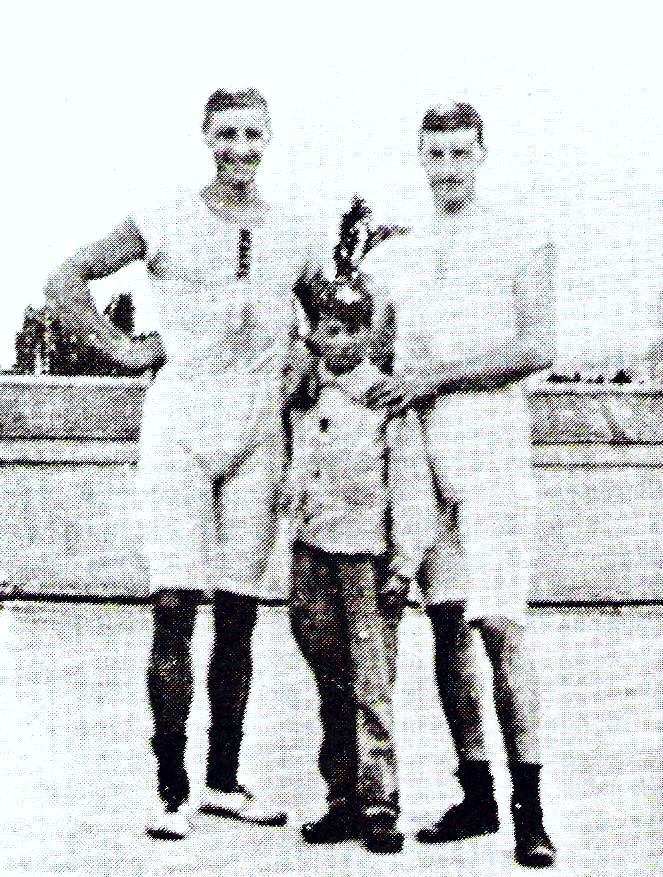
François Brandt (left) and Roelof Klein of Netherlands with their coxswain, an unknown French boy, at the 1900 Olympics

Sport	Gold	Silver	Bronze	Total
Tug of war	1	1	1	3
Sailing	2	0	0	2
Tennis	1	2	3	6
Polo	1	1	2	4
Athletics	1	1	0	2
Water polo	1	0	1	2
Fencing	1	0	0	1
Rowing	1	0	0	1
Rugby	1	0	0	1
Gymnastics	1	0	0	1
Alpinism	1	0	0	1
Cricket	0	1	0	1
Football	0	0	1	1
Total	12	6	8	26

=== List of medalists ===
The below table list only the medalists, whose medals were reclassified in 2024 by the IOC.

Medal	Name	Games	Sport	Event	Medalists	Reference
Gold	Great Britain	1900 Paris	Polo	Men's team	Foxhunters Hurlingham GBR: John Beresford, Denis St. George Daly, Alfred Rawlinson; USA: Foxhall Parker Keene, Frank MacKey	
Gold	France	1900 Paris	Rugby	Men's team	France national rugby team FRA: Abel Albert, Jean Collas, Charles Gondouin, Wladimir Aïtoff, Léon Binoche, Jean-Guy Gauthier, Auguste Giroux, Jean Hervé, Victor Larchandet, Hubert Lefèbvre, Joseph Olivier, Alexandre Pharamond, Frantz Reichel, André Rischmann, Emile Sarrade; USA: André Roosevelt; HAI: Constantin Henriquez	
Gold	France	1900 Paris	Sailing	2 - 3 Ton Race One	William Exshaw (GBR), Frédéric Blanchy (FRA), Jacques Le Lavasseur (FRA)	
Gold	France	1900 Paris	Sailing	2 - 3 Ton Race Two	William Exshaw (GBR), Frédéric Blanchy (FRA), Jacques Le Lavasseur (FRA)	
Gold	Netherlands	1900 Paris	Rowing	Rowing pair-oared shell with coxswain men	François Brandt (NED), Roelof Klein (NED), Hermanus Brockmann (NED), Unknown French boy (FRA)	
Gold	Great Britain	1900 Paris	Athletics	5000m team men	Stan Rowley (AUS), Alfred Tysoe (GBR), Sidney Robinson (GBR), John Rimmer (GBR), Charles Bennett (GBR)	
Gold	Great Britain	1900 Paris	Water Polo	Men's team	Osborne Swimming Club of Manchester GBR: Thomas Coe, Robert Crawshaw, William Henry, John Arthur Jarvis, Peter Kemp, Frederick Stapleton; NZL: Victor Lindberg	
Gold	United States	1904 St. Louis	Gymnastics	Artistic Team All-Around, Apparatus Work and Field Sports Men	Philadelphia Turngemeinde USA: John Grieb, Anton Heida, Max Hess, Philip Kassel, Ernst Reckeweg; AUT: Julius Lenhart	
Silver	Great Britain	1900 Paris	Polo	Men's team	BLO Polo Club Rugby GBR: Walter Buckmaster, Frederick Freake; USA: Walter McCreery; FRA: Jean de Madre	
Silver	France	1900 Paris	Cricket	Men's team	French Athletic Club Union FRA: William Attrill, F. Roques, Philip Tomalin; GBR: William Anderson, John Braid, W. Browning, Robert Horne, Timothée Jordan, Arthur MacEvoy, Douglas Robinson, A. J. Schneidau, Henry Terry	
Silver	France	1900 Paris	Tug of War	Men's team	Racing Club de France FRA: Raymond Basset, Jean Collas, Charles Gondouin, Joseph Roffo, Émile Sarrade; COL: Francisco Henríquez de Zubiría	
Silver	United States	1904 St. Louis	Athletics	4 miles team men	Chicago Athletic Association USA: James Lightbody, William Frank Verner, Lacey Hearn, Sidney Hatch; FRA: Albert Corey	
Bronze	France	1900 Paris	Polo	Men's team	Bagatelle Polo Club de Paris FRA: Robert Fournier-Sarlovèze, Maurice Raoul-Duval, Édouard Alphonse James de Rothschild; GBR: Frederick Agnew Gill	
Bronze	Belgium	1900 Paris	Football	Men's team	Université de Bruxelles; BEL: Marius Delbecque, Raul Kelecom, Marcel Leboutte, Lucien Londot, Ernest Moreau de Melen, Eugène Neefs, Gustave Pelgrims, Alphonse Renier, Hilaire Spanoghe; NED: Hendrik van Heuckelum; GBR: Eric Thornton	
Bronze	France	1900 Paris	Water Polo	Men's team	Libellule de Paris FRA: Jules Clévenot / Devenot, Alphonse Decuyper, Louis Laufray, Henri Peslier, Paul Vasseur, Auguste Pesloy; GBR: Bill Burgess	
Bronze	United States	1904 St. Louis	Tug of War	Men's team	Southwest Turnverein of St. Louis No. 2 USA: Oscar Friede, Charles Harberkorn, Harry Jacobs, Charles Thias; GER: Frank Kugler	

=== Medals by nation combination ===
Nations	Gold	Silver	Bronze	Total
France; Great Britain	2	2	2	6
Australia; Great Britain	1	0	1	2
Great Britain; United States	1	0	1	2
Cuba; United States	1	0	0	1
Denmark; Sweden	1	0	0	1
France; Netherlands	1	0	0	1
Germany; Great Britain	1	0	0	1
Great Britain; India; Nepal	1	0	0	1
France; Haiti	1	0	0	1
Great Britain; New Zealand	1	0	0	1
Austria; United States	1	0	0	1
France; United States	0	2	0	2
France; Colombia	0	1	0	1
Great Britain; France; United States	0	1	0	1
Bohemia; Great Britain	0	0	1	1
Mexico; United States	0	0	1	1
Germany; United States	0	0	1	1
Great Britain; Belgium; Netherlands	0	0	1	1
Total	12	6	8	26

== See also ==
- Australasia at the Olympics, a combined team consisting of Australian and New Zealand competitors, which competed at the 1908 and 1912 Olympic Games
- Unified Team at the Olympics, a combined team consisting of competitors from post-Soviet states, which competed at the 1992 Winter and Summer Olympics
- Independent Olympians at the Olympic Games
- Refugee Olympic Team at the Olympic Games
- Mixed-NOCs at the Youth Olympics
