= Moseley Wanderers =

English rugby union team

Moseley Wanderers represented Great Britain at the 1900 Summer Olympics at rugby union. They played one game, losing 27–8 to France, winning the Silver medal.

== Rugby Union at the 1900 Olympics ==
Great Britain, France and Germany were the sole participants in the inaugural rugby event at the Olympics. The first game, held on 14 October, was between France and Germany. Despite losing 5–14 at half time France beat Germany 27–17.

The second game saw Moseley Wanderers take on France on the 28 October. France beat the British team 27–8 in front of six thousand people which was the largest crowd of the games. The British squad was shut out in the first half, while France continued the scoring barrage they had experienced in the second half of the Germany match. Serrade scored two tries, bringing his tournament total to five. Joseph Olivier, Jean Collas, and Jean-Guy Gauthier each added a try. No conversions were scored, though André Rischmann's two penalties brought France's first-half total to 21.

Britain actually outscored France in the second half, 8–6, but had little chance of catching up. Joseph Wallis scored a try while J. Henry Birtles made a conversion and a penalty for Britain. Reichel scored his second try of the tournament, and Léon Binoche added a try to bring France's victory to a 27–8 margin.

== The team ==
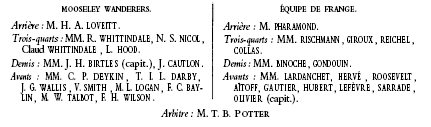
The official Olympic teamsheet

It is unclear how the team was chosen. Four of the players, including the captain J. Henry Birtles, played for Moseley, with a number of others also playing for Midlands-based clubs such as Aston Old Edwardians or Coventry.

== Why were Moseley at the Olympics? ==
How the team came to be chosen to represent Britain at the Olympics is not known according to British sources. On the 28 October the Birmingham Evening Gazette reported:

England v France
Sunday football is neither popular nor frequent here but it is one of the latest diversions that help to make the French Sabbath so much unlike ours.

On Sunday an English fifteen will meet the French Rugby Union at the Paris Exhibition Grounds. The following players representing the English Union left London late last night for the purpose.

And on the 29 October The Times reported:

Football in Paris, October 28

A rugby football match was played today at the Velodrome Municipal at Vincennes between Moseley Wanderers and a team representing the full strength of France. A crowd of 10,000 persons was present. The French team held the advantage from the first and ultimately gained victory by 27 points to 8. The defeat of the Moseley team which was a strong one may be attributed partly to the fatigue of the journey. They only arrived in Paris this morning and have to leave again this evening. – Reuters.

Neither of the reports mention the Olympics with the Evening Gazette reporting on the English Union rather than British team and it is unclear whether the players even realized they were competing in the Olympic Games. However it is clear that fatigue was probably a major contributor to the defeat. At least five of the players are believed to have played for their respective clubs, in England, the day before the game. For example, it is recorded that Clement Deykin represented the Midland Counties on the 24 October, Moseley on 27 October, made the trip to Paris overnight, and then played for the Wanderers the next day.

Nevertheless, Tous les Sports, the official organ of the USFSA, provides in its edition of October 27, 1900 a detailed explanation: The match was difficult to organize. The USFSA had to reach out to a former Stade Français teammate, Whittindale, who was now in Birmingham, to arrange for the famous Moseley FC team to come to Paris. The negotiations were lengthy and challenging. Eventually, they managed to overcome all obstacles, though with one caveat: they would not be getting Moseley's complete first team. Instead, the team arriving from Birmingham under the name "Moseley Wanderers" was still expected to be formidable enough to promise a magnificent match.

== Players ==
- F. C. Bayliss Moseley
- J. Henry Birtles (Captain) Moseley
- James Cantion London Irish
- Arthur Darby Cambridge University
- Clement Deykin Moseley
- Leslie Hood Rosslyn Park
- M. L. Logan London Scottish
- Herbert Loveitt Coventry
- Herbert Nicol Old Edwardians
- V. Smith Old Edwardians
- M. W. Talbot Moseley
- Joseph Wallis Old Edwardians
- Claude Whittindale Aston Old Edwardians
- Raymond Whittindale
- Francis Wilson Old Crusaders
