= Leslie Hood =

English rugby union player and wrestler (1876–1932)

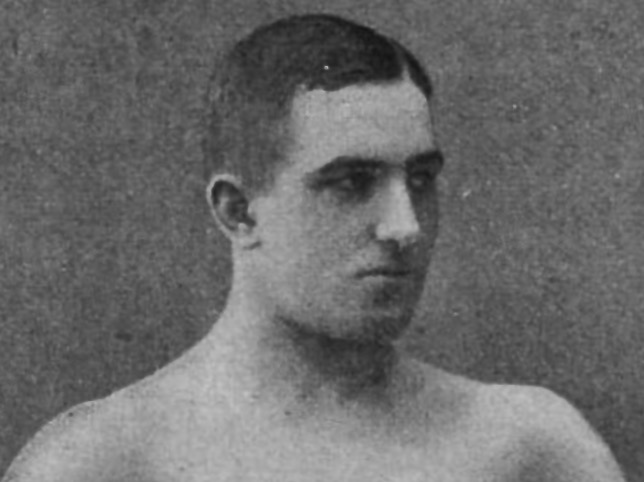
- Hood photographed in 1899

Personal information
- Born: 13 September 1876 York, England
- Died: 23 September 1932 (aged 56) Whalley Range, Manchester, England
- Resting place: Manchester Crematorium (ashes scattered)
- Education: St Peter's School, York, England
- Occupations: Sportsperson; business director
- Height: 5 ft 7.25 in (171 cm)
- Weight: 10 st 9 lb (149 lb; 68 kg) (Note: Height and weight as recorded in 1899.)

Sport
- Sport: Rugby union (1894–1902); Amateur wrestling (1900–01); Winter sports: Skeleton (1911); Ice hockey (1911–13); Ice dance (1913–16)
- Club: Rugby union: York (1894–95); Hammersmith (1896–98); Rosslyn Park (1898–1902)
Medal record
Olympic Games
Men's rugby union
Representing Great Britain
Silver medal – second place	1900 Paris	Team competition
12th amateur wrestling championships
Men's catch-as-catch-can
Winner	1901 National Sporting Club	12 st (76 kg) category
Cresta Run
Skeleton
Second place	1911 St. Moritz	Bott handicap

Leslie Hood (13 September 1876 – 23 September 1932) was an English rugby union player. He competed at the 1900 Summer Olympics and won silver as part of the Great Britain team in what was the first rugby union competition at an Olympic Games. He also competed in amateur catch-as-catch-can wrestling competitions and played ice hockey at Manchester. He was born in York, the third son of William Hood, a general practitioner in practice at Castlegate, York. Along with his three brothers, he was educated at St Peter's School, York. He was a good all-round sportsperson but not as academically gifted as his siblings.

In 1896, he joined Hammersmith rugby union club as a wing three-quarter back, completing two seasons with the club, before joining Rosslyn Park rugby club. In 1899, he entered Eugen Sandow's bodybuilding competition at Crystal Palace Park and won a gold medal. In 1901, he won the twelfth amateur Cumberland and Westmorland wrestling championships in the 12 stone (76 kilograms) category. He retained a life-long interest in winter sports and mountaineering, and in 1911, he competed in the Bott handicap on the Cresta Run at St. Moritz, Engadine in Switzerland.

Hood excelled at ice skating, and in the 1910s, he would compete in ice dance competitions with Ethel Muckelt. He was a founding player in the Manchester ice hockey team that was based at the Ice Palace ice rink in Derby Street, Cheetham. By 1927, he was a director of the Ice Palace and Taylor Brothers & Co., a steel manufacturing company with works at Trafford Park, Trafford, Manchester, and by 1928, he was vice president of the company. He had always maintained a good level of physical fitness, however, in late 1929, he was diagnosed with progressive muscular atrophy and died of pneumonia at a nursing home in Whalley Range, Manchester.

== Early life and family background ==
Hood was born on 13 September 1876 at York. He was the third son of William Hood and Frances "Fanny" Horner, née Lockwood. His father studied medicine at St Bartholomew's, London, and after he qualified, he was appointed surgeon to the Koninklijke West-Indische Maildienst (KWIM, the "Royal West India Mail Service"). In 1863, he began general practice in York and was medical officer to St Mary's Hospital, York. His mother was the only daughter of Joseph William Lockwood, a veterinary surgeon practising at 21 Castlegate, York, the same street where William lived and held his practice. They married on 1 March 1870 at Christ Church, Harrogate.

Hood's eldest brother, Noel Lockwood, was a general practitioner with a practise in York, and until his retirement, honorary surgeon at York County Hospital. He had been on the medical staff of the Royal Sussex County Hospital, Brighton, and the Royal Brompton Hospital, Chelsea London. Hood was best man when Noel married Margery Josephine Williams on 28 June 1911 at St Stephen's, South Kensington. He had captained the Yorkshire field hockey team and played rugby for York. He died on 16 August 1948 at his home in Acomb, York. Hood's youngest brother, William Wells, was an engineer for North Eastern Railway. He served in the Yorkshire Imperial Yeomanry during the Second Boer War and was commissioned a sub‑lieutenant in the Royal Naval Air Service (RNAS) at the start of World War I. In 1916, he was awarded the Order of Saint Anna (third class) by Russia, and in 1918, he received the Distinguished Service Order (DSO).

Hood's younger brother, Clifford, was educated at St Martin's school, Castlegate, before winning an open mathematical scholarship to Exeter School. Around 1897, Clifford went to the United States to work on a ranch, and 1901, emigrated to New Zealand with Hood's elder brother, Williford. The two brothers went on to run a farm in Whangara, before selling and moving to separate farms in Toowoomba, Queensland, Australia. On 10 January 1912, Clifford married Mary Fraser, third daughter of Thomas Fraser, at Pouawa, Gisborne, New Zealand. Around 1920, the family moved back to Gisborne, to run a sheep farm owned by Mary. On 1 June 1924, Clifford killed himself due to concerns over the farm's financial position.

Williford continued to farm at Pittsworth in Darling Downs, Queensland, and married Fannie Filmer Ware, the second daughter of Arthur Ware, on 4 June 1913 at St Paul's Church, Maryborough, Queensland. Williford died on 26 March 1957 in Queensland. Hood's elder sister, Amy Louise Bower, was born on 18 June 1872 at Castlegate. She was a medical doctor, and on 27 October 1898, she married a general practitioner, Alfred Waugh Metcalfe, at St Mary's, Castlegate. Alfred was medical officer for the dispensary in York and a member of the York Medical Society. She died on 12 January 1954 at Southmead Hospital after she fell and broke her thigh at the home of her daughter in Alveston, South Gloucestershire.

== Education ==
Hood was first educated at St Olave's preparatory school in Marygate, York, before going to St Peter's School, York, where his three brothers were educated. He was a good all-round sportsperson, and played cricket and rugby union at wing three-quarter back for the school. Outside of school, he would compete in one-mile novice bicycle races organised by the York Star Cycling Club at the York Cricket Club. Although not as academically gifted as his siblings, in December 1893, he passed the College of Preceptors examination at St Martin's school in the first division of third class. On 6 October 1894, he returned to St Peter's to play in an Old Boys rugby union match against a mixed school team. He scored a try and the Old Boys won by fourteen points to six. In December of the same year, he played in a rugby union match against the school's first team. His brother, Noel, captained the Old Boys, and Hood played at wing three-quarter back. At the time, Hood was playing for the York rugby union second team.

== Sporting career ==
[Hood was] a very powerful wing three‑quarter.

— Henry A. Burlinson, Rosslyn Park honorary secretary, in The Sportsman.

Hood played his first senior rugby union game on 3 October 1896 for Hammersmith Rugby Union Club in the opening match of the season against Twickenham. The match was held at Twickenham and he played at wing three-quarter back. He scored two tries and Hammersmith won by six tries and four goals for thirty-eight points to nil. In the following year, Hammersmith strengthened their side and began training several weeks before their first match. He played in the opening match between Hammersmith and Saracens. The match was held on 2 October 1897 at Saracens' home ground in Park Road, Crouch End, North London, and he played at wing three‑quarter back for Hammersmith. Hammersmith won by one goal with Hood close to scoring a try.

Hood played his final game for Hammersmith in the last match of the 1897–98 season against Streatham on 26 March 1898. The game was played in a blizzard that hindered skilled play, and subsequently, Hammersmith lost by a try and goal to nil. (Note: Hammersmith struggled to find a local home ground, support dwindled, and eventually, in 1908, the club was dissolved.) In the following season, he joined Rosslyn Park Rugby Football Club at wing three-quarter back. His first reported game was on 1 October 1898 against Lennox Football Club at the London Athletic Club ground in Stamford Bridge. He played for Rosslyn Park until his final game on 4 January 1902 against Old Merchant Taylors' FC at the Old Deer Park in Richmond. Old Merchant Taylors won by three tries and two goals to nil.

In October 1900, Hood was selected to play for a British rugby union team in a match against France at the 1900 Summer Olympics in Paris. This would be the first rugby union competition at an Olympic Games. The French were represented by the Union des Sociétés Françaises de Sports Athlétiques (USFSA Union of French Athletic Sports Societies), while the British team was coordinated by Claud Whittindale with the help of a friend in the French Rugby Union. Claud was the son of an auctioneer, and at the time of the competition, he played for Coventry Rugby Football Club.

Claud Whittindale had been a member of the Stade Français rugby union team in Paris since 1898, before joining Aston Old Edwardians Rugby Club at Perry Barr, Birmingham, in 1900. His elder brother, Karl, also played for the club. Some English language sources report that their younger brother, Raymond, was selected to play at the Vélodrome de Vincennes (Vélodrome), Paris. However, it was Karl that was chosen to play at one of the four three-quarter back positions, along with Hood, Claud, and Herbert Nicol (another Aston Old Edwardian). The team was named Moseley Wanderers but had no connection with the Moseley Rugby Club in Birmingham, although some current players at the club had been selected to play in the match.

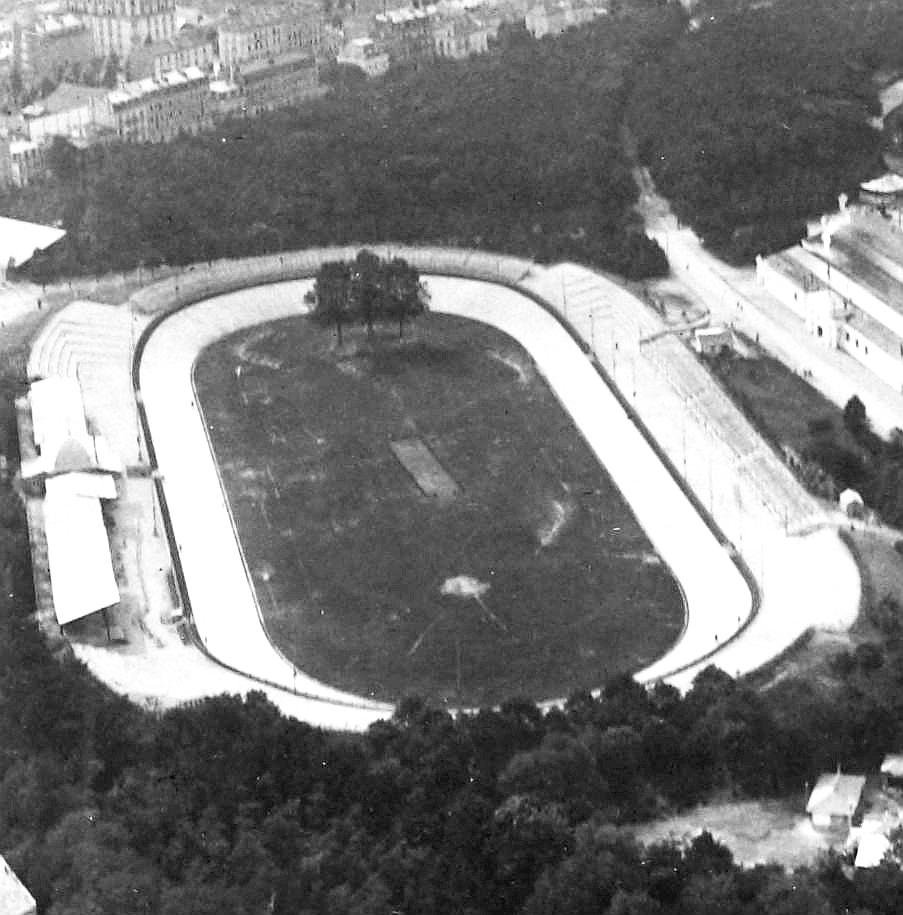
The Vélodrome de Vincennes hosted the rugby union matches at the 1900 Summer Olympics

The team travelled overnight for the match at 3:00 pm on Sunday 28 October 1900, after at least five team members had played for their clubs that day. France scored six tries in the first half and two in the second with Joseph Wallis scoring Britain's only try. Henry Birtles, Britain's captain, converted the goal kick and scored a penalty. France won the game twenty-seven points to eight in front of a six thousand strong crowd at the Vélodrome. (Note: Reported to be the largest audience to watch any of the 1900 Olympic events.) The French press reported that Britain seemed exhausted and lacked the ability to play safe but praised Herbert Loveitt for his composure and skill on the ball. France, although skilled in attack, often failed to defend. Giroux and Reichel were criticised for being clumsy, and Rischmann, for failing to pass the ball.

À leur tour les trois-quarts anglais sont partis, irrésistiblement eux aussi. Rischman et Giroux sont débordés, Pharamond évité par une passe. L'essai est fait! Non, car Gautier s'est élancé en un sprint foudroyant et il atteint L. Hood à 2 métres du but.
In turn, the English three-quarters on the left are irresistible. Rischman and Giroux are overwhelmed, Pharamond is bypassed. The try is complete! No, because Gautier sets off on a lightning sprint and reaches L. Hood 2 metres from the goal.

— Match report in the Paris Exhibition of 1900 supplement that was published in the December 1900 volume of the Chronique de la Jeunesse.

The rugby matches were organised as a round-robin tournament where France, Germany, and Great Britain would play each other in turn. However, the Great Britain versus Germany match did not go ahead as planned on 21 October 1900, as neither team was able to stay in Paris for the entire fifteen days of the competition. France had beaten Germany on 14 October 1900, and consequently, France was awarded gold, and Germany and Britain were credited with silver. In the Olympic regulations, it was stated that "in each match, the winning team will receive an art object; in addition, all players who took part in one of the matches will receive a souvenir." The British team returned home straight after the match, and it is not known if Hood, or any of the team members, received a medal or souvenir.

By April 1899, Hood was living at 30 Guilford Street in Russell Square, and attending strength training courses at Eugen Sandow's Ebury Street school in Belgravia. On 29 November 1899, he entered Sandow's bodybuilding competition at Crystal Palace Park and won a gold medal in a field of eighty-two competitors from Middlesex. In January 1900, he was listed to appear as a competitor in the annual amateur Cumberland and Westmorland wrestling (Cumberland) championships at Earl's Court. However, he failed to appear, as did a number of other competitors that had been listed in the 10.5 stone (67 kilograms) catch-as-catch-can category. In the following year, he entered the twelfth amateur Cumberland championships in the 12 stone (76 kilograms) category. The championships were held on 7 February 1901 at the National Sporting Club in Covent Garden. Described as a "powerfully-built exponent", Hood beat Joe Baddeley, of the Polytechnic Athletic Club, by two falls to one.

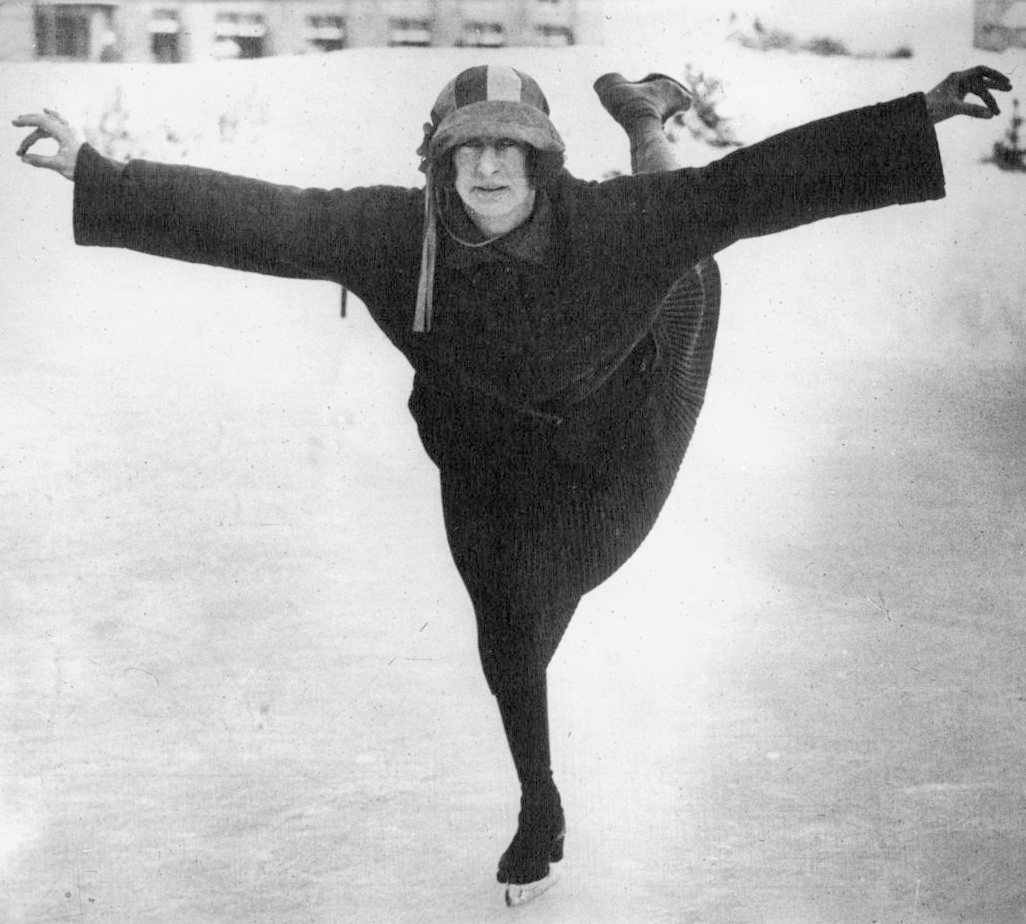
Ethel Muckelt was Hood's partner for ice dance competitions and other social occasions during the 1910s

In 1903, Hood and his brothers, Noel and William, were elected to the membership of the Yorkshire Ramblers' Club. They retained a life-long interest in winter sports and mountaineering, and in August 1905, they climbed the majority of the mountains in the Bernese Alps, that included the Wetterhorn, Jungfrau, Eiger, and Finsteraarhorn. In 1906 and 1908 respectively, Noel and Hood were elected to the Alpine Club. On 15 February 1911, Hood competed in the Bott handicap on the Cresta Run at St. Moritz, Engadine, Switzerland. The race was named after Arden Bott, who, in 1902, had refined the skeleton toboggan that was used in subsequent competitions. The competition attracted fourteen starters and took place over three courses. Kempton Cannon won the competition, beating Hood by just 0.2 seconds.

Hood excelled at ice skating, and while staying in Engadine, would compete in ice dance competitions. In February 1911, Hood and his dance partner, Dina Mancio, won an ice waltzing competition organised by the St. Moritz Skating Association at the Kulm Hotel in St. Moritz. They beat Ethel Muckelt and her dance partner, Henry Landau. Mancio was a famed ice dancer who had won the Italian national cup many times with her dance partner Gino Voli. Landau, a South African, was recruited at the beginning of World War I by the British secret service, now known as MI6, to be a spy handler in the Netherlands. In the 1910s, Hood would partner with Muckelt for ice dance competitions and other social occasions.

Hood was a founding member of the Manchester ice hockey team that was based at the Ice Palace ice rink in Derby Street, Cheetham. Robert Noton Barclay, a former Lord Mayor of Manchester, was also an original member of the team. One of their first matches was against the Prince's club from Hammersmith, London. He showed excellent form but received a cut to his nose, and consequently, missed some of the game. Manchester lost by four goals to nil. He would later become a director of the Ice Palace.

== Later life and death ==
Hood had a number run-ins with the law, including a fine in 1904 for "indecent bathing" in the River Wey at Pyrford, Surrey, and 1926 and 1927, fines for dangerous driving. By 1927, he was a director of Taylor Brothers & Co., a steel manufacturing company with works at Trafford Park, Trafford, Manchester, and by 1928, he was vice president of the company. Later that year, Taylor Brothers was merged with the English Steel Corporation. In November 1931, he resigned from the board of Darlington Forge, a heavy engineering company located at Albert Hill, Darlington, after it had gone into liquidation in 1930. He was also a director of, amongst other companies, the Blake Boiler Wagon and Engineering Company, Dumplington Estates, Miners Silica Quarries, North Lonsdale Tar Macadam, and Roberts & Maginnis.

Hood had always maintained a good level of physical fitness, however, in late 1929, he was diagnosed with progressive muscular atrophy (PMA). He died of hypostatic pneumonia on 23 September 1932 at Doriscourt Nursing Home, Upper Chorlton Road, Whalley Range, Manchester. The funeral service was held on 26 September 1932 at Manchester Crematorium and his ashes later scattered. Formerly of Moss House, Trafford Park, he left an estate of £9,680 18s 3d, with net personalty £9,507 (equivalent to £573,800 in 2025). He left Ethel Muckelt, his former ice dance partner, £208 per year (equivalent to £12,600 in 2025) for the remainder of her life. An obituary appeared in the December 1932 issue of The Peterite, the magazine of his former school, and stated that "Hood was a very fine athlete and gymnast ... other sports at which he excelled were wrestling and skating, at both of which he won many trophies."

== See also ==
- Cresta Run
- Ice hockey in the United Kingdom
- Moseley Wanderers
- Rosslyn Park F.C.
- Rugby union in England
- Wilf Auty
