= William Lister =

William Lister may refer to:

- William Lister (water polo), British water polo player
- Bill Lister (1923–2009), American honky tonk country music singer
- W. Lister Lister (1859–1943), Australian painter
- William Lister (physician) (1756–1830), governor of St Thomas's Hospital in London
- William Cunliffe Lister, British politician and barrister
