= Rugby union at the 1900 Summer Olympics =

Men's rugby union at the Games of the II Olympiad
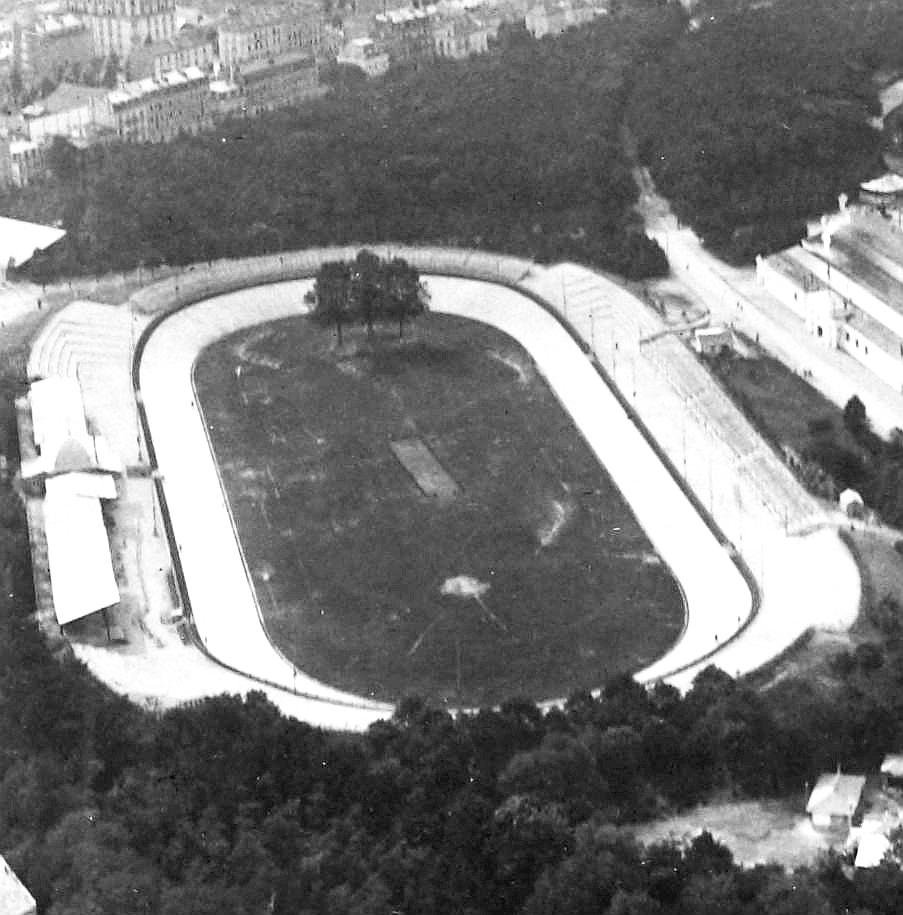
- Vélodrome de Vincennes hosted the matches
- Venue: Vélodrome de Vincennes
- Dates: 14 October 1900; 28 October 1900
- Competitors: 47 from 3 nations

Medalists
1st place, gold medalist(s)		Union des Sociétés Françaises; France
2nd place, silver medalist(s)		FC 1880 Frankfurt; Germany
2nd place, silver medalist(s)		Moseley Wanderers; Great Britain

Rugby union at the 1900 Summer Olympics was played in Paris. Rugby union matches at the 1900 Summer Olympics were held on 14 October and 28 October. Forty-seven athletes competed, most from three nations and including a Haitian and a French-born American.

== Summary ==
France, represented by Union des Sociétés Françaises, Germany, represented mainly by the FC 1880 Frankfurt, and Great Britain, represented by the Moseley Wanderers, all participated in the inaugural rugby event at the Olympics. Only two games were contested, France played both Germany and Great Britain, the French winning both matches.

This saw the gold go to France, and both Germany and Great Britain are credited with silver, with no bronze awarded. For medal purposes, the IOC regarded the side from France until 2024 as a "Mixed Team", as Constantin Henriquez was from Haiti. Further, André Roosevelt, an American born in France, was also on the French team. However, in 2024 the IOC reassigned the medal to France, as well as 12 other medals to particular countries, that were previously considered to be mixed teams at the 1900 Summer Olympics.

== Results ==
=== Match 1 ===
14 Oct

France	27–17	Germany
	Report	Try: E Ludwig, Reitz, Schmierer; Con: Schmierer (2); Drop: Schmierer

Vélodrome de Vincennes, Paris
Attendance: 3,500
Referee: FC Potter-Irwin (England)

Team details

France	Germany

Alexandre Pharamond	15	Hermann Kreuzer
Frantz Reichel	14	Arnold Landvoigt
Jean Collas	13	Heinrich Reitz
Constantin Henriquez	12	Jacob Hermann
Andre Rischmann	11	Erich Ludwig
A. Albert	10	Hugo Betting
Leon Binoche	9	August Schmierer
Jean Herve	8	Albert Amrhein (c)
Victor Lardanchet	7	Richard Ludwig
Jean-Guy Gautier	6	Eduard Poppe
Joseph Olivier (c)	5	Georg Wenderoth
Wladimir Aitoff	4	Willy Hofmeister
Emile Sarrade	3	Hans Latscha
Hubert Lefebvre	2	Adolf Stockhausen
Andre Roosevelt	1	Fritz Muller

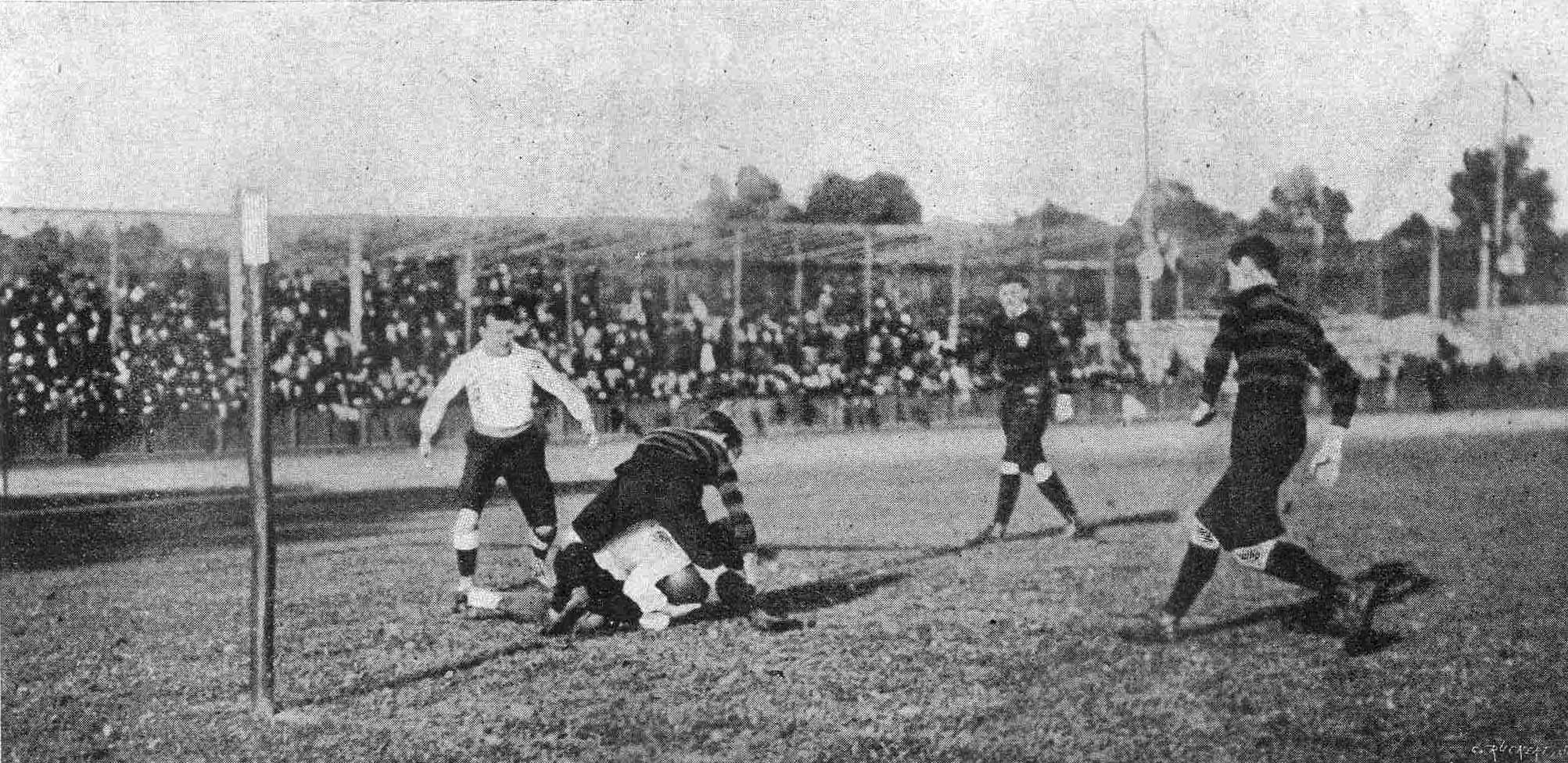
Scene of the France v Germany match played on 14 October

In the first half, France scored a try by Émile Sarrade and a conversion. Germany scored tries by Heinrich Reitz and August Schmierer, with two conversions as well as a drop goal. Under the custom scoring rules of the Olympic tournament (3 points for tries or penalties, 2 points for conversions, 4 points for drop goals), this gave Germany a lead of 14–5.

The second half was vastly different, as Serrade scored two more tries while André Roosevelt also scored two and Frantz Reichel and Abel Albert added one each. Two more conversions were made, bringing France's score to a total of 27. Germany, on the other hand, scored only one try, by one of the Ludwigs. France thus won the match 27–17.

=== Match 2 ===
28 Oct

France	27–8	(United Kingdom) Great Britain
	Report

Vélodrome de Vincennes, Paris
Attendance: 6,000
Referee: M.T.B. Potter

The British team failed to score in the first half, while France continued the scoring barrage they had experienced in the second half of the Germany match. Sarrade scored two tries, bringing his tournament total to five. Joseph Olivier, Jean Collas, and Jean-Guy Gauthier each added a try. No conversions were scored, though André Rischmann's two penalties brought France's first-half total to 21.

Britain actually outscored France in the second half, 8–6, but had little chance of catching up. Joseph Wallis scored a try while J. Henry Birtles made a conversion and a penalty for Britain. Reichel scored his second try of the tournament, and Léon Binoche added a try to bring France's victory to a 27–8 margin.

A Reuters report of the match noted that the British squad's loss may have been in part to fatigue, as the players arrived in Paris only on the morning of the match. A crowd of 10,000 fans witnessed the match.

== Medal table ==
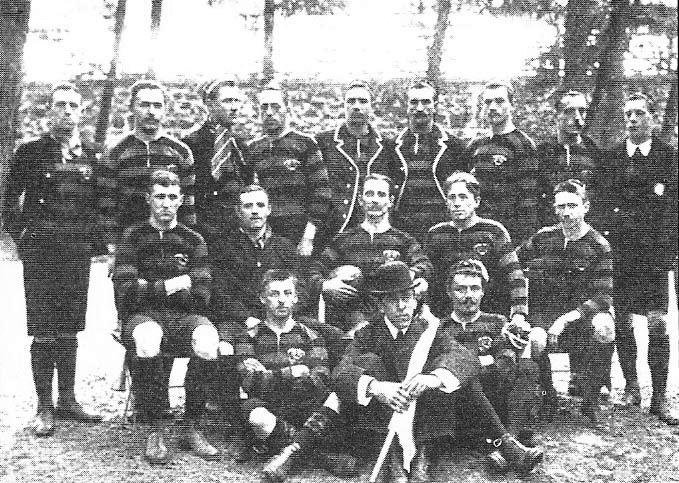
The German squad shared the silver medal with Great Britain

Rank	Team	Matches	Points	Avg points	Tries	Avg tries
1st place, gold medalist(s)	France	2	54	27.00	?	?
2nd place, silver medalist(s)	Germany	1	17	17	?	?
2nd place, silver medalist(s)	(United Kingdom) Great Britain	1	8	8	?	?
3rd place, bronze medalist(s)	(none awarded)					

== Rosters ==
=== France ===
- Wladimir Aïtoff
- Abel Albert
- Léon Binoche
- Jean Collas
- Jean-Guy Gauthier
- Auguste Giroux
- Charles Gondouin
- Constantin Henriquez (HAI)
- Jean Hervé
- Victor Larchandet
- Hubert Lefèbvre
- Joseph Olivier
- Alexandre Pharamond
- Frantz Reichel
- André Rischmann
- André Roosevelt (USA)
- Emile Sarrade

=== Germany ===
- Albert Amrhein
- Hugo Betting
- Jacob Herrmann
- Willy Hofmeister
- Hermann Kreuzer
- Arnold Landvoigt
- Hans Latscha
- Erich Ludwig
- Richard Ludwig
- Fritz Müller
- Eduard Poppe
- Heinrich Reitz
- August Schmierer
- Adolf Stockhausen
- Georg Wenderoth

=== Great Britain ===
- Frank Bayliss
- Henry Birtles
- James Cantion
- Arthur Darby
- Clement Deykin
- Leslie Hood
- M. L. Logan
- Herbert Loveitt
- Herbert Nicol
- V. Smith
- M. W. Talbot
- Joseph Wallis
- Claude Whittindale
- Raymond Whittindale
- Francis Wilson
