= L. Hood =

L. Hood may refer to:

- Leroy Hood (born 1938), American biologist
- Leslie Hood (1876–1932), English rugby union player
