= August Schmierer =

German rugby union player

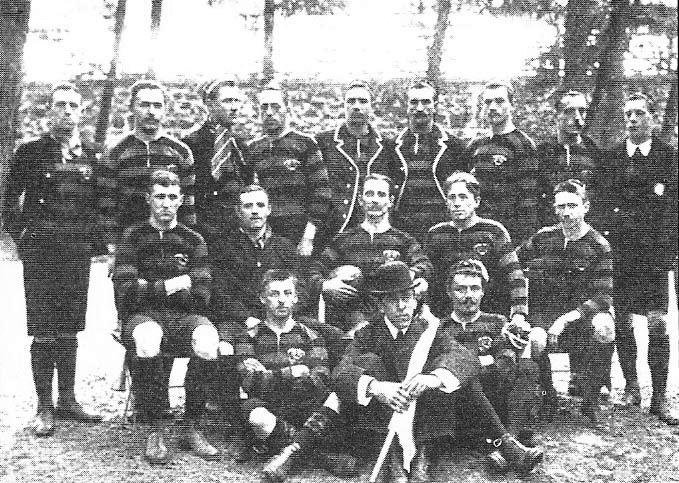
- Germany, represented by FC 1880 Frankfurt, at the 1900 Summer Olympics. (Schmierer on the ground, first from right.)
- Full name: August Friedrich Christian Schmierer
- Born: 28 April 1870 Stuttgart, Kingdom of Württemberg
- Died: unknown

Rugby union career
- Position: Scrum-half
Amateur team(s)
Years	Team	Apps	(Points)
- FC 1880 Frankfurt
–	Cannstatter FC		
Medal record
Men's rugby union
Representing Germany
Olympic Games
Silver medal – second place	1900 Paris	Team competition

August Friedrich Christian Schmierer (born 28 April 1870, date of death unknown) was a German rugby union player who competed in the 1900 Summer Olympics.

He was a member of the German rugby union team, which won the silver medal. Germany was represented at the tournament mainly by the FC 1880 Frankfurt rather than an official national team. Schmierer had left Frankfurt in 1897 and was in 1900 already chairman of the Cannstatter Fußball-Club. But he was invited to the olympic tournament by his former club.
