= 1900 AAA Championships =

Outdoor track and field competition

- Dates: 7 July 1900
- Host city: London, England
- Venue: Stamford Bridge (stadium)
- Level: Senior
- Type: Outdoor
- Events: 14

The 1900 AAA Championships was the 1900 edition of the annual outdoor track and field competition organised by the Amateur Athletic Association (AAA). It was held on Saturday 7 July 1900 at the Stamford Bridge (stadium) in London, England.

The 14 events were the same number as in the previous year and all 14 event disciplines remained the same.

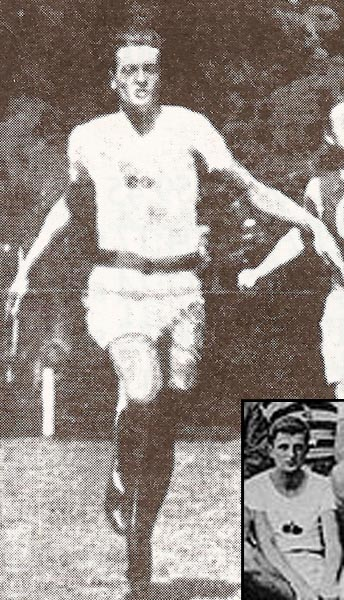
Maxie Long won the 440 Yards

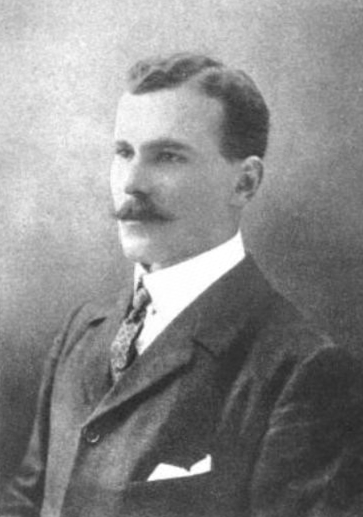
Norman Pritchard of India competed in the hurdles

== Results ==
Event	Gold		Silver		Bronze	
100 yards	(United States) Arthur Duffey	10.0	(United States) Frank Jarvis	½ yd	(United States) Walter Tewksbury	inches
440 yards	(United States) Maxie Long	49.8	(United States) William Maloney	4 yd	(Scotland) William Welsh	2 yd
880 yards	Alfred Tysoe	1:57.8	(United States) John Cregan	10 yd	Jack Densham	15 yd
1 mile	Charles Bennett	4:28.2	George Gazeley	12 yd	(Canada) Alexander Grant	10-15 yd
4 miles	John Rimmer	20:11.0	Charles Bennett	20:24.8	Alfred Shrubb	20:29.8
10 miles	Sidney Robinson	53:14.4	John Rimmer	53:17.0	Arthur Maples	54:55.0
steeplechase	Sidney Robinson	11:08.8	T. W. Walker	100+ yd	Henry Lloyd	
120yd hurdles	(United States) Alvin Kraenzlein	15.4	(British Raj) Norman Pritchard	6 yd	Alfred Trafford	2½ yd
4 miles walk	William Sturgess	30:20.8	Jack Butler	30:35.0	E. Middleton	31:31.0
high jump	(United States) Irving Baxter	1.880	(Leinster) Peter O'Connor; Walter Henderson (United States) Walter Carroll	1.772; 1.772; 1.772	not awarded	
pole jump	(United States) Bascom Johnson	3.45	(United States) Meredith Colket	3.38	(United States) Alexander Coleman	3.25
long jump	(United States) Alvin Kraenzlein	6.96	(Leinster) Peter O'Connor	6.81	(Leinster) Patrick Leahy	6.75
shot put	(United States) Richard Sheldon	13.98	(Leinster) Denis Horgan	13.57	(United States) Josiah McCracken	12.14
hammer throw	(United States) John Flanagan	49.78	(Leinster) Tom Kiely	42.42	(United States) Truxtun Hare	42.30
