= Athletics at the 1900 Summer Olympics – Men's 4000 metres steeplechase =

Athletics at the Olympics

Men's 4000 metres steeplechase at the Games of the II Olympiad
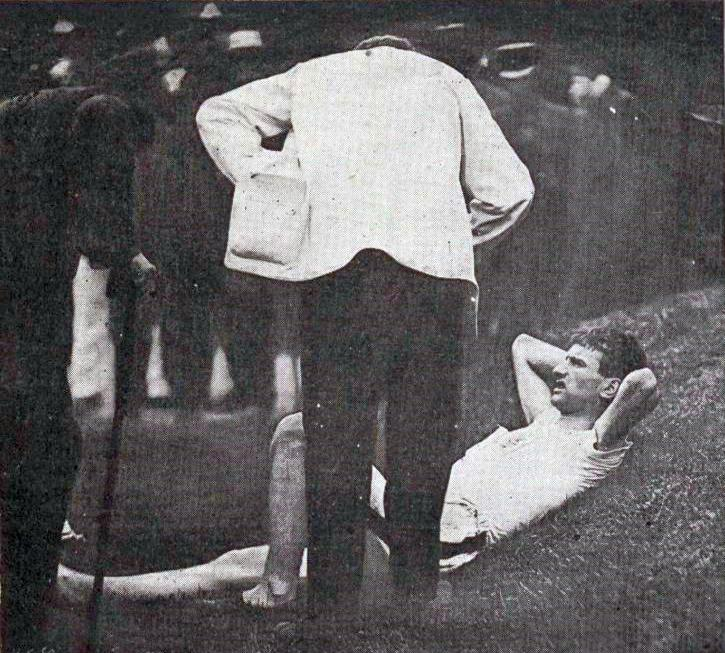
- Sidney Robinson after finishing the race with a bronze medal
- Venue: Bois de Boulogne
- Date: July 16, 1900
- Competitors: 8 from 5 nations
- Winning time: 12:58.4

Medalists
1st place, gold medalist(s)		John Rimmer; Great Britain
2nd place, silver medalist(s)		Charles Bennett; Great Britain
3rd place, bronze medalist(s)		Sidney Robinson; Great Britain

The men's 4000 metres steeplechase was a track & field athletics event at the 1900 Summer Olympics in Paris. It was one of the first two times that a steeplechase race was held at the Olympics, with the 2500 metres version held one day earlier. The 4000 metres steeplechase was held on July 16, 1900. The race was held on a track of 500 metres in circumference. Eight athletes from five nations competed in the longer of the two steeplechase events. The three medallists from the 2500 metre steeplechase also competed in the 4000. The only one among them to win a second medal was Sidney Robinson, who added a bronze medal to the silver he had won earlier. The gold medal was won by John Rimmer of Great Britain, which completed a medal sweep with Rimmer, silver medalist Charles Bennett, and Robinson.

== Background ==
This was the second Olympic steeplechase race (one day after the first), and the only time that an Olympic steeplechase race was held over the distance of 4000 metres. The 4000 metres was the longest distance of any Olympic steeplechase. The 1900 Games introduced steeplechase events with this competition and the 2500 metres steeplechase. The next two Games would each feature a steeplechase, but at different distances: 2590 metres in 1904 and 3200 metres in 1908. There was no steeplechase event in 1912. After World War I, the now-standard 3000 metres steeplechase was introduced and has been held at every Games since. Women's steeplechase, also at 3000 metres, was added in 2008.

== Competition format ==
This steeplechase event featured a single race. The competition involved eight laps of the 500 metre track, complete with standard hurdles as well as stone fences and a water jump. The course was the same as that of the shorter event, but with eight laps instead of five.

== Records ==
None, this was the first and only time the event was held.

== Schedule ==
Date	Time	Round
Monday, 16 July 1900		Final

== Results ==
The British trio dominated this race, finishing in the top three with only two yards separating them: Rimmer was in front from start to finish, with Grant trailing him closely until the final lap, when he broke down and retired.

Chastaniè, the bronze medalist of the 2500 metres steeplechase, finished in fourth, eight yards behind Robinson, with Orton, the gold medalist of the 2500 meters steeplechase, finishing fifth; he had become ill with an intestinal virus overnight and was unable to make the final push that had served him well in the 2500 metres.

Rank	Athlete	Nation	Time
1st place, gold medalist(s)	John Rimmer	Great Britain	12:58.4
2nd place, silver medalist(s)	Charles Bennett	Great Britain	12:58.6
3rd place, bronze medalist(s)	Sidney Robinson	Great Britain	12:58.8
4	Jean Chastanié	France	13:00.2
5	George Orton	Canada	Unknown
6	Franz Duhne	Germany	Unknown
—	Alexander Grant	United States	DNF
—	Thaddeus McClain	United States	DNF

== Sources ==
- International Olympic Committee.
- De Wael, Herman. Herman's Full Olympians: "Athletics 1900". Accessed 18 March 2006. Available electronically at.
- Mallon, Bill (1998). The 1900 Olympic Games, Results for All Competitors in All Events, with Commentary. Jefferson, North Carolina: McFarland & Company, Inc., Publishers. ISBN 0-7864-0378-0.
