= Heinrich Reitz =

German rugby union player

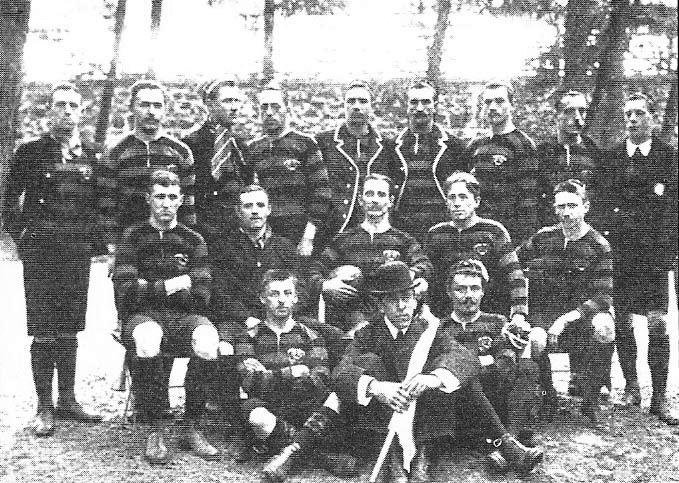
- Germany, represented by FC 1880 Frankfurt, at the 1900 Summer Olympics
- Born: Heinrich Reitz unknown
- Died: unknown

Rugby union career
- Position: Centre
Amateur team(s)
Years	Team	Apps	(Points)
- FC 1880 Frankfurt
Medal record
Men's rugby union
Representing Germany
Olympic Games
Silver medal – second place	1900 Paris	Team competition

Heinrich Reitz was a German rugby union player who competed in the 1900 Summer Olympics.

He was a member of the German rugby union team, which won the silver medal. Germany was represented at the tournament by the FC 1880 Frankfurt rather than an official national team.
