= Clement Deykin =

British rugby union player

Olympic medal record

Men's rugby union

Representing Great Britain
Silver medal – second place	1900 Paris	Team competition

Clement Pemberton Deykin (1 October 1877 – 14 March 1969) was a British rugby union player who competed in the 1900 Summer Olympics. He was born in Lapley, Staffordshire, and played for Moseley Wanderers RFC. He was a member of the British rugby union team, which won the silver medal. He died in Victoria, British Columbia, Canada.
