= Arthur G. Robertson =

British water polo player

Personal information
- Born: 1879; Manchester, Great Britain

Sport
- Sport: Water polo

Arthur G. Robertson (born 1879, date of death unknown) was a British water polo player. Robertson was a member of the Osborne Swimming Club of Manchester, which fielded the winning team. The International Olympic Committee credits him with a gold medal in water polo at the 1900 Summer Olympics, but this is incorrect as sources contemporary to the Games do not mention him as being part of the squad.
