= Lloyd Hildebrand =

British-French cyclist

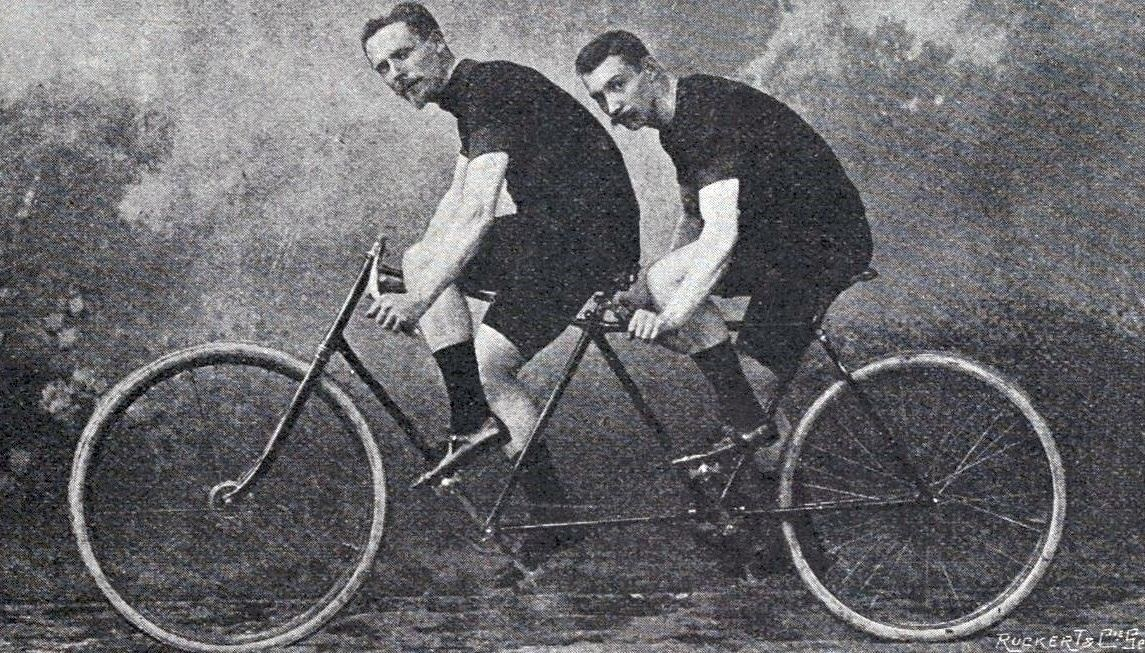
- Hildebrand (right) on a tandem bicycle (1894)

Personal information
- Born: 25 December 1870 Tottenham, England
- Died: 1 April 1924 (aged 53) Levallois-Perret, France

Cycling career
- Sport: Cycling
- Discipline: Racing
- Role: Rider

Professional team
- British Olympic Cycling Team: 1900
Medal record
Representing France
Men's track cycling
Olympic Games
Silver medal – second place	1900 Paris	Men's 25 kilometres
World Championships
Bronze medal – third place	1900 Paris	100 km motor-pace

Lloyd Augustin Biden Hildebrand (25 December 1870, in Tottenham, United Kingdom – 1 April 1924, in Levallois-Perret, France) was a British-born racing cyclist who competed in the late 19th century and early 20th century. Hildebrand was still a British citizen in 1900, although he lived in France for much of his life and married a Frenchwoman. He participated in cycling at the 1900 Summer Olympics in Paris, winning the silver medal in the men's 25 kilometre race. as well as the bronze medal 1900 Track Cycling World Championships.

Historically, his Olympic success was regarded as a British medal, but in 2024 his success was reassigned to France by the International Olympic Committee.
