= Eric Robinson (water polo) =

British water polo player

Sport
- Sport: Water polo

Eric Robinson was a British water polo player who is credited with a gold medal in the 1900 Summer Olympics. Robinson was a member of the Osborne Swimming Club of Manchester, which fielded the winning team. The International Olympic Committee credits him with a gold medal in water polo at the 1900 Summer Olympics, but this is incorrect as sources contemporary to the Games indicate that he was in England too soon after the tournament to have been in Paris.
