= Sidney Robinson (athlete) =

Athletics competitor

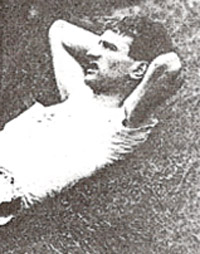

Personal information
- Born: 1 August 1876 Denton, Northamptonshire, England
- Died: 3 February 1959 (aged 84) Long Sutton, Lincolnshire, England

Sport
- Sport: Athletics
- Event: middle-distance running / steeplechase
- Club: Northampton Cycling & Athletics Club
Medal record
Men's athletics
Representing Great Britain
Olympic Games
Gold medal – first place	1900 Paris	5000 metres team race
Silver medal – second place	1900 Paris	2500 metres steeplechase
Bronze medal – third place	1900 Paris	4000 metres steeplechase

Sidney John Robinson (1 August 1876 in Denton, Northamptonshire – 3 February 1959 in Long Sutton, Lincolnshire) was an early twentieth century English middle-distance athlete who specialised in the steeplechase.

== Biography ==
Robinson became the British 10 miles champion after winning the AAA Championships title at the 1898 AAA Championships.

His success continued as he won both the 10 miles and steeplechase titles at the 1900 AAA Championships.

Shortly afterwards, Robinson participated at the 1900 Summer Olympics in Paris for the United Kingdom and won three medals, the silver medal in the 2500 metre event beating the Frenchman Jacques Chastanié to second place and a bronze medal in the 4000 metres steeplechase. He also won the gold medal in the 5000 metres team race as part of a mixed team with Charles Bennett, John Rimmer, Alfred Tysoe and Stan Rowley.

Robinson went on to win further AAA Championships over the steepechase in 1901 and 1903.
