= Colombi =

Colombi is a surname. Notable people with the surname include:

- Arturo Colombi (born 1958), Argentine Radical Civic Union (UCR) politician and former governor of Corrientes Province
- Dario Colombi (1929–2010), Italian bobsledder
- Matteo Colombi (born 1994), Italian footballer
- Giuseppe Colombi (1635–1694), Italian musician and composer
- Henry Colombi (born 1999), American football quarterback
- Ricardo Colombi (born 1957), Argentine lawyer and politician elected Governor of Corrientes Province
- Simone Colombi (born 1991), Italian footballer
- Marchesa Colombi, pen name of Maria Antonietta Torriani
- Matteo Colombi (born 1994), Italian footballer
- Myriam Colombi (1940–2021), French film, television and stage actress
- Nicole Colombi (born 1995), Italian racewalker
- Ricardo Colombi (born 1957), Argentine lawyer and politician
- Simone Colombi (born 1991), Italian professional footballer

== Other ==
- Colombi Hotel, luxury hotel in Freiburg im Breisgau, Germany
