= Victor Larchandet =

France international rugby union player

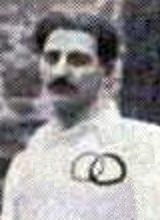
- Victor Lardanchet en 1900
- Full name: Marie Victor Xavier Lardanchet
- Born: 29 December 1863 Desnes, Second French Empire
- Died: 8 November 1936 (aged 72) Nice, France

Rugby union career
International career
Years	Team	Apps	(Points)
1900	France		
Medal record
Men's rugby union
Representing France
Olympic Games
Gold medal – first place	1900 Paris	Team competition

Victor Larchandet (29 December 1863 – 8 November 1936) was a French rugby union player. He competed at the 1900 Summer Olympics and won gold, as part of the French team in what was the first rugby union competition at an Olympic Games.
