= Hubert Lefèbvre =

France international rugby union player

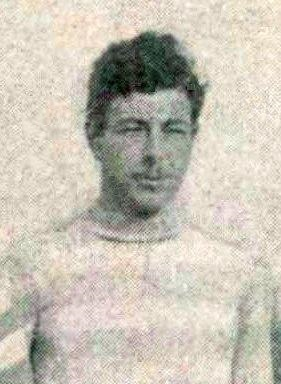
- Lefèbvre in 1899
- Height: 1.68 m (5 ft 6 in)
- Weight: 65 kg (143 lb)

Rugby union career
Senior career
Years	Team	Apps	(Points)
1895-1902	Racing Club de France		
International career
Years	Team	Apps	(Points)
1900-1902	France		
Medal record
Olympic Games
Gold medal – first place	1900 Paris	Team competition

Hubert Jean Daniel Lefèbvre (28 November 1878 in Paris – 26 September 1937 in Labaroche) was a French rugby union player who competed in the 1900 Summer Olympics. He was a member of the French rugby union team, which won the gold medal. Lefèbvre played forward.

Lefèbvre played club rugby with Racing Club de France from 1895 to 1902 and was a member of the 1900 and 1902 French championship teams. In the 1902 final, a 6–0 victory, he scored the final try just before the half.

Lefèbvre was educated at the Lycée Charlemagne and Centrale Graduate School in engineering. He served in World War I, rising to the rank of captain.
