= Raymond Whittindale =

English rugby union player

Olympic medal record

Men's rugby union

Representing Great Britain
| Silver medal – second place | 1900 Paris | Team competition |

Raymond Whittindale (1883 in Kenilworth, England – 9 April 1915 in Cheltenham, England) was a British rugby union player who competed in the 1900 Summer Olympics. He was a member of the British rugby union team, which won the silver medal.
