= Arthur Darby =

English rugby union player

Olympic medal record

Men's rugby union

Representing Great Britain
Silver medal – second place	1900 Paris	Team competition

Arthur John Lovett Darby (9 January 1876 in Chester – 15 January 1960 in Dartmouth, Devon) was a British rugby union player who competed in the 1900 Summer Olympics.

Before representing Britain in the Olympics, Darby was selected to represent England as part of the 1899 Home Nations Championship while playing club rugby for Cambridge University. Darby played only one game for England in a period viewed as very poor for the national team. The next year Darby played for the British rugby union team, which won the silver medal.
