= Alexandre Pharamond =

French rugby union player

Olympic medal record

Men's rugby union

Representing France
Gold medal – first place	1900 Paris	Team competition

Alexandre Emmanuel Pharamond (20 October 1876 in Paris – 4 May 1953 in Neuilly-sur-Seine) was the captain of the French rugby union team in the early 20th century.

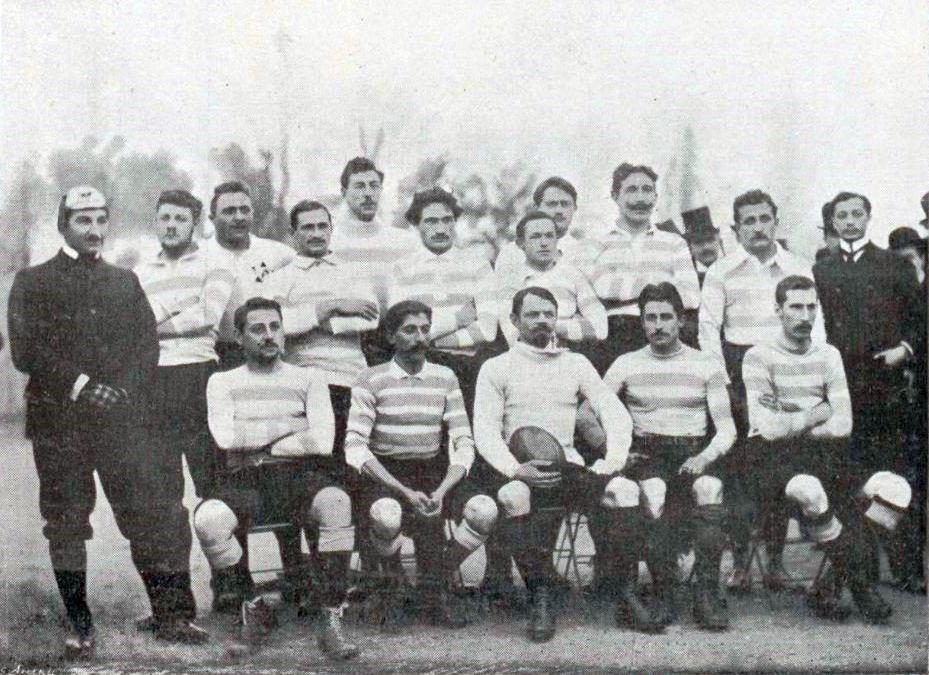

He led the team to the Gold Medal in the 1900 Summer Olympics.
