= M. L. Logan =

GB Olympic rugby union player

Rugby union career
Senior career
Years	Team	Apps	(Points)
	London Scottish F.C.	? (?)	(? (?))
Medal record
Men's rugby union
Representing Great Britain
Olympic Games
Silver medal – second place	1900 Paris	Team competition

M. L. Logan was a British rugby union player. He competed at the 1900 Summer Olympics and won silver as part of the Great Britain team in what was the first rugby union competition at an Olympic Games.
