= Vladimir Aïtoff =

French rugby union footballer

Olympic medal record

Men's rugby union

Representing France
Gold medal – first place	1900 Paris	Team competition

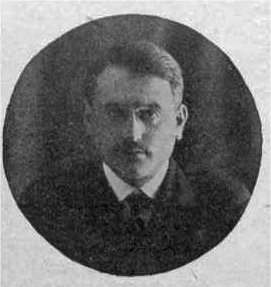
Vladimir Aïtoff picture

Vladimir Aïtoff (5 August 1879 in Paris – 6 September 1963 in Paris) was a French rugby union player who competed in the 1900 Summer Olympics. Aïtoff was a member of the French rugby union team, which won the gold medal.

During World War I, Aïtoff was a doctor in the French Army, with him being awarded with the Croix de Guerre and the Légion d'honneur. After the war he worked as a doctor and was on the Committee of the League to Combat Anti-Semitism. In World War II, he was involved in the French resistance. was imprisoned in both the Buchenwald and Auschwitz concentration camps.

== Biography ==
Aïtoff was the son of Russian revolutionary emigrant and Freemason, David Alexandrovich Aitov (1854-1933).
