= Francis Wilson (rugby union) =

British rugby union player

Olympic medal record

Men's rugby union

Representing Great Britain
Silver medal – second place	1900 Paris	Team competition

Francis Henry Wilson (born 1876, date of death unknown) was a British rugby union player who competed in the 1900 Summer Olympics. He was a member of the British rugby union team, which won the silver medal.
