= Henri Peslier =

French water polo player (1880–1912)

Personal information
- Born: January 4, 1880 Uzel, France
- Died: May 12, 1912 (aged 32) Paris, France

Sport
- Sport: Water polo
Medal record
Representing France
Olympic Games
Bronze medal – third place	1900 Paris	Team competition

Henri Peslier (4 January 1880 – 12 May 1912) was a French Olympic water polo player.

== See also ==
- List of Olympic medalists in water polo (men)
