= Alphonse Decuyper =

French water polo player (1877–1937)

Personal information
- Nationality: France
- Born: 3 April 1877
- Died: 7 June 1937 (aged 60)

Sport
- Sport: Water polo

Senior clubs
- Years: Team
- –: Libellule de Paris
Medal record
Representing France
Olympic Games
Bronze medal – third place	1900 Paris	Team competition

Alphonse Decuyper (3 April 1877 – 7 June 1937) was a French male water polo player. He was a member of the Libellule de Paris water polo team. He won with the team the bronze medal at the 1900 Summer Olympics.

== See also ==
- List of Olympic medalists in water polo (men)
