= Valentine Smith =

British rugby union player

- Born: 21 September 1873 Birmingham, England
- Died: 8 August 1940 (aged 66) Cynwyd, Denbighshire, Wales

Rugby union career
- Position: Forward
Senior career
Years	Team	Apps	(Points)
	Nuneaton Old Edwardians	? (?)	(? (?))
Medal record
Men's rugby union
Representing Great Britain
Olympic Games
Silver medal – second place	1900 Paris	Team competition

Valentine Smith (21 September 1873 – 8 August 1940) was a British rugby union player. He competed at the 1900 Summer Olympics and won silver as part of the Great Britain team in what was the first rugby union competition at an Olympic Games.
