= Frank Bayliss =

British rugby union player

Olympic medal record

Men's rugby union

Representing United Kingdom
Silver medal – second place	1900 Paris	Team competition

Frank Charles Bayliss (5 July 1876 – 20 May 1938) was a British rugby union player. He competed at the 1900 Summer Olympics and won silver as part of the Great Britain team in what was the first rugby union competition at an Olympic Games. He was born in Birmingham and died in London.
