= Jean Hervé =

French rugby union footballer

Olympic medal record

Men's rugby union

Representing France
| Gold medal – first place | 1900 Paris | Team competition |

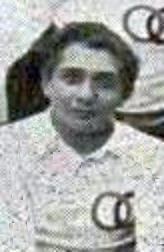

Jean Hervé (30 March 1884 – 27 November 1966) was a French rugby union player. He competed at the 1900 Summer Olympics and won gold as part of the French team in what was the first rugby union competition at an Olympic Games.
