= William Lister (water polo) =

British water polo player

Personal information
- Born: 1882; Manchester, Great Britain
- Died: 1900 (aged 17–18)

Sport
- Sport: Water polo

William Lister (c. 1882 – July 1900) was a British water polo player who is credited with a gold medal in the 1900 Summer Olympics. Lister was a member of the Osborne Swimming Club of Manchester, which fielded the winning team. The International Olympic Committee lists Lister as a gold medalist in the event, but this is incorrect, as he died two weeks before the Games.
