= Claude Whittindale =

English rugby union player

Olympic medal record

Men's rugby union

Representing Great Britain
Silver medal – second place	1900 Paris	Team competition

Claude Whittindale (1881 in Kenilworth, England – 10 February 1907 in Parkstone, England) was a British rugby union player who competed in the 1900 Summer Olympics. He was a member of the British rugby union team, which won the silver medal.
