= Herbert Nicol =

English rugby union player

Olympic medal record

Men's rugby union

Representing Great Britain
Silver medal – second place	1900 Paris	Team competition

Herbert St. John Nicol (12 April 1873 in Birmingham – 10 February 1950 in North Vancouver, British Columbia, Canada) was a British rugby union player who competed in the 1900 Summer Olympics. He was a member of the British rugby union team, which won the silver medal.
