= Tom Coe (water polo) =

British water polo player

Personal information
- Born: November 3, 1873 Manchester, Great Britain
- Died: October 26, 1942 (aged 68) Manchester, Great Britain

Sport
- Sport: Water polo
Medal record
Representing Great Britain
Olympic Games
Gold medal – first place	1900 Paris	Team competition

Thomas Coe (3 November 1873 – 26 October 1942) was a British water polo player who won a gold medal in the 1900 Summer Olympics. Coe was a member of the Osborne Swimming Club of Manchester, which fielded the winning team.

== See also ==
- Great Britain men's Olympic water polo team records and statistics
- List of Olympic champions in men's water polo
- List of Olympic medalists in water polo (men)
