= Robert Crawshaw =

British water polo player and swimmer

Personal information
- Full name: Robert Arnold Crawshaw
- Nationality: British
- Born: 6 March 1869 Bury, England
- Died: 14 September 1952 (aged 83) Burnley, England

Sport
- Sport: Swimming, water polo
- Club: Osborne Swimming Club
Medal record
Representing United Kingdom
Olympic Games
Gold medal – first place	1900 Paris	Team competition

Robert Arnold Crawshaw (6 March 1869 – 14 September 1952) was a British water polo player and swimmer. He won a gold medal in water polo at the 1900 Summer Olympics and finished fourth in the 200 m free style swimming.

== See also ==
- Great Britain men's Olympic water polo team records and statistics
- List of Olympic champions in men's water polo
- List of Olympic medalists in water polo (men)
