= Frederick Stapleton =

British water polo player and swimmer

Personal information
- Nationality: British
- Born: 11 March 1877 Basford, England
- Died: 11 September 1939 (aged 62) Nottingham, England

Sport
- Sport: Swimming, water polo
- Club: Nottingham Swimming Club and Osborne Swimming Club, Manchester
Medal record
Representing United Kingdom
Olympic Games
Gold medal – first place	1900 Paris	Team competition

Frederick Stapleton (11 March 1877 – 9 November 1939) was an English water polo player and swimmer. He won a gold medal in water polo at the 1900 Summer Olympics and finished six and fifth in the 200 m freestyle and 200 m obstacle swimming, respectively representing Great Britain.

== See also ==
- Great Britain men's Olympic water polo team records and statistics
- List of Olympic champions in men's water polo
- List of Olympic medalists in water polo (men)
