= John Rimmer (athlete) =

British athlete

Personal information
- Born: 27 April 1878 Birkdale, England
- Died: 6 June 1962 (aged 84) Anfield, Liverpool, England

Sport
- Sport: Athletics
- Event: middle-distance running
- Club: Southport Harriers
Medal record
Men's athletics
Olympic Games
Representing Great Britain
Gold medal – first place	1900 Paris	4000 metres steeplechase
Gold medal – first place	1900 Paris	5000 metres team race

John Thomas Rimmer (27 April 1878 – 6 June 1962) was a British athlete, winner of two gold medals at the 1900 Summer Olympics. Rimmer won the AAA Championships in 4 miles (6.4 km) at the 1900 AAA Championships. He was born in Birkdale, Merseyside. With two, he jointly held the record for the most Olympic titles in athletics by a British athlete.

== Biography ==
At the Paris Olympics, Rimmer at first participated in the 1500 metres competition, where he finished between seventh and ninth place. On the next day, Rimmer won the gruelling 4000 m steeplechase, beating teammate Charles Bennett by one and half yards. Together with Bennett, Alfred Tysoe, Sidney Robinson and Stan Rowley, Rimmer won a second Olympic title in 5000 m team race, finishing second behind Bennett.

As well as his AAA 4-mile win in 1900, he also came third three years in succession in the 10-mile race from 1899 to 1901. Rimmer also won the 1899 District cross-country event running as a member of Liverpool Harriers AC before joining Southport Harriers, he was unable to defend the title due to the club being outside the District, but he did win the title again in 1909 when running for Sefton Harriers, for whom he became president in 1951 till his death.

Rimmer joined the Liverpool City Police in 1901 and retired as sergeant 30 years later. He continued to run until he was well over the 50 years of age.

John Rimmer died in Anfield, Liverpool, aged 84.

He was proclaimed the "Fastest White Guy in Europe in 1900" on 13 April 2009 as part of the Europe Athletic Association (EAA) awards.
