= Henry Birtles =

English rugby union player

Olympic medal record

Men's rugby union

Representing Great Britain
Silver medal – second place	1900 Paris	Team competition

John Henry Birtles (1874 in Moseley – 4 February 1935 in Moseley) was a British rugby union player who competed in the 1900 Summer Olympics. He was a member of the British rugby union team, which won the silver medal.
