= Herbert Loveitt =

British rugby union player

- Born: Herbert Arthur Loveitt; 8 March 1874 Easenhall, Warwickshire, Great Britain
- Died: 18 February 1909 (aged 34) Coventry, Great Britain
- Height: 180 cm (5 ft 11 in)
- Weight: 71 kg (157 lb)

Rugby union career
- Position: Full-back
Senior career
Years	Team	Apps	(Points)
	Coventry RFC	? (?)	(? (?))
Medal record
Men's rugby union
Representing Great Britain
Olympic Games
Silver medal – second place	1900 Paris	Team competition

Herbert Arthur Loveitt (8 March 1874 – 18 February 1909) was a British rugby union player. He competed at the 1900 Summer Olympics and won silver as part of the Great Britain team in what was the first rugby union competition at an Olympic Games.
