= Denis St. George Daly =

Irish polo player

Medal record

Men's polo

Representing a Mixed team

Olympic Games
Gold medal – first place	1900 Paris	Team competition

Denis St George Daly (5 September 1862 – 16 April 1942) was an Irish polo player in the 1900 Summer Olympics.

== Biography ==
Denis St George Daly was the son of the second Baron Dunsandle and Clanconal and Mary Broderick, but as his parents were unmarried at the time of his birth he could not inherit the title. From 1925 to 1934 he was Joint Master of the Heythrop Hunt. He was part of the Foxhunters Hurlingham polo team which won the gold medal.

He gained the rank of Major in the 18th Hussars. He held the office of Deputy Lieutenant for County Galway. He held the office of Justice of the Peace for Oxfordshire. He lived at Dunsandle, Atheny, County Galway, Ireland and at Over Norton Park, Chipping Norton, Oxfordshire, England.
