= Joseph Wallis (rugby union) =

British rugby union player

- Born: Joseph Godfrey Wallis; 20 June 1873 Kings Norton, Worcestershire, England
- Died: 16 May 1919 (aged 45) Glasgow, Scotland

Rugby union career
Senior career
Years	Team	Apps	(Points)
	Nuneaton Old Edwardians	? (?)	(? (?))
Medal record
Men's rugby union
Representing Great Britain
Olympic Games
Silver medal – second place	1900 Paris	Team competition

Joseph Wallis (20 June 1873 – 16 May 1919) was a British rugby union player. He competed at the 1900 Summer Olympics and won silver as part of the Great Britain team in what was the first rugby union competition at an Olympic Games.
