= Joseph Olivier (rugby union) =

French rugby union player

Olympic medal record

Men's rugby union

Representing France
Gold medal – first place	1900 Paris	Team competition

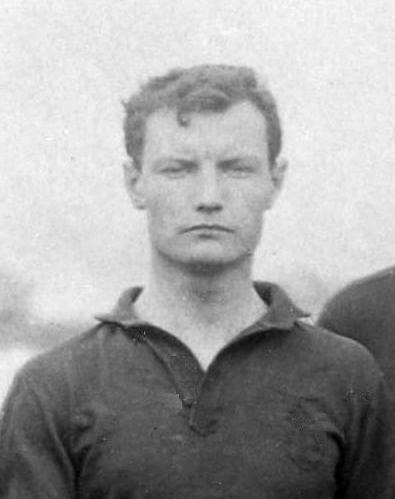
Joseph Olivier champion of France in 1897

Joseph Adolphe Théophile Olivier (2 December 1874 in Paris – 21 May 1901 in Neuilly-sur-Seine) was a French rugby union player who competed in the 1900 Summer Olympics. He was a member of the French rugby union team, which won the gold medal.
