= James Cantion =

British rugby union player

James Cantion was a London Irish rugby union player.

== Olympics ==
In 1900 he was a member of the Moseley Wanderers RFC who represented Great Britain & Ireland in the 1900 Olympic Games.

Britain was one of three teams to compete in the first Olympic rugby games. Britain lost its only game, against France. The game against Germany was cancelled due to travel plans.
