= Walter McCreery =

American athlete (1871–1922)

Olympic medal record

Men's polo

Representing United Kingdom
Silver medal – second place	1900 Paris	Team competition

Walter Adolph McCreery (13 August 1871 in Zürich – 8 November 1922 in Clermont-Ferrand) was an American Polo player who competed in the 1900 Summer Olympics. He received the silver medal in the Mixed team event.

== Biography ==
He was privately educated in the United States and then read law at Magdalene College, Cambridge, achieving a second-class degree.

He was the father of General Sir Richard McCreery, a career soldier of the British Army who commanded the British Eighth Army fighting in the Italian campaign from October 1944 until the end of the Second World War.
