= Jean de Madre =

French polo player

Olympic medal record

Men's polo

Representing United Kingdom
Silver medal – second place	1900 Paris	Team competition

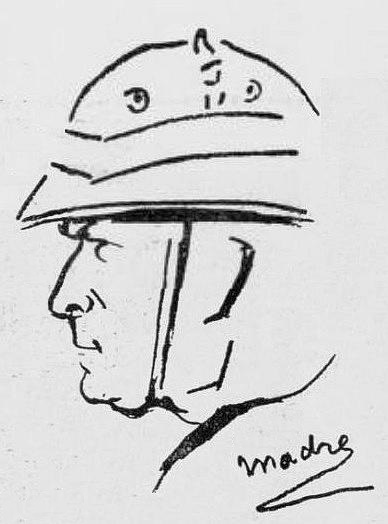
Jean de Madre (par Wag)

Jean Pierre M. J. de Madre, Comte de Loos (17 September 1862 – 2 January 1934) was a French polo player who competed in the 1900 Summer Olympics.

== Biography ==
He was born in Meudon and died in Paris. In 1900 he was part of the BLO Polo Club Rugby polo team which won the silver medal. His older brother David was married to Marie, the only sister of Pierre de Coubertin.

== Tigers Polo Team ==
Johnny was the patron of the Tigers Polo Team; the team traveled between America, England, India and continental Europe playing tournaments. Some of their most important wins being the 1912 Paris Open and the 1923 Coronation Cup in England, they were also winners of the Roehampton Trophy in 1911. The team were well known for their immaculate turn out and attention to detail, the team shirts were pure silk hand embroidered with Gold thread. As well as this Johnny insisted that all four players would ride horses of matching colours e.g. bays in the first chukka, greys in the second, chestnuts in the third etc.

Some of the most notable players to be enlisted to play for Tigers included Indian 10 goalers Jaswant Singh and Jagindar Singh.
