= Frank MacKey =

American polo player (born 1852)

Medal record

Men's polo

Representing a Mixed team

Olympic Games
| Gold medal – first place | 1900 Paris | Team competition |

Frank Joseph MacKey (March 20, 1852 in Gilboa, New York – February 24, 1927 in Minneapolis, Minnesota) was an Irish-American polo player in the 1900 Summer Olympics. He was part of the Foxhunters Hurlingham polo team which won the gold medal. He also was a businessman, founding Household Finance Corp (HSBC Finance) in 1878.

After a long illness, he shot himself at 74 while terminally ill and left to his much younger widow, Olga Leighton (aged 34), his enormous fortune ($500 million). Soon after his death, Olga married a Spanish aristocrat, Antonio Cabeza de Vaca, 10th Marquess of Portago, and became mother of two, the sportsman Alfonso de Portago and the socialite Sol de Moratalla.
