= André Rischmann =

French rugby union player

Olympic medal record

Men's rugby union

Representing France
Gold medal – first place	1900 Paris	Team competition

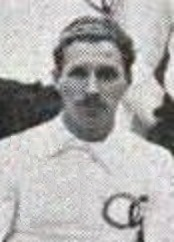
André Rischmann picture

André Félix Rischmann (26 January 1882 in Paris – 9 November 1955 in Paris) was a French rugby union player who competed in the 1900 Summer Olympics. He was a member of the French rugby union team which won the gold medal.
