= Charles Bennett (athlete) =

British athlete (1871–1948)

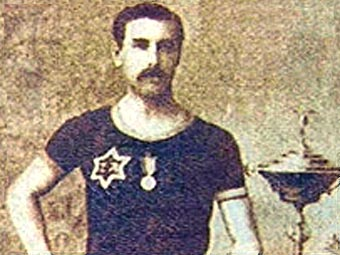

Personal information
- Born: 9 December 1871 Shapwick, Dorset, England
- Died: 18 December 1948 (aged 77) Bournemouth, England

Sport
- Sport: Athletics
- Event: running / Steeplechase
- Club: Finchley Harriers; Portsmouth Harriers
Medal record
Men's athletics
Olympic Games
Representing Great Britain
| Gold medal – first place | 1900 Paris | 1500 metres |
| Gold medal – first place | 1900 Paris | 5000 metre team race |
| Silver medal – second place | 1900 Paris | 4000 metre steeplechase |

Charles Bennett (9 December 1871 – 18 December 1948) was a British athlete, winner of the 1500 metres at the 1900 Summer Olympics and the first British track and field athlete to become Olympic champion. He was a member of Finchley Harriers (founded 1877) which was amalgamated into Hillingdon Athletic Club in 1966.

== Biography ==
Bennett, a train driver born in Shapwick, Dorset, was one of the top British middle-distance runners in his years, winning the British 4 miles title after winning the AAA Championships title at the 1897 AAA Championships and 1898 AAA Championships. Additionally, he won the cross country running title in 1899 and 1900.

Also in 1900, the Olympic year, he won the British title in the mile at the 1900 AAA Championships, qualifying himself for the 1500 m in Paris. That distance had a rather weak field, and Bennett lead throughout the race, defeating local favourite Henri Deloge in 4:06.0. That time was an official world record.

Together with the combined British/Australian 5000 metres team, Bennett won a second Olympic title. Bennett finished first in the race, with an unofficial world record 15:29.2, beating teammate John Rimmer. His third event was the 4000 m steeplechase, in which he just failed to catch up with the same Rimmer in the final part of the race, settling for second place.

Bennett died in Bournemouth, aged 79.

His Olympic achievements were largely forgotten for more than 100 years until his grandson Chris Bennett found his abandoned and overgrown grave in the corner of St Andrew's Churchyard in Kinson. In December 2011 Bennett was commemorated after Anthony Ives Memorials of Bournemouth donated a proper headstone to recognise his feat. The plinth, unveiled on the eve of the year of the 2012 London Olympics, reads: "In loving memory of Charles Bennett 1870-1948. First British track and field athlete to become Olympic Champion. Bennett, known as the Shapwick Express, won two gold medals and a silver at the Paris Games in 1900." The new headstone also remembers Bennett's wife Sarah Lena and reads: "Until the day break."
