= Mixed team at the 1900 Summer Olympics =

- IOC code: ZZX
- NOC: Mixed team
- Competitors: 19 in 3 sports
- Medals: Gold 1 Silver 2 Bronze 3 Total 6

Summer Olympics appearances (overview)
- 1896; 1900; 1904

Other related appearances
- 1906 Intercalated Games

Early Olympic Games allowed for individuals in a team to be from different nations. The International Olympic Committee (IOC) now groups their results together under the mixed team designation. Until 2024 IOC used code ZZX and since 2024 code XXB for designating mixed teams. During the 1900 Summer Olympics, several teams comprising international members won six medals. Until 2024 the IOC attributed to mixed teams 13 more medals, however, since 2024 these medals were reallocated to the particular countries.

== Medalists ==
| Medal | Name | Sport | Event |
|---|---|---|---|
| Gold | Edgar Aabye (DEN); August Nilsson (SWE); Eugen Schmidt (DEN); Gustaf Söderström (SWE); Karl Staaf (SWE); Charles Winckler (DEN) | Tug of war | |
| Silver | Max Décugis (FRA); Basil Spalding de Garmendia (USA) | Tennis | men's doubles |
| Silver | Yvonne Prévost (FRA); Harold Mahony (GBR) | Tennis | mixed doubles |
| Bronze | Marion Jones (USA); Laurence Doherty (GBR) | Tennis | mixed doubles |
| Bronze | Hedwiga Rosenbaumová (BOH); Archibald Warden (GBR) | Tennis | mixed doubles |
| Bronze | Eustaquio de Escandón (MEX), Manuel de Escandón (MEX), Pablo de Escandón (MEX), Guillermo Hayden Wright (USA) | Polo | |

== Alphabetical list of all medallists from mixed teams ==
| 1 | Archibald Warden (GBR) |
| 2 | August Nilsson (SWE) |
| 3 | Basil Spalding de Garmendia (USA) |
| 4 | Charles Winckler (DEN) |
| 5 | Edgar Aabye (DEN) |
| 6 | Eugen Schmidt (DEN) |
| 7 | Eustaquio de Escandón (MEX) |
| 8 | Guillermo Hayden Wright (USA) |
| 9 | Gustaf Söderström (SWE) |
| 10 | Harold Mahony (GBR) |
| 11 | Hedwiga Rosenbaumová (BOH) |
| 12 | Karl Staaf (SWE) |
| 13 | Laurence Doherty (GBR) |
| 14 | Manuel de Escandón (MEX) |
| 15 | Marion Jones Farquhar (USA) |
| 16 | Max Décugis (FRA) |
| 17 | Pablo de Escandón (MEX) |
| 18 | Yvonne Prévost (FRA) |

== Medals, that IOC until 2024 attributed to mixed teams ==
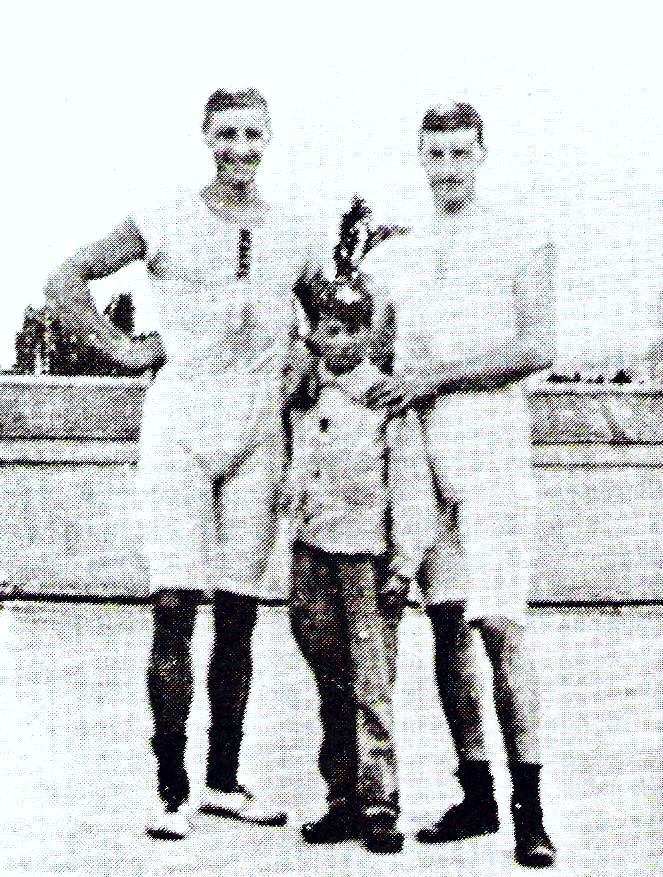
François Brandt (left), Roelof Klein and their coxswain, an unknown French boy, at the 1900 Olympics

Until 2024 the IOC also attributed to mixed teams the following 13 medals. Since 2024 the IOC has reallocated these medals to the particular countries.

| Medal | Name | Sport | Event | Reallocated to |
|---|---|---|---|---|
| Gold | Charles Bennett (GBR); John Rimmer (GBR); Sidney Robinson (GBR); Stan Rowley (AUS); Alfred Tysoe (GBR) | Athletics | 5000 metre team race | Great Britain |
| Gold | Denis St. George Daly (GBR); Foxhall Parker Keene (USA); Frank Mackey (USA); Alfred Rawlinson (GBR); John Beresford (GBR) | Polo | | Great Britain |
| Gold | François Brandt (NED); Hermanus Brockmann (NED); Roelof Klein (NED); Unknown boy (FRA) | Rowing | Coxed pair | Netherlands |
| Gold | Abel Albert (FRA), Jean Collas (FRA), Charles Gondouin (FRA), Wladimir Aïtoff (FRA), Léon Binoche (FRA), Jean-Guy Gauthier (FRA), Auguste Giroux (FRA), Constantin Henriquez (HAI), Jean Hervé (FRA), Victor Larchandet (FRA), Hubert Lefèbvre (FRA), Joseph Olivier (FRA), Alexandre Pharamond (FRA), Frantz Reichel (FRA), André Rischmann (FRA), André Roosevelt (USA), Emile Sarrade (FRA) | Rugby | | France |
| Gold | Frédéric Blanchy (FRA); E. William Exshaw (GBR); Jacques Le Lavasseur (FRA) | Sailing | 2–3 ton (race 1) | France |
| Gold | Frédéric Blanchy (FRA); E. William Exshaw (GBR); Jacques Le Lavasseur (FRA) | Sailing | 2–3 ton (race 2) | France |
| Gold | Thomas Coe (GBR); Robert Crawshaw (GBR); William Henry (GBR); John Arthur Jarvis (GBR); Peter Kemp (GBR); Victor Lindberg (NZL); Frederick Stapleton (GBR) | Water Polo | | Great Britain |
| Silver | William Anderson (GBR); William Attrill (FRA); John Braid (GBR); W. Browning (GBR); Robert Horne (GBR); Timothée Jordan (GBR); Arthur MacEvoy (GBR); Douglas Robinson (GBR); H. F. Roques (FRA); A. J. Schneidau (GBR); Henry Terry (GBR); Philip Tomalin (FRA) | Cricket | | France |
| Silver | Walter McCreery (USA); Frederick Freake (GBR); Walter Buckmaster (GBR); Jean de Madre (FRA) | Polo | | Great Britain |
| Silver | Raymond Basset (FRA); Jean Collas (FRA); Charles Gondouin (FRA); Joseph Roffo (FRA); Émile Sarrade (FRA); Francisco Henríquez de Zubiría (COL) | Tug of war | | France |
| Bronze | Marius Delbecque (BEL); Hendrik van Heuckelum (NED); Raul Kelecom (BEL); Marcel Leboutte (BEL); Lucien Londot (BEL); Ernest Moreau de Melen (BEL); Eugène Neefs (BEL); Gustave Pelgrims (BEL); Alphonse Renier (BEL); Hilaire Spanoghe (BEL); Eric Thornton (GBR) | Football | | Belgium |
| Bronze | Frederick Agnew Gill (GBR); Robert Fournier-Sarlovèze (FRA); Edouard Alphonse de Rothschild (FRA); Maurice Raoul-Duval (FRA) | Polo | | France |
| Bronze | Bill Burgess (GBR); Jules Clévenot / Devenot (FRA); Alphonse Decuyper (FRA); Louis Laufray (FRA); Henri Peslier (FRA); Paul Vasseur (FRA); Auguste Pesloy (FRA) | Water Polo | | France |

== Alphabetical list of all medallists, that IOC until 2024 attributed to mixed teams ==
| 1 | A. Albert (FRA) |
| 2 | A. J. Schneidau (GBR) |
| 3 | Marius Delbecque (BEL) |
| 4 | Alexandre Pharamond (FRA) |
| 5 | Alfred Rawlinson (GBR) |
| 6 | Alfred Tysoe (GBR) |
| 7 | Alphonse Decuyper (FRA) |
| 8 | Alphonse Renier (BEL) |
| 9 | André Rischmann (FRA) |
| 10 | André Roosevelt (USA) |
| 11 | Arthur MacEvoy (GBR) |
| 12 | Auguste Giroux (FRA) |
| 13 | Auguste Pesloy (FRA) |
| 14 | Bill Burgess (GBR) |
| 15 | Charles Bennett (GBR) |
| 16 | Charles Gondouin (FRA) - 2 medals |
| 17 | Constantin Henriquez (HAI) |
| 18 | Denis St. George Daly (GBR) |
| 19 | Douglas Robinson (GBR) |
| 20 | Edouard Alphonse de Rothschild (FRA) |
| 21 | Émile Sarrade (FRA) - 2 medals |
| 22 | Eric Thornton (GBR) |
| 23 | Ernest Moreau de Melen (BEL) |
| 24 | Eugène Neefs (BEL) |
| 25 | H. F. Roques (FRA) |
| 26 | Foxhall Parker Keene (USA) |
| 27 | Francisco Henríquez de Zubiría (COL) |
| 28 | François Brandt (NED) |
| 29 | Frank Mackey (USA) |
| 30 | Frantz Reichel (FRA) |
| 31 | Frédéric Blanchy (FRA) - 2 medals |
| 32 | Frederick Agnew Gill (GBR) |
| 33 | Frederick Freake (GBR) |
| 34 | Frederick Stapleton (GBR) |
| 35 | Gustave Pelgrims (BEL) |
| 36 | Hendrik van Heuckelum (NED) |
| 37 | Henri Peslier (FRA) |
| 38 | Henry Terry (GBR) |
| 39 | Hermanus Brockmann (NED) |
| 40 | Hilaire Spanoghe (BEL) |
| 41 | Hubert Lefèbvre (FRA) |
| 42 | Jacques Le Lavasseur (FRA) - 2 medals |
| 43 | Jean Collas (FRA) - 2 medals |
| 44 | Jean de Madre (FRA) |
| 45 | Jean Hervé (FRA) |
| 46 | Jean-Guy Gauthier (FRA) |
| 47 | John Arthur Jarvis (GBR) |
| 48 | John Beresford (GBR) |
| 49 | John Braid (GBR) |
| 50 | John Rimmer (GBR) |
| 51 | Joseph Olivier (FRA) |
| 52 | Joseph Roffo (FRA) |
| 53 | Jules Clévenot / Devenot (FRA) |
| 54 | Léon Binoche (FRA) |
| 55 | Louis Laufray (FRA) |
| 56 | Lucien Londot (BEL) |
| 57 | Marcel Leboutte (BEL) |
| 58 | Maurice Raoul-Duval (FRA) |
| 59 | Paul Vasseur (FRA) |
| 60 | Peter Kemp (GBR) |
| 61 | Philip Tomalin (FRA) |
| 62 | Raul Kelecom (BEL) |
| 63 | Raymond Basset (FRA) |
| 64 | Robert Crawshaw (GBR) |
| 65 | Robert Fournier-Sarlovèze (FRA) |
| 66 | Robert Horne (GBR) |
| 67 | Roelof Klein (NED) |
| 68 | Sidney Robinson (GBR) |
| 69 | Stan Rowley (AUS) |
| 70 | Thomas Coe (GBR) |
| 71 | Timothée Jordan (GBR) |
| 72 | Victor Larchandet (FRA) |
| 73 | Victor Lindberg (NZL) |
| 74 | W. Browning (GBR) |
| 75 | Walter Buckmaster (GBR) |
| 76 | Walter McCreery (USA) |
| 77 | William Anderson (GBR) |
| 78 | William Attrill (FRA) |
| 79 | William Exshaw (GBR) - 2 medals |
| 80 | William Henry (GBR) |
| 81 | Wladimir Aïtoff (FRA) |
| 82 | Unknown boy (FRA) |
