= Sweden at the 1900 Summer Olympics =

- Flag of Sweden during union with Norway
- IOC code: SWE

in Paris
- Competitors: 10 in 4 sports
- Medals Ranked 20th: Gold 0 Silver 0 Bronze 1 Total 1

Summer Olympics appearances (overview)
- 1896; 1900; 1904; 1908; 1912; 1920; 1924; 1928; 1932; 1936; 1948; 1952; 1956; 1960; 1964; 1968; 1972; 1976; 1980; 1984; 1988; 1992; 1996; 2000; 2004; 2008; 2012; 2016; 2020; 2024

Other related appearances
- 1906 Intercalated Games

Sweden competed at the 1900 Summer Olympics in Paris under the IOC country code SWE. It was the second appearance of the European nation. Swedish results are typically separated from those of Norwegian competitors despite the personal union of the two kingdoms.

== Medalists ==
Gold medals were not given at the 1900 Games. A silver medal was given for first place, and a bronze medal was given for second. The International Olympic Committee has retroactively assigned gold, silver, and bronze medals to competitors who earned 1st, 2nd, and 3rd-place finishes, respectively, in order to bring early Olympics in line with current awards.

=== Gold ===
Medal	Name	Sport	Event	Date
Bronze	Ernst Fast	Athletics	Men's marathon	19 July

Also three Swedish athletes, August Nilsson, Gustaf Söderström and Karl Gustaf Staaf, were part of a mixed team with three Danish athletes that won the Tug of War competition.

== Results by event ==
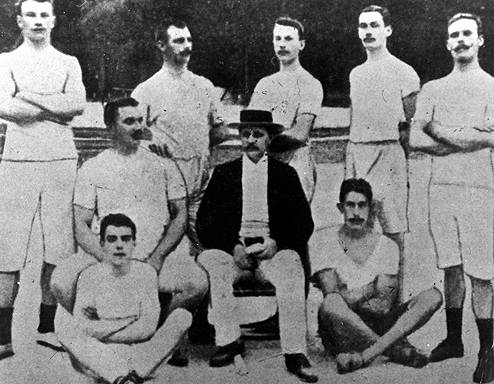
The Swedish athletes at the 1900 Summer Olympics in Paris. Standing from the left: Karl Gustaf Staaf, August Nilsson, Isaac Westergren, Tore Blom, Johan F Nyström. Sitting: Gustaf Söderström, F Berg (leader). On the ground: Ernst Fast and Eric Lemming.

=== Aquatics ===
==== Swimming ====
Sweden was represented by one swimmer in its first Olympic swimming appearance. Erickson advanced to the final in two of his three events, but won no medals.

Swimmer	Event	Semifinals		Final	
Swimmer	Event	Result	Rank	Result	Rank
Erik Erickson	Men's 200 metre freestyle	3:05.8	4	did not advance	
Erik Erickson	Men's 1000 metre freestyle	17:41.2	3 q	17:50.0	9
Erik Erickson	Men's 200 metre backstroke	4:05.4	4 q	3:56.4	8

=== Athletics ===
8 Swedish athletes competed in 11 events, Ernst Fast won Sweden's first Olympic Medal, a bronze medal in the marathon.

Track and road events

Athlete	Event	Heat		Semifinal		Repechage		Final	
Athlete	Event	Result	Rank	Result	Rank	Result	Rank	Result	Rank
Isaac Westergren	Men's 60 metres	Unknown	4–5	—N/a				did not advance	
Isaac Westergren	Men's 100 metres	Unknown	4	did not advance					
Ernst Fast	Men's marathon	—N/a						3:37:14.0	3rd place, bronze medalist(s)
Johan Nyström	Men's marathon	—N/a						DNF	–

Field events

Athlete	Event	Qualifier		Final	
Athlete	Event	Result	Rank	Result	Rank
Tore Blom	Long jump	5.770	11	did not advance	
Eric Lemming	Long jump	5.500	12	did not advance	
Eric Lemming	Men's triple jump	—N/a		Unknown	7–13
Karl Staaf	Men's triple jump	—N/a		Unknown	7–13
Tore Blom	Men's high jump	—N/a		1.50	8
Eric Lemming	Men's high jump	—N/a		1.70	4
Eric Lemming	Men's pole vault	—N/a		3.10	4
August Nilsson	Men's pole vault	—N/a		2.60	8
Karl Staaf	Men's pole vault	—N/a		2.80	7
Karl Staaf	Men's standing triple jump	—N/a		Unknown	5–10
August Nilsson	Men's shot put	10.86	9	did not advance	
Gustaf Söderström	Men's shot put	11.18	6	did not advance	
Eric Lemming	Men's discus throw	32.50	8	did not advance	
Gustaf Söderström	Men's discus throw	33.07	6	did not advance	
Eric Lemming	Men's hammer throw	—N/a		Unknown	4
Karl Staaf	Men's hammer throw	—N/a		Unknown	5

=== Fencing ===
Sweden first competed in fencing at the Olympics in the sport's second appearance. The nation sent one fencer.

Fencer	Event	Round 1		Quarterfinals		Repechage		Semifinals		Final	
Fencer	Event	Result	Rank	Result	Rank	Result	Rank	Result	Rank	Result	Rank
Emil Fick	Men's foil	Not advanced		did not advance							

=== Tug of war ===
Sweden contributed 3 of the 6 members of the gold medal-winning team in the inaugural tug of war competition.

Athletes	Event	Final	Rank
Athletes	Event	Opposition Result	Rank
Edgar Aabye (DEN); August Nilsson; Eugen Schmidt (DEN); Gustaf Söderström; Karl Gustaf Staaf; Charles Winckler (DEN)	Tug of war	France; W 2–0	1st place, gold medalist(s)
