= 1899–1900 French Rugby Union Championship =

Championnat de France de rugby 1899–1900
- Countries: France
- Champions: Racing Club de France
- Runners-up: SBUC

The 1899–1900 French Rugby Union Championship was won by Racing club de France that defeated SBUC in the final.

The winner of the tournament of province was SBUC that won the championship of Garonne, after the F.C. Lyon refused to participate at the final stage. Stade Bordelais beat S.O.E. Toulouse that leave the field contesting the hard play of their opponents.

== Teams participating ==
Was the eight winner of regional championships .

- Paris: Racing Club de France
- North-West': Le Havre Athletic Club
- Centre-West: Vélo Sport Chartrain
- South West: F.C. Lyon
- Alps : Stade grenoblois
- South: Stade Olympien des Étudiants de Toulouse
- South-West : Stade Bordelais Université Club
- Littoral : Olympique de Marseille.

== Table of results ==
First round
FC Lyon	11
Stade grenoblois	0
Le Havre AC
Vélo Sport Chartrain	forf.

Quarter-finals
FC Lyon	5
Olympique de Marseille	4
Racing club de France	31
Le Havre AC	11

Semi-finals
FC Lyon	forf.
Racing club de France
3 June – Rome
Stade Bordelais
SOE Toulouse

Final
22 April – Levallois-Perret
Racing club de France	37
Stade Bordelais	3
Third place

== Final ==
Teams	Racing club de France – SBUC
Score	37–3
Date	22 April 1900
Venue	Levallois-Perret
Referee	Camille Berthommé
Line-up
Racing Club de France	Alexandre Pharamond, Goudard, Cyril Rutherford, Jean Collas, Frantz Reichel, Charles Gondouin, Léon Binoche, Paul Muret, Wladimir Aïtoff, André Roosevelt, Hubert Lefèbvre, Emile Sarrade, Etienne Lesage, Bell, R. Erzbischoff
SBUC	Jean Guiraut, Pascal Laporte, W.C. Campbell, Campbell Cartwright, Louis Soulé, Mazières, Paul Lauga, Carlos, Charles Lauga, Carlos Deltour, Pierre Terrigi, Henri Houssemont, Marcel Laffitte, Georges Marx, Williamson. Prelacement : Roger Saint-Bonnet
Scorers
Racing Club de France	9 tries Bondouin (3), Sarrade (2), Lesage, Rutherford, Goudard, Reichel, 5 conversions by Rutherford
SBUC	1 try by Laporte
