= Football at the 1896 Summer Olympics =

Tournament details
- Host country: Greece
- City: Athens
- Dates: 12 April 1896
- Teams: 2
- Venue: 1 (in 1 host city)

Final positions
- Champions: Denmark XI
- Runners-up: (Greece) Podilatikos Syllogos Athinon

Tournament statistics
- Matches played: 1
- Goals scored: 15 (15 per match)

At the 1896 Summer Olympics in Athens, an unofficial football event was held on 12 April between two representative teams of Greece and Denmark at the Podilatodromio. The International Olympic Committee (IOC) does not recognize the existence of an official football tournament at the 1896 Olympics and the majority of works devoted to the 1896 Olympic Games do not actually mention a football competition; however, there is incontrovertible evidence that the aforementioned match was played as either a part of the (unofficial) programme, or as a "demonstration sport" during the Olympic Games.

The reason why this match was more or less ignored was because of a recommendation from Crown Prince Constantine, the chairman of the 1896 Olympic Organizing Committee, who publicly said that the sports which were not part of the official Olympic programme should not be mentioned, and thus, due to its unofficial classification, the football match was forbidden to be reported anywhere, neither by the local or the national press. As a result, the final score of the game remains uncertain with various sources agreeing it was either a 9–0 or a 15–0 victory for the Danish, who were later awarded bronze medals by the local organizing committee. Prince Constantine's younger brother, George, Prince of both Greece and Denmark, refereed the football match.

== Background ==
The organisation of a football tournament at the 1896 Games was directly raised during the first-ever IOC meeting held in November 1894, which means that an Olympic football tournament was originally planned to be held at the Games. By early 1896, the Greek Olympic Organising Committee had been informed that four foreign football teams were interested in sending a team, and thus, on 17 March, it was decided to include football in the official programme of the 1896 Games. However, none of the four clubs showed up in Athens, and thus, despite the Greek preparations for a football tournament, it was ultimately decided to remove football from the official Olympic programme due to the small number of participants on 28 March, in a meeting of the Greek organising committee.

The deadline for both federations and clubs to sign up was six days later (3 April). By that day the Secretary-General had only received name lists from Greece and Denmark. Football was thus (like boxing, cricket, horse racing, rowing and sailing) only unofficially part of the Olympic programme in Athens in 1896.

== Squad ==
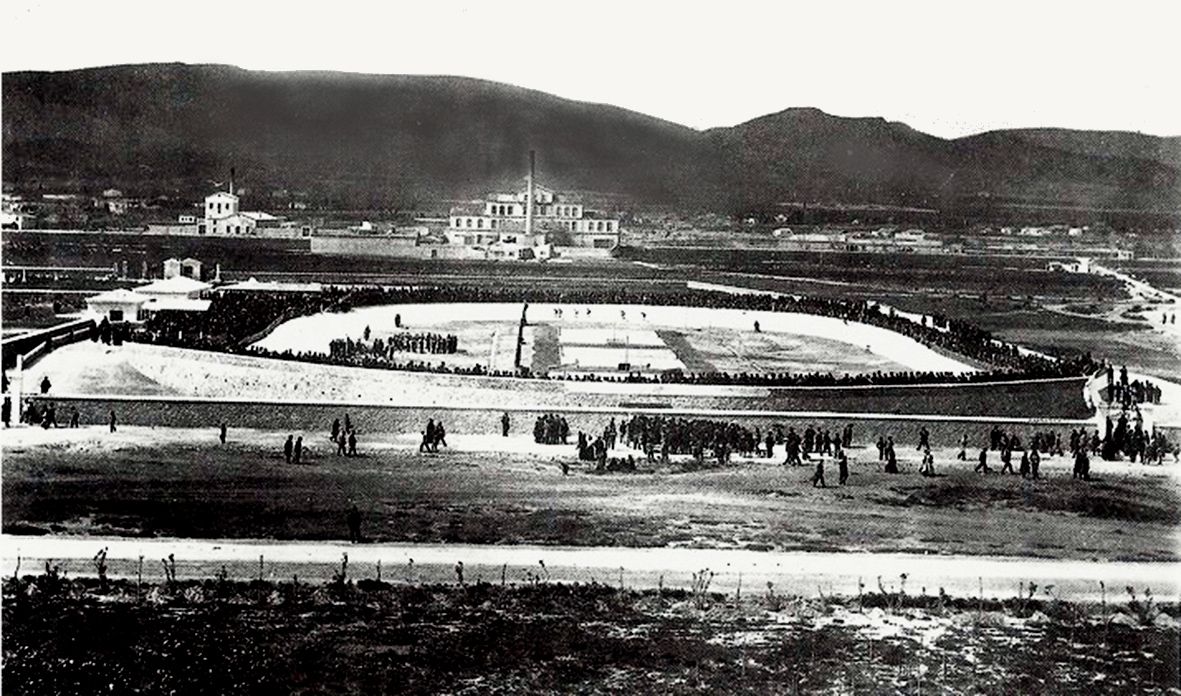
The "Podilatodromio" in Athens, venue for the tournament, as seen in 1896

The Greek team was represented by the Podilatikos Syllogos Athinón (Ποδηλατικός Σύλλογος Αθηνών,lit. 'Athens Cycling Association', one of the pioneers of Greek football), who also represented Greece at the track cycling competitions which were conducted at the Neo Phaliron Velodrome. The Danish team, however, was much harder to put together. Københavns Roklub (KR) had a good football team in the 1890s, so they received an invitation from the founder of the modern Olympic Games, Pierre de Coubertin, to participate in the 1896 Olympics, but apparently, they sent just two players to represent them, Eugen Schmidt and Holger Nielsen, who filled the rest of team with Danes who lived in Athens or who just happened to be there at the time for work reasons, such as sailors and businessmen, along with some members of Østerbro Boldklub (ØB). KR and ØB had been among the founding members of the Dansk Idræts-Forbund (DIF, Danish Sports Confederation), founded on 14 February 1896, which selected the team sent to Athens. The ØB players who were sent to Athens were replaced by the ones who had left Boldklubben Frem, apparently for economic reasons.

Czech author Jiří Guth-Jarkovský, who was one of the founding members of the IOC in 1894 and was in Athens in 1896 as an IOC member, reported in 1896 that Denmark had 12 participants at the Olympic Games, which explains how Denmark could field a whole football team. Later reports state that Denmark only had 3 participants, but the 9 additional participants were most likely only part of the unofficial football match, and therefore they were never listed in official sources.

Both Schmidt and Nielsen competed in other events at the 1896 Summer Olympics, with Schmidt competing in both the 100 metre sprint, and the military rifle shooting event, although he did not achieve any notable feats. Nielsen competed in fencing, firearms and discus events.

== Venue ==
The match attracted 6,000 spectators, and was hosted at the "Neo Phaliron Velodrome" (or "Podilatodromio"), originally a velodrome and sports arena in the Neo Faliro District of Piraeus. This venue was also used for the track cycling events at the 1896 Olympics.

== The match ==
12 April 1896
15:40

Podilatikos Syllogos Athinon (Greece)	0–9 or 0–15	Denmark XI
	Report

Podilatodromio, Athens, Greece
Attendance: 6,000
Referee: Prince George (Greece)

GK	(Greece) Pavlos Kountouriotis
DF	(Greece) Kavalieratos Anninos
DF	(Greece) Konstantinos Zervoudakis
MF	(Greece) Demetrios Petrokokkinos
MF	(Greece) Georgios Karamanos
MF	(Greece) Stavros Antoniadis
FW	(Greece) Spyridon Angonakis
FW	(Greece) P. Gasparis
FW	(Greece) Epamaindos Harilaos
FW	(Greece) Stamatios Nikolopoulos
FW	(Greece) Eleftherios Psaroudas

(Denmark) Eugen Schmidt
(Denmark) Holger Nielsen
+ 9 unknown players (Danish sailors and businessmen, members of the Østerbro Boldklub, who happened to be in Athens)

== Tournament ranking ==
Pos.	Team	Pld	W	D	L
1	Denmark XI (DEN)	1	1	0	0
2	(Greece) Podilatikos Syllogos Athinon (GRE)	1	0	0	1

== Disputes and proof ==
=== Disputes ===
In 2017, Olympic historians Volker Kluge and Bill Mallon published the results of an investigation into a possible football game at the 1896 Olympic Games. They cite a book (published in 1998) about the 1896 Olympic Games written by Bill Mallon himself and Ture Widlund. In the book, they concluded that:

"Football is sometimes listed as having been contested in 1896 as an exhibition sport or demonstration sport at the Olympic Games, although no such designation existed at the time of the 1896 Olympics. Supposedly, a match between a Greek club and a Danish club was conducted. No 1896 source supports this and we think this is most likely an error that has been perpetrated in multiple texts. No such match occurred."

The theory that Mallon and Kluge put forward is that the match between Denmark and Athens at the 1906 Intercalated Games has, in the course of history, been wrongly reported as happening at the 1896 Olympic Games. In fact, one source dictates that the 1896 match was contested by an Athens XI and a Smyrna XI, but this game actually took place at the Intercalated Games and is alleged to be a mistake that has persisted through time.

=== Proof ===
Olympic historians Erik Bergvall, Fritz Wasner, Herbert Sander and Peder Christian Andersen all independently agree that football was played at the 1896 Olympic Games, and that there can be no question of a confusion between the football tournaments played in 1896 and 1906.

In 1970, an old Greek footballer Malonis Isaias, who also played at the 1919 Inter-Allied Games, gave an interview about the beginning of Greek football, in which he stated that football was played at the 1896 Olympic Games.

The information about the match most likely comes mostly from one of the founders of the IOC Aleksei Butovsky (1838–1917), who was a witness to the match in 1896. According to him the score was 0–9.

FIFA News number 155 from April 1976 lists Denmark as the first Olympic champions. Later that year in July, FIFA held its 40th congress, which officially recognised the 1896 Olympic Games as the first Olympic football tournament.
