= Københavns Roklub =

Danish rowing club

- Location: Copenhagen, Denmark
- Founded: 20 October 1866
- Membership: Port of Copenhagen
- Affiliations: Danish National Rowing Federation
- Website: www.koebenhavnsroklub.dk

Københavns Roklub (English: Copenhagen Rowing Club) is a rowing club based in Copenhagen, Denmark. Founded in 1866, it is the second oldest rowing club in the country.

== History ==
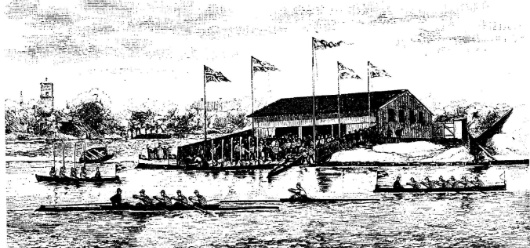
Københavns Roklub at the Timber Dock in 1994

The club was founded as Handels- og kontoristforeningens Roklub on 20 October 1866, just one month after Denmark's first rowing club, Roforeningen KVIK (22 September 1866), under the leadership of etatsråd Harald Fritsche. Its first boathouse was located at Applebys Plads in Christianshavn. Its first boat, Tak (literally 'Thanks'), was sponsored by Ole Berendt Suhr. The club changed its name to Københavns Roklub (KR) in 1880.

In 1883, KR founded Den Skandinaviske Kaproning in collaboration with Christiania Roklub in Oslo and Stockholm Roddförening in Stockholm. A new boathouse was inaugurated on the other side of the harbour in 1884. It was located at the Timber Dock (Tømmergraven), approximately where Copenhagen Police Headquarters is today. In 1887, KR co-founded the Danish Rowing Federation (Dansk Forening for Rosport). In 1891, KR established an athletics club, whose name was later changed to Københavns Fodsports Forening and then Københavns Idræts Forening. In 1896, KR co-founded the Dansk Idræts Forbund (DIF). The club's president, Eugen Schmidt, became DIF's first president. Three KR members, Edgar Aabye, Eugen Schmidt and Charles Winckler won gold in tug of war at the 1900 Summer Olympics, participating on a mixed team alongside three Swedish athletes. KR's flag was introduced for the event.

In 1902, KR inaugurated a new boathouse at Djævleøen (Devil's Isle) in the South Harbour, now Kalvebod Brygge. The club's current boathouse was inaugurated in connection with its 75th anniversary in 1941 at an event attended by King Christian and crown prince Frederik. The boathouse was confiscated by the German occupying forces in 1944 but was returned to the club at the end of the war in 1945. In 1975, KR was opened to female members. In 2004, the club sold its premises in Mosede to raise funds for an expansion of the headquarters in Copenhagen.

== Location ==
=== Copenhagen ===
Københavns Roklub is based at Tømmergravsgade 13 in the Enghave Brygge area of Copenhagen's South Harbour. The club's boathouse is from 1941. The club house was most recently renovated in 2009. It is located next to Tømmergraven, the canal that separates the northern end of Enghave Brygge from Havneholmen. Frederiks Brygge, a new residential development, is also under construction at the site.

=== Holbæk Fjord ===
The club also has a summer camp, Hammer-Ro, located on the Hammergården estate at Holbæk Fjord. It was inaugurated in 2006 as a replacement for an earlier summer camp at Mosede which was sold in 2004. The Mosede site was acquired in 1945. The first house was built on the land in 1856 and replaced by a new one in 1967.

== Current activities ==
Københavns Roklub regularly competes across Denmark at all levels and has a broad membership base, from complete novices and juniors through to senior oarsmen and veterans. The club has some 300 members.

== Competitions ==
Københavns Roklub hosts Port of Copenhagen, part of DFfR's long-distance tournament. It was introduced in 1981. The Dragon Boat Regatta was first hosted in 1993.
