= Binoche =

Binoche (pronounced [binɔʃ]) is a French last name from Yonne and Loiret, derived from a diminutive of Robin, itself a diminutive of Robert. Notable people with the surname include:

- Léon Binoche (1878–1962), French international rugby union player
- Juliette Binoche (born 1964), French Academy Award-winning actress

== See also ==
- 19998 Binoche, a minor planet
