= Cyril Rutherford =

French rugby union player (1873–1951)

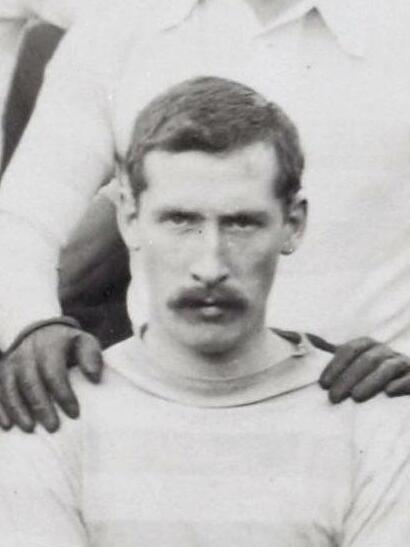
- Rutherford in 1899
- Born: 20 August 1873 Pulborough, West Sussex, England
- Died: 9 April 1951 (aged 77) 5th arrondissement of Paris, France

Rugby union career
Senior career
Years	Team	Apps	(Points)
1898–1904	Racing Club		

Cyril Rutherford (20 August 1873 – 9 April 1951) was a French rugby union player of Scottish origin who played as a three-quarter for Racing Club at the turn of the century, becoming one of the most important and influential figures in the early development of French rugby. He was also a rugby football referee, overseeing a national French final in 1905 and an international match with France in 1908.

== Sporting career ==
Born on 20 August 1873 in Pulborough, West Sussex, Rutherford was 22 when he arrived in France, joining the ranks of Racing Club in the late 1890s, where he played a pivotal role, together with Alexandre Pharamond, Frantz Reichel, and Léon Binoche, in helping Racing win the 1899–1900 French Rugby Union Championship, scoring a try and five conversions in a 37–3 victory over Stade Bordelais in the final on 22 April at Levallois-Perret. Following the retirement of both Pharamond and Reichel, he became the team's captain, leading his side to another French Rugby Union Championship in 1901–02, beating the same opponents 6–0 in the final on 23 March at the Parc des Princes. In December 1899, he started for Racing in a match against London Irish FC.

In 1904, Rutherford retired from playing to devote himself to refereeing, and within just a year, he was entrusted with the 1905 final despite his lack of experience. He also served as the international secretary of the USFSA, from which he organized the French national team's matches abroad. On 1 January 1908, he refereed an international match between France and England, which ended in a 19–0 win for the English. On 19 January 1919, the 46-year-old Rutherford refereed an unofficial international meeting between France and Australia at the Parc des Princes, and a few months later, he oversaw a "Cup of Hope" between Tarbes and Bayonne. He was also a touch judge not only in France's first-ever match on 1 January 1906, but also in the 1924 Olympic final between France and the USA in Paris.

Three years later, in February 1927, Rutherford, then secretary of the French Rugby Federation, accompanied once again the French team to the other side of the English Channel He was later knighted into the Legion of Honour.

== Later life and death ==
Outside sports, Rutherford worked as a fabric merchant. He died in the 5th arrondissement of Paris on 9 April 1951, at the age of 77. Following his death, the French Rugby Federation organized a consolation event called Coupe Cyril Rutherford in his honor.

== Honours ==
Stade Français

- French Rugby Union Championship:
  - Champions (2): 1899–1900, 1901–02
