= Colombia at the 1900 Summer Olympics =

- IOC code: COL
- NOC: Colombian Olympic Committee
- Website: www.olimpicocol.co (in Spanish)

in Paris
- Competitors: 1 in 1 sport
- Medals: Gold 0 Silver 0 Bronze 0 Total 0

Summer Olympics appearances (overview)
- 1932; 1936; 1948; 1952; 1956; 1960; 1964; 1968; 1972; 1976; 1980; 1984; 1988; 1992; 1996; 2000; 2004; 2008; 2012; 2016; 2020; 2024

Colombia did not send a team to the 1900 Summer Olympics in Paris, France. However, the French-born Colombian Francisco Henríquez de Zubiría represented France in the mixed team Tug of war at the 1900 Summer Olympics tournament and won a silver medal.

== Medalist - member of Mixed team ==
Medal	Name	Sport	Event	Date
Silver	Francisco Henríquez de Zubiría	Tug of war	Men's tournament	July 16
