= Holger Nielsen =

Danish sportsman (1866–1954)

Olympic medal record

Representing Denmark

Men's Fencing
Bronze medal – third place	1896 Athens	Sabre

Men's Shooting
Silver medal – second place	1896 Athens	Free pistol
Bronze medal – third place	1896 Athens	25 metre rapid fire pistol

Holger Louis Nielsen (18 December 1866 – 26 January 1955) was a Danish fencer, sport shooter, and athlete. He competed at the 1896 Summer Olympics in Athens. He is probably best known for drawing up the first set of rules for the game of handball.

== Fencing ==
Nielsen's main sport was fencing, in which he competed in the sabre. At Athens, Nielsen placed third in the sabre event. He split his matches in the five-man, round-robin tournament. Nielsen defeated Adolf Schmal and Georgios Iatridis, but lost to Telemachos Karakalos and Ioannis Georgiadis. This 2–2 record put Nielsen in third place.

== Firearms competitions ==
In the military rifle event, Nielsen quit the competition after the first day. He had shot 20 times out of the full 40, though his score was unknown. Nielsen placed fifth in the military pistol event. He won a bronze medal in the rapid fire pistol, coming in last of the three shooters that finished the competition. His best result of the Games was a surprise silver medal in the free pistol competition; his score of 285 was far behind Sumner Paine's 442 but was sufficient to defeat the other three shooters in the event. His scores for each of the five strings of 6 shots were 12, 85, 62, 24, and 100.

== Discus ==
Nielsen also competed in the discus throw. He did not place among the top four in the event, though records are unclear as to which place between fifth and last (ninth) he received.

== Football ==
Together with fellow Københavns Roklub athlete Eugen Schmidt, Nielsen also participated in the unofficial football event in which a Danish XI faced a Greek team as a "demonstration sport", and it was the Danes who came-out as the winners by either 9–0 or 15–0.

== Other activities ==
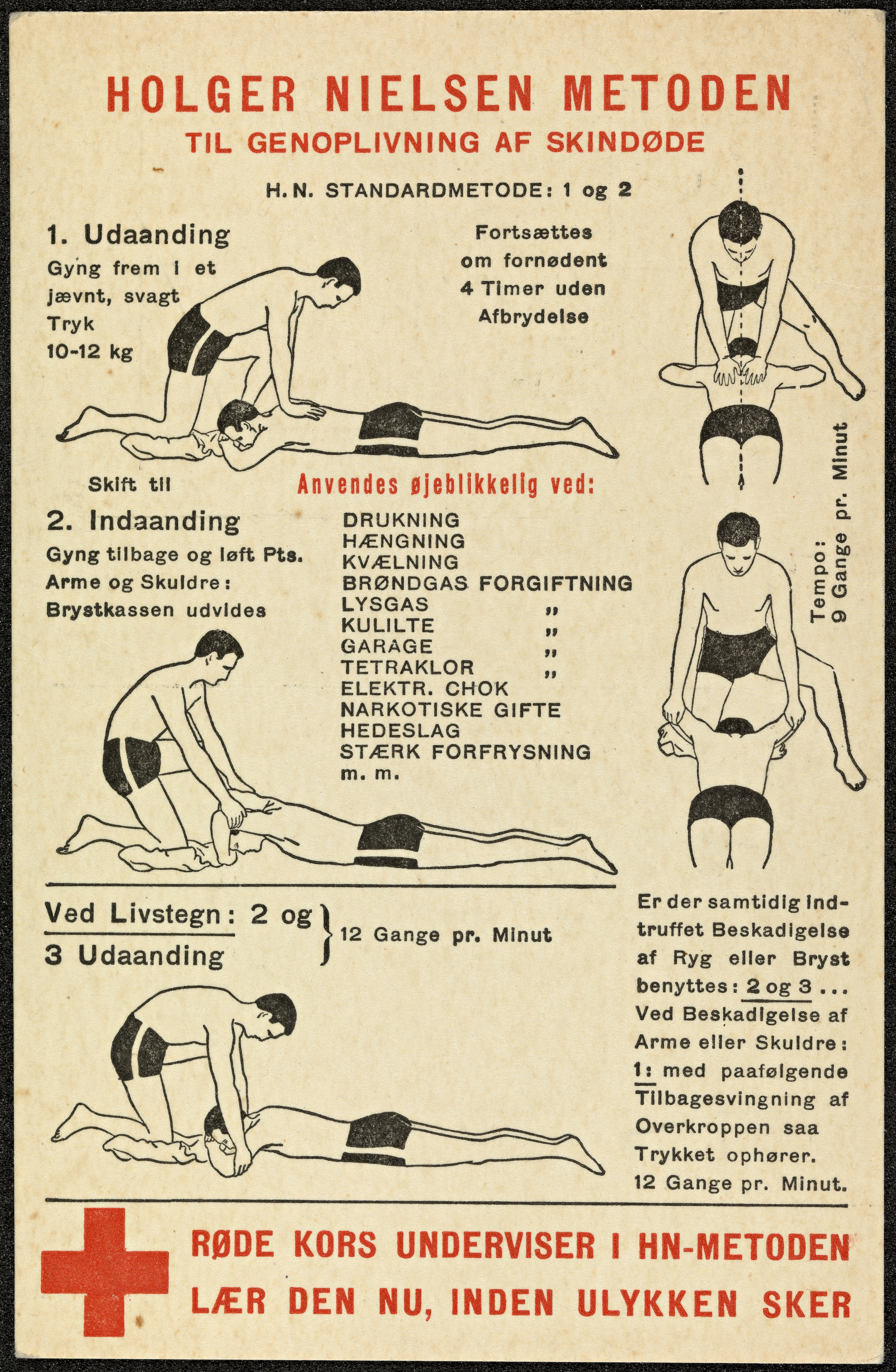
Illustration of the Holger Nielsen method

Nielsen is also credited with developing an early set of rules for handball in 1898, and with developing a form of external cardiopulmonary resuscitation called the Holger Nielsen method in 1932. The National Research Council gave support to this method in 1951, however, it was superseded by mouth-to-mouth resuscitation in recommendations of 1958. (Artificial Respiration, the history of an idea. A B Baker Med Hist. 1971 15(4): 336-351)
