= Athletics at the 1900 Summer Olympics – Men's discus throw =

Men's discus throw at the Games of the II Olympiad
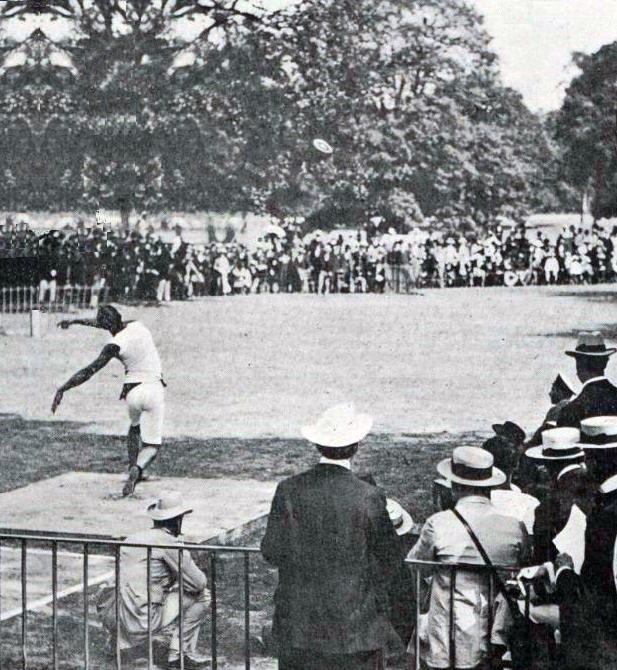
- Rudolf Bauer
- Venue: Bois de Boulogne
- Dates: July 14, 1900 (qualifier); July 15, 1900 (final)
- Competitors: 17 from 9 nations
- Winning distance: 36.04 OR

Medalists
1st place, gold medalist(s)		Rudolf Bauer; Hungary
2nd place, silver medalist(s)		František Janda-Suk; Bohemia
3rd place, bronze medalist(s)		Richard Sheldon; United States

The men's discus throw was a track & field athletics event at the 1900 Summer Olympics in Paris. It was held on July 14 and July 15, 1900. 17 discus throwers from nine nations competed. The event was won by Rudolf Bauer of Hungary, the nation's first victory in the men's discus throw (in its first appearance in the event). František Janda-Suk gave Bohemia its first medal in the event, also in that nation's first appearance. Richard Sheldon's bronze put the United States in the top three for the second consecutive Games.

== Background ==
This was the second appearance of the event, which is one of 12 athletics events to have been held at every Summer Olympics. The top two men from 1896, Robert Garrett of the United States and Panagiotis Paraskevopoulos of Greece, returned to competition. The third-place man, Sotirios Versis of Greece, was entered but did not start.

Austria, Bohemia, and Hungary each made their debut in the men's discus throw. All six of the nations that competed in 1896 returned in 1900: Denmark, France, Great Britain, Greece, Sweden, and the United States.

== Competition format ==
There event was described as having two rounds, but was more similar to the modern divided final (with first "round" results carried over). The format of the competition is unclear; it appears that each thrower received three throws and the finalists received three more. The top five throwers in the qualifying round qualified for the final. The throwing area was a 2.50 metre square instead of a circle. The landing area was unusually narrow ("basically a lane through two rows of trees"), causing difficulties in making legal throws.

== Records ==
These were the standing world and Olympic records (in metres) prior to the 1900 Summer Olympics.

World record	Gustaf Söderström (SWE)	38.70^{*}	Stockholm, Sweden	18 September 1897
Olympic record	Robert Garrett (USA)	29.15	Athens, Greece	6 April 1896 (NS)

^{*} unofficial

With the world now familiar with the discus, the Olympic record of 1896 was not a meaningful distance; every thrower who made a legal mark surpassed that distance. Rudolf Bauer set a new Olympic record with 36.04 metres.

== Schedule ==
Date	Time	Round
Saturday, 14 July 1900	9:45	Qualifying
Sunday, 15 July 1900	15:15	Final

== Results ==
All throwers competed in the qualifying round, with the top five moving on to the final. The defending champion, Garrett, kept hitting the trees with his discus, and did not achieve a legal mark. The top five throwers received additional throws on the second day. No positions changed during the final, despite the leader not being able to improve upon his qualifying marks. Throw sequences are not known. Von Lubowiecki missed the qualifying round but was permitted to throw on the second day; he did not achieve a top-five result.

Rank	Athlete	Nation	Qualifying	Final	Distance	Notes
1st place, gold medalist(s)	Rudolf Bauer	Hungary	36.04 OR	Unknown	36.04	OR
2nd place, silver medalist(s)	František Janda-Suk	Bohemia	35.04	35.14	35.14	
3rd place, bronze medalist(s)	Richard Sheldon	United States	34.10	34.60	34.60	
4	Panagiotis Paraskevopoulos	Greece	34.04	34.50	34.50	
5	Rezső Crettier	Hungary	33.65	Unknown	33.65	
6	Gustaf Söderström	Sweden	33.07	Did not advance	33.07	
7	John Flanagan	United States	33.00	Did not advance	33.00	
8	Eric Lemming	Sweden	32.50	Did not advance	32.50	
8	Charles Winckler	Denmark	32.50	Did not advance	32.50	
10	Josiah McCracken	United States	32.00	Did not advance	32.00	
11	Artúr Coray	Hungary	31.00	Did not advance	31.00	
11	Launceston Elliot	Great Britain	31.00	Did not advance	31.00	
13	Émile Gontier	France	30.00	Did not advance	30.00	
14	Gyula Strausz	Hungary	29.80	Did not advance	29.80	
—	Cornelius von Lubowiecki	Austria	Unknown	Did not advance	Unknown	
—	Robert Garrett	United States	No mark	Did not advance	No mark	
—	Truxtun Hare	United States	No mark	Did not advance	No mark	
—	André Roosevelt	United States	DNS			
—	Karl Staaf	Sweden	DNS			
—	Sotirios Versis	Greece	DNS			

== Sources ==
- International Olympic Committee.
- De Wael, Herman. Herman's Full Olympians: "Athletics 1900". Accessed 18 March 2006. Available electronically at.
- Mallon, Bill (1998). The 1900 Olympic Games, Results for All Competitors in All Events, with Commentary. Jefferson, North Carolina: McFarland & Company, Inc., Publishers. ISBN 0-7864-0378-0.
