= Abel Albert =

French rugby union player

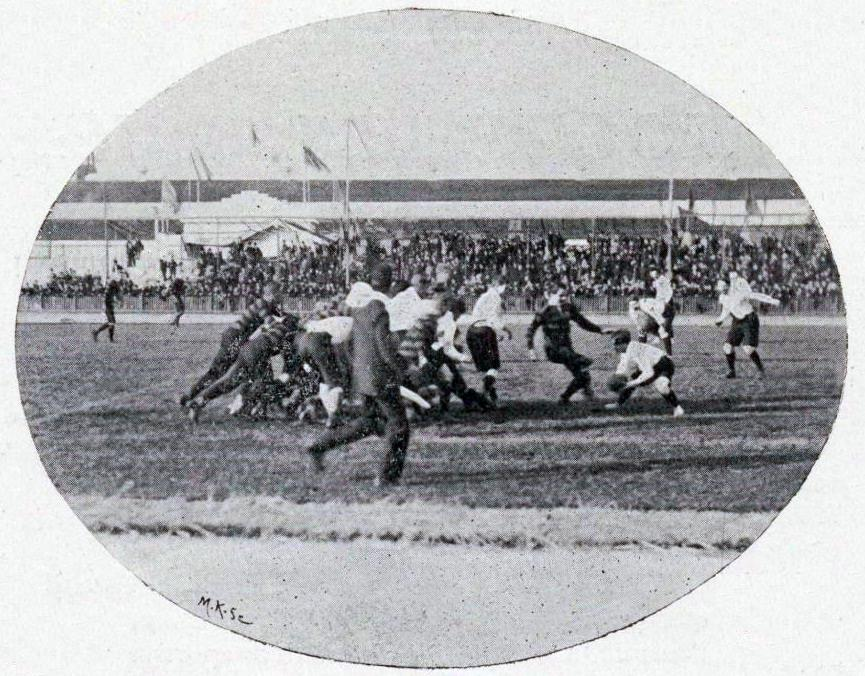
- Albert receives the ball after the scrum during the France-Germany match
- Born: 31 January 1873 6th arrondissement of Paris, France
- Died: 27 September 1919 (aged 46) 4th arrondissement of Paris, France

Rugby union career
Senior career
Years	Team	Apps	(Points)
1900	Cosmopolitan Club		
National sevens team
Years	Team		Comps
1900	France national rugby union team		1 (1)
Medal record
Men's rugby union
Representing France
Football at the Summer Olympics
Gold medal – first place	1900 Paris	Team competition

Abel Albert (31 January 1873 – 27 September 1919) was a French rugby union player who competed in the rugby event of the 1900 Summer Olympics in Paris, being a member of the French rugby team that won the gold medal.

== Early life ==
Abel Albert was born in the 6th arrondissement of Paris on 31 January 1873.

== Sporting career ==
Albert began his sporting career at Cosmopolitan Club, where he played as a halfback. Together with Frantz Reichel, André Roosevelt, and Jean-Guy Gautier, he was a member of the French team that competed in the rugby event at the 1900 Summer Olympics in Paris. Albert and Cosmopolitan teammate André Rischmann were the only players of the French team who were not members of either Racing Club de France and Stade Français.

On 14 October, he was among the 17 who aligned against Frankfurt (representing Germany), starting as a midfielder alongside Léon Binoche, and even though they were not used to play together, which was an enormous advantage for the Frankfurt midfielders, they were able to help their side to a 27–17 victory. For the decisive match against Moseley Wanderers (representing Great Britain) on 28 October, Henriquez de Zubiera and Albert were replaced by Giroux (SF) and Gondouin (RCF), as France won gold medal with a 27–8 victory.

== Death ==
Albert died in the 4th arrondissement of Paris on 27 September 1919, at the age of 46.

== Honours ==
France

- Summer Olympics:
  - Gold medal (1): 1900
