= Rudolf Bauer (athlete) =

Hungarian discus thrower

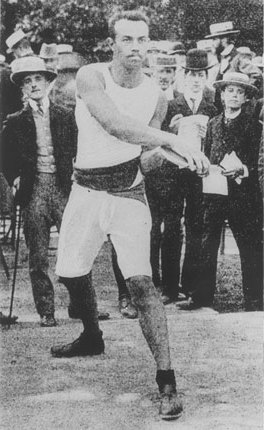

Medal record

Men's athletics

Representing Hungary

Olympic Games
Gold medal – first place	1900 Paris	Discus throw

Rezső Ignác Boldizsár "Rudolf" Bauer (2 January 1879 in Budapest – 9 November 1932 in Sósér, now part of the village Dunatetétlen) was a Hungarian athlete and the winner of the gold medal in the men's discus throw at the 1900 Summer Olympics. He won with 36.04 metres, a new Olympic record.
