= Robert Fournier-Sarlovèze =

French politician and polo player

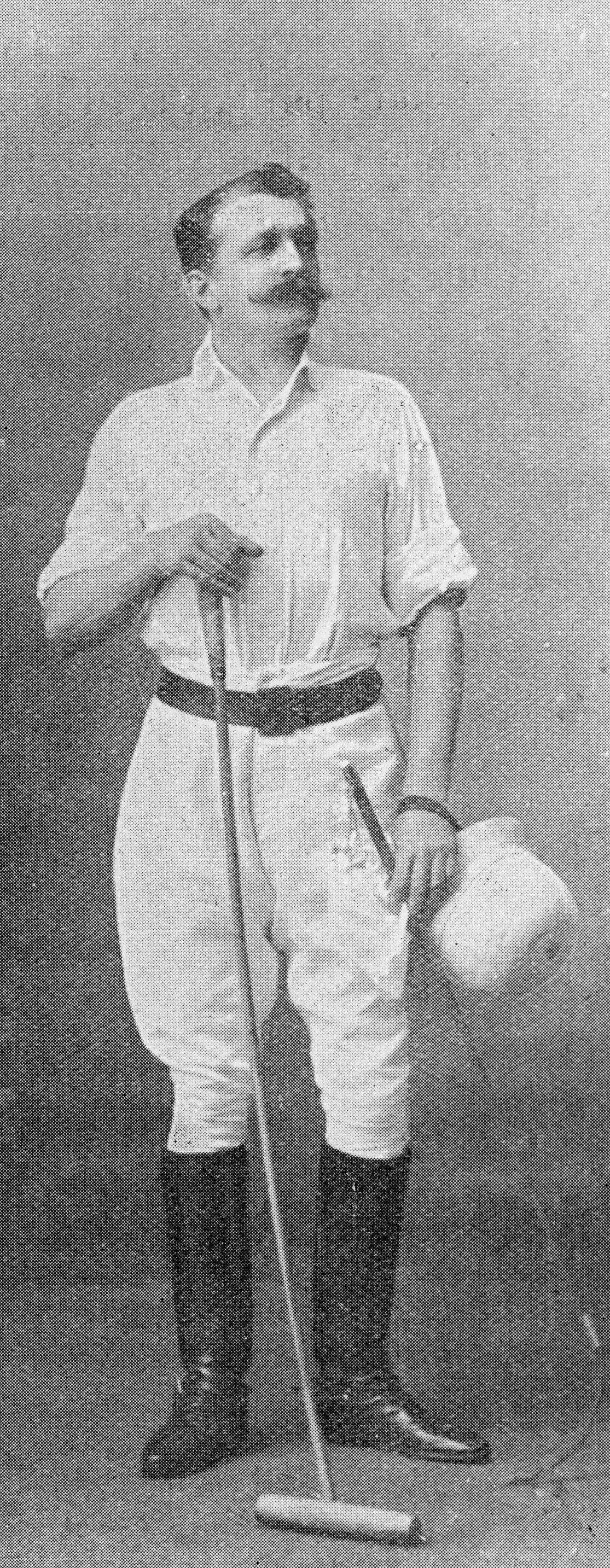
- Robert Fournier-Sarlovèze

Personal information
- Born: 14 January 1869 Paris, France
- Died: 13 July 1937 (aged 68) Compiègne, France

Sport
- Sport: Polo
- Club: Bagatelle Polo Club de Paris
Medal record
Men's polo
Representing a Mixed team
| Bronze medal – third place | 1900 Paris | Team competition |

Mortimer Henri-Robert Fournier-Sarlovèze (January 14, 1869 – July 13, 1937) was a French politician and polo player in the 1900 Summer Olympics. He was born in Paris and died in Compiègne. In 1900 he was part of the Bagatelle Polo Club de Paris polo team which won the bronze medal.
