= Postřižín =

- Municipality
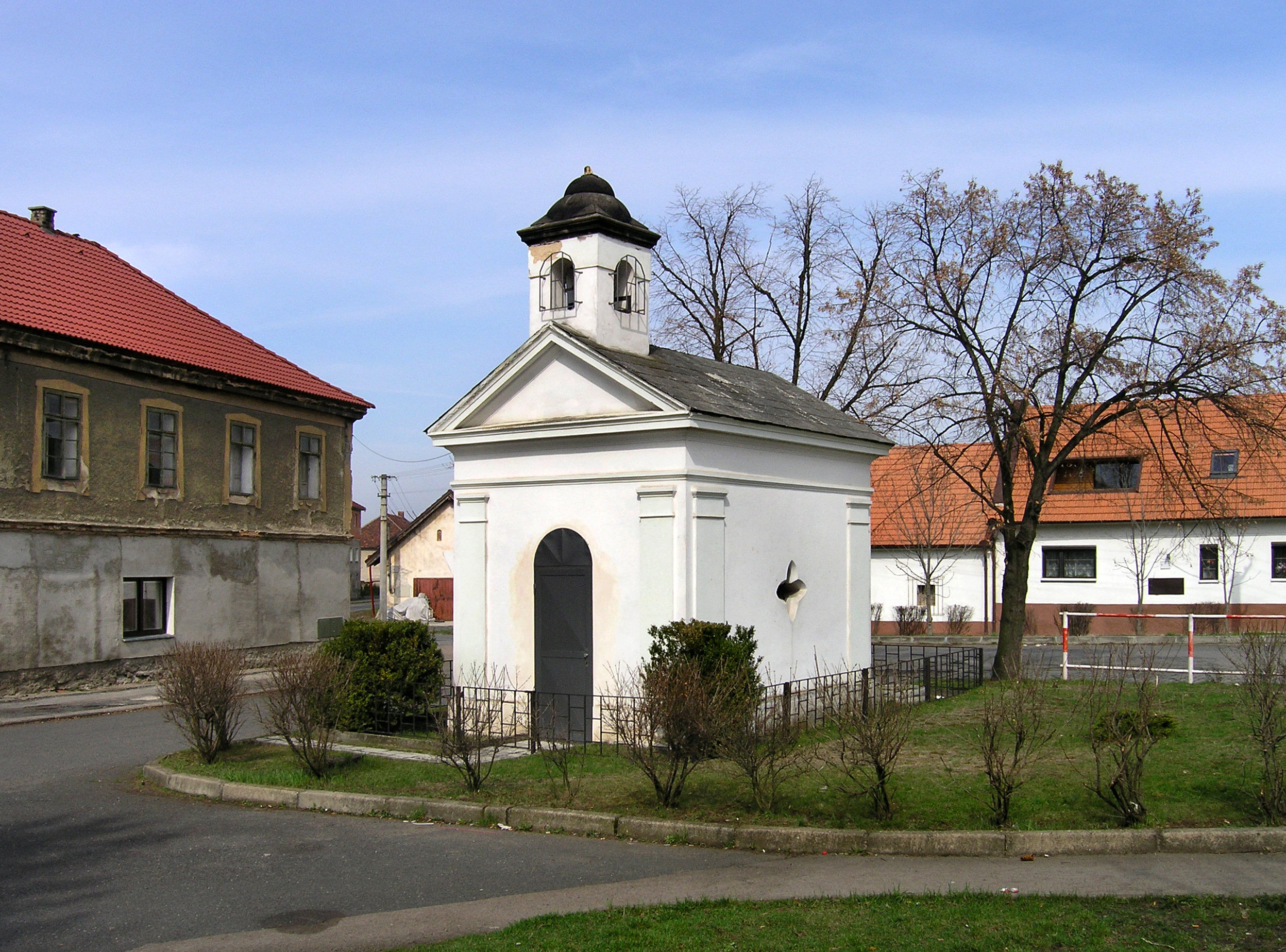
- Chapel in the centre of Postřižín

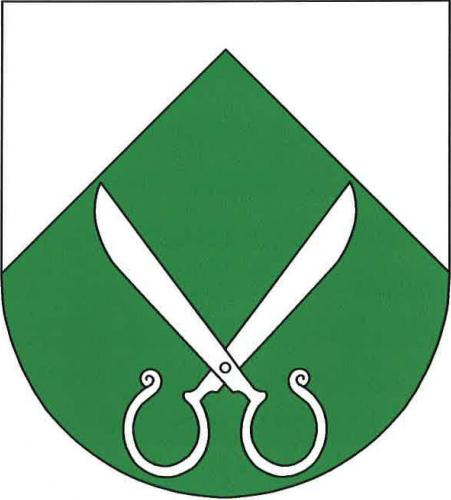
- Flag Coat of arms

- Location in the Czech Republic
- Coordinates: 50°13′59″N 14°23′12″E
- Country: Czech Republic
- Region: Central Bohemian
- District: Mělník
- First mentioned: 1052

Area
  - Total: 4.43 km^{2} (1.71 sq mi)
- Elevation: 228 m (748 ft)

Population (2026-01-01)
  - Total: 2,033
  - Density: 459/km^{2} (1,190/sq mi)
- Time zone: UTC+1 (CET)
  - Summer (DST): UTC+2 (CEST)
- Postal code: 250 70
- Website: www.obecpostrizin.cz

Postřižín is a municipality and village in Mělník District in the Central Bohemian Region of the Czech Republic. It has about 2,000 inhabitants.

== Etymology ==
The name is probably derived from the personal name Postřiha, meaning "Postřiha's".

== Geography ==
Postřižín is located about 13 kilometres (8 mi) north of Prague. It lies in an agricultural landscape, on the border between the Central Elbe Table and Prague Plateau. The highest point is at 274 m (899 ft) above sea level.

== History ==
The first written mention of Postřižín is in a deed of Duke Bretislav I from 1052.

== Demographics ==
Historical population

Year	Pop.	±%
1869	333	—
1880	390	+17.1%
1890	381	−2.3%
1900	388	+1.8%
1910	388	+0.0%

Year	Pop.	±%
1921	369	−4.9%
1930	415	+12.5%
1950	364	−12.3%
1961	377	+3.6%
1970	373	−1.1%

Year	Pop.	±%
1980	410	+9.9%
1991	345	−15.9%
2001	316	−8.4%
2011	904	+186.1%
2021	1,817	+101.0%

Source: Censuses

== Transport ==
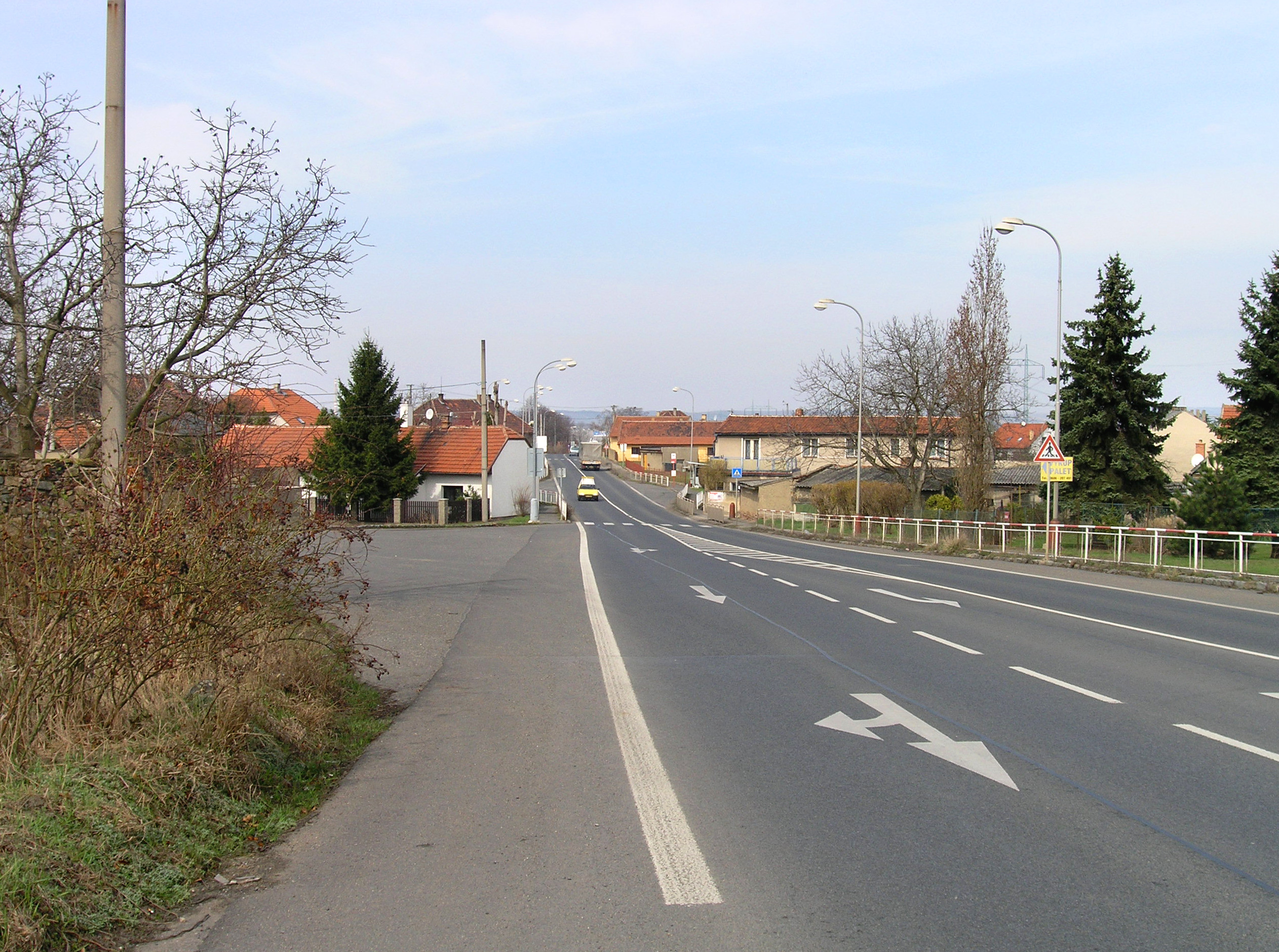
Main street

The D8 motorway from Prague to Ústí nad Labem runs through the municipality.

== Sights ==
There are no protected cultural monuments in the municipality. In the centre of Postřižín is a small chapel.

== Notable people ==
- František Janda-Suk (1878–1955), discus thrower, the first Czech Olympic medalist
