= Frédéric Blanchy =

French sailor (1868–1944)

Personal information
- Full name: Gaston Frédéric Blanchy
- Born: 1 July 1868 Bordeaux, France
- Died: 1 October 1944 (aged 76) Bordeaux, France

Sailing career
- Sport: Sailing
- Club: Cercle de la Voile d'Arcachon
- Class(es): 2 to 3 ton Open class
Medal record
Sailing
Representing Mixed team
Olympic Games
Gold medal – first place	1900 Paris	2 to 3 ton 1st race
Gold medal – first place	1900 Paris	2 to 3 ton 2nd race

Gaston Frédéric Blanchy (French pronunciation: [fʁedeʁik blɑ̃ʃi]; 1 July 1868 – 1 October 1944) was a French sailor who competed in the 1900 Summer Olympics. He was crew on the British/French boat Ollé, which won the gold medals in both races of the 2–3 ton class with fellow crew member Jacques Le Lavasseur and helmsman William Exshaw. He also participated in the open class, but did not finish.
