= Ferdinand Schlatter =

French sailor

Personal information
- Nationality: French

Sailing career
- Sport: Sailing
- Club: Cercle de la voile de Paris; Yacht Club de France
- Class(es): 2 to 3 ton Open class
Medal record
Sailing
Representing France
Olympic Games
Bronze medal – third place	1900 Paris	2 — 3 ton 1st race

Ferdinand Schlatter was a French sailor who competed in the 1900 Summer Olympics.

He was the helmsman of the French boat Gwendoline 2, which won a bronze medal in the first race of the 2 to 3 ton class. He also participated in the Open class, but did not finish the race.
