= Sailing at the 1900 Summer Olympics – 2 to 3 ton =

2 to 3 Ton Sailing at the Games of the II Olympiad
- 2 - 3 Ton Class
- Venue: Meulan
- Date: First race: May 22, 1900; Second race: May 25, 1900
- Competitors: 11 (documented) from 2 nations
- Teams: 4

Medalists
1st place, gold medalist(s)		William Exshaw, Frédéric Blanchy, Jacques Le Lavasseur	France
1st place, gold medalist(s)		William Exshaw, Frédéric Blanchy, Jacques Le Lavasseur	France
2nd place, silver medalist(s)		Léon Susse, Jacques Doucet, Auguste Godinet, Henri Mialaret	France
2nd place, silver medalist(s)		Léon Susse, Jacques Doucet, Auguste Godinet, Henri Mialaret	France
3rd place, bronze medalist(s)		Ferdinand Schlatter, Gilbert de Cotignon, Émile Jean-Fontaine	France
3rd place, bronze medalist(s)		Auguste Donny	France

The 2 to 3 ton was a sailing event on the Sailing at the 1900 Summer Olympics program in Meulan. Four boats started during the two races in the 2 to 3 ton. Eleven sailors are documented, besides the France participants there was a Mixed country team from Great Britain and France. The races were held on 22 and 25 May 1900 on the river Seine.

== Race schedule ==
●	Meulan competition	●	Le Havre competition

1900	May								August					
1900	20 Sun	21 Mon	22 Tue	23 Wed	24 Thu	25 Fri	26 Sat	27 Thu	1 Fri	2 Sat	3 Sun	4 Mon	5 Tue	6 Wed
2 to 3 ton			●			●								
Total gold medals			1			1								

== Course area and course configuration ==
For the 2 to 3 ton the 19 kilometres (10 nmi) course in the Meulan course area was used.

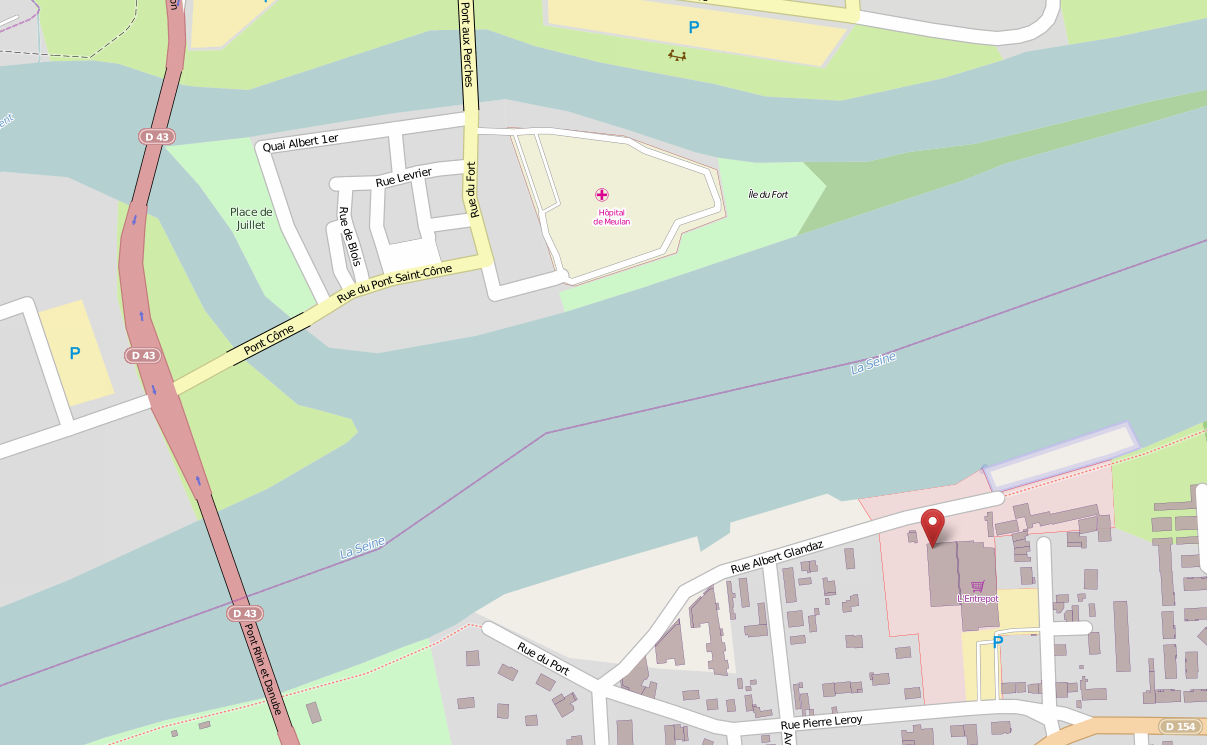
Course area Meulan

== Weather conditions ==
The race was troublesome due to an almost complete absence of any wind and the existing wind was perpendicular to the course (river Seine) and blocked or diverted by trees and buildings.

== Final results ==
Two separate races were sailed. No combined results were made.

=== Race of 22 May 1900 ===
Rank	Country	Helmsman	Crew	Boat	Medalrace	
Rank	Country	Helmsman	Crew	Boat	Pos.	Pts.
1st place, gold medalist(s)	France	William Exshaw GBR	Frédéric Blanchy FRA; Jacques Le Lavasseur FRA	Olly	1	02:17:30
2nd place, silver medalist(s)	France	Léon Susse	Jacques Doucet; Auguste Godinet; Henri Mialaret	Favorite	2	02:20:03
3rd place, bronze medalist(s)	France	Ferdinand Schlatter	Gilbert de Cotignon; Émile Jean-Fontaine	Gwendoline	3	02:24:48
4	France	Auguste Donny	Unknown	Mignon	4	02:26:31

Legend:
Gender: – male; – female;

=== Race of 25 May 1900 ===
Rank	Country	Helmsman	Crew	Boat	Medalrace	
Rank	Country	Helmsman	Crew	Boat	Pos.	Pts.
1st place, gold medalist(s)	France	William Exshaw GBR	Frédéric Blanchy FRA; Jacques Le Lavasseur FRA	Olly	1	04:17:34
2nd place, silver medalist(s)	France	Léon Susse	Jacques Doucet; Auguste Godinet; Henri Mialaret	Favorite	2	04:23:57
3rd place, bronze medalist(s)	France	Auguste Donny	Unknown	Mignon	4	04:52:13
	France	Ferdinand Schlatter	Gilbert de Cotignon; Émile Jean-Fontaine	Gwendoline	DNF	

Legend: DNF – Did not finish;
Gender: – male; – female;

== Notes ==
Mixed country teams during the 1900 Olympics are grouped together under the ZZX IOC code.

== Other information ==
Initially only the race on 22 May 1900 was part of the Olympic program. However the race on the 25 May 1900, initially part of the Exposition Universelle program, was afterwards awarded with an Olympic status.
