= William Exshaw =

British sailor (1866–1927)

Personal information
- Full name: William Edgar Exshaw
- Nationality: British
- Born: 15 February 1866 Arcachon, Second French Empire
- Died: 16 March 1927 (aged 61) Valencia, Spain

Sailing career
- Sport: Sailing
- Club: Société Nautique de Gironde
- Class(es): 2–3 ton Open class
Medal record
Sailing
Representing Mixed team
Olympic Games
Gold medal – first place	1900 Paris	2 to 3 ton 1st race
Gold medal – first place	1900 Paris	2 to 3 ton 2nd race

William Edgar Exshaw (15 February 1866 – 16 March 1927) was a British sailor who competed in the 1900 Summer Olympics.

He was the owner and helmsman of the British/French boat Ollé, which won the gold medals in both races of the 2-3 ton class with crew members Frédéric Blanchy and Jacques Le Lavasseur. He also participated in the open class, but did not finish.
