= Ioannis Georgiadis =

Greek fencer (1876–1960)

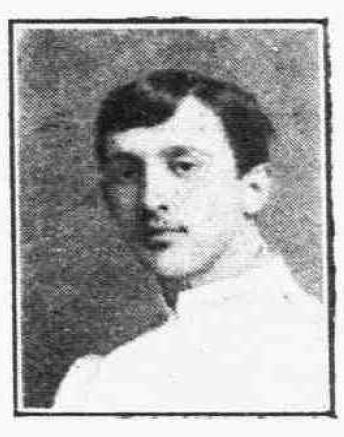
- Georgiadis in 1897

Personal information
- Born: 29 March 1876 Tripoli, Greece
- Died: 17 May 1960 (aged 84) Athens, Greece
Medal record
Men's fencing
Representing Greece
Olympic Games
Gold medal – first place	1896 Athens	Sabre
Intercalated Games
Gold medal – first place	1906 Athens	Sabre
Silver medal – second place	1906 Athens	Team Sabre

Ioannis Georgiadis (29 March 1876 – 17 May 1960) was a Greek fencer. He competed at the 1896 Summer Olympics in Athens, the 1906 Intercalated Olympics and the 1924 Summer Olympics in Paris.

In 1896 Georgiadis competed in the men's sabre event. In the five-man, round-robin tournament, Georgiadis won all four of his matches. He defeated Georgios Iatridis, Adolf Schmal, Telemachos Karakalos, and Holger Nielsen in succession to win first place.

Georgiadis later became Professor of Forensic Medicine and Toxicology at the Medical School of the National and Kapodistrian University of Athens.
