= Fencing at the 1896 Summer Olympics – Men's sabre =

Fencing at the Olympics

Men's sabre at the Games of the I Olympiad
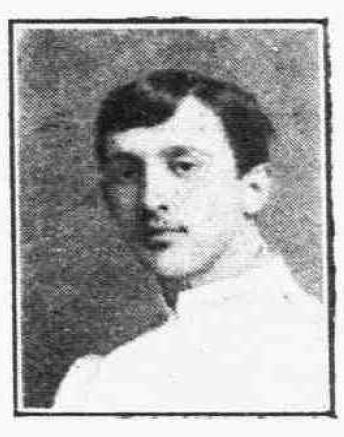
- Ioannis Georgiadis
- Venue: Zappeion
- Date: 9 April 1896
- Competitors: 5 from 3 nations

Medalists
1st place, gold medalist(s)		Ioannis Georgiadis	Greece
2nd place, silver medalist(s)		Telemachos Karakalos	Greece
3rd place, bronze medalist(s)		Holger Nielsen	Denmark

The men's sabre was one of three fencing events on the Fencing at the 1896 Summer Olympics programme. It was held on 9 April, the fourth day of competition. The event was won by Ioannis Georgiadis of Greece, with his countryman Telemachos Karakalos. Holger Nielsen of Denmark finished third.

== Background ==
This was the first appearance of the event, which is the only fencing event to have been held at every Summer Olympics. The five competitors were the Greeks Telemachos Karakalos, Ioannis Georgiadis, and Georgios Iatridis; the Dane Holger Nielsen; and the Austrian Adolf Schmal. The favorite was Schmal.

== Competition format ==
The event featured a pool-play final. Each bout was to three touches. Sabre rules were used, except that the target area was the entire body (rather than being limited to above the waist). The competition consisted of a single pool round of five fencers, with the pool fencing a round-robin. Thus, a total of ten matches were held and each fencer faced every other fencer.

== Schedule ==
The sabre was held in the morning of the fourth day of events..

Date		Time	Round
Gregorian	Julian	Time	Round
Thursday, 9 April 1896	Thursday, 28 March 1896	Morning	Final

== Results ==
The competition began before the king and crown prince arrived to watch; when they arrived after two rounds of fencing, the officials restarted the competition. Before the restart, Schmal had beaten Georgiadis and Nielsen; after the restart, he lost to both men.

Georgiadis was undefeated and thus won the gold medal. Karakalos had lost only to Georgiadis, while Nielsen had lost to those two and no others. Schmal's only victory was over Iatridis, who lost all four of his matches.

Pos	Fencer	W	L	TF	TA	IG	TK	HN	AS	GI
1st place, gold medalist(s)	Ioannis Georgiadis (GRE)	4	0	12	6		3–2	3–2	3–2	3–0
2nd place, silver medalist(s)	Tilemachos Karakalos (GRE)	3	1	11	5	2–3		3–2	3–0	3–0
3rd place, bronze medalist(s)	Holger Nielsen (DEN)	2	2	10	9	2–3	2–3		3–2	3–1
4	Adolf Schmal (AUT)	1	3	7	11	2–3	0–3	2–3		3–2
5	Georgios Iatridis (GRE)	0	4	3	12	0–3	0–3	1–3	2–3	

Source: Olympedia, OR pp. 77–78
