= Jacques Le Lavasseur =

French sailor

Personal information
- Nationality: French

Sailing career
- Sport: Sailing
- Club: Société Nautique de Marseille
- Class(es): 2 to 3 ton Open class
Medal record
Sailing
Representing Mixed team
Olympic Games
Gold medal – first place	1900 Paris	2 — 3 ton 1st race
Gold medal – first place	1900 Paris	2 — 3 ton 2nd race

Jacques Le Lavasseur (French pronunciation: [ʒak lə lavasœʁ]) was a French sailor who competed in the 1900 Summer Olympics.

He was crew on the British/French boat Ollé, which won the gold medals in both races of the 2–3 ton class with fellow crew member Frédéric Blanchy and helmsman William Exshaw. He also participated in the open class, but did not finish.
