= Jacques Doucet (sailor) =

French sailor

Personal information
- Nationality: French
- Died: probably between 1914 and 1918

Sailing career
- Sport: Sailing
- Club: Cercle de la voile de Paris; Yacht-Club de France
- Class(es): 2 to 3 ton Open class
Medal record
Sailing
Representing France
Olympic Games
Silver medal – second place	1900 Paris	2 — 3 ton 1st race
Silver medal – second place	1900 Paris	2 — 3 ton 2nd race

Jacques Doucet was a French sailor who competed in the 1900 Summer Olympics.

He was the crew member of the French boat Favorite 1, which won two silver medals in the races of the 2 to 3 ton class. He also participated in the Open class, but did not finish the race.

A memoir by the French painter Charles Picart Le Doux suggests that Doucet did not survive World War I.
