= Panagiotis Paraskevopoulos =

Greek athletics competitor

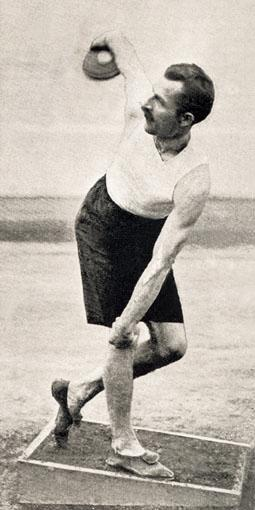
- Panagiotis Paraskevopoulos

Medal record

Men's athletics

Representing Greece

Olympic Games
| Silver medal – second place | 1896 Athens | Discus throw |

Panagiotis Paraskevopoulos (Greek: Παναγιώτης Παρασκευόπουλος, 1875 – 8 July 1956) was a Greek athlete. He competed at the 1896 Summer Olympics in Athens, and the 1900 Summer Olympics held in Paris. He was born in Gortynia and died in Corfu.

== Biography ==
Paraskevopoulos competed in the discus throw, at the 1896 Summer Olympics an event which the Greek public felt that a Greek athlete was sure to win. Indeed, when Paraskevopoulos threw the discus 28.95 metres, it seemed as if he had won the event. The only athlete left to throw was Robert Garrett of the United States, who had been unable to throw the discus any distance in his first two throws. Garrett's final attempt, however, was a good one and sailed to 29.15 metres, relegating Paraskevopoulos to second place.

Four years later Paraskevopoulos traveled to Paris, France, to compete at the 1900 Summer Olympics, he entered the shot put and with a distance of 11.29 metres he finished qualifying in fifth place, the final took place the next day, in the final he throw the put 11.52 metres, but this didn't change the positions and he still finished in fifth place as the throws from qualifying also counted towards the final. He also competed in his favoured event the discus throw, in the qualifying he threw 34.04 metres to qualify in fourth place, again he improved his distance in the final when throwing 34.50 metres but again his position didn't change and finished fourth just 10 centimetres behind Richard Sheldon from America, who won the bronze medal.
