= Tug of war at the 1900 Summer Olympics =

Tug of war at the Games of the II Olympiad
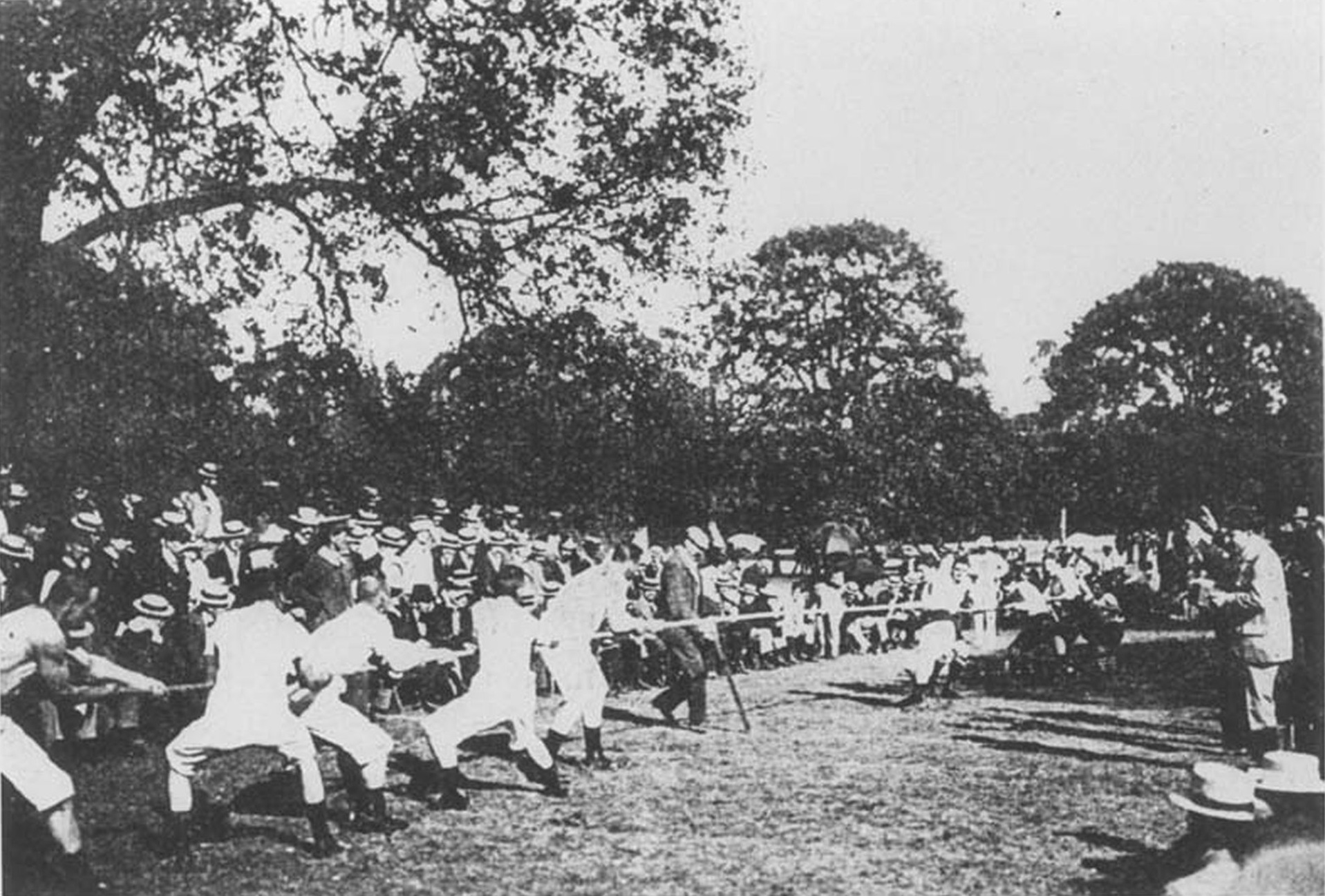
- The tug of war competition
- Venue: Catalan Cross, Boulogne Forest, Paris
- Dates: July 16, 1900
- Competitors: 12 from 4 nations

Medalists
1st place, gold medalist(s)		Denmark and Sweden; Mixed team
2nd place, silver medalist(s)		Racing Club de France; France

A tug of war tournament was held on 16 July at Catalan Cross, Boulogne Forest in Paris as part of the 1900 Summer Olympics. The only match of the tournament was between a mixed team from the Racing Club de France, consisting of five French and one Colombian athlete, and a mixed team consisting of three Danish athletes and three Swedish athletes. The mixed Scandinavian team won the match 2–0.

Originally, the Racing Club team were scheduled to face a team from the United States, but the latter had to withdraw due to a scheduling clash with the hammer throw, which three of their team were competing in.

The Scandinavians were accepted as late entrants by the organisers, with their team composed of five athletes who were competing in other events and one journalist, Edgar Aabye.

The Scandinavian team won both of the first two pulls against the French/Colombian team in a best-of-three contest to win the gold medal.

Due to a second unofficial match subsequently taking place between the United States and the Scandinavians, some records have erroneously listed the United States as gold medalists.

== Background ==
The modern Olympic Games were first held in Athens in 1896, and travelled to Paris four years later as part of the 1900 Exposition Universelle world's fair. The second Games featured a greatly expanded range of events from the first, up from 43 to 95. Among the events added in 1900 was the tug of war.

Two tug of war teams were entered for the Paris tournament: Racing Club de France represented the host nation, along with a team from the United States which was composed of six athletes that were taking part in various other events during the Games.

However, the American team were forced to withdraw after they discovered that the tug of war was scheduled at the same time as the hammer throw, in which three of their team members were competing. (Note: The three athletes taking part in the hammer throw, John Flanagan, Truxtun Hare and Josiah McCracken, won gold, silver and bronze for the United States in that event.)

A Scandinavian team was accepted as a late entry by the organisers, comprising a mix of Swedish and Danish athletes competing at the Games. Various reports assign the credit for the formation and entry of this team to different sources; a Danish account claimed that it was one of the Danish pullers, Eugen Schmidt, who was responsible, while a Swedish record attributed it to their representative at the Games, Lieutenant Fredrik Bergh.

== Team composition ==
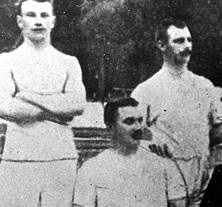
Karl Staaf, August Nilsson and Gustaf Söderström (clockwise from top-left) represented Sweden in a combined Scandinavian team.

The French team, representing the Racing Club de France, included 3 players who were later part of the gold-winning rugby team for France. (Note: Though the rugby matches did not take place until mid-October, three months after the tug of war.) Jean Collas, Charles Gondouin, and Émile Sarrade were all part of both teams, while it is often misreported that another of their rugby teammates, the Haitian-born Constantin Henriquez was also on the tug of war team, but this was a case of mistaken identity due to their similar names, with Colombian-born Francisco Henríquez de Zubiría taking part in the tug of war. The other two members of the tug-of-war team were Raymond Basset and Joseph Roffo. The combined Scandinavian team featured three athletes each from Sweden and Denmark. The Swedish competitors were August Nilsson, who also took part in the pole vault and shot put, Gustaf Söderström, who was competing in the shot put and the discus throw, and Karl Staaf, who did the pole vault, triple jump, standing triple jump and hammer throw. Only one of the three Danish pullers took part in any other events; Charles Winckler competed in the shot put and discus throw. Dane Edgar Aabye was at the Games as a journalist for the Politiken newspaper, but was recruited into the team to make up the numbers as one of the original entrants was injured. Eugen Schmidt, the sixth member of the team, had competed in the 100 metres sprint and the 200 metre rifle shooting at the 1896 Games, and founded the Danish Sports Federation that same year.

== Match ==
The match was played as a best-of-three. The mixed Scandinavian team won both of the first two pulls, using their greater weight, particularly that of Söderström and Winckler, to their advantage. The Swedish paper Ny Tidning för Idrott reported that the French team "put up desperate resistance" but were unable to cope with their opponents. There are sources that report that the Scandinavian team won by two pulls to one, but the majority record it as a 2–0 victory.

=== Confusion ===
As late as 1974, the Olympic Review listed the United States team of John Flanagan, Robert Garrett, Truxton Hare, Josiah McCracken, Lewis Sheldon and Richard Sheldon as the gold medalists for the 1900 tug of war. A report in the Paris edition of the New York Herald described the tug of war contest at the Olympic Games as being "an object lesson in how not to do a thing". The report mentioned the Scandinavian team's defeat of France, before detailing a second match between an American team and the Scandinavians.

The New York Herald recorded that in the second contest, a group of Americans formed a team to take on the victorious Scandinavians, beating them in two pulls, the second of which took over five minutes. In contrast, the Journal des Sports suggested that the Americans initially wanted to wear spiked shoes to take part in the match, but were then forced to remove them after protests. They then won the first pull against the mixed Swedish/Danish team, but during the second pull, some of their compatriots joined in pulling the rope to help the tiring team. A fight nearly broke out, but was avoided by the intervention of officials.

Regardless of the result of this second contest, it was not considered to be part of the official competition, but rather a private contest, so the United States are not considered to have officially taken part.

== Medalists ==
Gold	Silver	Bronze
Mixed team Edgar Aabye (DEN); August Nilsson (SWE); Eugen Schmidt (DEN); Gustaf Söderström (SWE); Karl Staaf (SWE); Charles Winckler (DEN)	France; Roger Basset; Jean Collas; Charles Gondouin; Joseph Roffo; Émile Sarrade; Francisco Henríquez de Zubiría (COL)	Not Awarded

== Bibliography ==
- Mallon, Bill (1998). The 1900 Olympic Games, Results for All Competitors in All Events, with Commentary. Jefferson, North Carolina: McFarland & Company, Inc., Publishers. ISBN 0-7864-0378-0.
