= Gilbert de Cotignon =

French sailor

Personal information
- Full name: Gilbert de Cotignon
- Nationality: French
- Born: 24 March 1868
- Died: 20 November 1937 (aged 69)

Sport

Sailing career
- Class(es): 2 to 3 ton Open class
Medal record
Sailing
Representing France
Olympic Games
Bronze medal – third place	1900 Paris	2 to 3 ton 1st race

Gilbert de Cotignon (24 March 1868 – 20 November 1937) was a French sailor who competed in the 1900 Summer Olympics. He was crew member of the French boat Gwendoline 2, which won a bronze medal in the first race of the 2 to 3 ton class. He also participated in the Open class, but did not finish the race.
