= Frederick Agnew Gill =

Manx polo player

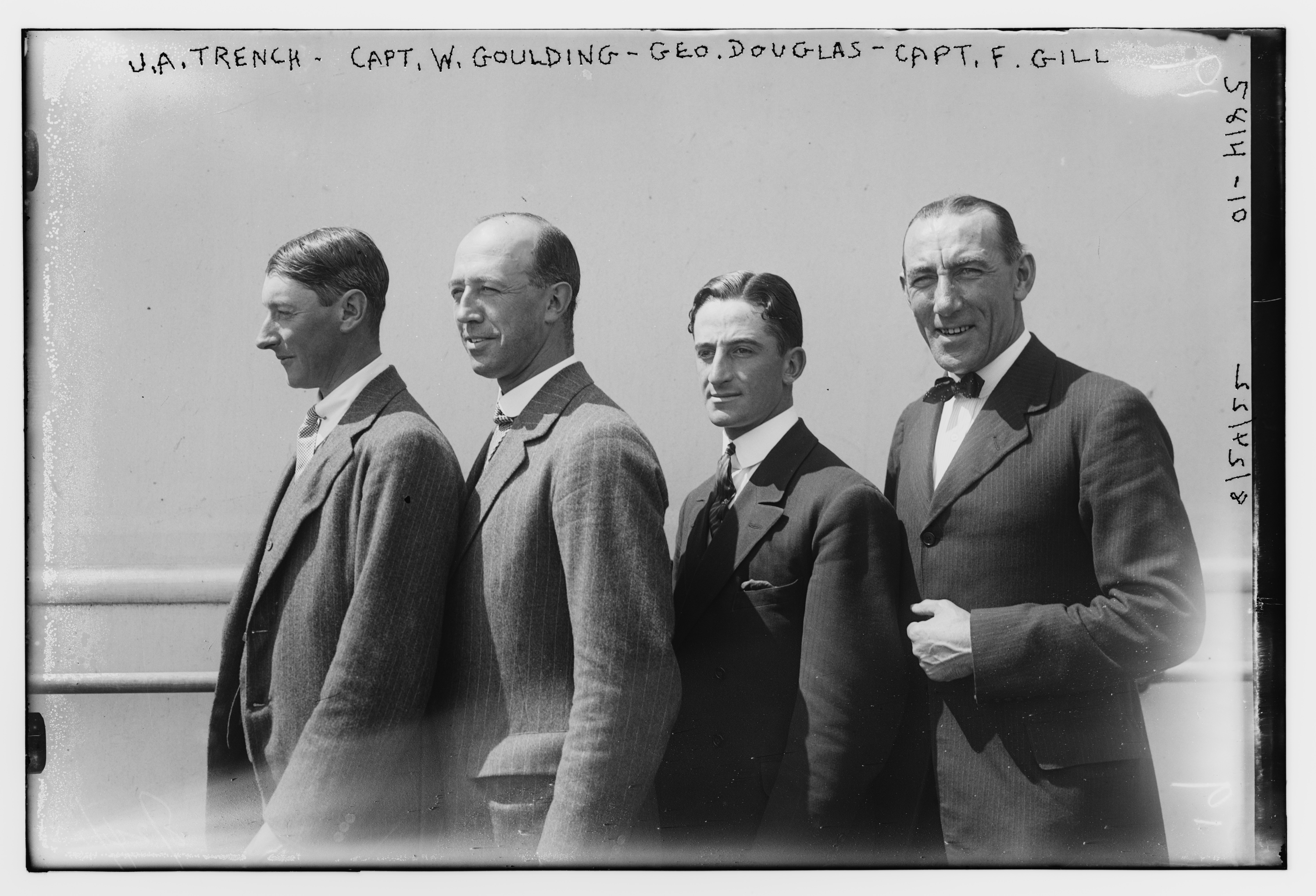
- Gill (far right) and the All Ireland Polo Club team of 1922

Medal record

Men's polo

Representing a Mixed team
Bronze medal – third place	1900 Paris	Team competition

Captain Frederick Agnew Gill (25 May 1873 in Castletown, Isle of Man – 4 June 1938 in Emery Down) was a British Army officer and a polo player in the 1900 Summer Olympics. He was polo manager at the Ranelagh Club in London.

== Biography ==
He was born in 1873 and educated at the Royal Military College, Sandhurst. On 13 March 1893 he was appointed a second lieutenant of the 3rd Dragoon Guards.

At the 1900 Olympics he was part of the Bagatelle Polo Club de Paris team, which won the bronze medal for polo.

At the outbreak of the First World War he rejoined the British Army as a second lieutenant in the Queen's Own Oxfordshire Hussars on 26 August 1914. On 1 December 1914 he was given a temporary promotion to captain. He was granted the permanent rank of captain on 21 January 1916.

After the war, he represented the All Ireland Polo Club in their 1922 visit to the USA.

He died in 1938.
