= Henri Mialaret =

French sailor

Personal information
- Full name: Mathias Joseph Ferdinand Jules Henri Mialaret
- Born: 2 August 1855 Charleville-Mézières, Second French Empire
- Died: 25 February 1919 (aged 63) Paris, France

Sport

Sailing career
- Class(es): 2 to 3 ton Open Class
- Club: Union des Yachts Français
Medal record
Sailing
Representing France
Olympic Games
Silver medal – second place	1900 Paris	2 — 3 ton 1st race
Silver medal – second place	1900 Paris	2 — 3 ton 2nd race

Mathias Joseph Ferdinand Jules Henri Mialaret (2 August 1855 – 25 February 1919) was a French sailor who competed in the 1900 Summer Olympics. He was the crew member of the French boat Favorite 1, which won two silver medals in the races of the 2 to 3 ton class. He also participated in the Open class, but did not finish the race.
