= Tilemachos Karakalos =

Greek fencer (1866–1951)

Medal record

Men's fencing

Representing Greece

Olympic Games
Silver medal – second place	1896 Athens	Sabre

Tilemachos Karakalos (Greek: Τηλέμαχος Καράκαλος, Dimitsana 1866 – 15 June 1951) was a Greek fencer. He competed at the 1896 Summer Olympics in Athens.

Karakalos competed in the men's sabre event. In the five-man, round-robin tournament, Karakalos won three of his four matches. He defeated Georgios Iatridis, Adolf Schmal, and Holger Nielsen but lost to countryman Ioannis Georgiadis. His 3-1 record put him in second place.
