= Auguste Donny =

French sailor (1851–1916)

Personal information
- Full name: Joseph Augustin Donny
- Born: 1 January 1851 Béziers, Second French Empire
- Died: 22 September 1916 (aged 65) Yport

Sport

Sailing career
- Class(es): 2 to 3 ton Open class
- Club: Cercle de la voile de Paris; Yacht Club de France
Medal record
Sailing
Representing France
Olympic Games
Bronze medal – third place	1900 Paris	2 — 3 ton 2nd race

Joseph Augustin "Auguste" Donny (1 January 1851 — 22 September 1916) was a French sailor who competed in the 1900 Summer Olympics.

He was helmsman of the French boat Mignon 3, which won a bronze medal in the second race of the 2 to 3 ton class. He also participated in the Open class, but did not finish the race.
