= Émile Jean-Fontaine =

French sailor

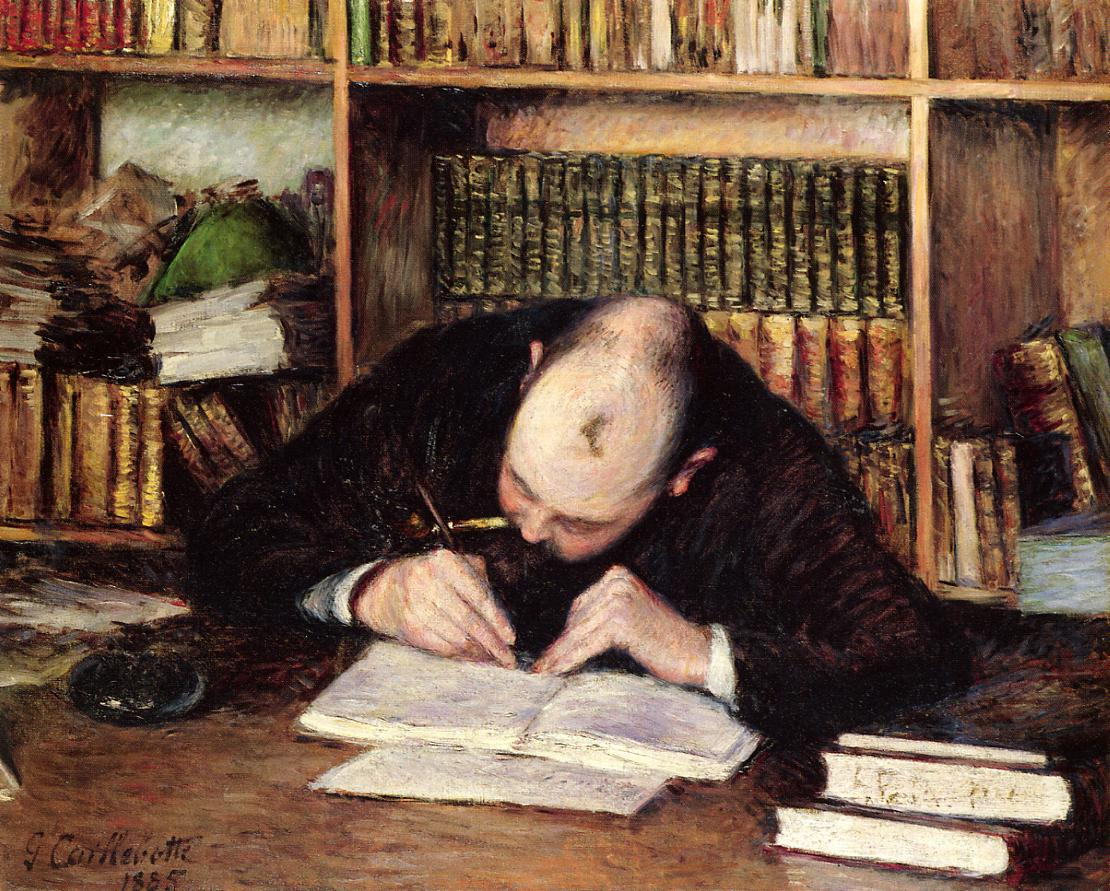

Personal information
- Full name: Émile Jean-Fontaine
- Nationality: French
- Born: 16 March 1839
- Died: 28 December 1905 (aged 66)

Sport

Sailing career
- Class(es): 2 to 3 ton Open class
Medal record
Sailing
Representing France
Olympic Games
Bronze medal – third place	1900 Paris	2 — 3 ton 1st race

Émile Jean-Fontaine (16 March 1839 – 28 December 1905) was a French sailor who competed in the 1900 Summer Olympics.

He was crew member of the French boat Gwendoline 2 which won a bronze medal in the first race of the 2 to 3 ton class. He also participated in the open class, but did not finish the race.
