= Joseph Roffo =

French sportsman (1879–1933)

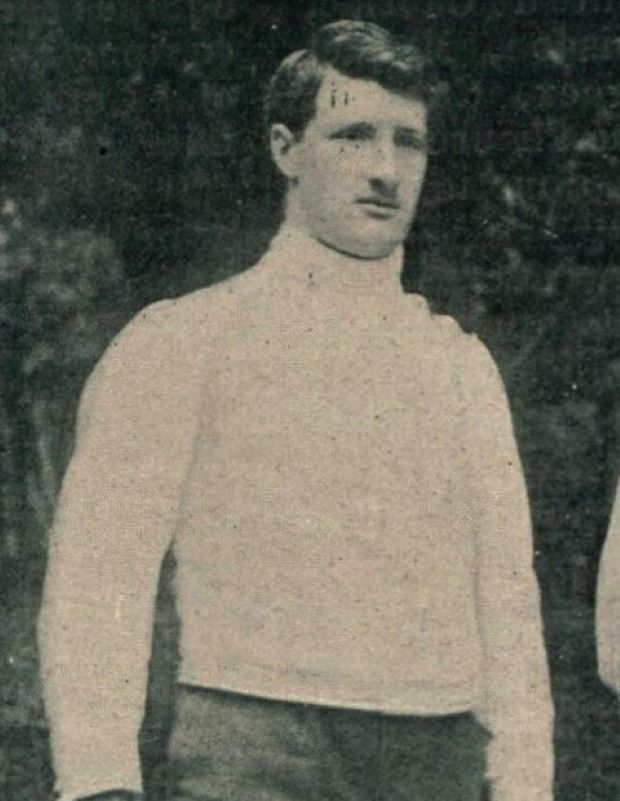
- Joseph Roffo at the 1900 Olympic Games

Personal information
- Full name: Louis Joseph Roffo
- Date of birth: 21 January 1879
- Place of birth: 10th arrondissement of Paris, France
- Date of death: 5 February 1933 (aged 54)
- Place of death: 16th arrondissement of Paris, France
- Position: Defender

Senior career*
| Years | Team | Apps | (Gls) |
| 1896–1899 | Racing Club de France | | |
Medal record
Men's tug of war
Representing France
Football at the Summer Olympics
| Silver medal – second place | 1900 Paris | Team competition |
- * Club domestic league appearances and goals

Louis Joseph Roffo (21 January 1879 – 5 February 1933) was a French sportsman who played football and rugby union for Racing Club de France in the late 1890s. He also participated in the tug of war event of the 1900 Summer Olympics in Paris, winning a silver medal as a member of the French team.

== Sporting career ==
=== Football ===
Born in the 10th arrondissement of Paris on 21 January 1879, Roffo began his sporting career at his hometown club Racing Club de France (RCF), where he practiced several sports, such as union rugby and football; for instance, on 4 April 1897, the 18-year-old Roffo did not hesitate to abandon a rugby game to replace the injured Guillaume de Saint-Cyr in a football championship match against CP Asnières, which ended in a loss as Racing finished fourth in the 1897 USFSA Championship. The local newspaper Tous les sports described this action as "good sportsmanship". Roffo had been playing for Racing's football team as early as January 1897, when he started as a defender against United Sports Club (1–1). Two years later, on 22 October 1899, he started in a match against Paris Star, in which he was forced to leave the pitch due to injury.

=== Other sports ===
In 1896, the 17-year-old Roffo became the French scholastic champion in the 100 meters, so he was selected as a member of the RCF team that participated in the French Athletics Championships in 1896, where he finished third in the 100 meters. Two years later, he won a interschool fencing championship, and in April 1899, he participated in a fencing tournament in Brussels, in which he defeated Mr. Vivès, who was replacing the ill Mr. Louradour.

The following year, Roffo was a member of the French team that won the silver medal in the tug-of-war event at the 1900 Summer Olympics in Paris; the team was mainly made up of RCF members, such as Roger Basset and Charles Gondouin.

== Later life and death ==
In 1904, Roffo graduated from the École Centrale Paris as an engineer in manufacturing and arts. He eventually became the managing director of the Société des Établissements Roffo.

Roffo lived his entire life in Paris, dying in the 16th arrondissement of Paris on 5 February 1933, at the age of 54. His funeral was held three days later and he was buried at the Père Lachaise Cemetery.
