= Georgios Iatridis =

Greek fencer

Georgios Iatridis was a Greek fencer. He participated in the 1896 Summer Olympics in Athens. Iatridis competed in the sabre event. In the five-man, round-robin tournament, he lost all four of his matches. He was defeated by Ioannis Georgiadis, Adolf Schmal, Telemachos Karakalos and Holger Nielsen, taking last place.
