= František Janda-Suk =

Czech shot putter and discus thrower

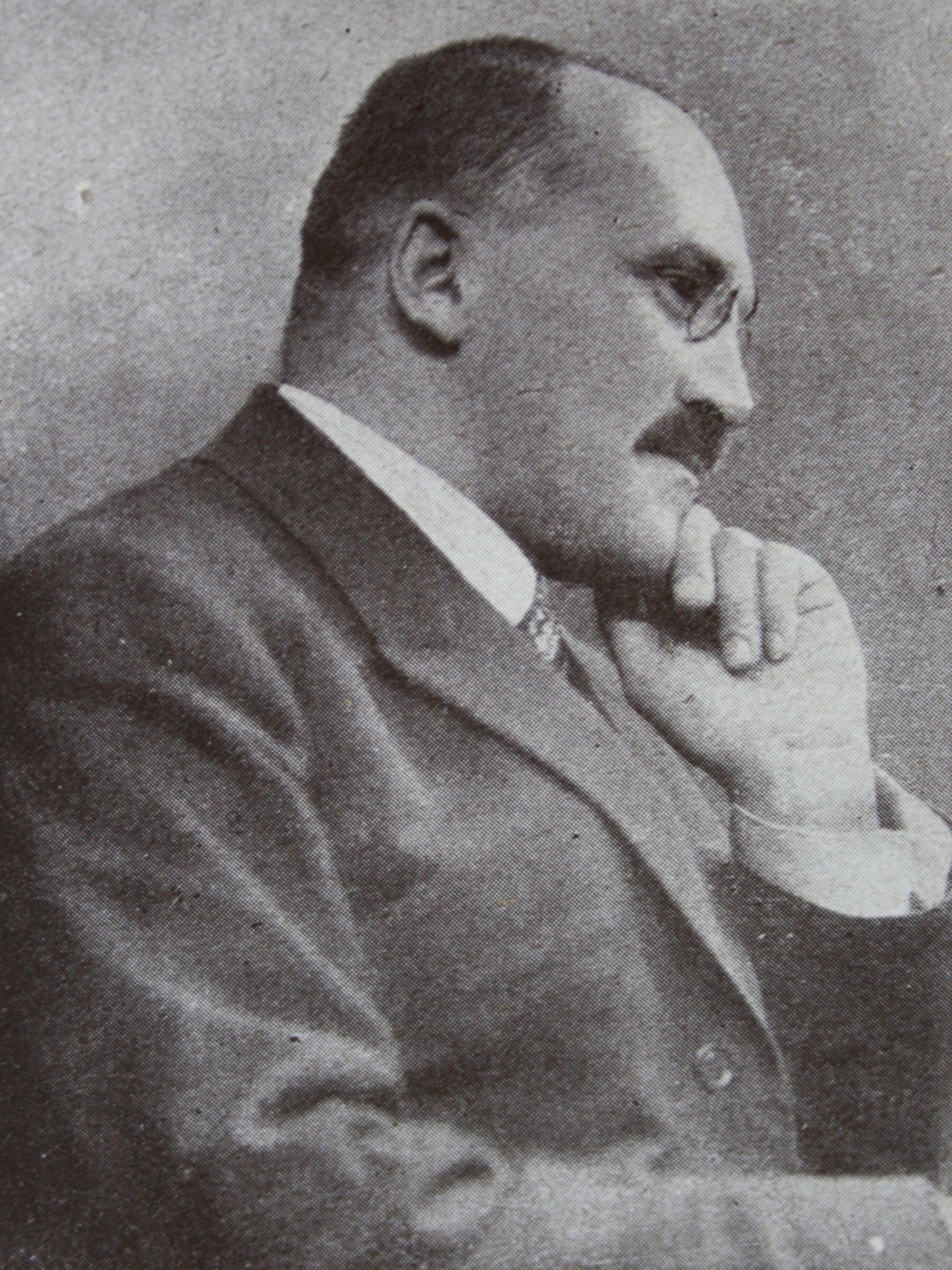

Personal information
- Born: 25 March 1878 Postřižín near Roudnice nad Labem, Austria-Hungary
- Died: 23 June 1955 (aged 77) Prague, Czechoslovakia
Medal record
Men's athletics
Representing Bohemia
Olympic Games
Silver medal – second place	1900 Paris	Discus throw

František Janda-Suk (Czech pronunciation: [ˈfrancɪʃɛk ˈjanda ˈsuk], 25 March 1878 – 23 June 1955) was a Czech athlete who competed for Bohemia in the 1900 Summer Olympics and in the 1912 Summer Olympics and Czechoslovakia at the 1924 Summer Olympics. He was the first ever discus thrower to introduce the spin technique.

He was born in Postřižín near Roudnice nad Labem and died in Prague.

In the 1900 Summer Olympics held in Paris, France, where he won the silver medal in the discus throw.

He—and the Hungarian Rudolf Bauer—was the first modern athlete to throw the discus while rotating the whole body. He invented this technique when studying the position of the famous statue of Discobolus. After only one year of developing the technique he gained the olympic silver.

At the 1912 Summer Olympics in Stockholm, Sweden he was 15th in shot put and 17th in discus throw .
