= Dunatetétlen =

- Coat of arms

- Location within Hungary
- Coordinates: 46°45′N 19°07′E
- Country: Hungary
- County: Bács-Kiskun

Area
  - Total: 43.19 km^{2} (16.68 sq mi)

Population (2015)
  - Total: 528
  - Density: 12.2/km^{2} (32/sq mi)
- Time zone: UTC+1 (CET)
  - Summer (DST): UTC+2 (CEST)
- Postal code: 6325
- Area code: 78

Dunatetétlen (Croatian: Tatilan) is a village in Bács-Kiskun county, in the Southern Great Plain region of Hungary.

== Geography ==
It covers an area of 4,319 km^{2} (1,668 sq mi) and has a population of 528 people (2015).
