= Charles Winckler =

Danish athlete (1867–1932)

Personal information
- Born: Charles Gustav Wilhelm Winckler; 9 April 1867 Frederiksberg, Denmark
- Died: 17 December 1932 (aged 65) Frederiksberg, Denmark

Sport
- Sport: Shot put, discus, swimming, tug of war
Medal record
Men's tug of war
Representing a Mixed team
Summer Olympics
Gold medal – first place	1900 Paris	Team

Charles Gustav Wilhelm Winckler (9 April 1867 – 17 December 1932) was a Danish thrower, swimmer, and tug of war competitor. He was set to compete in three swimming events at the 1896 Summer Olympics but did not start in any. He then competed at the 1900 Summer Olympics in the men's discus throw and men's shot put on behalf of Denmark, though he did not reach the finals of either event. Alongside Swedish competitors, he won the gold medal in the tug of war tournament at the games.

Domestically, Winckler represented Handelsstandens AK. He became a three-time national champion in the shot put and one-time champion in the discus throw. For a period of eight years, he held the national record in the shot put, while he held the discus throw record for a period of eleven years.

== Biography ==
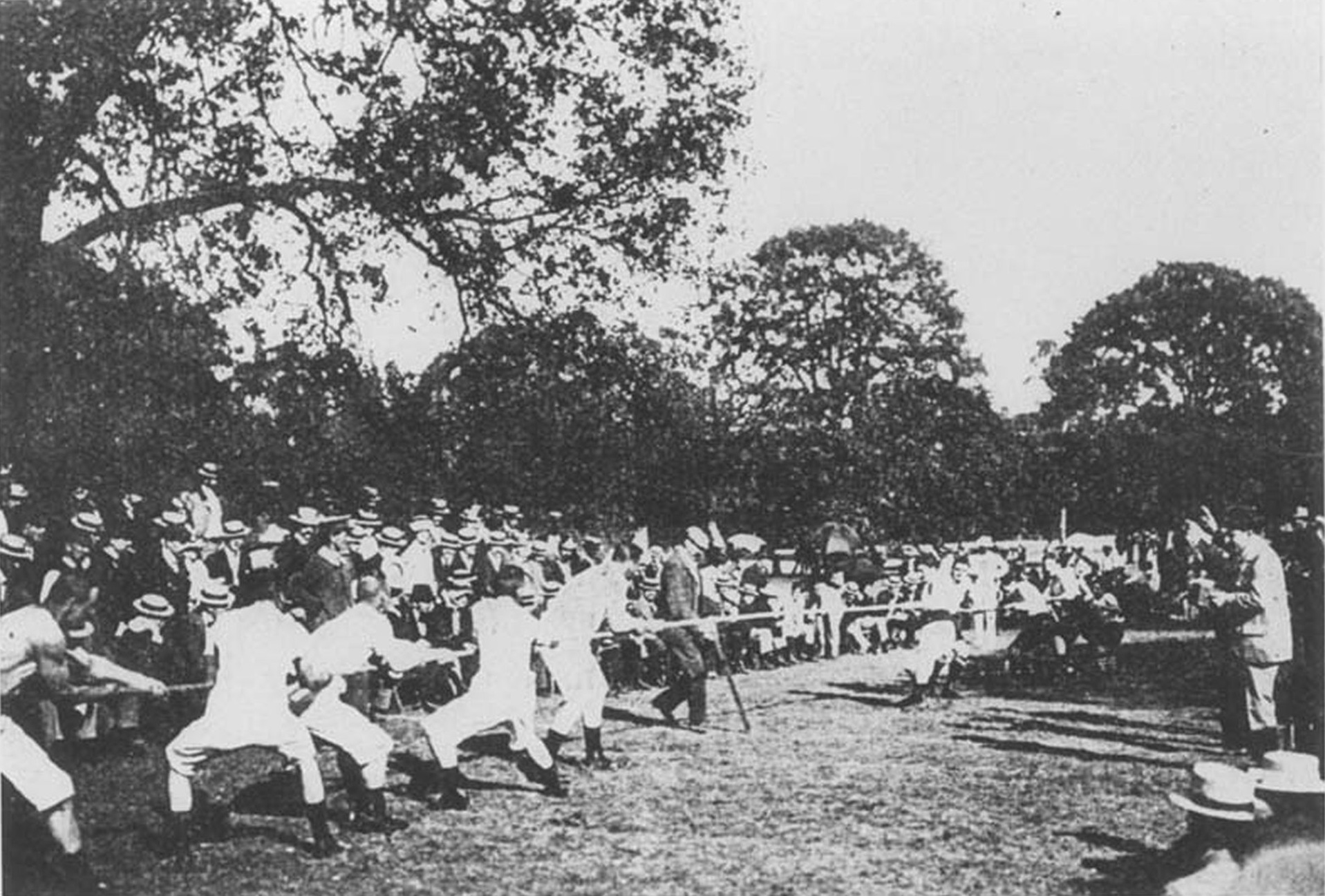
Tug of war at the 1900 Summer Olympics

Charles Gustav Wilhelm Winckler was born on 9 April 1867 in Frederiksberg, Denmark. Domestically, he represented the sports club Handelsstandens AK which was based in Copenhagen. He was set to compete on behalf of Denmark at the 1896 Summer Olympics in Athens as a swimmer, though did not start in his events. He was entered in the men's 100 metre freestyle, men's 500 metre freestyle, and men's 1200 metre freestyle.

Winckler mostly competed in the men's shot put and discus throw. From 1896 to 1903, he held the national record for the shot put and from 1897 to 1907, held the national record for the discus throw. He was part of the Danish team at the 1900 Summer Olympics, competing in those events. In the qualification round of the men's shot put on 14 July, he recorded a distance of 10.76 metres and did not qualify for the finals, placing 10th out of the 11 competitors in the event. He also competed in the qualification round of the men's discus throw on the same day. He recorded a distance of 32.50 metres and did not qualify for the finals, placing eighth overall.

At the same games, he competed in a Scandinavian team composed of Danish and Swedish competitors for the tug of war tournament on 16 July. There, they defeated the only other team entered, the Racing Club de France, 2 to 0. They won the gold medal. After the 1900 Summer Games, he would go on and become the Danish champion in the shot put from 1901 to 1903 and in the discus throw in 1902. He died on 17 December 1932 in Frederiksberg.
