= Volker Kluge =

German sports journalist (born 1944)

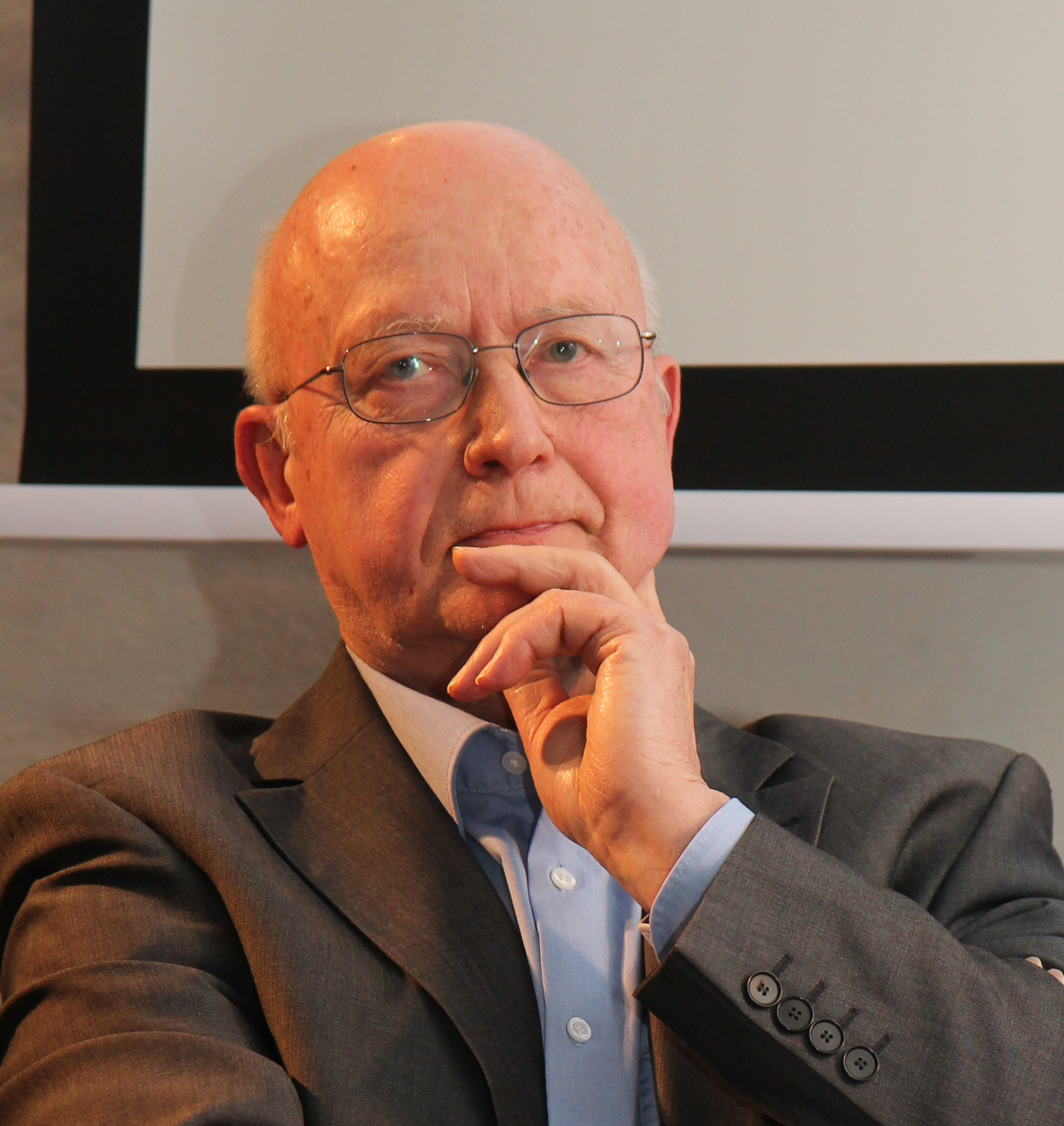
- Born: 14 October 1944; Altenburg
- Occupations: sports journalist and former sports official
- Awards: Distinguished Service Medal of the National People's Army in bronze (1989)

Volker Kluge (born 14 October 1944) is a German sports journalist and former sports official in East Germany.

== Career ==
Kluge was born in Altenburg. From 1967 to 1971 he studied journalism in Leipzig. He became member of the Socialist Unity Party of Germany in 1970. From 1971 to 1990 he was sports journalist and eventually editor for the newspaper Junge Welt. He was member of the National Olympic Committee of East Germany from 1982 to 1990. He was awarded the Distinguished Service Medal of the National People's Army in 1989.

From 1980 to 1989 Kluge was also an informal collaborator (informant) in the German Democratic Republic (East Germany), delivering information to the Ministry for State Security (MfS / Stasi), with the cover name "Frank".

His books include Olympische Spiele 1896 – 1980 (1981), Meilenweit bis Marathon (1987), Katarina – eine Traumkarriere auf dem Eis (1988), Olympiastadion Berlin. Steine beginnen zu reden (1999), Otto der Seltsame. Die Einsamkeit eines Mittelstreckenläufers (2000), and Max Schmeling. Eine Biographie in 15 Runden (2004).

== Criticism ==
Kluge has been accused of falsifying information in his many biographies in the encyclopedia Wer war wer in der DDR? and in his 2004 book Das große Lexikon der DDR-Sportler, by omitting or toning down negative information, such as doping issues or Stasi collaboration.
