= August Nilsson =

Swedish athlete

Medal record

Men's tug of war

Representing Mixed team

Olympic Games
Gold medal – first place	1900 Paris	Team competition

August Nilsson (October 15, 1872 in Trollenäs – May 23, 1921 in Stockholm) was a Swedish track and field athlete and tug of war competitor who competed at the 1900 Summer Olympics in Paris, France.

== Athletic career ==
He finished ninth in the shot put event and eighth in the pole vault competition.

He also participated on the Dano-Swedish tug of war team which won the gold medal against opponents France. These were the first Olympic gold medals for Sweden.

== See also ==
- Dual sport and multi-sport Olympians
