= Eugen Schmidt =

Danish sportsman (1862–1931)

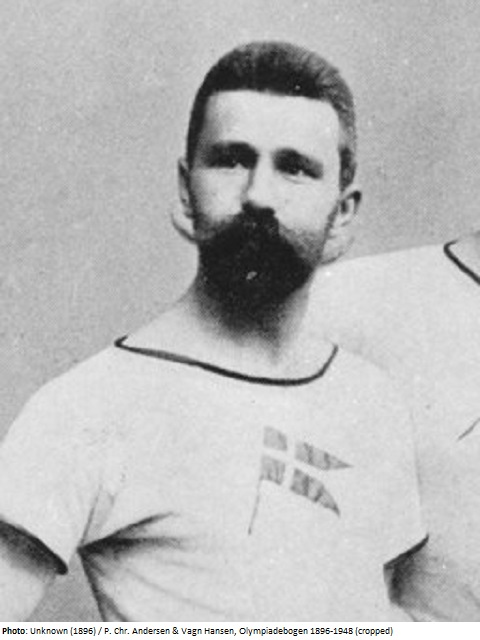
- Schmidt in 1896

Personal information
- Born: Eugen Stahl Schmidt; 17 February 1862 Copenhagen, Denmark
- Died: 7 October 1931 (aged 69) Aalborg, Denmark
Medal record
Men's tug of war
Representing a Mixed team
Gold medal – first place	1900 Paris	Team competition

Eugen Stahl Schmidt (17 February 1862 – 7 October 1931) was a Danish shooter, athlete, and tug of war competitor. He competed at the 1896 Summer Olympics in Athens and at the 1900 Summer Olympics in Paris.

== Background ==
Schmidt was an active sportsman and an outstanding athlete, practicing several modalities such as gymnastics, rowing, athletics, tennis, football, fencing, skating, golf and swimming. He was particularly interested in English sport, visiting England several times. In Denmark, the first athletics event was held by the Københavns Roklub in 1886 at the initiative of sports pioneers such as Jørgen Peter Müller and himself, being the chairman of Københavns Roklub, the second oldest rowing club in the country. He also became a board member of the Danish Rowing Federation, for which he served as chairman between 1894 and 1896.

In 1896 he co-founded DIF, the Danish Sports Federation. Between 1885 and 1899 he was a brewmaster at Carlsberg. He would also write for a sports magazine and had a few sports books published.

== Olympics ==
In 1896, Schmidt participated as one of three Danish athletes who competed at the 1896 Summer Olympics in Athens, Greece. He competed in two events: In the 100 metres event, he finished fourth in his heat and did not advance to the final. He also competed in the military rifle event, finishing tied for twelfth place with 845 points; Schmidt hit the target 12 times out of his 40 shots. Together with fellow Københavns Roklub athlete Holger Nielsen, Schmidt also participated in the unofficial football event in which a Danish XI faced a Greek team as a "demonstration sport", and it was the Danes who came-out as the winners by either 9–0 or 15–0.

Four years later, Schmidt competed at the 1900 Summer Olympics in Paris, France. This time he was competing for the mixed team in the tug of war, with the team consisting of three Danish and three Swedish athletes. The American team withdrew, so Schmidt's team was up against the French team in the final. The mixed side won the first two pulls and so were awarded the gold medal.

In the 1912 he was back on the Olympic scene as the director for the Danish rowing team at the 1912 Summer Olympics in Stockholm, Sweden.
