= Gustaf Söderström =

Swedish athlete (1865–1958)

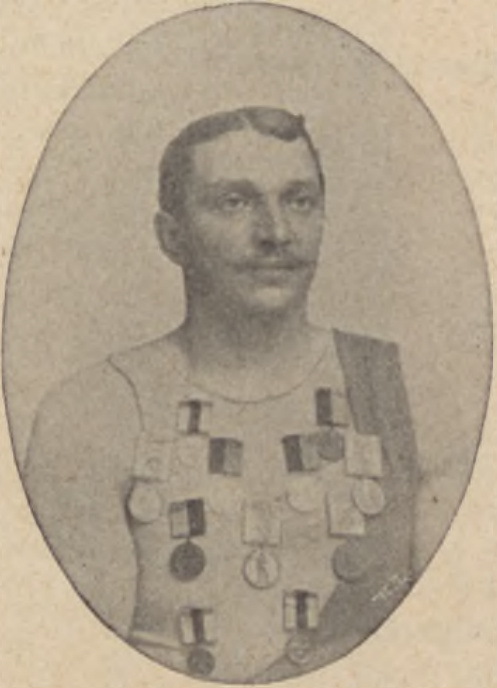
- Gustaf Söderström in 1897

Personal information
- Nationality: Swedish
- Born: Gustaf Fredrik Söderström; 25 November 1865 Stockholm, Sweden
- Died: 12 November 1958 Lidingö, Sweden
Medal record
Men's tug of war
Representing a Mixed team
Gold medal – first place	1900 Paris	Team competition

Gustaf Fredrik "Jotte" Söderström (November 25, 1865 in Stockholm – November 12, 1958 in Lidingö) was a Swedish athlete and tug of war competitor.

Söderström represented Djurgårdens IF. He is the brother of Olympic medal-winning athlete Bruno Söderström.

Söderström became two times Swedish national champion in both the shot put and discus throw. In 1897 his mark in the discus throw was a distance of 38.70 m and was further than the world record. Howeverz, for an unknown reason, this achievement became an official world record. He competed at the 1900 Summer Olympics, where he won the discus-throw with handicap event, that is nowadays not listed as an official Olympic event. He finished sixth in both the official shot put and discus throw. He also participated on the Dano-Swedish tug of war team which won the gold medal against opponents France. These were the first Olympic gold medals for Sweden.

Söderström worked initially as an electrician and later as a mechanic at Norsborg’s waterworks.

== See also ==
- Dual sport and multi-sport Olympians
