= Francisco Henríquez de Zubiría =

Colombian-French tug of war competitor

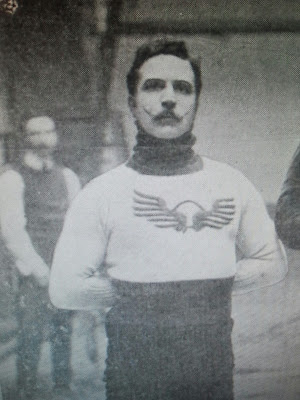

Personal information
- Born: 1869 Paris, France
- Died: 1933 (aged 63–64)

Sport
- Sport: Tug of war
Medal record
Representing France
Olympic Games
Silver medal – second place	1900 Paris	Team competition

Francisco Henríquez de Zubiría (Paris, 1869 – 1933) was a French-born Colombian who represented France at the 1900 Summer Olympics in the tug of war team competition; they won a silver medal.

The son of Ricardo Carlos Henríquez and Maria Ana Antonia Clemencia de Zubiría y Osse, he was a Colombian citizen until he was naturalized as a Frenchman in 1917. He studied medicine and worked at the Colombian embassy in Paris, also serving as a doctor during World War I for the French Army.
