= Edgar Aabye =

Danish tug of war Olympian (1865–1941)

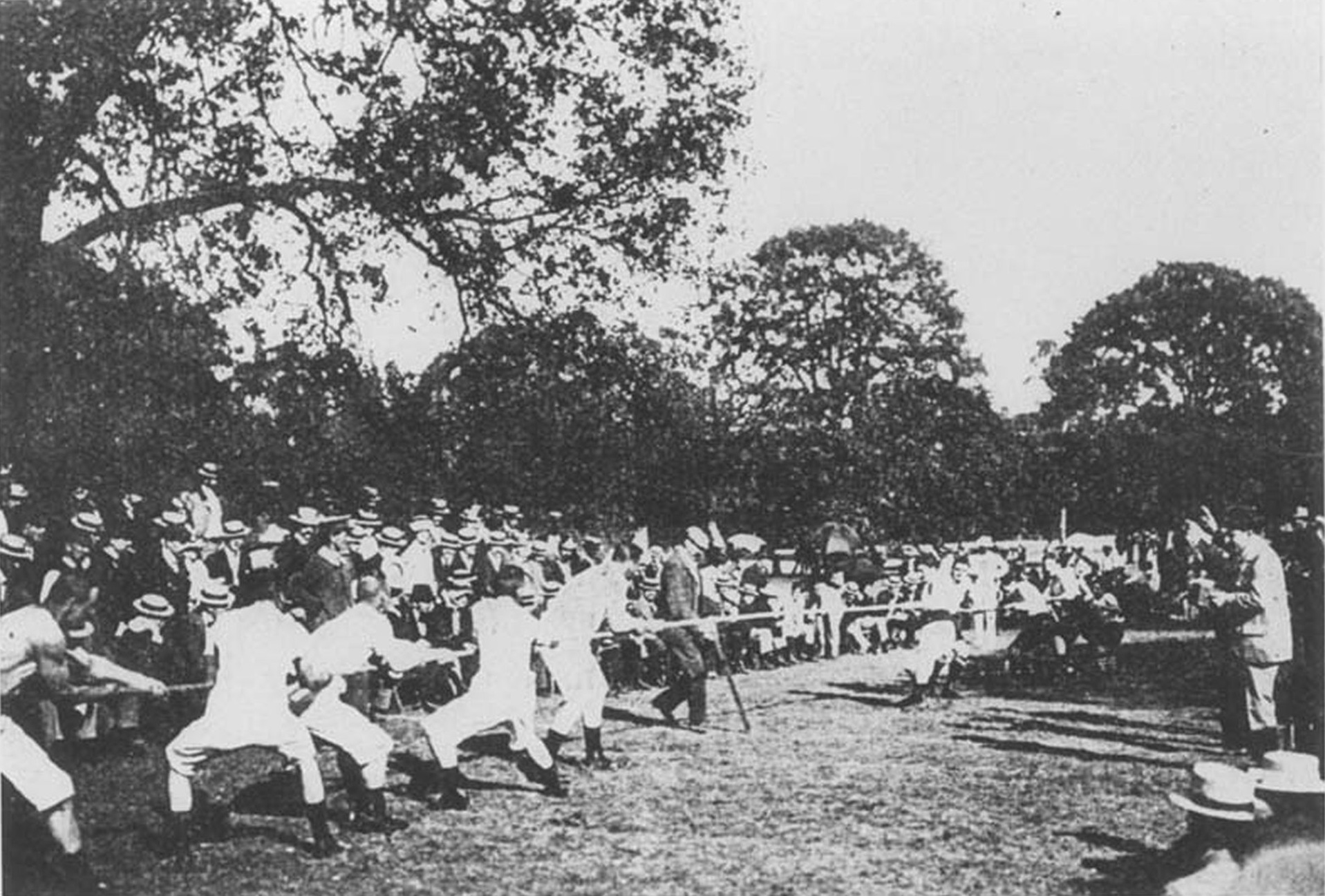
- The Tug of war competition at the 1900 Olympic Games in Paris - Denmark/Sweden v France

Personal information
- Full name: Edgar Lindenau Aabye
- Born: 14 September 1865 Helsingør, Denmark
- Died: 30 April 1941 (aged 75) Copenhagen, Denmark
- Occupation: Journalist
Medal record
Men's tug of war
Representing a Mixed team
Gold medal – first place	1900 Paris	Team competition

Edgar Lindenau Aabye (14 September 1865 – 30 April 1941) was a Danish athlete and journalist who earned a gold medal in the tug of war at the age of 34 in the 1900 Summer Olympics in Paris, France, after joining the team as a last-minute substitute.

Aabye was an accomplished athlete who had previously won a Danish championship in swimming (1896) and been a competitor in rowing and cycling. Aabye joined the team which then competed in the only tug-of-war contest, defeating the French team for the gold medal. Initially, Aabye was not a member of the tug-of-war team but was working at the Paris Olympics as a journalist for the Politiken newspaper. When a member of the combined Dano-Swedish tug of war team was injured, the team asked Aabye to fill in as a last-minute substitute.

He was the nation's first sports journalist as he worked for the broadsheet Politiken from 1892 until 1935. He had previously studied theology and taught history and geography at a middle school.
