= Karl Gustaf Staaf =

Swedish athlete

Medal record

Men's tug of war

Representing a Mixed team

Olympic Games
Gold medal – first place	1900 Paris	Team competition

Karl Gustaf Vilhelm Staaf (April 6, 1881 – February 15, 1953) was a Swedish track and field athlete and tug of war competitor who competed at the 1900 Summer Olympics. He was born in Stockholm and died in Motala.

He finished seventh in the pole vault competition and fifth in the hammer throw event. In the triple jump event and in the standing triple jump event his exact results are unknown.

He also participated on the Dano-Swedish tug of war team which won the gold medal against opponents France. These were the first Olympic gold medals for Sweden.

Staaf represented Djurgårdens IF.

== See also ==
- Dual sport and multi-sport Olympians
