= Jean Collas =

French rugby union player

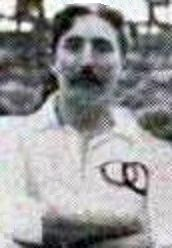
Medal record
Olympic medal record
Men's rugby union
Representing France
Gold medal – first place	1900 Paris	Team competition
Men's tug of war
Silver medal – second place	1900 Paris	Team competition

Jean Collas (3 July 1874 in Paris – 30 December 1928 in Asnières-sur-Seine, France) was a French rugby union player and tug of war competitor, who competed in the 1900 Summer Olympics. He was a member of the French rugby union team, which won the gold medal. He also participated in the tug of war competition and won a silver medal as a member of the French team.
