= Charles Gondouin =

French rugby union player (1875–1947)

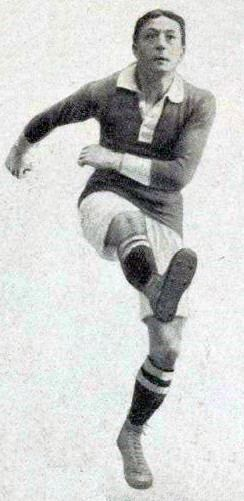
- Gondouin in 1900
- Born: 21 July 1875; Paris, France
- Died: 25 December 1947 (aged 72); Paris, France

Olympic medal record

Men's rugby union

Representing France
Gold medal – first place	1900 Paris	Team competition

Men's tug of war
Silver medal – second place	1900 Paris	Team competition

Charles Gondouin (21 July 1875 – 25 December 1947) was a French rugby union player and tug of war competitor who competed in the 1900 Summer Olympics. He was a member of the French rugby union team, which won the gold medal. Gondouin studied at the Lycée Condorcet, then worked as a sports journalist. He also participated in the tug of war competition and won a silver medal as a member of French team. He was killed on Christmas Eve when he was struck by a motorist in Paris while returning from a meeting for a racing club in France.
