= André Roosevelt =

American filmmaker (born 1879)

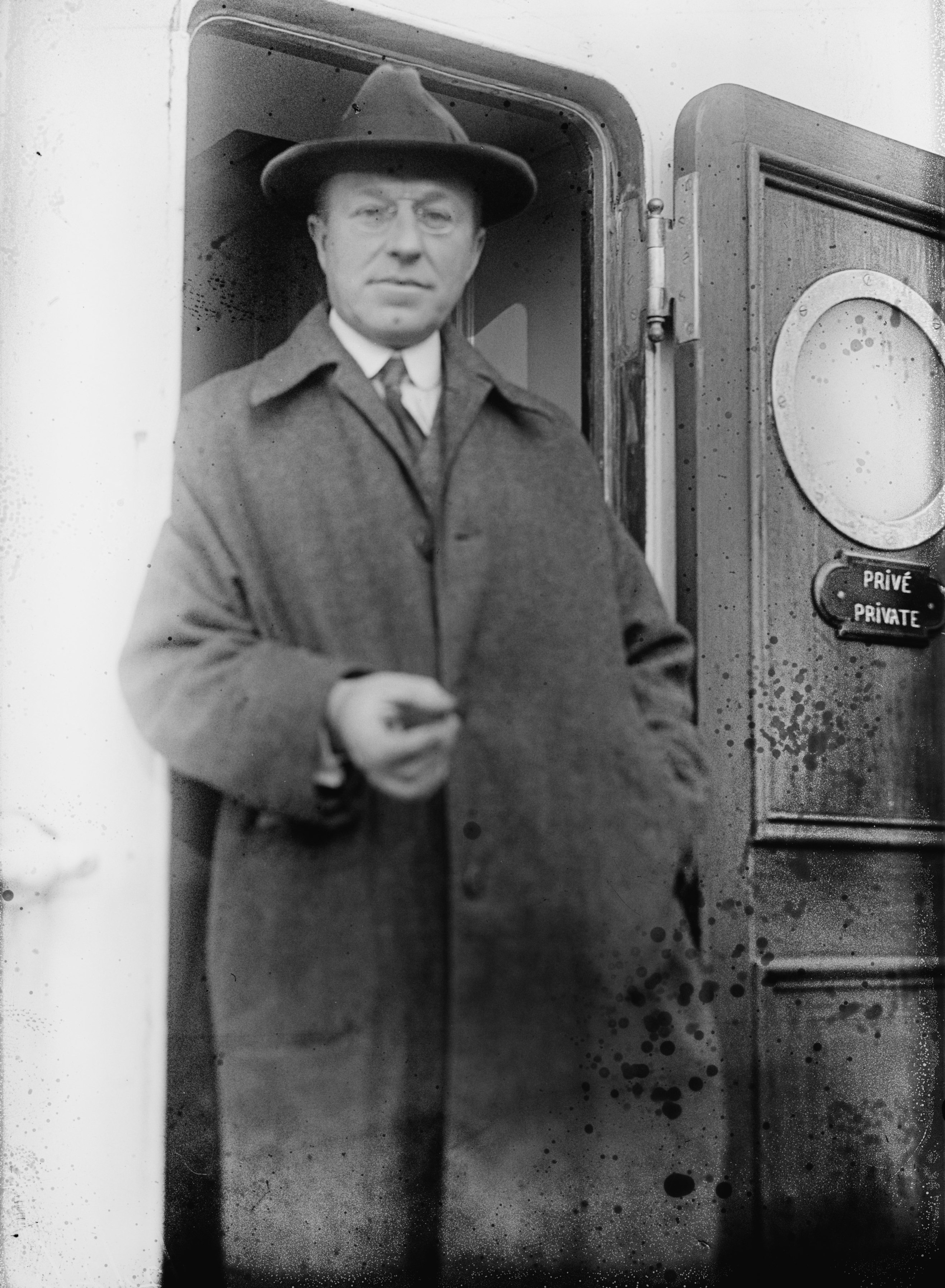

Personal information
- Born: Cornelius Louis André Roosevelt; April 24, 1879 Paris
- Died: July 21, 1962 (aged 83) Port-au-Prince, Haiti
- Occupation: filmmaker
- Family: See Roosevelt family
Medal record
Men's Rugby union
Representing Mixed team
Olympic Games
Gold medal – first place	1900 Paris	Rugby union

Cornelius Louis André Roosevelt (April 24, 1879 – July 21, 1962) was a French-born American filmmaker and resort hotel manager of American origin.

== Early life ==
He was born in Paris to Cornelius Roosevelt (1847–1902), a cousin of U.S. President Theodore Roosevelt, who married a French actress Anna and was baptized at the American Cathedral, Paris. He won a gold medal in rugby union at the 1900 Summer Olympics with the French team. He was a member of The Explorers Club like his cousin Theodore Roosevelt.

He married first Adelheid Lange in 1905, then after a divorce, Alice La Fontant in Haiti. Roosevelt was an adventurer, traveling to Bali in 1924, attempting to develop the tourist market, but at the same time preserve Bali's cultural integrity. He envisioned making Bali a national or international park with laws to regulate it as such. In 1928 and 1929, he and Armand Denis shot Goona-Goona, An Authentic Melodrama (also called The Kris) with assistance from Walter Spies. It was released in the United States in 1930 and started an American craze for Bali. He was also known for his 1938 film Beyond the Caribbean. He died in July 1962 in Port-au-Prince, Haiti.
