= Léon Binoche =

French rugby union player

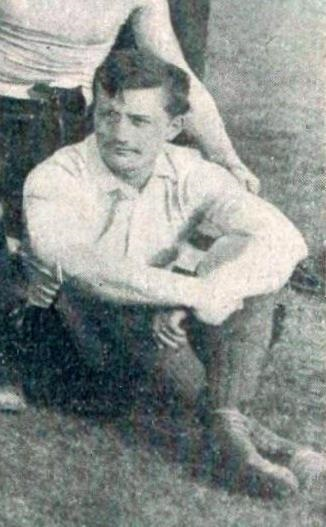
- Léon Binoche in 1899
- Born: 16 August 1878; Champs-sur-Yonne, France
- Died: 28 August 1962 (aged 84); Ferney-Voltaire, France
- Relatives: Juliette Binoche (great-niece)

Olympic medal record

Men's rugby union

Representing France
Gold medal – first place	1900 Paris	Team competition

Léon Binoche (16 August 1878 – 28 August 1962) was a French rugby union player who competed in the 1900 Summer Olympics. He was a member of the French rugby union team, which won the gold medal. His great-niece is the actress Juliette Binoche.

== Family ==
Léon Binoche is the son of the merchant Adolphe Binoche (1827-1911), president of the Chamber of Commerce of Rio de Janeiro, director of Chargeurs Réunis and of the maritime insurance company La Mélusine, and of Ursula Rosa de Araujo Mattos, of Brazilian nationality.

He is the father of the resistance fighter and politician Antoinette Binoche (1910-2001) and of the resistance fighter and Companion of the Liberation, General François Binoche (1911-1997), the grandfather of the academic and historian Jacques Binoche (born in 1938), and the great-uncle of the actress Juliette Binoche (born in 1964).
