= Football at the 1900 Summer Olympics – Men's team squads =

This is a list of football teams that played at the 1900 Summer Olympics.

== (United Kingdom) Upton Park F.C. ==
The Upton Park team included a number of guest players from other clubs.
Player coach: James Jones (England)

No.	Pos.	Player	Date of birth (age)	Caps	Goals	Club
	GK	(England) James Jones	18 November 1873 (aged 26)	0	0	(The Football Association) Upton Park F.C.
	DF	(England) Claude Buckenham	16 January 1876 (aged 24)	0	0	(The Football Association) Upton Park F.C.
	DF	(England) William Gosling	19 July 1869 (aged 31)	0	0	(The Football Association) Upton Park F.C.
	MF	(England) Alfred Chalk	27 November 1874 (aged 25)	0	0	(The Football Association) Upton Park F.C.
	MF	(England) T. E. Burridge	30 April 1881 (aged 19)	0	0	(The Football Association) Upton Park F.C.
	MF	(England) William Quash	27 December 1868 (aged 31)	0	0	(The Football Association) Upton Park F.C.
	FW	(England) Richard Turner	24 April 1882 (aged 18)	0	1	(The Football Association) Crouch End Vampires F.C.
	FW	(England) Fred Spackman	16 September 1878 (aged 22)	0	0	(The Football Association) Fulham F.C.
	FW	(England) John Nicholas	24 July 1879 (aged 21)	0	2	(The Football Association) Upton Park F.C.
	FW	(England) Jack Zealley	2 November 1874 (aged 25)	0	1	(The Football Association) Bridport F.C.
	FW	(England) Henry Haslam (c)	5 June 1879 (aged 21)	0	0	(The Football Association) Upton Park F.C.

== (France) USFSA ==
No.	Pos.	Player	Date of birth (age)	Caps	Goals	Club
	DF	(France) Pierre Allemane	19 January 1882 (aged 18)	0	0	(French Football Federation) Club Français
	DF	(France) Louis Bach	14 April 1883 (aged 17)	0	0	(French Football Federation) Club Français
	MF	(France) Alfred Bloch	22 February 1878 (aged 22)	0	0	(French Football Federation) Club Français
	FW	(France) Fernand Canelle	2 January 1882 (aged 18)	0	0	(French Football Federation) Club Français
	FW	(France) René Ressejac-Duparc	28 September 1880 (aged 19)	0	0	(French Football Federation) Club Français
	FW	(France) Eugène Fraysse (c1)	4 May 1870 (aged 30)	0	0	(French Football Federation) Racing club de France
	MF	(France) Virgile Gaillard	28 July 1877 (aged 23)	0	0	(French Football Federation) Club Français
	FW	(France) Georges Garnier (c2)	14 May 1878 (aged 22)	0	0	(French Football Federation) Club Français
	FW	(France) René Grandjean	0 December 1882 (aged 17–18)	0	0	(French Football Federation) Club Français
	GK	(France) Lucien Huteau	26 May 1878 (aged 22)	0	0	(French Football Federation) Club Français
	FW	(France) Marcel Lambert	0 December 1876 (aged 23–24)	0	1	(French Football Federation) Club Français
	MF	(France) Maurice Macaire	22 November 1881 (aged 18)	0	0	(French Football Federation) Racing club de France
	FW	(France) Gaston Peltier	2 August 1877 (aged 23)	0	1	(French Football Federation) Club Français

== (Belgium) Université de Bruxelles ==
No.	Pos.	Player	Date of birth (age)	Caps	Goals	Club
	FW	(Belgium) Marius Delbecque		0	0	(Royal Belgian Football Association) Skill F.C. de Bruxelles
	FW	(Netherlands) Hendrik van Heuckelum	6 May 1879 (aged 21)	0	1	(Royal Belgian Football Association) Léopold Club de Bruxelles
	DF	(Belgium) Raul Kelecom		0	0	(Royal Belgian Football Association) RFC Liégeois
	GK	(Belgium) Marcel Leboutte	11 May 1880 (aged 20)	0	0	(Royal Belgian Football Association) Spa FC
	FW	(Belgium) Lucien Londot	23 April 1874 (aged 26)	0	0	(Royal Belgian Football Association) RFC Liégeois
	DF	(Belgium) Ernest Moreau de Melen	20 February 1872 (aged 28)	0	0	(Royal Belgian Football Association) RFC Liégeois
	MF	(Belgium) Eugène Neefs		0	0	(Royal Belgian Football Association) Sporting Club de Louvain
	MF	(Belgium) Gustave Pelgrims (c)	14 June 1878 (aged 22)	0	0	(Royal Belgian Football Association) Léopold Club de Bruxelles
	MF	(Belgium) Alphonse Renier		0	0	(Royal Belgian Football Association) Racing Club de Bruxelles
	FW	(Belgium) Hilaire Spanoghe	30 October 1879 (aged 20)	0	1	(Royal Belgian Football Association) Skill F.C. de Bruxelles
	FW	(England) Eric Thornton	5 July 1882 (aged 18)	0	0	(Royal Belgian Football Association) Léopold Club de Bruxelles
	MF	(Belgium) Camille Van Hoorden	15 February 1879 (aged 21)	0	0	(Royal Belgian Football Association) Racing Club de Bruxelles
