= Alfred Bloch =

French footballer

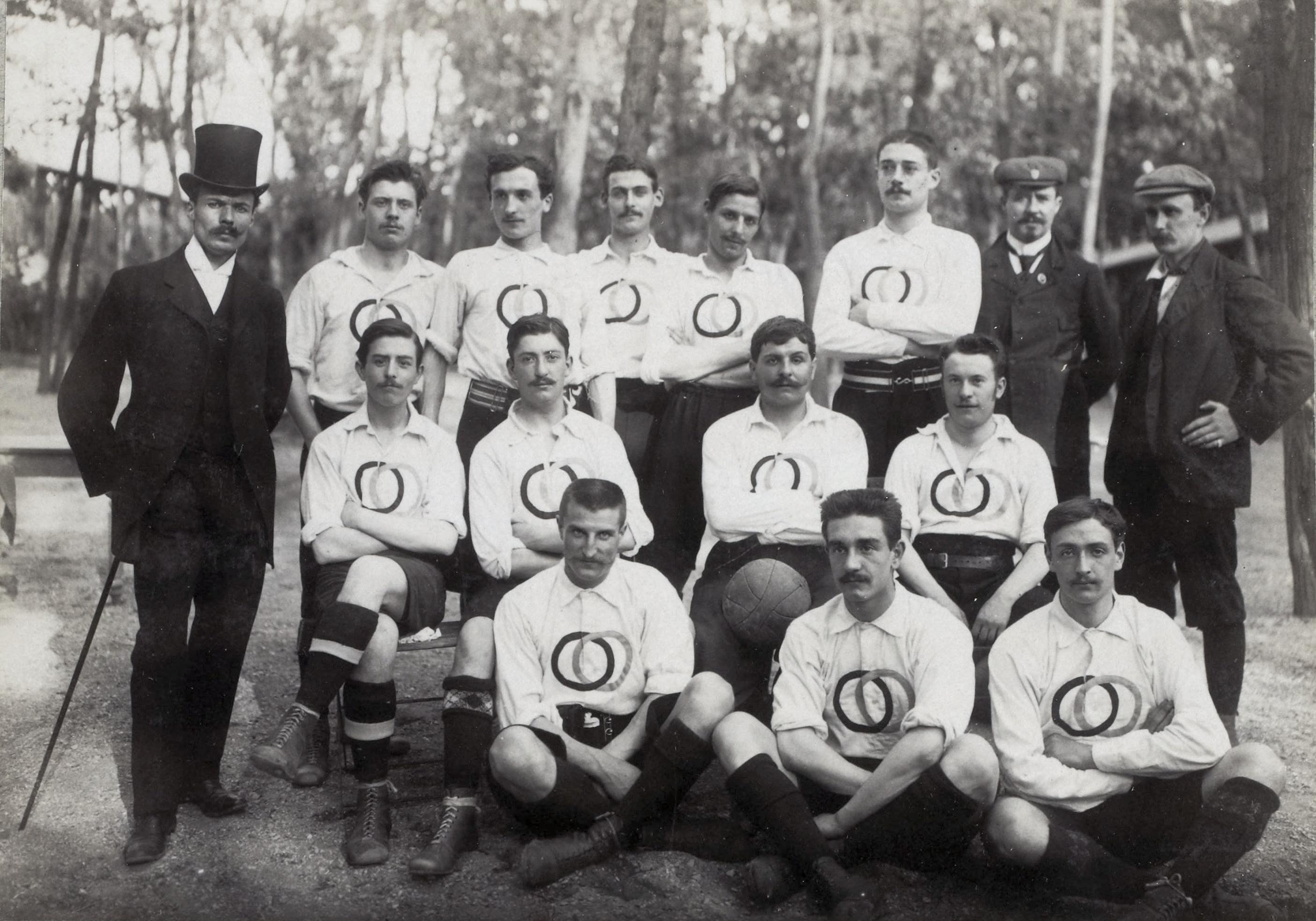
- Bloch (standing, third from the left) with the French team at the 1900 Olympics.

Personal information
- Full name: Alfred Bloch
- Date of birth: 22 February 1878
- Place of birth: Anvers, Belgium
- Date of death: 20 June 1902 (aged 24)
- Place of death: Paris, France
- Position: Defender

Senior career*
Years	Team	Apps	(Gls)
1895–1901	Club Français		

International career
1900	France (Olympic)	2	(+0)
Medal record
Men's football
Representing France
Football at the Summer Olympics
Silver medal – second place	1900 Paris	Team competition
- * Club domestic league appearances and goals

Alfred Bloch (22 February 1878 – 20 June 1902), also known as Jean Bloch and sometimes written Block, was a Belgian-born French footballer who played as a defender and who competed in the football tournament at the 1900 Olympic Games in Paris, winning a silver medal as a member of the USFSA Olympic team representing France, which was primarily made up of Club Français players. Bloch was Jewish.

== Playing career ==
=== Club career ===
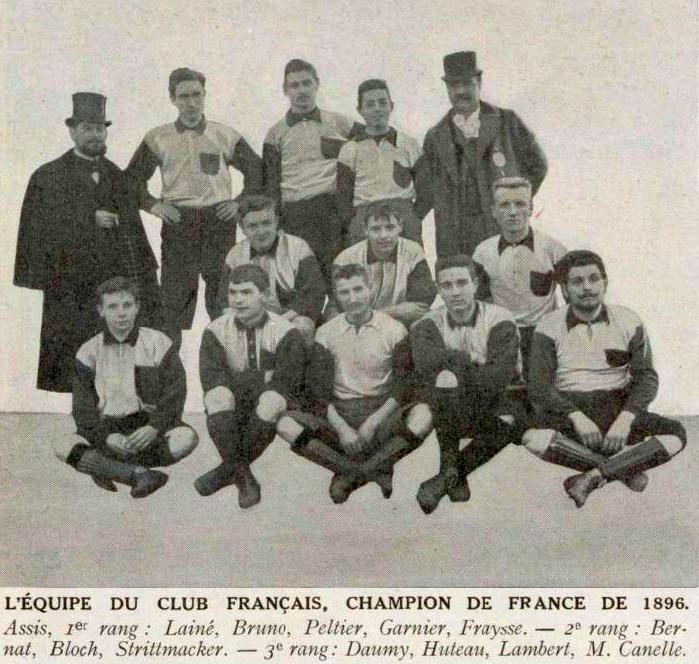
Bloch (2nd row, second from left) featured in the Club Français team that won the 1896 championship of France.

Together with Lucien Huteau, Marcel Lambert, Gaston Peltier, Georges Garnier, and captain Eugène Fraysse, Bloch was a starter in the Club Français team that won the 1896 USFSA Football Championship, doing so without losing a single match.

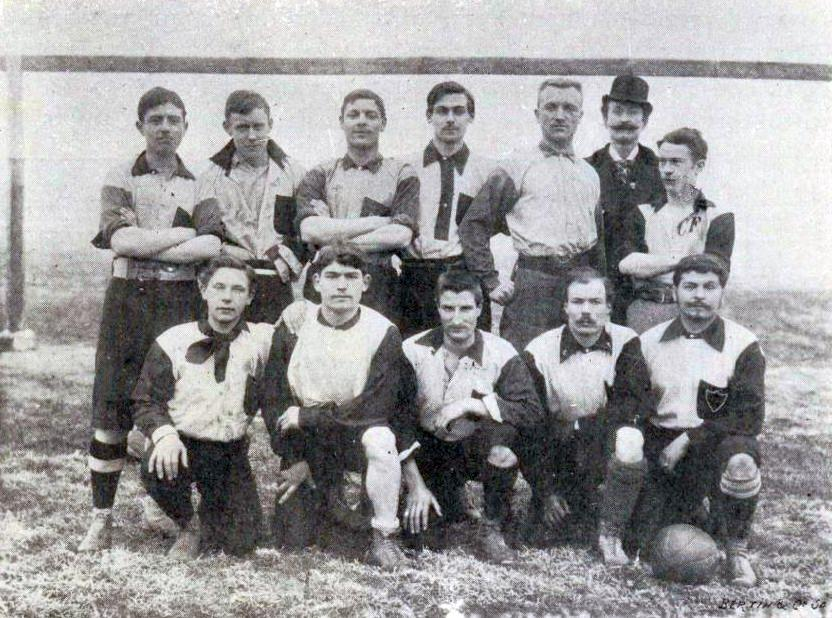
Bloch (standing, fourth from right) with Club Français at the Parc des Princes on 26 December 1897.

On 25 April 1897, Bloch started in the final of the inaugural Coupe Manier against the newly crowded champions of France Standard AC, helping his side to a 4–3 win after extra-time. A few months later, on 26 December, he started as a midfielder in the very first football match in the history of the Parc des Princes in front of 500 spectators, in which Club Français was defeated 1–3 by the English Ramblers. On 28 March 1898, he started in the 1898 Coupe Manier final at the Vélodrome de Vincennes, helping his side to a 10–0 win over Paris Star. In the following year, on 16 April 1899, Bloch started in the play-off match against Standard AC to decide the 1898–99 USFSA Paris championship, which ended in a 3–2 win. This victory qualified the club to the 1899 USFSA national championship, in which Club Français withdrew from the final before facing Le Havre AC.

Bloch was a member of the Club Français team that won the 1899–1900 USFSA Paris championship. On 6 May 1900, Bloch missed the final of the 1900 USFSA Football Championship against Le Havre AC, which ended in another loss to Le Havre AC (0–1), partly because Club Français' "defensive line was disorganized due to the absence of Bloch".

=== International career ===
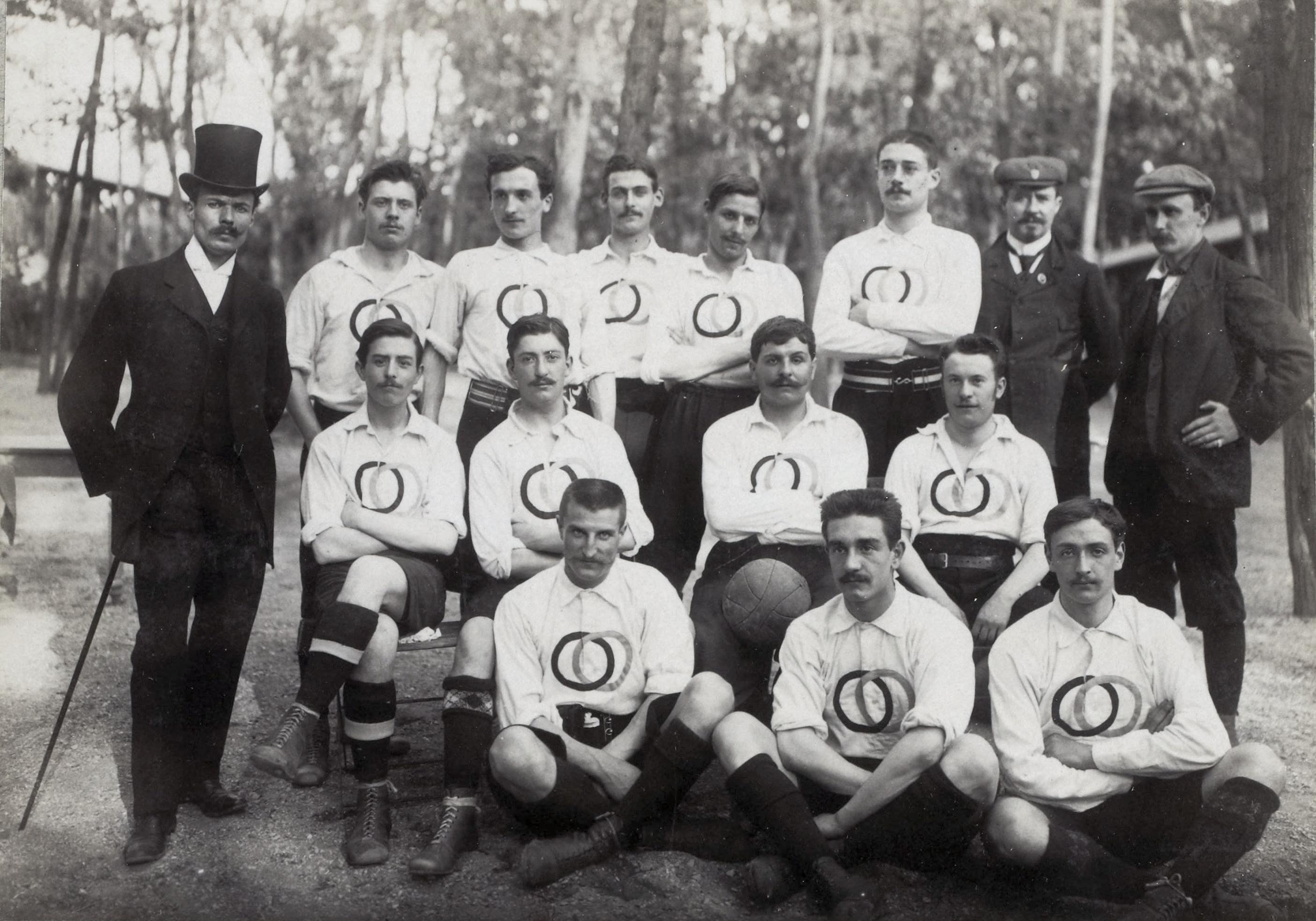
Bloch (standing, third from the left) with the French team at the 1900 Olympics.

Bloch was listed as a midfielder for the USFSA team at the 1900 Olympic Games. He was selected for both matches, which ended in a 0–4 loss to Upton Park on 20 September, and in a 6–2 win over a team representing Belgium three days later. The French team came second and Bloch was thus awarded with a silver medal.

== Death ==
Bloch died of meningitis in Paris on 20 June 1902, at the age of 24, and was buried in Antwerp. If the two matches played by the French team during the 1900 Olympic Games are considered, then he is the first French international to have died, eight years before Sadi Dastarac.

== Honours ==
=== Club ===
Club Français

- USFSA Paris Championship:
  - Champions (2): 1898–99 and 1899–1900
- USFSA Football Championship:
  - Runner-up (3): 1898, 1899 and 1900
- Coupe Manier:
  - Champions (4): 1898, 1899, 1900, and 1902
- Challenge International du Nord:
  - Runner-up (1): 1900

=== International ===
France MNT

- Summer Olympics:
  - Silver medal (1): 1900

== See also ==
- List of Jewish footballers
