= René Grandjean (footballer) =

French footballer

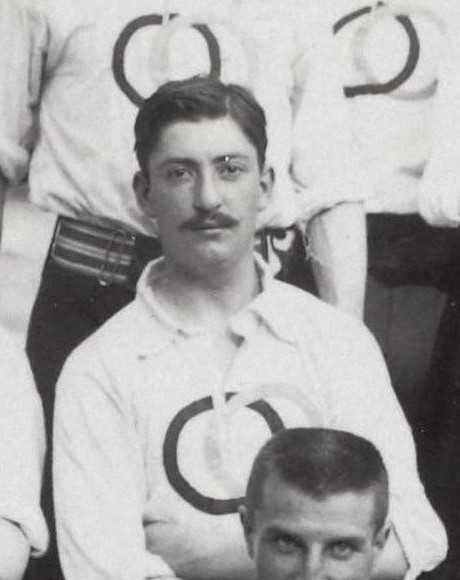
- Grandjean with the French team at the 1900 Olympics

Personal information
- Full name: René Grandjean
- Date of birth: 1881
- Place of birth: France
- Date of death: Unknown
- Place of death: France
- Position: Forward

Senior career*
Years	Team	Apps	(Gls)
1897–1905	Club Français		
1905–1909	AS Française		
1909–1911	CA Paris		
1911–1913	Club Français		

International career
1900	France MNT	1	(0)
Medal record
Men's football
Representing France
Football at the Summer Olympics
Silver medal – second place	1900 Paris	Team competition
- * Club domestic league appearances and goals

René Grandjean (1881 – unknown) was a French footballer who played as a Forward and who competed in the football tournament at the 1900 Olympic Games in Paris, winning a silver medal as a member of the USFSA Olympic team representing France, which was primarily made up of Club Français players.

== Playing career ==
=== Club career ===
Grandjean was born either in late 1881 or early 1882. On 26 December 1897, the 15-year-old Grandjean started in the very first football match in the history of the Parc des Princes as a last-minute replacement for Maurice Macaire; Club Français was defeated 1–3 by the English Ramblers. On 28 March 1898, Grandjean started in the 1898 Coupe Manier final at the Vélodrome de Vincennes, helping his side to a 10–0 win over Paris Star. In the following week, on 3 April, he started in the final of the 1898 USFSA Football Championship against Standard AC at Courbevoie, assisting Gaston Peltier's opening goal in an eventual 2–3 loss. In the following year, on 16 April 1899, he started in the play-off match against Standard AC to decide the 1898–99 USFSA Paris championship, which ended in a 3–2 win. This victory qualified the club to the 1899 USFSA national championship, in which Club Français withdrew from the final before facing Le Havre AC. Later that year, on 23 October, he started in the 1899 Coupe Manier final at Suresnes, helping his side to a 6–0 win over RC Roubaix.

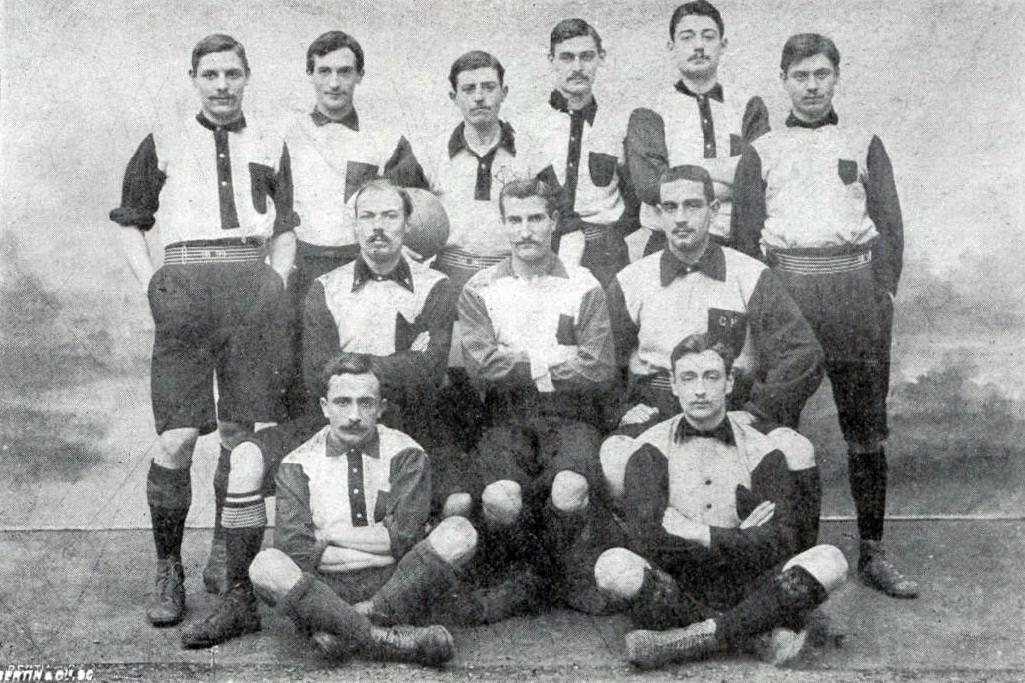
Grandjean (seating on the floor, left) with Club Français in 1899.

Together with Lucien Huteau, Georges Garnier, and Gaston Peltier, Grandjean was a member of the Club Français team that won the 1899–1900 USFSA Paris championship. On 29 April 1900, Peltier started in the 1900 Challenge International du Nord final in Tourcoing, which ended in a 2–3 loss to Le Havre AC. In the following week, on 6 May, he started in the 1900 USFSA Football Championship final against Le Havre AC, which ended in a 0–1 loss. Later that year, on 23 December, he started in the 1900 Coupe Manier final at Joinville, helping his side to a 1–0 win over UA I arrondissement.

Grandjean played for the AS Française in the 1905–06 and the 1907–08 seasons, winning the Coupe Manier in 1908, which that year was awarded to the team composed of at least eight French players with the highest ranking in the USFSA Paris championship. On 18 April 1909, Grandjean started as a midfielder in the final of the Coupe Dewar in 1909 at Stade de Charentonneau, which ended in a 0–5 loss to Gallia Club. In 1909, he moved to CA Paris, with whom he won the 1910 Coupe Dewar, scoring once in the final to help his side to a 3–1 win over Gallia Club.

In 1911, Grandjean returned to Club Français, starting in the club's opening match of the season against FC Rouen. He was still playing for Club Français as late as May 1913, aged 31. In the following year, on 14 April 1912, he started in the final of the 1912 Coupe Dewar at Colombes, and although he "did not compromise", CF still lost 1–3 to Racing Club de France.

== International career ==
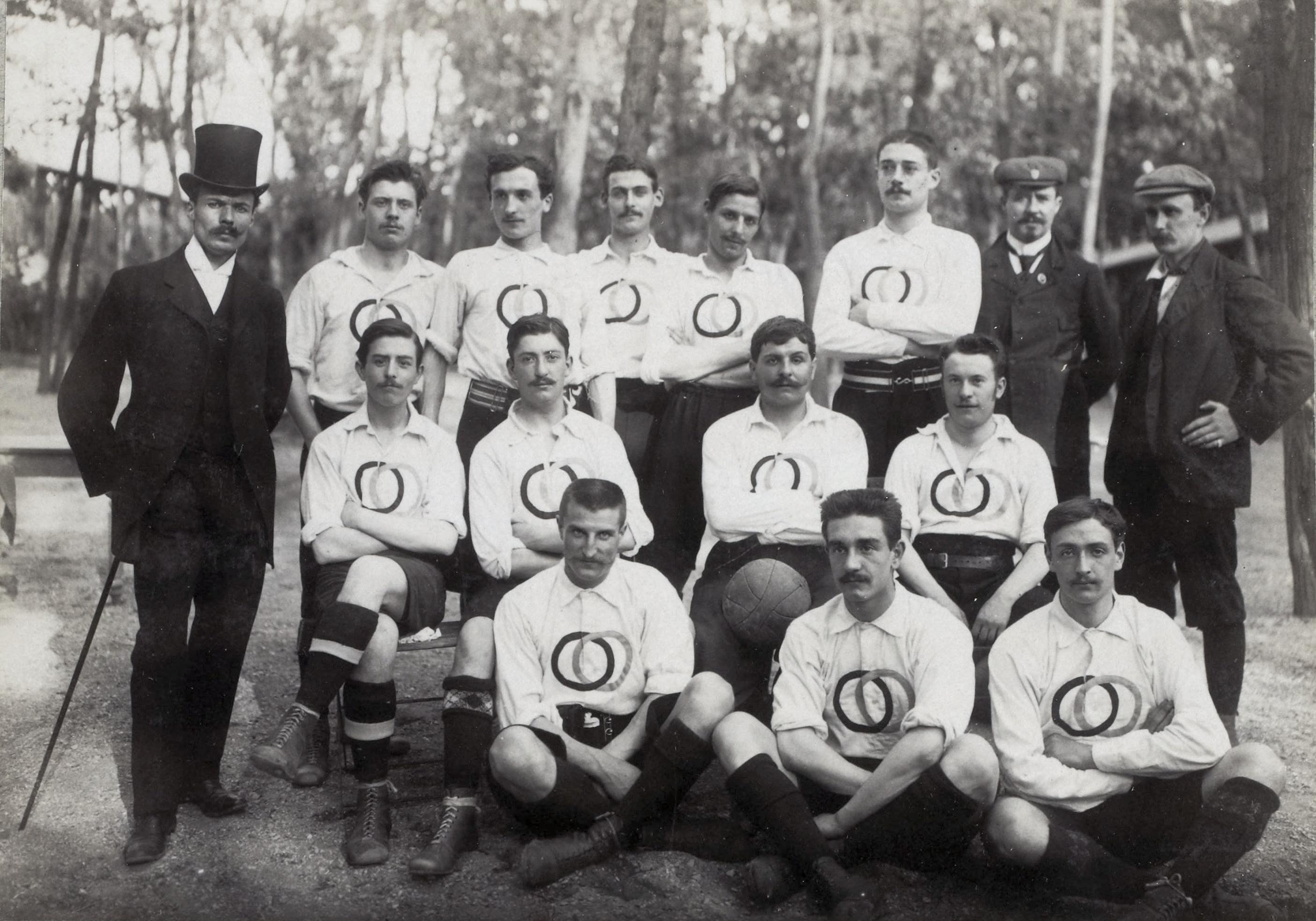
Grandjean (2nd row, second from the left) with the French team at the 1900 Olympics.

Grandjean was listed as a forward for the USFSA team at the 1900 Olympic Games. He was selected for the opening match against Upton Park on 20 September, which ended in a humiliating 0–4 loss, so he was not picked for the second match three days later, against a team representing Belgium. The French team came second and Grandjean was thus awarded with a silver medal.

== Honours ==
=== Club ===
Club Français

- USFSA Paris Championship:
  - Champions (2): 1898–99 and 1899–1900
- USFSA Football Championship:
  - Runner-up (3): 1898, 1899 and 1900
- Coupe Manier:
  - Champions (4): 1898, 1899, 1900, and 1902
- Challenge International du Nord:
  - Runner-up (1): 1900
- Coupe Dewar:
  - Runner-up (1): 1912

-

AS Française

- Coupe Manier:
  - Champions (1): 1908
- Coupe Dewar:
  - Runner-up (1): 1909

CA Paris

- Coupe Dewar:
  - Champions (1): 1910

=== International ===
France MNT

- Summer Olympics:
  - Silver medal (1): 1900
