= Louis Bach =

French footballer (1883-1914)

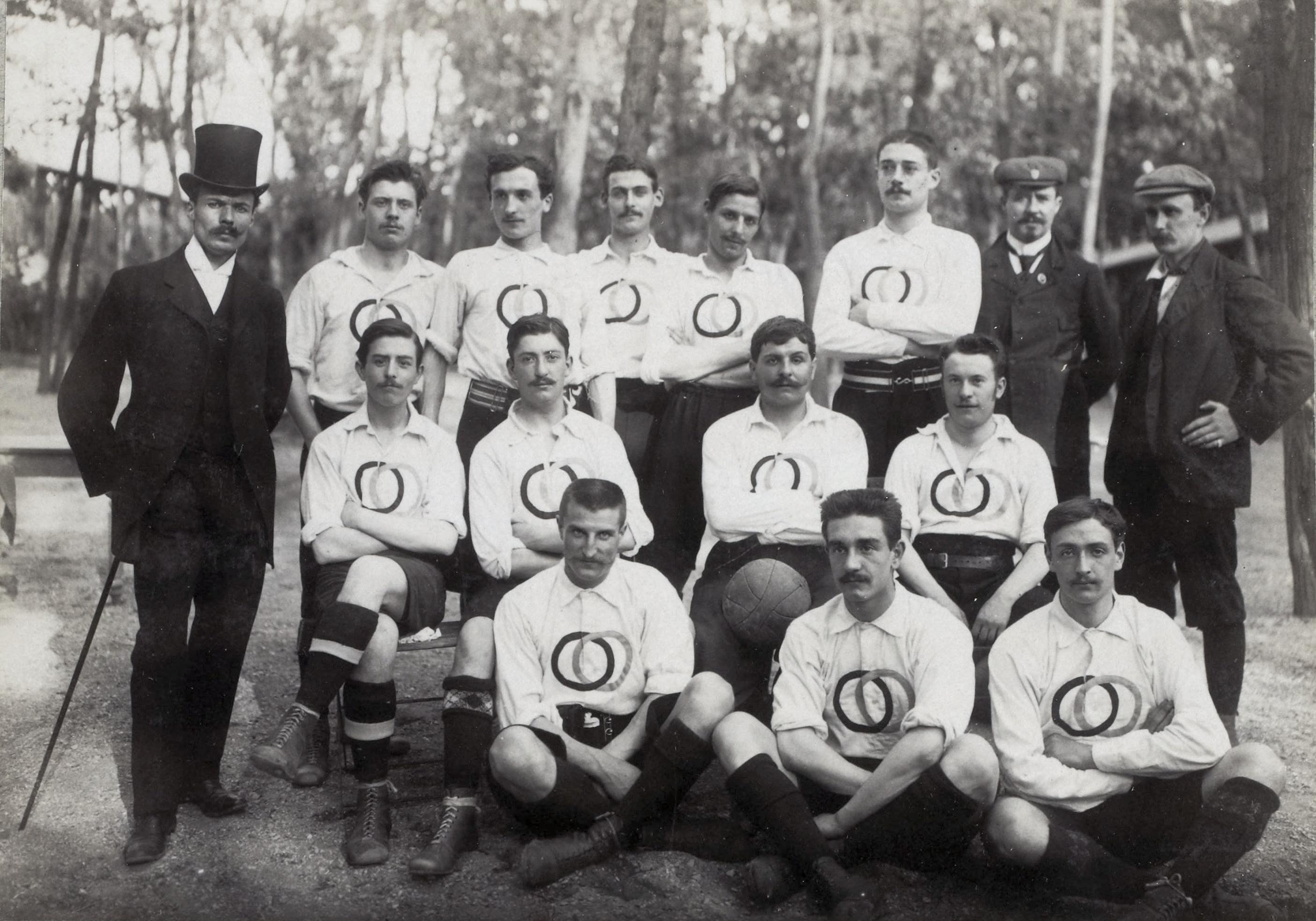
- Bach (standing, third from left) with the French team at the 1900 Olympics

Personal information
- Full name: Louis Désiré Bach
- Date of birth: 14 April 1883
- Place of birth: 10th arrondissement of Paris, France
- Date of death: 16 September 1914 (aged 31)
- Place of death: Servon-Melzicourt, Marne, France
- Position: Defender

Senior career*
Years	Team	Apps	(Gls)
1897–1901	Club Français		

International career
1900	France (Olympic)	2	(+0)
Medal record
Men's football
Representing France
Football at the Summer Olympics
Silver medal – second place	1900 Paris	Team competition
- * Club domestic league appearances and goals

Louis Désiré Bach (14 April 1883 – 16 September 1914) was a French footballer who played as a defender and who competed in the football tournament at the 1900 Olympic Games in Paris, winning a silver medal as a member of the USFSA Olympic team representing France, which was primarily made up of Club Français players.

== Playing career ==
=== Club career ===
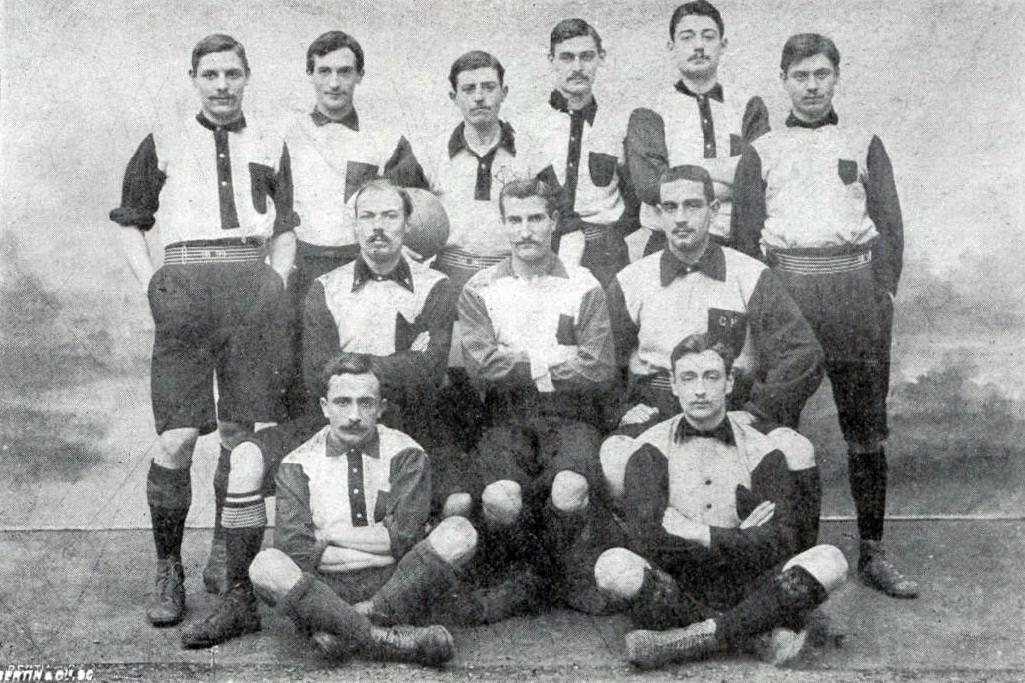
Bach (standing, third from the right) with Club Français in 1899.

Louis Bach was born in 10th arrondissement of Paris on 14 April 1883, and he began his football career at his hometown team, Club Français. On 23 October 1899, the 16-year-old Bach started in the 1899 Coupe Manier final at Suresnes, helping his side to a 6–0 win over RC Roubaix. Bach was a member of the Club Français team that won the 1899–1900 USFSA Paris championship.

Together with Lucien Huteau, Georges Garnier, and Gaston Peltier, Bach was a member of the Club Français team that won the 1899–1900 USFSA Paris championship. On 29 April 1900, he started in the final of the 1900 Challenge International du Nord in Tourcoing, which ended in a 2–3 loss to Le Havre AC. In the following week, on 6 May, he started in another final against Le Havre AC, this time in the 1900 USFSA Football Championship, and even though he "worked wonders after wonders", Club Français lost 0–1. Later that year, on 23 December, Bach formed a defensive partnership with Pierre Allemane in the 1900 Coupe Manier final at Joinville, keeping a clean-sheet in a 1–0 win over UA I arrondissement.

According to M.C.E. Reeves, the captain of the Norwood and Selhurst Football Club interviewed in October 1900, Bach was "one the best defenders he had watched playing".

== International career ==
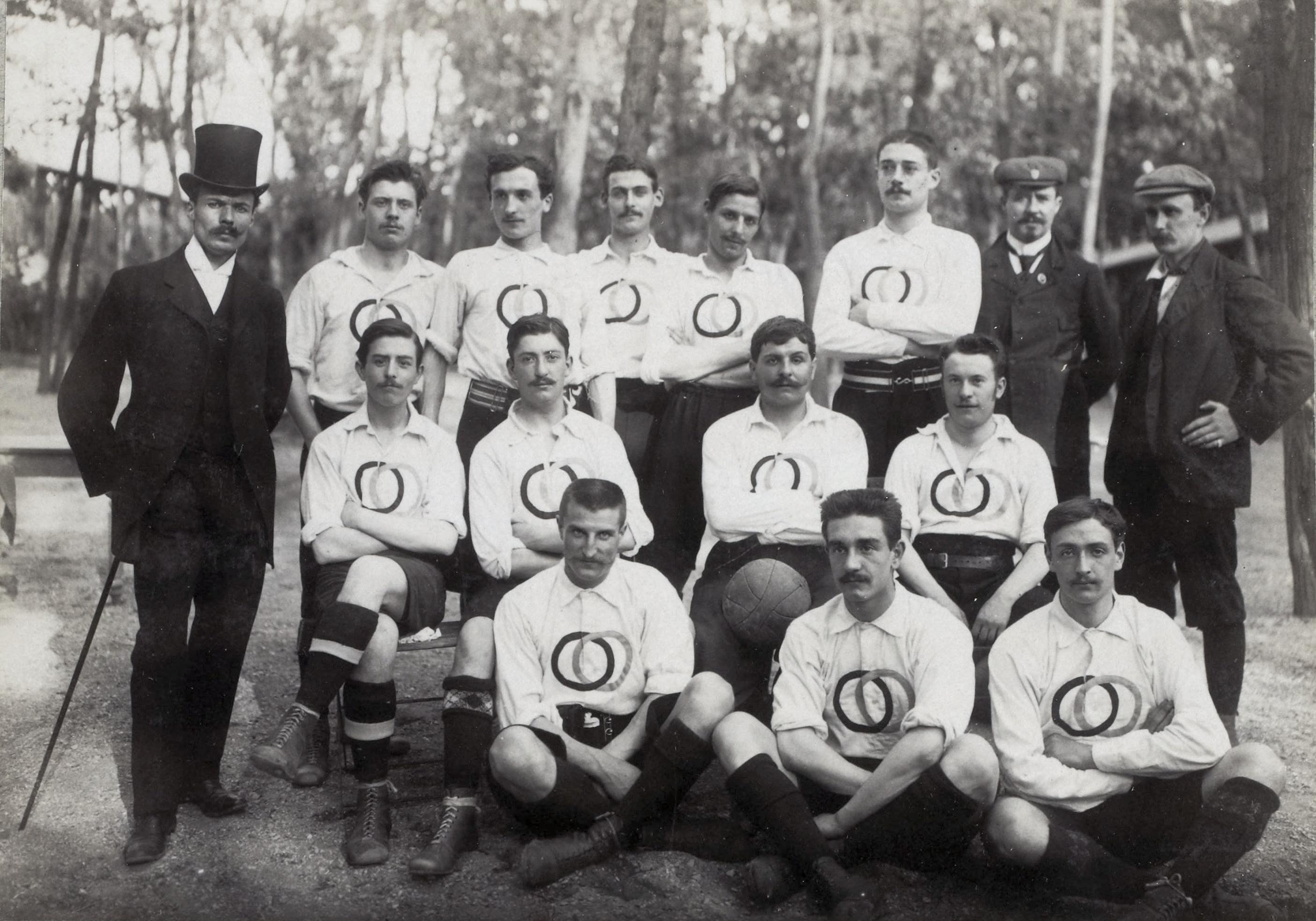
Bach (standing, third from left) with the French team at the 1900 Olympics.

Bach was listed as a defender for the USFSA team at the 1900 Olympic Games. Having just turned 17-years-old, Bach was the youngest member of the team. He was selected for both matches, which ended in a 0–4 loss to Upton Park on 20 September, and in a 6–2 win over a team representing Belgium three days later. The French team came second and Bach was thus awarded with a silver medal.

== Later life ==
Bach enlisted in the French Army in 1904, but left in 1906, although he stayed in the reserves. When the First World War broke out in August 1914, he was called up and joined his old regiment, the 128e Régiment d’Infanterie, being killed in action in Servon-Melzicourt, Marne, on 16 September 1914, at the age of 31, and was buried in the Nécropole Nationale de Saint-Thomas-en-Argonne.

== Honours ==
=== Club ===
Club Français

- USFSA Paris Championship:
  - Champions (1): 1899–1900
- USFSA Football Championship:
  - Runner-up (1): 1900
- Coupe Manier:
  - Champions (2): 1899 and 1900
- Challenge International du Nord:
  - Runner-up (1): 1900

=== International ===
France MNT

- Summer Olympics:
  - Silver medal (1): 1900

== See also ==
- List of Olympians killed in World War I
