= Maurice Macaire =

French footballer (born 1881)

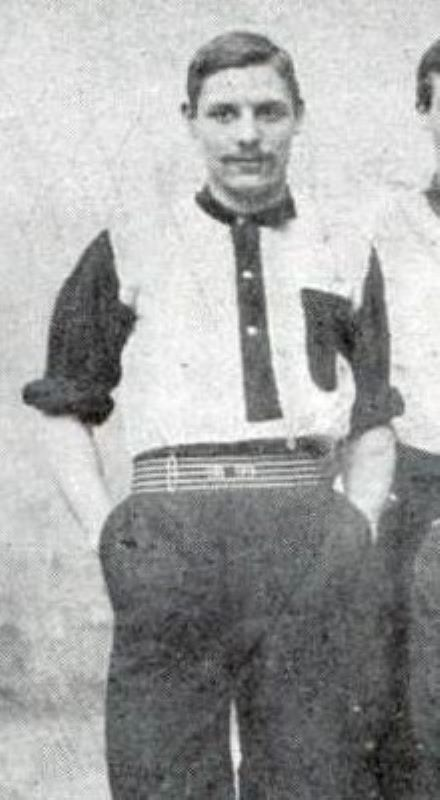
- Macaire in 1899

Personal information
- Full name: Maurice Macaire
- Date of birth: 22 November 1881
- Place of birth: 6th arrondissement of Paris, France
- Date of death: Unknown
- Place of death: France
- Position: Midfielder

Senior career*
Years	Team	Apps	(Gls)
1896–1900	Club Français		
1900–1901	Racing Club de France		

International career
1900	France (Olympic)	2	(+0)
Medal record
Men's football
Representing France
Football at the Summer Olympics
Silver medal – second place	1900 Paris	Team competition
- * Club domestic league appearances and goals

Maurice Macaire (22 November 1881 – unknown) was a French footballer who played as a midfielder and who competed in the football tournament at the 1900 Olympic Games in Paris, winning a silver medal as a member of the USFSA Olympic team representing France, which was primarily made up of Club Français players.

== Playing career ==
=== Club career ===
In October 1896, the 15-year-old Macaire was playing for the second team of Club Français. On 28 March 1898, Macaire started as a defender in the 1898 Coupe Manier final at the Vélodrome de Vincennes, helping his side to keep a clean-sheet in a 10–0 win over Paris Star. In the following year, on 23 October, he started in the 1899 Coupe Manier final at Suresnes, helping his side to a 6–0 win over RC Roubaix.

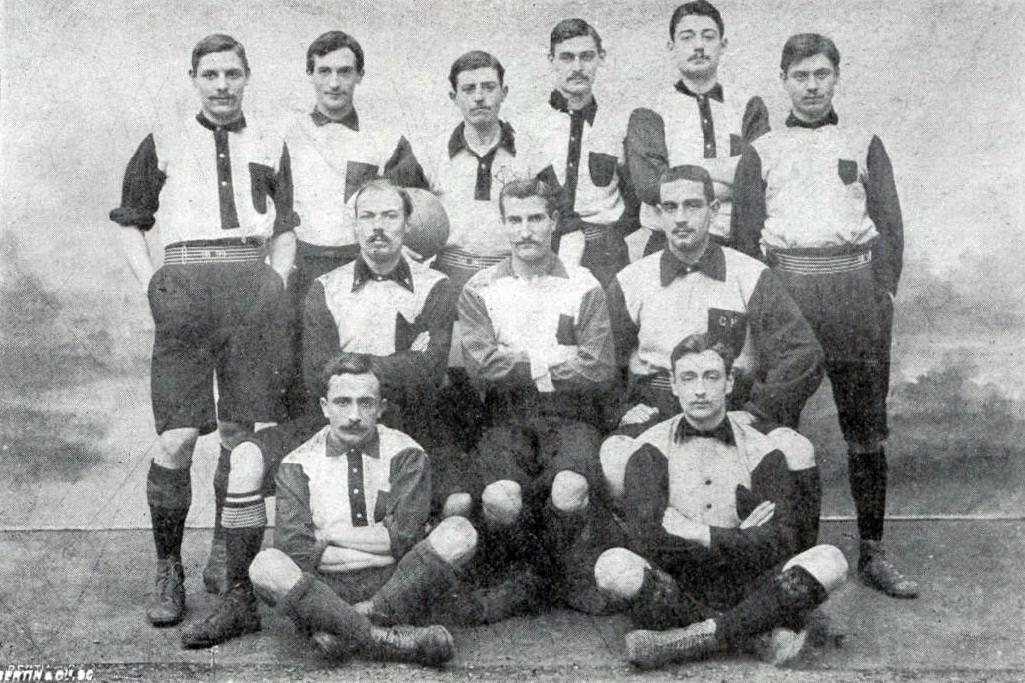
Macaire (standing, first from left) with Club Français in 1899.

Macaire was a member of the Club Français team that won the 1899–1900 USFSA Paris championship. On 29 April 1900, Macaire started in the final of the 1900 Challenge International du Nord in Tourcoing, which ended in a 2–3 loss to Le Havre AC. In the following week, on 6 May, he missed the 1900 USFSA Football Championship final, which ended in another loss to Le Havre AC (0–1), partly because Club Français' "defensive line was disorganized due to the absence of Macaire".

=== International career ===
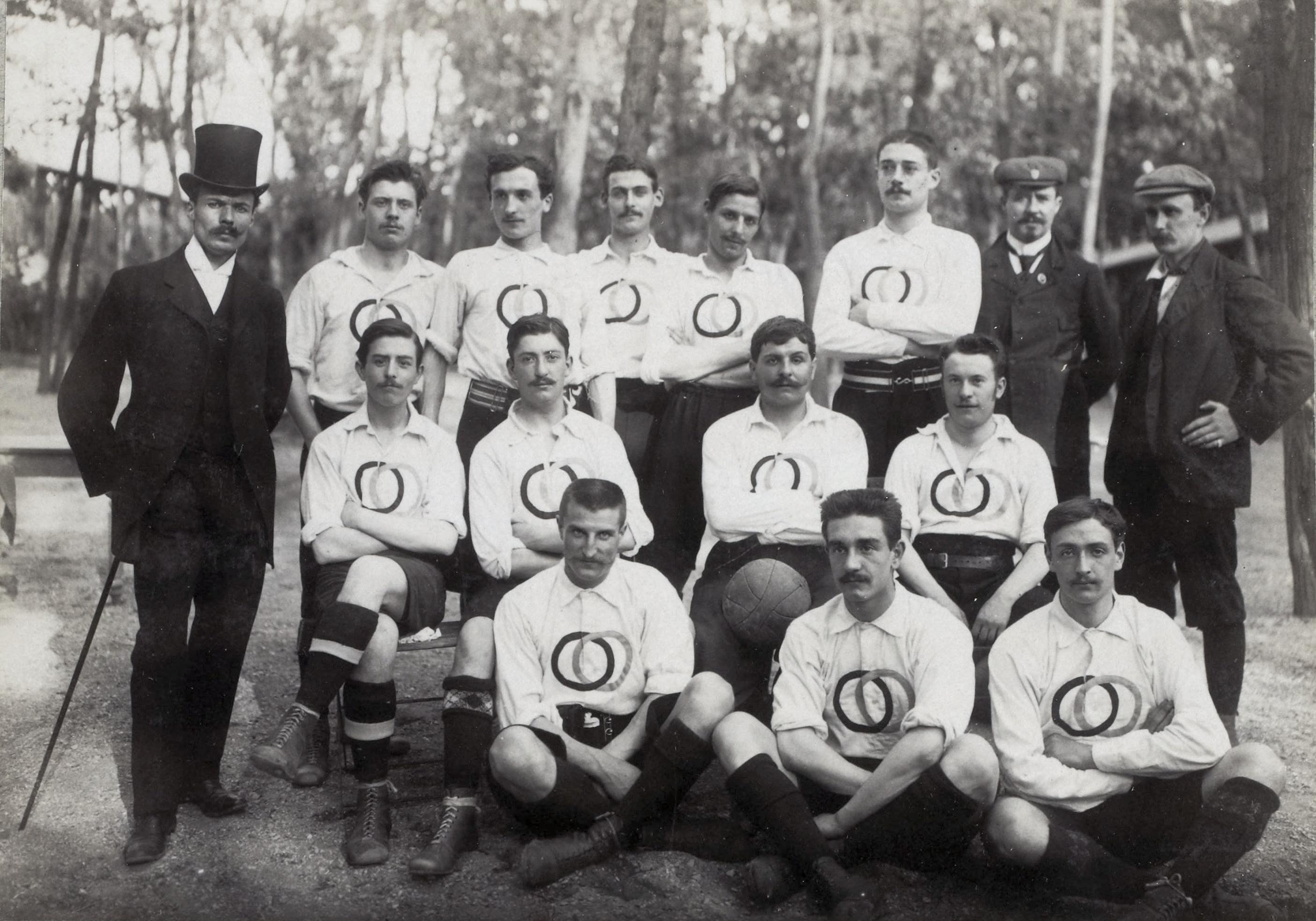
Macaire (standing, second from the right) with the French team at the 1900 Olympics.

Macaire was listed as a forward for the USFSA team at the 1900 Olympic Games. Together with Eugène Fraysse, Macaire was the only player in the squad that was not affiliated with Club Français, as both now played for Racing Club de France. He was selected for both matches, which ended in a 0–4 loss to Upton Park on 20 September, and in a 6–2 win over a team representing Belgium three days later. The French team came second and Macaire was thus awarded with a silver medal.

== Honours ==
=== Club ===
Club Français

- USFSA Paris Championship:
  - Champions (2): 1898–99 and 1899–1900
- USFSA Football Championship:
  - Runner-up (3): 1898, 1899 and 1900
- Coupe Manier:
  - Champions (4): 1898, 1899, 1900, and 1902
- Challenge International du Nord:
  - Runner-up (1): 1900

=== International ===
France MNT

- Summer Olympics:
  - Silver medal (1): 1900
