= Virgile Gaillard =

French footballer (born 1877)

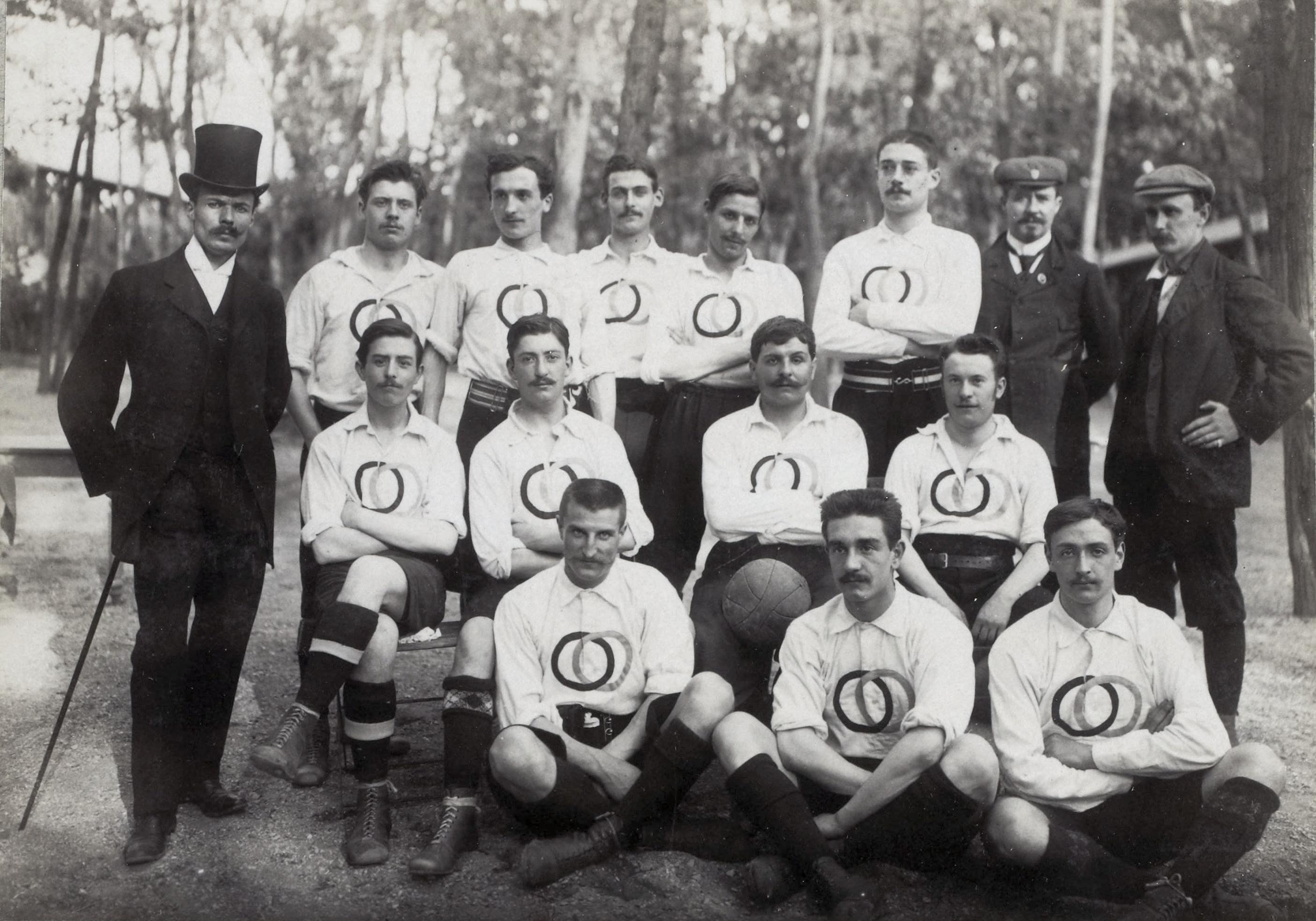
- Gaillard (2nd row, first from the right) with the French team at the 1900 Olympics.

Personal information
- Full name: René Paul Virgile Gaillard
- Date of birth: 28 July 1877
- Place of birth: 2nd arrondissement of Paris, France
- Date of death: 7 March 1943 (aged 65)
- Place of death: 18th arrondissement of Paris, France
- Position: Midfielder

Senior career*
Years	Team	Apps	(Gls)
1897–1901	Club Français		

International career
1900	France (Olympic)	2	(+0)
Medal record
Men's football
Representing France
Football at the Summer Olympics
Silver medal – second place	1900 Paris	Team competition
- * Club domestic league appearances and goals

René Paul Virgile Gaillard (28 July 1877 – 7 March 1943) was a French footballer who played as a midfielder and who competed in the football tournament at the 1900 Olympic Games in Paris, winning a silver medal as a member of the USFSA Olympic team representing France, which was primarily made up of Club Français players.

== Playing career ==
=== Club career ===
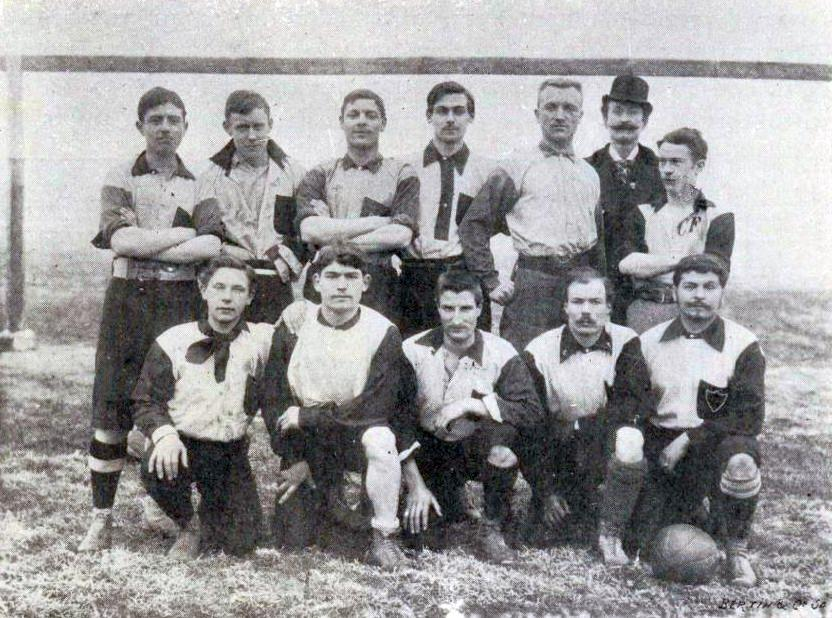
Gaillard (standing, first from right) with Club Français at the Parc des Princes on 26 December 1897.

On 25 April 1897, Gaillard started in the final of the inaugural Coupe Manier against the newly crowded champions of France Standard AC, helping his side to a 4–3 win after extra-time. A few months later, on 26 December, he started as a defender in the very first football match in the history of the Parc des Princes in front of 500 spectators, in which Club Français was defeated 1–3 by the English Ramblers. In the following year, on 3 April, he sustained an injury during the first half of the final of the 1898 USFSA Football Championship against Standard AC at Courbevoie, which affected his play for the rest of the game and contributed to the team's eventual 2–3 loss.

On 6 May 1900, Gaillard started in the final of the 1900 USFSA Football Championship against Le Havre AC, and even though he "worked wonders after wonders", Club Français lost 0–1. On 1 April 1907, the former players of Club Français, who had been retired for years, came together to play a match for the so-called Vieilles Gloires ("Old Glories"), including the 30-year-old Gaillard, who "left his rabbits and chickens to come and train, but ended up not playing due to injury.

=== International career ===
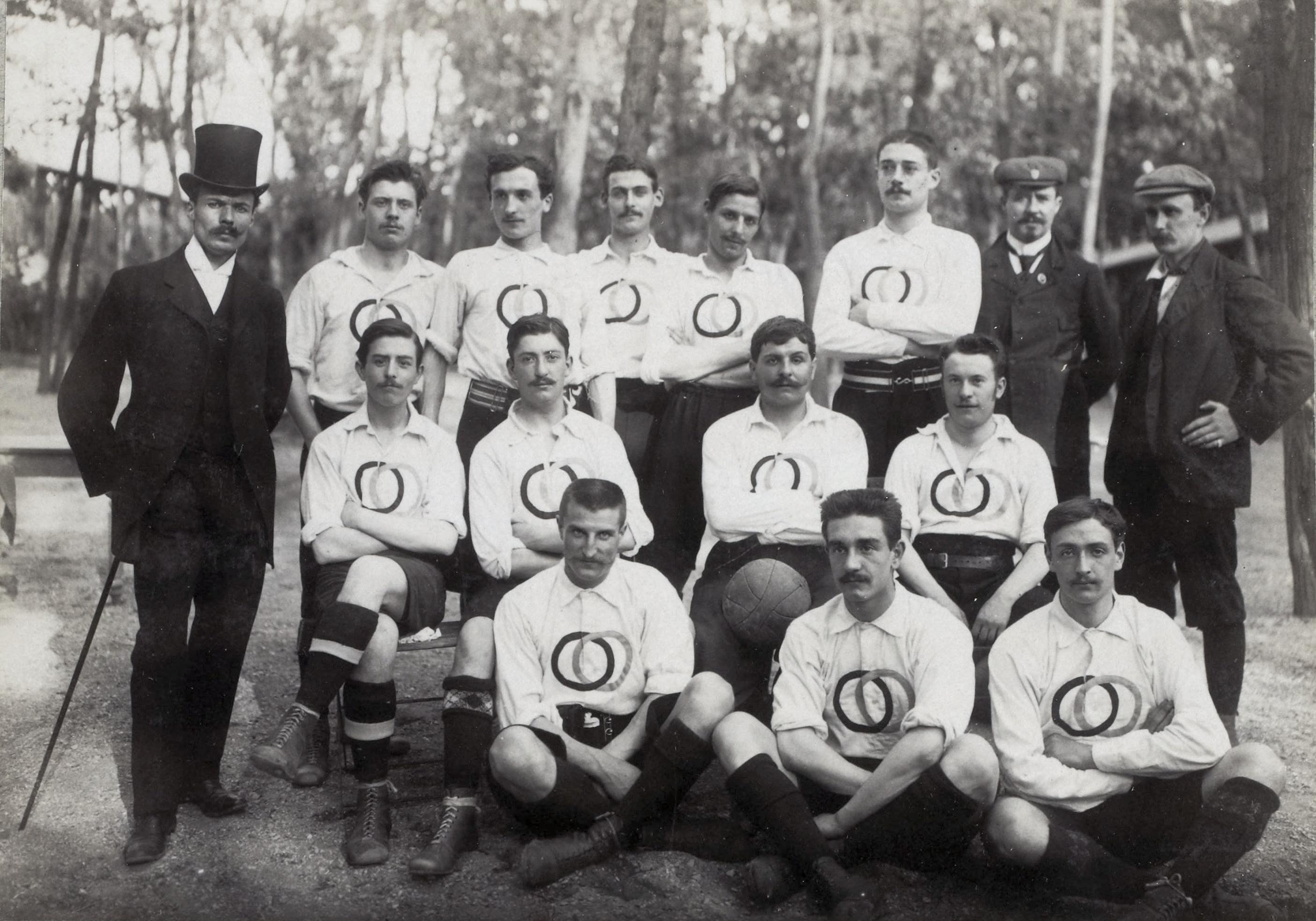
Gaillard (2nd row, first from the right) with the French team at the 1900 Olympics.

Gaillard was listed as a midfielder for the USFSA team at the 1900 Olympic Games. He was selected for both matches, which ended in a 0–4 loss to Upton Park on 20 September, and in a 6–2 win over a team representing Belgium three days later. The French team came second and Gaillard was thus awarded with a silver medal.

== Later life ==
Gaillard died in 18th arrondissement of Paris on 7 March 1943, at the age of 65.

== Honours ==
=== Club ===
Club Français

- USFSA Paris Championship:
  - Champions (2): 1898–99 and 1899–1900
- USFSA Football Championship:
  - Runner-up (3): 1898, 1899 and 1900
- Coupe Manier:
  - Champions (1): 1897

=== International ===
France MNT

- Summer Olympics:
  - Silver medal (1): 1900
