= Football at the 1900 Summer Olympics =

Tournament details
- Host country: France
- City: Paris
- Dates: 20–23 September
- Teams: 3
- Venue: 1 (in 1 host city)

Final positions
- Champions: (United Kingdom) Upton Park FC (1st title)
- Runners-up: (France) Club Français
- Third place: (Belgium) Université de Bruxelles

Tournament statistics
- Matches played: 2
- Goals scored: 12 (6 per match)

At the 1900 Summer Olympics, an association football tournament was contested for the first time. Only two matches were held between the three club sides, and no medals were awarded.

France's representatives were determined by the USFSA, which elected the Parisian champion Club Français. For Belgium, after Racing Club de Bruxelles declined to participate, a student selection with players from the Université libre de Bruxelles was sent by the Federation. The team was reinforced with a few non-students. English club Upton Park F.C. represented Great Britain.

The International Olympic Committee originally credited Great Britain, France and a "Mixed Team" with gold, silver and bronze medals, respectively, as part of its attempt to reconcile early Olympic Games with the modern award scheme. The Belgian team included one British and one Dutch player. In 2024 the bronze medal was reallocated to Belgium.

The football matches were held at the Vélodrome de Vincennes in Paris.

== Competition schedule ==
Originally there were four matches scheduled for the 1900 Olympics, all including a French team.

- 16 September 1900: France v. Switzerland
- 23 September: France v. Belgium
- 30 September: France v. Germany
- 7 October: France v. Great Britain

As Switzerland and Germany eventually did not send a team, the match involving France and Great Britain was moved forward to 20 September.

The final schedule of the tournament:

Legend
M	Match

Thu 20	Fri 21	Sat 22	Sun 23
M1			M2

== Venue ==
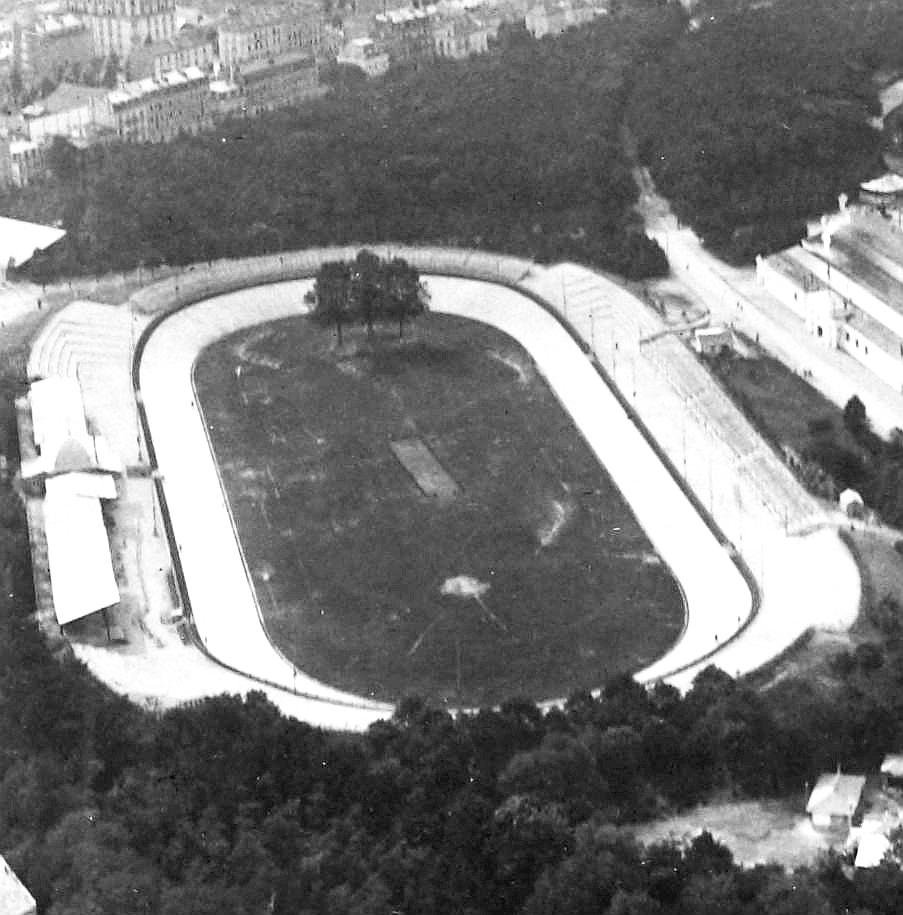
The Vélodrome de Vincennes, east of Paris, hosted both of the matches

== Matches ==
In the first match, the British squad had little difficulty defeating the Club Français (wearing the USFSA uniform). Upton Park led 2–0 after the first half, getting two more goals in the second to win 4–0. In the second match, Gaston Peltier scored in the first minute to give the USFSA XI an early lead, but Université de Bruxelles scored twice to take a 2–1 first half lead. The French scored five goals in the second half, however, to take the match 6–2.

20 September 1900

Club Français (France)	0–4	(United Kingdom) Upton Park FC
	Report	Nicholas (?); Turner 5'; Zealley 7'

Vélodrome de Vincennes, Paris
Attendance: 500
Referee: Maignard (France)

Team details

Club Français	Upton Park

GK	Lucien Huteau
RB	Louis Bach
LB	Pierre Allemane
RH	Virgile Gaillard
CH	Alfred Bloch
LH	Maurice Macaire
OR	Eugène Fraysse (capt.)
IR	René Garnier
CF	Marcel Lambert
IL	René Grandjean
OL	Fernand Canelle

GK	James Jones
RB	Claude Buckenham
LB	William Gosling
RH	Alfred Chalk
CH	T. E. Burridge
LH	William Quash
OR	Richard Turner
IR	F. G. Spackman
CF	John Nicholas
IL	Jack Zealley
OL	Henry Haslam (capt.)

23 September 1900

Club Français (France)	6–2	(Belgium) Université de Bruxelles
Peltier 1' (?); Lambert (?) ? (?)	Report	Spanoghe (?) van Heuckelum (?)

Vélodrome de Vincennes, Paris
Attendance: 1,500
Referee: Jack Wood (Great Britain)

Team details

Club Français	Université de Bruxelles

GK	Lucien Huteau
RB	Louis Bach
LB	Pierre Allemane
RH	Virgile Gaillard
CH	Alfred Bloch
LH	Maurice Macaire
OR	René Ressejac-Duparc
IR	René Garnier (capt.)
CF	Gaston Peltier
IL	Marcel Lambert
OL	Fernand Canelle

GK	(United Kingdom) Eric Thornton
RB	(Belgium) Marius Delbecque
LB	(Netherlands) Hendrik van Heuckelum
RH	(Belgium) Lucien Londot
CH	(Belgium) Ernest Moreau de Melen
LH	(Belgium) Raul Kelecom
OR	(Belgium) Eugène "Edmond" Neefs
IR	(Belgium) Camille Van Hoorden
CF	(Belgium) Gustave Pelgrims (capt.)
IL	(Belgium) Alphonse Renier
OL	(Belgium) Hilaire Spanoghe

=== Final ranking ===
Pos	Team	Pld	W	D	L	GF	GA	GD	Pts
1	(United Kingdom) Upton Park FC	1	1	0	0	4	0	+4	2
2	(France) Club Français	2	1	0	1	6	6	0	2
3	(Belgium) Université de Bruxelles	1	0	0	1	2	6	−4	0

== Medal summary ==
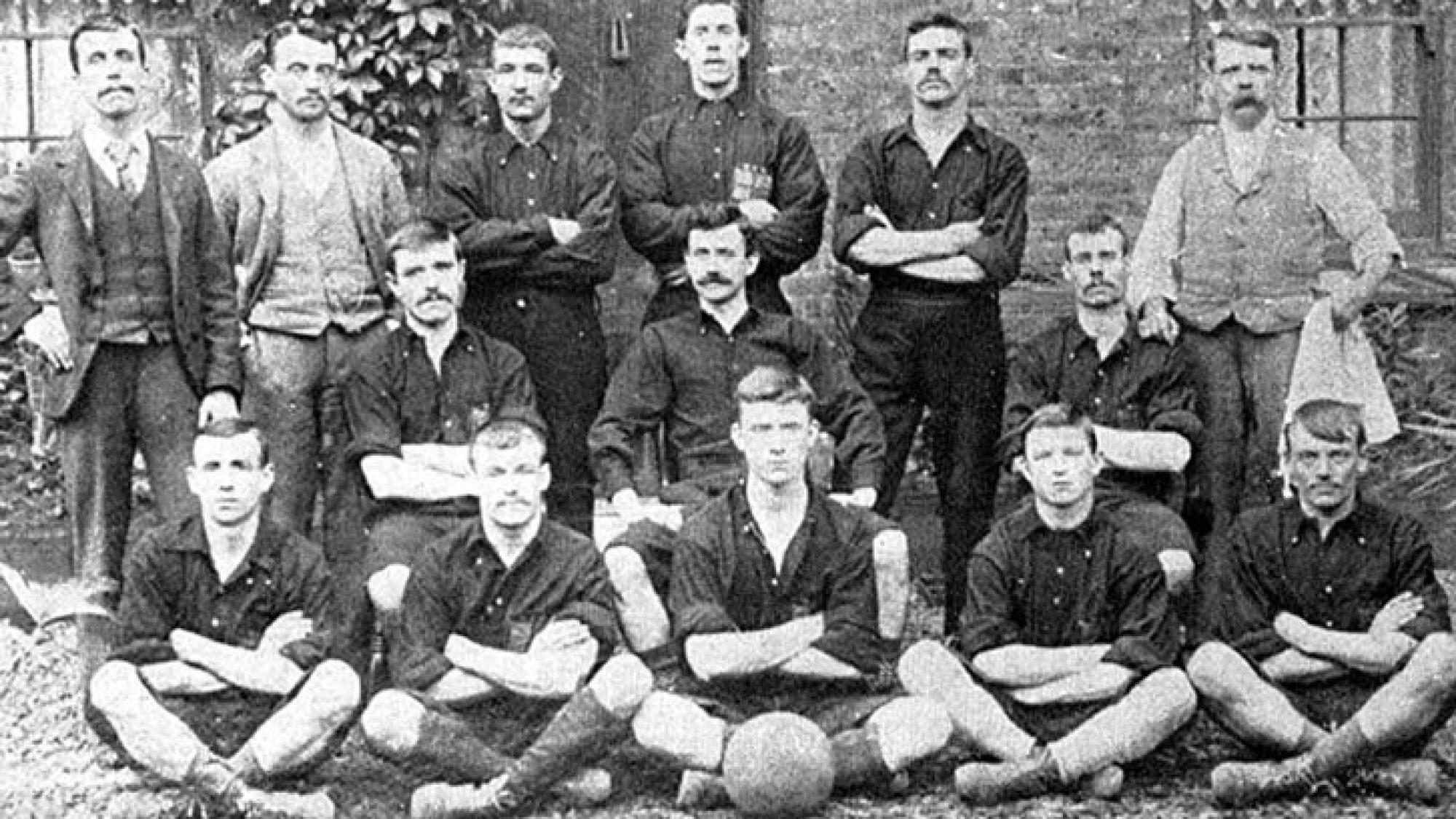
Upton Park F.C. (left) represented Great Britain, winning the Gold medal

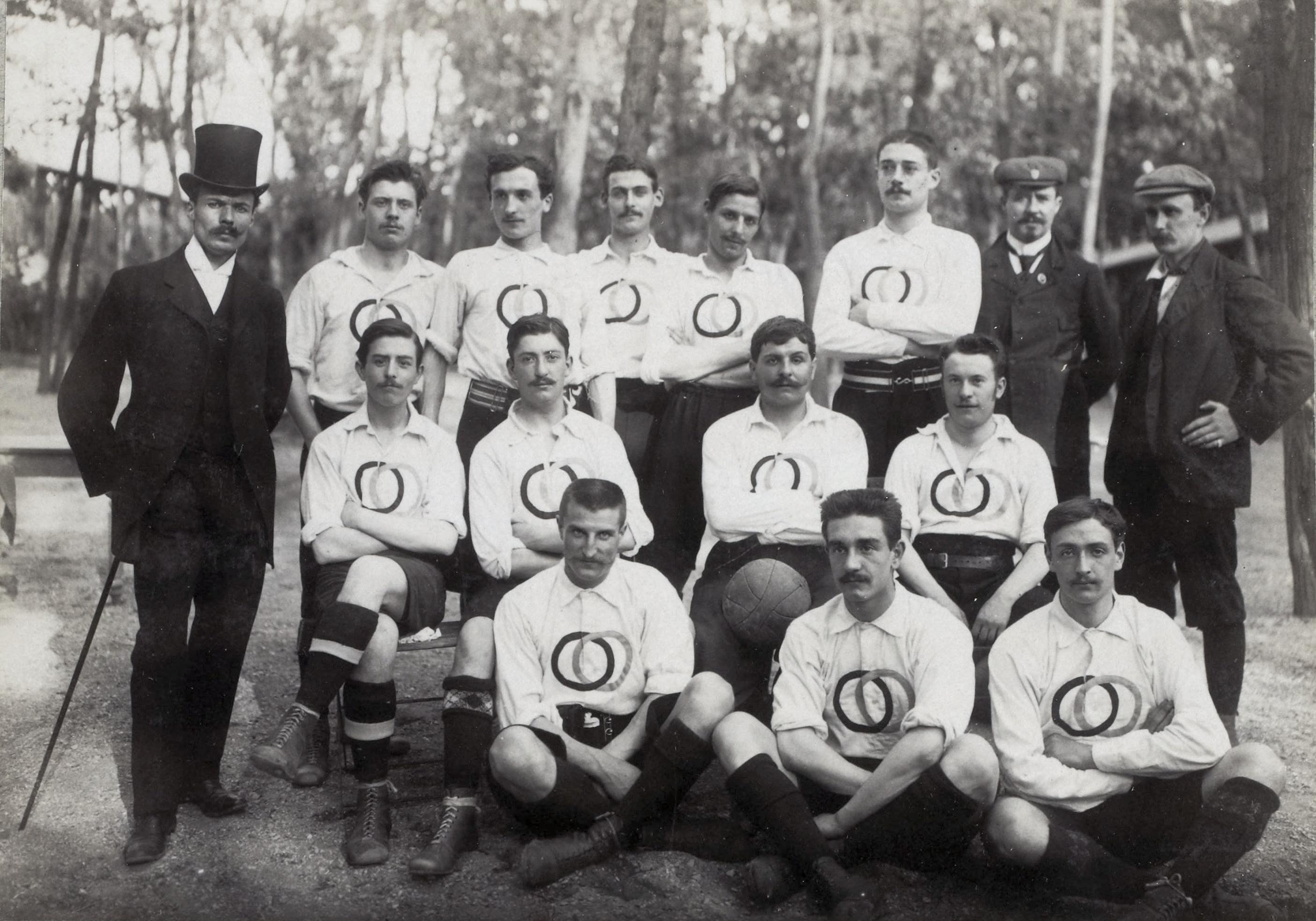
The French team was the Club Français wearing the USFSA uniform

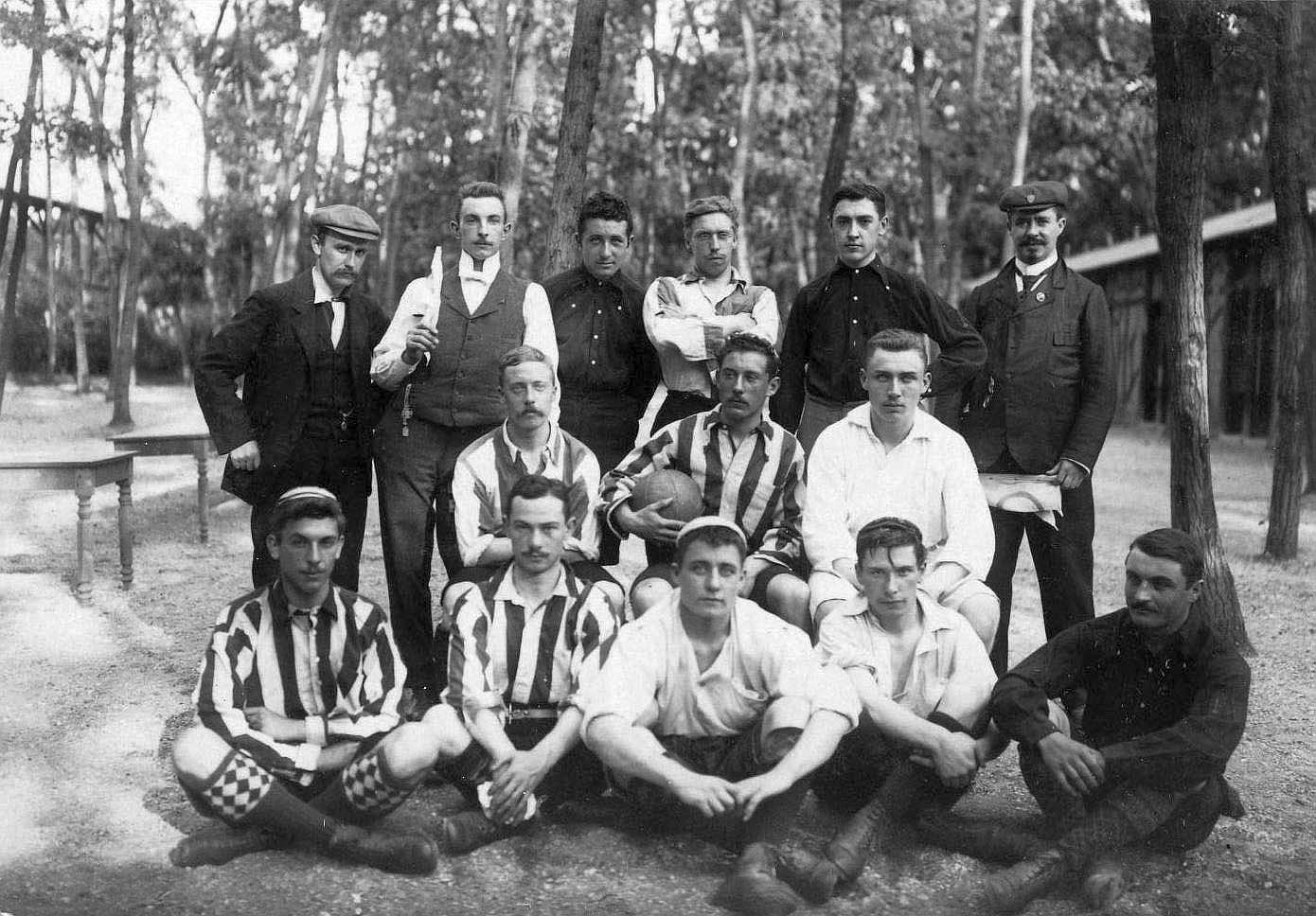
The Belgian team selected by the Université de Bruxelles

=== Medal table ===
* Host nation (France)

Rank	NOC	Gold	Silver	Bronze	Total
1	Great Britain	1	0	0	1
2	France*	0	1	0	1
3	Belgium	0	0	1	1
Totals (3 entries)		1	1	1	3

=== Medalists ===
Gold	Silver	Bronze
Great Britain (Upton Park FC); James Jones; Claude Buckenham; William Gosling; Alfred Chalk; Tom Burridge; William Quash; Richard Turner; Fred Spackman; John Nicholas; Jack Zealley; Henry Haslam	France (Club Français); Pierre Allemane; Louis Bach; Alfred Bloch; Fernand Canelle; René Ressejac-Duparc; Eugène Fraysse; Virgile Gaillard; Georges Garnier; René Grandjean; Lucien Huteau; Marcel Lambert; Maurice Macaine; Gaston Peltier	Belgium (Université de Bruxelles); Marius Delbecque; Hendrik van Heuckelum (NED); Raul Kelecom; Marcel Leboutte; Lucien Londot; Ernest Moreau de Melen; Eugène Neefs; Gustave Pelgrims; Alphonse Renier; Hilaire Spanoghe; Eric Thornton (GBR); Coach:Frank König (SWI)

== See also ==
- List of Olympic medalists in football
