= Gaston Peltier =

French footballer

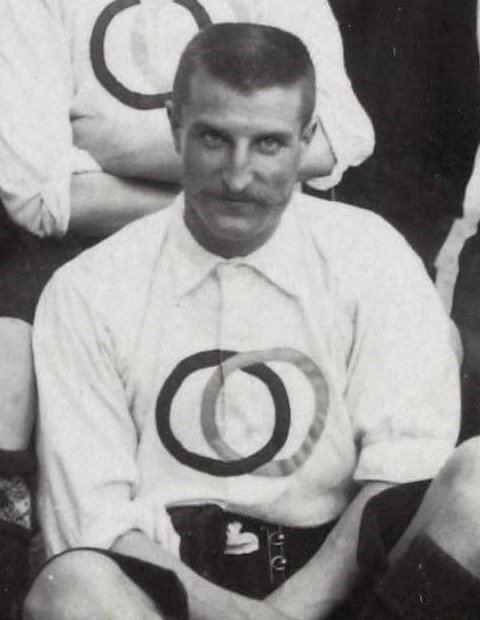
- Peltier in 1900

Personal information
- Full name: Gaston Peltier
- Date of birth: 2 August 1877
- Place of birth: Rouen, France
- Place of death: Bayonne, France
- Position: Forward

Senior career*
Years	Team	Apps	(Gls)
1895–1903	Club Français		
1900	Racing Club de France		

International career
1900	France (Olympic)	1	(2)
Medal record
Men's football
Representing France
Football at the Summer Olympics
Silver medal – second place	1900 Paris	Team competition
- * Club domestic league appearances and goals

Gaston Peltier (2 August 1877 – unknown) was a French footballer who played as a Forward and who competed in the football tournament at the 1900 Olympic Games in Paris, winning a silver medal as a member of the USFSA Olympic team representing France, which was primarily made up of Club Français players.

== Club career ==
=== Early career ===
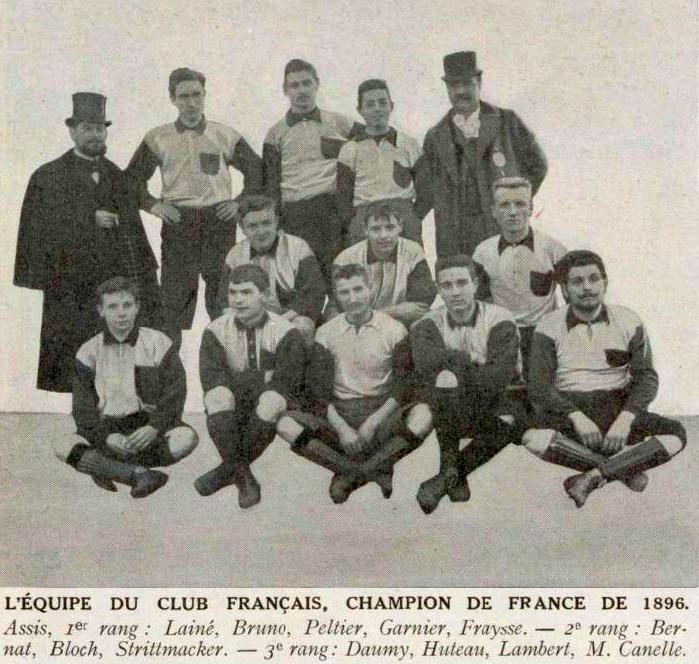
Peltier (seated on the floor, third from left) with Club Français in 1896.

In the semifinals of the inaugural USFSA championship between Club Français and The White Rovers, Peltier served as a linesman under referee Georges Caizac as Rovers won 1–0. Together with Lucien Huteau, Marcel Lambert, Georges Garnier, and captain Eugène Fraysse, Peltier was a starter in the Club Français team that won the 1896 USFSA Football Championship, doing so without losing a single match.

On 25 April 1897, Peltier started in the final of the inaugural Coupe Manier against the newly crowded champions of France Standard AC, helping his side to a 4–3 win after extra-time. A few months later, on 26 December, he started in the very first football match in the history of the Parc des Princes in front of 500 spectators, in which Club Français was defeated 1–3 by the English Ramblers. On 28 March 1898, Peltier started in the 1898 Coupe Manier final at the Vélodrome de Vincennes, helping his side to a 10–0 win over Paris Star. In the following week, on 3 April, he started in the final of the 1898 USFSA Football Championship against Standard AC at Courbevoie, scoring the opening goal in an eventual 2–3 loss.

=== National dominance ===
In the following year, on 16 April 1899, he started in the play-off match against Standard AC to decide the 1898–99 USFSA Paris championship, scoring his side's third goal in a 3–2 win. This victory qualified the club to the 1899 USFSA national championship, in which Club Français withdrew from the final before facing Le Havre AC. Later that year, on 23 October, Peltier started in the final of the 1899 Coupe Manier at Suresnes, scoring a first-half goal to help his side to a 6–0 win over RC Roubaix.

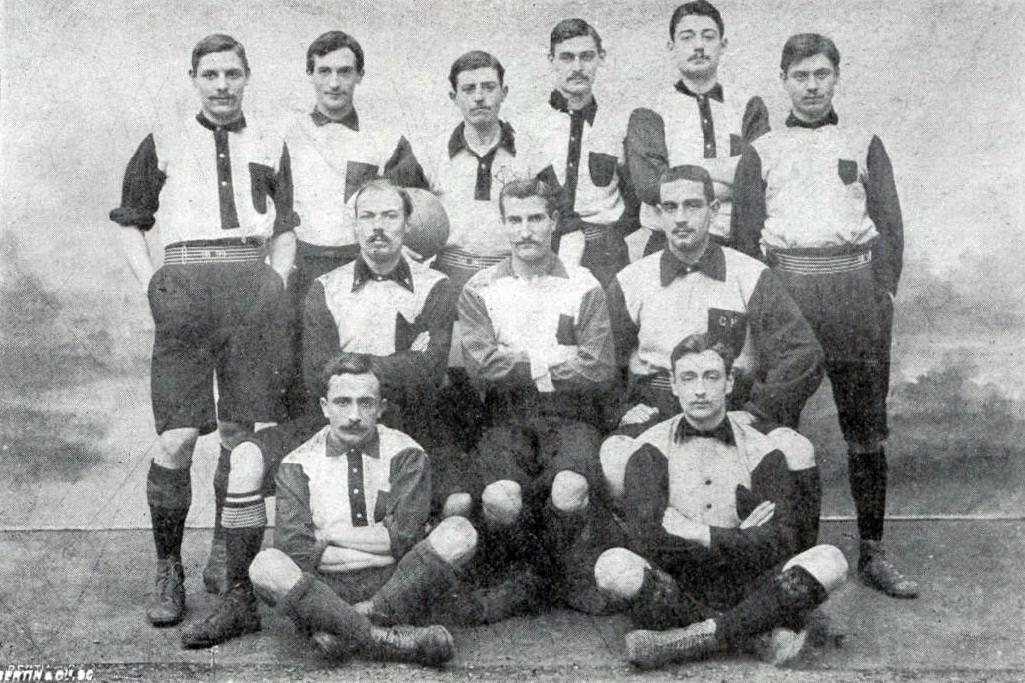
Peltier (2nd row, second from left) with Club Français in 1899.

Together with Lambert, Garnier, and Fernand Canelle, Peltier was a member of the Club Français team that won the 1899–1900 USFSA Paris championship. On 29 April 1900, Peltier started in the 1900 Challenge International du Nord final in Tourcoing, which ended in a 2–3 loss to Le Havre AC. In the following week, on 6 May, he started in the 1900 USFSA Football Championship final against Le Havre AC, which ended in a 0–1 loss; he had a good chance to equalize in the second half, but slipped and hit the post, and then he had three goals ruled offside, although the third was perfectly legal. Later that year, on 23 December, Peltier started in the 1900 Coupe Manier final against UA I arrondissement, in which Français played the entire first half with 10 men because of the absence of Laisné. At half-time, however, Peltier managed to discover a former CF player among the many spectators, Ernest Weber, thus playing with 11 men in the second half, in which he scored the only goal of the match to seal a 1–0 victory. The French newspaper L'Auto described this goal as Peltier dribbling "as only he knows how".

=== Later career ===
Peltier played as a striker for Club Français and then Racing Club de France. On 4 January 1903, Peltier started in the final of the 1902 Coupe Manier at Le Vésinet, scoring once and assisting an own goal to help his side to a 7–0 win over Olympique Lillois. On 15 March 1903, he started in the final of the 1903 Coupe Dewar against United SC, but despite scoring twice, CF still lost 3–4.

On 1 April 1907, the former players of Club Français, who had been retired for years, came together to play a match for the so-called Vieilles Gloires ("Old Glories"), but the 30-year-old Peltier was injured, so he refused to attend the match "because he would have been upset not to be able to take part in it".

== International career ==
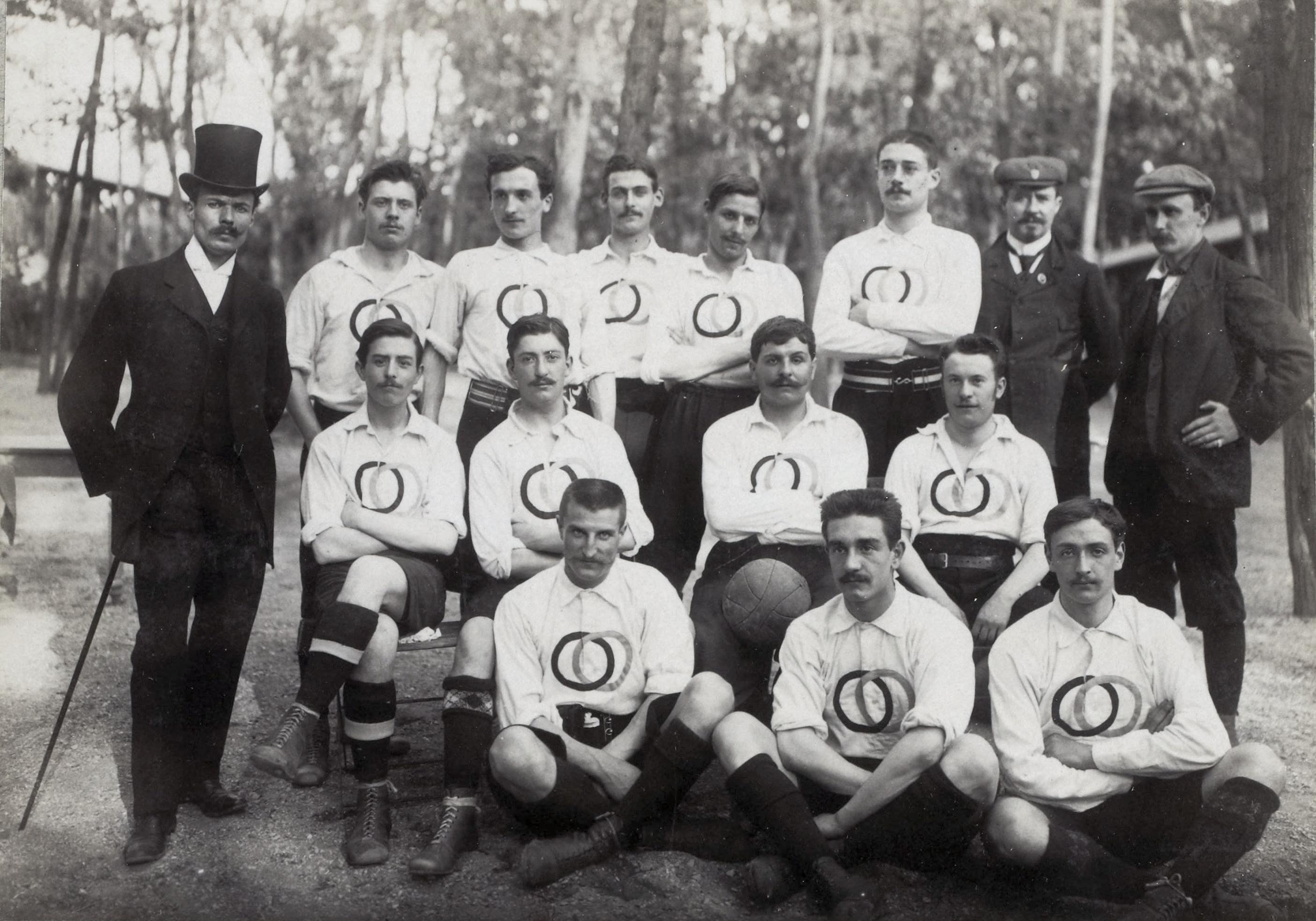
Peltier (seated on the floor, first from left) with the French team at the 1900 Olympics.

The French champions in 1899 and 1900, Havre AC, were not willing to participate, so the USFSA asked for the runners-up Club Français to participate, possibly to also attract more spectators and keep down expenses, and the three guest players were Peltier, Eugène Fraysse, and René Ressejac-Duparc of Racing Club de France. Peltier was listed as a forward for the USFSA team at the 1900 Olympic Games.

Peltier was not selected for the opening match against Upton Park on 20 September, which ended in a humiliating 0–4 loss, so he was then picked up for the second match three days later, scoring twice to help his side to a 6–2 victory over Belgium, which was mostly made up of students from the French-speaking Université libre de Bruxelles. The French team came second and Peltier was thus awarded with a silver medal. With two goals, Peltier was the joint top scorer of the tournament alongside Britain's John Nicholas.

== Later life and death ==
Peltier fought in the First World War, during which he was poisoned by a gas shell; he was decorated with the Croix de guerre (1914–1918).

== Honours ==
=== Club ===
Club Français

- USFSA Paris Championship:
  - Champions (2): 1898–99 and 1899–1900
- USFSA Football Championship:
  - Champions (1): 1896
  - Runner-up (3): 1898, 1899 and 1900
- Coupe Manier:
  - Champions (4): 1898, 1899, 1900, and 1902
- Challenge International du Nord:
  - Runner-up (1): 1900
- Coupe Dewar:
  - Runner-up (1): 1903

=== International ===
France MNT

- Summer Olympics:
  - Silver medal (1): 1900

== Bibliography ==
- Gachet, Stéphane (2023). JO d'été: tous les médaillés français de 1896 à nos jours [Summer Olympics: all the French medalists from 1896 to the present day] (in French). Paris: Talent Sport. ISBN 9782378153427.
