= Conrad Warner =

English footballer

Personal information
- Date of birth: 14 April 1850
- Place of birth: Cripplegate, England
- Date of death: 10 April 1890 (aged 39)
- Place of death: New York City, United States
- Position: Goalkeeper

Senior career*
Years	Team	Apps	(Gls)
- Upton Park

International career
1878	England	1	(0)
- * Club domestic league appearances and goals

Conrad Warner (14 April 1850 – 10 April 1890) was an English international footballer, who played as a goalkeeper.

== Career ==
Born in Cripplegate, Warner played for Upton Park, and earned one cap for England in 1878.
