= Servon-Melzicourt =

- Commune
- Location of Servon-Melzicourt
- Location within France Location within Grand Est
- Coordinates: 49°12′57″N 4°50′29″E
- Country: France
- Region: Grand Est
- Department: Marne
- Arrondissement: Châlons-en-Champagne
- Canton: Argonne Suippe et Vesle
- Intercommunality: Argonne Champenoise

Government
  - Mayor (2020–2026): Gauthier Guyot
- Area^{1}: 25.78 km^{2} (9.95 sq mi)
- Elevation: 119 m (390 ft)
- Population (2023): 87
  - Density: 3.4/km^{2} (8.7/sq mi)
- Time zone: UTC+01:00 (CET)
  - Summer (DST): UTC+02:00 (CEST)
- INSEE/Postal code: 51533 /51800
- ^{1} French Land Register data, which excludes lakes, ponds, glaciers > 1 km^{2} (0.386 sq mi or 247 acres) and river estuaries.

Servon-Melzicourt (French pronunciation: [sɛʁvɔ̃ mɛlzikuʁ]) is a commune in the Marne department in north-eastern France.

== See also ==
- Communes of the Marne department
