= Hilaire Spanoghe =

Belgian footballer

Personal information
- Full name: Hilaire Frederik Spanoghe
- Date of birth: 30 October 1879
- Place of birth: Grimbergen, Belgium
- Date of death: Unknown
- Position: Forward

Senior career*
Years	Team	Apps	(Gls)
1899–1902	Brussels Skill FC		
1902–1903	Athletic and Running Club		

International career
1900	Belgium Olympic	1	(1)
Medal record
Men's football
Representing Belgium
Bronze medal – third place	1900 Paris	Team competition
- * Club domestic league appearances and goals

Hilaire Frederik Spanoghe (born 30 October 1879, date of death unknown) was a Belgian footballer who competed in the 1900 Olympic Games. In Paris he won a bronze medal as a member of a mixed team representing Belgium that was mostly made-up of students from the Université de Bruxelles.

== Biography ==
Born in Grimbergen to Maria Victoria Van Bogaert (1837) and Amandus Spanoghe (1836), he is the only boy among the couple's five children and the youngest of his siblings. In 1899 he joined Brussels Skill FC, and he stayed loyal to the club until it merged with Daring Club de Bruxelles in 1902, joining Athletic and Running Club de Bruxelles shortly after.

He represented the Belgium Olympic at the 1900 Summer Olympics, featuring in the team's only games at the tournament against Club Français, in which he scored a consolation goal in a 2-6 loss.

== Honours ==
=== International ===
Belgium Olympic

- Summer Olympics:
  - Bronze medal (1): 1900
