= Richard Turner (footballer, born 1882) =

English footballer

Olympic medal record

Men's football

Representing Great Britain
Gold medal – first place	1900 Paris	Team competition

Richard Rennie Turner (24 April 1882 in Hornsey – 1 December 1960 in Worthing) was a British footballer who won a gold medal at the 1900 Summer Olympics as part of the Upton Park club side. Turner was an outside-right with Crouch End Vampires who joined Upton Park solely for the period of the Olympics. He scored one goal against the USFSA team.

== Sources ==
- Ian Buchanan, British Olympians, Guinness, London, 1991.
