= James Jones (footballer, born 1873) =

British footballer

Personal information
- Full name: James Henry Jones
- Date of birth: 18 November 1873
- Place of birth: Camberwell, London, England
- Date of death: 27 December 1955 (aged 82)
- Place of death: Hove, Sussex, England
- Position: Goalkeeper

Senior career*
Years	Team	Apps	(Gls)
- Upton Park

International career
1900	Great Britain	1	(0)
Medal record
Men's football
Representing Great Britain
Gold medal – first place	1900 Paris	Team competition
- * Club domestic league appearances and goals

James Henry Jones (18 November 1873 – 27 December 1955) was a British footballer who competed in the 1900 Olympic Games, playing in one match as a goalkeeper, and winning a gold medal.

He was the secretary of Upton Park F.C., a London-based amateur football team. The team were invited to participate in the 1900 Summer Olympics by the Amateur Status Committee of the Football Association. Upton Park won the tournament with a 4–0 victory over the French representative USFSA.
