= Henry Haslam (footballer) =

English footballer

Personal information
- Full name: Henry North Haslam
- Date of birth: 5 June 1879
- Place of birth: Worksop, Nottinghamshire, England
- Date of death: 13 October 1942 (aged 63)
- Place of death: Nottingham, England
- Height: 5 ft 3 in (1.60 m)
- Position: Outside left

Senior career*
Years	Team	Apps	(Gls)
- Worksop
- Tonbridge
- Tunbridge Wells
- Upton Park
- Barnet
- West Norwood

International career
1900	Great Britain	1	(0)
Medal record
Men's football
Representing Great Britain
Olympic Games
Gold medal – first place	1900 Paris	Team competition
- * Club domestic league appearances and goals

Henry North Haslam (5 June 1879 – 13 October 1942) was a British footballer who played as an outside-left. He represented Great Britain at the 1900 Olympic Games in Paris, where he won a gold medal as the captain of the Upton Park club team.

Born in Worksop, his father was the estate manager for the Duke of Newcastle's estates in Newark and Nottingham. Haslam attended Uppingham School and played football and cricket for Worksop.

He played for Tonbridge, with whom he toured Belgium in 1900, and with Upton Park during four continental tours. He also played for Tunbridge Wells, Barnet, West Norwood, and Shrewsbury Town.

Haslam was a reservist with the West Yorkshire Regiment between 1915 and 1920. In 1926, he was convicted for shopbreaking and sentenced to 12 months imprisonment with hard labour, and in 1937 was imprisoned for three months for theft.
