= Raul Kelecom =

Belgian footballer

Olympic medal record

Men's football

Representing Belgium
Bronze medal – third place	1900 Paris	Team competition

Raul Kelecom was a Belgian football player who competed in the 1900 Olympic Games. In Paris he won a bronze medal as a member of Université de Bruxelles club team. In the Official Report of the 1900 Games, his surname is spelled Kelcone.
