= Jack Zealley =

English footballer

Personal information
- Full name: Walter John Zealley
- Date of birth: 2 November 1874
- Place of birth: Bothenhampton, Dorset, England
- Date of death: 15 May 1956 (aged 81)
- Place of death: Weymouth, Dorset, England
- Position: Inside left

Senior career*
Years	Team	Apps	(Gls)
1892–1910	Bridport		
- Upton Park

International career
1900	Great Britain	1	(0)
Medal record
Men's football
Representing Great Britain
Gold medal – first place	1900 Paris	Team competition
- * Club domestic league appearances and goals

Walter John Zealley (2 November 1874 – 15 May 1956) was an English footballer who played as an inside-left. He represented Great Britain at the 1900 Olympic Games in Paris, winning a gold medal as a member of Upton Park club team. He scored one goal.

Zealley was a dairy farmer, working on the family farm in Dorset, and a Sergeant in the Dorset Yeomanry. His brother, Arthur, played Minor Counties cricket for Dorset.

He played as an amateur with Bridport, where he scored 73 goals in 226 appearances between 1899 and 1908. He regularly joined Upton Park for annual tours of Britain, the Channel Islands and France.
