= Claude Buckenham =

English cricketer and footballer

Percy Buckenham
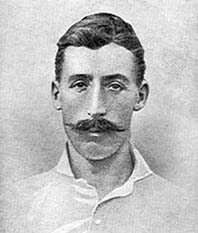

Personal information
- Full name: Claude Percival Buckenham
- Born: 16 January 1876; Herne Hill, London, England
- Died: 23 February 1937 (aged 61); Dundee, Scotland
- Batting: Right-handed
- Bowling: Right-arm fast
- Role: Bowler

International information
- National side: England
- Test debut (cap 165): 1 January 1910 v South Africa
- Last Test: 9 March 1910 v South Africa

Domestic team information
- Years: Team
- 1899–1914: Essex

Career statistics
Competition	Test	First-class
Matches	4	307
Runs scored	43	5,641
Batting average	6.14	14.50
100s/50s	0/0	2/12
Top score	17	124
Balls bowled	1182	52,148
Wickets	21	1,150
Bowling average	28.23	25.31
5 wickets in innings	1	85
10 wickets in match	0	17
Best bowling	5/115	8/33
Catches/stumpings	2/–	172/–
- Source: CricketArchive, 20 June 2009
Association football career
- Position: Right back
Senior career*
Years	Team	Apps	(Gls)
- Santos
International career
- Essex
	Great Britain Olympic	1	(0)
Medal record
Men's football
Representing Great Britain
Gold medal – first place	1900 Paris	Team competition
- * Club domestic league appearances and goals

Claude Percival Buckenham (16 January 1876 – 23 February 1937) was an English first-class cricketer who played for Essex and England. He also won a gold medal playing football at the Olympic Games in 1900.

== Life and career ==
Tall and gangling, and with a distinctive moustache, Percy Buckenham was a fast bowler and a useful lower order batsman. He played for Essex from 1899 to 1914, but suffered, particularly in his early years, from slipshod fielding which meant, according to his obituary in Wisden Cricketers' Almanack, he was more expensive than he perhaps deserved. His career average, at more than 25, is high for the era in which he played.

The 1906 season was the first in which he took more than 100 wickets, and he played several representative matches over the next few English seasons without breaking into the Test match team in England. He was picked in the squad for the fifth Test at The Oval against the 1909 Australians, but was then left out of the team: his omission was described by Sydney Pardon, editor of Wisden, as "a fatal blunder" and the selectors' decision not to include a fast bowler at all "touched the confines of lunacy".

Buckenham's only Test experience came on the 1909-10 tour to South Africa, under the captaincy of H. D. G. Leveson Gower. In four Tests, he took 21 wickets at 28 runs apiece, including five for 115 in the first South African innings of the third Test at Johannesburg. But though he had his most productive season in 1911, with 134 first-class wickets, he was considered too old for the 1911-12 tour to Australia.

Buckenham was a good amateur footballer and played county soccer for Essex. He played right-back for the Upton Park F.C. team that won the inaugural Olympic football tournament in 1900. He is one of only four male Test cricketers to compete at the Olympic Games.

Buckenham retired from first-class cricket in 1914 to become professional at the Scottish club Forfarshire. After serving with the Royal Garrison Artillery in the First World War he became cricket coach at Repton School.
