= Tom Burridge =

British footballer

Olympic medal record

Men's football

Representing Great Britain
Gold medal – first place	1900 Paris	Team competition

Tom Eustace Burridge (30 April 1881 in Pimlico – 16 September 1965 in Chatham, Kent) was a British footballer who won a gold medal at the 1900 Summer Olympics as part of the Upton Park club side. He played centre half.

His name is sometimes spelled Barridge and his initials given as J. E. by some sources, but he is listed as T. E. Burridge, both by the IOC on their website, and by other statistical sources such as RSSSF.
