= Fred Spackman =

English footballer

Personal information
- Full name: Frederick George Spackman
- Date of birth: 16 September 1878
- Place of birth: Maidstone, Kent, England
- Date of death: 30 May 1942 (aged 63)
- Place of death: Bromley, London, England
- Position: Inside right

Senior career*
Years	Team	Apps	(Gls)
- Queens Park Rangers
- Wandsworth
	Fulham	53	
1900	Upton Park		

International career
1900	Great Britain	1	(0)
Medal record
Men's football
Representing Great Britain
Gold medal – first place	1900 Paris	Team competition
- * Club domestic league appearances and goals

Frederick George Spackman (16 September 1878 – 30 May 1942) was a British footballer who played as an inside-right. He competed in the 1900 Olympic Games in Paris, winning a gold medal as a member of Upton Park club team.

Spackman played for Queens Park Rangers and Wandsworth before joining Fulham during the 1899–1900 season, along with his brother Harry. He was part of the team that won the Southern League Second Division in 1902–03. He made a total of 53 league appearances for the club.

Spackman worked as a proofreader for The Times.
