= William Quash =

English footballer

Olympic medal record

Men's football

Representing Great Britain
Gold medal – first place	1900 Paris	Team competition

William Francis Patterson Quash (27 December 1868 in Barking, London – 17 May 1938 in Barking, London) was an English football player who competed in the 1900 Olympic Games for Great Britain. In Paris he won a gold medal as a member of Upton Park club team.
