= Eric Thornton =

British footballer in Belgium (1882–1945)

Personal information
- Full name: Eric Peter Hypolithe Thornton
- Date of birth: 5 July 1882
- Place of birth: Worthing, England
- Date of death: 26 November 1945 (aged 63)
- Place of death: Brussels, Belgium
- Positions: Forward; goalkeeper

Senior career*
Years	Team	Apps	(Gls)
1897–1907	Léopold FC	70	(25)
1907–1911	Beerschot AC	42	(0)
Total		112	(25)

International career
1905	Belgium	2	(0)
Medal record
Men's football
Representing Belgium
Bronze medal – third place	1900 Paris	Team competition
- * Club domestic league appearances and goals

Eric Thornton (5 July 1882 – 26 November 1945) was an English footballer who competed in the 1900 Olympic Games. There he won a bronze medal as a member of a mixed team representing Belgium that was mostly made up of students from the Université de Bruxelles. Born in England, he represented the Belgium national team in two official matches in 1905.

== Football career ==
Although born in England and possibly an English national in 1900, Thornton became a resident in Brussels for unclear reasons and joined the city's Léopold FC as a forward in 1897, but later turned to goalkeeping and in 1907, he moved to Beerschot AC.

At the time of the 1900 Olympics in Paris, Thornton was still a forward at Léopold and was studying at the Université de Bruxelles, and like many other students of that university, he was selected to represent Belgium in the football tournament of the Olympics, featuring in the team's only games at the tournament against Club Français, which ended in a 2–6 loss.

Despite being a British citizen, Thornton has the distinction of having played two official matches with the Belgium national team, both in 1905, and both against the Netherlands, conceding a total of eight goals in 1–4 and 0–4 losses. In-between these two matches, Thornton was also selected to play against France in Brussels on 7 May, but USFSA opposed it since he did not have Belgian nationality, which delayed the match for one hour since Belgium had to get another goalkeeper, Robert Hustin of Racing Club de Bruxelles.

Thornton ended his footballing career in 1911 to concentrate on his ship brokering business.

== Later life and death ==
When the First World War broke out in July 1914, Thornton fled to the Yser Front, and in early 1915, a small group of Belgian players who had retreated to France formed a committee of the Belgian FA in Paris, which was able to organize several wartime matches between Belgian and French teams thanks to the generous intervention of the patron Thornton, who rented the grounds, paid for travel, equipment, and Etcetera.

Thornton died in Antwerp on 26 November 1945, at the age of 63.

== Honours ==
Université de Bruxelles

- Summer Olympics:
  - Bronze medal (1): 1900
