= Eugène Neefs =

Belgian footballer and veterinarian

Olympic medal record

Men's football

Representing Belgium
Bronze medal – third place	1900 Paris	Team competition

Eugène Neefs was a Belgian football player who competed in the 1900 Olympic Games. In Paris he won a bronze medal as a member of Université de Bruxelles club team.

Professionally, Neefs was a military veterinarian.
