= Alfred Chalk =

English footballer and railway clerk

Personal information
- Full name: Alfred Erskine Chalk
- Date of birth: 27 November 1874
- Place of birth: Plaistow, Greater London, England
- Date of death: 25 June 1954 (Age 79)
- Place of death: Bridge, Kent, England
- Position: Right half

Senior career*
Years	Team	Apps	(Gls)
1900	Upton Park		

International career
1900	Great Britain Olympic	1	(0)
Medal record
Men's football
Representing Great Britain
Olympic Games
Gold medal – first place	1900 Paris	Team Competition
- * Club domestic league appearances and goals

Alfred Ernest Chalk (27 November 1874 – 25 June 1954) was a British Railway clerk and footballer who competed in the 1900 Olympic Games.

He was well known in London football circles at the turn of the century. He played for Ilford, Barking Woodville, and Essex County, and was right-half for Upton Park when they won the gold medal in the 1900 Olympics. According to the limited reports which reached London from Paris, Chalk was one of the Olympic side's outstanding players. He was one of 18 children of a railway station manager and followed in his father's profession by becoming a railway clerk.
