= William Gosling (footballer) =

English footballer

Personal information
- Full name: William Sullivan Gosling
- Date of birth: 19 July 1869
- Place of birth: Bishop's Stortford, England
- Date of death: 2 October 1952 (aged 83)
- Place of death: Saffron Walden, England
- Position: Defender

Senior career*
| Years | Team | Apps | (Gls) |
- Chelmsford
- Upton Park

International career
| 1900 | Great Britain Olympic | 1 | (0) |
Medal record
Men's football
Representing Great Britain
Olympic Games
| Gold medal – first place | 1900 Paris | Team competition |
- * Club domestic league appearances and goals

William Sullivan Gosling (19 July 1869 – 2 October 1952) was a British Army officer and football player who competed in the 1900 Olympic Games.

== Biography ==
Gosling was the younger brother of Robert Gosling, both were educated at Eton College and were members of a wealthy Essex family. He was commissioned a second lieutenant in the Scots Guards on 4 March 1891, was promoted lieutenant on 5 February 1896, and captain on 7 October 1899. He served twice in the Second Boer War, with the 1st Battalion 1899–1900, when he took part in the march to Bloemfontein in March 1900; and secondly in 1902 when he was in command of reinforcements of 250 officers and men of the 3rd Battalion leaving Southampton in the transport Dilwara 15 April 1902 to arrive in South Africa the following month. He was invalided home after contracting typhoid fever and after the war resigned his commission from the Scots Guards in 1903 when he transferred to the Essex Yeomanry, from which in turn he resigned in 1912.

At the 1911 census he was living at Lovells Court, Marnhull, Dorset. In about the same year he purchased Marton Hall near Myddle, Shropshire and was living there until he returned to Essex although he owned the hall until his death. In World War I he returned to serve with the 3rd Battalion of the Scots Guards and was mainly stationed at their depot in Wellington Barracks, London although he was on duty for ten days in France in January 1917. He was demobilised in May 1919 with rank of major.

Upon his brother's death in 1922, he took over at the family's Hassiobury Farm estate near Bishops Stortford. He was appointed J.P. in 1923, High Sheriff in 1927 and deputy lieutenant (D.L.) in 1929 for the county of Essex.

Gosling married, on 12 November 1903, Lady Victoria Alexandrina Alberta Kerr, fifth daughter of Schomberg Kerr, 9th Marquess of Lothian and a god-daughter of Queen Victoria, and by her had four sons.

== Football career ==
Gosling was a regular full-back for Old Etonians, Casuals and Chelmsford and had appeared in a representative match for London against Sheffield in 1892. In the 1900 Paris Olympics, during an interval between his periods of service in South Africa, he won a gold medal as a member of Upton Park club team picked to represent Great Britain, although an injury during the games put him off the field for part of the Olympics.
