= Marius Delbecque =

Belgian footballer

Personal information
- Date of birth: 30 March 1880
- Date of death: 14 March 1947 (aged 66)
Medal record
Men's football
Representing Belgium
Olympic Games
Bronze medal – third place	1900 Paris	Team competition

Marius Delbecque (30 March 1880 – 14 March 1947) was a Belgian football player who competed in the 1900 Olympic Games. In Paris he won a bronze medal as a member of Université de Bruxelles club team.
