= John Nicholas (footballer) =

English footballer

Olympic medal record

Men's football

Representing Great Britain
Gold medal – first place	1900 Paris	Team competition

John Nicholas (24 July 1879 in Allahabad – 29 September 1929) was a British footballer who competed in the 1900 Olympic Games. In Paris he won a gold medal as a member of Upton Park club team.
