= Eugène Fraysse =

French footballer (1870–1950)

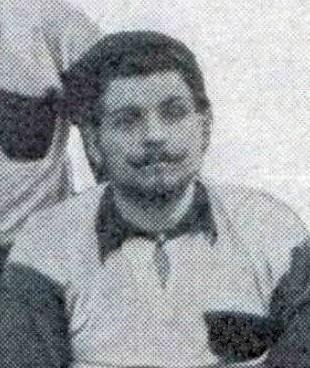
- Eugène Fraysse in 1896

Personal information
- Full name: Jean Eugène Fraysse
- Date of birth: 4 May 1870
- Place of birth: 18th arrondissement of Paris, France
- Date of death: 1 May 1950 (aged 79)
- Place of death: 16th arrondissement of Paris, France
- Position: Forward

Senior career*
Years	Team	Apps	(Gls)
1892–1899	Club Français		
1899–1901	Racing Club de France		

International career
1895–1896	Paris XI	2	(0)
1900	France (Olympic)	1	(2)

Managerial career
- 1900: France (Olympic)
Medal record
Men's football
Representing France
Football at the Summer Olympics
Silver medal – second place	1900 Paris	Team competition
- * Club domestic league appearances and goals

Jean Eugène Fraysse (4 May 1870 – 1 May 1950) was a French footballer who played as a forward. He founded Club Français in 1892, becoming its first captain and leading the club to multiple trophies in the late 20th century, including the 1896 French Championship (USFSA) and two Coupe Manier titles in 1897 and 1898.

He competed in the football tournament at the 1900 Olympic Games in Paris, winning a silver medal as a member of the USFSA Olympic team representing France, which was primarily made up of Club Français players.

== Early life and education ==
Jean Eugène Fraysse was born in the 18th arrondissement of Paris on 4 May 1870, (Note: Some sources wrongly claim that he was born on 24 August 1879, due to a confusion with a certain Maurice-Eugène Fraysse, the son of an undeclared father who was recognized by his mother, Florentine-Pétronille Fraysse, a seamstress.) as the son of a well-off family from the wealthy districts of Paris, and therefore, he was sent to Britain to complete his studies. During his four years there, he developed a deep interest in football, so when he returned to Paris in the summer of 1892, he decided to found a football club.

== Club career ==
=== Founding Club Français ===
Upon his return to Paris, Fraysse eventually met fellow countrymen Charles Bernat, who had also become a football fan during his language study trip across the English Channel, so they decided to join forces to import the sport into France, and together, they founded Club Français in October 1892. While most of the clubs in France founded in the 19th century were the creation of the British who had left their homeland, the Club Français was the work of two Frenchman, becoming the first club reserved exclusively for the French, hence its name.

Shortly after its foundation, Fraysse argued with the captain of Standard Athletic Club, Philip Tomalin, which resulted in a match between their clubs on 1 November 1892. Without a designated field, Club Français was forced to tour the several stadiums of western Paris during its first years of existence, but even though the club was constantly changing fields, CF's position remained solid, even institutionally, because many of its members were sitting on the USFSA Football Commission or ensuring media coverage like Weber or André Saint-Ignan.

In 1894, he was appointed vice-president and captain of Club Français. In November 1894, Fraysse became president of the (Football) Association Commission of the USFSA. On 17 February 1895, he attended the annual gala dinner of The White Rovers held by its founding president William Sleator, who welcomed the visiting clubs, and Fraysse responded to the "toast" by replying on behalf of the Club Français.

=== Pioneering matches ===
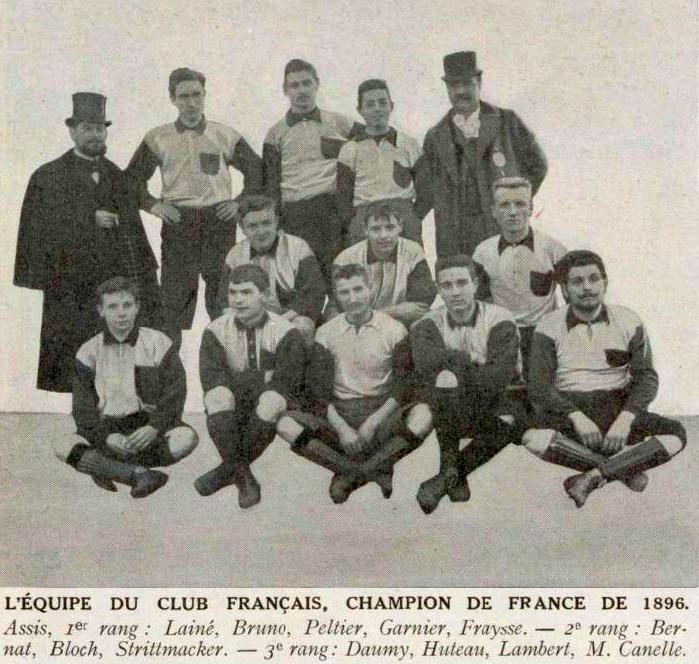
Fraysse (seated on the floor, first from right) featured in the Club Français team that won the 1896 championship of France.

Club Français joined the USFSA in March 1894, and on 22 April of the same year, Fraysse started as a forward in the semifinal of the inaugural USFSA championship, which ended in a 0–1 loss to The White Rovers. On 24 February 1895, Fraysse and his teammate Bernat were the only Frenchman selected to play for the first representative team of Paris in a friendly match against the London-based Folkestone at the soggy pitch of the Seine Velodrome, which ended in a 0–3 loss. In 1896, Fraysse captained the Club Français team to victory in the 1896 USFSA Football Championship, doing so without losing a single match. In July 1896, Fraysse refereed a match between the second teams of Club Français and CP Asnières.

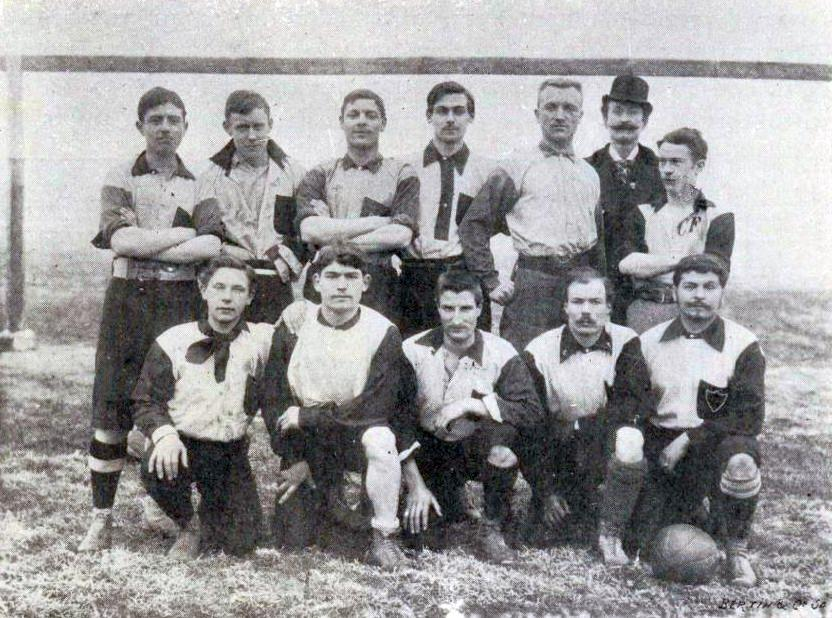
Fraysse (seated on the floor, first from right) with Club Français at the Parc des Princes on 26 December 1897.

In December 1896, Fraysse captained the first exclusively French selection against the English Ramblers, a motley selection of Englishmen on tour, and he then did it again on 26 December 1897, in which was the very first football match in the history of the Parc des Princes in front of 500 spectators, leading Club Français to a 1–3 loss to the English Ramblers. During the match, he became a little dizzy after falling against a post, and missed several chances, and after the match, it was said that he had imagined having played a championship match and was therefore sad. On 25 April 1897, he started in the final of the inaugural Coupe Manier against the newly crowded champions of France Standard AC, converting a penalty in the first-half, netting a late equaliser to make it 3–3, and then completing his hat-trick with a long shot in extra-time to seal a 4–3 victory to his side.

=== National dominance ===
On 28 March 1898, Fraysse started in the final of the 1898 Coupe Manier at the Vélodrome de Vincennes, helping his side to a 10–0 win over Paris Star. In the following week, on 3 April, he started in the final of the 1898 USFSA Football Championship against Standard AC at Courbevoie, which ended in a 2–3 loss.

In the following year, on 16 April 1899, he started in the play-off match against Standard AC to decide the 1898–99 USFSA Paris championship, assisting two goals to help his side to a 3–2 win. This victory qualified the club to the 1899 USFSA national championship, in which Club Français withdrew from the final before facing Le Havre AC.

=== Later career ===
In 1899, the 29-year-old Fraysse moved to Racing Club de France, where he retired in 1901, aged 31. In the following year, Fraysse co-financed the purchase of a 30-hectare plot of land in Vésinet, to install fields and changing rooms for the Club Français, of which he was still president.

According to his former teammate Ernest Weber, one of the first CF members who later became a renowned journalist for L'Auto (the forerunner of L'Équipe), Fraysse was "loud-mouthed, abrupt, violent", but also an exciting leader of men and a great team captain. On 1 April 1907, several former players from the 1890s, who had been retired for years, came together to play a friendly match for the so-called Vieilles Gloires ("Old Glories"), including the 36-year-old Fraysse, who thus reunited with his fellow CF founders Bernat and Weber, even writing a letter for the latter "overwhelming him with reproaches". A few days later, Weber wrote an article about their reunion, referring to him as "Eugène Cresson", and stating that "he wanted to talk about the Club Français and its founders, and was surprised by my lack of memory", and then added that the first players of CF "produced a beautiful series of efforts and showed a magnificent disinterested ardor, who ensured the success of association football from its beginnings in France".

== International career ==
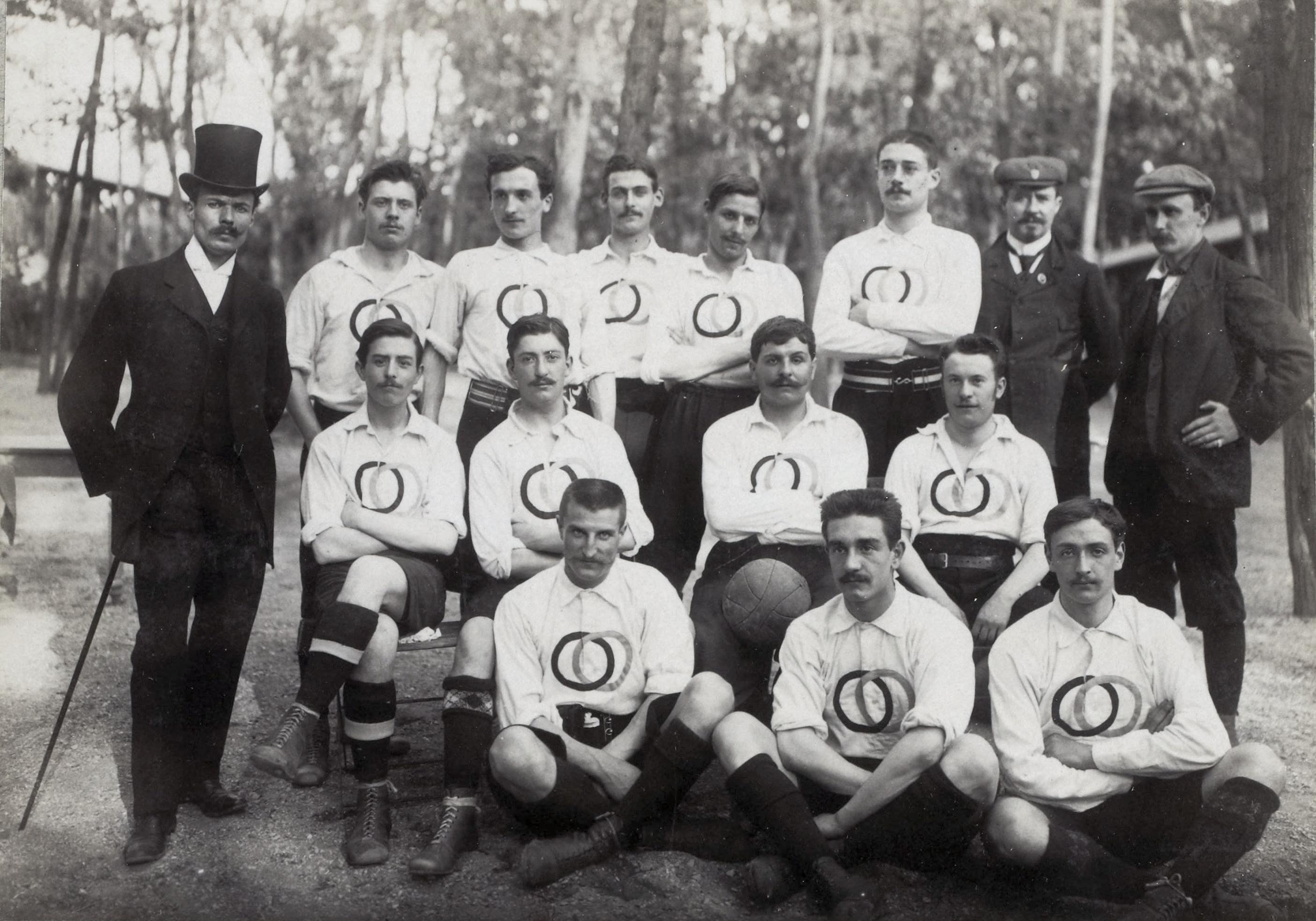
Fraysse (2nd row, second from the right) with the French team at the 1900 Olympics.

The French champions in 1899 and 1900, Havre AC, were not willing to participate in the 1900 Olympic Games, so the USFSA asked for the runners-up Club Français to participate, possibly to also attract more spectators and keep down expenses, and the three guest players were Fraysse of Racing Club de France, who also played a leading role within the USFSA as the head of its Association Commission, and his Racing teammates Peltier and René Ressejac-Duparc. At the time, the figure of the coach as we know it today did not yet exist, so it was the duty of the captain, Fraysse, to dictate the tactics to be followed and making up the line-ups, and he chose to align, not a heterogeneous selection as in 1896 against the English Ramblers, but a reinforced club, to ensure the cohesion of the team. Furthermore, Fraysse was responsible, along with Léopold Alibert and Neville Tunmer, for training the French team, in which he also played; a sort of player-coach.

Fraysse was listed as a forward for the USFSA team at the 1900 Olympic Games. Fraysse captained the French team in its opening match against Upton Park on 20 September, which ended in a humiliating 0–4 loss, thus becoming the first captain of a French national team. The French team came second and Fraysse was thus awarded with a silver medal.

== Later life ==
Fraysse distanced himself from football in 1903, and he later got involved in tennis and even Basque pelota. He became the owner of the tennis courts of rue Delaizementin at the 16th arrondissement of Paris, and in August 1903, he allowed those courts to be used for the tennis championship of the Club Français. It was also in the 16th, rue Borghese, that Fraysse opened a Fronton de pelota basque in 1903.

== Writing career ==
Fraysse wrote in collaboration with the Englishman Alfred Tunmer (former player of the Standard AC) and his brother Neville, the first French work devoted to association football, called Football Association, which was published in 1897 by Armand Colin (followed by several re-editions until 1913). Fraysse and Neville, who had coached the French team at the 1900 Olympics, described the football team as a military squadron under the orders of its officer, stating that "the many qualities that a player must possess to properly fulfill the functions of captain are the same required of a general; his team is a small army that he must know how to command, instruct and lead, and the team must have unlimited confidence in him".

== Death and legacy ==
Fraysse died in the 16th arrondissement of Paris on 1 May 1950, just three days short of his 80th birthday.

On 12 November 2020, Pierre Cazal published his book called Sélectionneurs des Bleus: De Fraysse à Deschamps (The managers of the Bleus: From Fraysse to Deschamps), which relates the chronology of the several managers of the French team.

== Honours ==
=== Club ===
Club Français

- USFSA Paris Championship:
  - Champions (1): 1898–99
- USFSA Football Championship:
  - Champions (1): 1896
  - Runner-up (2): 1898 and 1899
- Coupe Manier:
  - Champions (2): 1897 and 1898

=== International ===
France MNT

- Summer Olympics:
  - Silver medal (1): 1900

== Bibliography ==
- Sorez, Julien (2013). Le football dans Paris et ses banlieues [Football in Paris and its suburbs] (in French). Paris: Presses universitaires de Rennes. p. 410. ISBN 978-2-7535264-3-3.
- Denaunay, Stéphane; De Ryswick, Jacques; Cornu, Jean; Vermand, Dominique (July 1989). 100 ans de football en France [100 years of football in France] (in French). Paris: Atlas. p. 27. ISBN 978-27312136-5-2.
