= 1899 USFSA Football Championship =

Tournament details
- Country: France
- Teams: 3

Final positions
- Champions: Le Havre AC (1st title)
- Runners-up: Club Français

The 1899 USFSA Football Championship was the 6th staging of the USFSA Football Championship. This edition was the first of the new version created that year by the USFSA, which decided to extend the competition beyond the Paris region in order to increase the popularity of the sport across the country. This edition, which was open to provincial clubs, is thus considered by many as the first real French championship with teams from Paris and the Province.

== Overview ==
In the Paris Championship, Standard Athletic Club and Club Français finished level on points, so a play-off had to be played to decide the winner. Club français won 3–2.

Two northern teams from the Province, Le Havre Athletic Club and the Nord champion Iris Club Lillois, faced each other in the semifinal on 19 February 1899 at the Parc des Princes, with the winner playing the final against the best team from Paris (Club Français), but this game never took place due to a grotesque organizational problem: No ball at kick-off, and when another one was finally found, it was already too late as the game only lasted 45 minutes because of the hockey players who were scheduled to play right after them. The game was thus postponed for 25 March, now in Amiens, but the northern winners had to forfeit after a flu epidemic of influenza struck the players, so Le Havre reached the final by default.

Club Français refused to play the final against a team that had neither been crowned champion of its region, nor won its "half-semifinal", so the Paris club was promptly disqualified and Le Havre was proclaimed the French champions, becoming the first club to do so without having played a single game (similar to Athletic Bilbao in the 1904 Copa del Rey).

== Tournament ==
=== Semifinals ===
Iris Club Lillois withdrew because they had influenza, so Le Havre AC reached the final by default.

=== Final ===
Club Français refused to play in the final, so the USFSA awarded Le Havre AC the French championship.
