= Upton Park F.C. =

Amateur football club in Essex, England

Upton Park
- Full name: Upton Park Football Club
- Nicknames: The "Scarlet & Black"
- Founded: 1866; 1891 (reformed); 2016 (reformed)
- Dissolved: 1887 (first time) c. 1911 (second time)
- Ground: West Ham Park
- Capacity: 1,000
- Website: https://www.facebook.com/Uptonparkfootballclub
Home colours

Olympic medal record

Men's football
Gold medal – first place	1900 Paris	Team

Upton Park Football Club was an amateur football club from Upton Park, then in Essex but now part of the London Borough of Newham, in the late 19th and early 20th century, now defunct. As well as being one of the fifteen teams that played in the inaugural FA Cup in 1871, they also represented Great Britain at the first Olympic football tournament in 1900, which they won.

== History ==
Founded in 1866, the club were one of the 15 teams to play in the very first edition of the FA Cup in 1871–72; they never won the competition but did reach the quarter-finals on four occasions. They were also the inaugural winners of the London Senior Cup in 1882–83. Though resolutely an amateur club, they inadvertently sparked the legalisation of professionalism in the game after complaining about Preston North End's payments to players after the two met in the FA Cup in 1884; Preston were disqualified, but the incident made the FA confront the issue and, under threat of a breakaway, they allowed payments to players the following year.

The club were wound up in 1887 but were resurrected four years later in 1891. In 1892 they were founder members of the Southern Alliance, an early league competition amongst teams from southern England, but were bottom of the league with only one win to their name when the competition folded before the 1892–93 season ended.

Despite the obvious similarity of name to Upton Park stadium (officially known as the Boleyn Ground), the club had no connection with the ground and never played there; however there were formal links between Upton Park and West Ham United (then known as Thames Ironworks) and many players did play for both. In addition, Upton Park's home games in West Ham Park attracted large crowds to their games, which may have influenced Thames Ironworks' decision to move to the area from Canning Town, where football was not as popular.

=== 1900 Olympic Games ===
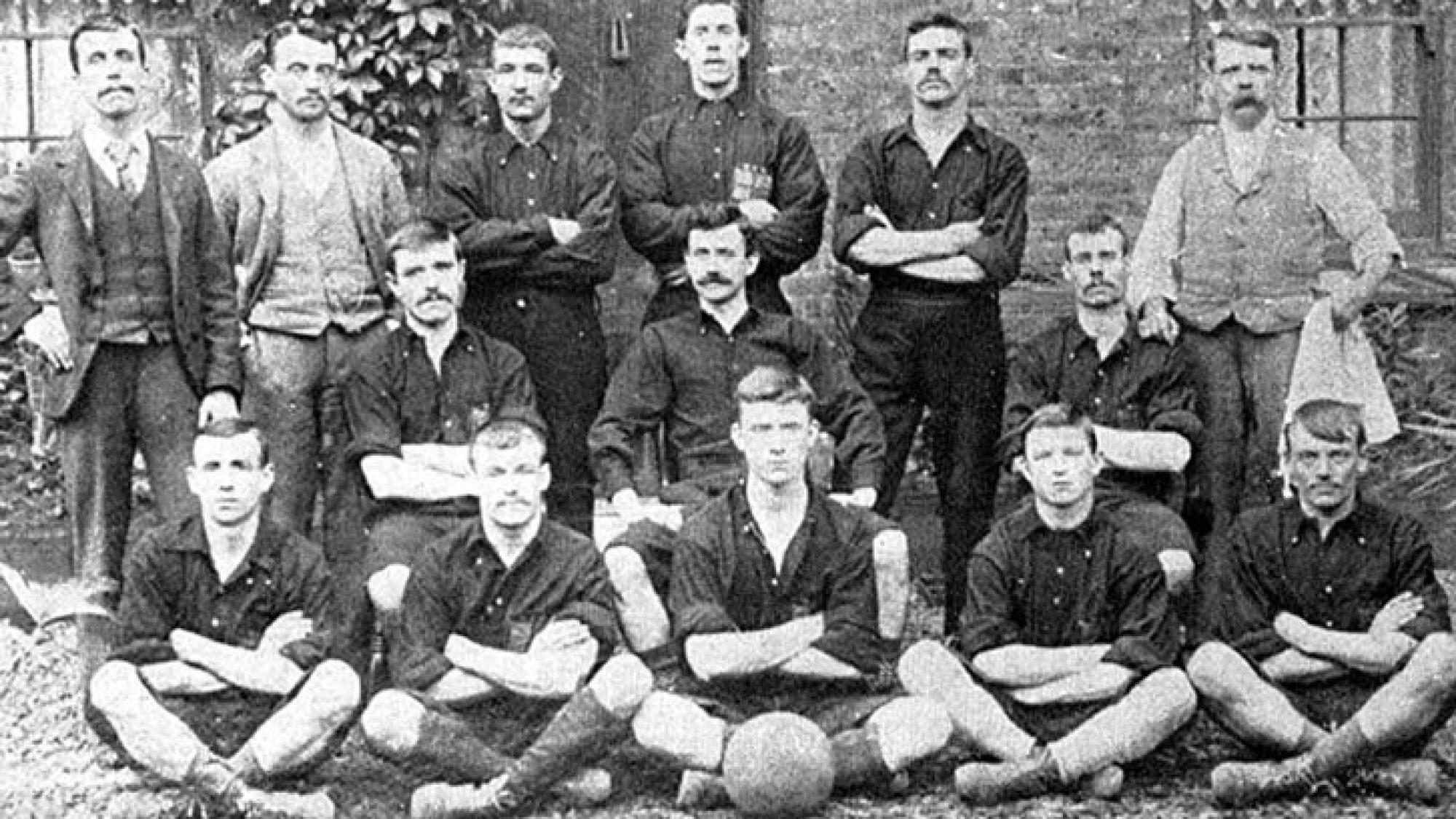
An Upton Park team of 1900. That year the team won the Gold medal representing Great Britain at the Olympics

The Amateur Status Committee of the Football Association offered the club the opportunity to play in Paris at the inaugural Olympic Games. Records show that Upton Park were the first club to agree to play, but were unlikely to be the first to be asked. Upton Park were not participating in a league at the time playing only cup games and friendlies. They had never reached the semi-final stage of the FA Amateur Cup and the competition was now in its seventh year.

The club secretary and goalkeeper James Jones selected the team and brought in players from other amateur teams; Richard Turner joined from Crouch End Vampires, William Gosling, a soldier on leave, joined from Chelmsford, Alfred Chalk joined from Ilford and Jack Zealley joined from Bridport FC. Gosling's Chelmsford side had beaten Upton Park 7–1 in January 1900.

Upton Park won the competition in Paris, beating a USFSA XI representing France, 4–0. Although a gold medal was not awarded to the side at the time (it being a demonstration sport), the IOC have since retrospectively awarded one. The team that day (playing a 2–3–5 formation) was:

James Jones; Claude Buckenham, William Gosling; Alfred Chalk, T. E. Burridge, William Quash; Richard Turner, F. G. Spackman, John Nicholas, Jack Zealley, Henry Haslam (captain)

The scorers were Nicholas (with two), Turner and Zealley.

== Honours ==
Domestic

- London Senior Cup
  - Winners (2): 1882–83, 1883–84
  - Runners-Up (1): 1884–85

International

- Olympic Games
  - Gold medalists (1): 1900

== Famous players ==
Famous players for the side included Charles Alcock, later president of the Football Association, FA Cup Final referees Alfred Stair and Segar Bastard (who was also an England international), and Charlie Dove, one of the early leading players for Thames Ironworks. Upton Park also supplied two other England internationals, Clement Mitchell and Conrad Warner. Claude Buckenham, who played in the Olympic team of 1900, represented England at cricket.

== Legacy ==
Upton Park continued to play until at least 1911, according to modern-day records. The Upton Park Trophy, the annual playoff between the league champions of Guernsey and Jersey, is named for the Upton Park side, to commemorate their tenth annual tour of the islands, which they made in 1906. In 2016, coinciding with West Ham United's move to the London Stadium, Upton Park were 'reformed' as an amateur club and staged the final game at the Boleyn Ground, against Royal Engineers.

Upton Park FC was responsible for proposing two of the most important rule changes in the history of association football: in 1870, the club proposed abolishing all handling of the ball (previously, any player was allowed to catch the ball). In 1871, the club introduced a proposal to create the special position of goalkeeper, who alone would be allowed to handle the ball.

== Refoundation ==
The team was refounded in 2016, it is an amateur team and competes only in friendlies, usually for charity.
