= List of Olympic medalists in cricket =

This is the complete list of Olympic medallists in cricket.

== Men ==
| Games | Gold | Silver | Bronze |
|---|---|---|---|
| 1900 Paris | Devon and Somerset Wanderers; Great Britain C. B. K. Beachcroft (captain) (GBR); Birkett (GBR); Alfred Bowerman (GBR); George Buckley (GBR); Francis Burchell (GBR); Frederick Christian (GBR); Harry Corner (GBR); Frederick Cuming (GBR); William Donne (GBR); Alfred Powlesland (GBR); John Symes (GBR); Montagu Toller (GBR) | French Athletic Club Union; France William Anderson (GBR); William Attrill (FRA); John Braid (GBR); W. Browning (GBR); Robert Horne (GBR); Timothée Jordan (GBR); Arthur MacEvoy (GBR); Douglas Robinson (GBR); H. F. Roques (FRA); Alfred Schneidau (GBR); Henry Terry (GBR); Philip Tomalin (captain) (FRA) | Only two teams competed |
| 1904–2024 | Not included in the Olympic program | | |
