= Cricket at the Summer Olympics =

- IOC Code: CKT
- Governing body: ICC
- Events: 2 (men: 1; women: 1)

Summer Olympics
- 1896; 1900; 1904; 1908; 1912; 1920; 1924; 1928; 1932; 1936; 1948; 1952; 1956; 1960; 1964; 1968; 1972; 1976; 1980; 1984; 1988; 1992; 1996; 2000; 2004; 2008; 2012; 2016; 2020; 2024; 2028; 2032
- Medalists

Cricket was played at the 1900 Summer Olympics, a men's contest with only two entrants, won by Great Britain over France. It is scheduled to be included again in the 2028 Summer Olympics in Los Angeles, with men's and women's Twenty20 tournaments.

== History ==
Cricket was originally scheduled to be included in the inaugural 1896 Summer Olympics, which were held in Athens: cricket would have been the only team sport held at the Games. However, due to insufficient entries the tournament was cancelled.

=== 1900 Games ===
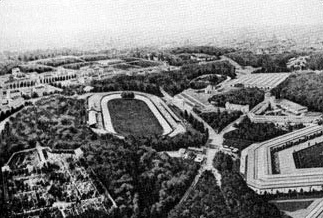
Vélodrome de Vincennes hosted the cricket matches at the 1900 Summer Olympics in Paris.

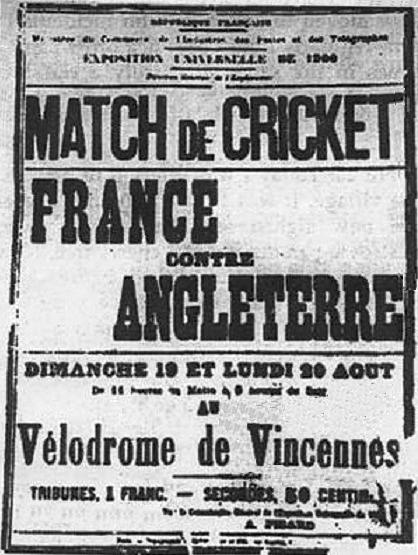
Poster of the only Olympic cricket match in French.

Cricket was held at the 1900 Summer Olympics in Paris four years later but only two countries competed, Great Britain and hosts France. The French team was mostly represented by English expatriates, and it is officially considered a mixed team while the English team was represented by Devon and Somerset Wanderers Cricket Club, so it was not nationally selected. The players were also mostly club cricketers — only the British side had any first-class cricket experience, with eight such games through Somerset's Montagu Toller and Alfred Bowerman.

The teams played a two-day match over two innings with 12-a-side, so the match did not attract first-class status. Great Britain won the match by 158 runs to win the gold medal: if the French had held out for five more minutes, the game would have been declared a draw. Knowledge of the game would have been lost but for the forethought of John Symes, a member of the victorious team, who kept a scorecard in his own writing.

A cricket tournament was scheduled for 1904 Summer Olympics held in St. Louis, but it was cancelled due to a lack of entries.

=== Reintroduction in 2028 ===
Many of cricket's governing bodies, including the Board of Control for Cricket in India (BCCI) and the England and Wales Cricket Board (ECB), were long opposed to a return to the Olympics. The ECB withdrew their opposition in 2015, and in March 2017, it was reported that International Cricket Council chief Dave Richardson thought the "time is right" for Olympic cricket. It was also reported that the opposition of the BCCI had softened.

In October 2020, USA Cricket stated that it saw a proposed inclusion of cricket in the 2028 Summer Olympics in Los Angeles as a long-term goal. In 2020, the BCCI in its Annual General Meeting decided to back the ICC's bid for inclusion of T20 cricket in 2028 after getting some clarifications from the International Olympic Committee. In August 2021, the ICC confirmed its plans to bid for the inclusion of cricket at the Olympics, starting with the 2028 and 2032 games.

On 9 October 2023, the 2028 Olympic organising committee announced that cricket was on the list of sports they wished to introduce. On 13 October 2023, the IOC announced that the bid was accepted and placed under voting to finalize its inclusion in 2028 during the 141st IOC Session in Mumbai between 14 and 16 October 2023. It was confirmed on 16 October 2023 that cricket would be featured in the 2028 Olympics as only two IOC members voted against inclusion, featuring both men's and women's T20 tournaments. The LA 2028 Organizing Committee President noted that Indian cricket legend Virat Kohli was one of the main reasons behind the sport's introduction to the Olympic program and thanked him.

== Team eligibilities ==
The United Kingdom competes at the Olympics as Great Britain, and includes athletes from four home nations of England, Scotland, Wales, and Northern Ireland, three crown dependencies of Guernsey, Jersey, and Isle of Man, and all but three of the British Overseas Territories, (Note: The exceptions are Bermuda, British Virgin Islands, and Cayman Islands.) although athletes from Northern Ireland may also represent Ireland. In cricket, Scotland has its own team, the England team represents England and Wales, and the Ireland team represents all of Ireland, although in the past native Irish and Scottish players played for England. In addition, cricketers from the Falkland Islands, Gibraltar, Guernsey, the Isle of Man, Jersey and Turks and Caicos Islands, all of whom have their own teams may also represent Great Britain.

The West Indies cricket team covers much of the Caribbean, which has twelve Olympic associations: Antigua and Barbuda, Barbados, British Virgin Islands, Dominica, Grenada, Guyana, Jamaica, Saint Lucia, Saint Vincent and the Grenadines, Saint Kitts and Nevis, Trinidad and Tobago and United States Virgin Islands. Players from these countries would be eligible to represent their own countries, though it is unsure which, if any, of the above will participate. At the men's event of the 1998 Commonwealth Games, only Antigua and Barbuda, Barbados, and Jamaica entered. At the women's event of the 2022 Commonwealth Games, a qualifying tournament was scheduled to be held among the Caribbean nations. However, the tournament was cancelled due to COVID-19 pandemic and Barbados were chosen to represent the region.

Additionally, cricketers from Anguilla and Montserrat, who otherwise play for West Indies, would be eligible for Great Britain at the Olympics, whereas those from Sint Maarten, who also play for West Indies, would be eligible to play for the Netherlands.

== Results ==
=== Men's tournament ===
Year	Host	Gold medal match			Bronze medal match		
Year	Host	Gold	Result	Silver	Bronze	Result	Fourth place
1900	(France); Paris	Great Britain	Great Britain won by 158 runs Scorecard	France	Not held		
2028	(United States); Los Angeles	TBD			TBD		

=== Women's tournament ===
Year	Host	Gold medal match			Bronze medal match		
Year	Host	Gold	Result	Silver	Bronze	Result	Fourth place
2028	(United States); Los Angeles	TBD			TBD		

== Participating nations ==
=== Men's tournament ===
Nation	1900	2028	Years
France	S		1
Great Britain	G		1
United States		Q	1
Total	2	6	

=== Women's tournament ===
Nation	2028	Years
Australia	Q	1
Great Britain	Q	1
India	Q	1
South Africa	Q	1
Total	6	

== Performance by nations ==
=== Men's tournament ===
Team	Gold	Silver	Bronze	Fourth	Total
Great Britain	1 (1900)				1
France		1 (1900)			1

=== Women's tournament ===
Team	Gold	Silver	Bronze	Fourth	Total
TBD					

== Medal table ==
=== Overall ===
Rank	Nation	Gold	Silver	Bronze	Total
1	Great Britain	1	0	0	1
2	France	0	1	0	1
Totals (2 entries)		1	1	0	2

=== Men's tournament ===
Rank	Nation	Gold	Silver	Bronze	Total
1	Great Britain	1	0	0	1
2	France	0	1	0	1
Totals (2 entries)		1	1	0	2

=== Women's tournament ===
Rank	>	Gold	Silver	Bronze	Total
Totals (0 entries)		0	0	0	0

== Venues ==
Games	Venue	Other sports hosted at venues for those games	Capacity	Ref.
1900 Paris	Vélodrome de Vincennes	Cycling, Football, Gymnastics, Rugby union		
2028 Los Angeles	Knight Riders Cricket Ground			

== See also ==
- Cricket at the Asian Games
- Cricket at the Commonwealth Games
