= Great Britain Olympic cricket team =

International cricket team

Great Britain
- Association: British Olympic Association

International Cricket Council
- ICC status: Non-member
- ICC region: Europe

International cricket
- First international: v. France at the Vélodrome de Vincennes, Paris; 19–20 August 1900

The Great Britain cricket team is an international cricket team that represents the United Kingdom in the Summer Olympic Games. The team for most of history has been inactive with cricket only being present in the 1900 Summer Olympics until its reintroduction for the 2028 Games.

Outside of the Summer Olympics, the home nations of England and Wales, Ireland (cricket in Northern Ireland is jointly organised with the Republic of Ireland), and Scotland represent themselves in all other competitions, notably the Cricket World Cup and Women's Cricket World Cup, in addition to various other Test, ODI, and T20 matches.

== History ==
=== 1900 Summer Olympics ===
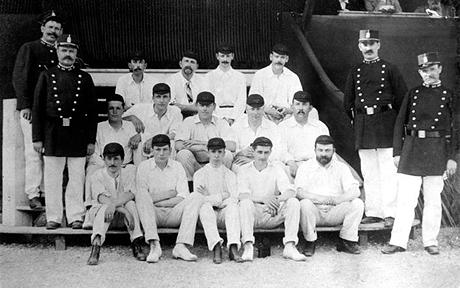
The Great Britain Olympic cricket team in 1900

The 1900 Summer Olympics was the only time cricket was in the Olympic program. With the British Olympic Association being the UK's representative body for the Olympics, a team under the "Great Britain" name was needed for the tournament preventing any of the home nations from competing.

Great Britain was represented by the Devon and Somerset Wanderers Cricket Club who sent the following touring players:

- C.B.K. Beachcroft (c)
- Arthur Birkett
- Alfred Bowerman
- George Buckley
- Francis Burchell
- Frederick Christian
- Harry Corner
- Frederick Cuming
- William Donne
- Alfred Powlesland
- John Symes
- Montagu Toller

The tournament only featured on match against France, with the Netherlands and Belgium withdrawing late on due to difficulties fielding teams. The French side was represented by the Union des Sociétés Françaises de Sports Athlétiques, yet mostly made up of British expats living in Paris with only two members born in France. Despite this, the team was officially France for the games.

The match was a 2-day 12-man contest meaning that it did not class as first-class cricket.

Great Britain won the match by 158 runs.

Cricket was absent from subsequent Olympics and thus the Great Britain side did not play again.

=== 2023–present ===
Announced in October 2023, cricket will return to the Olympics for the 2028 Los Angeles Games, this time as a T20 format. As a result, negotiations began on the formation of a Great Britain team for the games. Reported following the conclusion of the 2024 Paris Games, early stage negotiations between the British Olympic Association, England and Wales Cricket Board (ECB), and Cricket Scotland on the presence of a team at the games. The ECB would be the governing body of such team, though Cricket Scotland are looking to be "actively involved" in supporting the running of the team and providing players and staff. As with any Great Britain Olympic team, the team will also be open to Northern Ireland athletes. It needs to be officially recognised by the International Cricket Council (ICC) and the British Olympic Association (BOA) before becoming a full member of the National Olympic Committee (NOC). England's men's and women's teams would be the qualification vehicle for Team GB, with the Scotland and Northern Ireland players available thereafter.

== Results ==
Great Britain cricket results
No.	Date	Match type	Opposition	Venue	Result
1	19–20 August 1900	2-day 12-man	France	Vélodrome de Vincennes, Paris	Won by 158 runs

== Tournament history ==
Olympic Games record
Year	Round	Position	GP	W	L	T	NR	Win %
(Greece) 1896	No tournament							
(France) 1900	Champions	1/2	1	1	0	0	0	100.00
1904–2024	No tournament							
(United States) 2028	TBA							
(Australia) 2032	TBA							

== Honours ==
- Olympic Games:
  - Champions (1): 1900
