= International cricket in 1900 =

International cricket season

The 1900 international cricket season was from April 1900 to September 1900. The season included a cricket match that took place on 19–20 August between teams representing Great Britain and France as part of the 1900 Summer Olympics cricket match.

== Season overview ==
International tours
Start date	Home team	Away team	Results [Matches]			
Start date	Home team	Away team	Test	ODI	FC	LA
23 August 1900	Canada	England	—	—	1–1 [3]	—
International tournaments
Start date	Tournament				Winners	
9 August 1900	(France) 1900 Olympic Games				(United Kingdom) Great Britain	

== August ==
=== Cricket at the 1900 Olympic Games ===
Final Match
No.	Date	Team 1	Captain 1	Team 2	Captain 2	Venue	Result
Final	19–20 August	France	Philip Tomalin	(United Kingdom) Great Britain	Charles Beachcroft	Vélodrome de Vincennes, Bois de Vincennes	(United Kingdom) Great Britain by 158 runs

=== Boston Zingari in Newfoundland ===
First-class series
No.	Date	Home captain	Away captain	Venue	Result
Match 1	23–24 August	R Turner	Not mentioned	Pleasantville, St. John's	Boston Zingari by 11 runs
Match 2	24–25 August	O Draper	Not mentioned	Pleasantville, St. John's	St. John's City XI by 8 wickets
Match 3	25 August	O Draper	Not mentioned	Pleasantville, St. John's	Match drawn
