= List of Olympic venues in gymnastics =

For the Summer Olympics, there are 34 venues that have been or will be used for gymnastics. Before World War II, the competitions were held outdoors. Since then with the exception of 1960, gymnastics have taken place indoors.

== List ==
Games	Venue	Other sports hosted at venues for those games	Capacity	Ref.
1896 Athens	Panathinaiko Stadium	Athletics, Weightlifting, Wrestling	80,000	
1900 Paris	Vélodrome de Vincennes	Cricket, Cycling, Football, and Rugby union	Not listed.	
1904 St. Louis	Francis Field	Archery, Athletics, Cycling, Football, Lacrosse, Roque, Tennis, Tug of war, Weightlifting, and Wrestling	19,000.	
1908 London	White City Stadium	Archery, Athletics, Cycling (track), Diving, Field hockey, Football, Lacrosse, Rugby union, Swimming, Tug of war, Water polo (final), Wrestling	97,000.	
1912 Stockholm	Stockholm Olympic Stadium	Athletics, Equestrian, Football (final), Modern pentathlon (running), Tug of war, Wrestling	33,000.	
1920 Antwerp	Olympisch Stadion	Athletics, Equestrian, Field hockey, Football (final), Modern pentathlon, Rugby union, Tug of war, Weightlifting	12,771	
1924 Paris	Stade de Colombes	Athletics, Cycling (road), Equestrian, Fencing, Football (final), Modern pentathlon (fencing, running), Rugby union, Tennis	22,737	
1928 Amsterdam	Olympic Stadium	Athletics, Cycling (track), Equestrian (jumping), Football (final)	31,600	
1932 Los Angeles	Olympic Stadium	Athletics, Equestrian (eventing, jumping), Field hockey	105,000	
1936 Berlin	Dietrich Eckart Open-Air Theatre	None	20,000	
1948 London	Empress Hall, Earl's Court	Boxing, Weightlifting, Wrestling	19,000	
1952 Helsinki	Messuhalli	Basketball (final), Boxing, Weightlifting, Wrestling	5,500	
1956 Melbourne	West Melbourne Stadium	Basketball, Boxing	7,000	
1960 Rome	Baths of Caracalla	None	5,402	
1964 Tokyo	Tokyo Metropolitan Gymnasium	None	6,500	
1968 Mexico City	National Auditorium	None	12,450	
1972 Munich	Olympiahalle	None	10.563	
1976 Montreal	Montreal Forum	Basketball (final), Boxing (final), Handball (final), Volleyball (final)	18,000	
1980 Moscow	Sports Palace	Judo	11,500	
1984 Los Angeles	Pauley Pavilion	None	12,829	
1988 Seoul	Olympic Gymnastics Hall	None	14,730	
1992 Barcelona	Palau dels Esports de Barcelona (rhythmic)	Volleyball	8,000	
1992 Barcelona	Palau Sant Jordi (artistic)	Handball (final), Volleyball (final)	15,000	
1996 Atlanta	Georgia Dome (artistic)	Basketball (final), Handball (men's final)	34,500 (each side)	
1996 Atlanta	University of Georgia Coliseum (rhythmic)	Volleyball (indoor)	10,000	
2000 Sydney	Sydney SuperDome (artistic, trampolining)	Basketball (final)	21,000	
2000 Sydney	The Dome and Exhibition Complex (rhythmic)	Badminton, Handball, Modern pentathlon (fencing, shooting), Volleyball (indoor)	10,000	
2004 Athens	Galatsi Olympic Hall (rhythmic)	Table tennis	Not listed.	
2004 Athens	Olympic Indoor Hall (artistic, trampolining)	Basketball (final)	19,250	
2008 Beijing	Beijing National Indoor Stadium (artistic, trampoline)	Handball (final)	19,000	
2008 Beijing	Beijing University of Technology Gymnasium (rhythmic)	Badminton	7,500	
2012 London	North Greenwich Arena (artistic, trampolining)	Basketball (final)	20,000	
2012 London	Wembley Arena (rhythmic)	Badminton	6,000	
2016 Rio de Janeiro	Rio Olympic Arena	None	12,000	
2020 Tokyo	Ariake Gymnastics Centre	None	12,000	
2024 Paris	Bercy Arena (artistic, trampoline)	Basketball (finals)	15,000	
2024 Paris	Porte de La Chapelle Arena (rhythmic)	Badminton	8,000	
2028 Los Angeles	Downtown Arena (artistic, trampolining)	Boxing (finals)	18,000	
2028 Los Angeles	USC Sports Center (rhythmic)	Badminton	10,258	
2032 Brisbane	Chandler Indoor Sports Centre	None	10,000	

== Gallery of venues ==
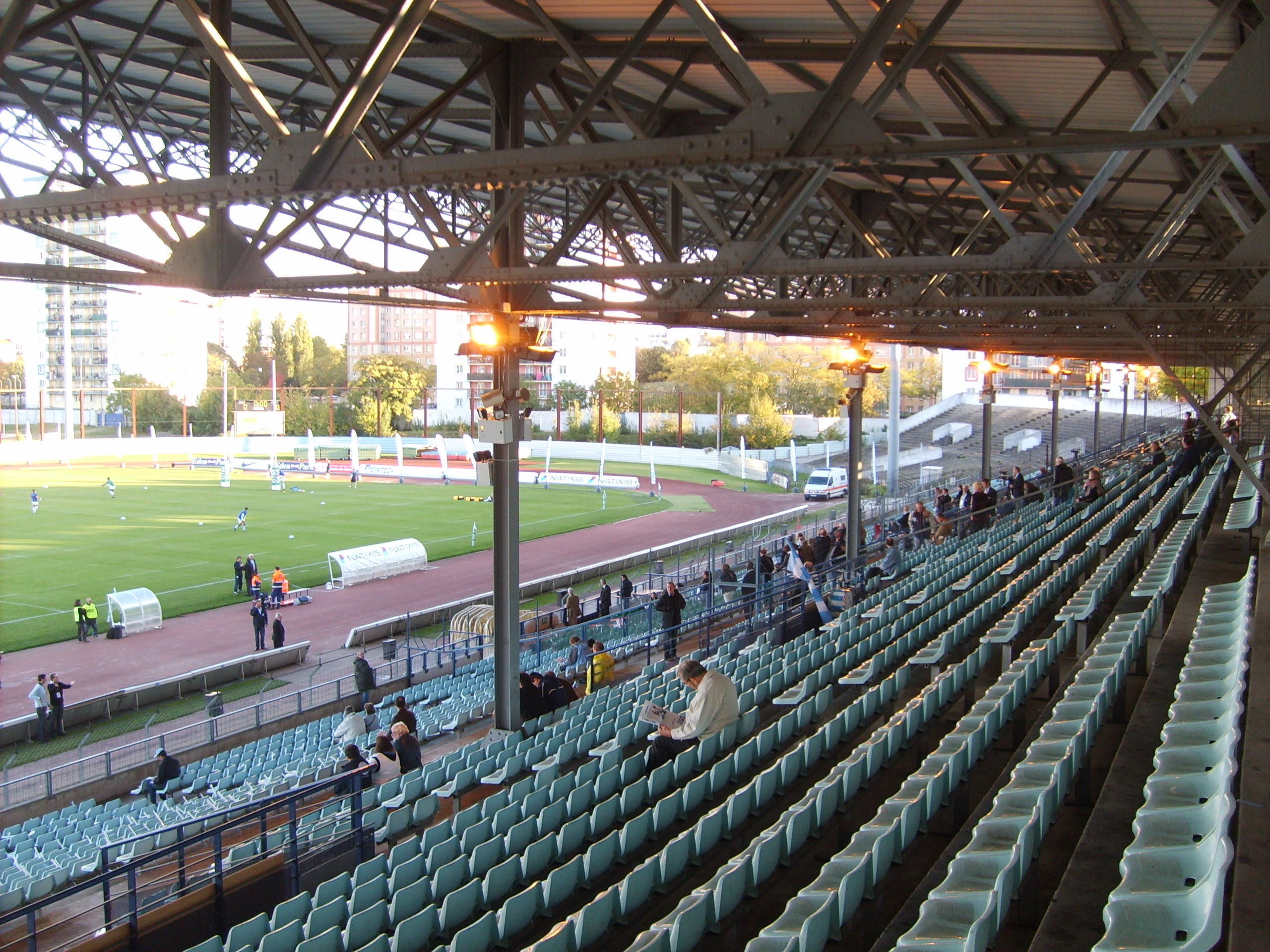
Stade de Colombes hosted gymnastics at the 1924 Summer Olympics in Paris.

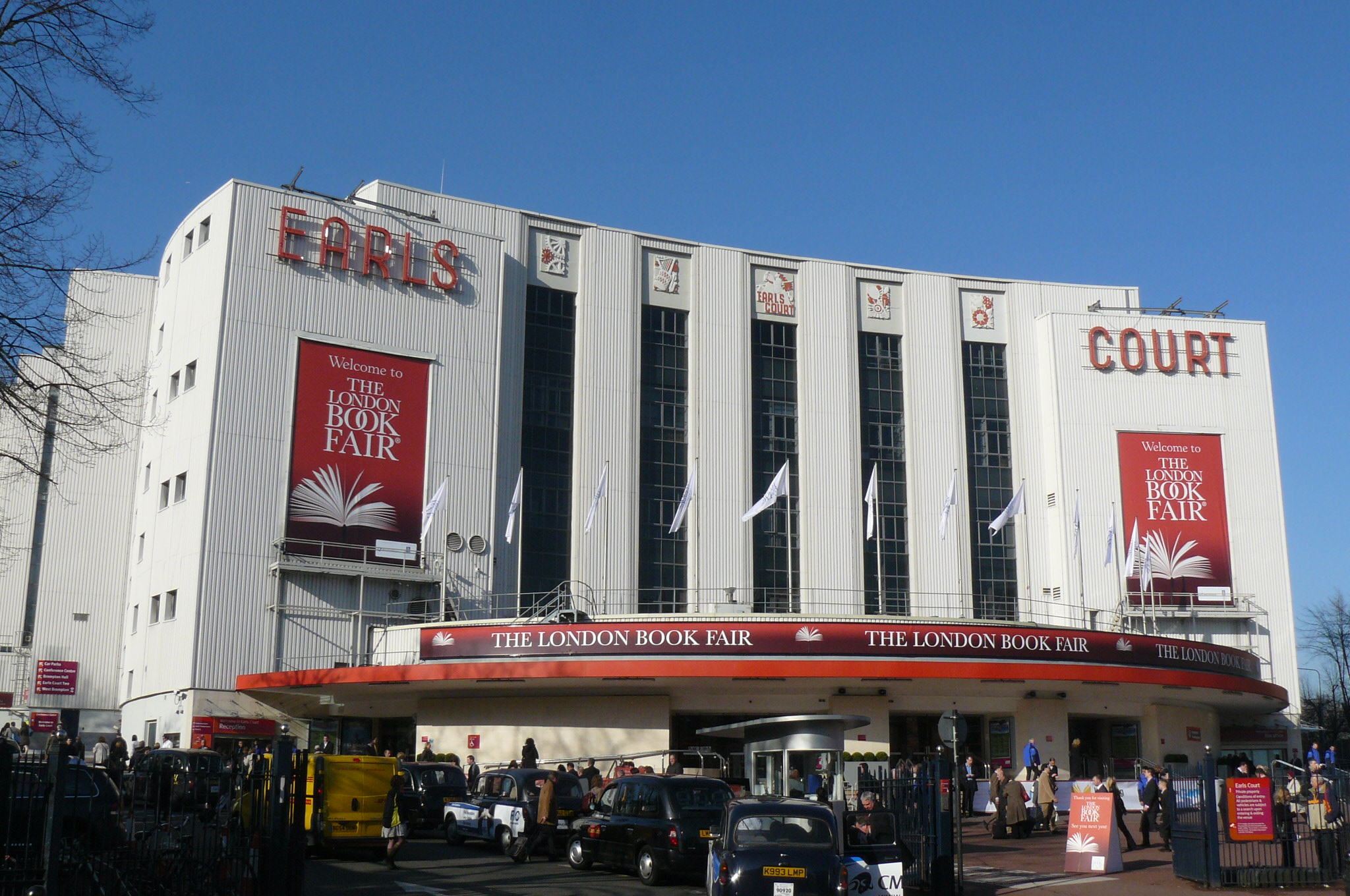
Earls Court hosted gymnastics at the 1948 Summer Olympics in London.

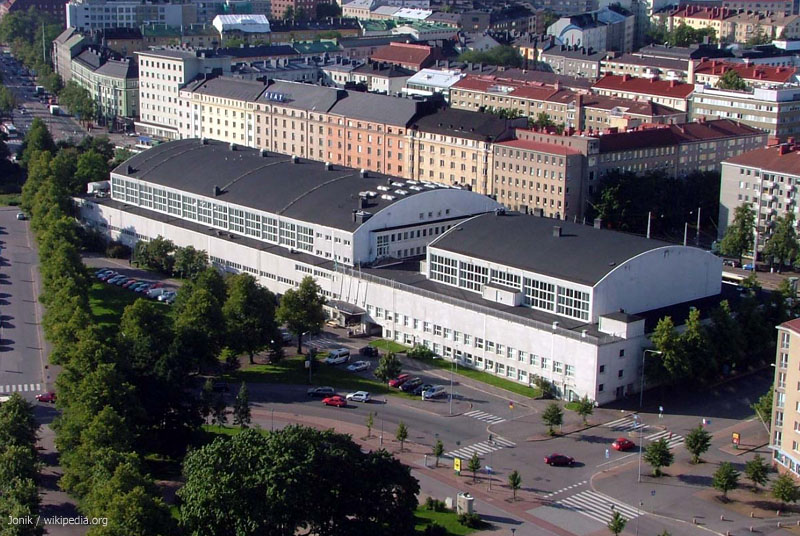
Messuhalli hosted gymnastics at the 1952 Summer Olympics in Helsinki.

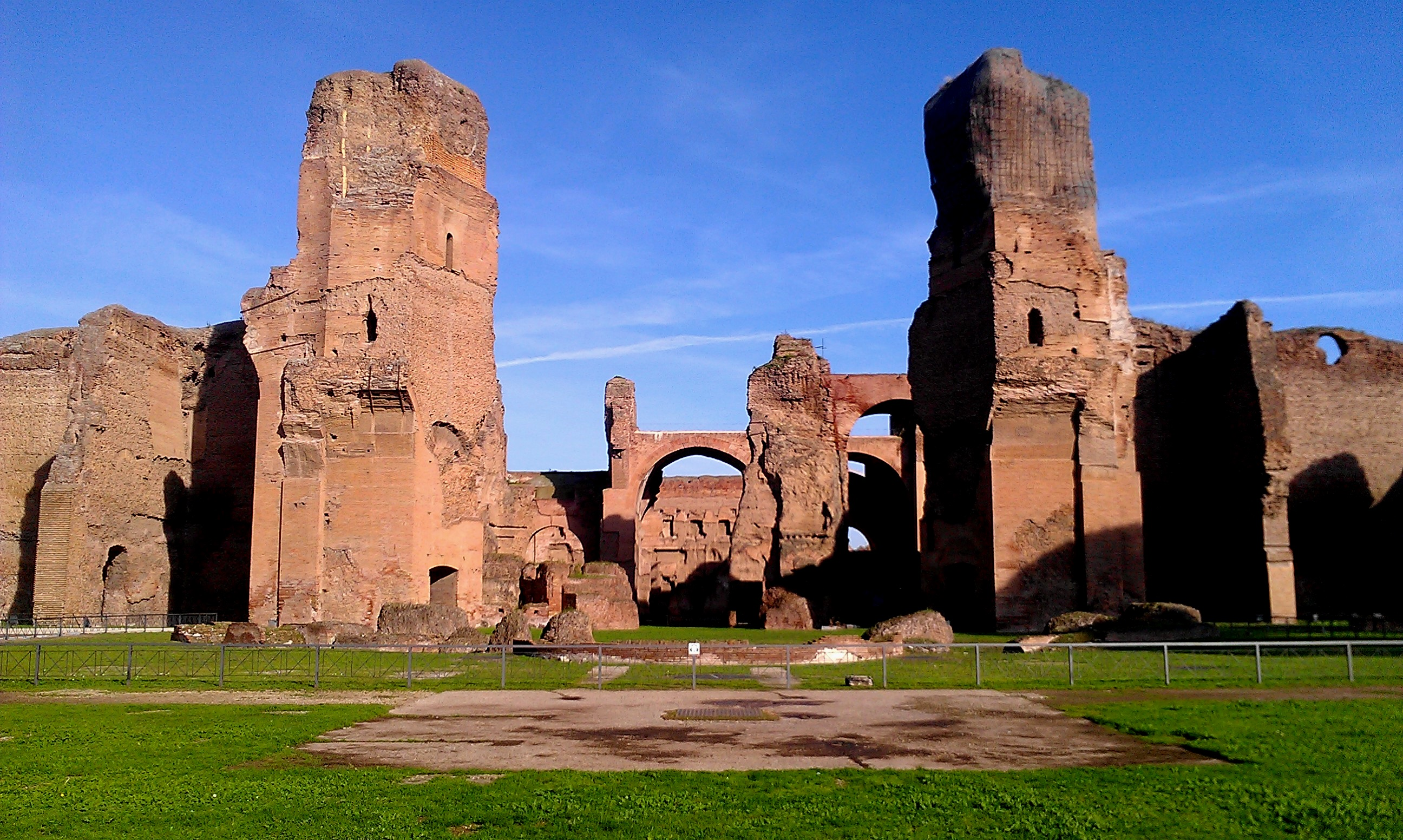
The Baths of Caracalla hosted gymnastics at the 1960 Summer Olympics in Rome.

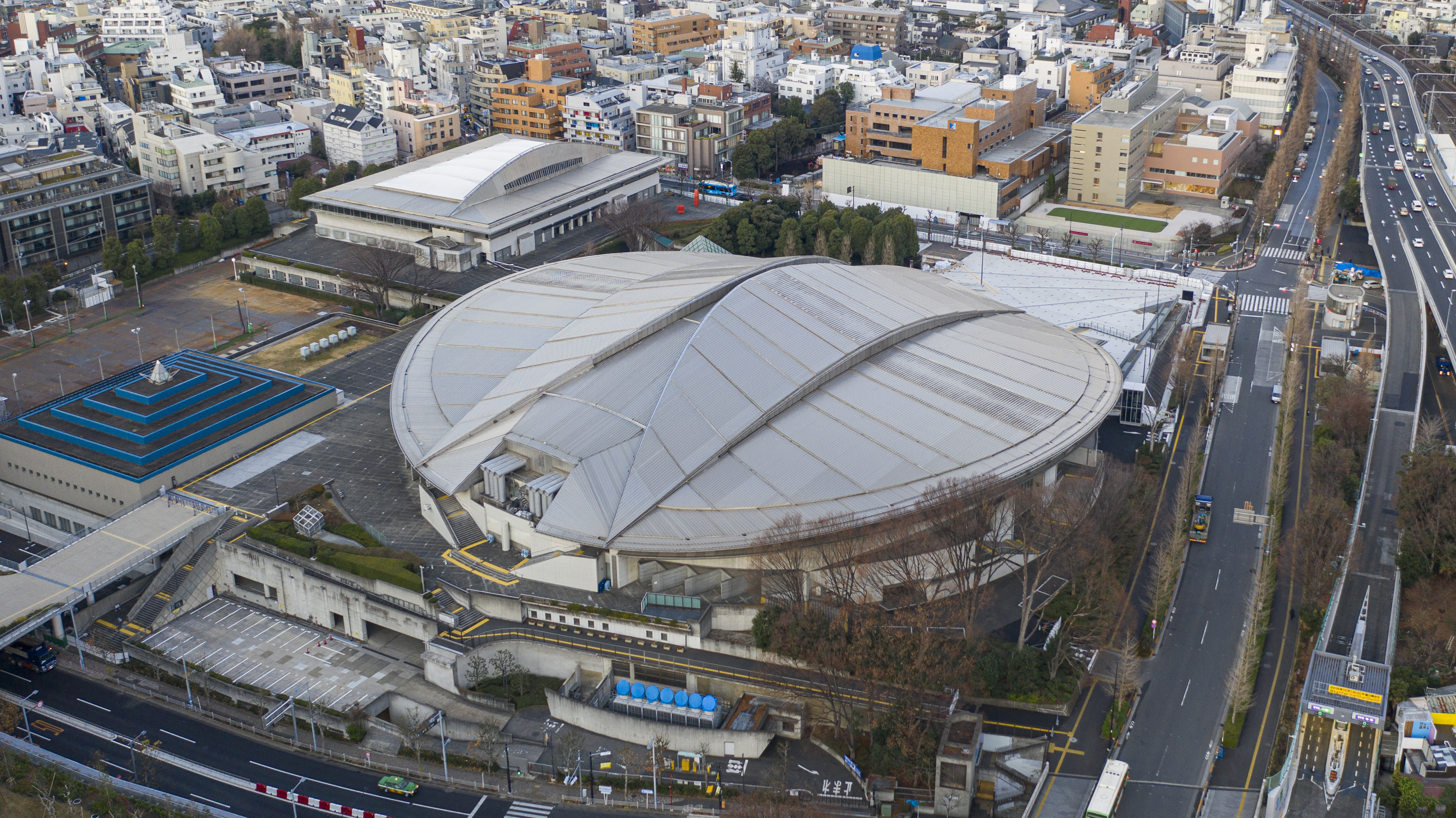
Tokyo Metropolitan Gymnasium hosted gymnastics at the 1964 Summer Olympics.

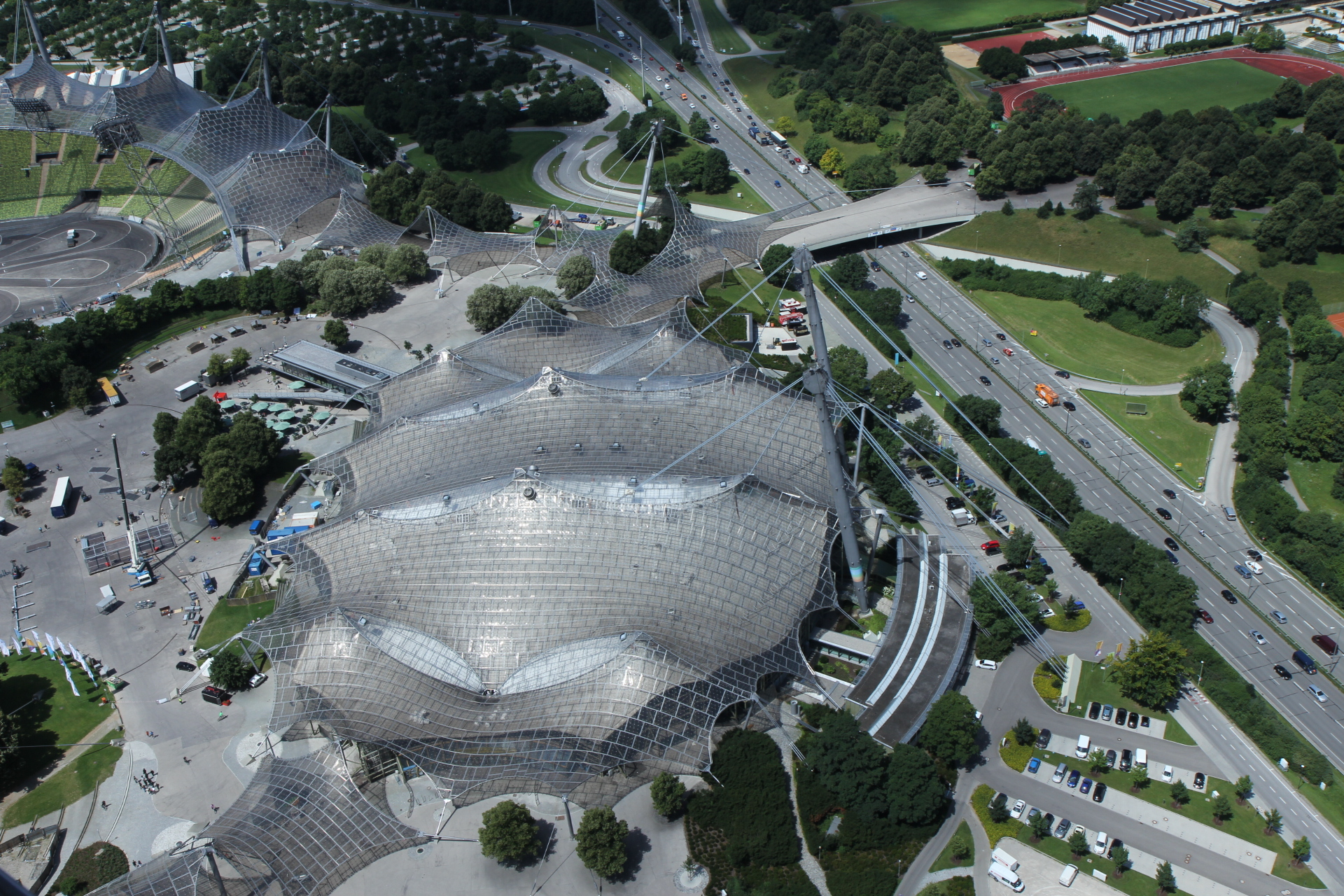
The Olympiahalle hosted gymnastics at the 1972 Summer Olympics in Munich.

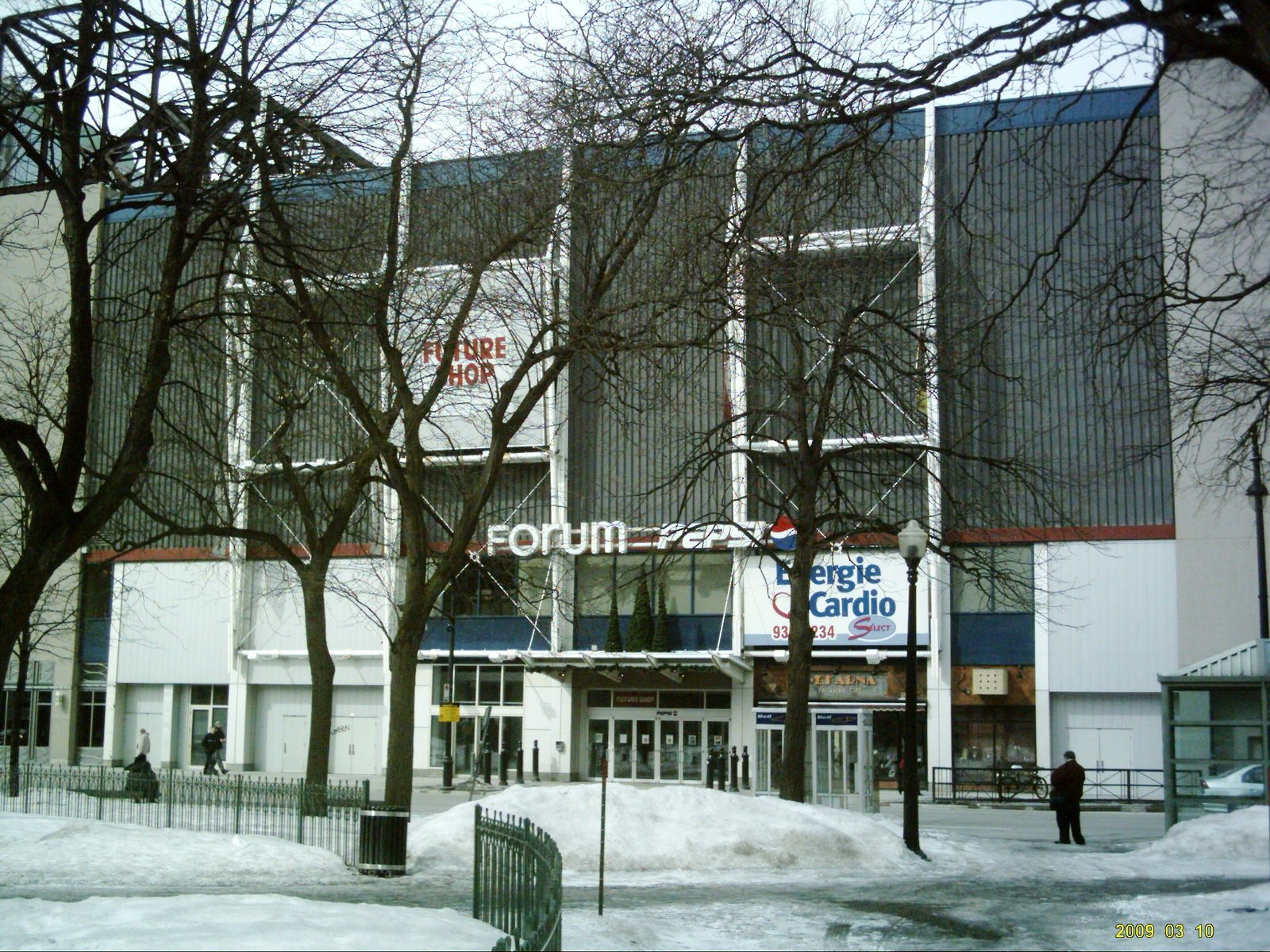
The Montreal Forum hosted gymnastics at the 1976 Summer Olympics.

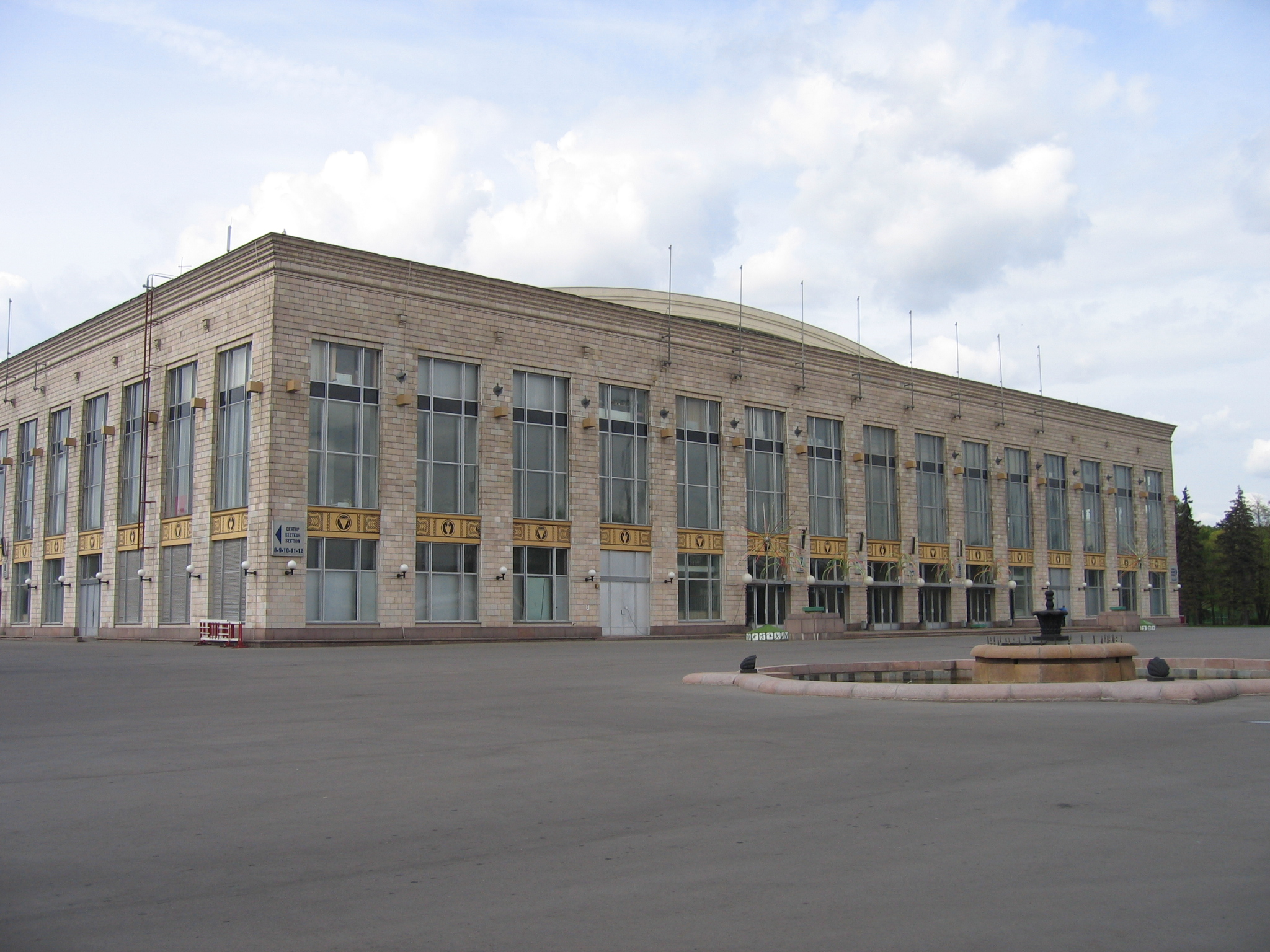
Luzhniki Palace of Sports hosted gymnastics at the 1980 Summer Olympics in Moscow.

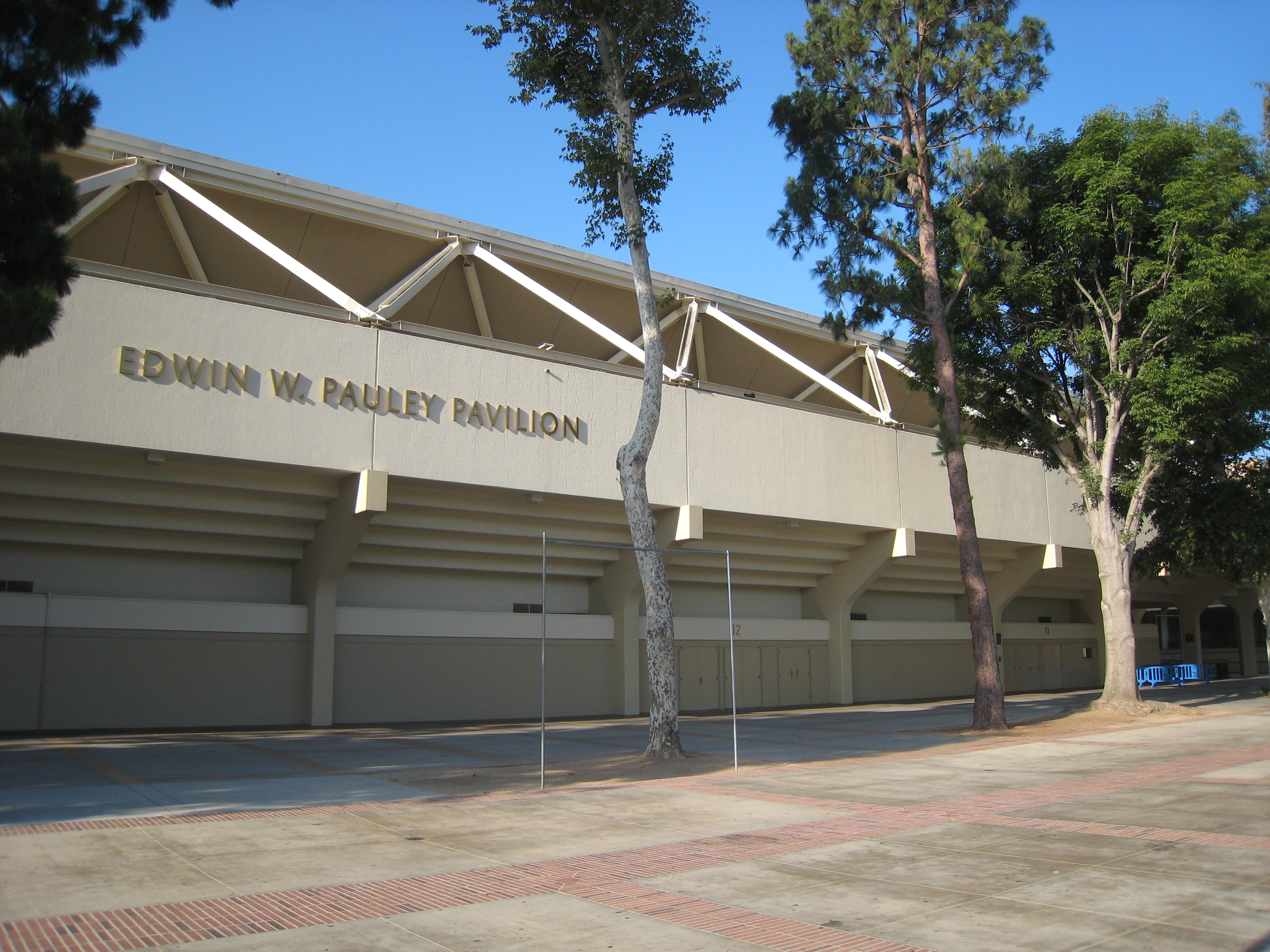
Pauley Pavilion hosted gymnastics at the 1984 Summer Olympics in Los Angeles.

The Olympic Gymnastics Arena hosted gymnastics at the 1988 Summer Olympics in Seoul.

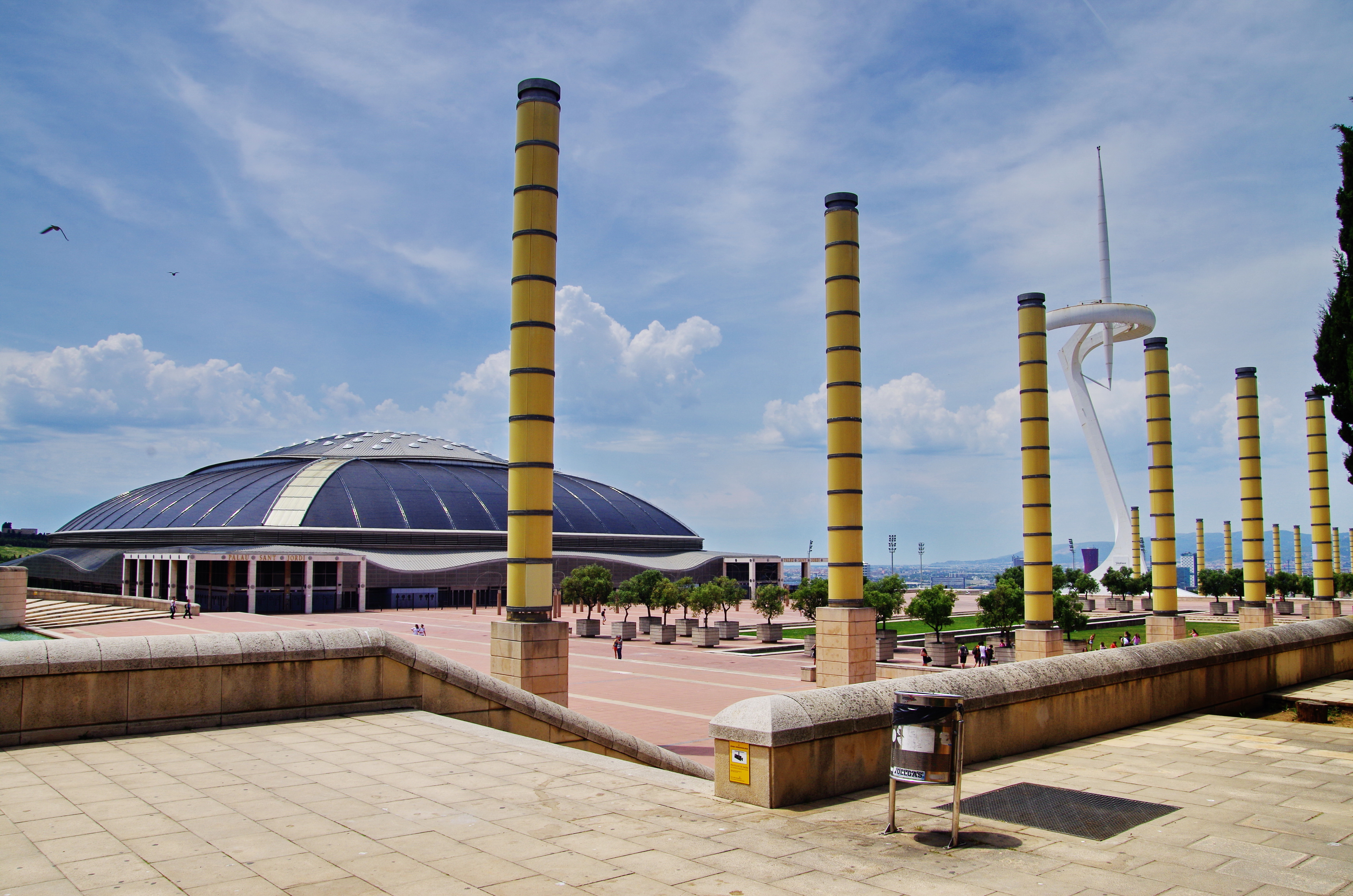
Palau Sant Jordi hosted artistic gymnastics at the 1992 Summer Olympics in Barcelona.

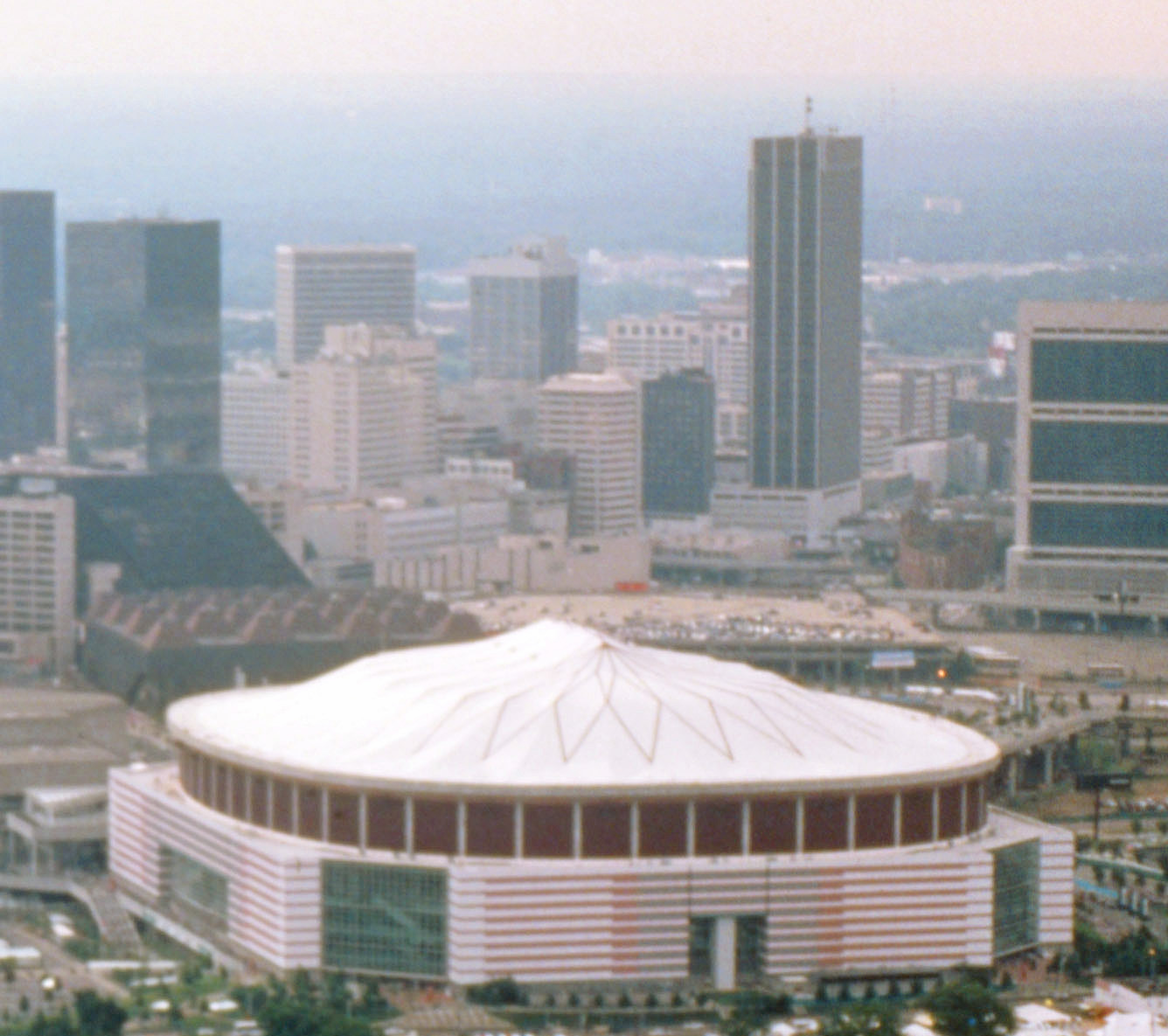
The Georgia Dome hosted gymnastics at the 1996 Summer Olympics in Atlanta.

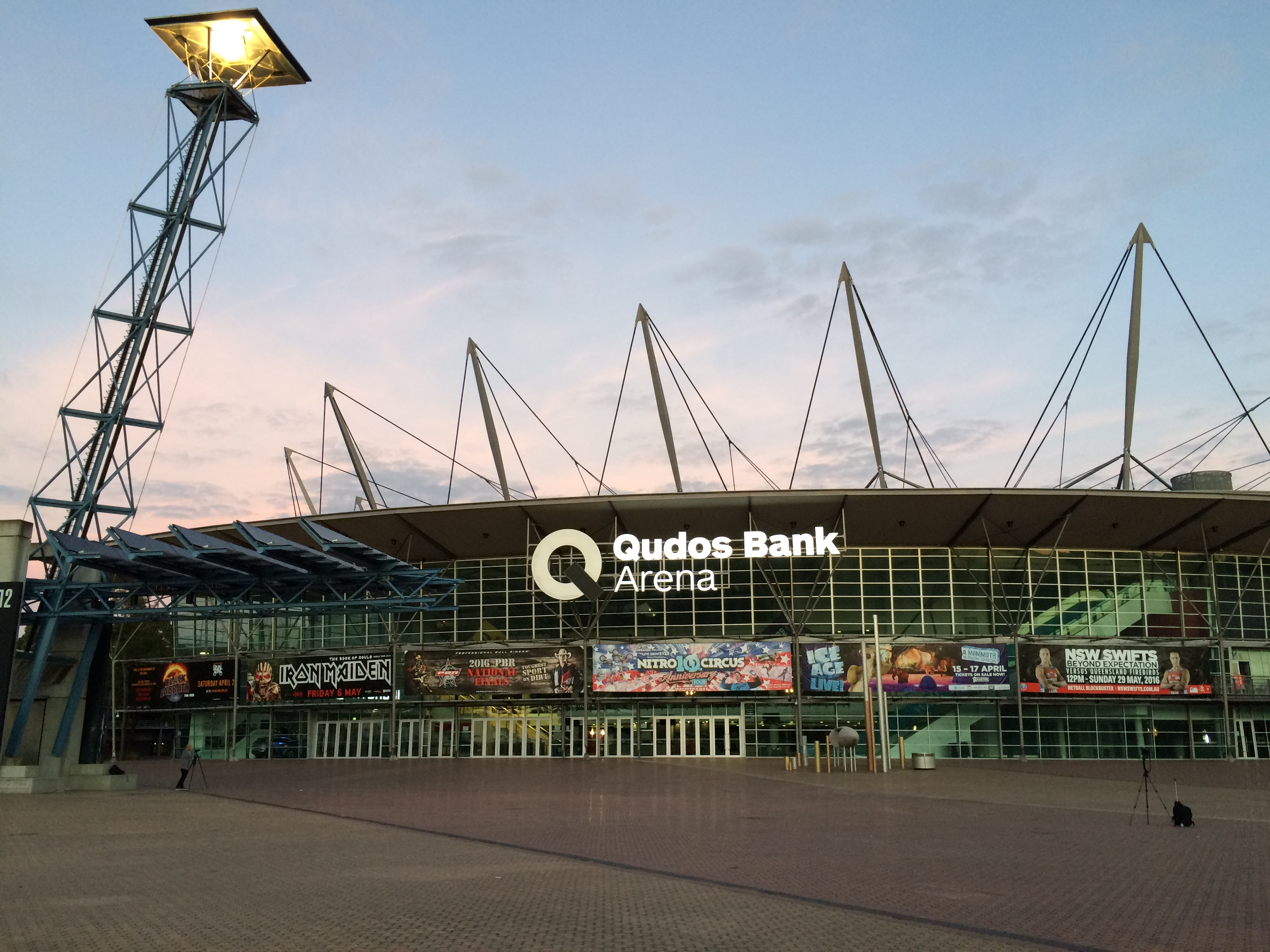
The Sydney SuperDome hosted artistic gymnastics at the 2000 Summer Olympics.

Telekom Center Athens hosted artistic gymnastics at the 2004 Summer Olympics in Athens.

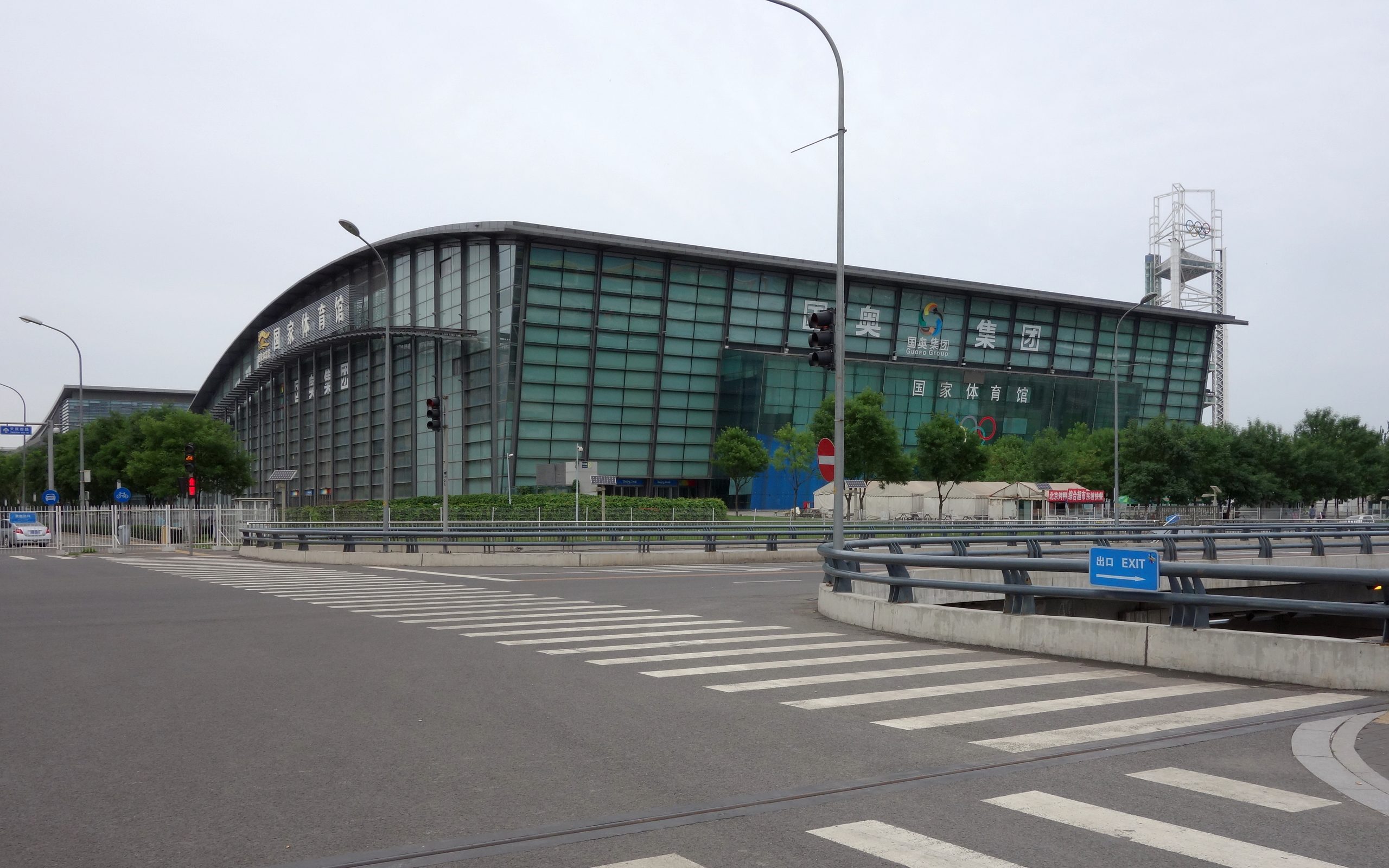
The National Indoor Stadium hosted artistic gymnastics at the 2008 Summer Olympics in Beijing

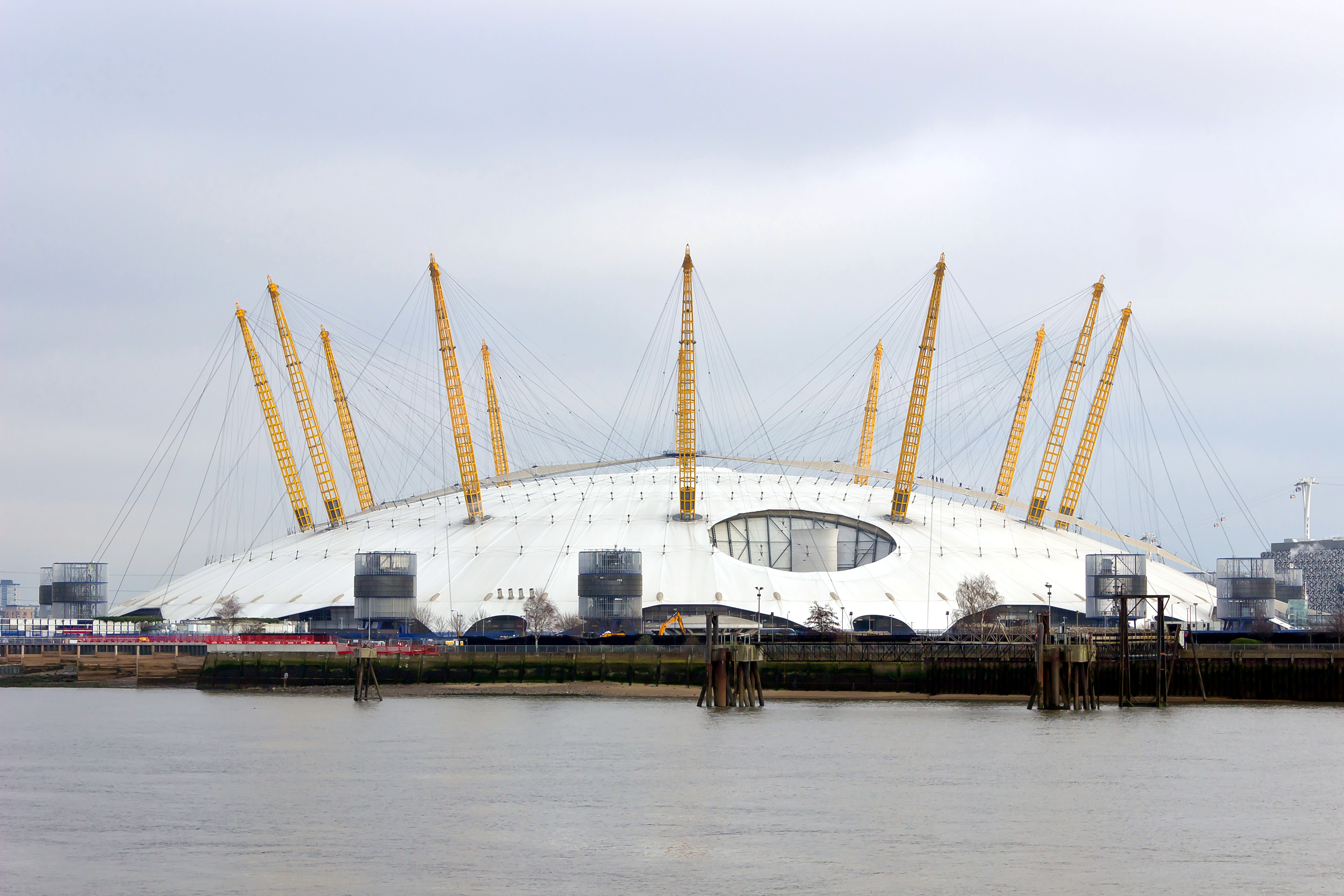
The O2 Arena hosted artistic gymnastics at the 2012 Summer Olympics in London.

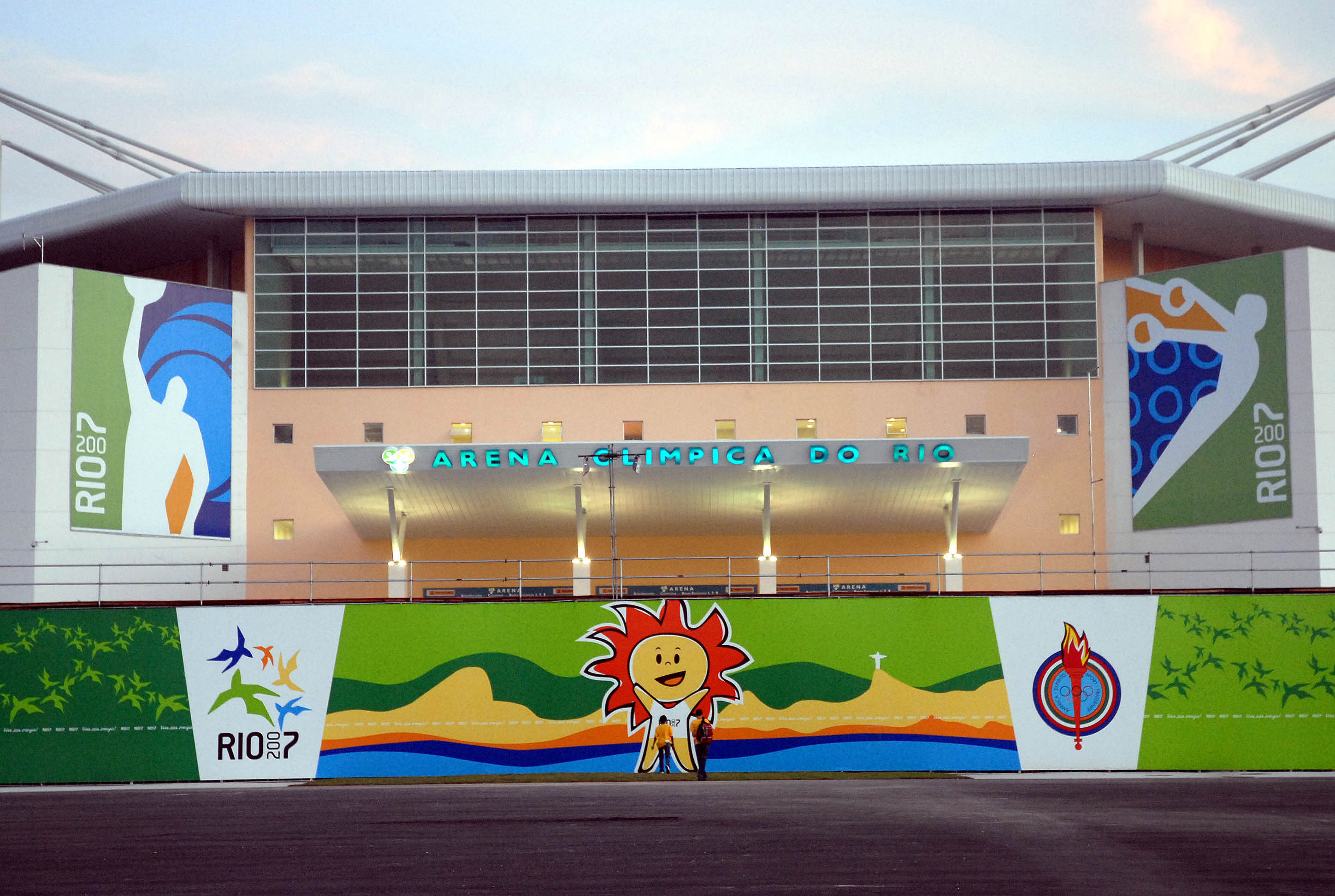
Farmasi Arena hosted gymnastics at the 2016 Summer Olympics in Rio de Janeiro.

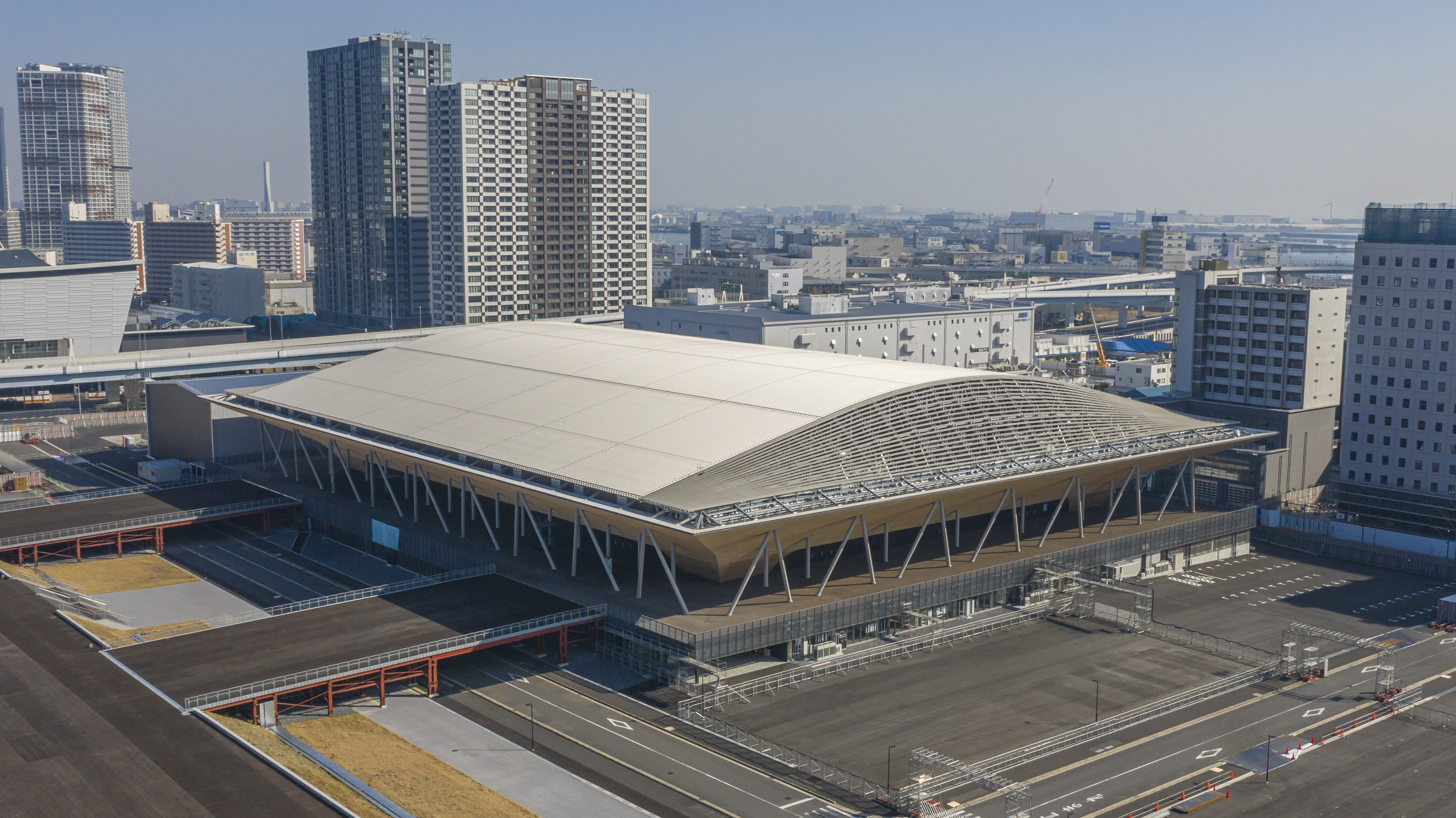
The Ariake Gymnastics Centre hosted gymnastics at the 2020 Summer Olympics in Tokyo.

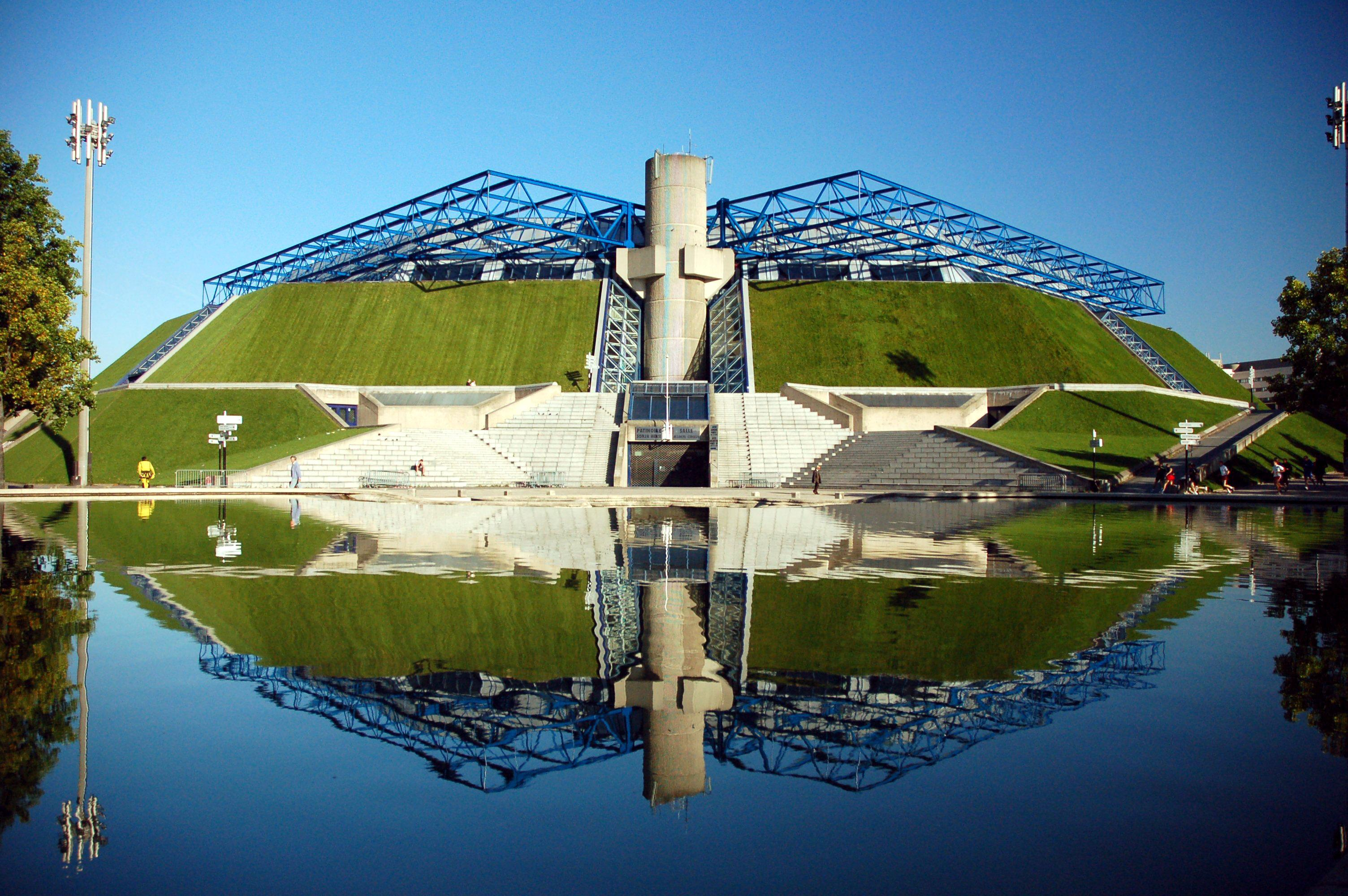
The Accor Arena hosted artistic gymnastics at the 2024 Summer Olympics in Paris.

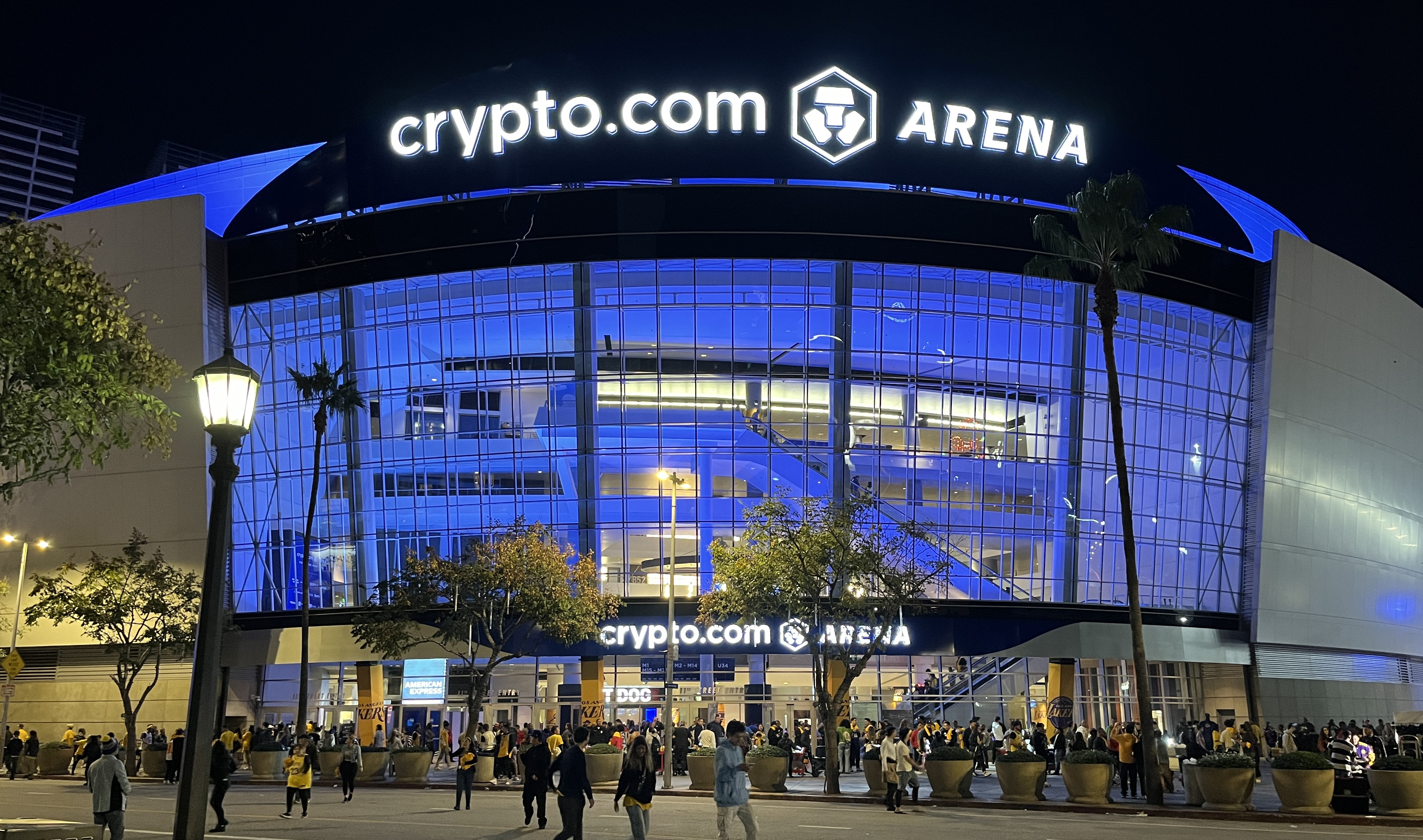
The Crypo.com Arena will host artistic gymnastics at the 2028 Summer Olympics in Los Angeles.
