= Ken Davies (footballer) =

English footballer (1923–2008)

- Kenneth Davies Wolverhampton Wanderers 1944-46

Personal information
- Full name: Kenneth Davies
- Date of birth: 20 September 1923
- Place of birth: Doncaster, England
- Date of death: 14 November 2008 (aged 85)
- Place of death: Exeter, England
- Height: 5 ft 6 in (1.68 m)
- Position: Winger

Senior career*
Years	Team	Apps	(Gls)
1944–1946	Wolverhampton Wanderers	2	(2)
1946–1948	Walsall	28	(5)
1948–1950	Brighton & Hove Albion	36	(5)
1950–1958	Chippenham Town		
- * Club domestic league appearances and goals

Kenneth Davies (20 September 1923 – 14 November 2008) was an English professional footballer who played as a winger in the Football League for Walsall and Brighton & Hove Albion.

== Life and career ==
Davies was born in Doncaster, West Riding of Yorkshire, in 1923. He played junior football along with Billy Woodcock, brother of Bruce who would become British Heavyweight Boxing Champion and continued in the position of centre forward at Oswin Avenue School. He qualified at Doncaster Plant works as a coppersmith working on such legendary engines as The Silver Link, The Flying Scotsman and The Mallard. As war loomed, this would become a reserved occupation, so Davies was never enlisted. He played football for the plant team and after one of the games was approached by Mark Crook, offering the opportunity to become a professional footballer. He joined Wath Wanderers and spent time at the nursery club before playing for the parent club Wolverhampton Wanderers in wartime football 1944–46. He scored his first goal playing against Aston Villa at Villa Park playing alongside Billy Wright. He moved on to Walsall of the Third Division South ahead of the 1946–47 Football League season for a £600 fee. He scored 5 goals from 28 league appearances over two seasons, and then moved on to another Southern Section club, Brighton & Hove Albion for a £250 fee, where he played 38 league matches over two years, again scoring 5 goals. Together with three Brighton teammates, Eric Lancelotte, Fred Leamon and Jock Sim, he signed for Chippenham Town in 1950. He helped Chippenham win the 1951–52 Western League title, finish as runners-up three years later, and was still with them in the 1956–57 season.

Davies died in Exeter in 2008 at the age of 85.
