= John Symes =

John Symes may refer to:

- John Symes (cricketer) (1879–1944), English cricketer
- John Symes (politician, born 1573) (1573–1661), English politician and lawyer
- John Symes Berkeley (1663–1736), English Member of Parliament
- John Foster Symes (1878–1951), United States district judge

== See also ==
- John Sims (disambiguation)
- John Simms (disambiguation)
