= Jock Sim =

Scottish footballer (1922–2000)

Personal information
- Full name: John Sim
- Date of birth: 4 December 1922
- Place of birth: Glasgow, Scotland
- Date of death: 14 January 2000 (aged 77)
- Place of death: Chippenham, England
- Height: 5 ft 9 in (1.75 m)
- Positions: Centre forward; left half

Senior career*
Years	Team	Apps	(Gls)
1946	St Roch's		
1946	Kirkintilloch Rob Roy		
1946–1950	Brighton & Hove Albion	32	(5)
1950–1951	Chippenham Town		
1951–1952	Plymouth Argyle	0	(0)
1952–1955	Chippenham Town		
- Calne Town
- * Club domestic league appearances and goals

John Sim (4 December 1922 – 14 January 2000), known as Jock, Jackie, or Johnny Sim, was a Scottish professional footballer who played as a centre forward or left half in the Football League for Brighton & Hove Albion.

== Life and career ==
Sim was born in Glasgow in 1922. During the Second World War, he served abroad for five years. Afterwards, he joined Kirkintilloch Rob Roy from another junior club, St Roch's, early in the 1946–47 season, scored freely, and within weeks was reportedly "in almost as great a demand as nylon stockings." He signed for English club Brighton & Hove Albion on 24 October, and scored on his Third Division South debut three weeks later. He had a run in the side in his first season, but injury disrupted his career: he was restricted to just 14 appearances in the next two seasons and none at all in 1949–50.

Ahead of the following campaign, he signed for Chippenham Town, together with three Brighton teammates, Eric Lancelotte, Fred Leamon and Ken Davies. In March 1951, as part of the Western League record transfer that took Rex Tilley to Plymouth Argyle, Sim returned to the Football League, but he never played first-team football for Argyle and was soon back with Chippenham. He stayed for three seasons, but turned down the terms offered for a fourth and was released. He later played for Calne Town.

Sim died in Chippenham in 2000 at the age of 77.
