= John Sim =

John Sim (or similar) may refer to:

== Politics ==
- John Symme, 14th-century English politician, MP for Canterbury
- John Peter Sim (1917–2015), Australian politician known as Peter Sim

== Sports ==
- Jock Sim (John Sim, 1922–2000), Scottish footballer (Brighton & Hove Albion)
- Johnny Simm (1929–2018), English footballer (Bolton Wanderers, Bury, Bradford City)
- Jon Sim (born 1977), Canadian ice hockey player

== Others ==
- John Simm (born 1970), English actor
- Jack Sim, Singaporean businessman

== See also ==
- John Sims (disambiguation)
