= John Simms =

John Simms may refer to:

- John Simms (clergyman) (1854–1934), Northern Irish Presbyterian clergyman, British Army chaplain, and Unionist politician
- Jack Simms (1903–?), English footballer
- John F. Simms (1916–1975), American politician, Governor of New Mexico, 1955–1957

== See also ==
- John Simm (born 1970), British actor
- John Sims (disambiguation)
- John Symes (disambiguation)
