= John Sims =

John Sims may refer to:

- John Sims (taxonomist) (1749-1831), physician and botanist
- John Sims (footballer), English former professional footballer
- John Joseph Sims, English recipient of the Victoria Cross
- John Sims Jr., Kentucky politician

== See also ==
- John Simms (disambiguation)
- John Sim (disambiguation)
- John Symes (disambiguation)
