= William Attrill =

British sportsman

Willian Dunbar Attrill
Personal information
- National team: France
- Born: March 1868 Northwood, Isle of Wight, England
- Died: 1939 (aged 70–71) Edmonton, London, England

Achievements and titles
- Olympic finals: 1900 Olympics: Two-day 12-man – Silver

Olympic medal record

Representing France

Men's Cricket
Silver medal – second place	1900 Paris	Two-day 12-man

William Dunbar Attrill (March 1868 – 1939) was a British sportsman. He was the first captain of Standard Athletic Club's football team, leading the Parisian club in 1894 to the first French football title. He was also a member of the silver medal-winning French cricket team at the 1900 Summer Olympics, the only time cricket has featured in the Olympics. In the only game against Great Britain, he was dismissed for a duck in both French innings, took two wickets in Great Britain's first innings, and two catches in their second.

He also competed in bicycle and automobile races.
