= C. B. K. Beachcroft =

British cricketer (1870–1928)

Olympic medal record

Representing United Kingdom

Men's Cricket
Gold medal – first place	1900 Paris	Two-day 12-man

Charles B. K. Beachcroft (born Charles Beachey Kay; 21 January 1870 – 1 July 1928) was an English cricketer who was captain of the tournament-winning Devon and Somerset Wanderers team that represented Great Britain at the 1900 Summer Olympics, the only time cricket has been an Olympic sport.

== Personal life ==
Beachcroft was the son of a vicar, John Lowder Kay, and Elizabeth Beachey. He was born on 21 January 1870 at Rickmansworth, Hertfordshire. His father died in 1877 and Charles and his mother moved to Devon. He grew up to become a county level player in rugby, hockey and cricket, introduced the game of ping-pong to the county, and also competed in shooting. He played as opening bat for Exeter and various other local cricket teams, including Starcross. He married a local girl in 1889 and had four children before being arrested for abduction of a 17-year-old girl. The following year he married this girl, returned to Devon and took on the license of the Royal Hotel, Dawlish, under the name of C. B. Kay Beachcroft.

In the 1901 census his occupation is listed as a licensed victualler. His biography (One of Life's Great Charmers: A Biography of Charles Kay) shows that he was later declared bankrupt. In 1905, under the name of Charles Kay, he joined the stage and became a variety artist, humorist, comedian, actor, pantomime villain and touring theatre company manager, touring Stoll Moss theatres throughout England and Scotland over 16 years with different stage assistants/partners (Sybil Franklin, Lola Trent and Sadie Logan) and fathering a total of 13 children. He emigrated to Australia in 1921 and toured theatres in Australia and New Zealand until his death in Melbourne in 1928.

== Athletic career ==
In the only match of the Olympics against France, he scored 23 runs in the first innings and 54 in the second.
