= Eric Lancelotte =

British footballer

Personal information
- Full name: Eric Charles Lancelotte
- Date of birth: 26 February 1917
- Place of birth: Jhansi, India
- Date of death: 1 September 2007 (aged 90)
- Place of death: Canterbury, England
- Height: 5 ft 11 in (1.80 m)
- Position: Inside forward

Youth career
- Charlton Athletic

Senior career*
Years	Team	Apps	(Gls)
- Romford
1935–1948	Charlton Athletic	40	(6)
1948–1950	Brighton & Hove Albion	60	(14)
1950–1951	Chippenham Town		
1951–195?	Hastings United		
1952–1953	Ashford Town	40	(8)
- Folkestone Town
- * Club domestic league appearances and goals

Eric Charles Lancelotte (26 February 1917 – 1 September 2007) was a British professional footballer who made 100 Football League appearances playing as an inside forward for Charlton Athletic and Brighton & Hove Albion either side of the Second World War. He also played non-league football for Romford, Chippenham Town, Hastings United, Ashford Town (Kent) and Folkestone Town.

== Life and career ==
Lancelotte was born in 1917 in Jhansi, India, where his father was a regimental sergeant major, and raised in the Woolwich area of London. He began his football career with Romford, signed for Charlton Athletic on amateur forms in 1933, and turned professional in 1935. He made his debut in 1937, but his career was interrupted by the Second World War. He served in the RAF, made guest appearances for clubs including Millwall, Stockport County and Watford, and was a member of tour parties that played football matches to entertain the troops. He returned to Charlton after the war, and contributed to their 1946–47 FA Cup run, but lost his place before the semi-final and took no part in the final.

After 60 First Division appearances by February 1948, Lancelotte moved on to Brighton & Hove Albion of the Third Division South for a club record fee of £3,250. A clever, creative player rather than a goalscorer, he was an Albion regular for 18 months, but lost that role to Johnny McNichol, requested a transfer, and moved into non-league football. He played for clubs including Chippenham Town, Hastings United, Ashford Town and Folkestone Town, before acting as assistant manager of Bexleyheath & Welling.

He lived in Whitstable in later life, and died in Canterbury in 2007 at the age of 90.
