= Philip Tomalin =

French cricketer

Olympic medal record

Representing France

Men's Cricket
| Silver medal – second place | 1900 Paris | Two-day 12-man |

Philip Humphreys Tomalin (10 April 1856–12 February 1940) was a British-French sportsman and sports administrator.

Tomalin was born in Kensington. He was member of the Norse Rowing Club in Richmond, and the Carlton Cricket Club that played at Regent's park before he left for France at the age of 21. He remained in France until 1939, returning to England where he died the following year in Bognor Regis.

Tomalin served as president of the Standard Athletic Club in Paris from 1892 to 1939. He organised, and was the captain of, the French cricket team at the 1900 Summer Olympics, the only time to date that cricket has featured in the Olympics; there was only one match played, which was won by Great Britain. In 1932, he was appointed a chevalier of the Legion d'Honneur. He was also a member of the Ordre des Palmes académiques.
