= William Donne (cricketer) =

English cricketer

Olympic medal record

Representing United Kingdom

Men's Cricket
Gold medal – first place	1900 Paris	Two-day 12-man

William Stephens Donne (2 April 1875 in Wincanton, Somerset – 24 March 1934 in Castle Cary, Somerset) was an English cricket player, and former president of the Rugby Football Union, and was a member of the cricket team that won a gold medal at the 1900 Summer Olympics.

== Cricket career ==
Donne was one of the founding members of the Devon and Somerset Wanderers Cricket Club, and part of the team on their first tour in 1894 of the Isle of Wight. He was also one of five players from the Castle Cary Cricket Club who represented Great Britain in cricket at the 1900 Summer Olympics. They won the gold medal in the only match against France, Donne scoring six runs before being run out in the first innings and not batting in the second innings. The Castle Cary Cricket Club marked their 175th anniversary in 2012 with a celebration of the Castle Cary players that played in 1900.

== Outside cricket ==
Donne attended King's School, Bruton, and joined the family business of rope and twine manufacturers which was founded in Castle Cary in 1797. He became an Alderman for Somerset County Council and a governor for his former school. He served as a captain in the Somerset Light Infantry during the First World War.

He was honorary secretary of the Somerset Rugby Football Union between 1897 and 1905 before becoming president from 1905 to 1934, and was the Rugby Football Union president in 1924–25.

He died at South Court, Castle Cary on 24 March 1934.
