= Fred Leamon =

British footballer (1919–1981)

Personal information
- Full name: Frederick William Leamon
- Date of birth: 11 May 1919
- Place of birth: Saint Clement, Jersey
- Date of death: 27 July 1981 (aged 62)
- Place of death: London, England
- Height: 5 ft 8 in (1.73 m)
- Position: Centre forward

Senior career*
Years	Team	Apps	(Gls)
?–1946	Bath City		
1946	Newport County	4	(3)
1946–1949	Bristol Rovers	43	(21)
1949–1950	Brighton & Hove Albion	11	(4)
1950–1951	Chippenham Town		
- * Club domestic league appearances and goals

Frederick William Leamon (11 May 1919 – 29 July 1981) was a Jersey professional footballer who played in The Football League for Newport County, Bristol Rovers and Brighton & Hove Albion, as well as an international bowls player.

Leamon was a Royal Marines commando and also played for non-League side Bath City before taking up football professionally. He joined Newport County in February 1946, and scored a remarkable 23 goals in 16 unofficial wartime matches for them. On the resumption of League football in the summer of 1946 he played just four games for Newport, scoring three times, before moving to Bristol Rovers. He scored 21 goals in 43 League games during a three-year spell with The Pirates, and also scored four times in eleven games for Brighton & Hove Albion during the 1949–50 season. He then spent a year with non-League Chippenham Town before finally hanging up his boots in 1951.

As well as playing football, Leamon was an accomplished bowls player, representing Wales over twenty times in international competitions, despite being born in Jersey. In Jersey as a young boy, he won the Jersey Cap for Football

In later life he worked as a security guard for the BBC, and it was while working in this capacity that he suffered a heart attack at St Paul's Cathedral during the wedding of Prince Charles and Lady Diana. Despite attempts by a policeman to resuscitate him, he died on the steps of St Paul's Cathedral.
