= France national cricket team =

France
- Association: France Cricket

Personnel
- Captain: Gustav McKeon
- Coach: (Netherlands) Tim de Leede

International Cricket Council
- ICC status: Associate member with T20I status (1998)
- ICC region: Europe
| ICC Rankings | Current | Best-ever |
| T20I | 49th | 39th (6 Aug 2021) |

International cricket
- First international: France v. Great Britain (United Kingdom) (Paris; 19 August 1900)

One Day Internationals
- World Cup Qualifier appearances: 1 (first in 2001)
- Best result: First round, 2001

T20 Internationals
- First T20I: v Norway at Bayer Uerdingen Cricket Ground, Krefeld; 5 August 2021
- Last T20I: v Romania at Moara Vlasei Cricket Ground, Ilfov County; 30 July 2026
| T20Is | Played | Won/Lost |
| Total | 53 | 27/25 (1 tie, 0 no results) |
| This year | 18 | 11/7 (0 ties, 0 no results) |
T20I kit
- As of 30 July 2026

The France national cricket team is the men's team that represents France in international cricket. They became an associate member of the International Cricket Council (ICC) in 1998, having previously been an affiliate member since 1987. The country's national team is best known for winning the silver medal in the cricket event at the 1900 Summer Olympics in Paris, the only time a cricket competition has been held at the Olympics. France now plays most of its matches in European Cricket Council (ECC) tournaments, although the team also appeared at the 2001 ICC Trophy.

In April 2018, the ICC decided to grant full Twenty20 International (T20I) status to all its members. Therefore, all Twenty20 matches played between France and other ICC members after 1 January 2019 have the full T20I status.

== History ==
=== Early years ===
One of the many theories about the origin of cricket is that France could be a possible birthplace of the game: a mention of a bat and ball game called "criquet" in a village of the Pas-de-Calais occurs in a French manuscript of 1478, and "criquet" is an old French word meaning "post" or "wicket". However, it is also possible that this could be an early variant of croquet.

Horace Walpole, son of former British Prime Minister Robert Walpole mentioned seeing cricket in Paris in 1766.

The Marylebone Cricket Club (MCC) were due to make the first ever international cricket tour of France, in 1789, however this was cancelled due to the French Revolution. This match was finally played in 1989, as part of the bicentennial celebrations of the revolution, with France beating the MCC by 7 wickets.

The first documented match took place in the Bois de Boulogne between Paris Cricket Club and Nottingham Amateurs in 1864. The Paris Cricket Club published a book explaining the game the following year.

=== Olympic Games ===
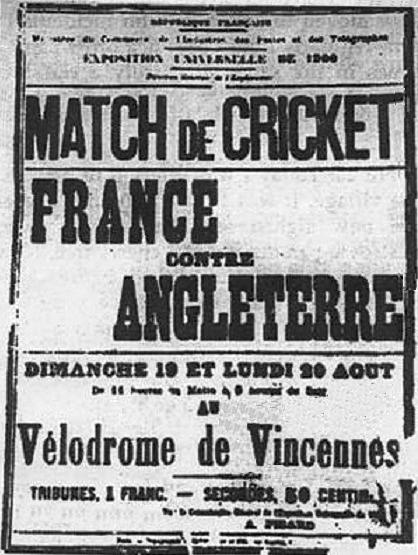
Poster for the 1900 Summer Olympics cricket match

The first, and so far only, appearance of cricket at the Olympic Games took place in 1900, with the French team losing the only match played to Great Britain: France therefore remain the reigning silver medalist until 2028, when cricket will return to the Olympic Games (in the Twenty20 format).

The French team, however, consisted of ten British residents in Paris and two Frenchmen, members of the Standard Athletic Club. The match was twelve-a-side, and the following players represented France:

- Philip Tomalin (captain)
- William Anderson
- William Attrill
- John Braid
- W. Browning (wicket-keeper)
- Robert Horne
- Timothée Jordan
- Arthur MacEvoy
- Douglas Robinson
- H. F. Roques
- Alfred Schneidau
- Henry Terry

19–20 August 1900
Scorecard

| (United Kingdom) Great Britain | v | France |
| 117; Frederick Cuming 38; William Anderson 4/27 | | 78; John Braid 25; Frederick Christian 7/19 |
| 145/5d Alfred Bowerman 59; F. Roques 3/29 | | 26; William Anderson 8 Montagu Toller 7/9 |

Great Britain won by 158 runs
Exhibition Ground, Vélodrome de Vincennes
Umpires: Delorme (Fra) and Wilian (Fra)

- No toss
- First ever international match for France.

The Standard Athletic Club restaged the 1900 Olympic cricket match in 1987, and France played the MCC in Meudon in 1989.

In 1910, France took part in an exhibition tournament in Brussels, also involving the MCC, the Netherlands and Belgium. They played one game, against the Netherlands, winning by 63 runs.

=== The modern era ===
Many cricket clubs folded after the Second World War, but an influx of English and Asian immigrants led to a resurgence of the game in the early 1980s. The current French Cricket Association was formed in 1987, and they gained Affiliate membership of the ICC the same year.

After the win in the 1989 match mentioned above, there were a handful of tours from English county teams, and France toured Austria in 1996, losing both matches against the national team. In 1997, they played in the European Nations Cup in Zuoz, Switzerland, winning after beating Germany by one run in the final. This match was included in the Wisden Cricketers' Almanack list of 100 best matches of the 20th century as David Bordes ran the winning leg bye with a fractured skull.

They played in the European Championship in the Netherlands in 1998, finishing eighth after losing to Germany in a play-off. They became an associate member of the ICC the same year. They finished third in Division Two of the 2000 European Championship.

France played their only ICC Trophy in the 2001 tournament in Canada, though they did not progress beyond the first round. The following year, they finished fifth in Division Two of the European Championships, and finished as runners up in the 2004 tournament. They finished sixth in the 2006 tournament after losing a play-off to Guernsey.

In 2008, France finished fourth in Division 2 of the European Championship. In 2010, France finished third in the same competition, narrowly missing out on qualification for the 2010 ICC World Cricket League Division Eight. In 2011, they finished sixth in the ICC Europe Division 1 T20 Championship after losing the fifth place play-off match to Norway. In 2012, they finished second in the ICC European World Cricket League 8 Qualifier, held in La Manga, Spain; again missing out on qualification for Division 8 of the World Cricket League.

In 2018, France competed at the ICC World Twenty20 Europe Region Qualifier in Netherlands.

In 2021, France played their first ever T20 international match against Norway in a tri-nation series in Germany, winning the match by 4 wickets.

5 August 2021
15:30
Scorecard

| Norway; 112/7 (20 overs) | v | France; 113/6 (19.3 overs) |
| Waqas Ahmed 32* (36); Dawood Ahmadzai 2/10 (4 overs) | | Suventhiran Santhirakumaran 34 (39); Raza Iqbal 2/13 (4 overs) |

France won by 4 wickets
Bayer Uerdingen Cricket Ground, Krefeld
Umpires: Jason Flannery (Ger) and Vinay Malhotra (Ger)
Player of the match: Suventhiran Santhirakumaran (Fra)

- France won the toss and elected to field.
- First ever T20I match for France.

== International grounds ==
Locations of stadiums which have hosted international cricket matches in France

| Ground | City | Region | Capacity | Matches hosted | Notes |
|---|---|---|---|---|---|
| Dreux Sport Cricket Club | Dreux | Centre-Val de Loire | 1,000 | T20Is | Hosted France's first home T20Is; used for ICC Europe qualifiers and ECS |
| Parc du Grand Cricket Ground | Nantes | Pays de la Loire | 800 | T20Is | Newer venue near Paris; hosts European Cricket Network tournaments |

== Tournament history ==
Legend

- Champions
- Runners-up
- Third place/Semi-finals
- Tournament hosted by Italy
- Q Qualified
- DNQ Did not qualify
- A Advanced to the next stage
- ▲ Promoted
- Remained in the same division
- ▼ Relegated

=== Summer Olympics ===
Cricket at the Summer Olympics records
| Host/Year | Round | Position | GP | W | L | T | NR |
|---|---|---|---|---|---|---|---|
| (France) 1900 | Runners-up | 2/2 | 1 | 0 | 1 | 0 | 0 |
| (United States) 2028 | TBD | | | | | | |
| Total | 1/1 | 0 Titles | 1 | 0 | 1 | 0 | 0 |

=== ICC Trophy/CWC Qualifier ===
ICC Trophy/Cricket World Cup Qualifier records
| Host/Year | Round | Position | GP | W | L | T | NR |
|---|---|---|---|---|---|---|---|
| (England) 1979 | Not eligible–Not an ICC member | | | | | | |
| (England) 1982 | Not eligible–Not an ICC member | | | | | | |
| (England) 1986 | Not eligible–Not an ICC member | | | | | | |
| (Netherlands) 1990 | Not eligible–ICC affiliate member | | | | | | |
| (Kenya) 1994 | Not eligible–ICC affiliate member | | | | | | |
| (Malaysia) 1997 | Not eligible–ICC affiliate member | | | | | | |
| (Namibia) 2001 | Division two | 20/24 | 5 | 1 | 4 | 0 | 0 |
| 2005–2023 | Did not qualify | | | | | | |
| Total | 1/12 | 0 Titles | 5 | 1 | 4 | 0 | 0 |

=== T20 World Cup Europe Sub-regional Qualifiers ===
T20 World Cup Europe Sub-regional Qualifiers records
| Host/Year | Round | Position | GP | W | L | T | NR |
|---|---|---|---|---|---|---|---|
| (Netherlands) 2019 | Round-robin (DNQ) | 4/6 | 5 | 2 | 3 | 0 | 0 |
| (Finland) 2023 | Round-robin (DNQ) | 4/10 | 5 | 3 | 2 | 0 | 0 |
| (Italy) 2024 | Round-robin (DNQ) | 4/10 | 5 | 3 | 2 | 0 | 0 |
| (Cyprus) 2026 | Round-robin (DNQ) | 4/10 | 5 | 3 | 2 | 0 | 0 |
| Total | 4/4 | 0 Titles | 20 | 11 | 9 | 0 | 0 |

=== European Cricket Championship ===
European Cricket Championship records
| Host/Year | Round | Position | GP | W | L | T | NR |
|---|---|---|---|---|---|---|---|
| (Denmark) 1996 | Did not participate | | | | | | |
| (Netherlands) 1998 | Round-robin | 8/10 | 5 | 2 | 3 | 0 | 0 |
| (Scotland) 2000 | Round-robin | 3/6 | 5 | 2 | 3 | 0 | 0 |
| (Republic of Ireland) 2002 | Round-robin | 5/6 | 5 | 2 | 3 | 0 | 0 |
| (Belgium) 2004 | Round-robin | 2/6 | 5 | 4 | 1 | 0 | 0 |
| (Scotland) 2006 | Round-robin | 6/8 | 3 | 1 | 2 | 0 | 0 |
| (Guernsey) 2008 | Round-robin | 5/6 | 5 | 2 | 3 | 0 | 0 |
| (Guernsey) 2010 | Round-robin | 4/6 | 5 | 3 | 2 | 0 | 0 |
| Total | 7/8 | 0 Titles | 33 | 16 | 17 | 0 | 0 |

=== European T20 Championship Division One ===
European T20 Championship Division One records
| Year | Round | Position | GP | W | L | T | NR |
|---|---|---|---|---|---|---|---|
| (Jersey) 2011 | Round-robin | 6/12 | 6 | 2 | 4 | 0 | 0 |
| (England) 2013 | Round-robin | 5/12 | 6 | 4 | 2 | 0 | 0 |
| (Jersey) 2015 | Round-robin | 6/6 | 5 | 0 | 5 | 0 | 0 |
| Total | 3/3 | 0 Titles | 17 | 6 | 11 | 0 | 0 |

=== Other tournaments ===
| Valletta Cup | Mdina Cup |
|---|---|
| (Malta) 2023: 3rd place | (Malta) 2023: Winners; (France) 2024: Runners-up |

== Records and statistics ==
International match summary — France

Last updated 30 July 2026

Playing Record
| Format | M | W | L | T | NR | Inaugural Match |
| Twenty20 Internationals | 53 | 27 | 25 | 1 | 0 | 5 August 2021 |

=== Twenty20 International ===
- Highest score: 235/2 v. Turkey on 27 July 2026 at Moara Vlasei Cricket Ground, Ilfov County.
- Highest individual score: 109, Gustav Mckeon v. Switzerland on 25 July 2022 at Tikkurila Cricket Ground, Vantaa.
- Best bowling figures in an innings: 6/21, Dawood Ahmadzai v. Malta on 9 May 2024 at Dreux Sport Cricket Club, Dreux.

T20I record versus other nations

Records complete to T20I #4054. Last updated 30 July 2026.

| Opponent | M | W | L | T | NR | First match | First win |
|---|---|---|---|---|---|---|---|
vs Associate Members
| Austria | 3 | 1 | 2 | 0 | 0 | 16 June 2024 | 28 July 2026 |
| Belgium | 4 | 1 | 2 | 1 | 0 | 10 May 2024 | 11 May 2024 |
| Croatia | 1 | 1 | 0 | 0 | 0 | 17 May 2026 | 17 May 2026 |
| Cyprus | 1 | 1 | 0 | 0 | 0 | 16 May 2026 | 16 May 2026 |
| Czech Republic | 1 | 1 | 0 | 0 | 0 | 24 July 2022 | 24 July 2022 |
| Estonia | 1 | 1 | 0 | 0 | 0 | 30 July 2022 | 30 July 2022 |
| Germany | 2 | 0 | 2 | 0 | 0 | 6 August 2021 | |
| Guernsey | 1 | 0 | 1 | 0 | 0 | 31 July 2022 | |
| Hungary | 1 | 0 | 1 | 0 | 0 | 29 June 2025 | |
| Isle of Man | 1 | 1 | 0 | 0 | 0 | 9 June 2024 | 9 June 2024 |
| Israel | 1 | 1 | 0 | 0 | 0 | 29 July 2026 | 29 July 2026 |
| Italy | 1 | 0 | 1 | 0 | 0 | 10 June 2024 | |
| Jersey | 1 | 0 | 1 | 0 | 0 | 19 May 2026 | |
| Luxembourg | 4 | 3 | 1 | 0 | 0 | 11 July 2023 | 11 July 2023 |
| Malta | 7 | 4 | 3 | 0 | 0 | 10 July 2023 | 10 July 2023 |
| Norway | 7 | 4 | 3 | 0 | 0 | 5 August 2021 | 5 August 2021 |
| Portugal | 4 | 1 | 3 | 0 | 0 | 5 April 2026 | 8 April 2026 |
| Romania | 3 | 2 | 1 | 0 | 0 | 13 July 2023 | 13 July 2023 |
| Sweden | 3 | 1 | 2 | 0 | 0 | 7 August 2025 | 10 August 2025 |
| Switzerland | 3 | 1 | 2 | 0 | 0 | 25 July 2022 | 22 May 2026 |
| Turkey | 3 | 3 | 0 | 0 | 0 | 15 June 2024 | 15 June 2024 |

== Current squad ==
Updated as of 7 August 2025.

This lists all the players who were part of the French squad for the 2025 Viking Cup.

| Name | Age | Batting style | Bowling style | Last T20I | Notes |
Batters
| Gustav McKeon | 22 | Right-handed | Right-arm medium-fast | (Hungary) 2025 | Captain |
| Mukhtar Ghulami | 27 | Right-handed | —N/a | (Sweden) 2025 | |
| Lucas Smith | 19 | Right-handed | —N/a | (Sweden) 2025 | |
| Christian Roberts | 22 | Right-handed | Leg break | (Sweden) 2025 | |
| Mustafa Omer | 26 | Right-handed | Left-arm medium-fast | (Austria) 2025 | |
| Alestin Johnmary | 33 | Right-handed | —N/a | (Sweden) 2025 | |
All-rounder
| Usman Khan | 35 | Right-handed | Right-arm medium | (Hungary) 2025 | |
| Zain Ahmad | 23 | Right-handed | Leg break googly | (Sweden) 2025 | |
| Jamshid Nasiri | 22 | Right-handed | Right-arm off break | (Sweden) 2025 | |
| Rahmatullah Mangal | 23 | Right-handed | Right-arm medium-fast | (Austria) 2025 | |
| Dawood Ahmadzai | 32 | Right-handed | Leg break | (Sweden) 2025 | |
Wicket-keeper
| Lingeswaran Canessane | 23 | Right-handed | —N/a | (Sweden) 2025 | |
| Hevit Jackson | 30 | Right-handed | —N/a | (Belgium) 2025 | |
Pace Bowlers
| Faisal Safi | 23 | Left-handed | Left-arm medium | (Norway) 2025 | |
| Noman Amjad | 22 | Right-handed | Right-arm medium-fast | (Sweden) 2025 | |
| Rohullah Mangal | 22 | Right-handed | Right-arm medium-fast | (Sweden) 2025 | |
| Zaheer Zahiri | 23 | Right-handed | Left-arm medium | (Sweden) 2025 | |

== Notable players ==
The following French national team players have played first-class or List A cricket:

- Waseem Bhatti – played first-class cricket for Pakistan International Airlines in 1998 and 1999
- Simon Hewitt – played first-class cricket for Oxford University in 1984
- David Holt – played first-class cricket for Loughborough UCCE in 2005 and 2006
- Paul Wakefield – played List A cricket for Cheshire in 1983
- Robert Mozelewski captained the French cricket team in 04/05. Qualified for the team thanks to his parents residency in France.

== See also ==
- List of France Twenty20 International cricketers
- France women's national cricket team
