= Montagu Toller =

English solicitor and cricketer (1871–1948)

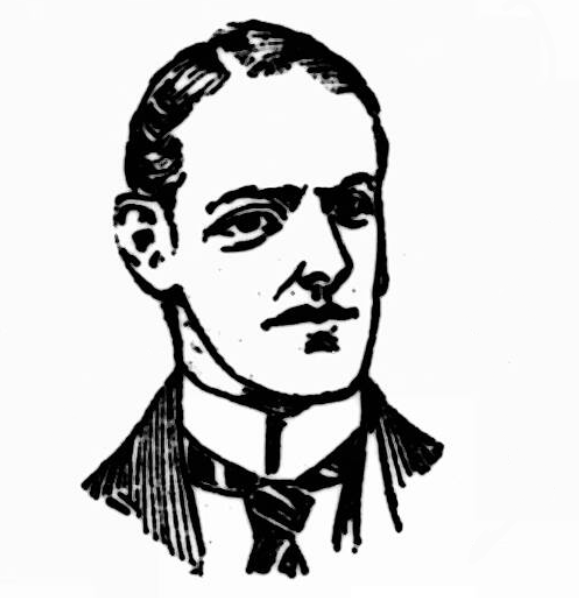
- An 1895 sketch of Toller

Personal information
- Full name: Montagu Henry Toller
- Born: 1 January 1871; Barnstaple, Devon, England
- Died: 5 August 1948 (aged 77); Meon Beach, Titchfield, Hampshire, England
- Batting: Right-handed
- Bowling: Right-arm fast

Domestic team information
- Years: Team
- 1889–1895: Devon
- 1897: Somerset
- FC debut: 17 May 1897 Somerset v Yorkshire
- Last FC: 26 July 1897 Somerset v Yorkshire

Career statistics
Competition	First-class
Matches	6
Runs scored	77
Batting average	7.70
100s/50s	0/0
Top score	17
Balls bowled	25
Wickets	1
Bowling average	15.00
5 wickets in innings	0
10 wickets in match	0
Best bowling	1/15
Catches/stumpings	1/–
Medal record
Representing United Kingdom
Men's Cricket
Gold medal – first place	1900 Paris Olympics	Two-day 12-man
- Source: CricketArchive, 22 December 2015

Montagu Henry Toller (1 January 1871 – 5 August 1948) was an English solicitor and cricketer. He played for both Devon and Somerset in the late 19th century. He made six first-class appearances for Somerset, all in 1897, but was predominantly a good club cricketer. In 1900, he was part of the Devon Wanderers team that represented Great Britain in the 1900 Summer Olympics, the only time cricket has featured in the Olympics.

== Life ==
Montagu Henry Toller was born in Barnstaple, Devon, on 1 January 1871, the son of William Henry Toller. He attended Blundell's School in Tiverton, where he played for both the cricket XI and the rugby XV. Like his father before him, he became a solicitor, but after marrying Harriet Jones in 1901, he assumed joint-management of the Royal & Fortescue Hotel in Barnstaple with his new wife. He took an active role in local politics, and was elected as an independent candidate to both the County and Town Councils. He later split from his wife, who maintained management of the hotel, while Toller moved to Brighton where he once again practiced as a solicitor. He died after a short illness in Meon Beach, Titchfield, Hampshire, on 5 August 1948, aged 77.

== Sporting career ==
Toller was described in an article about him in the Western Evening Herald as being "an adept" at both rugby and cricket, and was an all-round sportsman who also played tennis, golf and billiards to a respectable level. At cricket, Toller was a right-handed batsman and right-arm fast bowler, with a strong and sturdy physique. He was described by the Somerset cricket historian Stephen Hill as a prominent club cricketer who was a "leading light" for the Devon and Somerset Wanderers. He played second-class cricket for Devon between 1889 and 1895, during which time he was presented with many awards for his bowling and batting performances. During 1895 he was invited to play for W. G. Grace's team towards the end of the season, in which he scored 41 runs in the first innings. He had a successful trial with Somerset in 1897, in which he scored 33 runs for "Sammy Woods' XI", (Note: Sammy Woods was Somerset's captain from 1894 to 1906.) and he subsequently made six first-class appearances for the county that season as an amateur. Hill describes his usage for Somerset as strange; in club cricket Toller was best regarded for his fast bowling, and yet he only bowled once for Somerset, taking one wicket for 15 runs against Philadelphia. By the end of the 1897 season, Cricket magazine said that he had "proved an entire failure" for Somerset.

His obituary in the North Devon Journal praised his rugby prowess for Barnstaple RFC, one of the prominent clubs in the south-west at the time. He played as a three-quarter back, and was also capped at county level for Devon, for whom he first appeared in 1889. In the 1894–95 season, he achieved the rare feat of scoring three drop goals in one match for Barnstaple. He was offered the captaincy of Barnstaple more than once, but declined it on each occasion.

=== Olympics ===
Toller was a member of the gold medal-winning Great Britain cricket team at the 1900 Summer Olympics, the only time cricket has featured in the Olympics. In the only game, against France, he scored two runs in the Great Britain first innings and did not bat in the second. He took seven wickets, all of them bowled, while conceding only nine runs in the French second innings, helping Great Britain to victory with just five minutes to spare in the match.
