= John Symes (cricketer) =

English cricketer

Olympic medal record

Representing United Kingdom

Men's Cricket
Gold medal – first place	1900 Paris	Two-day 12-man

John Symes OBE (11 January 1879 – 23 September 1944) was a member of the gold medal–winning Great Britain Olympic cricket team at the 1900 Olympic Games in Paris, France.

== Personal life ==
Symes was born 11 January 1879 in Crediton, Devon. He was educated at Queen Elizabeth's School, Crediton, and Blundell's School in Tiverton. He worked as a solicitor in Crediton and eventually took over his father's practice. He was also clerk to Creditor Urban District Council for more than forty years. He served in the First World War in the 6th Battalion, Devonshire Regiment, and was awarded the OBE in 1919 for his service. He died of a heart attack while out shooting on a local farm in Crediton on 23 September 1944; he was 65.

== Cricket career ==
He was a keen cricketer and captained his local side; he also played for the Devon Dumplings. He represented the gold medal–winning Great Britain cricket team at the 1900 Summer Olympics, the only time cricket has featured in the Olympics (although it will be seen again in 2028). In the only match, against France, he scored 15 runs in Great Britain's first innings and just one run in the second.
