= Cricket at the 1900 Summer Olympics =

Men's cricket at the Games of the II Olympiad
- Venue: Vélodrome de Vincennes
- Date: 19–20 August
- Competitors: 24 from 2 nations

Medalists
1st place, gold medalist(s)		Devon and Somerset Wanderers; Great Britain
2nd place, silver medalist(s)		French Athletic Club Union; France

A cricket match was played as part of the 1900 Summer Olympics, which took place on 19–20 August at the Vélodrome de Vincennes between teams representing Great Britain and France.

Great Britain won the match by 158 runs. The French team included ten British nationals, two of whom were born in France, and two Frenchmen: as such, it is considered to be a mixed team, though it is currently listed by the IOC as representing France.

Originally, four teams entered - Belgium, France, Great Britain, and the Netherlands - and they were scheduled to compete in a knockout tournament, with the semi-finals scheduled for August 4–5 and August 11–12, and the final scheduled for August 19–20.

However, Belgium and the Netherlands both withdrew before the draw as the Netherlands were unable to field a complete cricket team, while Belgium did not send their cricket team to Paris. Therefore, the semi-finals were scratched, and Great Britain played France in a single match on the dates originally scheduled for the final.

Neither team was nationally selected: the side representing Great Britain was a touring club, the Devon and Somerset Wanderers (alias Devon County Wanderers), while the French team, the French Athletic Club Union, was composed mainly of British expatriates living in Paris.

The two-day match commenced on 19 August 1900. Great Britain batted first and scored 117, and bowled France out for 78. Great Britain declared their second innings at 145 for 5, setting the hosts a target of 185 to win: Great Britain then bowled out France for 26 to win the match by 158 runs, a significant margin, but with only five minutes remaining before stumps. The Great Britain team was awarded silver medals and the French team bronze medals, together with miniature statues of the Eiffel Tower.

While 1900 is the only Olympiad where cricket was part of the official programme, it will return at the 2028 Games in the Twenty20 format. All events which were restricted to amateurs, open to all nations, open to all competitors, and without handicapping, are now regarded as Olympic events (except for ballooning). The IOC has never decided which events were "Olympic" and which were not.

== Background ==
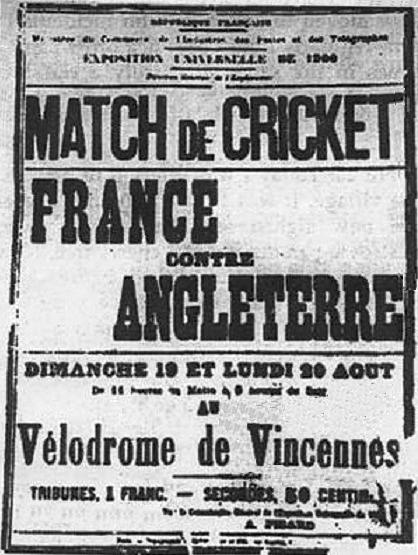
Poster of the only Olympic cricket match

Cricket had been scheduled as an event at the first modern Olympics in 1896, being listed in the original programme for the Athens Games, and would have been the only team event at the Games, but the tournament was cancelled due to a lack of entries.

Four years later, at the Paris Games, there was also a shortage of entries: Belgium and the Netherlands both withdrew before the draw. Their withdrawal left only Great Britain and the host nation, France, to participate.

The slightly haphazard nature of the cricket tournament was mirrored throughout the rest of the 1900 Olympics: events took place throughout a six-month period from May through October, and like the Games themselves, were often considered part of the Exposition Universelle, a world's fair held in Paris from 15 April until 12 November 1900.

== Team selection ==
Neither side was nationally selected, nor representative. Great Britain, or England as they were called in the advertising handbills, were represented by a touring club side, the Devon and Somerset Wanderers. The side, formed by William Donne in 1894 for a tour of the Isle of Wight, had completed five other tours before travelling to France.

The Wanderers were primarily formed from players of Castle Cary Cricket Club, five of whom played in the match, and also included four former pupils of Blundell's School, a public school in Devon. The side was completed by a number of players from the surrounding areas who were able to get away from business and personal commitments for the two-week period of the tour. Writing in the Journal of Olympic History, Ian Buchanan describes that both sides "were made up of distinctly average club cricketers". Only two members of the Wanderers side, and none of the French side, played first-class cricket. Montagu Toller played six times for Somerset County Cricket Club, all in 1897, while Alfred Bowerman played for Somerset once in 1900, and again in 1905.

The French side was officially drawn from all the member clubs of the Union des Sociétés Françaises de Sports Athlétiques. As few of these clubs actually sported cricket teams, and so the eventual side was selected from just two clubs: the Union Club and the Standard Athletic Club. Both sides had strong English influences, and the majority of the team that competed for France in the Olympic match were British expatriates; the Standard Athletic Club had been formed ten years earlier by English workers who had moved to the country to help build the Eiffel Tower.

== Match ==
=== Summary ===
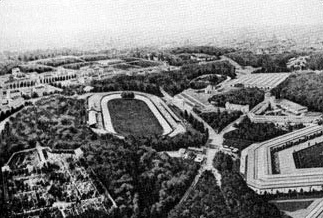
The venue of the match, Vélodrome de Vincennes, at the 1900 Summer Olympics.

The match had been intended to be a standard eleven-a-side contest, but by mutual agreement from the captains this was increased to twelve-a-side, a move which the scorecard printers had not expected: extra names had to be added by hand.

Play commenced at 11:00AM on Sunday, 19 August, with the touring Wanderers batting first. They were bowled out for 117, with only four members of the team reaching double figures. Frederick Cuming, one of the four Old Blundellians, top-scored for the side with 38, followed by their captain, and Exeter Cricket Club opening batsman, C. B. K. Beachcroft with 23. The French were then bowled out for 78, the bowling led by Frederick Christian who claimed seven wickets. Play closed at 5:00PM after both sides had completed their first innings, and the Wanderers had a lead of 39 runs. The Wanderers batting improved the following morning, and they added 145 runs for the second innings, declaring their innings closed with five wickets down. Beachcroft was again successful, reaching a half-century, a feat also achieved by Bowerman, who top-scored with 59 runs.

The French required 185 runs to win, but lost their first ten wickets for eleven runs. At this point they attempted to play out time, which would have meant the match was drawn. The match was just five minutes from the end when their eleventh, and final, wicket fell, granting the Wanderers a 158-run victory.

Toller was the pick of the Wanderers bowlers in the second innings, claiming seven wickets and conceding nine runs.

After the match, the English side were awarded silver medals, and the French side were given bronze medals, and both teams were also given miniature statues of the Eiffel Tower. The match was not covered in any national newspapers in England or France, although some of the local Devon and West Country newspapers did publish reports.

=== Scorecard ===
Great Britain	First innings		Second innings	
Batsman	Method of dismissal	Runs	Method of dismissal	Runs
C. B. K. Beachcroft	b Attrill	23	run out	54
Arthur Birkett	b Anderson	1		
John Symes	c Anderson b Robinson	15	c Attrill b Roques	1
Frederick Cuming	c Browning b MacEvoy	38	c Attrill b MacEvoy	18
Montagu Toller	b MacEvoy	2		
Alfred Bowerman	b Anderson	7	b Roques	59
Alfred Powlesland	c Browning b Robinson	10	b Roques	4
William Donne	run out	6		
Frederick Christian	b Anderson	0		
George Buckley	b Attrill	2		
Francis Burchell	not out	0		
Harry Corner	lbw Anderson	4	not out	5
Extras		9		4
Totals		117		145-5d

France	First innings				Second innings			
Bowler	Overs	Maidens	Runs	Wickets	Overs	Maidens	Runs	Wickets
William Attrill	?	?	?	2	–	–	–	–
William Anderson	?	?	?	4	–	–	–	–
Arthur MacEvoy	?	?	?	2	?	?	?	1
Douglas Robinson	?	?	?	2	–	–	–	–
H. F. Roques	–	–	–	–	?	?	?	3

France	First innings		Second innings	
Batsman	Method of dismissal	Runs	Method of dismissal	Runs
Timothée Jordan	c Corner b Christian	11	b Toller	0
Arthur Schneidau	b Christian	8	b Powlesland	1
Robert Horne	c Buckley b Christian	15	b Powlesland	1
Henry Terry	c Cuming b Powlesland	2	b Toller	1
H. F. Roques	b Powlesland	0	b Toller	0
William Anderson	b Christian	0	b Toller	8
Douglas Robinson	b Christian	0	b Powlesland	0
William Attrill	lbw Christian	0	b Toller	0
W. Browning	b Christian	0	b Toller	0
Arthur MacEvoy	b Bowerman	1	c Christian b Corner	0
Philip Tomalin	not out	3	not out	6
John Braid	run out	25	b Toller	7
Extras		11		2
Totals		78^{[a]}		26

Great Britain	First innings				Second innings			
Bowler	Overs	Maidens	Runs	Wickets	Overs	Maidens	Runs	Wickets
Frederick Christian	?	?	?	7	–	–	–	–
Alfred Powlesland	?	?	?	2	?	?	15	3
Alfred Bowerman	?	?	?	1	–	–	–	–
Montagu Toller	–	–	–	–	?	?	9	7
Harry Corner	–	–	–	–	?	?	?	1

Scorecard notes

a. The published total in the French Athletic Club Union's first innings is two more than the totals of the batsmen's runs and the extras.
b. Bowling details for overs, maidens and runs conceded are unavailable with the exception of runs conceded in the French Athletic Club Union's second innings, where some information has been recorded.

== Aftermath ==
The Devon and Somerset Wanderers played two further matches during their tour of France, both one-day contests, and won them both. They were not impressed by the French, whom a journalist at the time described as "too excitable to enjoy the game".

Neither of the teams realised that they had competed in the Olympic Games, as the match had been advertised as part of the world's fair. Although the IOC has never decided which events were "Olympic" and which were not, the medals won by the teams were later upgraded to gold for Great Britain and silver for France.

A cricket competition was scheduled for the 1904 Summer Olympics, held in St. Louis, but it was cancelled at short notice due to a lack of entries: the sport would not be included in the Olympic Games again until 2028.

As the match was 12-a-side and was scheduled for only two days, it does not have first-class status; despite this, it was the only international cricket match played that year.

== Medalists ==
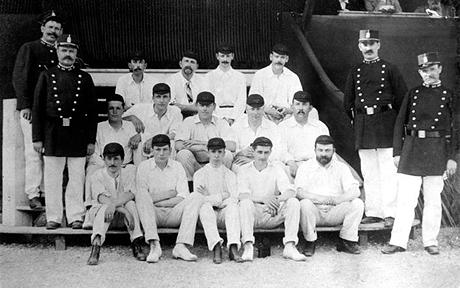
Players of Devon and Somerset Wanderers club that represented Great Britain, gold medal winners

Event	Gold	Silver
Cricket	Devon and Somerset Wanderers; Great Britain C. B. K. Beachcroft (captain) (GBR); Birkett (GBR); Alfred Bowerman (GBR); George Buckley (GBR); Francis Burchell (GBR); Frederick Christian (GBR); Harry Corner (GBR); Frederick Cuming (GBR); William Donne (GBR); Alfred Powlesland (GBR); John Symes (GBR); Montagu Toller (GBR)	French Athletic Club Union; France William Anderson (GBR); William Attrill (FRA); John Braid (GBR); W. Browning (GBR); Robert Horne (GBR); Timothée Jordan (GBR); Arthur MacEvoy (GBR); Douglas Robinson (GBR); H. F. Roques (FRA); Alfred Schneidau (GBR); Henry Terry (GBR); Philip Tomalin (captain) (FRA)
Reference: Australian Broadcasting Corporation

== See also ==
- List of Olympic venues in discontinued events

== Notes and references ==
References

- "Final: France v Great Britain at Vincennes, Aug 19–20, 1900". Cricinfo.
- "France v Great Britain in 1900". CricketArchive.
