= Vélodrome de Vincennes =

Stadium in Vincennes, France

Coordinates: 48°49′34.79″N 2°24′41.50″E

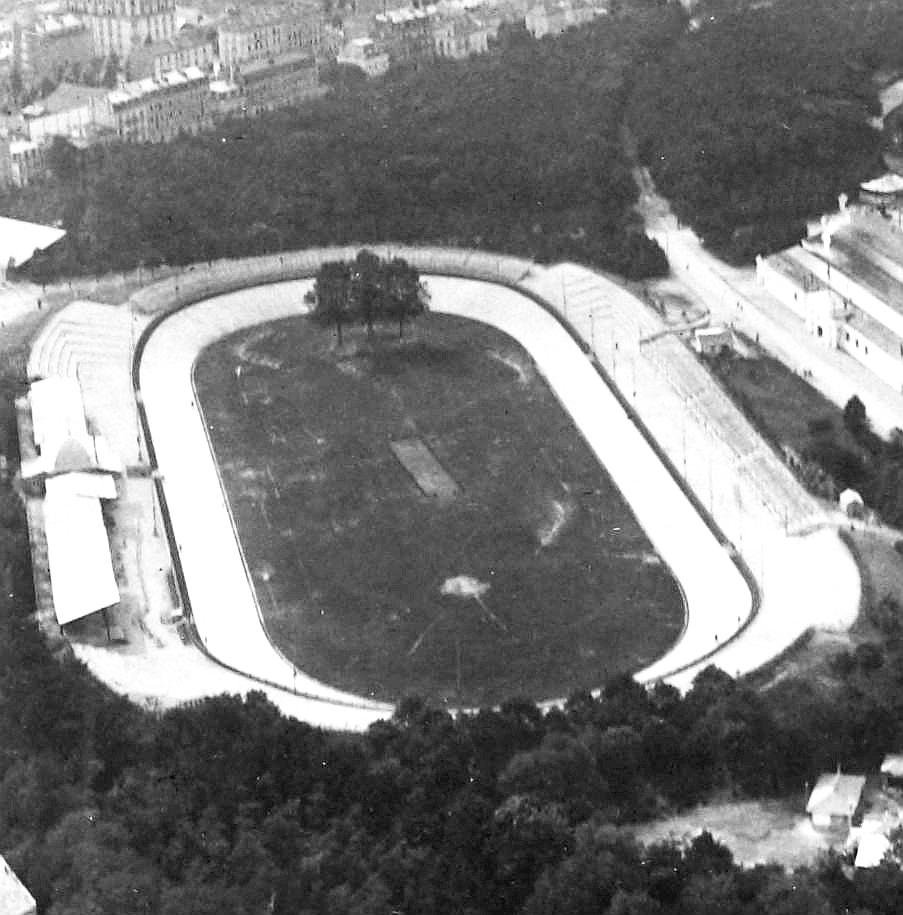
View of the velodrome as it looked around the turn-of-the-century (1900)

The Vélodrome de Vincennes (officially Vélodrome Jacques Anquetil – La Cipale) is a cycling stadium in the Bois de Vincennes, Paris, France.

== History ==
Initially built as a velodrome in 1894, it became the main stadium for the 1900 Summer Olympics; Events that took place in the Velodrome at the 1900 Summer Olympics included cycling, cricket, rugby union, football and gymnastics. However, the track and field events were held at the Racing Club de France.

At the 1924 Summer Olympics it became the cycling venue.

The venue was the finish line of the Tour de France between 1968 and 1974. Eddy Merckx won each of his five Tour victories there. Prior to 1968, the finish had been held at the Parc des Princes from 1904 to 1967. From 1975 to the present, the Tour de France has ended on the Champs-Élysées except in 2024 when, due to preparations for the Summer Olympics, the tour finished with a time trial from Monaco to Nice.

It has featured in two 2010 feature films, La Rafle and Sarah's Key, standing in for the Vélodrome d'hiver, in films about the notorious round-up of Parisian Jews in July 1942.

The stadium is still used for cycling, football and rugby matches.

In 2013, the ground hosted three cricket matches when Marylebone Cricket Club visited France.

Vélodrome Jacques-Anquetil

== See also ==
- List of cycling tracks and velodromes

== Sources ==
- lords.org
