= Margaret Abbott =

American golfer (1878–1955)

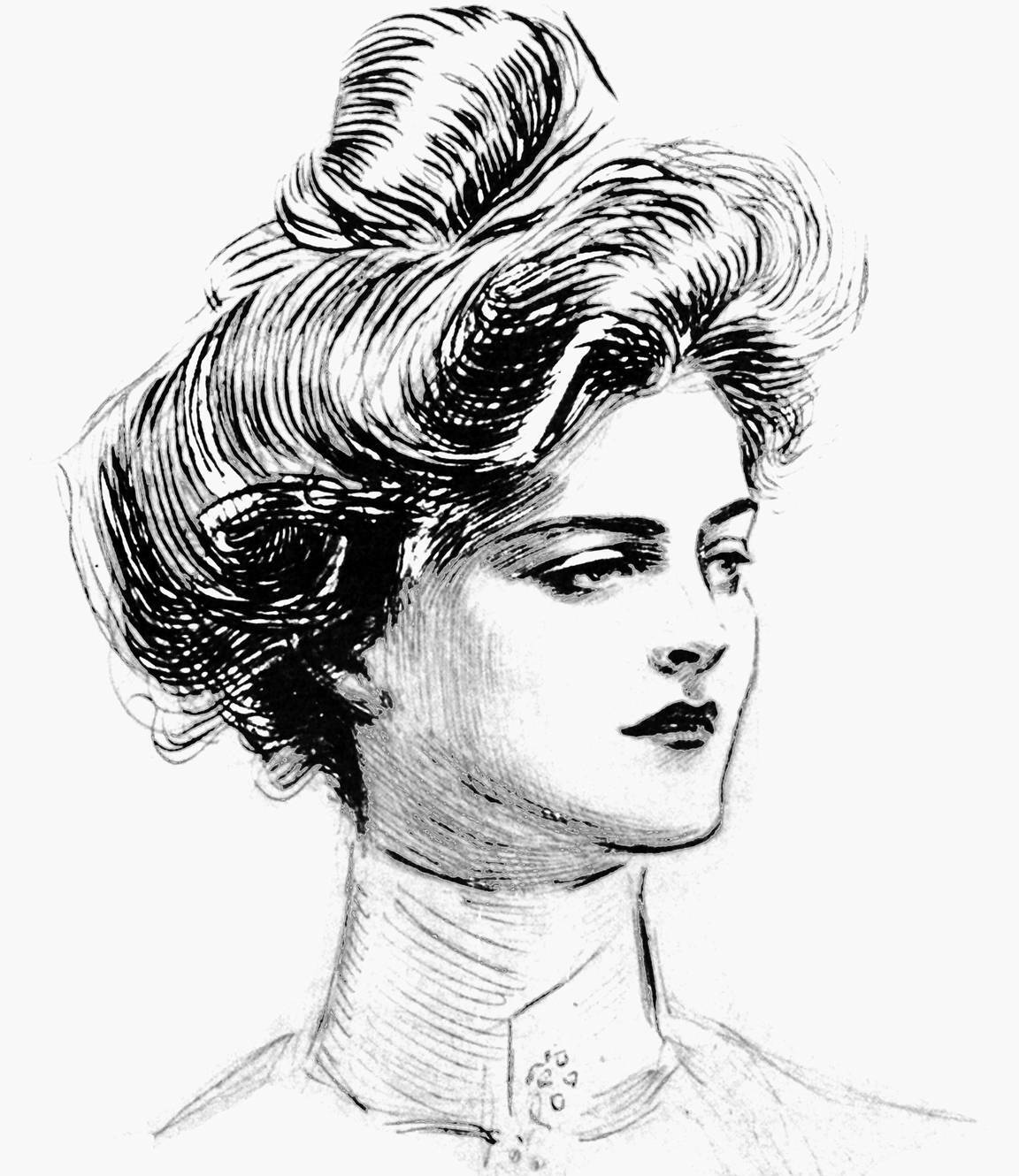
- Portrait c. 1903

Personal information
- Full name: Margaret Ives Abbott
- Nationality: United States
- Born: June 15, 1878 Calcutta, British Raj
- Died: June 10, 1955 (aged 76) Greenwich, Connecticut, U.S.
- Height: 5 ft 11 in (180 cm)
- Spouse: Finley Peter Dunne (m. 1902; died 1936)
- Children: 4, including Philip

Career
- Sport: Golf
- Status: Amateur
Medal record
Women's golf
Representing United States
Olympic Games
Gold medal – first place	1900 Paris	Individual

Margaret Ives Abbott (June 15, 1878 – June 10, 1955) was an American amateur golfer. She was the first American woman to win an Olympic event: the women's golf tournament at the 1900 Summer Olympics.

Born in Calcutta (now Kolkata), British Raj, in 1878, Abbott moved with her family to Chicago in 1884. She joined the Chicago Golf Club in Wheaton, Illinois, where she received coaching from Charles B. Macdonald and H. J. Whigham. In 1899, she traveled with her mother to Paris to study art. The following year, along with her mother, she signed up for a women's golf tournament without realizing that it was the second modern Olympics. Abbott won the tournament with a score of 47 strokes; her mother tied for seventh place. Abbott received a porcelain bowl as a prize.

In December 1902, she married the writer Finley Peter Dunne. They later moved to New York and had four children. Abbott died at the age of 76 in 1955, never realizing that she won an Olympic event. She was not well known until Paula Welch, a professor at the University of Florida, researched her life. In 2018, The New York Times published her belated obituary.

== Life and career ==
=== Early life ===
Margaret Ives Abbott was born on June 15, 1878, in Calcutta (now Kolkata), British Raj, to Charles and Mary Ives Abbott. Her father was a wealthy American merchant who died in 1879. Margaret, along with her mother and her siblings, moved to Boston. During her teenage years, her mother became literary editor of the Chicago Herald and the family moved to Chicago in 1884.

In the late nineteenth century, women were restricted from competing in various sports. Golf clubs allowed women to play only if they were accompanied by a man. Abbott, along with her mother, began playing golf at the Chicago Golf Club in Wheaton, a suburb of Chicago. She was coached by amateur golfers Charles B. Macdonald and H. J. Whigham. Abbott and Macdonald partnered in an 1897 tournament at Washington Park. She won several local tournaments, and by 1899, she had a two handicap. She was referred to as a "fierce competitor", and was known to have a "classy backswing". That same year, she and her mother traveled to Paris. Her mother researched and wrote a travel guide A Woman's Paris: A Handbook of Every-day Living in the French Capital (1900); Margaret studied art alongside Auguste Rodin and Edgar Degas.

=== Paris Olympics ===
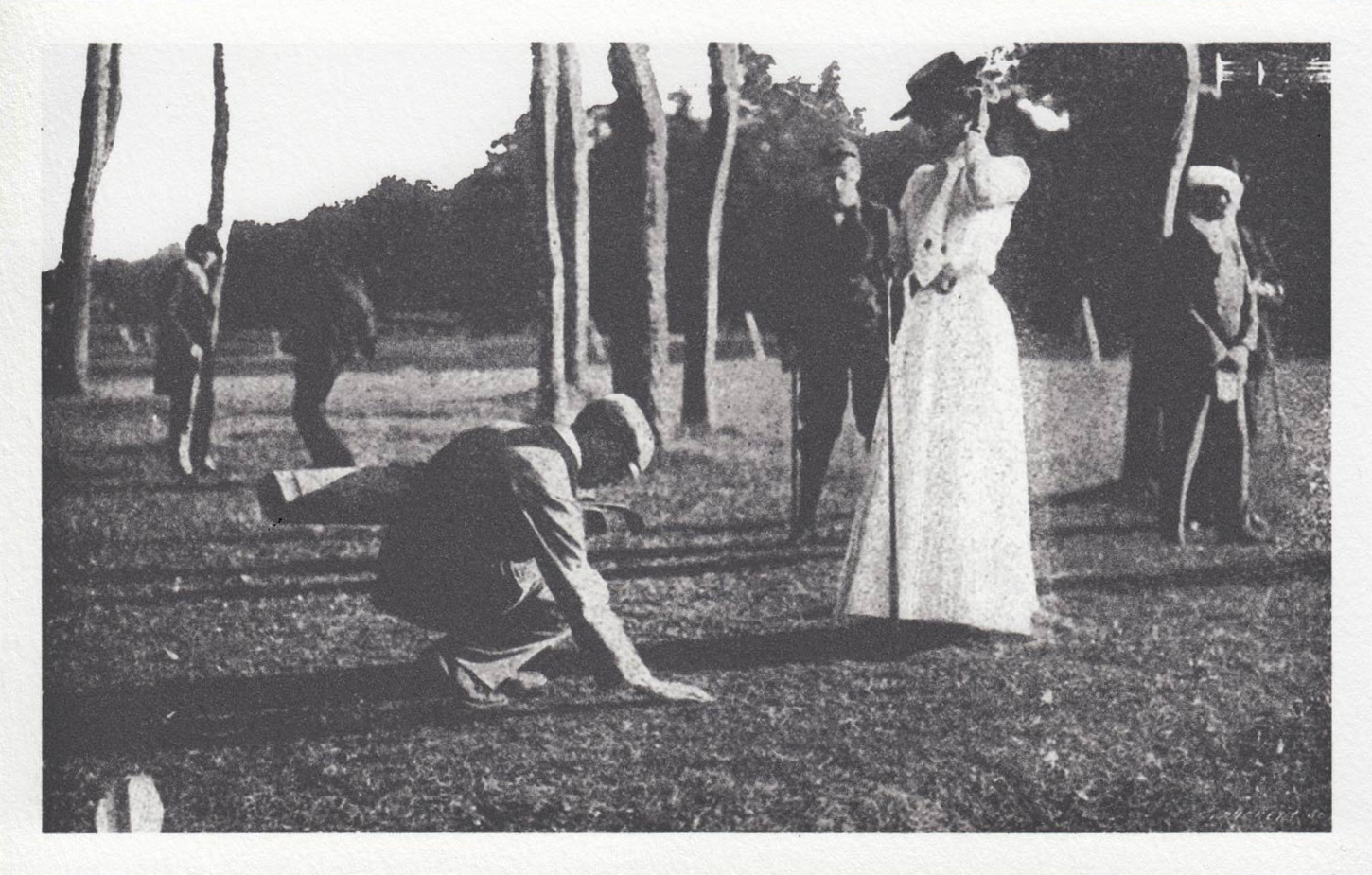
Margaret Abbott plays in the 1900 Olympic Games women's golf event in Compiegne, France.

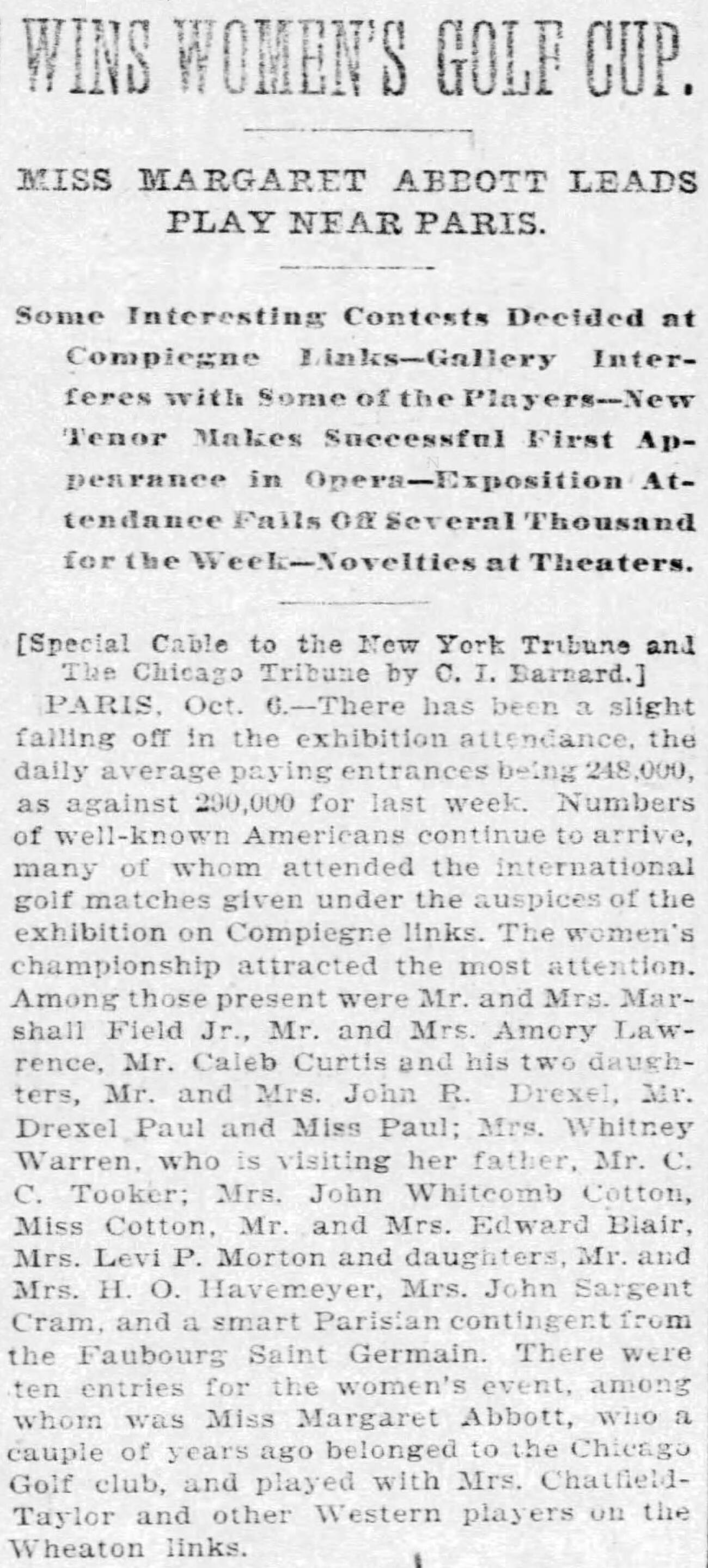
Article on Abbott's victory in the Chicago Tribune, October 7, 1900

The 1900 Summer Olympics, hosted in Paris between May and October, was the second modern Olympics. Pierre de Coubertin, the founder of the Olympics, initially planned the games for men only. In 1900, however, women were allowed to compete for the first time in five sports: golf, tennis, sailing, rowing and equestrianism. Out of a total of 997 athletes, 22 were women. The events lacked proper equipment, did not have an opening or closing ceremony, and included sports like tug of war, kite flying, hot air ballooning, and pigeon racing. Two golf events were scheduled—one for men and one for women. The women's event was held over 9 holes ranging in distance from 59 meters (65 yards) to 195 meters (213 yards) from the ladies' tees; the men's was a 36-hole event. Titled "Prix de la ville de Compiègne", the women's event took place on October 3 in Compiègne, about 30 miles (48 km) north of Paris.

The Olympics coincided with the 1900 Paris Exposition, and many believed that it was overshadowed by the latter. Golf Illustrated referred to the event as the competition "in connection with the Paris Exhibition". The golf tournament was billed as the "Exposition Competition" or "Paris World's Fair Competition" instead of being referred to as an Olympic event. Olympics historian Bill Mallon later said: "A lot of the events in 1900 were considered demonstration sports. It's very hard to tell what was an Olympics sport and what was not." According to Mallon, many athletes did not know that they were participating in the Olympics.

Abbott learned about the tournament from a newspaper notice. Taking a break from her studies, she decided to sign up for the event. She won with a score of 47 strokes. Pauline Whittier was the runner-up, with 49 strokes, while Abbie Pratt finished 3rd with 53 strokes. Mary Abbott also participated in the event and tied for seventh place with a score of 65. All ten competitors played in long skirts and hats. According to Philip Dunne, his mother would later tell her family she won the tournament "because all the French girls apparently misunderstood the nature of the game scheduled that day and turned up to play in high heels and tight skirts".

For her victory Abbott was awarded an old Saxon porcelain bowl mounted in chiseled gold. The winners of some events at the Paris games were awarded rectangular gold, silver, and bronze medals designed by French sculptor Frédéric Vernon. No medals were awarded for many other events, including golf, with prizes instead being cups, bowls, and other similar trophies. Abbott's victory was reported in the Chicago Tribune.

=== Later life ===
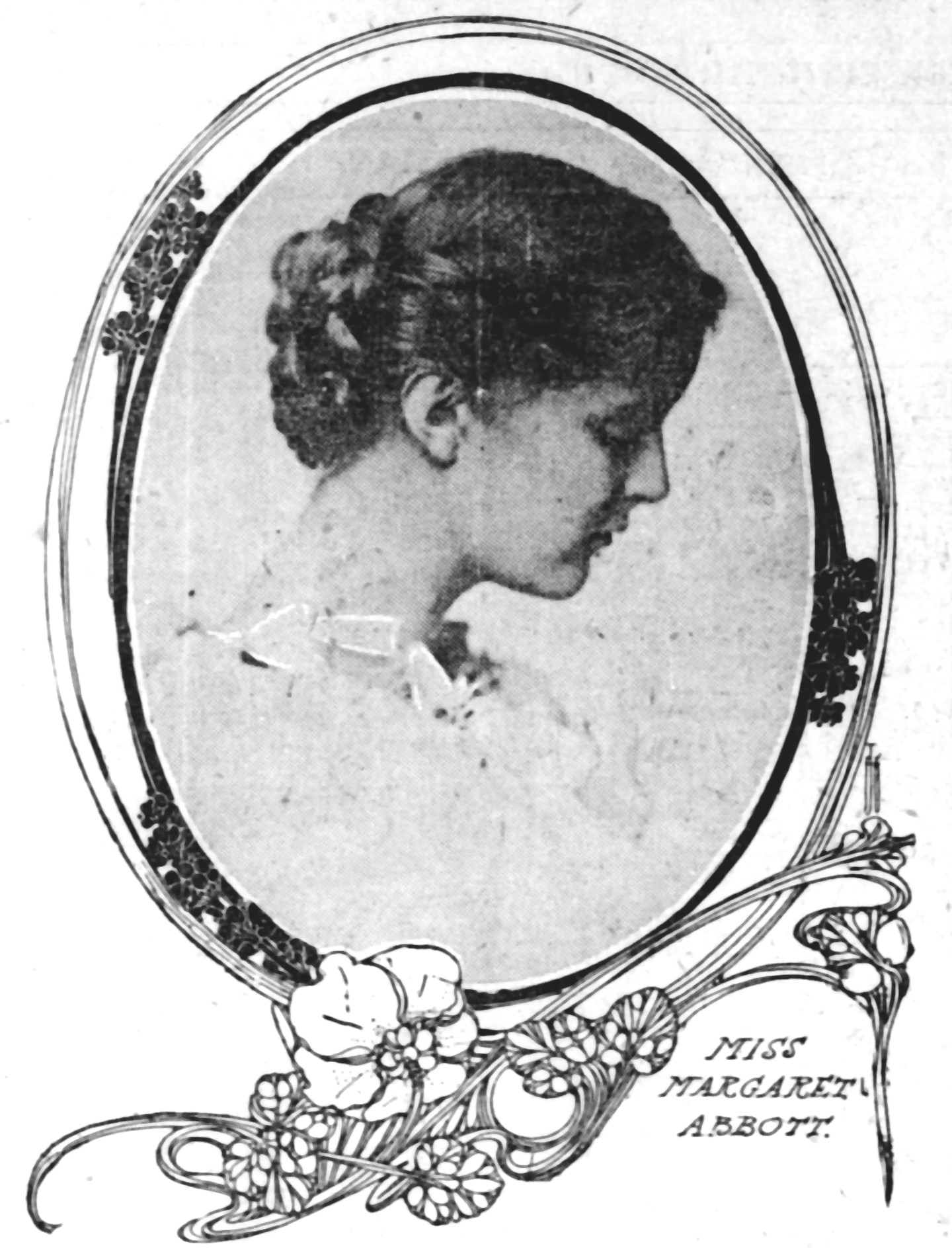
Abbott in the Chicago Tribune, November 28, 1902

Abbott stayed in Paris and won a French championship before returning to America in 1901. She married the writer Finley Peter Dunne on December 9, 1902. According to the Chicago Tribune, although the wedding ceremony "was celebrated as quietly and with as little display as possible", they received telegrams from "dozens of [...] literary lights", including Sir Arthur Conan Doyle. The couple later settled in New York City. They had four children, including Philip Dunne. Abbott did not compete in many tournaments due to a knee injury caused by a childhood accident. Records of Abbott's ties to the Chicago Golf Club were destroyed in the 1912 clubhouse fire. Abbott died at the age of 76 on June 10, 1955, in Greenwich, Connecticut, five days before she would have turned 77.

== Legacy ==
Abbott never realized that she participated in and became the first American woman to win an Olympic event. She was not well known until Paula Welch, a professor at the University of Florida and a member of the Olympics Board of Directors, researched her life during the 1970s when she first saw Abbott mentioned as an Olympic champion in 1973. Welch spent a decade examining newspaper articles that mentioned Abbott's successes in various golfing competitions. In the mid-1980s, she contacted Philip, Abbott's son, informing him about his mother's Olympic victory. Analyzing the reasons for her obscurity, Welch said: "We didn't have the coverage that we have today [...] She came back. She got married. She raised her family. She played some golf, but she didn't really pursue it in tournaments."

Writing for Golf Digest in 1984, Philip wrote: "It's not every day that you learn your mother was an Olympic champion, 80-odd years after the fact. The champion herself had told us only that she had won the golf championship of Paris." In 1996, Abbott was the featured athlete of the 1900 Olympics in the official Olympics program of the Atlanta games. After 1904, golf was not included in the Olympic Games until the 2016 Summer Olympics. In 2018, The New York Times published her belated obituary.

== Works cited ==
=== Online sources ===
- "Margaret Abbott: A Study Break". Encyclopædia Britannica. January 19, 2006.
- Fox, Margalit (March 8, 2018). "Margaret Abbott: The First American Woman to Win an Olympic Championship". The New York Times.
- Holmes, Tao Tao (August 10, 2016). "The First American Woman to Win an Olympic Championship Didn't Even Know It". Atlas Obscura. OCLC 960889351.
- Lieberman, Stuart (March 21, 2016). "Margaret Abbott Aced Team USA's First Women's Olympic Gold Medal and Didn't Know It". United States Olympic & Paralympic Committee. Archived from the original on March 24, 2016.
- "Margaret Ives Abbott". Olympic Games.
- "Margaret Abbott, the Olympic Golf Champion Who Died Without Knowing It". Olympic Games. October 5, 2021.
- "Olympic Games Paris 1900 — Medal Design". International Olympic Committee.
- Rumore, Kori (August 4, 2021). "Chicago Golfer Margaret Abbott was the 1st American Woman to Win a Gold Medal at the Olympics – But She Never Knew it. Here's Why". Chicago Tribune.
- Taylor, Katie (2021). "Margaret Ives Abbott". National Women's History Museum. Archived from the original on June 23, 2022.
- "An Unknowing Historymaker: Margaret Abbott was the First American Female to be an Olympic Champion". United States Olympic & Paralympic Museum. March 7, 2020.
- "Recognizing First U.S. Women's Champion Is A Step In The Right Direction". University of Florida. July 9, 1996.

=== Print sources ===
- Abbott, Mary (1900). A Woman's Paris: A Handbook of Every-day Living in the French Capital. Small, Maynard & Company – via the Internet Archive.
- Barnard, C. I. (October 6, 1900). "Wins Women's Golf Cup. — Miss Margaret Abbott Leads Play Near Paris". Chicago Tribune. Chicago. p. 9 – via Newspapers.com.
- "Playing Dress-Up Hurt Athletes in 1900". Los Angeles Times. July 25, 1984 – via Newspapers.com.
- Costa, D. Margaret; Guthrie, Sharon Ruth, eds. (1994). Women and Sport: Interdisciplinary Perspectives. Human Kinetics. ISBN 978-0-87322-686-8 – via the Internet Archive.
- Ellis, Elmer (1969) [1941]. Mr. Dooley's America: A Life of Finley Peter Dunne. Archon Books. ISBN 978-0-208-00734-6 – via the Internet Archive.
- Emery, Lynne (1984). "Women's Participation in the Olympic Games: A Historical Perspective". Journal of Physical Education, Recreation & Dance. 55 (5): 62–72. doi:10.1080/07303084.1984.10629768.
- Fuller, Linda K. (2018). Female Olympian and Paralympian Events: Analyses, Backgrounds, and Timelines. Springer Publishing. ISBN 978-3-319-76792-5 – via Google Books.
- Mallon, Bill (1998). The 1900 Olympic Games: Results for All Competitors in All Events, with Commentary. McFarland & Company. ISBN 978-0-7864-8952-7 – via Internet Archive.
- Mallon, Bill; Jerris, Randon (2011). Historical Dictionary of Golf. Scarecrow Press. ISBN 978-0-8108-7465-7 – via Google Books.
- "International Tournament at Compiègne". Golf Illustrated. Vol. 6, no. 70. London. October 12, 1900. pp. 28–29 – via Google Books.
- Warner, Patricia Campbell (2006). "Part One: The Influence of Fashion. Chapter 5, Women Enter the Olympics: A Sleeker Swimsuit". When the Girls Came Out to Play: The Birth of American Sportswear. University of Massachusetts Press. ISBN 978-1-55849-548-7.
- Welch, Paula (1982). "Search for Margaret Abbott" (PDF). Olympic Review. 182: 752–754. Archived from the original (PDF) on September 12, 2016.
