= Golf at the 1900 Summer Olympics – Women's individual =

Golf at the Olympics

Women's individual golf at the Games of the II Olympiad
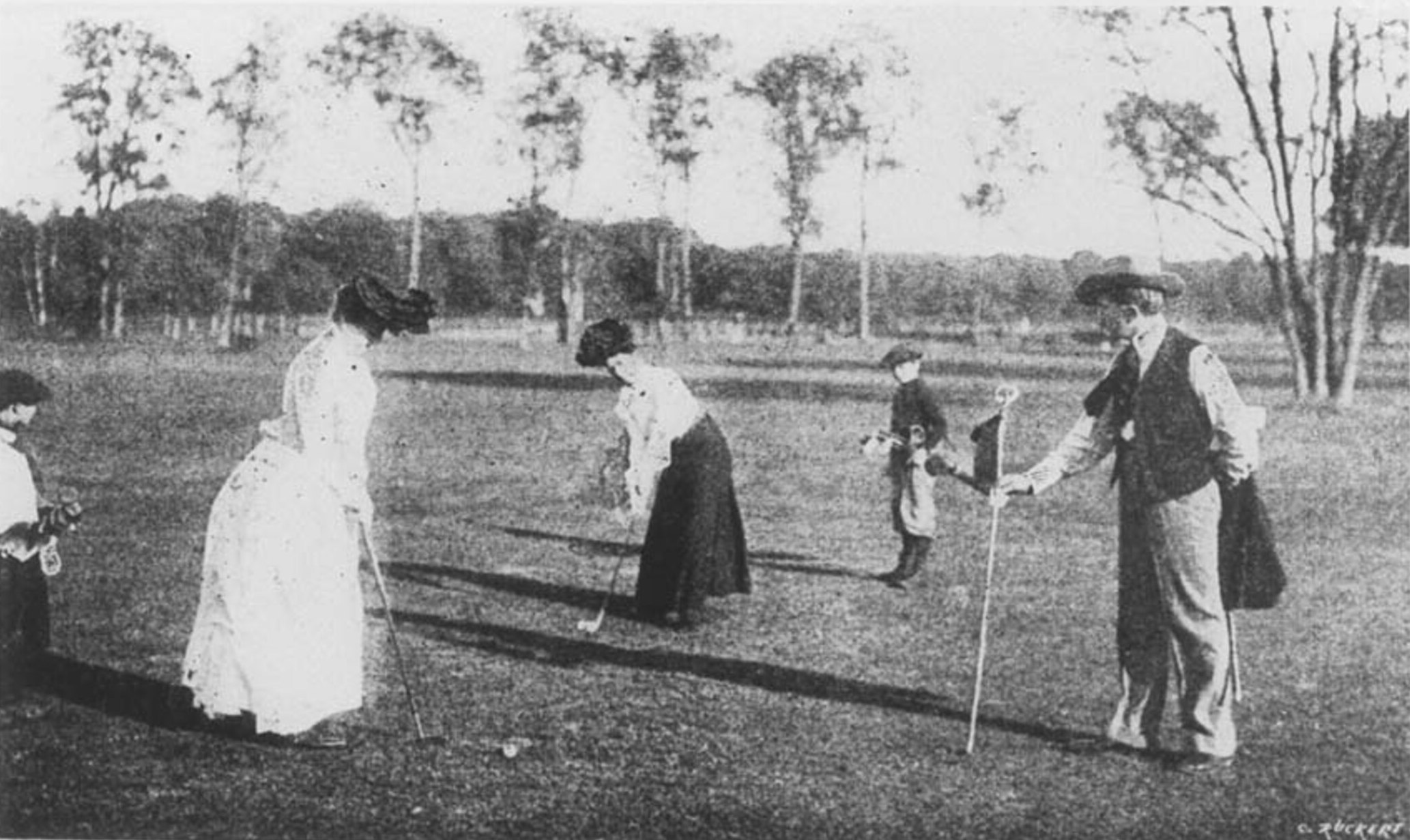
- Women's golf at the 1900 Summer Olympics
- Venue: Compiègne Golf Club
- Date: 3 October 1900
- Competitors: 10 from 2 nations

Medalists
1st place, gold medalist(s)		Margaret Abbott; United States
2nd place, silver medalist(s)		Pauline Whittier; Switzerland
3rd place, bronze medalist(s)		Abbie Pratt; France

A women's golf tournament was played at the 1900 Summer Olympics. It was the only time women's golf was featured at the Olympics until 2016. There were 10 competitors from 2 nations (France and the United States) at the event, which was played on 3 October at the Compiègne Club. The event was won by Margaret Abbott of the United States, the first American woman Olympic champion (though she did not realize it, unaware that the golf tournament was part of the Olympics). Despite being Americans, Whittier and Pratt are considered by the IOC to have represented Switzerland and France, respectively. Abbott was in Paris accompanying her mother and studying art. Whittier was an American studying in St. Moritz. Pratt was an American who spent significant time in Europe and competed under the auspices of the (French) Dinard Golf Club.

Abbott later told her family that she won the tournament:

because all the French girls apparently misunderstood the nature of the game scheduled that day and turned up to play in high heels and tight skirts".

Abbott's mother, Mary Abbott also competed in the event; it is the only time that a mother and daughter have competed in the same Olympic event at the same Games.

== Background ==
In the preparation for the 1900 Games, a Special Advisory Committee led by Jacques de Pourtalès (a cousin of Hermann de Pourtalès, who along with his wife Hélène de Pourtalès won a gold medal in sailing in 1900) proposed a golf tournament be included given that the sport was popular in many countries (though not well known in France). The result was the first Olympic golf tournament, held at the Compiègne golf club. Divisions for both men and women, as well as a men's handicap division (not considered Olympic) were set.

Golf would be held again in 1904, with individual and team men's events that year. In 1908, which would have again been a men-only event, a dispute among the host nation's golfers resulted in all of the British competitors boycotting, leaving only a single competitor – George Lyon of Canada – and resulting in the cancellation of the event.

Women’s golf returned to the Olympics in 2016, at the Rio Games.

== Competition format ==
The women's event consisted of a 9-hole stroke play tournament. The scores for each of the 9 holes were summed to give a total for each player, with the lowest score winning. In the event of a tie, a replayed hole would be used.

== Schedule ==
Date	Time	Round
Wednesday, 3 October 1900		Final

== Results ==
The women played half a round (9 holes) on 3 October.

Result of the women's golf event
Rank	Player	Nation	Score
1st place, gold medalist(s)	Margaret Abbott	United States	47
2nd place, silver medalist(s)	Pauline Whittier (USA)	Switzerland	49
3rd place, bronze medalist(s)	Abbie Pratt (USA)	France	53
4	Jeanne Froment-Meurice	France	56
5	Ellen Ridgway	United States	57
6	Madeleine Fournier-Sarlovèze	France	58
7	Mary Abbott	United States	65
7	Baroness Lucile de Fain	France	65
9	Rose Gelbert	France	76
10	Marie Brun	France	80

== Sources ==
- International Olympic Committee medal winners database
- De Wael, Herman. "Golf 1900". Full Olympians. Archived from the original on 28 February 2021.
- Mallon, Bill (1998). The 1900 Olympic Games, Results for All Competitors in All Events, with Commentary. Jefferson, North Carolina: McFarland & Company, Inc., Publishers. ISBN 0-7864-0378-0.
