= Angling at the 1900 Summer Olympics =

Angling at the Games of the II Olympiad
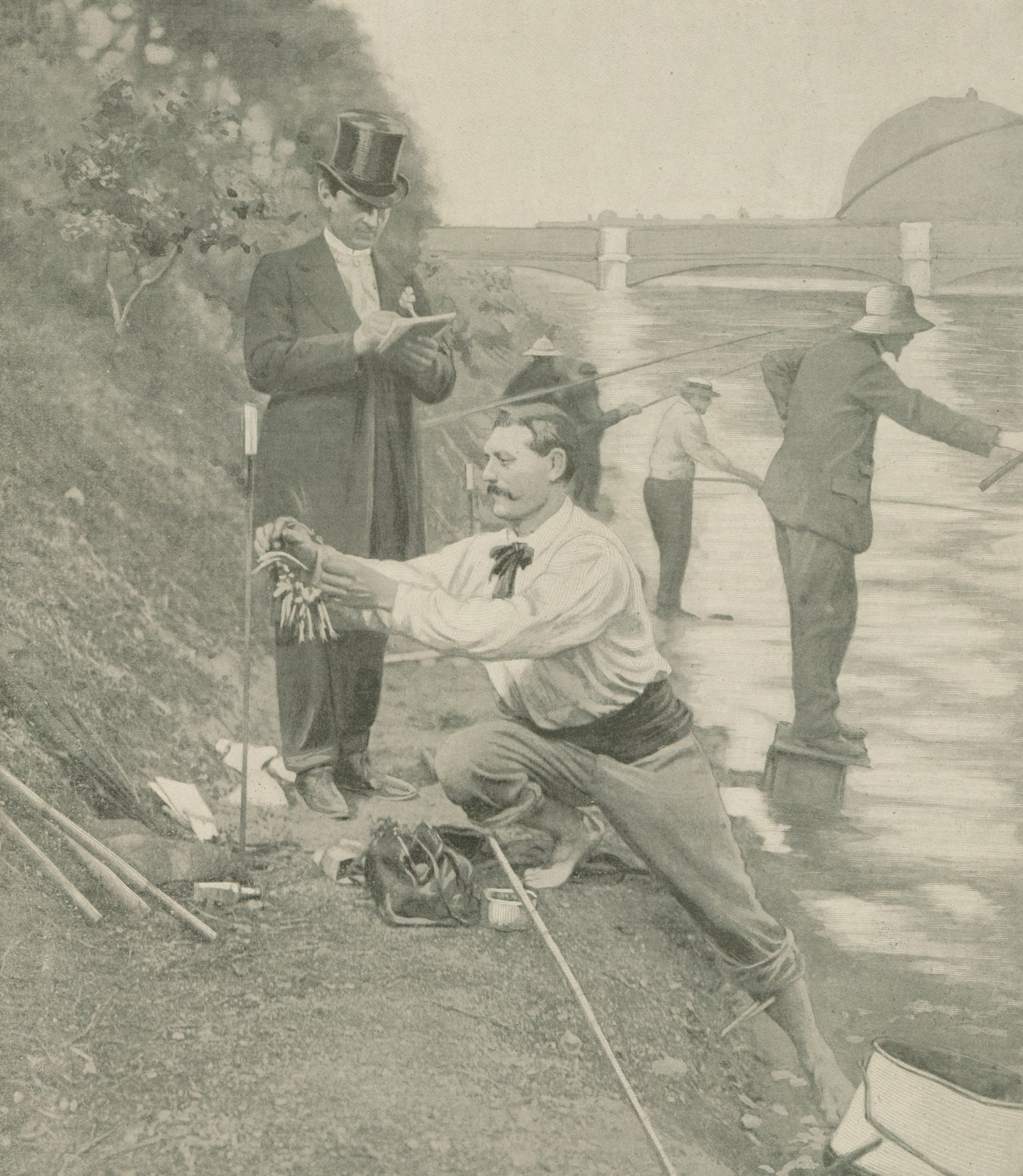
- Angling at the 1900 Summer Olympics in La Vie au grand air. A Jury member, wearing a top hat, is noting in his notebook the catch of a contestant. August 19, 1900.
- Venue: Île aux Cygnes, Paris, France
- Dates: August 5, 1900; August 8, 1900
- No. of events: 7
- Competitors: 600 (560 French and 40 foreigners) from 6 nations

Medalists
1st place, gold medalist(s)		M. Goethiers	France
2nd place, silver medalist(s)		Hyacinthe Lalanne	France
3rd place, bronze medalist(s)		N/A	France

Angling was contested at the 1900 Olympics in Paris. At a series of competitions in August, some 600 fishermen, of whom 40 were from five countries other than France, participated in six separate events. These events have generally not been classified as official, although the IOC has never decided which events were "Olympic" and which were not. There was no such designation at the time of the Games. The angling events, officially named Concours international de pêche à la ligne ("International Angling Competition"), were organized as part of the 1900 Universal Exhibition in Paris.

Six heats of 100 anglers took place: Sunday morning for foreigners, Sunday afternoon and two on Monday for non-Parisians, and two on Tuesday for the local fishermen. The first ten anglers of each heat, having taken the most fish, qualified for the "concours d'honneur" (final) on Wednesday.

== Context ==
The presence of angling among the events was highly debated in the Naval Sports section: originally, the organisers of the Exposition Universelle flatly refused, arguing that angling was not a proper sport.

The general committee for the organization of water sports was chaired by Admiral Victor Duperré and included senators and former ministers such as Édouard Barbey and Pierre Baudin, but above all many presidents of fishing associations.

France then had at least 330 very active fishing societies, with the support of over a million members, most of them from the working class. This argument was essential. Indeed, unlike other sports and other sports federations, fishing was considered "accessible to all classes of society and to all individuals", as written in Le Gymnaste of February 17, 1900. Guadeloupe deputy Gaston Gerville-Réache was among the main supporters of angling. Fishing would then be a way of more directly involving the working classes in the sporting competitions of the Universal Exhibition.

Another argument was economic and ecological. The competitions were seen as an encouragement to improve the health of French waterways. The fishermen and the organizers insisted that they be restocked in order to provide the poorest classes with either additional income or an improvement in their diet by providing an additional source of protein.

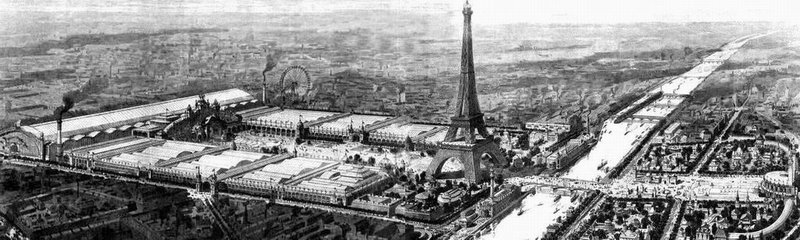
View of the 1900 Universal Exhibition in Paris.

Finally, the organisers of the Exposition Universelle relented and admitted angling to be included among the contests; however, instead of the 92000 francs of subventions asked by the Naval Sports organizing committee, only 14000 francs would be given as subventions to help to fund the angling contests.

== Events ==
=== Committee ===
The central union of presidents of companies and unions of anglers in France was responsible for organizing the competition. The organizing committee was consequently chaired by Émile Ehret, president of the Union Association of Anglers of Paris.

Its vice-presidents were:

- Ravet de Monteville (president of the Union of Anglers of Lille)
- J. B. Joulin (president of the Society of Anglers of Haute-Garonne)
- Marquess de Tanlay (representing the fishermen of Yonne)
- Bichat (president of the Society of Anglers of Meurthe-et-Moselle)
- L. Rey du Boissieu (president of the Union of Anglers of Rennes)
- Gustave Frenzer (president of the Union of anglers of Saumur)

All the other members were like them bourgeois and middle class personalities presiding over local or departmental fishing societies.

=== Jury ===
The jury of the contest has been appointed by the organizing committee of the contest. It was headed by Albert Petit (vice-president of the honorary committee of the Central Union of Anglers of France). Its vice-presidents were:

- the Dutchman C. C. A. de Wit (president of the Amsterdam Fishing Club)
- L. Mersey
- Doctor Navarre

Its members were:

- Th. Brenot
- Count Camille de Briey, a Belgian MP
- André Dejean
- Charles Deloncle
- M. d'Hénouville
- Émile Ehret
- John Labusquière
- Louis Lion
- M. Magnien.

=== Contestants ===
Of the 600 contestants, 560 were French and the 40 others came from Belgium, Germany, Italy, the Netherlands and the United Kingdom. Fishermen, who could be men or women, French or foreigners, of 18 years and above and, could enter as individual contestants or as members of fishing societies. Individual contestants were encouraged to compete in the same heats as the fishing societies of their hometowns in order to simplify the organization.

Nearly 3,000 people tried to register on Sunday, August 5. The number of registrants on Monday and Tuesday surprised the jury, because many of them were workers, who are by definition not available during the week. The entry fee was set at 3 francs, to be paid before June 15 to the president of the organizing committee. However, out of the 600 registered contestants, only 500 paid the registration fee. The president of the organizing committee covered the costs of about a hundred participants.

=== Regulations for the contest ===
Competitors were only allowed one line each, with a maximum of two hooks. While competitors were each allowed to use a landing net, they could not get help from another person. Finally, competitors were allowed to use as much groundbait as they wished.

=== Conditions of the contest ===
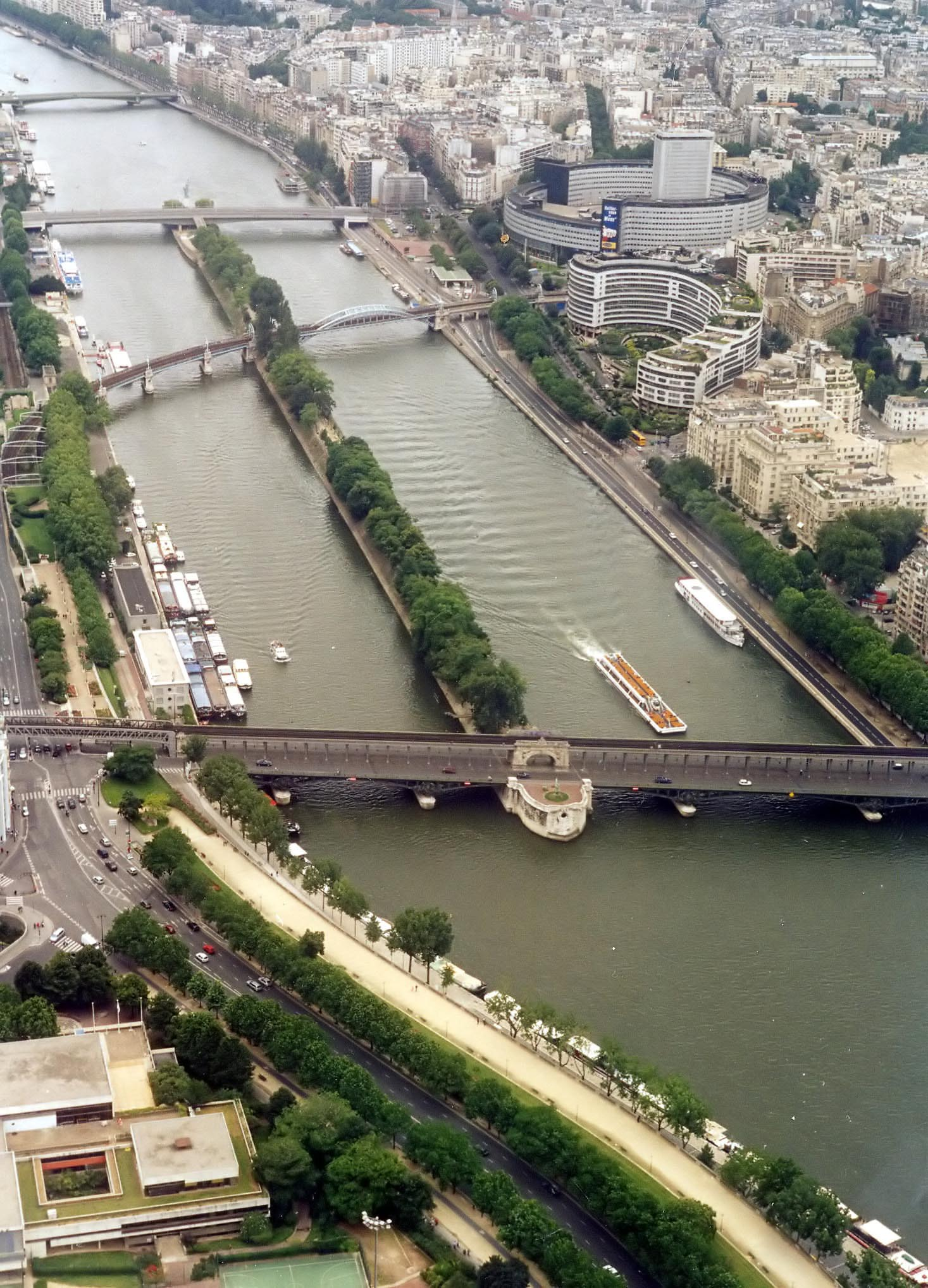
Île aux Cygnes from the top level of the Eiffel Tower.

The competitions were scheduled to take place over four days starting on Sunday, August 5, in the Seine, on its left arm created by the Île aux Cygnes, between the Pont d'Iéna and the Pont de Grenelle, at the foot of the main sites of the Universal Exhibition. From an organizational point of view, the island was suitable: it offered a long straight line putting the competitors on an equal footing and offered an excellent viewpoint to the public.

However, the choice of location did not please the organizers: the Seine was in fact "ruined" and depopulated; the fish there were very small. In addition, this left arm was poorly oxygenated in the summer and the fish avoided it. Finally, just before the start of the competition, on July 27 and 28, accidental pollution caused by a sewer at the Pont de la Concorde killed more than 30 tons of fish in the river.

The organizing committee warned in the rules that there are no salmon to be caught in the Seine and that one must instead count on roach, bleak, chub, gudgeon, bream, hotu (which the jury calls "mullet"), barbel, carp, perch and pike; more rarely monkfish, dace, tench and eel. In fact, it was mainly "small fry" that were taken out of the water by the participants in the competition.

La Pêche moderne attacked the organizers of the angling competition, joking that contestants should have brought their own fish.

=== Starting heats ===
In order not to disadvantage provincial and foreign competitors, compared to Parisian competitors who had potential knowledge of the venues, contestants were separated according to their homelands. The first series on Sunday was reserved for foreigners only, the second series on Sunday, as well as those on Monday, for contestants from the French provinces, and finally, the series on Tuesday was reserved for Parisians.

Six heats of 100 anglers each took place: Sunday morning for foreigners, Sunday afternoon and two on Monday for non-Parisians (French provincial fishermen), and two on Tuesday for the local (Parisian) fishermen.

The first ten anglers of each heat in number of taken fish qualified for the "concours d'honneur" (final) on Wednesday.

1800 francs in prizes were awarded for the six heats: in each heat, a prize of 200 was given to the contestant who caught the biggest fish and 100 was distributed among the first ten anglers with the most fish.

Heat	Time	Contestants	Number of taken fish	President
1	Sunday morning	Foreigners	17	Minister for Public Works Pierre Baudin
2	Sunday afternoon	Non-Parisians	104	Minister for Public Works Pierre Baudin
3	Monday morning	Non-Parisians	78	Minister of Justice Ernest Monis
4	Monday afternoon	Non-Parisians	66	Minister of Justice Ernest Monis
5	Tuesday morning	Parisians	264	Prefect of the Seine Justin de Selves
6	Tuesday afternoon	Parisians	641	Prefect of the Seine Justin de Selves

Heats 1, 3 and 4 had mixed success. Foreigners and provincials preferred to "fish for the big game", attracted by the main prize of 200 francs; as accidental pollution by waste released from the sewers of Paris killed most of the big fish, only nine competitors ranked after the first series.

The second series included many fishermen from Amiens, who had come to explore the area and inquire about the types of prey: it was much more successful.

During one of the non-Parisians' heats, Mrs. B, (Note: Only the first letter of her surname has been registered) member of the Fishermen Society of Amiens, finished among the first ten and thus qualified for the final on Wednesday.

=== Concours d'honneur ===
The Wednesday honor competition pitted 57 competitors against each other, including twenty Parisians. They caught a total of 881 fish, an average of sixteen fish per finalist. The first 24 shared 3,800 francs in prize money. The jury used the name of their fishing society for the final ranking.

The biggest fish was caught by Élie Lesueur from Amiens, who received the title of "world champion" and whom the Président de la République Émile Loubet gave a trophy to.

The concours d'honneur was presided by Jean Dupuy, Minister of Agriculture.

Palmares of the concours d'honneur
Ranking	Name	Hometown	Notes
Gold	M. Goethiers (Note: Goethiers was a fisherman and a grocer from Bougival. He became notable in September, 1899, by catching more than 70 kg of bream, as reported by the New York Herald.)	Louveciennes	
Silver	Hyacinthe Lalanne	Amiens	Caught 47 fish
Bronze	N/A	Paris	
4	N/A	Paris	
5	N/A	Paris	

The Fishermen Society of Amiens, a fishing society based in Amiens, sent at least fifteen fishermen (and one fisherwoman) who distinguished themselves by wearing the same khaki outfit and a wide-brimmed hat. They were also accompanied by a brass band and a canteen woman. Their exploits earned them a triumphant welcome on their return to Amiens, where they were referred to in official speeches as "the first angling society in the entire world".

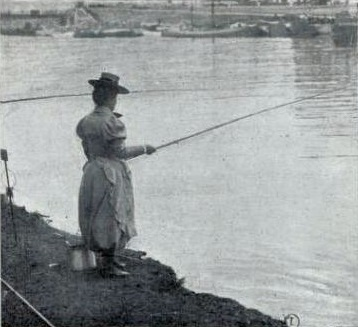
Mrs. B of the Fishermen Society of Amiens.

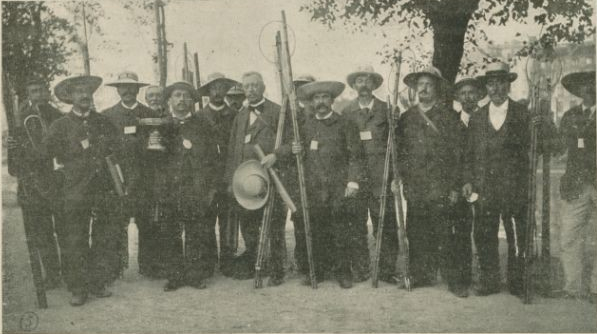
The men's team of the Fishermen Society of Amiens surrounding Elie Lesueur holding his trophy of "champion of the world"

== Spectators ==
Over the four days of competition, 20,000 spectators attended the angling competitions. Since the Sunday admissions only brought in 46 francs, despite the fact that there were between 8,000 and 9,000 spectators watching the competitions from afar, the organizing committee decided to no longer charge for admissions on the following days. The refreshment bar barely covered its costs.

== Finances ==
In total, the organization spent 18,105 francs, including 3,200 on advertising (brochures, posters, programs, etc.), 2,400 on preparing the competition venue (including mowing the grass on the bank), 2,500 in personnel costs and, above all, 5,600 francs in prizes during the heats and the concours d'honneur.

On the other hand, the competition received a subsidy of only 14,000 francs from the organization of the Universal Exhibition. In addition, the income barely exceeded 1,500 francs, mainly corresponding to the registrations of 500 of the competitors. A mere 46 francs were paid by spectators on Sunday before the organization committee decided that the entrance would be free.

== Official status ==
These events have generally not been classified as official, although the IOC has never decided which events were "Olympic" and which were not. There was no such designation at the time of the Games.

The ambiguity is based on the competition that developed after the 1896 Summer Olympic Games held in Athens between Pierre de Coubertin, who wanted to organize the Games of the Second Olympiad in Paris but who was unable to get his project off the ground, and Alfred Picard, the Commissioner General of the Universal Exhibition, who wanted to organize "international competitions for physical exercises and sports" as part of the Exhibition.

The body then governing sport in France, the Union des Sociétés Françaises de Sports Athlétiques, finally opted in November 1898 for the competitions at the Exhibition rather than for Coubertin's Games. The latter, who was president of the International Olympic Committee, was then forced in the spring of 1899 to accept the compromise suggested by the USFSA: "The competitions at the Exhibition will take the place of the Olympic Games for 1900 and will count as the equivalent of the second Olympiad."

Similarly, the concept of "Olympic Games" was little known at the time, unlike the contemporary situation. Also, many competitions were only called "world championships", a more popular term. It was therefore a posteriori that they became "Olympic".

== See also ==
- Pigeon racing at the 1900 Summer Olympics
- Pigeon shooting at the 1900 Summer Olympics

== Sources ==
- Drevon, André (2000). Les Jeux olympiques oubliés (in French). Paris: CNRS Éditions. ISBN 2-271-05838-4.
- Mallon, Bill (1998). The 1900 Olympic Games : Results for All Competitors in All Events, with Commentary. McFarland & Company. ISBN 978-0-7864-0378-3.
- Mérillon, Daniel (1901a). Rapports : Concours Internationaux d'exercices physiques et de sports (in French). Vol. 1. Paris: Imprimerie nationale. T1..
- Mérillon, Daniel (1901b). Rapports : Concours Internationaux d'exercices physiques et de sports (in French). Vol. 2. Paris: Imprimerie nationale. T2..
