= Fire fighting at the 1900 Summer Olympics =

Fire fighting was a contested event at the 1900 Summer Olympics in Paris, France. Competitions were held for both professional and volunteer firefighters.

Like all events held at the 1900 Games, the fire fighting event was considered part of the 1900 World's Fair. Fire fighting events have not been classified as official, although the IOC has never decided which events were "Olympic" and which were not. There was no such designation at the time of the Games. The American report of the 1900 Games, prepared by AG Spalding, devotes a whole page to the competition, which was won by Kansas City and "its famous engine and hook and ladder company No.1".

== Medal summary ==
| Event | Gold | Silver | Bronze |
|---|---|---|---|
| Volunteers | Porto; Portugal | (United Kingdom) Leyton; Great Britain | Budapest; Hungary |
| Professionals | Kansas City; United States | Milan; Italy | none |
