= Motor racing at the 1900 Summer Olympics =

Motor racing was contested at the 1900 Summer Olympics. Fourteen events were held in conjunction with the 1900 World's Fair.

== History ==
These events have generally not been classified as official, although the IOC has never decided which events were "Olympic" and which were not.

Entries were by manufacturers rather than drivers and competitors' names were not adequately reported at the time. The exceptions are the two classes of the Paris-Toulouse-Paris race, one class of which was won by Louis Renault. Most events had only French competitors but there were some international entries.

== Medal summary ==
Event	Gold	Silver	Bronze
2 seater car – Under 400 kg – 815 km – Race A	Unknown driver Unknown car France	Unknown driver Unknown car France	none
2 seater car – Under 400 kg – 815 km – Race B	Unknown driver Car – Renault; France	Unknown driver Car – Outhenin-Chaldenre; France	Unknown driver Car – Fernandez; France; Unknown driver Car – Hanzer; France
2 seater car – Over 400 kg	Unknown driver Car – Peugeot; France	Unknown driver Car – Delahaye; France	Unknown driver Car – Serpollet; France; Unknown driver Car – Rochet-Petit; France
4 seater car – Over 400 kg	Unknown driver Car – de Dietrich; France; Unknown driver Car – Delahaye; France		Unknown driver Car – Brouhot; France; Unknown driver Car – Hurtu; France
6 seater car – Over 400 kg	Unknown driver Car – Panhard-Levassor; France	Unknown driver Car – Brouhot; France	Unknown driver Car – Serpollet; France; Unknown driver Car – Georges Richard; France
7 seater car	not awarded	Unknown driver Car – Panhard-Levassor; France	none
Taxi – Petrol – 300 km	Unknown driver Unknown car France	Unknown driver Unknown car France	Unknown driver Unknown car France
Taxi – Electric – 300 km	Unknown driver Unknown car France	Unknown driver Unknown car France	Unknown driver Unknown car France
Delivery Van – 500 to 1200 kg – Petrol – 300 km	Unknown driver Unknown car France	Unknown driver Unknown car France	Unknown driver Unknown car France
Delivery Van – 500 to 1200 kg – Electric – 300 km	Unknown driver Unknown car France	Unknown driver Unknown car France	none
Small Truck – Over 1000 kg – 300 km	Unknown driver Car – de Dion-Bouton; France; Unknown driver Car – Peugeot; France	none	Unknown driver Car – Riker Electric; United States
Truck	Unknown driver Car – de Dion-Bouton (I); France; Unknown driver Car – Peugeot; France; Unknown driver Car – de Dion-Bouton (II); France; Unknown driver Car – Panhard-Levassor; France	none	none
Fire Truck	(United States) Gilbert Brown; Car – Unknown truck USA	none	none
Paris-Toulouse-Paris – Small Car	Louis Renault; Car – Renault; France	Schrader; Car – Renault-Aster; France	Grus; Car – Renault; France
Paris-Toulouse-Paris – Large Car	"Levegh" (Alfred Velghe); Car – Mors; France	Arthur Pinson; Car – Panhard-Levassor; France	Émile Voigt; Car – Panhard-Levassor; France
