= Cannon shooting at the 1900 Summer Olympics =

Cannon shooting was contested in the 1900 Olympic Games in Paris. It consisted of 17 events, all for men. Only French competitors participated. Cannon shooting has not yet been classified as official, although the IOC has never decided which events were "Olympic" and which were not. There was no such designation at the time of the Games.
