= Motorcycle racing at the 1900 Summer Olympics =

- IOC Code: MCS
- Governing body: FIM
- Events: 2 (mixed)

Summer Olympics
- 1896; 1900; 1904; 1908; 1912; 1920; 1924; 1928; 1932; 1936; 1948; 1952; 1956; 1960; 1964; 1968; 1972; 1976; 1980; 1984; 1988; 1992; 1996; 2000; 2004; 2008; 2012; 2016; 2020; 2024; 2028; 2032; Note: demonstration or exhibition sport years indicated in italics
- Medalists

Motorcycle racing was featured in the Summer Olympic Games programme in 1900 (two events). These events have generally not been classified as official, although the IOC has never decided which events were "Olympic" and which were not. Events involving motorized transport were later excluded from the Games.

== Results ==
Race A (1 mile): A. Jordan USA 2:10.0
Race B (1 mile): E. Holloway USA 1:54.4

== See also ==
- 1900 Summer Olympics
- Motorcycle racing
