= Kite flying at the 1900 Summer Olympics =

Kite flying was on the Summer Olympic Games programme in 1900. These events have generally not been classified as official, although the IOC has never decided which events were "Olympic" and which were not. Kite flying events are sometimes classified under ballooning.

== See also ==
- 1900 Summer Olympics
- Kite flying
