= Military exercise at the 1900 Summer Olympics =

Military exercise was contested at the 1900 World's Fair alongside the program of the 1900 Olympic Games.

According to Olympedia, a database of Olympic Games results created by historians including Bill Mallon, the event doubled as the 1900 annual feast of the Union des sociétés d’instruction militaire de France. It was entered by 80 clubs across a variety of sports and exercises, with prizes awarded for clubs' overall performance, as well as performances in three different sections (Preparatory Military Training, Complementary Military Training and Free Exercise). Military exercise, like many events at the 1900 World's Fair, is not considered to have been officially Olympic.
