= Life saving at the 1900 Summer Olympics =

Life saving was on the Summer Olympic Games programme in 1900. These events have generally not been classified as official, although the IOC has never decided which events were "Olympic" and which were not.
