= Mary Abbott (golfer) =

American golfer and novelist

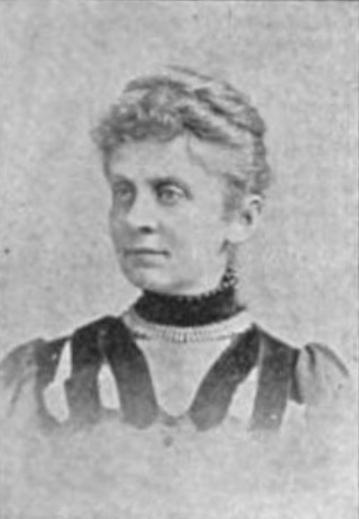
- Mary Abbott before or during 1891

Personal information
- Born: October 17, 1857 Salem, Massachusetts
- Died: February 9, 1904 (aged 46) Miami, Florida
- Sporting nationality: United States
- Children: 3, including Margaret

Career
- Status: Amateur

Mary Perkins Ives Abbott (October 17, 1857 – February 9, 1904) was an American writer, golfer, reviewer and novelist.

She was born in Salem, Massachusetts. After marrying Charles Abbott, she moved to Calcutta, India (now Kolkata) with him. There she bore three children – Margaret, Charles Jr., and Sprague. Her husband died in August 1879 and she returned to the United States to live in Chicago, where her brother lived. She began a career as a successful writer there, penning her first novel, Alexia, in 1889 and then The Beverlys: A Story of Calcutta in 1890. Both sold well, and she later wrote essays for the Chicago Tribune and the Chicago Evening Post. As her writing career catapulted her into Chicago's higher class, she opened a literary salon. There, she befriended golfer and course designer Charles B. Macdonald, who introduced Mary and her daughter, Margaret, to the game at his own Chicago Golf Club.

Abbott competed at the 1900 Summer Olympics golf tournament, where she finished tied for seventh place. A historic record, both she and her daughter, Margaret Abbott, the first ever female gold medalist at the games, competed in the event.

A biographer of writer Finley Peter Dunne, Elmer Ellis, noted that Abbott, a widow who had lived for some years in Calcutta, moved to Chicago where she reviewed books for the Evening Post and the two (Abbott and Dunne) became acquainted. Dunne held her to be "the wittiest woman he had ever met". She recognized his genius and helped him throughout his career. The acquaintanceship with Abbott, who was a popular dinner guest in Chicago society, launched Dunne into those social circles and with those connections as well as his own writing, Dunne became prominent in Chicago. In 1902, he would become her son-in-law, when he married her daughter, Margaret.

Abbott died in 1904 in Miami, Florida.
