= 1900 Summer Olympics =

Multi-sport event in Paris, France

Games of the II Olympiad
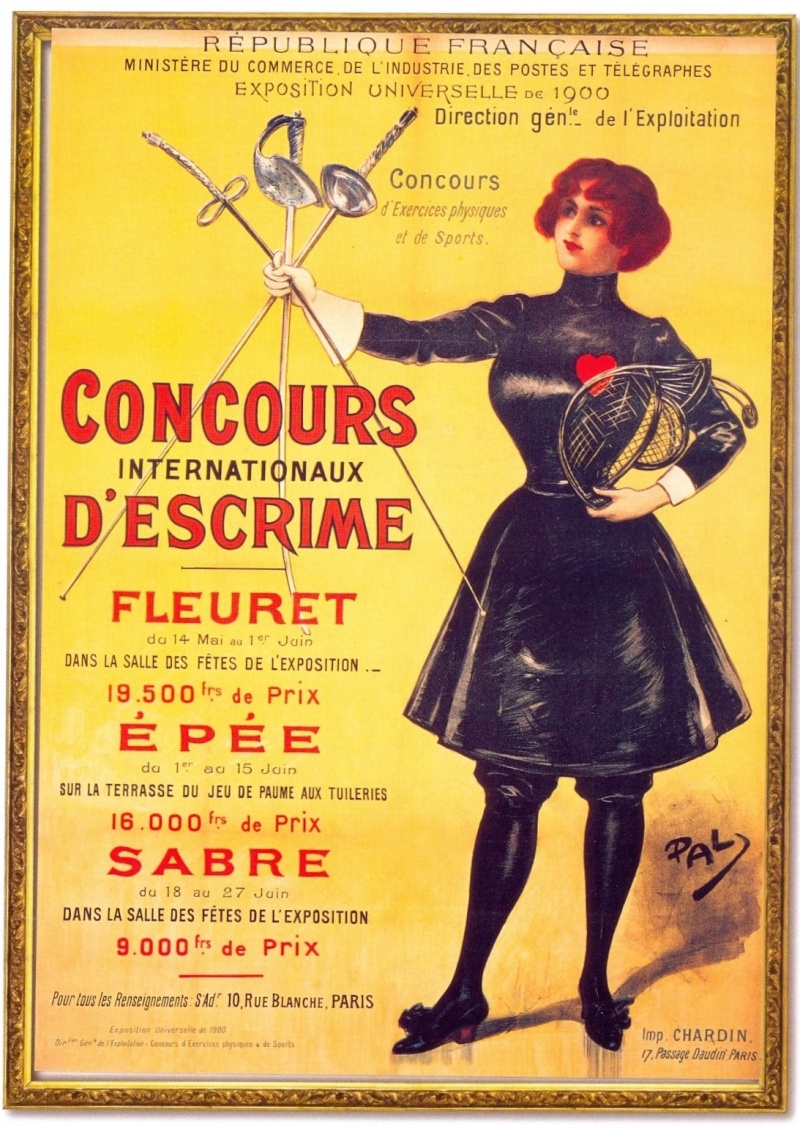
- Poster for the fencing events at the 1900 Summer Olympics
- Location: Paris, France
- Nations: 26^{[note1]}
- Athletes: 1226^{[note1]}
- Events: 95 in 19 sports (21 disciplines) ^{[note1]}
- Opening: 14 May 1900
- Closing: 28 October 1900
- Stadium: Vélodrome de Vincennes

The 1900 Summer Olympics (French: Jeux olympiques d'été de 1900), today officially known as the Games of the II Olympiad (Jeux de la II^{e} olympiade) and also known as Paris 1900, were an international multi-sport event that took place in Paris, France, from 14 May to 28 October 1900. No opening or closing ceremonies were held. It was the first and only Summer Olympics to take place in a common year until the 2021 Summer Olympics, which was a postponement from 2020 due to the COVID-19 pandemic.

At the Olympic Congress of 1894, which convened in the Sorbonne building, Pierre de Coubertin proposed that the Olympic Games should take place in Paris in 1900. However, the delegates to the conference were unwilling to wait six years and lobbied to hold the first games in 1896. A decision was made to hold the first Olympic Games in 1896 in Athens and have Paris host the second Games.

The Games were held as part of the 1900 Exposition Universelle (World's Fair). In total, 1,226 competitors took part in 19 different sports.^{[note1]} This number relies on certain assumptions about which events were and were not "Olympic". Many athletes, some of whom had won events, were unaware they had competed in the Olympic Games. Women took part in the games for the first time, with sailor Hélène de Pourtalès, born Helen Barbey in New York City, becoming the first female Olympic champion. The decision to hold competitions on a Sunday brought protests from many American athletes, who traveled as representatives of their colleges and were expected to withdraw rather than compete on their religious day of rest.

Most of the winners in 1900 did not receive medals but were given cups or trophies. Professionals competed in fencing, as was tradition, and Albert Robert Ayat (France), who won the épée for amateurs and masters, was awarded a prize of 3,000 F (equivalent to €13,896 in 2025). Some events were contested for the only time in the history of the Games, including angling, motor racing, ballooning, cricket, croquet, Basque pelota, 200m swimming obstacle race and underwater swimming. This was also the only Olympic Games in history to use live animals (pigeons) as targets during the shooting event. The host nation of France fielded 72% of all athletes (720 of the 997) and won the most gold, silver and bronze medal placings. U.S. athletes won the second-most in each while fielding the fifth-most participants, 75. British athletes won the third-most in each while fielding the second most participants, 102.

== Organization ==
The 1900 Games were held as part of the 1900 Exposition Universelle. The Baron de Coubertin believed this would help public awareness of the Olympics and submitted elaborate plans to rebuild the ancient site of Olympia, complete with statues, temples, stadia, and gymnasia. The director of the Exposition Universelle, Alfred Picard, thought holding an ancient sport event at the Exposition Universelle was an "absurd anachronism". After thanking de Coubertin for his plans, Picard filed them away and nothing more came of it.

A committee was formed for the organization of the Games, consisting of some of the more able sports administrators of the day, and a provisional program was drawn up. Sports to be included at the games were track and field athletics, swimming, wrestling, gymnastics, fencing, French and British boxing, river and ocean yacht racing, cycling, golf, lifesaving, archery, weightlifting, rowing, diving, and water polo.

British and Irish sports associations and several influential American universities and sports clubs announced their desire to compete. Competitors from Russia and Australia also confirmed their intentions to travel to Paris.

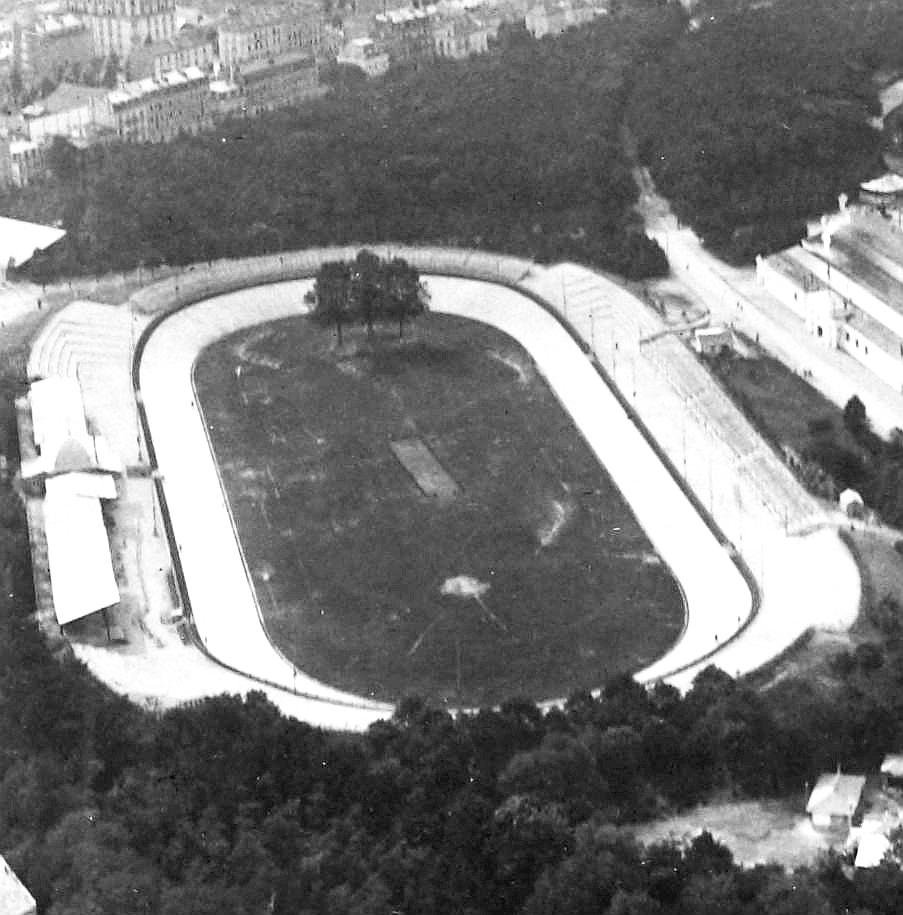
Vélodrome de Vincennes

On 9 November 1898, the Union des Sociétés Françaises de Sports Athlétiques ("Union of the French Societies for Athletic Sports" or USFSA) announced that it would have the sole right to any organized sport held during the World's Fair. It was an empty threat, but Viscount Charles de La Rochefoucauld, the nominated head of the organizing committee, stepped down rather than be embroiled in the political battle. The Baron de Coubertin, also secretary-general of the USFSA, was urged to withdraw from active involvement in running the Games and did so, only to comment later, "I surrendered—and was incorrect in doing so."

The IOC ceded control of the Games to a new committee to oversee every sporting activity connected to the 1900 Exposition Universelle. Alfred Picard appointed Daniel Mérillon, the head of the French Shooting Association, as president of this organization in February 1899. Mérillon published an entirely different schedule of events, which resulted in many of those who had made plans to compete with the original program withdrawing and refusing to deal with the new committee.

Between May and October 1900, the new organizing committee held many sporting activities alongside the Paris Exposition. The term "Olympic" was rarely used in these events; indeed, the term "Olympic Games" was replaced by "Concours internationaux d'exercices physiques et de sport" ("International contests of physical exercises and of sport" in English) in the official report of the sporting events of the 1900 Exposition Universelle. The press reported competitions variously as "International Championships", "International Games", "Paris Championships", "World Championships" and "Grand Prix of the Paris Exposition".

These poorly organized games, along with those of 1904, were termed decades later by several historians "The Farcical Games". Years later, many competitors were unaware that they had competed in the Olympics. While there is an Official Report of these Games, complete records of results do not exist. De Coubertin commented later to friends, "It's a miracle that the Olympic Movement survived that celebration".

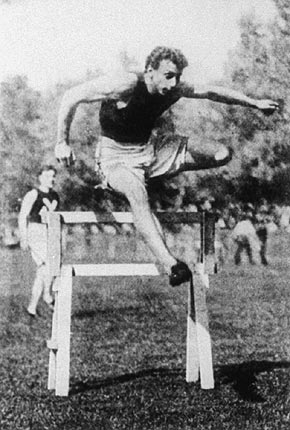
Alvin Kraenzlein Winner of the 60 m, the 110 m hurdles, the 200 m hurdles, and the long jump

== Highlights ==
- These Olympic Games were the first organised under the IOC Presidency of Pierre de Coubertin
- Alvin Kraenzlein (United States) won the 60 metres (he was one of two people to ever win this event at the Olympic Games as it was withdrawn from Olympic competition after the 1904 Olympics), the 110 metre hurdles, the 200 metre hurdles and the long jump events; as of 2005, these four individual gold medals are still a record for a track and field athlete. For his victory in the long jump, he was allegedly punched in the face by his rival Meyer Prinstein, who was prevented from competing in the final by officials of Syracuse University because it was scheduled for a Sunday.
- American-born Hélène de Pourtalès became the first female Olympic champion as part of the Swiss winning team in the 1-2 ton sailing event. Two months later, Charlotte Cooper (UK) became the first woman to win an individual Olympic event after winning the women's singles tennis competition. She later went on to win the mixed doubles tournament.
- Three marathon runners from the United States contested the result saying the French runners who got first and second places took a short cut, and in fact they were the only contestants not spattered with mud.
- In the coxed pairs and eights events in rowing, crews replaced adult coxswain with children. The identities and ages of these boys were not recorded but they are believed to have been among the youngest of all Olympic competitors.

== Sports ==
Before July 2021, the IOC had never decided which events were "Olympic". In fact, Pierre de Coubertin had ceded that entire determination to the organizers. The IOC webpage for the 1900 Summer Olympics affirms a total of 95 medal events.^{[note1]} Weightlifting and wrestling were dropped since the 1896 Summer Olympics, while 12 new sports were added. (Note: Swimming and water polo are considered to be two disciplines within a single sport of aquatics in the Olympic context.) Among the sports below, only croquet was not an international competition, being contested by French players only. The number of events in each discipline is noted in parentheses.

- Aquatics
  - Swimming (7)
  - Water polo (1)
- Archery (7)
- Athletics (23)
- Basque pelota (1)
- Cricket (1)
- Croquet (3)
- Cycling (3)
- Equestrian
  - Driving (2)
  - Jumping (3)
- Fencing (7)
- Football (1)
- Golf (2)
- Gymnastics (1)
- Polo (1)
- Rowing (5)
- Rugby union (1)
- Sailing (13)
- Shooting (8)
- Tennis (4)
- Tug of war (1)

== Venues ==
14 venues were used at the 1900 Summer Olympics to host 20 sports.

Map of Paris with Olympic venues marked. Satory is further west, off-map. Compiègne and Le Havre are not shown.
Map of France with Olympic venues marked.

Venue	Sports	Capacity	Ref.
7th arrondissement (Place de Breteuil)	Equestrian	Not listed.	
Bois de Boulogne	Croquet, Polo, Tug of war	Not listed.	
Bois de Vincennes	Archery	Not listed.	
Boulogne-Billancourt	Shooting	Not listed.	
Compiègne	Golf	Not listed.	
Croix-Catelan Stadium	Athletics	Not listed.	
Le Havre	Sailing	Not listed.	
Meulan-en-Yvelines	Sailing	Not listed.	
Neuilly-sur-Seine	Basque pelota	Not listed.	
Puteaux	Tennis	Not listed.	
Satory	Shooting	Not listed.	
Seine	Rowing, Swimming, and Water polo	Not listed.	
Tuileries Garden	Fencing	Not listed.	
Vélodrome de Vincennes	Cricket, Cycling, Football, Gymnastics, and Rugby union	Not listed.	

== Sport-by-sport overview ==
The standard of competition at the Games was variable. Despite a poor-quality track, a strong contingent of top-class American collegiate athletes ensured the track and field competitions were of the highest quality. The tennis gold medalists were all former Wimbledon champions; swimming and fencing events were of a good standard; and even polo, a minority sport for the social elite, was well represented by some of the best players in the game. Other sports were noticeably weak in both quality and depth. Only athletics, swimming and fencing had competitors from more than ten nations.

=== Archery ===
The history of the archery competition at the 1900 Olympics is one of confusion. The IOC currently lists six events with Olympic status, but a case has been made that as many as eight other events equally deserve to be considered part of official Olympic history. About 150 archers competed in the six events that later had official status conferred. However, as many as 5,000 were involved in archery competition in conjunction with the 1900 World's Fair. Belgian Hubert Van Innis took two gold medals and one silver and would add to his tally twenty years later in Antwerp.

=== Athletics ===
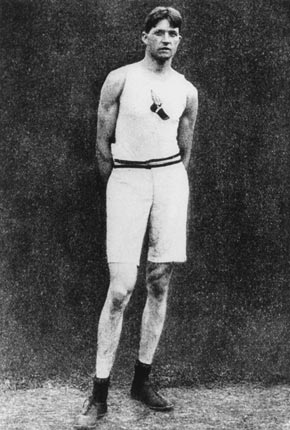
Ray Ewry, the winner of the standing high jump and standing long jump.

The track and field events were held at the home of the Racing Club de France at the Croix-Catelan stadium in Bois de Boulogne. No track was laid and races took place on an uneven field of grass littered with trees. Additional events were held for professionals and a series of handicap races also took place. These are not considered official Olympic events.

==== The sprints ====
In the seven events contested over 400 metres or less, the United States took 13 out of a possible 21 medals. Athletes from Columbia University, Princeton University and the University of Pennsylvania all won gold medals. Indeed, two would-be dentists from the University of Pennsylvania were among the stars of the Games. Alvin Kraenzlein won 4 individual gold medals, a feat that has never repeated, while Walter Tewksbury took five medals including two golds. The hurdles in the 400 m hurdle race were 30-foot (9.1 m)-long telegraph poles arranged on the track and the race, uniquely in Olympic competition, had a water jump on the final straight. Adolphe Klingelhoeffer, who had Brazilian citizenship in 1900, competed for France in three events.

==== Middle- and long-distance races ====
United States dominance in sprinting was matched in the longer track races by United Kingdom. Only George Orton, who won Canada's first Olympic title in the shorter of the two steeplechases, ruined a perfect record for the British. Orton won his title less than an hour after placing third in the 400-metre hurdles.

==== The Marathon ====
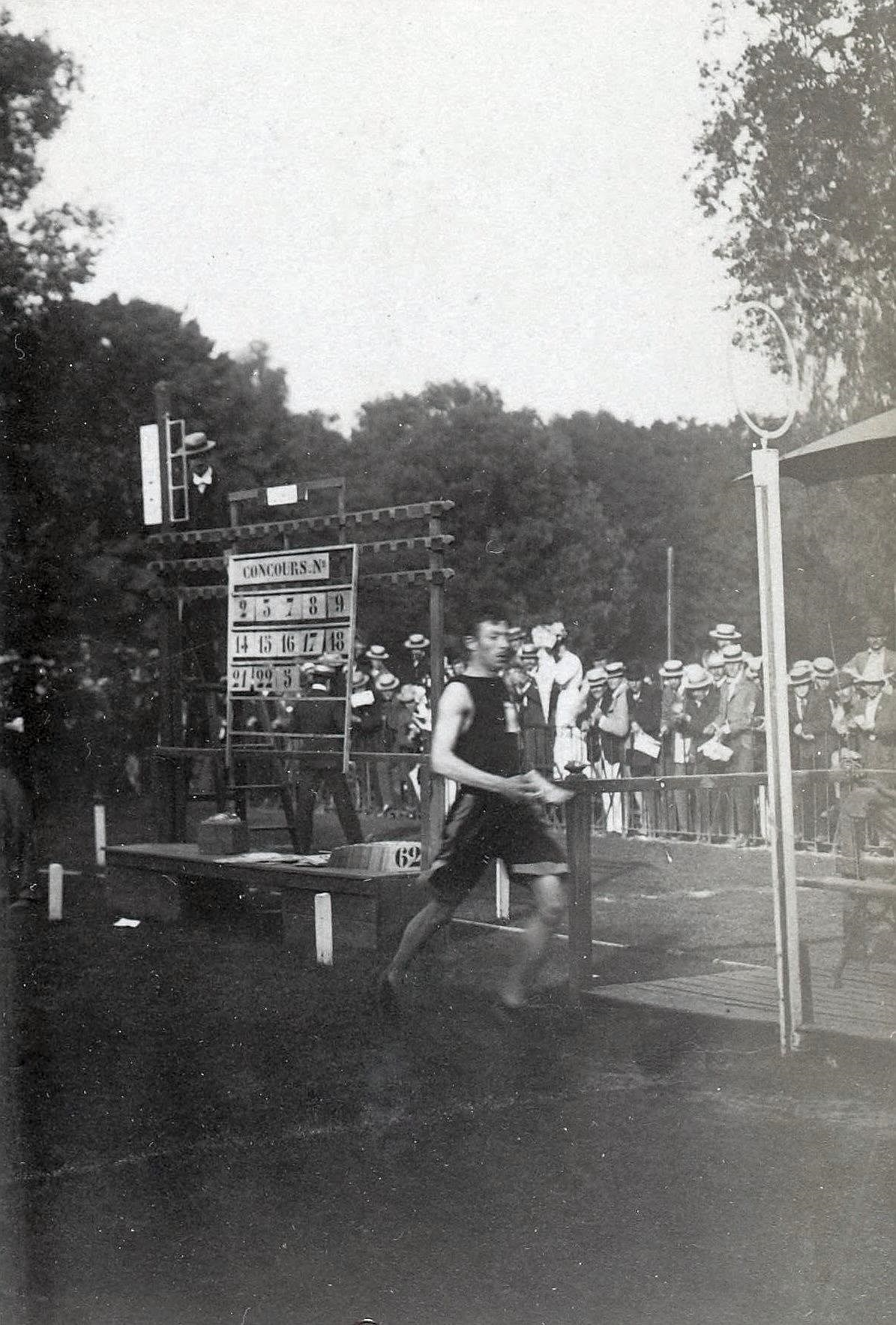
Arrival of Michel Théato during the marathon, an event which he won, photographed by Jules Beau

The most contentious of all the events in these Games began and ended in the Bois de Boulogne. Intended to follow the track of the old city wall, the course was poorly marked out and runners often got lost and had to double back on themselves before continuing. On some parts of the course, runners had to contend with distractions from cars, bicycles, pedestrians and animals. Arthur Newton of the United States finished fifth but stated he had not been passed by any other runner during the race. Another American, Richard Grant, claimed he was run down by a cyclist as he made ground on the leaders. French honour seemed to have been satisfied when Michel Théato crossed the finish line and a military band struck up La Marseillaise. However, modern research has revealed that Théato was born in Luxembourg and maintained Luxembourgian citizenship throughout his life.

==== Field events ====
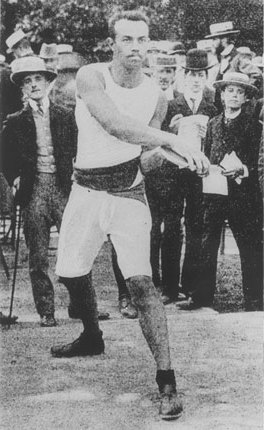
Rudolf Bauer of Hungary won the discus

The Hungarian discus thrower Rudolf Bauer was the only non-American crowned as Olympic Champion. American domination was even greater in the field events than the track events, with outstanding performances coming from Ray Ewry and Irving Baxter. Ewry started his Olympic career with a sweep of the three standing jumps, while Baxter finished second to Ewry three times and won both the regular high jump and pole vault. Meyer Prinstein became the first Jewish Olympic gold medalist in the triple jump.

=== Basque pelota ===
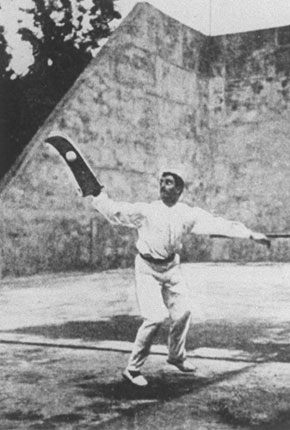
A competitor at the Pelota tournament

The chistera form of the game was played at this, the sport's only appearance at full Olympic level. Two pairs entered and the Spanish partnerships of Amezola and Villota became their nations' first Olympic champions. The mano form of the game and a chistera tournament for professional players were contested unofficially.

=== Cricket ===
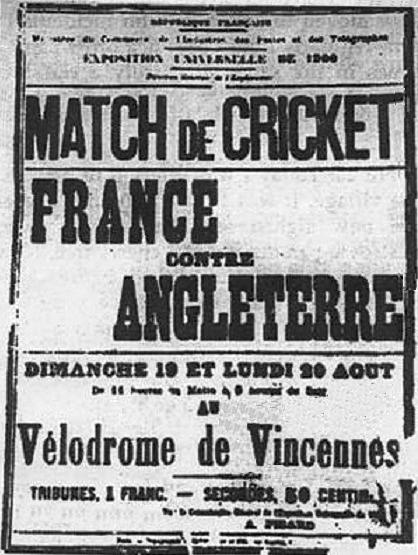
Poster of the only Olympic cricket match

After the withdrawal of teams from the Netherlands and Belgium, only two teams played in the cricket tournament. A team made up of players from the Albion Cricket Club and the Standard Athletic Club, two Paris clubs consisting almost exclusively of British expatriates, played a touring team from the southwest of England. The Devon and Somerset Wanderers were no more than a team of competent club cricketers (made up from Blundells School old boys and members of Castle Cary Cricket Club), and only Montagu Toller and Alfred Bowerman were deemed good enough to play at county level for Somerset. The game was played before a small crowd at the Vélodrome de Vincennes. An emphatic second innings bowling performance from Toller captured victory for the visitors as time appeared to be running out for them. If the French had held out for five more minutes the game would have been a draw. Knowledge of the game would have been lost but for the forethought of John Symes, a member of the victorious team, who kept a scorecard in his own writing.

=== Croquet ===
The croquet tournament was notable as it marked the first appearance of women at Olympic level. Madame Desprès, Madame Filleul-Brohy and Mademoiselle Ohier were eliminated in the first round of competition. All players were French. A single paying spectator attended the tournament, an elderly English gentleman who travelled from Nice for the early stages. An unofficial two-ball handicap competition was also held. This was also the only Olympiad where croquet was part of the official programme, though there was the variant called roque at the 1904 Summer Olympics.

=== Cycling ===
The home nation won six of the nine medals available, including one that was initially awarded to Great Britain until this was reversed in 2024. A number of unofficial events were held for both amateurs and professionals.

=== Equestrian ===
Equestrian sport made its debut at the Olympic Games with three jumping events being held, plus two other events. The Italian rider Gian Giorgio Trissino won a gold and a silver. He narrowly missed making Olympic history by winning two medals in the same event. Competing with two different horses in the high jump, he jointly won the gold medal and finished in 4th place on his second horse.

=== Fencing ===
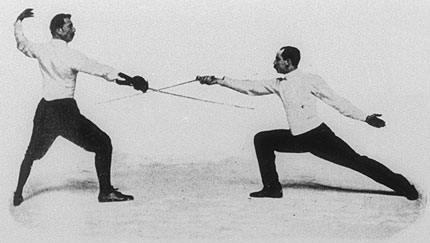
Italo Santelli (left) and Jean-Baptiste Mimiague competing in the masters foil event. Mimiague won both bouts between the two.

Nineteen nations were represented in the fencing competition, which was held in a field near the cutlery exhibit at the 1900 World's Fair. French fencers dominated the proceedings but both Cuba and Italy also took titles. The early rounds of the foil competitions were judged on style rather than the actual result of the contest. This meant that some fencers were eliminated without losing a contest while others were defeated and still progressed to the next rounds.

=== Football ===
The first football champions at the Olympics were the London amateurs of Upton Park F.C. A crowd of around 500 spectators saw them defeat their French rivals.

=== Golf ===
Margaret Ives Abbott, a student of art from Chicago, played in and won a nine-hole golf tournament on an October Tuesday in Paris. She died in 1955 without being aware that the tournament was part of the Olympic Games and she had become America's first ever female Olympic champion.

=== Gymnastics ===
135 gymnasts took part in a competition that involved elements from track and field and weightlifting as well as gymnastic disciplines.

=== Polo ===
Eight separate tournaments were held in 1900 as part of the 1900 World's Fair. Only the Grand Prix Internationale de l'Exposition is counted as an official medal event. Entries were from clubs rather than countries, and the winning Foxhunters club comprised English, Irish and American players.

Mexico won its first medal in this sport, a bronze won by Guillermo Hayden Wright, Marquez de Villavieja and three brothers: Eustaquio de Escandón y Barron, Pablo de Escandón y Barron and Manuel de Escandón y Barron.

=== Rowing ===
Competitions were held on the River Seine. The coxed fours event descended into disarray after the officials changed the qualifying criteria for the final several times, culminating in two finals: the first final was held without the original qualifiers, who boycotted the race to protest the decision to run six boats on a course laid out for four boats. Following this, officials decided to run another final for the boycotting crews. Both events are considered official Olympic competitions.

In a number of events, crews saw the advantage of having ultra-lightweight coxswains and recruited local boys for race days. Most of these remain a mystery; some could have been under ten years old.

=== Rugby union ===
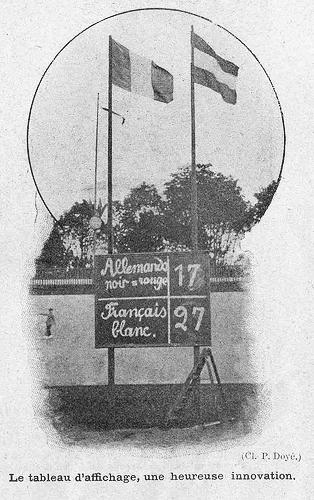
Scoreboard with result of France-Germany rugby game

Three teams competed in the Rugby tournament. A French representative team defeated a team from the German city of Frankfurt and Moseley Wanderers from England. The Moseley team had played a full game of rugby in England the day before they made the journey to Paris. They arrived in the morning, played the match in the afternoon and were back in their home country by the next morning. The proposed game between the British and German sides was cancelled, and both are credited as silver medalists. The Franco-Haitian centre Constantin Henriquez become the first black gold medalist.

=== Sailing ===
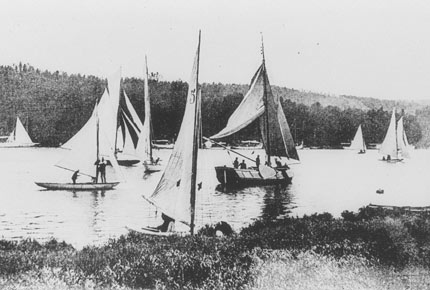
The Olympic regatta

The 1900 sailing regatta differs from every other Olympic regatta in a number of ways. In most classes, there were two distinct "finals", boats were assigned time handicaps according to their weight within each class and cash prizes were handed out to the winner of each race. The IOC initially recognized the winner of the first race in each class as Olympic champion except in the case of the 10-20 ton class, which was decided on aggregate time over three races. However currently the participants of both first and second races in 3 classes (0-0.5t, 1-2t and 2-3t) are present in the as medalists, so the second races in these 3 classes were recognized by the IOC, as recommended by Olympic historian Bill Mallon. To support the recognition of a total of 95 medal events per Mallon's suggestion, one more race in each of 2 other classes (0.5-1t and 3-10t) has been recognized by the IOC. Thus, for five of the eight events, two gold, two silver and two bronze medals were retrospectively awarded. Races were held at both Meulan and Le Havre and medals shared among five nations. France and Great Britain were the most successful of the countries involved. A number of people named as members of medal-winning crews by the IOC have been proved not to have competed; others have their participation seriously questioned by historical research.

=== Shooting ===
Switzerland's Konrad Stäheli was the outstanding marksman of the Games, taking a trio of titles and leading his country to the top of the shooting medal table. The medals were shared between six different nations. There is a debate as to whether the live pigeon shooting event was a full Olympic event, Belgian Leon Lunden shot twenty-one birds on his way to the championship. Up to thirty unofficial shooting events were also held, most involving professional marksmen. Research has shown that one of the medal events in the IOC database (25m rapid fire pistol, also called military pistol cat. 6) was contested by professionals.

=== Swimming ===
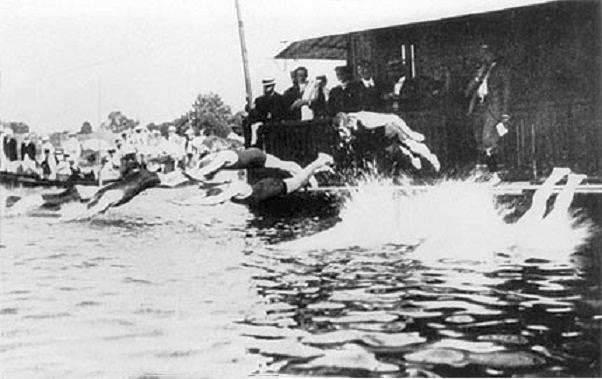
Swimming race in the river Seine

The muddied waters of the Seine hosted the swimming events in 1900. Run with the current, the races produced very fast times by the standards of the day. John Arthur Jarvis of Great Britain, Frederick Lane of Australia and the German Ernst Hoppenberg each won two titles. Lane received a 50-pound bronze statue of a horse as a prize. A couple of unusual events were held. The obstacle race required both swimming underneath and climbing over rows of boats while Charles de Venville stayed submerged for over a minute to win the underwater swimming event.

=== Tennis ===
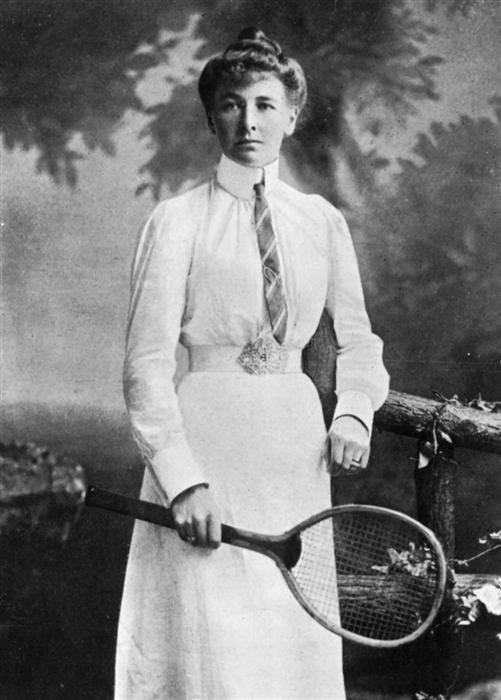
Charlotte Cooper, the first individual female Olympic champion

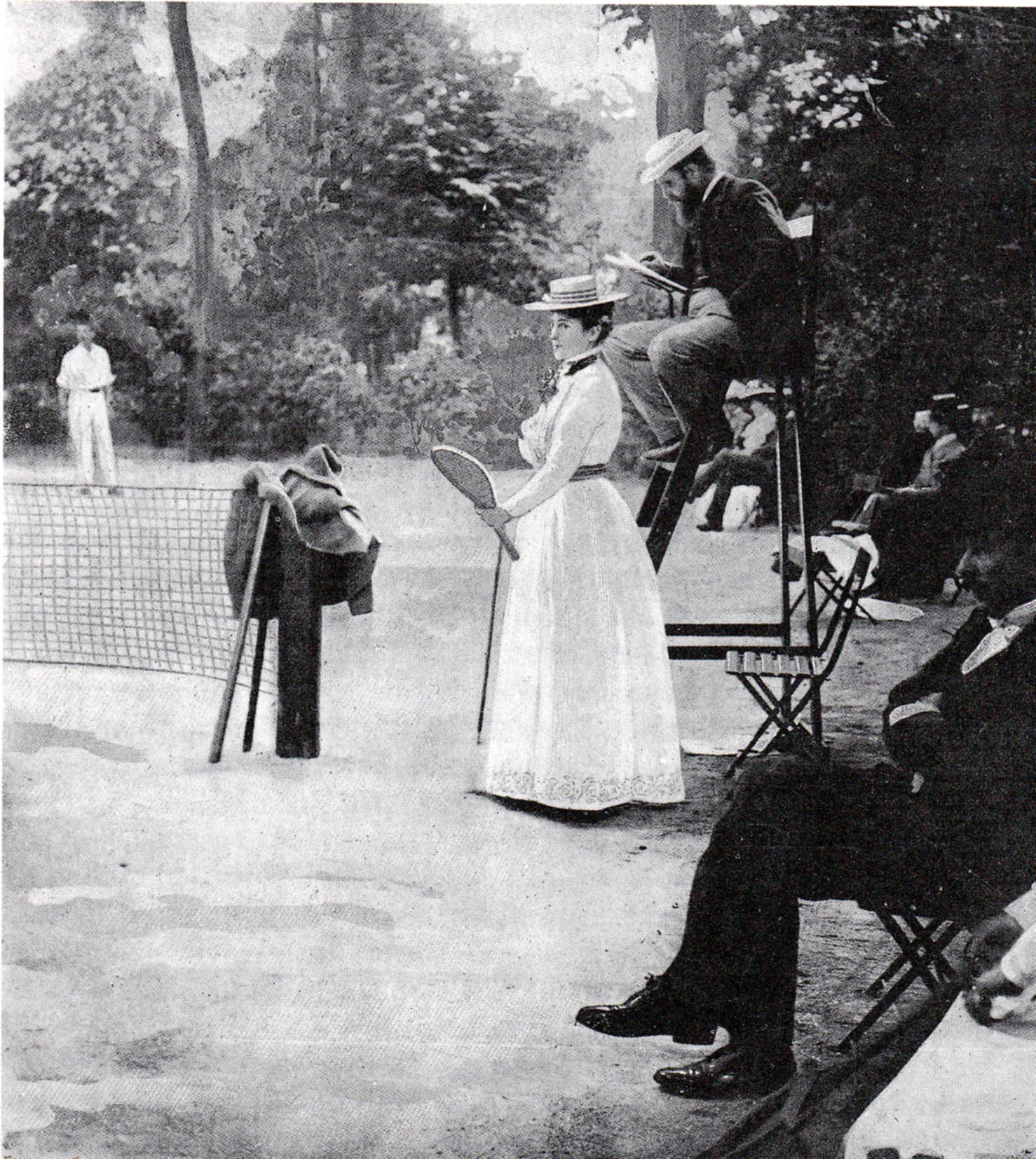
French contestant at the 1900 Olympic Games tennis tournament, at the Tennis court Cercles des Sports de l'Ile de Puteaux, Paris. Cover page of magazine La vie au grand air, No 97 from July 22, 1900.

A high-quality men's tournament saw three past or future Wimbledon champions reach the semi-finals. Laurence Doherty reached the final when older brother Reggie stepped aside and let his sibling advance to the final. The two refused to play each other in what they considered a minor tournament. On the 11th of July a landmark was reached in the history of the Olympic Games. Charlotte Cooper, already three times Wimbledon champion, took the singles championship to become the first individual female Olympic champion, also winning the mixed doubles event.

=== Tug of war ===
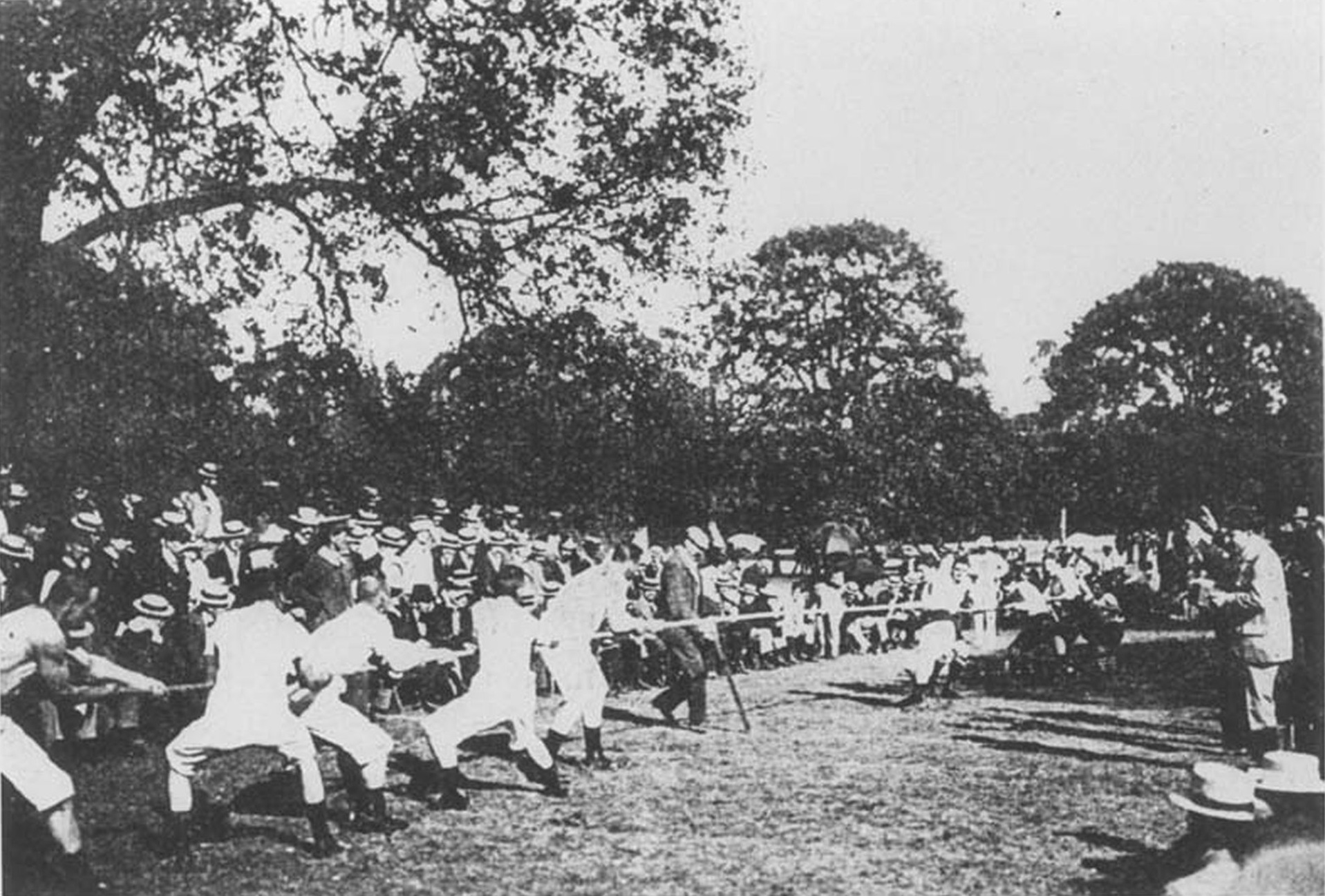
A combined Swedish/Danish team beats France for Gold in the tug of war

A combined Sweden/Denmark team, made up of three competitors from each country, defeated the French team to win the title. One of the members of the French team was a Colombian citizen. They were left as the only participating teams; the United States had entered but were forced to scratch as three of their team were involved in the final of the hammer. Edgar Aabye was a journalist covering the Games for the Danish newspaper Politiken and was asked to join the team when another puller was taken ill.

=== Water polo ===
Osborne Swimming Club, representing Great Britain, were unchallenged in the tournament, scoring 29 goals and conceding only 3 in their 3 matches. In the final, they limited the number of shots on goal to avoid humiliating their opponents. One of its team members, Victor Lindberg, was from New Zealand, while Thomas William Burgess of the bronze medal-winning Libellule de Paris team represented Great Britain in the swimming events.

== Olympic status of sports and events ==
The 1900 Games were not governed by a specific Olympic organizing committee, but were instead held as an appendage to the 1900 World's Fair. An enormous number of events was held, though many fall short of the standards later required for Olympic championship status.

After the several initial editions of the Olympic Games, decisions as to which Olympic events were termed "official" and which had "unofficial" or "demonstration" status were usually left to the Olympic organizing committees and/or the IOC. In the early Olympic Games, however, no decision as to the official status of any event was made at the time of the Games.

While a document from 1912 exists, listing results from the 1900 Games, and formed the original basis of the results of the Paris games in the IOC database, the reliability and authenticity of this paper has been questioned by Olympic historians. Further complicating matters, the IOC has never determined which events were Olympic and which were not.

All events satisfying all four of the retrospective selection criteria (restricted to amateurs, international participation, open to all competitors and without handicapping) are now regarded by historians as Olympic events, except for ballooning, while croquet, motorboating and boules satisfied three of these criteria (as only French athletes competed).

Of the three events that satisfied three criteria, only croquet has been accorded Olympic status. In this regard, one of the ten croquet players, Marcel Haëntjens, had been believed to be Belgian, and the croquet events were thus considered as international. Despite the Flemish name, it was discovered in recent times that Haëntjens was French.

Like all the Olympic events widely regarded as official, there were other events conducted during the 1900 World's Fair:

- Angling
- Ballooning (hydrogen-filled, non-fuelled)
- Baseball
- Boules
- Cannon shooting
- Fire fighting
- Kite flying
- Life saving
- Longue paume
- Military exercise
- Motor racing
- Motorcycle racing
- Pigeon racing
- Water motorsports

Scholastic and military events were also held across a range of sports. Four planned competitions were not organized due to a lack of participants: balle au tamis, field hockey, jeu de paume and lacrosse.

== Participating nations ==
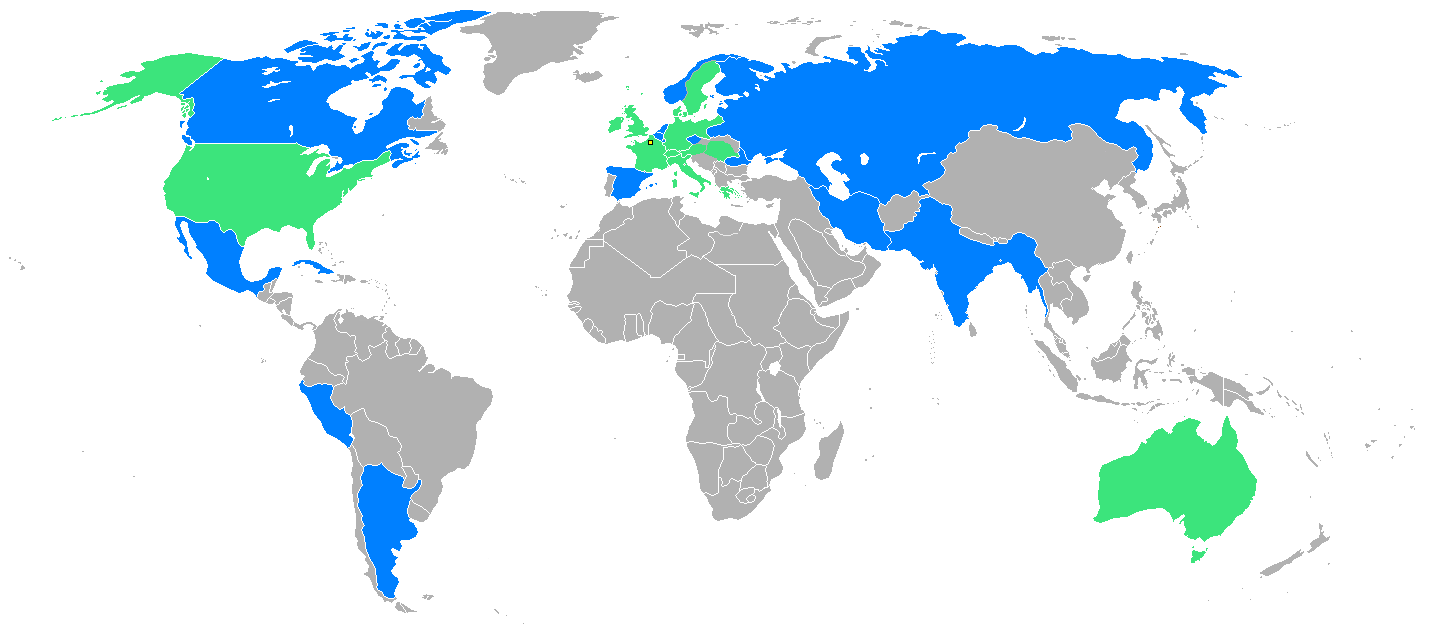
Participating countries

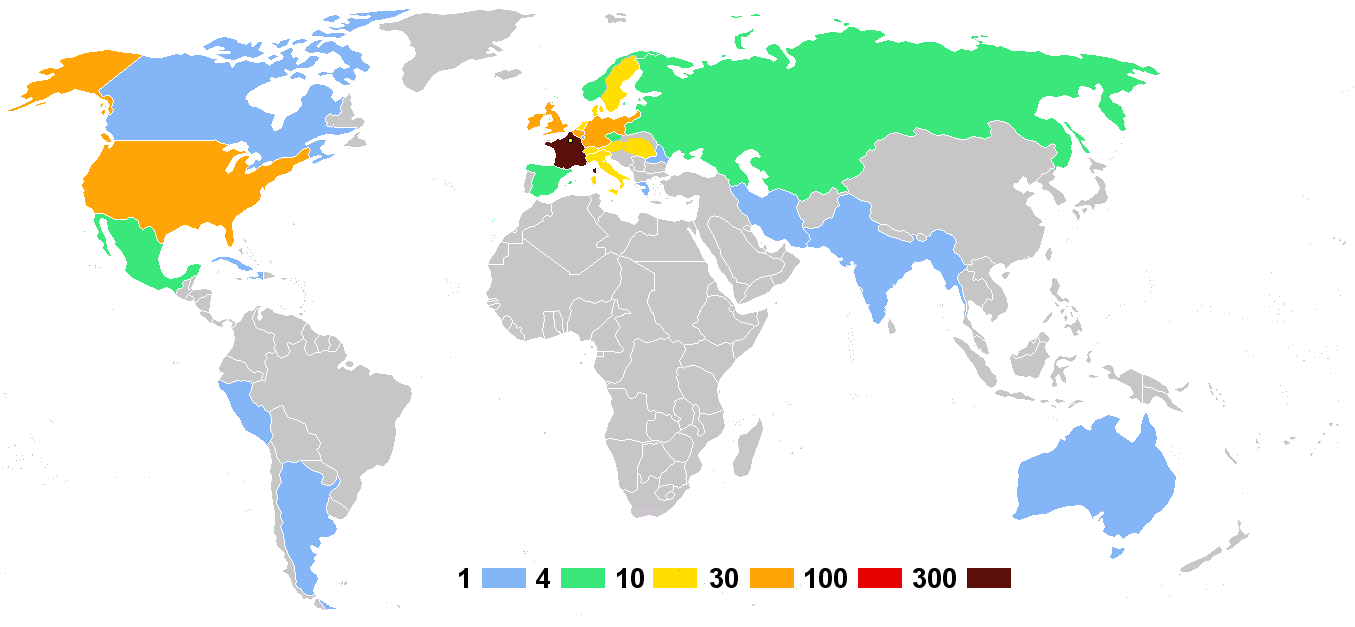
Number of athletes from each country

According to the International Olympic Committee, 26 nations sent competitors to this edition.^{[note1]} The concept of "national teams" chosen by National Olympic Committees did not exist at this point in time.

When counting the number of participating countries in the early Olympic Games, the IOC does not take into account otherwise unrepresented countries whose citizens competed for other countries. Modern research shows that at the 1900 Olympics, the athletes of at least four otherwise unrepresented countries competed for other countries in both individual and team sports. George Orton, gold medalist in 2500 metres steeplechase event and bronze medalist in 400 metres hurdles event, and Ronald J. MacDonald, both of Canada, competed for the U.S. athletics team. Orton ran for the University of Pennsylvania and was therefore assumed to be American, but he always considered himself a Canadian. Michel Théato, the winner of the marathon, competed for the French athletics team. He was a Luxembourger; however, this was only discovered decades later. Francisco Henríquez de Zubiría of Colombia was a silver medal-winner on the French tug of war team. Victor Lindberg of New Zealand was a gold medal-winner on the British water polo team. The IOC website lists all of them in the results section under the nations for which they competed and does not include their countries of nationality among the 26 participating countries.

Participating National Olympic Committees
- Argentina (1)
- Australia (2)
- Austria (13)
- Belgium (78)
- Bohemia (7)
- Cuba (1)
- Denmark (13)
- France (720) (host)
- Germany (76)
- Great Britain (102)
- Greece (3)
- Haiti (2)
- Hungary (20)
- India (1)
- Iran (1)
- Italy (24)
- Mexico (4)
- Netherlands (29)
- Norway (7)
- Peru (1)
- Romania (1)
- Russian Empire (4)
- Spain (8)
- Sweden (10)
- Switzerland (18)
- United States (75)
- Mixed team (19)

Iran was called Persia at the time.

Otherwise unrepresented countries whose athletes competed for other countries:

- Canada (2)
- Luxembourg (1)
- Colombia (1)
- New Zealand (1)

Some sources also list athletes from the following nation as having competed at these Games:

- Brazil – Adolphe Klingelhoeffer was the son of a Brazilian diplomat, and although he was born and raised in Paris, he had Brazilian citizenship in 1900, and maintained this citizenship until at least the 1940s per French athletics historian Alain Bouille. As this was discovered in late 2008, his participation is usually attributed to France.

Debuting nations at the games included Argentina, Belgium, Bohemia, Cuba, Haiti, India, Mexico, Netherlands, Norway, Persia, Peru, Romania, Russia and Spain.

Nations that participated in the previous games in Athens 1896 but were absent in Paris 1900 included Bulgaria and Chile.

Austria and Hungary competed as two sovereign countries. The polity known as Austria-Hungary is mistakenly considered a single sovereign country, while in reality was two sovereign states in real union with a single monarch who was titled both emperor of Austria and king of Hungary.

At the time, Bohemia was part of Austria, while Australia, Canada and India were all part of the British Empire.

Further to this, modern nations could be considered to have competed in some form in 1900, as Algeria, Croatia, Ireland, Poland and Slovakia had athletes compete, though these nations would not gain independence until many years later (Poland in 1918, the Irish Free State in 1922, Algeria in 1962, and Croatia and Slovakia in 1992).

Algeria sent four gymnasts who competed for France, while all of Ireland was considered a part of Great Britain: Irish athletes competed in athletics, polo, sailing and tennis. Further, a Polish fencer represented Russia, a Croatian fencer represented Austria, and two Slovak athletes competed for Hungary.

=== Number of athletes by National Olympic Committees ===
The concept of "national teams" chosen by National Olympic Committees did not exist at this point in time.

Country	Athletes
France	720
Great Britain	102
Belgium	78
United States	75
Germany	76
Netherlands	29
Italy	24
Hungary	20
Switzerland	18
Austria	13
Denmark	13
Sweden	10
Spain	8
Bohemia	7
Norway	7
Mexico	4
Russian Empire	4
Greece	3
Australia	2
Canada	2
Haiti	2
Argentina	1
Cuba	1
India	1
Iran	1
Luxembourg	1
Peru	1
Romania	1
Colombia	1
New Zealand	1
Total	1226

== Medal count ==
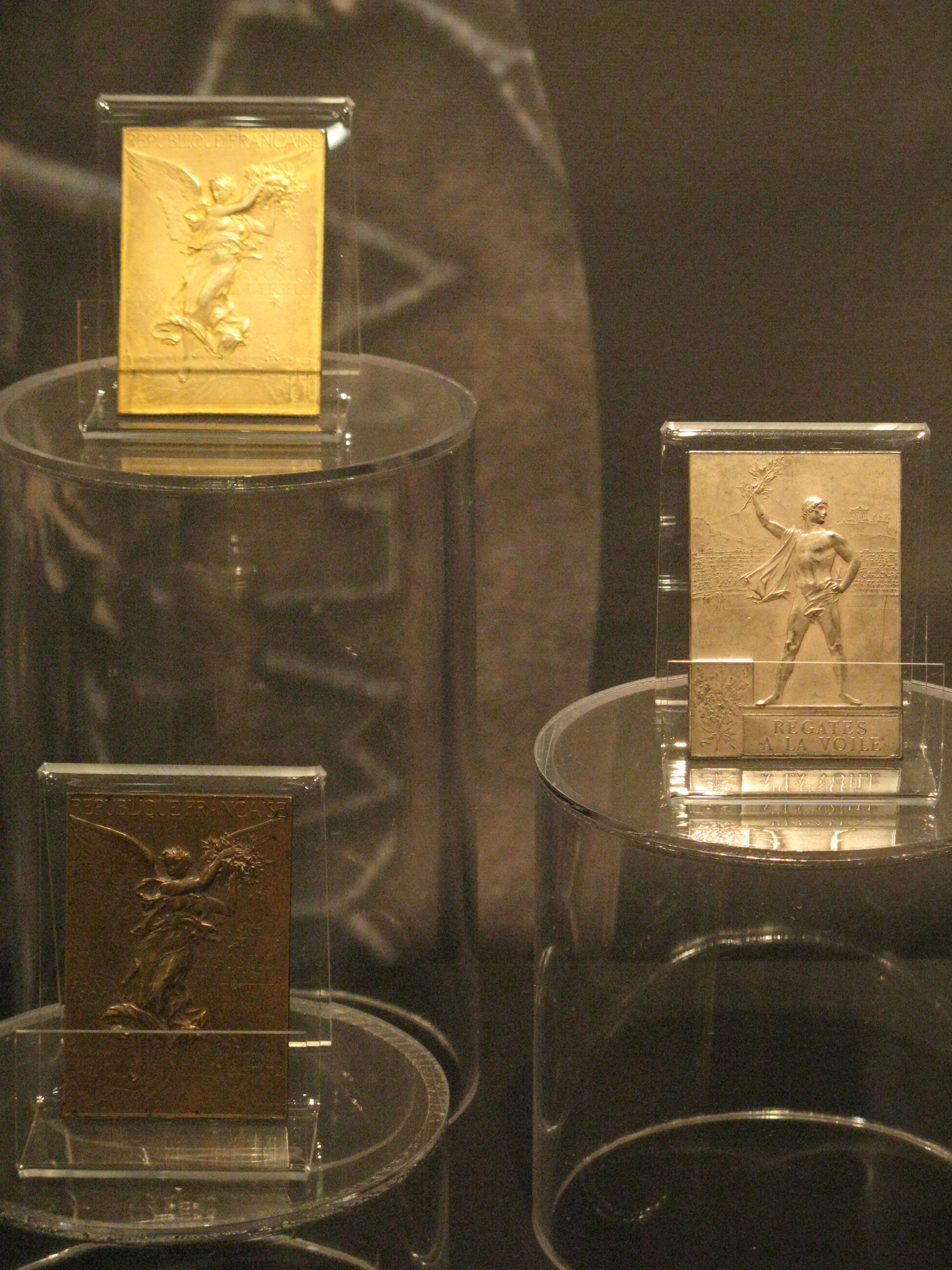
Gilt silver, silver, and bronze medals for the 1900 Olympic Games in the Olympic Museum collection

The 1900 Olympics is unique in being the only Olympic Games to feature rectangular medals, which were designed by Frédérique Vernon. Gilt silver medals were awarded for 1st place in shooting, lifesaving, automobile racing and gymnastics. Whilst 2nd place silver medals were awarded in shooting, rowing, yachting, tennis, gymnastics, sabre, fencing, equestrian and athletics. With 3rd place bronze medals being awarded in gymnastics, firefighting and shooting. In many sports, however, medals were not awarded. With most of the listed prizes were cups and other similar trophies. The International Olympic Committee has retrospectively assigned gold, silver and bronze medals to all competitors who earned 1st, 2nd and 3rd-place finishes, respectively, in order to bring early Olympics in line with current awards.

For the first Olympic Games (until Antwerp in 1920), it is difficult to give the exact number of medals awarded to some countries, due to the fact that teams were composed of athletes from different countries. For Olympic Games before 1908 there is no universally accepted definition of nationality, and medal tables may vary depending on the chosen definition. For example, Australian Stanley Rowley competed as part of a team selected by the Amateur Athletic Association of England. The concept of "national teams" chosen by National Olympic Committees did not exist at this point in time.

These are the top ten nations that won medals at the 1900 Games.

‡ Changes in medal standings (see here)

* Host nation (France)

1900 Summer Olympics medal table (Note: Figures in table reflect all official changes in medal standings.)
Rank	NOC	Gold	Silver	Bronze	Total
1	France*‡	31	41	40	112
2	United States	20	13	15	48
3	Great Britain‡	20	8	9	37
4	Belgium	6	6	6	18
5	Switzerland	6	3	1	10
6	Germany	4	3	2	9
7	Italy	3	2	0	5
8	Denmark	1	3	2	6
9	Mixed team	1	2	3	6
9	Netherlands	1	2	3	6
11–19	Remaining	3	11	13	27
Totals (19 entries)		96	94	94	284

=== Podium sweeps ===
Date	Sport	Event	NOC	Gold	Silver	Bronze
21 May	Fencing	Men's foil	France	Émile Coste	Henri Masson	Marcel Boulenger
29 May	Fencing	Men's masters foil	France	Lucien Mérignac	Alphonse Kirchhoffer	Jean-Baptiste Mimiague
31 May	Equestrian	Hacks and hunter combined	France	Louis Napoléon Murat	Victor Archenoul	Robert de Montesquiou
14 June	Fencing	Men's masters épée	France	Albert Robert Ayat	Émile Bougnol	Henri Laurent
28 June	Croquet	Singles, one ball	France	Gaston Aumoitte	Georges Johin	Chrétien Waydelich
11 July	Croquet	Singles, two balls	France	Chrétien Waydelich	Maurice Vignerot	Jacques Sautereau
11 July	Tennis	Men's singles	Great Britain	Laurence Doherty	Harold Mahony	Reginald Doherty; Arthur Norris
14 July	Athletics	Men's 110 metres hurdles	United States	Alvin Kraenzlein	John McLean (athlete)	Frederick Moloney
15 July	Athletics	Men's shot put	United States	Richard Sheldon	Josiah McCracken	Robert Garrett
16 July	Athletics	Men's 4000 metres steeplechase	Great Britain	John Rimmer	Charles Bennett	Sidney Robinson
16 July	Athletics	Men's triple jump	United States	Myer Prinstein	James Brendan Connolly	Lewis Sheldon
16 July	Athletics	Men's standing high jump	United States	Ray Ewry	Irving Baxter	Lewis Sheldon
16 July	Athletics	Men's standing triple jump	United States	Ray Ewry	Irving Baxter	Robert Garrett
16 July	Athletics	Men's hammer throw	United States	John Flanagan	Truxtun Hare	Josiah McCracken
30 July	Gymnastics	Men's all around	France	Gustave Sandras	Noël Bas	Lucien Démanet
4 August	Shooting	Men's 20 metre rapid fire pistol	France	Maurice Larrouy	Léon Moreaux	Eugène Balme
14 August	Archery	Au Chapelet 50 metres	France	Eugène Mougin	Henri Helle	Émile Mercier
24 August	Sailing	0 to .5 ton	France	Pierre Gervais; Émile Sacré	François Texier; Auguste Texier; Robert Linzeler; Jean-Baptiste Charcot	Henri Monnot; Léon Tellier; Gaston Cailleux; Pierre Gervais

== See also ==
- Olympic Games held in France
  - 1900 Summer Olympics – Paris
  - 1924 Summer Olympics – Paris
  - 1924 Winter Olympics – Chamonix
  - 1968 Winter Olympics – Grenoble
  - 1992 Winter Olympics – Albertville
  - 2024 Summer Olympics – Paris
  - 2030 Winter Olympics – French Alps
- List of IOC country codes

== Notes ==
- ^{a} ^{b} ^{c} ^{d} ^{e} ^{f} At an earlier time the IOC database for the 1900 Summer Olympics listed 85 medal events, 24 participating countries and 997 athletes (22 women, 975 men). The Olympic historian and author, Bill Mallon, whose studies have shed light on the topic, suggested the number 95 events satisfying all four retrospective selection criteria (restricted to amateurs, international participation, open to all competitors and without handicapping) and now should be considered as Olympic events. In July 2021, the IOC upgraded its complete online database of all Olympic results explicitly to incorporate the data of the Olympic historians website, Olympedia.org, thus accepting Mallon's recommendation (based on four applied criteria) for events of the 1900 Olympic Games. The eleven events, the results of which had nevertheless been shown within the earlier IOC database, had been added over the former total of 85. Оne shooting event (20 metre military pistol, which was an event for professionals) had been removed. Acceptance of Mallon's recommendation increased the number of events to 95, and also entailed increasing the number of participation countries up to 26 and athletes up to 1,226. The IOC webpage for the 1900 Summer Olympics shows a total of 95 medal events, 26 participating countries and 1,226 athletes. The IOC factsheet "The Games of the Olympiad" updated in November 2025 said there were 95 events, but was still referring to old numbers of participating countries (24) and athletes (997).

Summer Olympics
Preceded by Athens	II Olympiad; Paris; 1900	Succeeded by St. Louis
