= Daniel Mérillon =

French sports shooter (1852–1925)

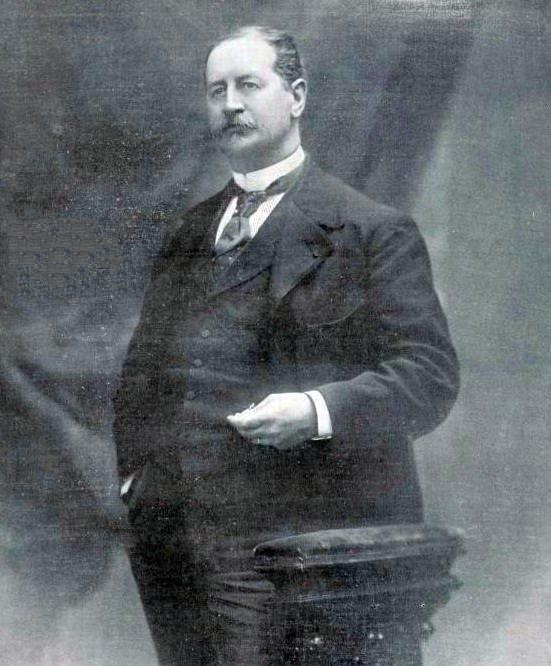
- Mérillon in 1900

Personal information
- Born: 29 June 1852 Bordeaux, France
- Died: 23 August 1925 (aged 73) Dordogne, France

Sport
- Sport: Sports shooting

Daniel Mérillon (29 June 1852 – 23 August 1925) was a French sports shooter. He competed at the 1908 and 1912 Summer Olympics.

Mérillon was the president of the French Shooting Federation and the director-general of the overall sporting program at the Exposition Universelle, which encompassed the 1900 Summer Olympics.
