= Pigeon racing at the 1900 Summer Olympics =

Pigeon racing at the Games of the II Olympiad
- Competitors: from 1 nation
- Teams: 47

At the 1900 Summer Olympics in Paris, six pigeon racing events were contested. These events have generally not been classified as official, although the IOC has never decided which events were "Olympic" and which were not.

== Event ==
The report on the "International Contests of Physical Exercise and of Sports" in Paris in 1900 lists lâcher-concours de pigeons-voyageurs (lit. 'homing pigeon release competition', in French) occurring on 6 separate sundays: 24 June, 8 July, 29 July, 26 August, 9 September and 16 September 1900, all in the French commune of Vincennes. The pigeons were originally planned to be released at 10:00 each day, but, as a Dr. Conil reports, actual release times varied depending on the distance pigeons had to cover and the direction of the wind. Due to additional restrictions, such as not having pigeons flying in opposite directions at the same time, there were "almost as many releases" as there were competing companies, which "could only be of interest to people initiated in our sport", hence the relatively low attendance.

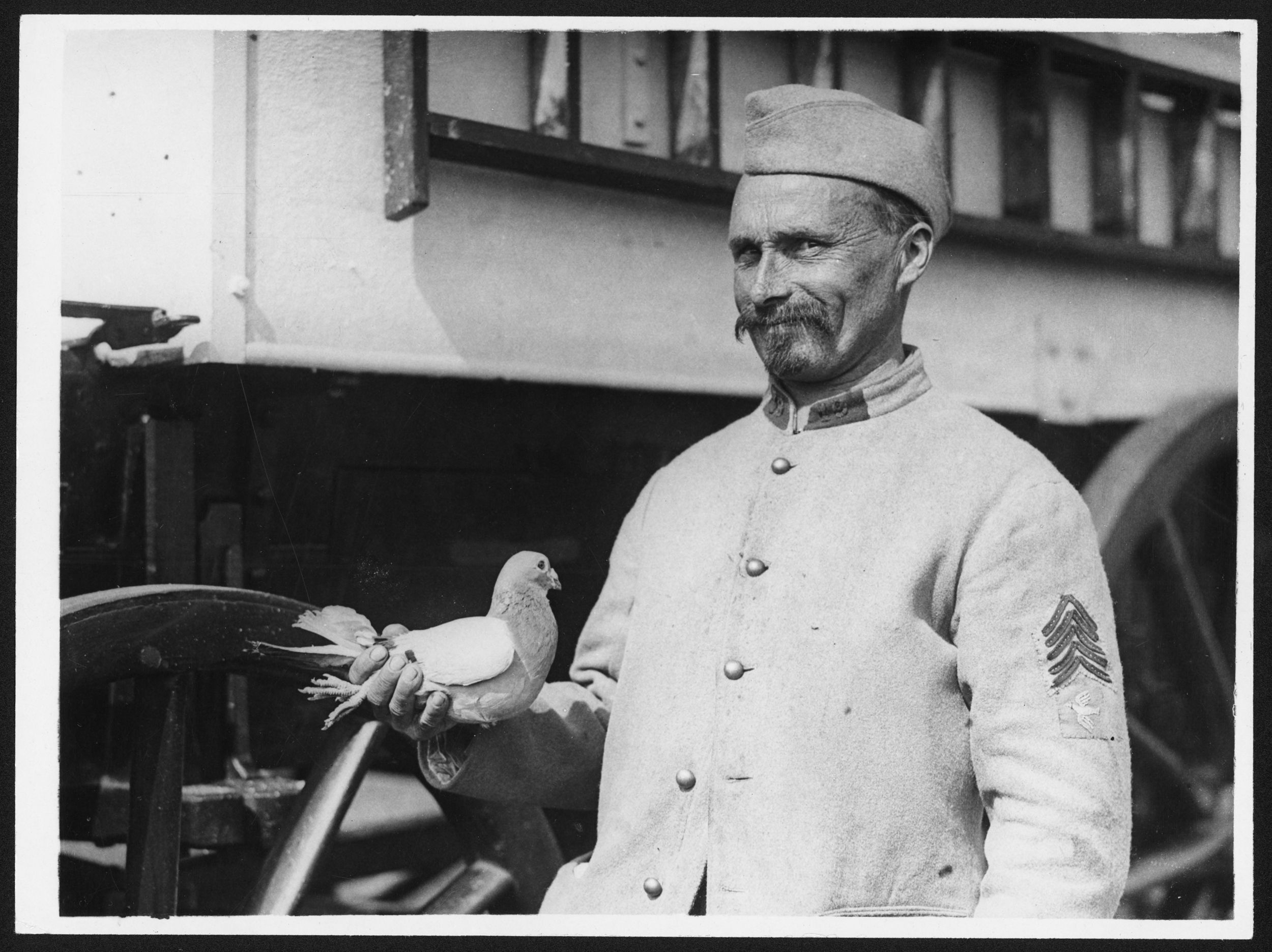
A French homing pigeon and its trainer

Some dates also included a lâcher-spectacle de pigeons-voyageurs (lit. 'homing pigeon release spectacle'), events where pigeons were released simultaneously, in the thousands, just for an audience's viewing pleasure. This was due to conflicting needs when planning the competitions: pigeon races are only successful "at an early hour", Dr. Conil writes, while the majority of the public only attends events in the afternoon. Thus, the pigeon release spectacles were added to give the public something to watch that was related to the competitions, while the races themselves were done earlier in the day.

A subcommittee of colombophiles was in charge of preparing "the complete project for racing pigeon competitions". The Fédération Colombophile de la Seine was chosen to be responsible for the competitions.

The competition was restricted to French companies established at least 80 kilometres (50 mi) away from Paris. Those interested in participating had to commit to sending at least 100 pigeons, which had to arrive by the day before the competition.

== Results ==
In total, there were 47 competing companies, totaling 7,721 pigeons. (Note: Though the source originally states there were 48 companies, the later table only lists 47 companies with pigeon counts adding up to 7,721, indicating 48 was likely a miscount.) The competitions had a total prize pool of 7,300 francs, reduced to 6,254 after operational costs. This was split and awarded to every participating company, paid on a per pigeon basis at a rounded up value of 0.81 franc each. As such, no "winner" was picked and rewarded separately; the event instead had an emphasis on patriotism and verifying whether pigeons from different regions of France could be used for war.

Results of the Pigeon Races of 24 June 1900 (Note: Reportedly under strong westward wind.)
Company	Origin	Number of pigeons	Times		Duration
Company	Origin	Number of pigeons	Release	Return	Duration
Fédération	Agen	100	8:00	18:23	10h 23min
Fédération	Bordeaux	103	8:03	17:29	9h 26min
Pigeons messagers	Rive-de-Gier	125	8:05	15:00	6h 55min
La Courageuse	La Grand-Croix	135	9:00	16:03	7h 3min
Cercle colombophile	Saint-Étienne	245	9:00	15:53	6h 53min
La Colombe	La Talaudière	100	9:00	15:32	6h 32min
Messager rochefortais	Rochefort-sur-Mer	125	9:03	17:19	8h 16min
La Rochefortaise	Rochefort-sur-Mer	100	9:03	17:20	8h 17min
Messager de la patrie	Niort	100	9:03	15:58	6h 55min
Colombe vannelaise	Vannes	138	9:05	18:58	9h 53min
Espérance des courriers limousins	Limoges	222	9:07	15:27	6h 20min
Abeille	Rennes	250	10:00	16:02	6h 2min
Messager angevin	Angers	208	10:02	16:23	6h 21min
Messager coutançais	Coutances	116	10:04	15:31	5h 27min
La Domfrontaise	Domfront, Orne	142	10:04	14:35	4h 31min
L'Avenir	Rosendaël	118	10:06	13:30	3h 24min
Total: 16 companies, 2,327 pigeons

Results of the Pigeon Races of 8 July 1900 (Note: Reportedly under north-westward wind.)
Company	Origin	Number of pigeons	Times		Duration
Company	Origin	Number of pigeons	Release	Return	Duration
Le Rapide	Saint-Chamond	120	8:03	12:39	4h 36min
Estafette lyonnaise	Lyon	101	9:00	13:29	4h 29min
Hirondelle	Lyon	140	9:00	13:29	4h 29min
Messagère	Calais	183	10:00	14:58	4h 58min
Colombophile	Saint-Venant	120	10:00	14:00	4h
Orléanaise	Orléans	100	10:05	11:25	1h 20min
Espérance de Landelle	Charleval	100	10:10	12:20	2h 10min
Fédération	Anzin	386	10:15	13:46	3h 31min
Total: 8 companies, 1,250 pigeons

Results of the Pigeon Races of 29 July 1900
Company	Origin	Number of pigeons	Times		Duration
Company	Origin	Number of pigeons	Release	Return	Duration
Éclair	Talmont	125	9:45	18:21	8h 36min
Messager de l'Océan	Les Sables-d'Olonne	112	9:45	19:46	10h 1min
Union colombophile	La Roche-sur-Yon	152	9:45	18:17	8h 32min
Union colombophile	Roanne	103	10:00	16:55	6h 55min
Messager roannais	Roanne	125	10:00	19:01	9h 1min
Union	Loudun	100	13:20	18:20	5h
Voltigeurs de L'Aâ	Saint-Omer	100	13:25	18:46	5h 21min
Colombophile	Le Mans	130	13:35	17:05	3h 30min
Courriers nogentais	Nogent-le-Rotrou	135	13:35	15:42	2h 7min
Fédération	Reims	515	13:50	16:51	3h 1min
Colombe ébroïcienne	Évreux	150	13:55	15:42	1h 47min
Total: 11 companies, 1,747 pigeons

Results of the Pigeon Races of 26 August 1900 (Note: Reportedly under south-westward wind.)
Company	Origin	Number of pigeons	Times		Duration
Company	Origin	Number of pigeons	Release	Return	Duration
Ramier dauphinois	Rives	100	7:30	17:15	9h 45min
Messager niortais	Niort	100	9:00	14:30	5h 30min
Éclaireurs	Nancy	100	9:50	15:10	5h 20min
Expresse	Calais	54	10:00	14:44	4h 44min
Fraternelle	Boulogne-sur-Mer	166	10:00	13:45	3h 45min
Colombe patriote	Le Havre	100	10:05	12:31	2h 26min
Ramier	Amiens	174	10:10	12:29	2h 19min
Pigeon messager	Épernay	170	10:20	12:40	2h 20min
Vedette	Mourmelon	120	10:20	13:37	3h 17min
Total: 9 companies, 1,084 pigeons

Results of the Pigeon Races of 9 September 1900
Company	Origin	Number of pigeons	Times		Duration
Company	Origin	Number of pigeons	Release	Return	Duration
La Messagère	Mouzon	126	10:00	13:43	3h 43min
Total: 1 company, 126 pigeons

Results of the Pigeon Races of 16 September 1900 (Note: Reportedly under light eastward wind.)
Company	Origin	Number of pigeons	Times		Duration
Company	Origin	Number of pigeons	Release	Return	Duration
Union	Roubaix	252	10:00	12:44	2h 44min
Fédération	Rouen	935	10:10	11:39	1h 29min
Total: 2 companies, 1,187 pigeons

== See also ==
- Pigeon shooting at the Olympics

== Bibliography ==
- Mérillon, M. D., ed. (1901). "Concours Internationaux d'Exercices Physiques et de Sports: Rapports" [International Contests of Physical Exercise and of Sports: Reports]. Olympic World Library (in French).
