= Ballooning at the 1900 Summer Olympics =

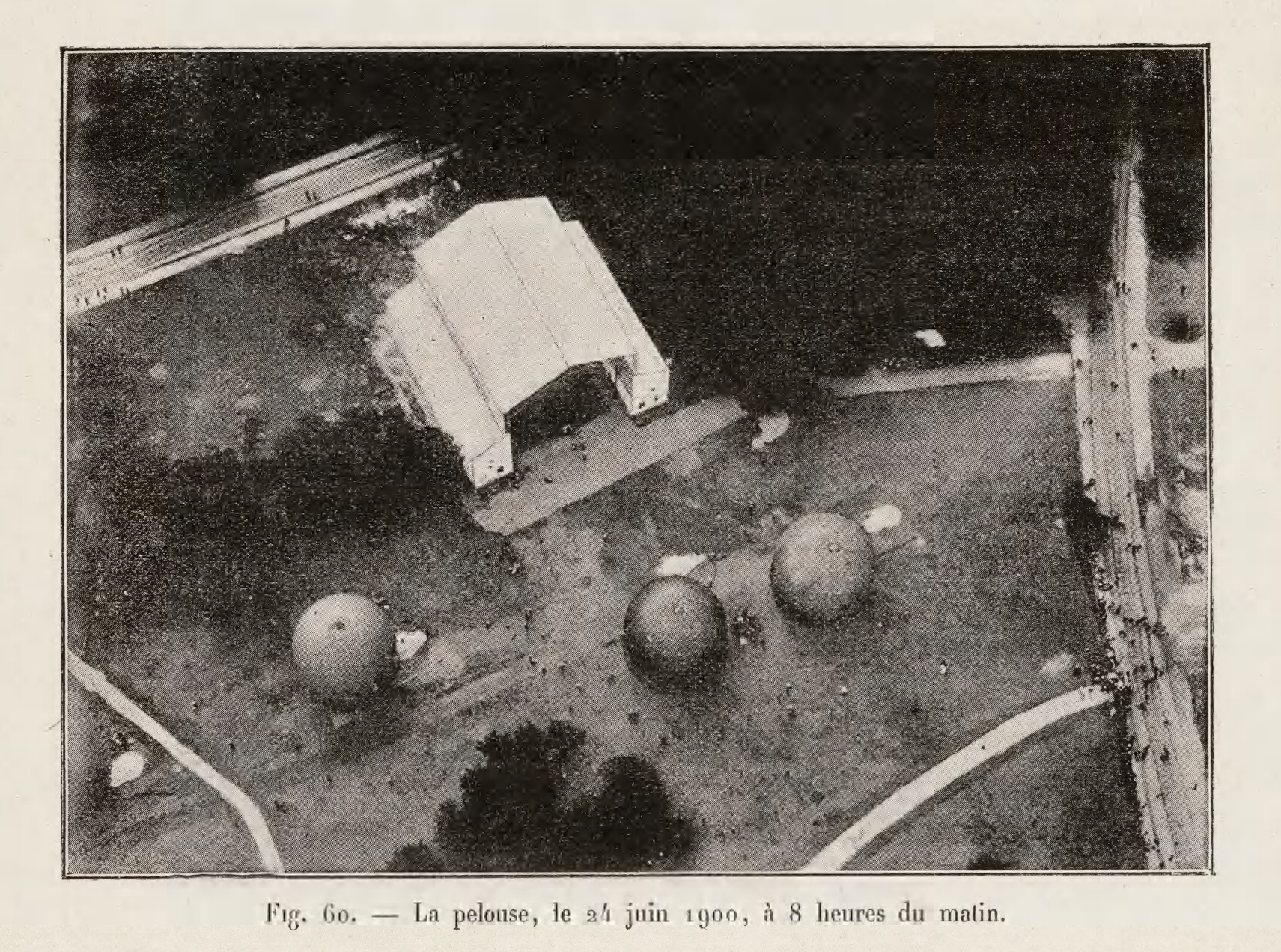
Aerial view of the 1900 Olympic ballooning venue at Le Parc d'aerostation, Paris

Ballooning, using gas balloons (which require no power, fuel or motors), was on the Summer Olympic Games programme in 1900. The aeronautical pioneer Henry de La Vaulx set two world records for distance and duration piloting a balloon flight.

Nearly all events at the 1900 Games that satisfied four retrospective selection criteria — restricted to amateurs, open to all nations, open to all competitors and without handicapping — are now regarded as Olympic events. Although the ballooning events listed below met these criteria, they have generally not been classified as official.

== Ballooning in 1900 ==
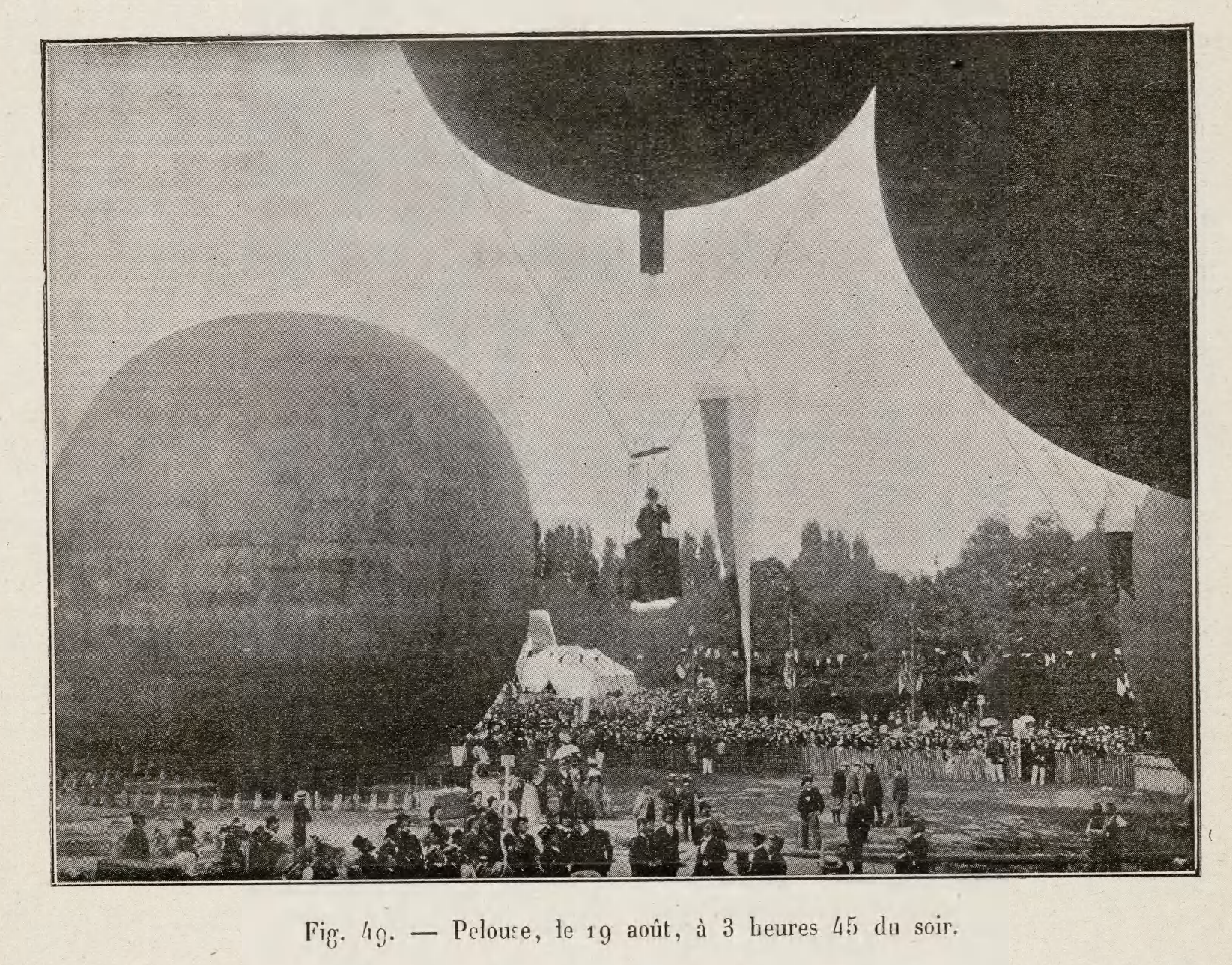
1900 Olympic ballooning event at Le Parc d'aerostation, Paris

Hot air balloons for manned flight were invented in 1783, but requiring fuel, they proved less practical than the hydrogen balloons that followed almost immediately. Hot air ballooning soon died out, and gas balloons dominated ballooning for nearly 200 years. Gas balloons used hydrogen or coal gas until switching to helium well into the 20th century.

The height or altitude of a gas balloon is controlled with ballast weights that can be dropped if the balloon gets too low. In order to land some lifting gas must be vented through a valve. Gas balloons have greater lift for a given volume, so they do not need to be so large, and they can also stay up for much longer than hot air balloons.

== Results ==
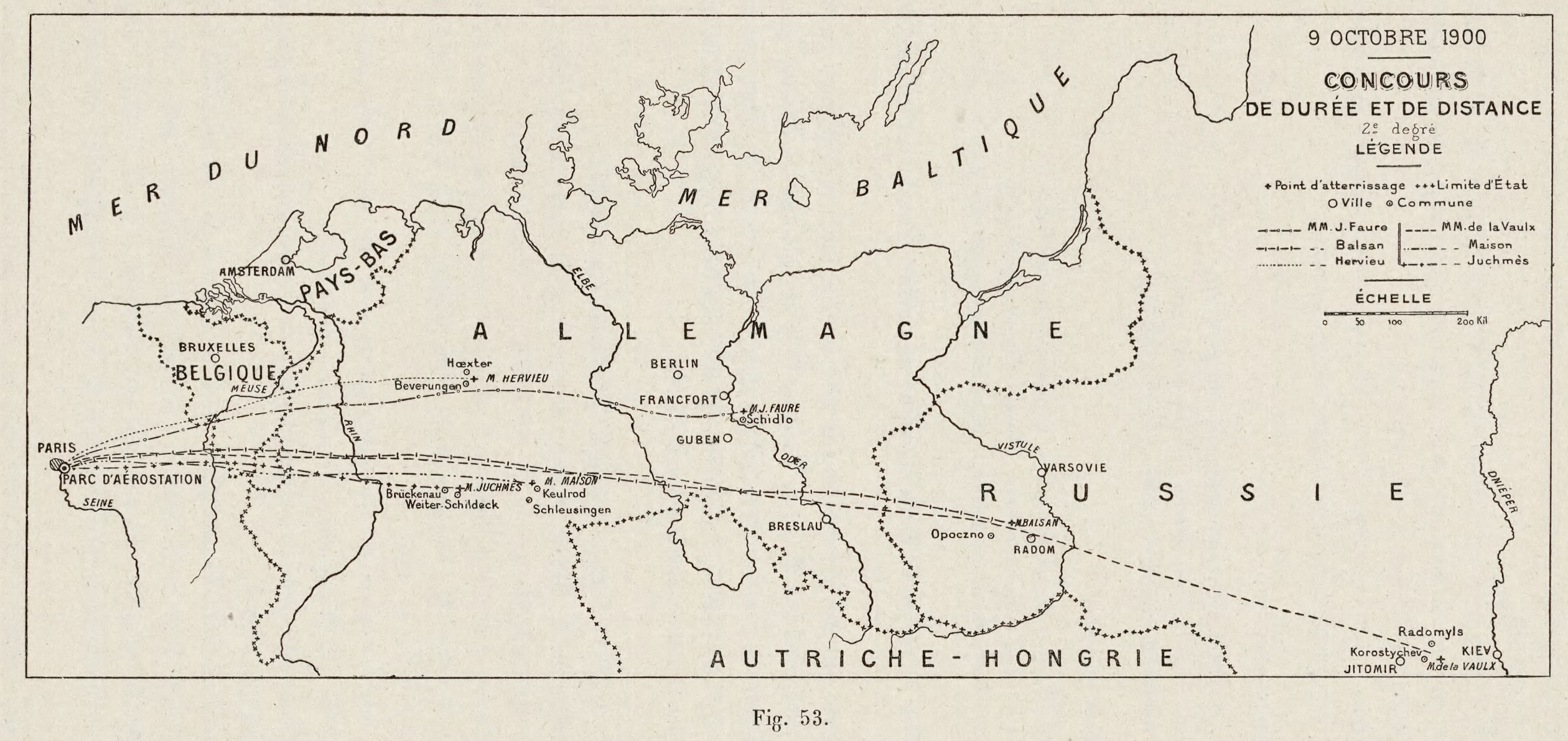
Map of flights in the race for overall duration and distance (9 October 1900). The team of Henry de la Vaulx and Georges Castillon de Saint-Victor set world records for distance (1925 km, Paris to Kyiv) and duration (nearly 36 hours).

First three pilots in each event (excluding handicapped events) were as follows (teammate in parentheses, where known):

Distance: Comte Henry de La Vaulx FRA 1237 km, Jacques Balsan FRA 1222 km, Jacques Faure FRA 1183 km

Duration: Jacques Balsan FRA 35:09, Comte de Castillon de Saint-Victor FRA 18:00, G. Hervieu FRA 17:51

Elevation: Jacques Balsan FRA 8417 m, Georges Juchmès FRA 6867 m, Comte Henry de la Vaulx FRA 6820 m

Target without Stop: Comte Henri de la Valette FRA 800 m, L. Cruciere FRA 2000 m, E. Lassagne FRA 2100 m

Target with Stop Total: Jacques Faure FRA 16,400 m, E. Godard FRA 21,200 m, Comte Henry de la Vaulx FRA 24,000 m

Part I: Jacques Faure FRA 7600 m, Comte Henry de la Vaulx FRA 9500 m, ?. Pietri FRA 9700 m
Part II: Jacques Faure FRA 8800 m, E. Godard FRA 11,200 m, Comte Henri de la Valette FRA 13,600 m

Distance and Duration Overall: Comte Henry de la Vaulx (and Georges Castillon de Saint-Victor), FRA 5080 pts, Jacques Balsan FRA 4360 pts, Jacques Faure FRA 2910 pts

Distance: Comte Henry de la Vaulx (and Georges Castillon de Saint-Victor), FRA 1925 km (World record), Jacques Balsan FRA 1345 km, Jacques Faure FRA 950 km
Duration: Comte Henry de la Vaulx (and Georges Castillon de Saint-Victor), FRA 35:45 (World record), Jacques Balsan FRA 27:05, Jacques Faure FRA 19:24
