= Fencing at the 1900 Summer Olympics – Men's épée =

Men's épée at the Games of the II Olympiad
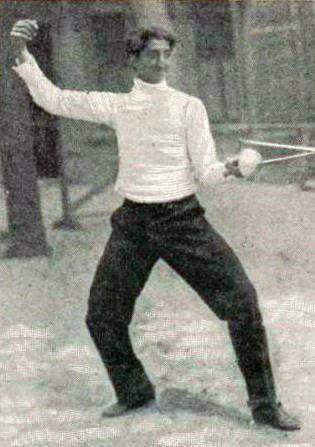
- Gold medalist Ramón Fonst
- Venue: Tuileries Garden
- Dates: 1–14 June
- Competitors: 102 from 11 nations

Medalists
1st place, gold medalist(s)		Ramón Fonst; Cuba
2nd place, silver medalist(s)		Louis Perrée; France
3rd place, bronze medalist(s)		Léon Sée; France

The épée event for amateurs was one of three épée events at the 1900 Summer Olympics. 102 fencers from 11 nations competed, with 91 of them from France. The event was won by Ramón Fonst of Cuba, the first of his two golds in individual épée. Silver and bronze both went to host nation fencers, Louis Perrée and Léon Sée. These badly organized games — derisively called “The Farcical Games” — were so poorly publicized that years later, even the competitors were clueless that they had competed in the Olympics in 1900. No official records for the games exist. These accomplishments are not even mentioned in the 1911 Encyclopædia Britannica. This was the first appearance of the event, as only foil and sabre events had been held at the first Games in 1896; the Men's épée event has been held at every Summer Olympics since 1900.

== Competition format ==
The event used a four-round format: round 1, quarterfinals, semifinals, and a final. Each round consisted of pool play. For round 1, the fencers were divided into 17 pools of 6 or 7 fencers each; the top two fencers in each pool advanced to the quarterfinals. The quarterfinals were intended to divide the 34 fencers into 6 pools of 5 or 6 fencers each; after 3 men withdrew, the round consisted of 5 pools of 6 fencers plus a special pool of the last remaining fencer plus 4 of the losers from the first 5 pools. The top 3 fencers in each pool advanced to the semifinals. The semifinals had the 18 men compete in 3 pools of 6, with the top 3 in each pool advancing to a 9-man final.

The actual competition format within pools is not entirely clear. Only results from the final are known. In the final, each fencer had 5 or 6 bouts (rather than 8, which would be the number if a full round-robin were held). The top places were determined by number of wins, with a barrage held when two fencers finished with 4 wins (though one had only 1 loss while the other had 2).

== Schedule ==
Date	Time	Round
Friday, 1 June 1900		Round 1 pools A–D
2–5 June 1900		Round 1 pools E–L
Wednesday, 6 June 1900		Round 1 pools M–Q
7–9 June 1900	9:00	Quarterfinals
Sunday, 10 June 1900		Semifinals
Wednesday, 13 June 1900		Final
Thursday, 14 June 1900		Final, continued

== Results ==
=== Round 1 ===
The first round of the event consisted of pool play round-robin tournaments. Each fencer faced each other fencer once. Of the 17 pools, 15 had six fencers each and 2 had seven. The top two placers in each advanced to the quarterfinals.

==== Pool A ====
Rank	Fencer	Nation	Notes
1	Joseph-Marie Rosé	France	Q
2	Élie, Count de Lastours	France	Q
3–6	H. Georges Berger	France	
3–6	Luquetas	France	
3–6	Mosso	France	
3–6	André Tintant	France	/

==== Pool B ====
Rank	Fencer	Nation	Notes
1	Jules de Pradel	France	Q
2	Jean Dreyfus	France	Q
3–6	Jacques de la Chevalerie	France	
3–6	Gardiès	France	
3–6	Hérrison	France	
3–6	Ivan Ivanovitch	France	

==== Pool C ====
Rank	Fencer	Nation	Notes
1	Jules Roffe	France	Q
2	Édouard Fouchier	France	Q
3–6	Pierre Georges Louis d'Hugues	France	
3–6	Moreil	France	
3–6	Max Rodrigues	France	
3–6	Véve	France	

==== Pool D ====
Rank	Fencer	Nation	Notes
1	Ramón Fonst	Cuba	Q
2	Edmond Wallace	France	Q
3	Willy Sulzbacher	France	
4–6	Bazin	France	
4–6	Maurice Fleury	France	
4–6	Pierre Thomegeux	France	

==== Pool E ====
Rank	Fencer	Nation	Notes
1	Gaston Alibert	France	Q
2	Georges de la Falaise	France	Q
3–6	Olivier Collarini	Italy	
3–6	Grad	France	
3–6	Massé	France	
3–6	Achille Morin	France	

==== Pool F ====
Rank	Fencer	Nation	Notes
1	Jean-Joseph Renaud	France	Q
2	Maurice Boisdon	France	Q
3–6	Laurent de Champeaux	France	
3–6	Charles Loizillon	France	
3–6	Salvanahac	France	
3–6	de Segonzac	France	

==== Pool G ====
Rank	Fencer	Nation	Notes
1	Henri Plommet	France	Q
2	Léon Thiébaut	France	Q
3	Lariviére	France	
4–6	Adam	France	
4–6	Robert Marc	France	
4–6	Jean Taillefer	France	

==== Pool H ====
Rank	Fencer	Nation	Notes
1	André-Marie Rabel	France	Q
2	Josiah Bowden	Great Britain	Q
3–6	de Lastic	France	
3–6	Georges Leroy	France	
3–6	Miller	France	
3–6	Ivan, Viscount d'Oyley	United States	

==== Pool I ====
Rank	Fencer	Nation	Notes
1	Richard Wallace	France	Q
2	Freydoun Malkom	Iran	Q
3–6	Marie Joseph Anatole Elie	France	
3–6	de Laugardière	France	
3–6	Georges Redeuil	France	
3–6	Joseph Sénat	France	

==== Pool J ====
Rank	Fencer	Nation	Notes
1	Marcel Lévy	France	Q
2	Maurice Jay	France	Q
3–6	Henri de Laborde	France	
3–6	Adjutant Lemoine	France	
3–6	Charles Robinson	Great Britain	
3–6	André de Romilly	France	

==== Pool K ====
Rank	Fencer	Nation	Notes
1	Giuseppe Giurato	Italy	Q
2	Raoul Bideau	France	Q
3–6	Clément de Boissière	France	
3–6	Albert Cahen	France	
3–6	Fernandès	France	
3–6	de la Tournable	France	

==== Pool L ====
Rank	Fencer	Nation	Notes
1	Alexandre Guillemand	France	Q
2	Jacques Holzschuch	France	Q
3	Ducreuil	France	
4–6	Andreac	France	
4–6	Costiesco	France	
4–6	Paul Robert	Switzerland	

==== Pool M ====
Rank	Fencer	Nation	Notes
1	Léon Sée	France	Q
2	Eduardo Camet	Argentina	Q
3–6	Carlos de Candamo	Peru	
3–6	Mauricio, 4th Duke of Gor	Spain	
3–6	de Meuse	France	
3–6	Joseph Rodrigues	France	

==== Pool N ====
Rank	Fencer	Nation	Notes
1	Henri Hébrard de Villeneuve	France	Q
2	Alphonse Moquet	France	Q
3–7	de Cazenove	France	
3–7	René Jules Thion de la Chaume	France	
3–7	de Pradines	France	
3–7	Prosper	France	
3–7	Pierre Rosenbaum	France	

==== Pool O ====
Rank	Fencer	Nation	Notes
1	Louis Perrée	France	Q
2	Henri-Georges Berger	France	Q
3–6	Louis Bastien	France	
3–6	Stan François	France	
3–6	Peberay	France	
3–6	Preurot	France	

==== Pool P ====
Rank	Fencer	Nation	Notes
1	Tony Smet	Belgium	Q
2	Henri Jean Début	France	Q
3–7	Gaston Achille	France	
3–7	Duclos	France	
3–7	Giunio Fedreghini	Italy	
3–7	Fichot	France	
3–7	Weber	France	

==== Pool Q ====
Rank	Fencer	Nation	Notes
1	Adrien Guyon	France	Q
2	Jean-André Hilleret	France	Q
3–6	Delprat	France	
3–6	Lafontaine	France	
3–6	Adolphe Thomegeux	France	
3–6	de Vars	France	

=== Quarterfinals ===
The quarterfinals were again round-robin affairs. The original schedule was that there would be six pools: two would have five fencers each and four would have six fencers, with the top three in each pool to advance.

After three of the original quarterfinalists (Maurice Jay, André Rabel, and Jean-Joseph Renaud) withdrew after the draw, the quarterfinals were redrawn: there were five pools with six fencers each, while the sixth pool included Holzschuch and four fencers who had lost in other quarterfinals and were given a second chance to advance.

==== Quarterfinal A ====
Rank	Fencer	Nation	Notes
1	Jean Dreyfuss	France	Q
2	Henri Plommet	France	Q
3	Marcel Lévy	France	Q
4–6	Jean-André Hilleret	France	
4–6	Alphonse Moquet	France	
4–6	Jules Roffe	France	

==== Quarterfinal B ====
Rank	Fencer	Nation	Notes
1	Richard Wallace	France	Q
2	Élie, Count de Lastours	France	Q
3	Georges de la Falaise	France	Q
4–6	Josiah Bowden	Great Britain	
4–6	Alexandre Guillemand	France	
4–6	Léon Thiébaut	France	

==== Quarterfinal C ====
Rank	Fencer	Nation	Notes
1	Edmond Wallace	France	Q
2	Eduardo Camet	Argentina	Q
3	Jules de Pradel	France	Q
4–6	Raoul Bideau	France	
4–6	Tony Smet	Belgium	
4–6	Henri Hébrard de Villeneuve	France	

==== Quarterfinal D ====
Rank	Fencer	Nation	Notes
1	Gaston Alibert	France	Q
2	Léon Sée	France	Q
3	Ramón Fonst	Cuba	Q
4–6	Henri-Georges Berger	France	
4–6	Giuseppe Giurato	Italy	
4–6	Freydoun Malkom	Iran	

==== Quarterfinal E ====
Rank	Fencer	Nation	Notes
1	Maurice Boisdon	France	Q
2	Louis Perrée	France	Q
3	Joseph-Marie Rosé	France	Q
4–6	Henri Jean Début	France	
4–6	Édouard Fouchier	France	
4–6	Adrien Guyon	France	

==== Quarterfinal F ====
Rank	Fencer	Nation	Notes
1	Jacques Holzschuch	France	Q
2	Léon Thiébaut	France	Q
3	Alexandre Guillemand	France	Q
4–5	Unknown		

=== Semifinals ===
The semifinals, with 18 fencers left, were conducted in three pools of round-robin play. Each pool had six fencers, with the top three advancing to the final.

==== Semifinal A ====
Rank	Fencer	Nation	Notes
1	Gaston Alibert	France	Q
2	Henri Plommet	France	Q
3	Léon Sée	France	Q
4–6	Élie, Count de Lastours	France	
4–6	Jacques Holzschuch	France	
4–6	Joseph-Marie Rosé	France	

==== Semifinal B ====
Rank	Fencer	Nation	Notes
1	Georges de la Falaise	France	Q
2	Louis Perrée	France	Q
3	Eduardo Camet	Argentina	Q
4–6	Maurice Boisdon	France	
4–6	Jean Dreyfuss	France	
4–6	Jules de Pradel	France	

==== Semifinal C ====
Rank	Fencer	Nation	Notes
1	Léon Thiébaut	France	Q
2	Edmond Wallace	France	Q
3	Ramón Fonst	Cuba	Q
4–6	Alexandre Guillemand	France	
4–6	Marcel Lévy	France	
4–6	Richard Wallace	France	

=== Final ===
In the final, each fencer had either 5 or 6 bouts. Fonst and Perrée initially tied for first with 4 wins each, then Fonst won the barrage to break the tie.

Rank	Fencer	Nation	Wins	Losses
1st place, gold medalist(s)	Ramón Fonst	Cuba	4	2
2nd place, silver medalist(s)	Louis Perrée	France	4	1
3rd place, bronze medalist(s)	Léon Sée	France	3	2
4	Georges de la Falaise	France	3	3
5	Eduardo Camet	Argentina	2	3
6	Edmond Wallace	France	2	4
7	Gaston Alibert	France	2	3
8	Léon Thiébaut	France	2	4
9	Henri Plommet	France	0	6

== Results summary ==
Rank	Fencer	Nation	Round 1 Rank	Quarterfinals Rank	Semifinals Rank	Final Wins	Final Losses
1st place, gold medalist(s)	Ramón Fonst	Cuba	1st	3rd	3rd	4	2
2nd place, silver medalist(s)	Louis Perrée	France	1st	2nd	2nd	4	1
3rd place, bronze medalist(s)	Léon Sée	France	1st	2nd	3rd	3	2
4	Georges de la Falaise	France	2nd	3rd	1st	3	3
5	Eduardo Camet	Argentina	2nd	2nd	3rd	2	3
6	Edmond Wallace	France	2nd	1st	2nd	2	4
7	Gaston Alibert	France	1st	1st	1st	2	3
8	Léon Thiébaut	France	2nd	2nd	1st	2	4
9	Henri Plommet	France	1st	2nd	2nd	0	6
10–18	Maurice Boisdon	France	2nd	1st	4th–6th	Did not advance	
10–18	Jean Dreyfuss	France	2nd	1st	4th–6th	Did not advance	
10–18	Alexandre Guillemand	France	1st	3rd	4th–6th	Did not advance	
10–18	Jacques Holzschuch	France	2nd	1st	4th–6th	Did not advance	
10–18	Élie, Count de Lastours	France	2nd	2nd	4th–6th	Did not advance	
10–18	Marcel Lévy	France	1st	3rd	4th–6th	Did not advance	
10–18	Jules de Pradel	France	1st	3rd	4th–6th	Did not advance	
10–18	Joseph-Marie Rosé	France	1st	3rd	4th–6th	Did not advance	
10–18	Richard Wallace	France	1st	1st	4th–6th	Did not advance	
19–31	Henri-Georges Berger	France	2nd	4th–6th	Did not advance		
19–31	Raoul Bideau	France	2nd	4th–6th	Did not advance		
19–31	Josiah Bowden	Great Britain	2nd	4th–6th	Did not advance		
19–31	Henri Jean Début	France	2nd	4th–6th	Did not advance		
19–31	Édouard Fouchier	France	2nd	4th–6th	Did not advance		
19–31	Giuseppe Giurato	Italy	1st	4th–6th	Did not advance		
19–31	Adrien Guyon	France	1st	4th–6th	Did not advance		
19–31	Jean-André Hilleret	France	2nd	4th–6th	Did not advance		
19–31	Freydoun Malkom	Iran	2nd	4th–6th	Did not advance		
19–31	Alphonse Moquet	France	2nd	4th–6th	Did not advance		
19–31	Jules Roffe	France	1st	4th–6th	Did not advance		
19–31	Tony Smet	Belgium	1st	4th–6th	Did not advance		
19–31	Henri Hébrard de Villeneuve	France	1st	4th–6th	Did not advance		
32	Maurice Jay	France	2nd	DNS	Did not advance		
32	André Rabel	France	1st	DNS	Did not advance		
32	Jean-Joseph Renaud	France	1st	DNS	Did not advance		
35–104	Gaston Achille	France	3rd–7th	Did not advance			
35–104	Adam	France	4th–6th	Did not advance			
35–104	Andreac	France	4th–6th	Did not advance			
35–104	Louis Bastien	France	3rd–6th	Did not advance			
35–104	Bazin	France	4th–6th	Did not advance			
35–104	H. Georges Berger	France	3rd–6th	Did not advance			
35–104	Clément de Boissière	France	3rd–6th	Did not advance			
35–104	Albert Cahen	France	3rd–6th	Did not advance			
35–104	Carlos de Candamo	Peru	3rd–6th	Did not advance			
35–104	de Cazenove	France	3rd–7th	Did not advance			
35–104	Laurent de Champeaux	France	3rd–6th	Did not advance			
35–104	René Jules Thion de la Chaume	France	3rd–7th	Did not advance			
35–104	Jacques de la Chevalerie	France	3rd–6th	Did not advance			
35–104	Olivier Collarini	Italy	3rd–6th	Did not advance			
35–104	Costiesco	France	4th–6th	Did not advance			
35–104	Delprat	France	3rd–6th	Did not advance			
35–104	Duclos	France	3rd–7th	Did not advance			
35–104	Ducreuil	France	3rd	Did not advance			
35–104	Marie Joseph Anatole Elie	France	3rd–6th	Did not advance			
35–104	Giunio Fedreghini	Italy	3rd–7th	Did not advance			
35–104	Fernandès	France	3rd–6th	Did not advance			
35–104	Fichot	France	3rd–7th	Did not advance			
35–104	Maurice Fleury	France	4th–6th	Did not advance			
35–104	Stan François	France	3rd–6th	Did not advance			
35–104	Gardiès	France	3rd–6th	Did not advance			
35–104	Grad	France	3rd–6th	Did not advance			
35–104	Hérrison	France	3rd–6th	Did not advance			
35–104	Pierre Georges Louis d'Hugues	France	3rd–6th	Did not advance			
35–104	Ivan Ivanovitch	France	3rd–6th	Did not advance			
35–104	Henri de Laborde	France	3rd–6th	Did not advance			
35–104	Lafontaine	France	3rd–6th	Did not advance			
35–104	Lariviére	France	3rd	Did not advance			
35–104	de Lastic	France	3rd–6th	Did not advance			
35–104	de Laugardière	France	3rd–6th	Did not advance			
35–104	Adjutant Lemoine	France	3rd–6th	Did not advance			
35–104	Georges Leroy	France	3rd–6th	Did not advance			
35–104	Charles Loizillon	France	3rd–6th	Did not advance			
35–104	Luquetas	France	3rd–6th	Did not advance			
35–104	Robert Marc	France	4th–6th	Did not advance			
35–104	Massé	France	3rd–6th	Did not advance			
35–104	de Meuse	France	3rd–6th	Did not advance			
35–104	Miller	France	3rd–6th	Did not advance			
35–104	Moreil	France	3rd–6th	Did not advance			
35–104	Achille Morin	France	3rd–6th	Did not advance			
35–104	Mosso	France	3rd–6th	Did not advance			
35–104	Ivan, Viscount d'Oyley	United States	3rd–6th	Did not advance			
35–104	Peberay	France	3rd–6th	Did not advance			
35–104	Mauricio Álvarez de las Asturias Bohorques, 4th Duke of Gor	Spain	3rd–6th	Did not advance			
35–104	de Pradines	France	3rd–7th	Did not advance			
35–104	Preurot	France	3rd–6th	Did not advance			
35–104	Prosper	France	3rd–7th	Did not advance			
35–104	Georges Redeuil	France	3rd–6th	Did not advance			
35–104	Paul Robert	Switzerland	4th–6th	Did not advance			
35–104	Charles Robinson	Great Britain	3rd–6th	Did not advance			
35–104	Joseph Rodrigues	France	3rd–6th	Did not advance			
35–104	Max Rodrigues	France	3rd–6th	Did not advance			
35–104	André de Romilly	France	3rd–6th	Did not advance			
35–104	Pierre Rosenbaum	France	3rd–7th	Did not advance			
35–104	Salvanahac	France	3rd–6th	Did not advance			
35–104	de Segonzac	France	3rd–6th	Did not advance			
35–104	Joseph Sénat	France	3rd–6th	Did not advance			
35–104	Willy Sulzbacher	France	3rd	Did not advance			
35–104	Jean Taillefer	France	4th–6th	Did not advance			
35–104	Adolphe Thomegeux	France	3rd–6th	Did not advance			
35–104	Pierre Thomegeux	France	4th–6th	Did not advance			
35–104	André Tintant	France	3rd–6th	Did not advance			
35–104	de la Tournable	France	3rd–6th	Did not advance			
35–104	de Vars	France	3rd–6th	Did not advance			
35–104	Véve	France	3rd–6th	Did not advance			
35–104	Weber	France	3rd–7th	Did not advance			
