= Fencing at the 1900 Summer Olympics – Men's masters épée =

Men's masters épée at the Games of the II Olympiad
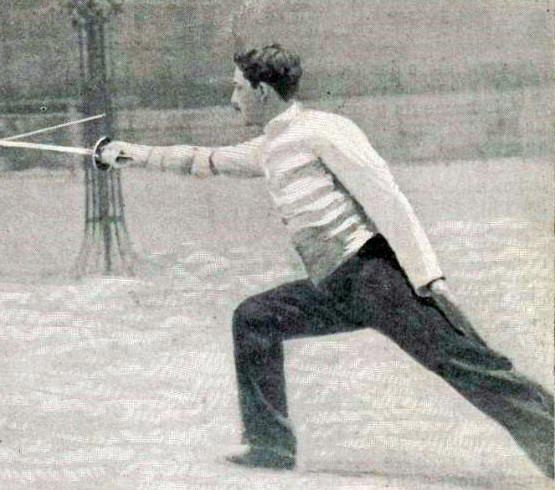
- Gold medalist Albert Ayat fencing
- Venue: Tuileries Garden
- Dates: 11–14 June
- Competitors: 54 from 5 nations

Medalists
1st place, gold medalist(s)		Albert Ayat; France
2nd place, silver medalist(s)		Gilbert Bougnol; France
3rd place, bronze medalist(s)		Henri Laurent; France

The professional event in épée at the 1900 Summer Olympics had 54 fencers from 5 nations compete. The event took place from 11 to 14 June at the Tuileries Garden. The event was won by Albert Ayat of France, leading a French sweep with Gilbert Bougnol taking silver and Henri Laurent bronze.

== Background ==
Fencing was the only sport that had professional competitions at the Olympics in 1900 and 1904. A professional foil event was held in 1900, with épée and sabre joining in 1904. The professional events were not held again afterwards (excepting the 1906 Intercalated Games, so this was the only time that masters épée was contested. The épée events also featured a unique competition: an amateurs-masters épée event. The top 4 fencers in this event, as well as the top 4 fencers in the amateurs épée event, were eligible for that competition.

== Competition format ==
The event used a three-round format: quarterfinals, semifinals, and a final. Each round consisted of pool play. For the quarterfinals, the fencers were divided into 9 pools of 6 fencers each; the top two fencers in each pool advanced to the semifinals. The semifinals had the 18 men compete in 3 pools of 6, with the top 3 in each pool advancing to a 9-man final.

The actual competition format within pools is not entirely clear. No results are known beyond the rankings.

== Schedule ==
Date	Time	Round
Monday, 11 June 1900		Quarterfinals
Tuesday, 12 June 1900		Quarterfinals continued
Wednesday, 13 June 1900		Semifinals
Thursday, 14 June 1900		Final

== Results ==
=== Quarterfinals ===
In the quarterfinals, the fencers were divided into 9 pools of 6 fencers each, with the top two advancing from each pool to the semifinal. The first round was held on 11 and 12 June.

==== Quarterfinal A ====
Rank	Fencer	Nation	Notes
1	Aufort	France	Q
2	Lézard	France	Q
3–6	Debrinay	France	
3–6	Deprey	France	
3–6	Alfred Nau	France	
3–6	Antonius van Nieuwenhuizen	Netherlands	

==== Quarterfinal B ====
Rank	Fencer	Nation	Notes
1	Henri Pantin	France	Q
2	Louis Haller	France	Q
3–6	Assé	France	
3–6	Flahaut	France	
3–6	Joseph-Auguste Métais	France	
3–6	Francis Sabourin	France	

==== Quarterfinal C ====
Rank	Fencer	Nation	Notes
1	Georges Jourdan	France	Q
2	Jean Jeanvoix	France	Q
3–6	Bormel	France	
3–6	Roquais	France	
3–6	Surzet	France	
3–6	Léon Thiércelin	Haiti	

==== Quarterfinal D ====
Rank	Fencer	Nation	Notes
1	Brassart	France	Q
2	Sylvain Lézard	France	Q
3–6	Céré	France	
3–6	Élie Dufraisse	France	
3–6	Louis Garnoty	France	
3–6	Charles Marty	France	

==== Quarterfinal E ====
Rank	Fencer	Nation	Notes
1	Gilbert Bougnol	France	Q
2	Hippolyte-Jacques Hyvernaud	France	Q
3–6	Charles Cléry	France	
3–6	Constant Dulau	France	
3–6	Jean Lafoucrière	France	
3–6	Nègrout	France	

==== Quarterfinal F ====
Rank	Fencer	Nation	Notes
1	Jean Michel	France	Q
2	Félix Ayat	France	Q
3–6	Xavier Anchetti	France	
3–6	Emmanuel Andrieu	France	
3–6	Márton Endrédy	Hungary	
3–6	Launay	France	

==== Quarterfinal G ====
Rank	Fencer	Nation	Notes
1	Albert Ayat	France	Q
2	Henri Laurent	France	Q
3–6	Unknown		

==== Quarterfinal H ====
Rank	Fencer	Nation	Notes
1	Marie-Louis Damotte	France	Q
2	Henri Yvon	France	Q
3–6	Unknown		

==== Quarterfinal I ====
Rank	Fencer	Nation	Notes
1	Georges-Louis Bézy	France	Q
2	Charles Clappier	France	Q
3–6	Unknown		

=== Semifinals ===
The semifinals were held on 13 June. 3 pools with 6 fencers each competed in round-robin format, with the top 3 fencers in each pool advancing.

==== Semifinal A ====
Rank	Fencer	Nation	Notes
1	Georges Jourdan	France	Q
2	Lézard	France	Q
3	Marie-Louis Damotte	France	Q
4-6	Aufort	France	
4-6	Jean Jeanvoix	France	
4-6	Henri Pantin	France	

==== Semifinal B ====
Rank	Fencer	Nation	Notes
1	Gilbert Bougnol	France	Q
2	Brassart	France	Q
3	Hippolyte-Jacques Hyvernaud	France	Q
4-6	Félix Ayat	France	
4-6	Louis Haller	France	
4-6	Jean Michel	France	

==== Semifinal C ====
Rank	Fencer	Nation	Notes
1	Albert Ayat	France	Q
2	Henri Laurent	France	Q
3	Georges-Louis Bézy	France	Q
4-6	Charles Clappier	France	
4-6	Sylvain Lézard	France	
4-6	Henri Yvon	France	

=== Final ===
The final was conducted on 14 June.

Rank	Fencer	Nation
1st place, gold medalist(s)	Albert Ayat	France
2nd place, silver medalist(s)	Gilbert Bougnol	France
3rd place, bronze medalist(s)	Henri Laurent	France
4	Hippolyte-Jacques Hyvernaud	France
5	Marie-Louis Damotte	France
6	Brassart	France
7	Lézard	France
8	Georges Jourdan	France
9	Georges-Louis Bézy	France

== Results summary ==
Rank	Fencer	Nation	Quarterfinals	Semifinals	Final
1st place, gold medalist(s)	Albert Ayat	France	1st	1st	1st
2nd place, silver medalist(s)	Gilbert Bougnol	France	1st	1st	2nd
3rd place, bronze medalist(s)	Henri Laurent	France	2nd	2nd	3rd
4	Hippolyte-Jacques Hyvernaud	France	2nd	3rd	4th
5	Marie-Louis Damotte	France	1st	3rd	5th
6	Brassart	France	1st	2nd	6th
7	Lézard	France	2nd	2nd	7th
8	Georges Jourdan	France	1st	1st	8th
9	Georges-Louis Bézy	France	1st	3rd	9th
10	Aufort	France	1st	4th–6th	Did not advance
10	Félix Ayat	France	2nd	4th–6th	Did not advance
10	Charles Clappier	France	2nd	4th–6th	Did not advance
10	Louis Haller	France	2nd	4th–6th	Did not advance
10	Jean Jeanvoix	France	2nd	4th–6th	Did not advance
10	Sylvain Lézard	France	2nd	4th–6th	Did not advance
10	Jean Michel	France	1st	4th–6th	Did not advance
10	Henri Pantin	France	1st	4th–6th	Did not advance
10	Henri Yvon	France	2nd	4th–6th	Did not advance
19	Xavier Anchetti	France	3rd–6th	Did not advance	
19	Emmanuel Andrieu	France	3rd–6th	Did not advance	
19	Assé	France	3rd–6th	Did not advance	
19	Bormel	France	3rd–6th	Did not advance	
19	Céré	France	3rd–6th	Did not advance	
19	Charles Cléry	France	3rd–6th	Did not advance	
19	Debrinay	France	3rd–6th	Did not advance	
19	Deprey	France	3rd–6th	Did not advance	
19	Élie Dufraisse	France	3rd–6th	Did not advance	
19	Constant Dulau	France	3rd–6th	Did not advance	
19	Márton Endrédy	Hungary	3rd–6th	Did not advance	
19	Flahaut	France	3rd–6th	Did not advance	
19	Louis Garnoty	France	3rd–6th	Did not advance	
19	Jean Lafoucrière	France	3rd–6th	Did not advance	
19	Launay	France	3rd–6th	Did not advance	
19	Charles Marty	France	3rd–6th	Did not advance	
19	Joseph-Auguste Métais	France	3rd–6th	Did not advance	
19	Alfred Nau	France	3rd–6th	Did not advance	
19	Nègrout	France	3rd–6th	Did not advance	
19	Antonius van Nieuwenhuizen	Netherlands	3rd–6th	Did not advance	
19	Roquais	France	3rd–6th	Did not advance	
19	Francis Sabourin	France	3rd–6th	Did not advance	
19	Surzet	France	3rd–6th	Did not advance	
19	Léon Thiércelin	Haiti	3rd–6th	Did not advance	
19	12 unknown competitors		3rd–6th	Did not advance	
