= Fencing at the 1900 Summer Olympics – Men's masters sabre =

Men's masters sabre at the Games of the II Olympiad
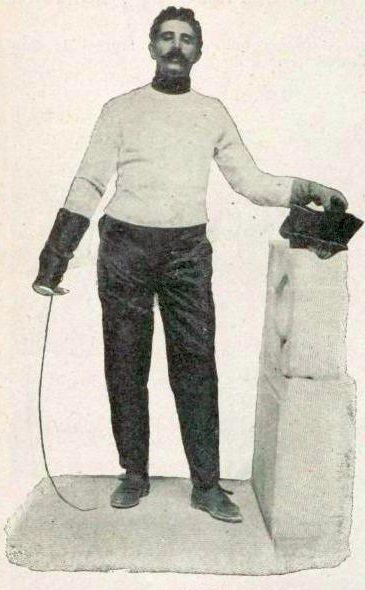
- Gold medalist Antonio Conte
- Venue: Tuileries Garden
- Dates: 23–27 June
- Competitors: 27 from 7 nations

Medalists
1st place, gold medalist(s)		Antonio Conte; Italy
2nd place, silver medalist(s)		Italo Santelli; Italy
3rd place, bronze medalist(s)		Milan Neralić; Austria

The professional sabre competition at the 1900 Summer Olympics involved 27 fencers from 7 nations. It was held from 23 to 27 June at the Tuileries Garden. The event was won by Antonio Conte of Italy, with that nation also receiving second place with Italo Santelli. Austria's Milan Neralić finished third.

== Background ==
Fencing was the only sport that had professional competitions at the Olympics in 1900 and 1904. A professional foil event was held in 1900, with épée and sabre joining in 1904. The professional events were not held again afterwards (excepting the 1906 Intercalated Games, so this was the only time that masters sabre was contested.

== Competition format ==
The event used a three-round format: quarterfinals, semifinals, and a final. Each round consisted of pool play. For the quarterfinals, the fencers were divided into 4 pools of 6 of 7 fencers each; the top four fencers in each pool advanced to the semifinals. The semifinals had the 16 men compete in 2 pools of 8, with the top 4 in each pool advancing to an 8-man final.

The actual competition format within pools is not entirely clear. The pool composition in the quarterfinals is unknown.

== Schedule ==
Date	Time	Round
Saturday, 23 June 1900		Quarterfinals
Monday, 25 June 1900		Semifinals
Wednesday, 27 June 1900	13:30	Final

== Results ==
=== Quarterfinals ===
The first round was held on 23 June. There were four pools, with the top four fencers advancing to the semifinals from each pool.

Fencer	Nation	Notes
Xavier Anchetti	France	Q
François Brun-Buisson	France	Q
Camier	France	Q
Alexandre Chantelat	France	Q
Charles Clappier	France	Q
Antonio Conte	Italy	Q
François Delibes	France	Q
Hébrant	Belgium	Q
Lajos Horváth	Hungary	Q
Julian Michaux	Russian Empire	Q
Louis Midelair	France	Q
Milan Neralić	Austria	Q
Georges Pinault	France	Q
Italo Santelli	Italy	Q
Orazio Santelli	Italy	Q
Petro Zakovorot	Russian Empire	Q
Élie Aufort	France	
Charles Bersin	France	
Henri Coquelin	France	
Dambremat	France	
Vincent Dargein	France	
Henri Delamaide	France	
Márton Endrédy	Hungary	
Louis Flahaut	France	
Marius Gabriel	France	
Otto Schoenfeld	United States	
Schoenfeld	France	
Luc Alessandri	France	

=== Semifinals ===
The 16 fencers were divided into 2 pools of 8 each, playing round-robin tournaments on 25 and 26 June. The top four in each pool advanced to the final.

==== Semifinal A ====
Rank	Fencer	Nation	Wins	Losses	Notes
1	Antonio Conte	Italy	6	1	Q
2	Hébrant	Belgium	5	2	Q
3	François Delibes	France	5	2	Q
4	Milan Neralić	Austria	5	2	Q
5	Lajos Horváth	Hungary	3	4	
6	François Brun-Buisson	France	1	6	
7	Charles Clappier	France	0	7	
8	Orazio Santelli	Italy	3	4	

==== Semifinal B ====
Rank	Fencer	Nation	Wins	Losses	Notes
1	Italo Santelli	Italy	6	1	Q
2	Julian Michaux	Russian Empire	6	1	Q
3	Petro Zakovorot	Russian Empire	5	2	Q
4	Xavier Anchetti	France	4	3	Q
5	Alexandre Chantelat	France	3	4	
6	Georges Pinault	France	2	5	
7	Camier	France	2	5	
8	Louis Midelair	France	0	7	

=== Final ===
The final was held on 27 June, with a round-robin among the final 8 fencers. Ties were broken by an extra bout.

Rank	Fencer	Nation	Wins	Losses
1st place, gold medalist(s)	Antonio Conte	Italy	7	0
2nd place, silver medalist(s)	Italo Santelli	Italy	6	1
3rd place, bronze medalist(s)	Milan Neralić	Austria	4	3
4	François Delibes	France	3	4
4	Julian Michaux	Russian Empire	3	4
6	Xavier Anchetti	France	2	5
6	Petro Zakovorot	Russian Empire	2	5
8	Hébrant	Belgium	1	6

Barrage for 4th place

Rank	Fencer	Nation	Wins	Losses
4	François Delibes	France	1	0
5	Julian Michaux	Russian Empire	0	1

Barrage for 6th place

Rank	Fencer	Nation	Wins	Losses
6	Xavier Anchetti	France	1	0
7	Petro Zakovorot	Russian Empire	0	1

== Results summary ==
Rank	Fencer	Nation	Quarterfinals	Semifinals			Final	
Rank	Fencer	Nation	Quarterfinals	Wins	Losses	Rank	Wins	Losses
1st place, gold medalist(s)	Antonio Conte	Italy	1st–4th	6	1	1st	7	0
2nd place, silver medalist(s)	Italo Santelli	Italy	1st–4th	6	1	1st	6	1
3rd place, bronze medalist(s)	Milan Neralić	Austria	1st–4th	5	2	4th	4	3
4	François Delibes	France	1st–4th	5	2	3rd	3+1	4+0
5	Julian Michaux	Russian Empire	1st–4th	6	1	2nd	3+0	4+1
6	Xavier Anchetti	France	1st–4th	4	3	4th	2+1	5+0
7	Petro Zakovorot	Russian Empire	1st–4th	5	2	3rd	2+0	5+1
8	Hébrant	Belgium	1st–4th	5	2	2nd	1	6
9	Alexandre Chantelat	France	1st–4th	3	4	5th	Did not advance	
9	Lajos Horváth	Hungary	1st–4th	3	4	5th	Did not advance	
11	François Brun-Buisson	France	1st–4th	1	6	6th	Did not advance	
11	Georges Pinault	France	1st–4th	2	5	6th	Did not advance	
13	Camier	France	1st–4th	2	5	7th	Did not advance	
13	Charles Clappier	France	1st–4th	0	7	7th	Did not advance	
15	Louis Midelair	France	1st–4th	0	7	8th	Did not advance	
15	Orazio Santelli	Italy	1st–4th	3	4	8th	Did not advance	
17–27	Aufort	France	5th–7th	Did not advance				
17–27	Charles Bersin	France	5th–7th	Did not advance				
17–27	Henri Coquelin	France	5th–7th	Did not advance				
17–27	Dambremat	France	5th–7th	Did not advance				
17–27	Vincent Dargein	France	5th–7th	Did not advance				
17–27	Henri Delamaide	France	5th–7th	Did not advance				
17–27	Márton Endrédy	Hungary	5th–7th	Did not advance				
17–27	Flahaut	France	5th–7th	Did not advance				
17–27	Marie-Joseph Gabriel	France	5th–7th	Did not advance				
17–27	Otto Schoenfeld	United States	5th–7th	Did not advance				
17–27	Schoenfeld	France	5th–7th	Did not advance				
17–27	Luc Alessandri	France	5th–7th	Did not advance				
