= Fencing at the 1900 Summer Olympics – Men's amateurs-masters épée =

Fencing at the Olympics

Men's amateurs and masters épée at the Games of the II Olympiad
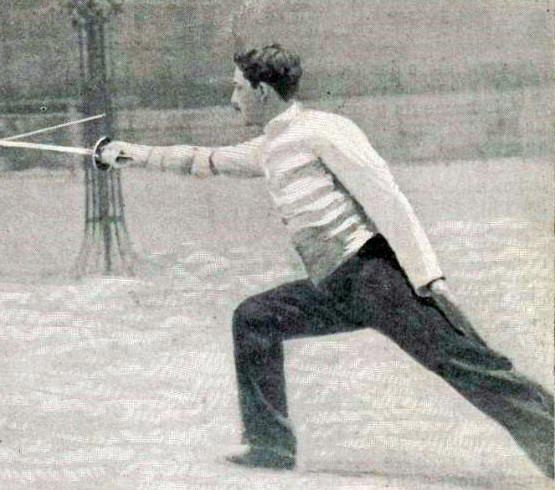
- Gold medalist Albert Ayat
- Venue: Tuileries Garden
- Date: 15 June
- Competitors: 8 from 2 nations

Medalists
1st place, gold medalist(s)		Albert Ayat; France
2nd place, silver medalist(s)		Ramón Fonst; Cuba
3rd place, bronze medalist(s)		Léon Sée; France

The amateurs-masters épée was an event at the 1900 Summer Olympics. It was held on 15 June at the Tuileries Garden. There were 8 competitors from two nations (France and Cuba). The event was won by Albert Ayat of France. Ramón Fonst of Cuba took silver, while Léon Sée of France earned bronze.

This event highlighted the singular position of the sport of fencing in the early Olympic movement. In most of the other sports on the program, competitors had to be amateurs. Furthermore, amateur standing was typically lost when one competed against a professional, even if there was no money involved in that particular competition. In fencing, however, professionals were allowed to compete in the Olympics.

The 1900 amateurs-masters épée fencing event pitted the best amateur épéeists against the best professionals. The top four placers in each of those two events were qualified to compete in the open event, which consisted of a single round-robin tournament with single-touch bouts. The gold medal in the event was taken by a master, but the next three places all went to amateurs.

== Background ==
Fencing was the only sport that had professional competitions at the Olympics in 1900 and 1904. A professional foil event was held in 1900, with épée and sabre joining in 1904. The professional events were not held again afterwards (excepting the 1906 Intercalated Games. The épée events also featured a unique competition: an amateurs-masters épée event. The top 4 fencers in the masters épée event, as well as the top 4 fencers in the amateurs épée event, were eligible for this competition. It was the only time an amateurs-masters competition was held at the Olympics.

== Qualification ==
The qualification for this event was through the results of other 1900 Olympic events, rather than being determined before the Games as most modern events. The top 4 fencers in the final pool of each of the masters and amateurs épée events were eligible to compete in this event.

== Competition format ==
A single round of round-robin pool fencing was held. The 8 fencers each faced all others. Bouts were to 1 touch.

== Schedule ==
Date	Time	Round
Friday, 15 June 1900	14:00	Final

== Results ==
Rank	Fencer	Nation	Wins	Losses	Status
1st place, gold medalist(s)	Albert Ayat	France	7	0	Professional
2nd place, silver medalist(s)	Ramón Fonst	Cuba	6	1	Amateur
3rd place, bronze medalist(s)	Léon Sée	France	4	3	Amateur
4	Georges de la Falaise	France	3	4	Amateur
5	Gilbert Bougnol	France	2	5	Professional
5	Hippolyte-Jacques Hyvernaud	France	2	5	Professional
5	Henri Laurent	France	2	5	Professional
5	Louis Perrée	France	2	5	Amateur
