= Austria at the 1900 Summer Olympics =

- IOC code: AUT
- NOC: Committee for the Supply of the Olympic Games in Paris

in Paris, France 14 May 1900 – 28 October 1900
- Competitors: 16 in 4 sports and 17 events
- Medals Ranked 16th: Gold 0 Silver 3 Bronze 3 Total 6

Summer Olympics appearances (overview)
- 1896; 1900; ~~1904~~; 1908; 1912; 1920; 1924; 1928; 1932; 1936; 1948; 1952; 1956; 1960; 1964; 1968; 1972; 1976; 1980; 1984; 1988; 1992; 1996; 2000; 2004; 2008; 2012; 2016; 2020; 2024; 2028

Other related appearances
- 1906 Intercalated Games

Austria competed at the 1900 Summer Olympics in Paris, France. Austrian and Hungarian results at early Olympics are generally kept separate despite the union of the two nations as Austria-Hungary at the time.

14 Austrian competitors entered 3 disciplines, with 20 entries across 11 events.

== Medalists ==
The following competitors won medals at the games. In the discipline sections below, the medalists' names are bolded.

Medal	Name	Sport	Event	Date
Silver	Otto Wahle	Swimming	1000 metre freestyle	August 12
Silver	Karl Ruberl	Swimming	200 metre backstroke	August 12
Silver	Otto Wahle	Swimming	200 metre obstacle event	August 12
Bronze	Siegfried Flesch	Fencing	Men's sabre	June 25
Bronze	Milan Neralić	Fencing	Men's masters sabre	June 27
Bronze	Karl Ruberl	Swimming	200 metre freestyle	August 12

Medals by sport
Sport	1st place, gold medalist(s)	2nd place, silver medalist(s)	3rd place, bronze medalist(s)	Total
Fencing	0	0	2	**2**
Swimming	0	3	1	**4**
Total	0	3	3	6

=== Multiple medalists ===
The following competitors won multiple medals at the 1900 Olympic Games.

Name	Medal	Sport	Event
Otto Wahle	Silver; Silver	Swimming	1000 metre freestyle 200 metre backstroke
Karl Ruberl	Silver; Bronze	Swimming	200 metre freestyle 200 metre obstacle event

== Competitors ==
The following is a list of number of competitors in the Games and selected biographies.

Sport	Men	Women	Total
Athletics	2	0	2
Equestrian	2	0	2
Fencing	8	0	8
Swimming	4	0	4
Total	16	0	16

== Athletics ==
Track & road events

Athlete	Event	Heat		Final	
Athlete	Event	Time	Rank	Time	Rank
Cornelius von Lubowiecki	400 m	DNS		Did not advance	
Cornelius von Lubowiecki	800 m	DNS		Did not advance	
Hermann Wraschtil	1500 m	—N/a		Unknown	6
Hermann Wraschtil	2500 m steeplechase	—N/a		Unknown	5

Field events

Athlete	Event	Qualification		Final	
Athlete	Event	Distance	Position	Distance	Position
Cornelius von Lubowiecki	Men's discus throw	Unknown		Did not advance	

== Equestrian ==
=== Jumping ===
Athlete	Horse	Event	Time	Rank
Hermann Mandl	Unknown	Individual	Unknown	4-37

=== High jump ===
Athlete	Horse	Event	Height	Rank
Hermann Mandl	Unknown	High jump	Unknown	9-19

=== Long jump ===
Athlete	Horse	Event	Distance	Rank
Hermann Mandl	Unknown	Long jump	Unknown	7-17

=== Hacks and hunter combined ===
Athlete	Horse	Event	Place
Hermann Mandl	Unknown	Hacks and hunter combined	5–51

=== Four-in-hand (mail coach) ===
Athlete	Event	Place
Georges de Zogheb	Mail coach	5–31
Hermann Mandl	Mail coach	5–31

== Fencing ==
Athlete	Event	Round 1			Quarterfinal			Repechage			Semifinal			Final		
Athlete	Event	MW	ML	Rank	MW	ML	Rank	MW	ML	Rank	MW	ML	Rank	MW	ML	Rank
Rudolf Brosch	Men's foil			Q			R			Q	3	4	4 FA	1	6	8
Heinrich Rischtoff	Men's foil				Did not advance											
van der Stoppen	Men's foil			Q	DNS			Did not advance								
Siegfried Flesch	Men's sabre			Q	—N/a								3 Q	4	3	3rd place, bronze medalist(s)
Harstein	Men's sabre			Q	—N/a								5-8	Did not advance		
Camillo Müller	Men's sabre			Q	—N/a								2 Q	1	6	8
Heinrich von Tenner	Men's sabre			Q	—N/a								2 Q	2	5	7
Milan Neralić	Men's sabre			Q	—N/a						5	2	4 Q	4	3	3rd place, bronze medalist(s)

== Swimming ==
Athlete	Event	Heat		Final	
Athlete	Event	Time	Rank	Time	Rank
Richard von Foregger	200 m freestyle	4:32.0	4	Did not advance	
Karl Ruberl	200 m freestyle	2:22.0	1 Q OR	2:32.0	3rd place, bronze medalist(s)
Otto Wahle	200 m freestyle	2:35.6	1 Q	DNS	
Karl Ruberl	1000 m freestyle	DNS		Did not advance	
Otto Wahle	1000 m freestyle	15:27.0	2 q	14:43.6	2nd place, silver medalist(s)
Alois Anderlé	4000 m freestyle	1:26:25.6	4 q	DNF	
Karl Ruberl	200 m backstroke	2:56.0	1 Q	2:56.0	2nd place, silver medalist(s)
Otto Wahle	200 m backstroke	DNS		Did not advance	
Karl Ruberl	200 m obstacle event	3:06.0	2 Q	2:51.2	4
Otto Wahle	200 m obstacle event	2:56.1	1 Q	2:40.0	2nd place, silver medalist(s)

Athlete	Event	Final	
Athlete	Event	Score	Rank
Alois Anderlé	Underwater	69.4	13
