= Fencing at the 1900 Summer Olympics – Men's sabre =

Men's sabre at the Games of the II Olympiad
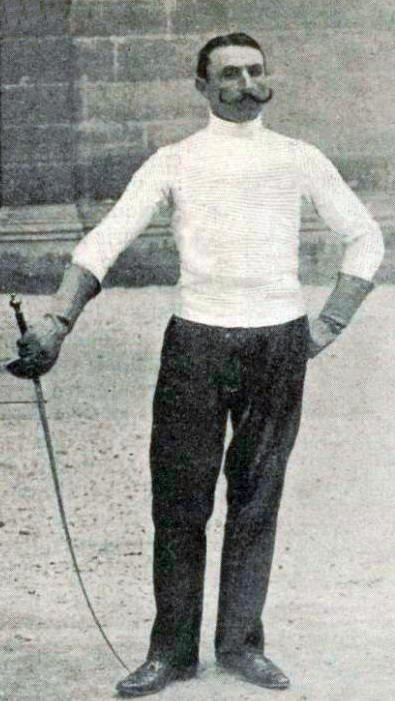
- Georges de la Falaise
- Venue: Tuileries Garden
- Dates: 19–25 June
- Competitors: 23 from 7 nations

Medalists
1st place, gold medalist(s)		Georges de la Falaise	France
2nd place, silver medalist(s)		Léon Thiébaut	France
3rd place, bronze medalist(s)		Siegfried Flesch	Austria

23 fencers from 7 nations competed in the amateur sabre competition. The event was won by Georges de la Falaise of France, with his countryman Léon Thiébaut placing second. Austrian Siegfried Flesch was third.

== Background ==
This was the second appearance of the event, which is the only fencing event to have been held at every Summer Olympics. The competition had a much smaller, yet also more international, field than the other 1900 fencing events; less than half of the entrants were French.

France, Germany, Hungary, Italy, Spain, and Switzerland all made their debut in the men's sabre. Austria was the only nation to have competed at both the 1896 and 1900 appearances of the event.

== Competition format ==
The event used a three-round format (quarterfinals, semifinals, final). Each round used round-robin pool play with actual results counting toward placement (as opposed to foil, which had multiple rounds of jury selection rather than results being used). Standard sabre rules were used, except that the target area was the entire body (rather than being limited to above the waist).

- Quarterfinals: The 23 fencers competed in four round-robin pools of 5 or 6 fencers each. The top four in each pool advanced to the semifinals. (Because of withdrawals, the fifth-placed fencer in two of the pools advanced).
- Semifinals: The 16 fencers from the quarterfinals were divided into two pools of 8 fencers each. Each pool played a round robin. The top four fencers in each semifinal pool advanced to the final.
- Final: The final pool had 8 fencers.

== Schedule ==
Date	Time	Round
Tuesday, 19 June 1900		Quarterfinals
Wednesday, 20 June 1900		Quarterfinals continued
Friday, 22 June 1900	14:00	Semifinals
Monday, 25 June 1900		Final

== Results ==
=== Quarterfinals ===
The fencers competed in four round-robin pools in the first round on 19 and 20 June. The top four fencers in each pool advanced to the semifinals. Which fencers competed in which pools is unknown.

Fencer	Nation	Notes
Maurice Boisdon	France	Q
Clément de Boissière	France	Q
Gaston Dutertre	France	Q
Georges de la Falaise	France	Q
Giunio Fedreghini	Italy	Q
Siegfried Flesch	Austria	Q
Mauricio, 4th Duke of Gor	Spain	Q
Harstein	Austria	Q
Hugó Hoch	Hungary	Q
Pierre Georges Louis d'Hugues	France	Q
Gyula von Iványi	Hungary	Q
Léon Lécuyer	France	Q
Camillo Müller	Austria	Q
Amon Ritter von Gregurich	Hungary	Q
Heinrich von Tenner	Austria	Q
Léon Thiébaut	France	Q
Stagliano	Italy	q
Miklós Todoresku	Hungary	q
François de Boffa	Switzerland	
Émile Lafourcade-Cortina	France	
Alfons Schöne	Germany	
Casimir Semelaignes	France	
Fernand Semelaignes	France	

=== Semifinals ===
The 16 remaining fencers were divided into two pools of 8. They played round-robin tournaments on 22 June, with four advancing from each pool to the final.

==== Semifinal A ====
Rank	Fencer	Nation	Notes
1	Gyula von Iványi	Hungary	Q
2	Camillo Müller	Austria	Q
3	Siegfried Flesch	Austria	Q
4	Georges de la Falaise	France	Q
5–8	Maurice Boisdon	France	
5–8	Harstein	Austria	
5–8	Pierre Georges Louis d'Hugues	France	
5–8	Giunio Fedreghini	Italy	

==== Semifinal B ====
Rank	Fencer	Nation	Notes
1	Amon Ritter von Gregurich	Hungary	Q
2	Heinrich von Tenner	Austria	Q
3	Clément de Boissière	France	Q
4	Léon Thiébaut	France	Q
5–8	Hugó Hoch	Hungary	
5–8	Mauricio, 4th Duke of Gor	Spain	
5–8	Stagliano	Italy	
5–8	Miklós Todoresku	Hungary	

=== Final ===
The final was a round-robin among the 8 remaining fencers.

Rank	Fencer	Nation	Wins	Losses
1st place, gold medalist(s)	Georges de la Falaise	France	6	1
2nd place, silver medalist(s)	Léon Thiébaut	France	5	2
3rd place, bronze medalist(s)	Siegfried Flesch	Austria	4	3
4	Amon Ritter von Gregurich	Hungary	4	3
5	Gyula von Iványi	Hungary	3	4
6	Clément de Boissière	France	3	4
7	Heinrich von Tenner	Austria	2	5
8	Camillo Müller	Austria	1	6

== Results summary ==
Rank	Fencer	Nation	Quarterfinals	Semifinals	Final	
Rank	Fencer	Nation	Quarterfinals	Semifinals	Wins	Losses
1st place, gold medalist(s)	Georges de la Falaise	France	1st–4th	4th	6	1
2nd place, silver medalist(s)	Léon Thiébaut	France	1st–4th	4th	5	2
3rd place, bronze medalist(s)	Siegfried Flesch	Austria	1st–4th	3rd	4	3
4	Amon Ritter von Gregurich	Hungary	1st–4th	1st	4	3
5	Gyula von Iványi	Hungary	1st–4th	1st	3	4
6	Clément de Boissière	France	1st–4th	3rd	3	4
7	Heinrich von Tenner	Austria	1st–4th	2nd	2	5
8	Camillo Müller	Austria	1st–4th	2nd	1	6
9–16	Maurice Boisdon	France	1st–4th	5th–8th	Did not advance	
9–16	Giunio Fedreghini	Italy	1st–4th	5th–8th	Did not advance	
9–16	Harstein	Austria	1st–4th	5th–8th	Did not advance	
9–16	Hugó Hoch	Hungary	1st–4th	5th–8th	Did not advance	
9–16	Pierre Georges Louis d'Hugues	France	1st–4th	5th–8th	Did not advance	
9–16	Mauricio, 4th Duke of Gor	Spain	1st–4th	5th–8th	Did not advance	
9–16	Stagliano	Italy	5th	5th–8th	Did not advance	
9–16	Miklós Todoresku	Hungary	5th	5th–8th	Did not advance	
17	Gaston Dutertre	France	1st–4th	DNS	Did not advance	
17	Léon Lécuyer	France	1st–4th	DNS	Did not advance	
19–23	François de Boffa	Switzerland	5th–6th	Did not advance		
19–23	Émile Lafourcade-Cortina	France	5th–6th	Did not advance		
19–23	Alfons Schöne	Germany	5th–6th	Did not advance		
19–23	Casimir Semelaignes	France	5th–6th	Did not advance		
19–23	Fernand Semelaignes	France	5th–6th	Did not advance		
