= Fencing at the 1900 Summer Olympics =

Fencing at the Games of the II Olympiad
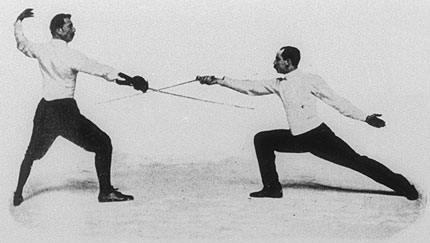
- Italo Santelli (left) and Jean-Baptiste Mimiague competing in the masters foil event. Mimiague won both bouts between the two.
- Venue: Tuileries Garden
- Dates: 14 May – 27 June 1900
- No. of events: 7 (7 men, 0 women)
- Competitors: 260 from 19 nations

At the 1900 Summer Olympics, seven fencing events were contested. 260 fencers from 19 nations competed. The events took place at the Tuileries Garden.

== Medal summary ==
Games	Gold	Silver	Bronze
Épée, Individual	Ramón Fonst; Cuba	Louis Perrée; France	Léon Sée; France
Épée, Masters	Albert Robert Ayat; France	Émile Bougnol; France	Henri Laurent; France
Épée, Amateurs-Masters	Albert Robert Ayat; France	Ramón Fonst; Cuba	Léon Sée; France
Foil, Individual	Émile Coste; France	Henri Masson; France	Marcel Boulenger; France
Foil, Masters	Lucien Mérignac; France	Alphonse Kirchhoffer; France	Jean-Baptiste Mimiague; France
Sabre, Individual	Georges de la Falaise; France	Léon Thiébaut; France	Siegfried Flesch; Austria
Sabre, Masters	Antonio Conte; Italy	Italo Santelli; Italy	Milan Neralić; Austria

== Weekly summary ==
The fencing events were spread out over a good deal of time. The competitions began on Monday, 14 May.

=== 14–20 May ===
- The first round of the amateur foil competition was held on 14 May and 15 May. Judging was subjective, a change from the 3-touch format from four years earlier. 37 of the 54 fencers advanced, including some who had nominally lost their bouts (when the judges felt that both fencers displayed good skill) and excluding some who had nominally won.
- The quarterfinals, repechage, and semifinals were also held for the foil event in the first week. The quarterfinals and repechage were again judged subjectively, but the semifinal was a round-robin pool format with matches won or lost counting towards advancement to the final. The only non-French fencer to advance past this stage was Rudolf Brosch of Austria.

=== 21–27 May ===
- The foil competition continued with the consolation pool and the final on 21 May. These round-robin pools determined the top 16 places in the tournament, with the top 7 going to France as Brosch finished last in the final.
- The first two rounds, the repechage, and the first half of the semifinals of the masters foil event were held this week. Again, early rounds were judged subjectively but the semifinal used match results.

=== 28 May-3 June ===
- The masters foil competition concluded with the second half of the semifinals on 28 May and the consolation and final rounds on 29 May. France again swept the medals, though Italians Antonio Conte and Italo Santelli made strong showings, with 4th and 7th places, respectively.
- Épée made its Olympic debut, with the amateur event beginning with part of the first round on 1 June and 2 June. All rounds of the event consisted of round-robin pools.

=== 4–10 June ===
- The épée competition continued with the second half of the first round, the quarterfinals, and the semifinals. Ramón Fonst of Cuba and Eduardo Camet of Argentina joined 7 French épéeists in advancing to the final.

=== 11–17 June ===
- The masters épée competition began on 11 June, with the semifinals on 13 June. France dominated the competition, taking all of the finals spots.
- On 14 June, the finals of both the masters and amateur épée events were held. France took its third medal sweep in the masters event, but Fonst took the gold in the amateur event to give Cuba its first Olympic medal.
- An unusual event, a competition between the amateurs and masters in the épée, was held on 15 June. The top four fencers in each class played in a one-day round-robin pool in the amateur-master event. Albert Robert Ayat, the winner of the professional event, went undefeated to win the gold medal, but the amateurs took the next three spots, including a silver medal for Fonst to make Cuba one of two nations in 1900 to win a medal with every competition entry (Luxembourg, with a marathon win as their only entry, was the other).

=== 18–24 June ===
- The first round, semifinals, and final of the amateur sabre event were held. The sabre events were much more internationally balanced than the other two weapons, with 3 Austrians, 2 Hungarians, and 3 Frenchmen making the final. France still took the top two spots, giving the host nation its 5th gold medal in 6 attempts.
- The first round and the semifinals of the masters event of the sabre also took place in the sixth week of fencing competition. In the most international field of the events, the 8 fencers advancing to the final hailed from 5 different nations: Italy, France, Russia, Belgium, and Austria.

=== 25–27 June ===
- Fencing competition ended with the final of the masters sabre on Wednesday, 27 June. France won no medals in the event, as Conte and Santelli did even better in the sabre than they had in the foil, winning the gold and silver medals in the sabre. Milan Neralić of Austria took the bronze.

== Participating nations ==
A total of 260 fencers from 19 nations (including 3 nations not recognized by the IOC) competed at the Paris Games:

- Argentina (1)
- Austria (9)
- Belgium (5)
- Cuba (1)
- Denmark (1)
- France (211)
- Germany (1)
- Great Britain (3)
- Haiti (2) – Participation not recognized by IOC.
- Hungary (5)

- Iran (1) – Participation not recognized by IOC.
- Italy (8)
- Netherlands (1)
- Peru (1) – Participation not recognized by IOC.
- Russian Empire (2)
- Spain (1)
- Sweden (1)
- Switzerland (3)
- United States (3)

== Medal table ==
Rank	Nation	Gold	Silver	Bronze	Total
1	France	5	5	5	15
2	Cuba	1	1	0	2
2	Italy	1	1	0	2
4	Austria	0	0	2	2
Totals (4 entries)		7	7	7	21
