= Russian Empire at the 1900 Summer Olympics =

- Flag of the Russian Empire
- IOC code: RU1

in Paris
- Competitors: 4 in 2 sports
- Medals: Gold 0 Silver 0 Bronze 0 Total 0

Summer Olympics appearances (overview)
- 1900; 1904; 1908; 1912

Other related appearances
- Soviet Union (1952–1988); Unified Team (1992); Russia (1994–2016); ROC (2020); Individual Neutral Athletes (2024)

The Russian Empire competed at the 1900 Summer Olympics in Paris. It was the first appearance of the European nation, which had entered the names of competitors for the first modern Olympics in 1896 but had failed to appear.

== Results by event ==
=== Equestrian ===
The Russian team had two riders in the initial Olympic equestrian competitions. Both men competed in the long jump and in the mail coach and de Polyakov competed in the hacks and hunter combined event. One of the two competed in the high jump, though it is not clear which. Similarly, it is not clear which of the two men entered the jumping competition; further, for this event, it is not clear whether the Russian entrant actually competed.

Equestrian	Event	Time, height, or distance	Rank
Unknown	Jumping	Unknown	4–37
Unknown	High jump	Unknown	7–19
Vladimir Nikolayevich Orlov	Long jump	Unknown	9–17
Élie de Polyakov	Long jump	Unknown	9–17
Élie de Polyakov	Hacks and hunter combined	Unknown	5–51
Vladimir Nikolayevich Orlov	Mail coach	Unknown	5–31
Élie de Polyakov	Mail coach	Unknown	5–31

=== Fencing ===
Russia competed in fencing in the nation's first Olympic appearance. The nation sent 3 fencers; all were sabre professionals. Only two competed.

Fencer	Event	Round 1		Quarterfinals		Repechage		Semifinals		Final	
Fencer	Event	Result	Rank	Result	Rank	Result	Rank	Result	Rank	Result	Rank
Julian Michaux	Men's masters sabre	Unknown	1–4 Q	—N/a				6–1	2 Q	3–4	5
Petro Zakovorot	Men's masters sabre	Unknown	1–4 Q	—N/a				5–2	3 Q	2–5	7
