= Cuba at the 1900 Summer Olympics =

- IOC code: CUB
- NOC: Cuban Olympic Committee

in Paris, France
- Competitors: 1 in 1 sport and 2 events
- Medals Ranked 12th: Gold 1 Silver 1 Bronze 0 Total 2

Summer Olympics appearances (overview)
- 1900; 1904; 1908–1920; 1924; 1928; 1932–1936; 1948; 1952; 1956; 1960; 1964; 1968; 1972; 1976; 1980; 1984–1988; 1992; 1996; 2000; 2004; 2008; 2012; 2016; 2020; 2024

Cuba competed at the 1900 Summer Olympics in Paris, France, which were held from 14 May to 28 October 1900. This edition of the games would be the first appearance for Cuba at any of the Olympic Games. The athlete delegation consisted of one singular athlete, fencer Ramón Fonst.

Fonst first competed in the men's épée over 14 days. He had qualified for each round, eventually reaching the finals. There, he defeated his opponent and won the gold medal. He would become the first Cuban and Latin American Olympic medalist. He also competed in the men's amateurs-masters épée, earning silver.

== Background ==
The 1900 Summer Olympics were held in Paris, France, from 14 May to 28 October 1900. Cuba's appearance at these Games was it' first-ever appearance at the Summer Olympics. One athlete represented Cuba at the games, fencer Ramón Fonst. Fonst was born in Havana and moved to France while he was young. There, he began training in fencing.

== Medalists ==
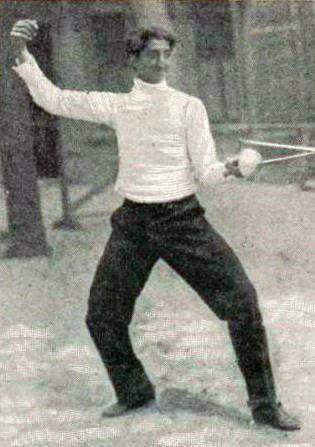
Fonst at the Olympics

List of Cuban medalists at the 1900 Summer Olympics
Medal	Name	Sport	Event	Date
Gold	Ramón Fonst	Fencing	Men's épée	June 14
Silver	Ramón Fonst	Fencing	Men's amateurs-masters épée	June 15

== Fencing ==
Fencing at the Games of the II Olympiad
- Venue: Tuileries Garden
- Dates: 14 May – 27 June 1900
- No. of events: 7 (7 men, 0 women)
- Competitors: 260 from 19 nations

The fencing events were held at the Tuileries Garden. Fonst first competed in the men's épée for amateur competitors from 1 to 14 June. In the first round, he had placed first in his pool and qualified for the second round. At the quarterfinals, he had placed third in his pool and nearly missed qualification. He progressed further to the semifinals and once again placed third in his pool. During the finals, he had won four matches and lost two matches. In the final match of the finals, Fonst went up against Louis Perrée of France who had the same win-loss record. Fonst would eventually win the event and become the first Cuban and Latin American medalist at any edition of the games, both gold and overall.

Fonst would then go on to compete in the men's amateurs-masters épée the following day. He had a win-loss record of 6 wins and 1 loss, losing to Albert Ayat of France in one of his rounds.

Fencing summary
Athlete	Event	Round 1			Quarterfinals			Semifinals			Final		
Athlete	Event	MW	ML	Rank	MW	ML	Rank	MW	ML	Rank	MW	ML	Rank
Ramón Fonst	Men's épée			1Q			3Q			3Q	4	2	1st place, gold medalist(s)
Ramón Fonst	Men's amateurs-masters épée	—									6	1	2nd place, silver medalist(s)
