= Gyula Iványi =

Hungarian fencer (1864–1920)

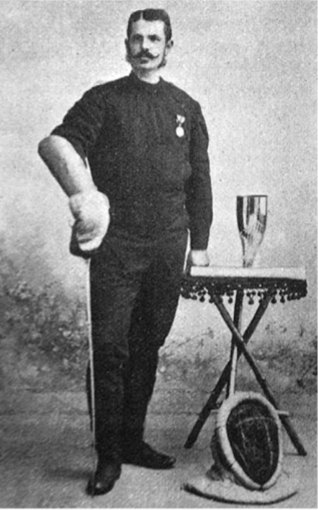

Personal information
- Nationality: Hungarian
- Born: 1864 Buda, Kingdom of Hungary, Austrian Empire
- Died: 6 December 1920 (aged 55–56) Budapest, Kingdom of Hungary

Sport
- Sport: Fencing

Gyula Iványi (10 March 1864 – 6 December 1920) was a Hungarian fencer. He competed in the individual sabre event at the 1900 Summer Olympics, where he finished in 5th place.

Born on 10 March 1864 in Buda, Kingdom of Hungary, he was student of Zsiga Halász who introduced him to fencing. The first national Hungarian sabre fencing competition was held in 1895, and Iványi won the gold medal and the Great Silver Cup of the Minister of Defense. He was a member of the Magyar Atlétikai Club until 1896, when he resigned following their admission of Italo Santelli after his victory at an event organized by MAC in May of that year.

In 1896, Iványi competed against Luigi Barbasetti, the greatest fencer of the era, and defeated him, with one report describing his skill and speed against Barbasetti as "unbelievable." Later that year, he competed in the Milleneum fencing championships and reached the finals against an Italian opponent named Checenini, but quit in the middle of the fight due to what he considered unfair officiating. Checenini agreed with Iványi and was embarrassed when he received the championship trophy.

Iványi participated at the sabre event at the 1900 Summer Olympics, advancing from the first pool and the semifinals to the finals, where he finished fifth place. According to some sources, he would have placed higher had it not been for the bias of French judges; following his result, the Hungarian and Austrian members of the jury, (Note: At the time, Austria and Hungary were joined as the dual kingdom of Austria-Hungary) Ferenc Krasznay and Luigi Barbasetti, resigned in protest. He retired after the event and returned to his job as the head of the Terézváros branch of the United Budapest Capital Savings Bank; in later years he was promoted to director. He died on 6 December 1920 in Budapest. Iványi is regarded by many sources as the first great Hungarian fencer.
