= Sulzbacher =

Sulzbacher is a surname. Notable people with the surname include:

- Louis Sulzbacher (1842–1915), Associate Justice of Supreme Court of Puerto Rico
- Reinhold Sulzbacher (born 1944), Austrian luger
- Valentin Sulzbacher (born 2005), Austrian footballer
- Willy Sulzbacher (1876–1908), French fencer

== See also ==
- Sulzbacher form of the German ß (eszett)
