= Giurato =

Giurato is an Italian surname. Notable people with the surname include:

- Blasco Giurato (1941–2022), Italian cinematographer, brother of Luca
- Giuseppe Giurato, Italian fencer
- Luca Giurato (born 1939), Italian journalist and television presenter
