= Hébrard =

Hébrard is a surname and may refer to:

- Ernest Hébrard (1875–1933), French architect, archaeologist and urban planner
- Henri Hébrard de Villeneuve (1848 –1925), French fencer
- Jacques Hébrard (1841–1917), French journalist and politician
- Joris Hébrard (born 1982), French politician
