= József Keresztessy =

József Keresztessy may refer to:

- József Keresztessy (gymnast) (1885–1962), Hungarian gymnast
- József Keresztessy (fencer) (1819–1895), master of fencing, founder of the sword fencing in Hungary
