= Iran at the 1900 Summer Olympics =

- IOC code: IRI (IRN used at these Games)
- NOC: National Olympic Committee of Iran

in Paris, France
- Competitors: 1 in 1 sport
- Medals: Gold 0 Silver 0 Bronze 0 Total 0

Summer Olympics appearances (overview)
- 1900; 1904–1936; 1948; 1952; 1956; 1960; 1964; 1968; 1972; 1976; 1980–1984; 1988; 1992; 1996; 2000; 2004; 2008; 2012; 2016; 2020; 2024; 2028

Iranian fencer Freydoun Malkom competed at the 1900 Summer Olympics in Paris, thereby making him the first Olympic athlete from Iran and the only one to compete for Qajar Iran. It would not be until Pahlavi Iran and the 1948 Summer Olympics that the nation sent a team to compete at the Olympic Games, where a weightlifting bronze for Jafar Salmasi would become Iran's first Olympic medal.

== Competitors ==
Sport	Men	Women	Total
Fencing	1	0	1
Total	1	0	1

== Results by event ==
=== Fencing ===
Malkom advanced to the quarterfinal pool, but was not able to go further.

Men

Athlete	Event	Round 1		Quarterfinal		Semifinal		Final	Rank
Athlete	Event	Pool	Rank	Pool	Rank	Pool	Rank	Final	Rank
Freydoun Malkom	Individual épée	I	2 Q	D	4–6	Did not advance			19
