= Barbasetti =

Barbasetti is an Italian surname. Notable people with the surname include:

- Curio Barbasetti di Prun (1885–1953), Italian military officer
- Luigi Barbasetti (1859–1948), Italian fencer
