= Francisco Camet =

Argentine fencer

Eduardo Camet
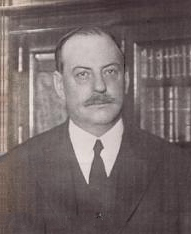

Personal information
- Born: September 16, 1876 Buenos Aires, Argentina
- Died: July 15, 1931 (aged 54) Miramar, Argentina

Sport
- Sport: Fencing
- Club: Salles d'Armes du Palais et Sociétés Savantes, Paris

Francisco Carmelo Camet, also known as Eduardo Camet (September 16, 1876 – July 15, 1931) was the first Argentine fencer to compete at the Summer Olympic Games.

Born in Buenos Aires, he studied in Paris, where he competed at the 1900 Summer Olympics. He entered the épée event, which involved 101 fencers from 10 different countries. In the first round they were drawn into 17 groups, Camet beat four of the fencers, lost to Léon Sée, and finished in second place, good enough for the next round. Then fencers were split into six groups, with the top three from each group qualifying for the next round. Camet again finished second in his group, behind Edmond Wallace, and advanced to the next round. The semi-final involved 18 fencers, 16 of them from France, and again the top three from each group would qualify for the finals. Camet placed third in his group and qualified. There were nine competitors in the final, and Camet had five bouts. He won two and lost three and finished in fifth place overall.

In 1904, his son Carmelo Camet was born in Paris and he would follow in his father's footsteps by competing in the 1928 Summer Olympics in Amsterdam and went one better in winning a bronze medal in the team foil event.
