= Amon Ritter von Gregurich =

Hungarian fencer

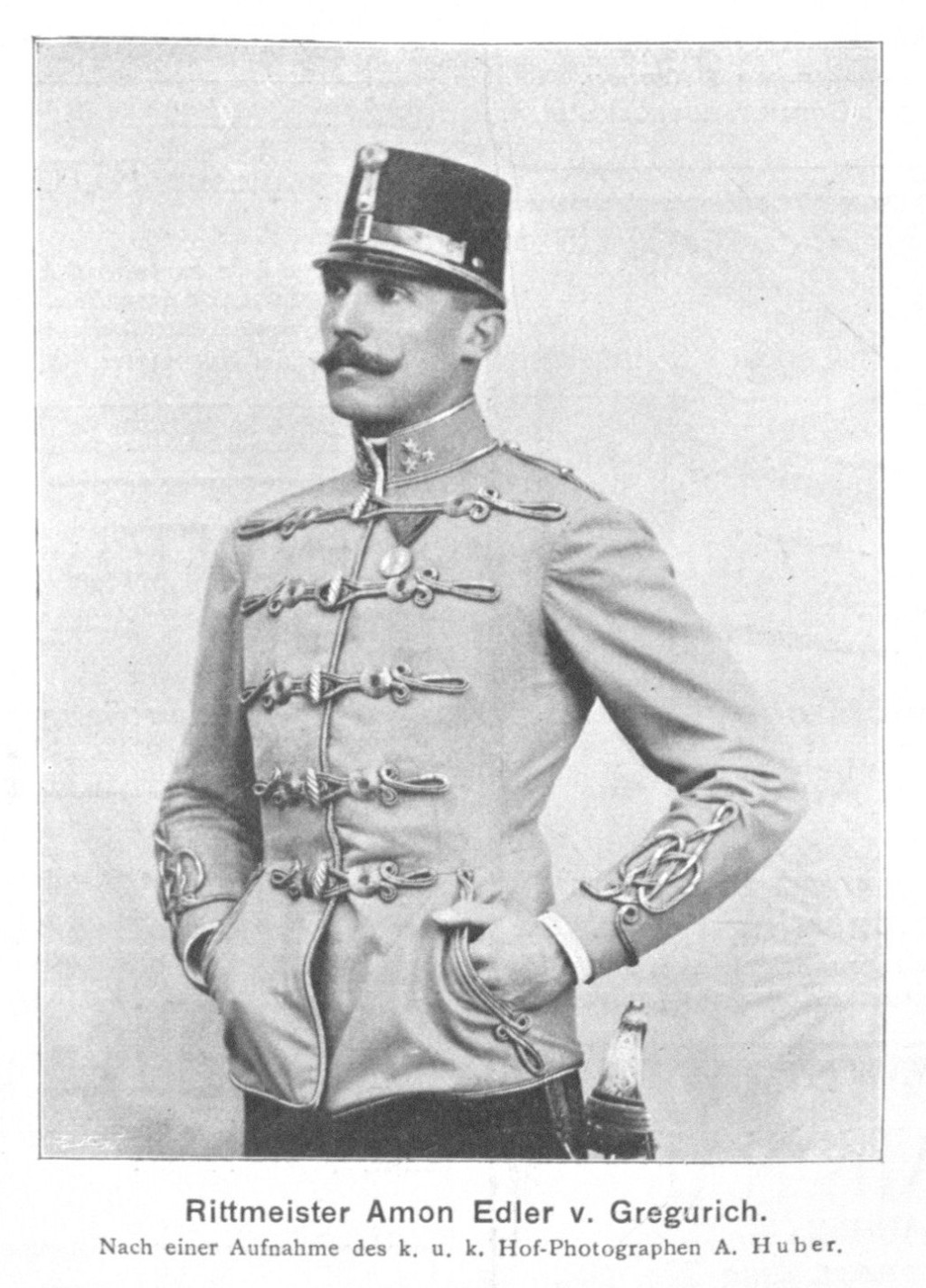
- Amon von Gregurich in 1901

Personal information
- Born: 26 May 1867 Hietzing, Austria-Hungary
- Died: 28 June 1915 (aged 48) Munkács, Kingdom of Hungary

Sport
- Sport: Fencing

Amon Ritter von Gregurich (Hungarian: Gregurich Ámon; 26 May 1867 – 28 June 1915) was a Hungarian fencer. He competed in the individual sabre event at the 1900 Summer Olympics. He was a student of the famous fencing reformer Luigi Barbasetti and was killed in action during World War I.

== See also ==
- List of Olympians killed in World War I
