= Charles Edmund Newton-Robinson =

British barrister and fencer (1853–1913)

Personal information
- Nationality: British
- Born: 14 October 1853 London
- Died: 21 April 1913 (aged 59)
- Education: Westminster School; Trinity College, Cambridge
- Occupation: Barrister
Medal record
Men's fencing
Representing Great Britain
Intercalated Games
Silver medal – second place	1906 Athens	Team épée

Charles Edmund Newton-Robinson (14 October 1853 – 21 April 1913) was a British barrister, author, gemologist, fencer, and yachtsman.

== Early life and family ==
Charles Newton-Robinson was born in London on 14 October 1853, the eldest son of Sir John Charles Robinson. He was educated at Westminster School and then Trinity College, Cambridge.

He married Janetta Anna Stirke.

== Career ==
Newton-Robinson qualified as a barrister of the Inner Temple in 1879. He had a special interest in land development and was the founder and chairman of the Land Union. He played a role in the development of Lee-on-the-Solent, Hampshire, and Tankerton, Kent.

In 1900 he was living at 11 Chesterfield Hill.

== Hobbies ==
Newton-Robinson founded the Épée Club, London, in 1900 and took part in the 1900 Summer Olympics. He was a member of the British fencing team and silver medallist at the 1906 Olympic Games in Athens, now known as the 1906 Intercalated Games. He wrote "Épée-de-Combat" for the 11th edition (1911) of The Encyclopædia Britannica. A collection of his medals is in the National Fencing Museum.

He was a yachtsman and a member of the council of the Yacht-Racing Association.

He collected engraved gems and drawings and was a member of the committee that organised the Exhibition of Ancient Greek Art at the Burlington Club in 1903 and described the gems in that exhibition.

He was a member of the Burlington Fine Arts Club and the Savile Club.

== Death ==
Newton-Robinson died on 21 April 1913.

== Selected publications ==
=== Poetry ===
- The Golden Hind: A Story of the Invincible Armada; Thessalé, and Other Poems. George Bell & Sons, London, 1880.
- Tintinnabula, New Poems. Kegan Paul & Co., London, 1890.
- The Viol of Love. Poems. John Lane, London, 1895.
- Ver Lyræ. Selected poems ... With seven new lyrics. Lawrence & Bullen, London, 1896.

=== Other ===
- The Cruise of the Widgeon. 700 Miles in a Ten-Ton Yawl, from Swanage to Hamburg &c. Chapman & Hall, London, 1876.
- A Royal Warren or Picturesque Rambles in the Isle of Purbeck. Typographic Etching Company, London, 1882. (Illustrated by Alfred Dawson)
- Alice in Plunderland. Eveleigh Nash, London, 1910. (As Loris Carllew) (Illustrated by Linton Jehne)
- "Épée-de-Combat", The Encyclopædia Britannica, 11th edition, 1911.
