= Pierre Thomegeux =

French fencer

Personal information
- Nationality: French

Sport
- Sport: Fencing

Pierre Thomegeux was a French fencer. He competed in the individual épée event at the 1900 Summer Olympics. In the first round he didn't qualify for the quarter-finals. His brother Adolphe Thomegeux was also a fencer who competed in the individual épée event at the 1900 Summer Olympics.
