= Argentina at the 1900 Summer Olympics =

- IOC code: ARG
- NOC: Argentine Olympic Committee

in Paris, France May 14, 1900 – October 28, 1900
- Competitors: 1 in 1 sport and 1 event
- Medals: Gold 0 Silver 0 Bronze 0 Total 0

Summer Olympics appearances (overview)
- 1900; 1904; 1908; 1912; 1920; 1924; 1928; 1932; 1936; 1948; 1952; 1956; 1960; 1964; 1968; 1972; 1976; 1980; 1984; 1988; 1992; 1996; 2000; 2004; 2008; 2012; 2016; 2020; 2024; 2028

Argentina competed at the 1900 Summer Olympics in Paris, France, the nation's debut appearance out of two editions of the Summer Olympic Games. Argentina did not participate in the inaugural 1896 Summer Olympics. Francisco Camet has the distinction of being Argentina's debut Olympian in the nation's debut Olympic sporting event, men's épée, placing fifth overall.

== Competitors ==
The following is the list of number of competitors in the Games.

Sport	Men	Women	Total
Fencing	1	0	1
Total	1	0	1

== Fencing ==
Francisco Camet was a single Argentine fencer in the men's épée who advanced three rounds to the final pool, where he placed 5th.

Athlete	Event	Round 1			Quarterfinals			Semifinals			Final		
Athlete	Event	MW	ML	Rank	MW	ML	Rank	MW	ML	Rank	MW	ML	Rank
Francisco Camet	Men's épée			2Q			2Q			3Q	2	3	5
