= Georges Jourdan =

French fencer

Personal information
- Full name: Georges Charles Jourdan
- Born: 2 March 1872 Chémeré-le-Roi, Mayenne, France
- Died: 22 September 1944 Paris, Occupied France

Sport
- Sport: Fencing

Georges Charles Jourdan (2 March 1872 – 22 September 1944) was a French fencer. He competed in the individual épée masters event at the 1900 Summer Olympics, finishing 8th.
