= Heinrich von Tenner =

Austrian fencer

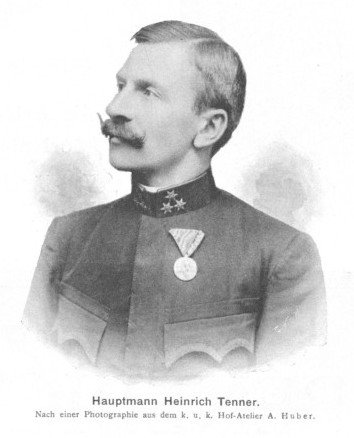

Personal information
- Born: 9 February 1865 Königgräz, Austrian Empire
- Died: 23 January 1949 (aged 83) Vienna, Austria

Sport
- Sport: Fencing

Heinrich von Tenner (9 February 1865 – 23 January 1949) was an Austrian fencer and general.

In 1893/1894 he was a fencing teacher at the Prague cadet school and a year later he taught saber fencing in Vienna newtown.Tenner became a member of the Viennese "Union Fechtclub" in 1895 and was a student of the fencing reformer Luigi Barbasetti, for whom he translated the textbook "Säbelfechten" into German. In 1910 he became commander of the Wiener Neustadt course. On December 1, 1926, he became Secretary General of the German Fencing Federation and helped train suitable fencers for the 1928 Olympic Games. From January 1930 to 1939 he was also President of the "Akademie der Fechtkunst" in Vienna until it was dissolved. One of his most famous students was Milan Neralic.

He competed in the individual sabre event at the 1900 Summer Olympics.
