= Hermann Wraschtil =

Austrian middle-distance runner

Personal information
- Born: 15 July 1879
- Died: 9 November 1950 (aged 70)

Sport
- Sport: Athletics

Hermann Wraschtil (15 July 1879 – 9 November 1950) was an Austrian track and field athletes who competed in the 1900 Summer Olympics.

At the Summer Olympics 1900 in Paris he participated in two events. In the 1500 metres race he finished sixth and in the 2500 metre steeplechase race he finished fifth.
