= Félix Ayat =

French fencer

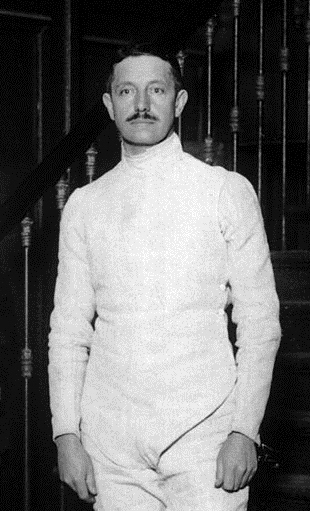
- Félix Ayat in 1926

Personal information
- Born: 15 September 1882 Paris, France
- Died: 4 April 1972 (aged 89) Boulogne-Billancourt, France
- Height: 1.75 m (5 ft 9 in)

Sport
- Sport: Fencing
- Club: CEA, Paris

Albert Louis Félix Ayat (15 September 1882 – 4 April 1972) was a French fencer. He competed in the individual épée at the 1900 Summer Olympics, alongside his elder brother Albert Jean Louis Ayat, who won the event.
