= Freydoun Malkom =

Iranian fencer

Personal information
- Native name: فریدون ملکم خان
- Full name: Freydoun Malkom Khan
- Nationality: Iranian (Persian)
- Born: 25 December 1875 London, United Kingdom
- Died: 4 June 1954 (aged 78) Brighton, United Kingdom
- Father: Mirza Malkam Khan

Sport
- Sport: Fencing
- Event: épée

Freydoun Malcolm Khan (Persian: فریدون ملکم خان; 25 December 1875 – 4 June 1954), variously spelled Firidun Malkom Khan and Freydoun Malkom Khan was an Iranian fencer and diplomat. Born in London to diplomat Mirza Malkam Khan, he would attend Eton College and the École spéciale militaire de Saint-Cyr. He would later be designated as the special adjutant at the Persian Embassy in Paris and later in Rome. Due to his and his father's service as a diplomat, they would be granted the royal title of Prince by Mozaffar ad-Din Shah Qajar.

At the time Khan was a student and worked in the Embassy, the Shah would nominate him to compete at the 1900 Summer Olympics. There, Khan would be considered as the first Olympian for Iran. He would compete in the men's individual épée and advance up until the quarterfinals before his elimination in the event.

== Biography ==
Freydoun Malcolm Khan was born on 25 December 1875 in London in the United Kingdom as the fourth child and first son of his family. His father, Mirza Malkam Khan, was a diplomat of Iranian Armenian origin who served as the minister plenipotentiary for Persia in London at the time Freydoun was born. Freydoun would graduated from Eton College and attended the French military academy, the École spéciale militaire de Saint-Cyr. He would later be designated as the special adjutant at the Persian Embassy in Paris and later in Rome.

Due to his and his father's service as a diplomat, they would be granted the royal title of Prince by Mozaffar ad-Din Shah Qajar despite not being related to him. His father would give the Shah a diamond ring to thank him. At the time when Freydoun worked at the Paris Embassy and was still a student in the academy, the Shah would nominate him to compete at the 1900 Summer Olympics in Paris as a fencer. There, he would represent Qajar Iran under the name Persia.

Khan would be considered as the first Olympian for Iran. He would compete in the first round of the men's individual épée for qualification. There, he would compete against five other athletes and placed second to advance further to the quarterfinals. He would again compete against five other athletes but would finish last in his pool, ending his stint and chances at a medal.

Khan would later die on 4 June 1954 in Brighton, United Kingdom, at the age of 78.

== See also ==
- List of royal Olympians
