= Petro Zakovorot =

Russian fencer

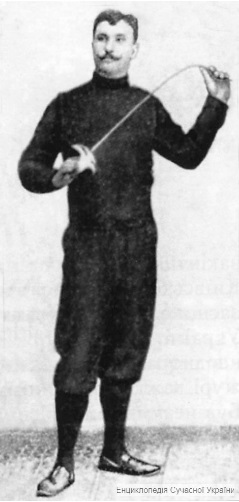

Personal information
- Full name: Petro Antonovych Zakovorot
- Born: 1871 Kup'ievakha, Russian Empire
- Died: 5 March 1951 (aged 79–80) Kharkiv, Ukrainian SSR, Soviet Union

Sport
- Country: Russian Empire
- Sport: Fencing

Achievements and titles
- Olympic finals: 1900 Summer Olympics

Petro Antonovych Zakovorot (Ukrainian: Петро́ Анто́нович Заковоро́т, Russian: Пётр Анто́нович Заковоро́т; 1871 – 5 March 1951) was a Ukrainian fencer. Born in Kup'ievakha village, now the Kharkiv region in Ukraine, he competed in the individual masters sabre event at the 1900 Summer Olympics representing Russia, and finished 7th.

Petro Zakovorot was a student of Julian Michaux.

After the 1900 Olympics, he became an instructor at the Main Gymnastics and Fencing School and the Naval Cadet Corps of Saint Petersburg. From 1918 he was the instructor of the first Soviet gymnastics and fencing courses for command and enlisted personnel of the Red Army.

In 1935 Zakovorot won the title of champion of the Ukrainian SSR among rapiers.
