= Alfons Schöne =

German fencer

Personal information
- Nationality: German

Sport
- Sport: Fencing

Alfons Schöne was a German fencer. He competed in the individual sabre event at the 1900 Summer Olympics.
