= Élie, Count de Lastours =

French fencer

Personal information
- Full name: Élie Marie Gabriel Dor de Lastours
- Born: 12 August 1874 Orgeval, Yvelines, France
- Died: 18 November 1932 (aged 58) Castres, France

Sport
- Sport: Fencing, tennis

Élie Marie Gabriel Dor de Lastours (12 August 1874 – 18 November 1932), also known as Élie, Count de Lastours, was a French fencer, tennis player, and politician. He competed in the individual épée and men's doubles events at the 1900 Summer Olympics.

He was a member of the National Assembly from 16 November 1919 to 31 May 1924. He represented Tarn as a member of the Republican Federation.
