= Milan Neralić =

Croatian fencer

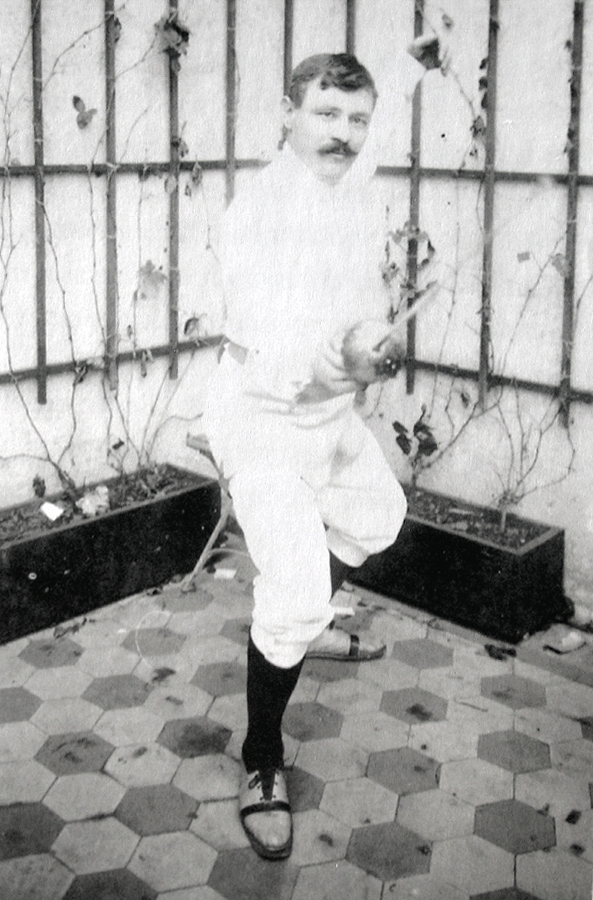
- Milan Neralić

Medal record

Representing Austrian Empire

Men's Fencing

Olympic Games
Bronze medal – third place	1900 Paris	Masters sabre

Milan Neralić (26 February 1875 in Slunj – 17 February 1918 in Vienna) was a Croatian fencer who competed in the late 19th century and early 20th century.

== Biography ==
Born to a Croatian family, he was the first person from Croatia to take part in the Olympic Games and the first one to win a medal. Neralić joined the army in 1893 and in 1895 took part in the Vienna newtown military fencing and gymnastics instructor course. His teachers included Heinrich Tenner and Rudolf Brosch.

He participated in fencing at the 1900 Summer Olympics in Paris and won the bronze medal in the Master's sabre. He was defeated by Italian fencer Italo Santelli in the semi-final.

Neralić spent most of his life in Berlin and Vienna working as fencing instructor. His most notable student was Richard Verderber, winner of the silver (saber team) and bronze (foil) medals at the 1912 Summer Olympics in Stockholm.

On 26 February 2022, Neralić got a statue in his hometown.
