= Ivan, Viscount d'Oyley =

American fencer

Personal information
- Full name: Alastair Ivan Ladislaus Lucidus d'Oyley-Evans
- Born: 2 February 1880
- Died: 26 May 1904 (aged 24) Paris, France

Sport
- Sport: Fencing

Ivan, Viscount d'Oyley, born Alastair Ivan Ladislaus Lucidus Evans, (2 February 1880 – 26 May 1904) was an American who competed for France at the Olympics in fencing. He competed in the individual épée event at the 1900 Summer Olympics. His father, Dr. d'Oyley-Evans, a Paris-based American dentist, bought the title of Marquis from the Pope, later acquiring the titles of Count and Viscount for his sons. Viscount d'Oyley killed himself from a self-inflicted gunshot on 23 May 1904 and died three days later.
