= Léon Thiércelin =

Haitian fencer

Personal information
- Nationality: Haitian
- Born: 1861
- Died: Unknown

Sport
- Sport: Fencing

Léon Thiércelin (born 1861, date of death unknown) was a Haitian fencer. He competed in the individual masters foil and épée events at the 1900 Summer Olympics.
