= Georges Pinault =

French Breton nationalist and Celtic-language scholar (1928–2000)

- Born: 5 March 1928; Saint-Malo, France
- Died: 29 November 2000 (aged 72); Paris, France
- Other name: Goulven Pennaod
- Occupations: Army officer; linguist; political activist
- Known for: Co-author of the reference edition of the Coligny calendar
- Awards: Legion of Honour, Croix de guerre TOE

Georges Pinault (5 March 1928 – 29 November 2000), better known by the Bretonised form of his name Goulven Pennaod, was a French army officer, Breton nationalist and scholar of the Celtic languages. With the archaeologist Paul-Marie Duval he prepared the reference edition of the Coligny calendar, and he published widely on the Breton language. He was at the same time a lifelong militant of the French far right, and moved in the neo-Nazi and racialist fringe of the Breton movement. His appointment at Jean Moulin University Lyon 3 in 1989 was cut short the following year after the press reported his past, and a 2004 commission of inquiry into racism and Holocaust denial at that university, chaired by the historian Henry Rousso, described him as a neo-Nazi.

== Early life and the Second World War ==
Pinault was born in Saint-Malo on 5 March 1928, where his parents kept a shop. He learned Breton in his teens, after attending the local secondary school. As a young man he was drawn into Breton nationalism, and he had belonged to the Jeunes de l'Europe Nouvelle, a youth movement of the Occupation years founded by the writer Marc Augier (Saint-Loup) to encourage enlistment in the SS.

At the end of 1944, still a teenager, he was imprisoned. According to the Breton-studies scholar Francis Favereau, who draws on Pinault's own later account, he was sentenced after the Liberation to national degradation and barred from residing in the five Breton departments, but as a minor he was allowed to board at a lycée in Rennes, where he resumed his studies once he was released in 1945.

== Military career ==
Pinault worked briefly in a Paris bank and then spent about a year in Wales before returning to France. He made his career in the army and served in the colonial campaigns of the 1940s and 1950s. The Rousso report records service in Indochina, Morocco and French Equatorial Africa, together with the award of the Legion of Honour and the Croix de guerre. Favereau states that his Indochina service included the Battle of Dien Bien Phu and that he retired as a senior officer. (Note: The Rousso report describes Pinault as a retired capitaine de marine ('marine captain'), whereas Favereau presents him as an officer who reached senior rank.) In Indochina he served alongside Jean-Marie Le Pen, with whom he remained on friendly terms and for whom he publicly called on Bretons to vote in the 1980s.

== Breton nationalism and the far right ==
Pinault's links with Breton nationalist circles in Paris began in the immediate post-war years and were centred on Ker Vreizh, a Breton club in the city. In 1962 he co-founded and co-edited the review Ar Stourmer with the Basque nationalist poet Jon Mirande and Raymond Gestin. Favereau describes its contents as openly neo-fascist, antisemitic and pro-SS. From 1954 he took part in La Bretagne réelle, the review founded by the pre-war separatist Olier Mordrel.

Pinault became editor-in-chief of Le Devenir européen, a neo-Nazi Breton review launched at Nantes in 1972 by Yves Jeanne, a former Waffen-SS recruiter. He wrote for Europe-Action and then for the GRECE journal Nouvelle École, and with Trystan Mordrelle and Guillaume Faye he co-founded the association Europa Riezel and its review Diaspad. He presented himself as a Druid and took part in the neo-druidic and neo-pagan currents of the milieu, which mixed history with occultism. The Rousso report notes his admiration for the Breton collaborationists of Mordrel's circle.

In a 1973 text in La Bretagne réelle, Pinault recalled his arrival in Paris in 1947 and a meeting in a Celtic bookshop with a Basque nationalist. He described a shared hatred of France, an admiration for Adolf Hitler as the greatest man of the 20th century, and antisemitic and anti-Christian hostility, closing with a pro-SS slogan. When the passage was reproduced in the press in March 1990, it brought his university post to an end.

== Linguistic work ==
Pinault was largely self-taught as a Celticist. He studied Old Breton at the École Pratique des Hautes Études but held no doctorate. With Paul-Marie Duval he prepared the third volume of the Recueil des inscriptions gauloises, published by the CNRS in 1986, which established the text of the Coligny calendar. (Note: The volume names its co-author simply as "Georges Pinault". The Bibliothèque nationale de France authority record identifies him with Pennaod and cautions against confusion with the Indo-Europeanist Georges-Jean Pinault.)

He published a handbook of Middle Breton in 1964 and a long series of linguistic notes and reviews in Breton-language journals such as Al Liamm and Hor Yezh, and he was active in the SADED movement for a standardised modern Breton. He also contributed to Jean Haudry's journal Études indo-européennes. He wrote literary criticism for the paper La Bretagne à Paris under the pen name Fanch Trimer, one of many pseudonyms he used. Favereau connects his Celtic and neo-druidic writing to the racialist outlook of the milieu around Europe-Action.

== Appointment at Lyon 3 ==
In 1988 Pinault applied, with the support of the Indo-Europeanist Jean Haudry, for a post to teach ancient Celtic at Jean Moulin University Lyon 3. His file was thin: his only university qualification was a science certificate from 1962, and his publications amounted to the CNRS edition of the Gaulish inscriptions, articles in Haudry's journal and a few Breton manuals. The relevant specialists' commission, chaired by Bruno Gollnisch and pressed by Haudry, gave repeated favourable opinions, but the ministry blocked an associate professorship on procedural grounds. On 24 October 1989 Pinault was instead appointed an associate lecturer on the university's own establishment, and he taught ancient Celtic during 1989–1990.

The appointment coincided with the Notin affair, which had drawn national attention to Lyon 3. In March 1990 the press revealed Pinault's political past. The mayor of Lyon, Michel Noir, wrote to the education minister Lionel Jospin to protest the recruitment. The rector, Maurice Niveau, judged the appointment irregular because Pinault held no doctorate. On 15 May 1990 the university suspended his doctoral enrolment, and he was not retained beyond the following months.

== Selected works ==
- with Paul-Marie Duval, Recueil des inscriptions gauloises, vol. III: Les calendriers (Coligny, Villards-d'Héria), XLVe supplément à Gallia, Paris, Éditions du CNRS, 1986.
- Dornlevr krennvrezhonek [Handbook of Middle Breton], PREDER, 1964.
