= Camillo Müller =

Austrian fencer

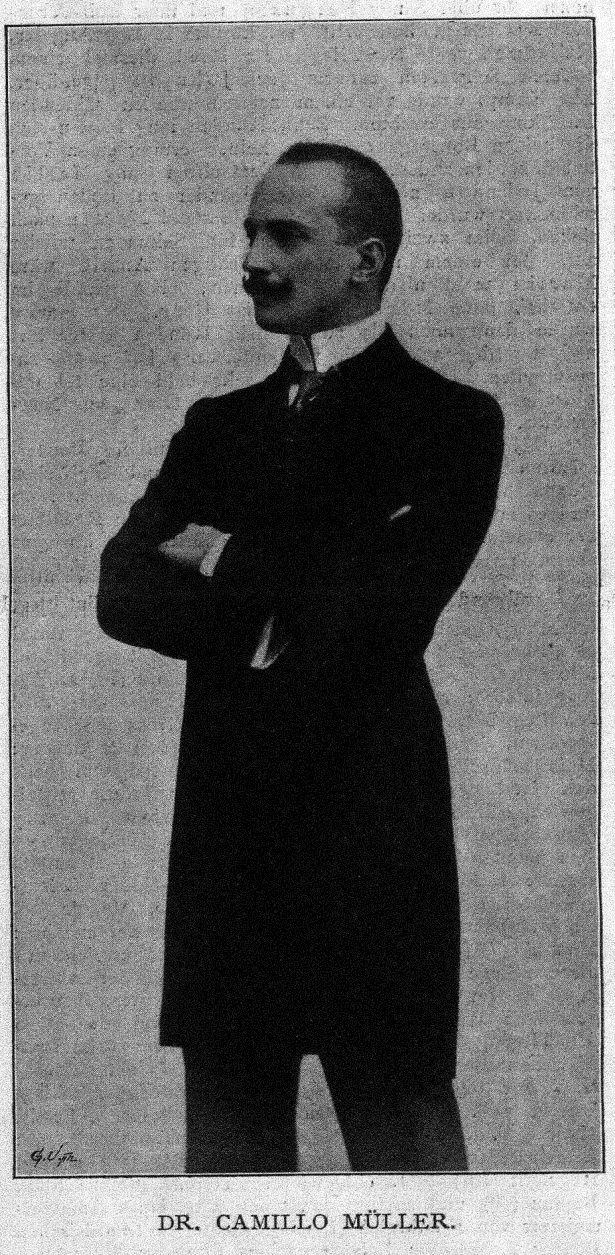

Personal information
- Nationality: Austrian
- Born: 8 January 1870 Vienna, Austria-Hungary
- Died: 28 September 1936 (aged 66) Vienna, Austria

Sport
- Sport: Fencing

Camillo Müller (8 January 1870 – 28 September 1936) was an Austrian sabre fencer who competed in the 1900 Summer Olympics.

In the 1900 sabre competition he reached the final and finished eighth.
