= Willy Sulzbacher =

French fencer

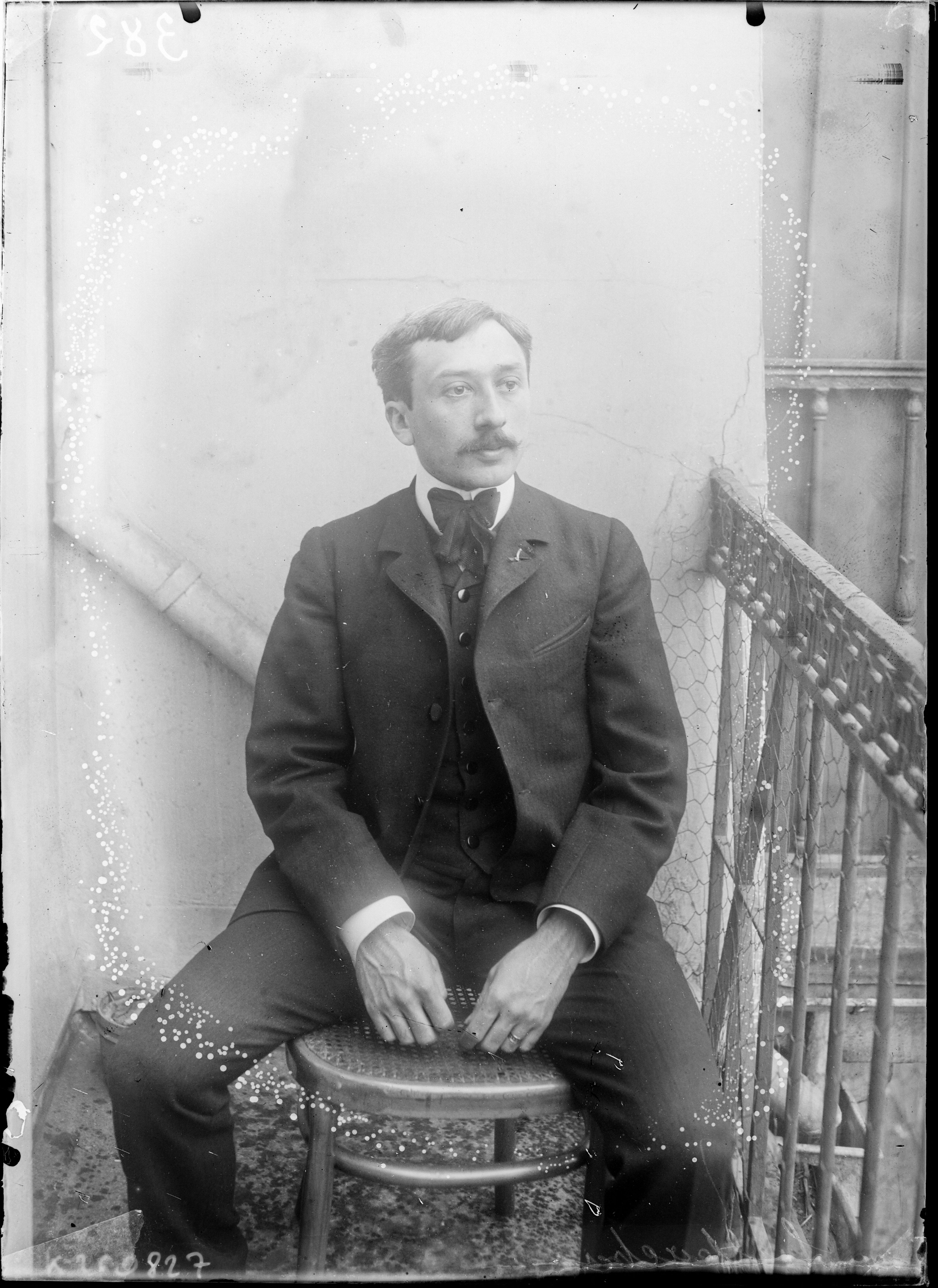

Personal information
- Born: 7 August 1876 Saint-Cloud, France
- Died: 15 August 1908 (aged 32) Paris, France

Sport
- Sport: Fencing

Willy Sulzbacher (7 August 1876 – 15 August 1908) was a French fencer. He competed in the men's épée event at the 1900 Summer Olympics. Some sources, including the IOC athlete database, list him as a German competitor because he was named to the Games by Deutscher und Österreichischer Fechterbund, a German fencing club. He committed suicide by shooting himself in 1908.
