= Henri Laurent =

French fencer (1881–1954)

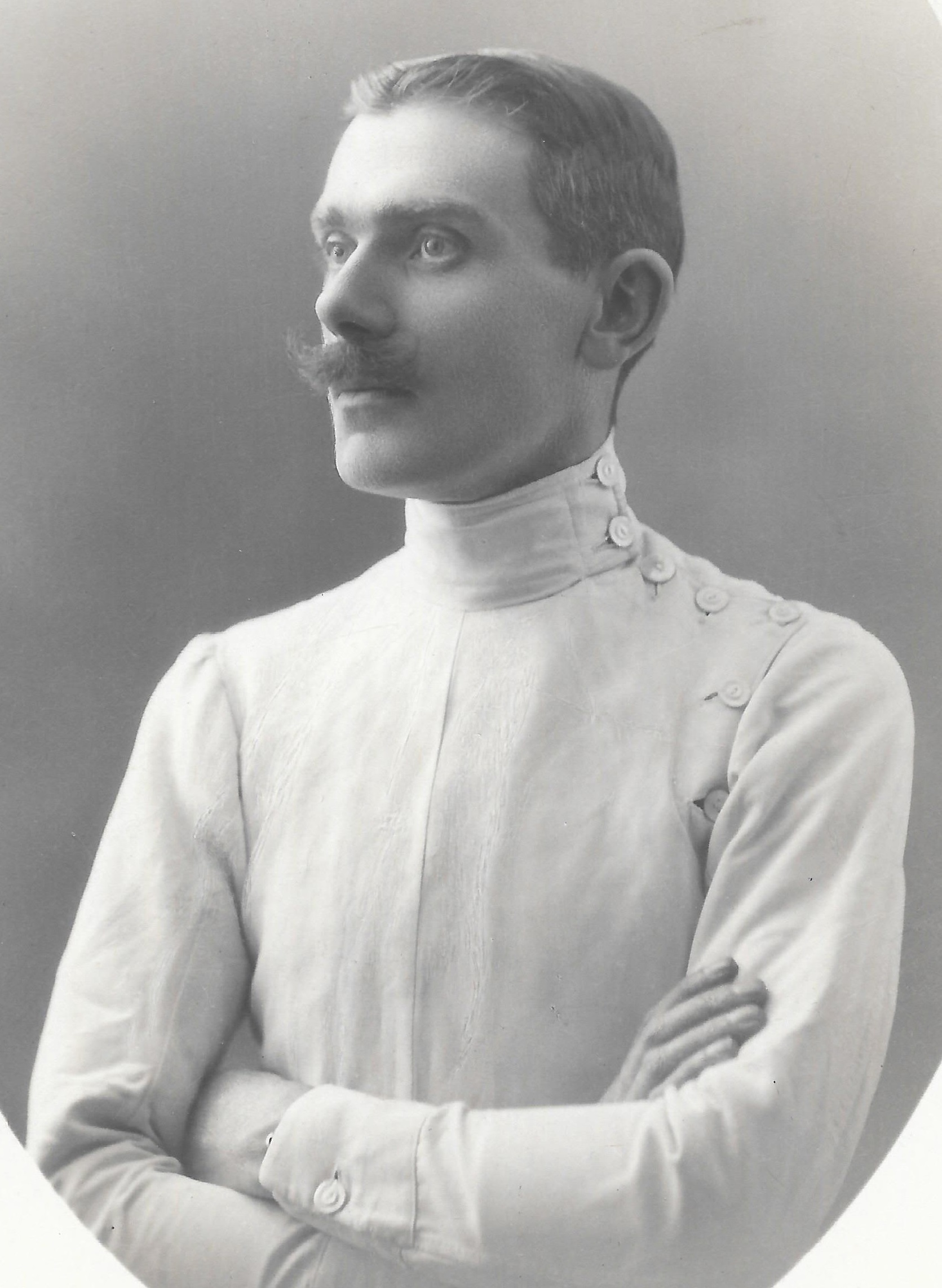

Medal record

Men's fencing
| Bronze medal – third place | 1900 Paris | Masters Épée |

Henri Albert Fernand Laurent (1 April 1881 in Beaulieu-sur-Loire – 14 February 1954 in La Rochelle) was a French fencer who competed in the early 20th century.

He participated in fencing at the 1900 Summer Olympics in Paris and won the bronze medal in the masters épée. He was defeated by fellow French fencer Emile Bougnol in the semi-final.
