= Richard Wallace (fencer) =

French fencer

Personal information
- Full name: Marie Richard Georges Wallace
- Born: 2 May 1872 Paris, France
- Died: 19 January 1941 (aged 68) Arcachon, France

Sport
- Sport: Fencing

Marie Richard Georges Wallace (2 May 1872 – 19 January 1941) was a French fencer. He competed in the individual épée event at the 1900 Summer Olympics. He was the brother of fencer Edmond Wallace.
