= Antonio Conte (fencer) =

Italian fencer (1867-1953)

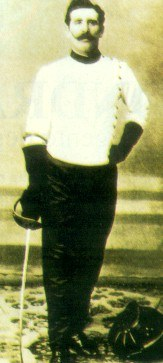

Personal information
- Born: 11 December 1867 Minturno, Kingdom of Italy
- Died: 4 February 1953 (aged 85) Minturno, Kingdom of Italy
Medal record
Men's Fencing
Representing Italy
Olympic Games
Gold medal – first place	1900 Paris	Masters sabre

Antonio Conte (11 December 1867 — 4 February 1953) was an Italian fencer who competed in the late 19th century and early 20th century.

== Biography ==
Conte was born in Minturno. He participated in Fencing at the 1900 Summer Olympics in Paris and won the gold medal in the masters sabre, defeating fellow Italian fencer Italo Santelli in the final.
