= Léon Thiébaut =

French fencer (1880–1956)

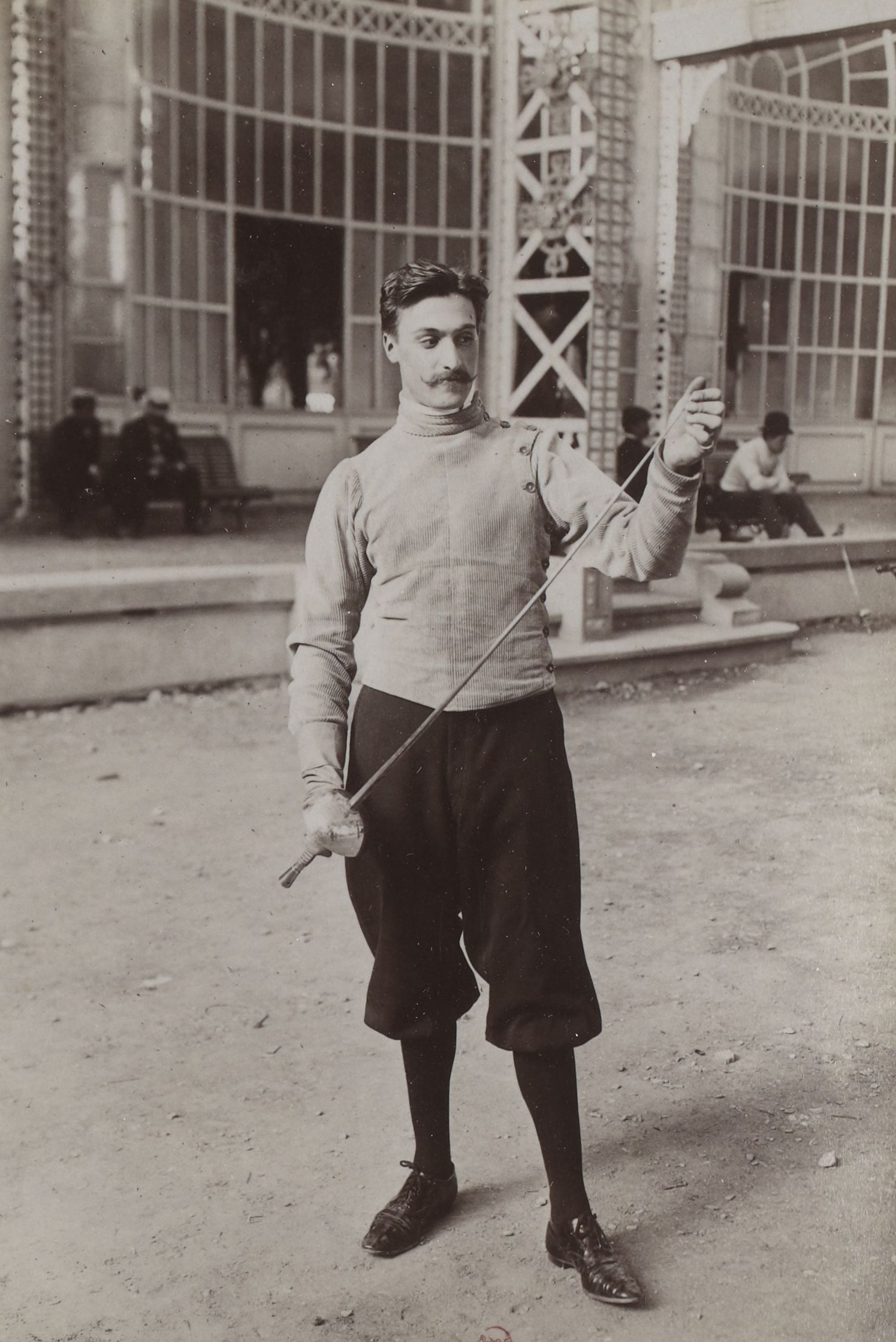
- Léon Thiébaut (1901)

Medal record

Men's Fencing
Silver medal – second place	1900 Paris	Sabre

Henri Léon Thiébaut (19 November 1880 in Paris – 13 October 1956 in Paris) was a French fencer who competed in the late 19th century and early 20th century. He participated in Fencing at the 1900 Summer Olympics in Paris and won the silver medal in the sabre. He was defeated by Georges de la Falaise in the final.
