= József Keresztessy (fencer) =

Hungarian fencer (1819–1895)

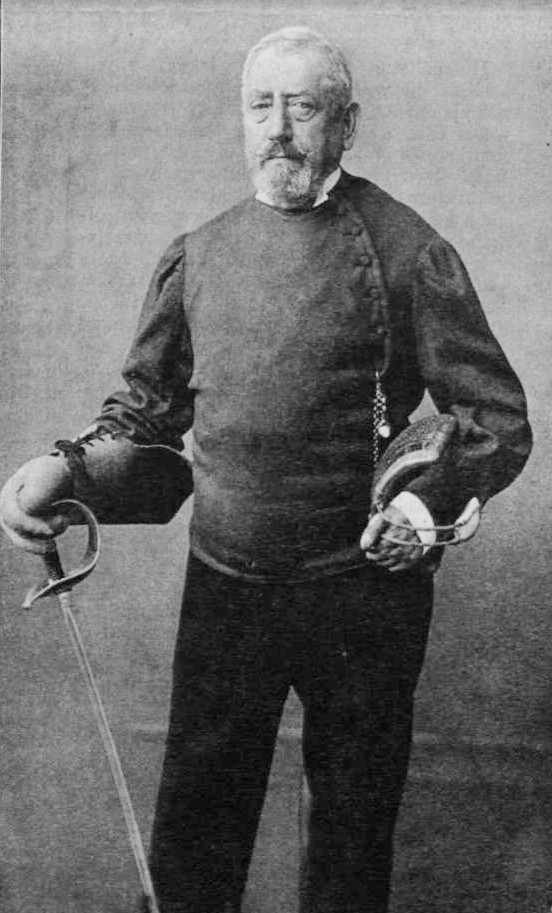
József Keresztessy, around 1892

József Keresztessy (7 August 1819 – 16 April 1895) was a Hungarian fencer. He was the founder of sword fencing in Hungary. His teacher was fencing reformer Luigi Barbasetti.

He was born in Budapest, Hungary. He received a post at the Fencing Institution in Pest under the direction of Ignác Friedrich where he worked as an assistant. After practicing for six years, he obtained a masters diploma in fencing. He then taught at the National Fencing Institute in Budapest. During the Hungarian Revolution he was a member of Lajos Aulich’s company. He took part in the battles of Buda, Pered, and as a soldier of György Klapka, at the Battles of Komárom. His fencing school was opened in 1851.
