= Antonius van Nieuwenhuizen =

Dutch fencer (1879–1957)

Personal information
- Full name: Eugenius Antonius van Nieuwenhuizen
- Born: 3 September 1879 The Hague, Netherlands
- Died: 16 January 1957 (aged 77) The Hague, Netherlands

Sport
- Sport: Fencing

G. C. E. van Nieuwenhuizen or Eugenius Antonius van Nieuwenhuizen (3 September 1879 – 16 January 1957) was a Dutch fencer. He competed in the individual masters épée event at the 1900 Summer Olympics. He was invited in April 1902 by the "Société d'escrime pour l'épée" to compete at teachers championships in Paris. At the 1902 fencing councours in Paris, he won 100 francs and finished outside the top eight.

Van Nieuwenhuizen had the military rank of sergeant major. He was teacher of fencing and gymnastics at the "Normaal Schietschool" in The Hague.
