= Élie de Poliakoff =

Russian equestrian

Personal information
- Nationality: Russian
- Born: 1870 Kharkiv, Russian Empire
- Died: 1942 (aged 71–72)

Sport
- Sport: Equestrian

Élie de Poliakoff (Russian: Илья Лазаревич Поляков) was a Russian-Jewish aristocrat and equestrian, who was regarded "among the best sportsmen in Paris". In May–June 1900, he competed in the equestrian events during the International Horse Show in Paris. The show was part of the Exposition Universelle, and the equestrian events were later classified as part of the 1900 Summer Olympics.

Poliakoff was born in Kharkiv, Russian Empire, in 1870. He had at least five brothers and two sisters. Élie de Poljakow was the son of banker Lazar Polyakov. He lived in Paris and died in 1942.
