= Charles Clappier =

French fencer

Personal information
- Full name: Charles Emile Clappier
- Born: 26 August 1867 Lyon, Second French Empire
- Died: Unknown

Sport
- Sport: Fencing

Charles Emile Clappier (born 26 August 1867, date of death unknown) was a French fencer. He competed in the individual masters épée and sabre events at the 1900 Summer Olympics.
