= Albert Ayat =

French fencer (1875–1935)

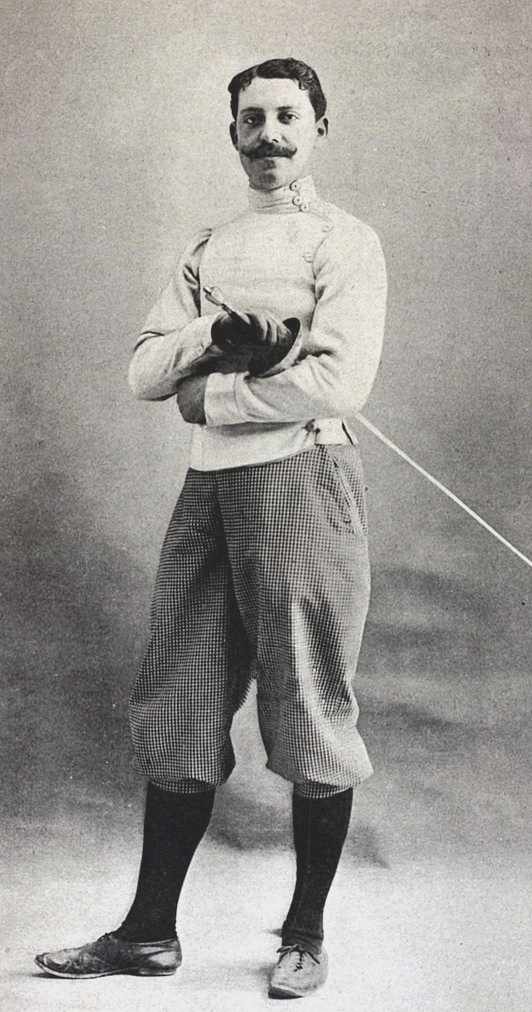
- Albert Ayat in 1900

Personal information
- Born: 7 March 1875 Paris, France
- Died: 2 December 1935 (aged 60) Courbevoie, France

Sport
- Sport: Fencing
- Club: CEA, Paris
Medal record
Men's fencing
Representing France
Olympic Games
Gold medal – first place	1900 Paris	Masters epee
Gold medal – first place	Paris 1900	Amateur masters epee

Albert Jean Louis Ayat (7 March 1875 – 2 December 1935) was a French fencer. He competed at the 1900 Summer Olympics alongside his brother Félix and won gold medals in the masters and amateur masters épée events.
