= Giuseppe Giurato =

Italian fencer

Fencing career
- Sport: Fencing
- Country: Italy

Giuseppe Giurato was an Italian fencer, from Naples. He competed in the individual foil and épée events at the 1900 Summer Olympics.
