= Léon Sée =

French fencer (1877–1960)

Olympic medal record

Men's Fencing
Bronze medal – third place	1900 Paris	Épée
Bronze medal – third place	1900 Paris	Amateur masters épée

Léon Sée (23 September 1877 – 21 March 1960) was a French fencer who competed in the late 19th century and early 20th century. He was born in Lille and died in Paris.

He participated in Fencing at the 1900 Summer Olympics in Paris and won the bronze medal in the épée. He was defeated by fellow French fencer Louis Perrée in the semi-final. He also won the bronze medal in the Amateur masters épée in Paris.
