= Xavier Anchetti =

French fencer

Personal information
- Born: 22 March 1866 Ucciani, Second French Empire
- Died: Unknown

Sport
- Sport: Fencing

Xavier Anchetti (born 22 March 1866, date of death unknown) was a French fencer. He competed in the individual masters foil, sabre and épée events at the 1900 Summer Olympics.
