= Henri Hébrard de Villeneuve =

French fencer (1848–1925)

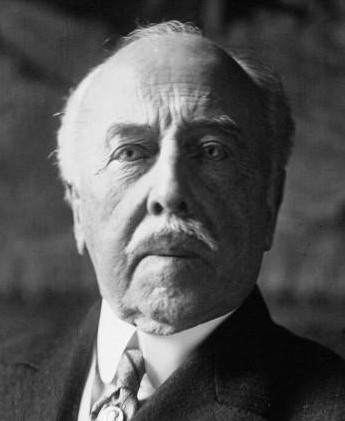

Personal information
- Born: 10 September 1848; Riom, Puy-de-Dôme, Second French Empire
- Died: 22 March 1925 (aged 76); Paris, France

Sport
- Sport: Fencing

Henri Hébrard de Villeneuve (10 September 1848 – 22 March 1925) was a French fencer. He competed in the individual épée event at the 1900 Summer Olympics.
