= Siegfried Flesch =

Austrian fencer

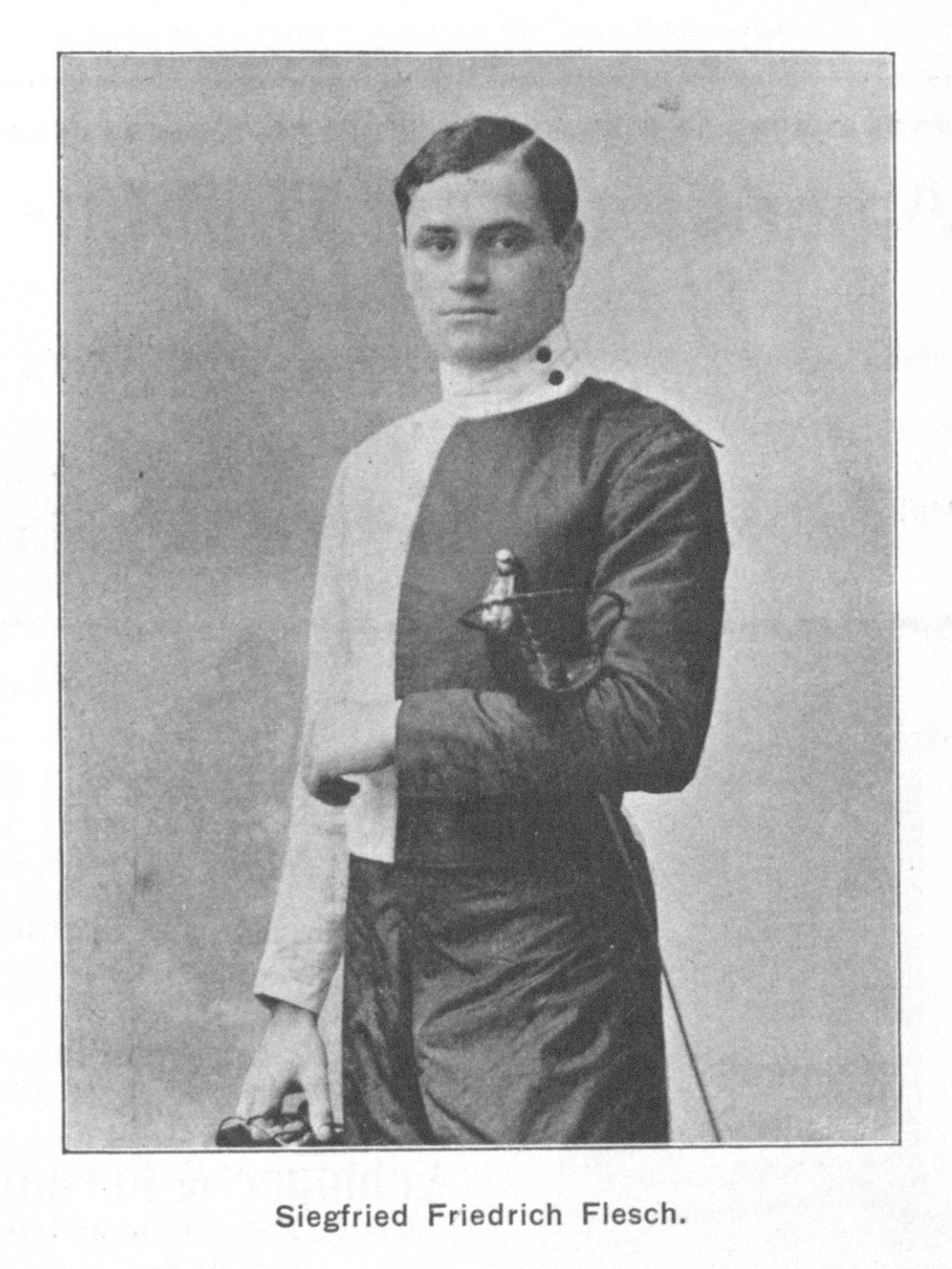
- Flesch in 1902

Medal record

Men's fencing

Representing Austrian Empire

Olympic Games
Bronze medal – third place	1900 Paris	Sabre

Siegfried Friedrich "Fritz" Flesch (11 March 1872 – 11 August 1939) was an Austrian sabre fencer who competed during the late 19th century and early 20th century.

== Olympic fencing career ==
Born in Brno, Flesch was 27 years old when he came second in the Austrian sabre championships in 1899, the next year he competed for Austria at the 1900 Summer Olympics in Paris, in the first round of the sabre event he was one of the sixteen fencers to qualify to the next round, there he finished third out of a group of eight fencers so qualified for the final pool. In the final pool of eight fencers Flesch won four of his seven matches to finish in third place for the bronze medal, thus becoming the first Jewish fencer to win an Olympic medal.

He returned to Olympic competition at the 1908 Summer Olympics in London, now aged 36 years old he again participated in the sabre event. In his first round he won his pool after winning all five match ups, however in the second pool of matches he could only win one against the other four fencers in his pool so was eliminated and was ranked 24th overall in the event.

== Personal life ==
Flesch was Jewish.

== See also ==
- List of select Jewish fencers
- List of Jewish Olympic medalists
- List of Jewish Olympic medalists
