= Edmond Wallace =

French fencer

Personal information
- Full name: Edmond Georges Richard Wallace
- Born: 4 October 1876 Saint-Maur-des-Fossés, France
- Died: 28 February 1915 (aged 38) Paris, France

Sport
- Sport: Fencing

Edmond Georges Richard Wallace (4 October 1876 – 28 February 1915) was a French fencer. He competed in the individual épée event at the 1900 Summer Olympics. He was killed in action during World War I. He was the brother of fencer Richard Wallace.

== See also ==
- List of Olympians killed in World War I
