= Italo Santelli =

Italian fencer

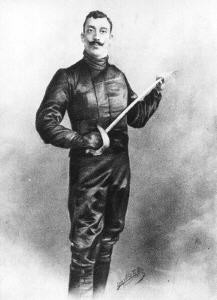

Personal information
- Born: 15 August 1866 Carrodano (La Spezia), Italy
- Died: 8 February 1945 (aged 78) Livorno, Italy
Medal record
Fencing
Representing Italy
Olympic Games
Silver medal – second place	1900 Paris	Masters sabre

Italo Santelli (15 August 1866 – 8 February 1945) was an Italian fencer who is considered to be the "father of modern sabre fencing".

== Biography ==
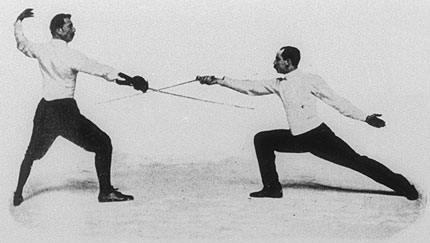
Santelli (left) at the 1900 Summer Olympics, fencing foil against Jean-Baptiste Mimiague

Italo Santelli was born in Carrodano (La Spezia), Italy in 1866. He studied at famous Italian schools, including the Scuola Magistrale of Rome (Scuola Magistrale Militare di Roma), where he graduated in 1889. In 1896 Santelli was considered an established fencing master, and Santelli moved to Budapest together with brother Otello, also a fencer, and his wife. Santelli had his son, Giorgio, in Hungary in 1897, who always kept his Italian citizenship, before leaving for the USA.

It was in Hungary that Italo Santelli began to create a new style of sabre fencing. The style involved a much more quick defense than classical training called for, and became known as the "modern style" of Santelli.

Santelli displayed this modern style at the 1900 Summer Olympics in Paris on the Italian team. He came in 6th at the foil competition, but took home a silver medal in sabre, his teammate Antonio Conte taking the gold. He later coached George Worth, born György Woittitz, the Hungarian-born American Olympic medalist fencer, in Budapest.

== Post-Olympics ==
At the 1924 Summer Olympics, Kovács, a Hungarian judge, made a controversial call in a fencing match, siding with France over Italy. An Italian fencer, Aldo Boni, verbally attacked the judge for the ruling and refused to apologize when asked. Santelli was called in as a witness to Boni's outbreak, and the Italian team was forced to resign from the competition.

Once in Italy, Adolfo Cotronei, a writer and journalist from Naples, who worked for Italian papers such as Paese, Pungolo, Don Marzio, Mattino, Corriere della Sera and Gazzetta dello Sport accused Italo Santelli of speaking out against Boni to remove him from the competition, supposedly fearing they would eliminate his adopted nation of Hungary, who would go on to take the bronze at the 1924 Games. In one of his writings, the journalist made remarks wholly detrimental to Santelli. So, he was challenged to a duel by Italo Santelli's son, Giorgio. Under the rules of the "code duello", Giorgio Santelli defended his father's honor and won the duel by delivering a blow to Cotronei's cheek, severing a nerve under his left eye (Cotronei's eye was irreparably damaged during that Summer). The challenge took place on 28 August 1924, when Giorgio Santelli was a skilled 27-year-old fencer, while his opponent was just a circa 46-year-old man of letters. Santelli and Cotronei met again and made their peace eight years later, at the 1932 Games in Los Angeles. Italo Santelli went on to coach numerous notable fencing students over the course of his career.

Italo Santelli died on 8 February 1945, at the age of 78, in Livorno, Italy.
