= Maurice Boisdon =

French fencer

Personal information
- Born: 22 March 1855 La Rochelle, Second French Empire
- Died: 24 October 1928 (aged 73) Paris, France

Sport
- Sport: Fencing

Maurice Eugène Boisdon (22 March 1855 – 24 October 1928) was a French fencer. He competed in the individual sabre and épée events at the 1900 Summer Olympics.
