= Julian Michaux =

Russian fencer

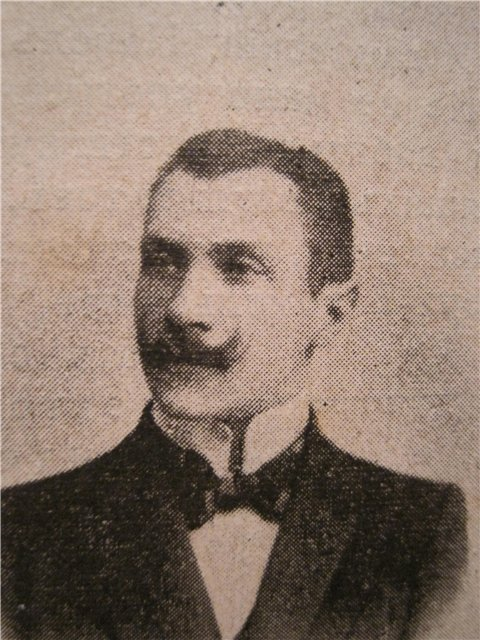

Personal information
- Full name: Julian Eligiusz Aleksandrovich Michaux, Юлиан Александрович Александрович Мишо
- Nationality: Polish
- Born: 1 December 1867 Warsaw, Congress Poland, Russian Empire
- Died: 11 December 1925 (aged 58) Warsaw, Second Polish Republic

Sport
- Country: Russian Empire
- Sport: Fencing

Achievements and titles
- Olympic finals: 1900 Summer Olympics

Julian Eligiusz Aleksandrovich Michaux (Russian: Юлиан Александрович Александрович Мишо, 1 December 1867 – 11 December 1925), born in Warsaw, Congress Poland, was a polish fencer. He competed in the individual masters sabre event at the 1900 Summer Olympics where he finished 5th. His great-grandfather in the beginning of the 19th century came from Liège, now part of Belgium, to Warsaw - thus the French family name.
