= Gilbert Bougnol =

French fencer (1866–1947)

Olympic medal record

Men's Fencing
Silver medal – second place	1900 Paris	Masters Épée

Gilbert or Émile Bougnol (31 August 1866 in Saint-Myon, France – 20 October 1947 in Rueil-Malmaison, France) was a French professional fencer who competed in the late 19th century and early 20th century. He participated in Fencing at the 1900 Summer Olympics in Paris and won the silver medal in the masters épée.
