= Georges de la Falaise =

French fencer (1866–1910)

Louis de La Falaise
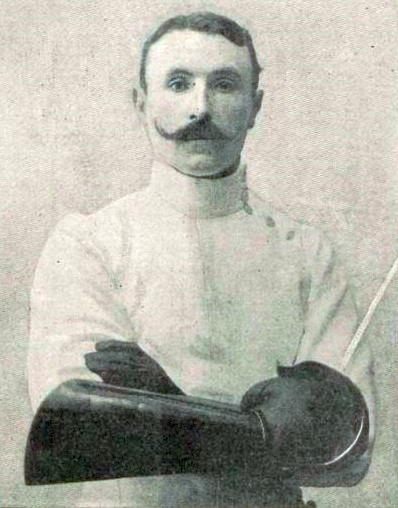
- de La Falaise in 1900

Medal record

Men's fencing

Representing France

Olympic Games
Gold medal – first place	1900 Paris	Sabre

Intercalated Games
Gold medal – first place	1906 Athens	Épée
Gold medal – first place	1906 Athens	Team épée

Louis Venant Gabriel Le Bailly de La Falaise (24 March 1866 in Luçon – 8 April 1910 in Paris) was a French fencer. He participated in Fencing at the 1900 Summer Olympics in Paris and won the gold medal in the sabre, defeating fellow French fencer Henri Masson in the final. He also participated in Fencing at the 1908 Summer Olympics but was beaten in the final round, finishing in last place.

By his wife, the former Henriette Hennessy, he had four children:

- Louise Le Bailly de La Falaise, (1894-1910)
- James Henry Le Bailly de La Falaise, 1898–1972), who married American movie stars Gloria Swanson and Constance Bennett
- Alain Le Bailly de La Falaise, (1905–1977), first husband of model Maxime de la Falaise and father of fashion muse/designer Loulou de la Falaise
- Richard Le Bailly de La Falaise, (1910–1945)
