= Louis Perrée =

French fencer (1871–1924)

Olympic medal record

Men's Fencing
Silver medal – second place	1900 Paris	Epee

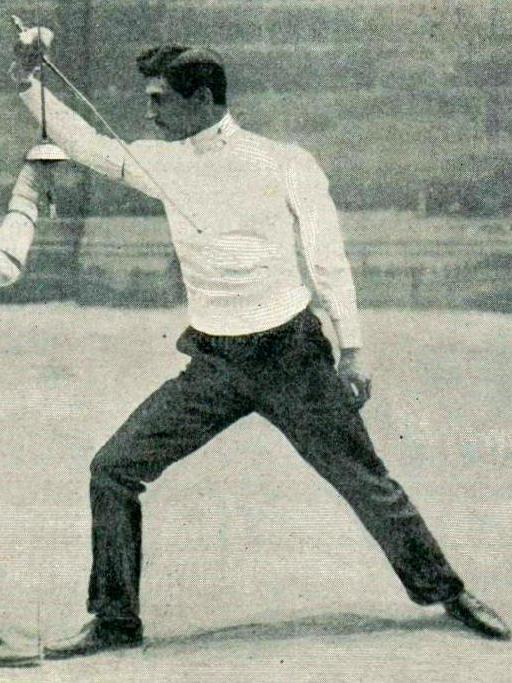
Louis Perrée (1900)

Louis Léonce Théophile Perrée (25 March 1871 in Paris – 1 March 1924 in Ivry-la-Bataille) was a French fencer who competed in the late 19th century and early 20th century. He participated in Fencing at the 1900 Summer Olympics in Paris and won the silver medal in the epee. He was defeated by Ramón Fonst in the final.
