= Luigi Barbasetti =

Italian fencer

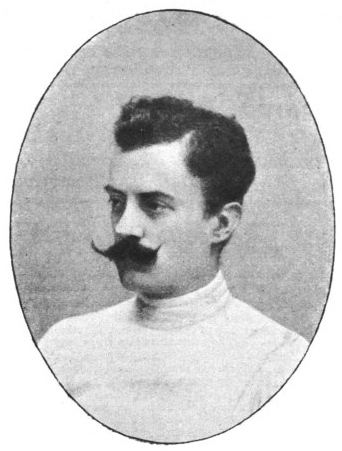
Luigi Barbasetti (1900)

Luigi Barbasetti (21 February 1859 in Cividale del Friuli – 31 March 1948 in Verona) was an Italian fencing master and reformer. His teacher was fencing master Giuseppe Radaelli, who trained him to be a "military master of arms". Barbasetti's second teacher was fencing master Masaniello Parise from the Masters School in Rome. After training he taught at the Masters School in Rome. He became a fencing master of Triest before he was called to Vienna. In the fall of 1894 Barbasetti arrived in Vienna. Under the patronage of Archduke Franz Salvator, he played a leading role in the reform of the sport of fencing in Vienna in 1895 by making the modern Italian fencing method accessible to the German-speaking area. In 1895 he founded the fencing school "Union Fechtklub Wien" that still exists today. He developed a Hungarian style of saber technique, which dominated saber fencing for the first half of the twentieth century and trained the Hungarian master József Keresztessy also called “father of Hungarian sabre fencing.” In 1915 Barbasetti had to leave Germany because Italy took part in the war against Germany. He returned to Italy until he moved to Paris in 1921, where he taught at the Automobile Club and the Golfers Club. He returned again to Italy in 1943 and died in Verona on March 31, 1948.

== Writings (selection) ==
- The Art of the Foil. 1932. reprint 1998. ISBN 0-76070943-2
- The Art of the Sabre and the Epee. 1936. reprint 2019. ISBN 9783964010056
