= Fencing at the 1900 Summer Olympics – Men's foil =

Men's foil at the Games of the II Olympiad
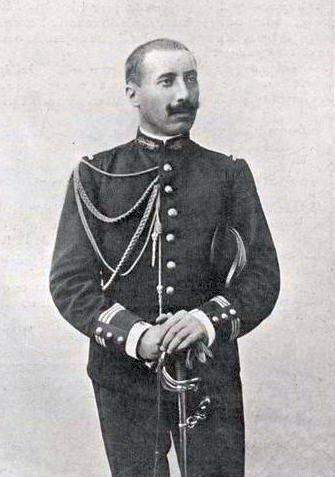
- Émile Coste
- Venue: Tuileries Garden
- Dates: 14–21 May
- Competitors: 54 from 10 nations

Medalists
1st place, gold medalist(s)		Émile Coste	France
2nd place, silver medalist(s)		Henri Masson	France
3rd place, bronze medalist(s)		Marcel Boulenger	France

The amateur foil competition had 54 fencers from 10 nations compete. There was no limit on the number of fencers per nation; 39 of the 54 competitors were French. For the first round, quarterfinals, and repechage, skill and art with the foil was more important to advancing than winning the bout. The event was swept by French fencers: Émile Coste, Henri Masson, and Marcel Boulenger took the top three places. It was the second consecutive Games that France had taken the top two ranks in the event.

== Background ==
This was the second appearance of the event, which has been held at every Summer Olympics except 1908 (when there was a foil display only rather than a medal event). None of the fencers from 1896 returned.

Nine of the ten competing nations were making their debut in the men's foil: Austria, Belgium, Haiti, Italy, Peru, Spain, Sweden, Switzerland, and the United States. Only France had previously competed in 1896.

== Competition format ==
The event used a five-round format (four main rounds and a repechage). For the first three rounds (round 1, quarterfinals, repechage) the round consisted of the fencers being paired and fighting a single bout; jury evaluations of skill rather than the match results were used to determine advancement. The last two rounds (semifinals and finals) used round-robin pool play with actual results counting toward placement. Standard foil rules were used, including that touches had to be made with the tip of the foil, the target area was limited to the torso, and priority determined the winner of double touches.

- Round 1: The 54 fencers paired off and faced a single opponent in one bout. The jury selected 37 fencers to advance to the quarterfinals.
- Quarterfinals: The 37 fencers were paired off again, with one fencer having no opponent. Three men withdrew, cancelling one bout altogether and resulting in one fencer fencing twice. The jury selected 10 fencers for the semifinals and 14 more for the repechage.
- Repechage: The 14 fencers selected from the quarterfinals were paired. The jury selected 6 of them to advance. When one qualified fencer withdrew, a 7th fencer was advanced from the repechage.
- Semifinals: The 16 fencers from the quarterfinals and repechage were divided into two pools of 8 fencers each. Each pool played a round robin. The top four fencers in each semifinal pool advanced to the final, while the bottom four fencers went to a classification 9–16 final.
- Finals: There was a main final (top 4 from each semifinal) and a classification 9–16 final (bottom 4 from each semifinal). Each was conducted as a round-robin.

== Schedule ==
Date	Time	Round
Monday, 14 May 1900		Round 1 bouts 1–18
Tuesday, 15 May 1900		Round 1 bouts 19–27
Wednesday, 16 May 1900		Quarterfinals
Thursday, 17 May 1900		Repechage
Friday, 18 May 1900		Semifinals
Saturday, 19 May 1900		Semifinals continued
Monday, 21 May 1900	10:00	Finals

== Results ==
=== Round 1 ===
Each fencer had one bout. The result of the bout did not determine advancement; a jury determined which fencers displayed the most skill. The winner of each bout is unknown. 37 fencers advanced to the quarterfinals. Bouts 1 through 18 were held on 14 May; bouts 19 through 27 were held on 15 May.

Bout	Fencer 1	Nation 1	Notes 1	Fencer 2	Nation 2	Notes 2
1	Mauricio, 4th Duke of Gor	Spain	Q	Félix Debax	France	Q
2	Georges Dillon-Kavanagh	France	Q	Paul Robert	Switzerland	Q
3	Carlos de Candamo	Peru	Q	Albert Cahen	France	Q
4	Henri Masson	France	Q	Olivier Collarini	Italy	Q
5	Robert Marc	France	Q	G. Bélot	France	Q
6	Martini	France	Q	Henri Jobier	France	Q
7	Tony Smet	Belgium	Q	Charles Guérin	France	Q
8	Ferrand	France	Q	Joseph Sénat	France	Q
9	Jean Taillefer	France	Q	Grossard	France	
10	Calvet	France	Q	Emil Fick	Sweden	
11	Adrien Guyon	France	Q	Palardi	Italy	
12	Jactel	France	Q	Giuseppe Giurato	Italy	
13	Clément de Boissière	France	Q	Gardiès	France	
14	Léon Thiébaut	France	Q	F. Weill	United States	
15	Giunio Fedreghini	Italy		Piot	France	
16	Heinrich Rischtoff	Austria		Pélabon	France	
17	Jean Weill	Switzerland		Passerat	France	
18	André Corvington	Haiti		Édouard Fouchier	France	
19	Pierre Georges Louis d'Hugues	France	Q	Émile Coste	France	Q
20	Rudolf Brosch	Austria	Q	Marcel Boulenger	France	Q
21	H. Valarche	France	Q	de Saint-Aignan	France	Q
22	Henri Plommet	France	Q	van der Stoppen	Austria	Q
23	Raphaël Perrissoud	France	Q	Frédéric Soudois	France	Q
24	Joseph Ducrot	France	Q	Albert Gauthier	France	
25	André de Schonen	France	Q	Paul Leroy	France	
26	Jean-Joseph Renaud	France	Q	Eugène Bergès	France	Q
27	Wattelier	France	Q	Herman Georges Berger	France	

=== Quarterfinals ===
Again, jury verdicts were used in place of match results to determine those advancing to the semifinals. 10 fencers were selected to advance to the semifinals directly, while 14 were sent to the repechage. Three fencers withdrew. Cahan fenced twice, while Sénat did not fence at all.

Bout	Fencer 1	Nation 1	Notes 1	Fencer 2	Nation 2	Notes 2
1	Jean-Joseph Renaud	France	Q	Félix Debax	France	Q
2	Clément de Boissière	France	Q	Adrien Guyon	France	Q
3	Henri Masson	France	Q	Carlos de Candamo	Peru	R
4	Tony Smet	Belgium	Q	de Saint-Aignan	France	R
5	Charles Guérin	France	Q	Eugène Bergès	France	R
6	André de Schonen	France	R	Henri Plommet	France	R
7	Émile Coste	France	Q	Paul Robert	Switzerland	
8	Marcel Boulenger	France	Q	Albert Cahen	France	
9	Joseph Ducrot	France	Q	Jactel	France	
10	Georges Dillon-Kavanagh	France	R	Raphaël Perrissoud	France	
11	Rudolf Brosch	Austria	R	H. Valarche	France	
12	G. Bélot	France	R	Calvet	France	
13	Ferrand	France	R	Robert Marc	France	
14	Jean Taillefer	France	R	Martini	France	
15	Léon Thiébaut	France	R	Mauricio, 4th Duke of Gor	Spain	
16	Henri Jobier	France	R	Olivier Collarini	Italy	
17	Pierre Georges Louis d'Hugues	France	R	Albert Cahen	France	
18	Joseph Sénat	France	R	Walkover		
—	Soudois	France		Did not start		
—	van der Stoppen	Austria		Did not start		
—	Wattelier	France		Did not start		

=== Repechage ===
The matchups in the repechage are not known. Once again, jury verdicts rather than match results mattered. 6 fencers were selected to advance to the semifinals. De Saint-Agnan was selected as an alternate, later competing in the consolation final after the withdrawal of Renaud.

Fencer	Nation	Notes
G. Bélot	France	Q
Eugène Bergès	France	Q
Rudolf Brosch	Austria	Q
Georges Dillon-Kavanagh	France	Q
Pierre Georges Louis d'Hugues	France	Q
Joseph Sénat	France	Q
de Saint-Aignan	France	q
Carlos de Candamo	Peru	
Ferrand	France	
Henri Jobier	France	
Henri Plommet	France	
André de Schonen	France	
Jean Taillefer	France	
Léon Thiébaut	France	

=== Semifinals ===
The semifinals were the first round of the foil tournament to use match results in determining advancement. The 16 fencers were divided into two pools. Each fencer then faced each other fencer in his pool once. The four fencers with the best record in each pool moved on to the finals, with the other four competing in the consolation. A barrage was used to break a tie between 4th and 5th place.

==== Semifinal A ====
Rank	Fencer	Nation	Wins	Losses	Notes
1	Émile Coste	France	7	0	Q
2	Henri Masson	France	5	2	Q
3	Joseph Sénat	France	5	2	Q
4	Rudolf Brosch	Austria	3	4	Q
5	Charles Guérin	France	3	4	C
6	Clément de Boissière	France	2	5	C
7	G. Bélot	France	2	5	C
8	Tony Smet	Belgium	1	6	C

==== Semifinal B ====
The win–loss record of fencers in this semifinal is not known.

Rank	Fencer	Nation	Notes
1	Marcel Boulenger	France	Q
2	Félix Debax	France	Q
3	Pierre Georges Louis d'Hugues	France	Q
4	Georges Dillon-Kavanagh	France	Q
5	Jean-Joseph Renaud	France	C
6	Adrien Guyon	France	C
7	Joseph Ducrot	France	C
8	Eugène Bergès	France	C

=== Finals ===
==== Classification 9–16 ====
The eight fencers who had placed in the bottom four of each pool in the semifinals competed for 9th to 16th places in the consolation pool. Renaud withdrew, making room for de Saint-Aignan to be activated from alternate status. The win–loss record of fencers in this pool is not known.

Rank	Fencer	Nation
9	Clément de Boissière	France
10	Eugène Bergès	France
11	de Saint-Aignan	France
12	G. Bélot	France
13	Joseph Ducrot	France
14	Tony Smet	Belgium
15	Adrien Guyon	France
16	Charles Guérin	France

==== Final ====
The final was held on 21 May 1900. The top four fencers in each of the two semifinals competed against each other, each fencing the other seven once.

Rank	Fencer	Nation	Wins	Losses
1st place, gold medalist(s)	Émile Coste	France	6	1
2nd place, silver medalist(s)	Henri Masson	France	5	2
3rd place, bronze medalist(s)	Marcel Boulenger	France	4	3
4	Félix Debax	France	4	3
5	Pierre Georges Louis d'Hugues	France	3	4
6	Joseph Sénat	France	3	4
7	Georges Dillon-Kavanagh	France	2	5
8	Rudolf Brosch	Austria	1	6

== Final classification ==
Rank	Fencer	Nation	Notes
1st place, gold medalist(s)	Émile Coste	France	Final
2nd place, silver medalist(s)	Henri Masson	France	Final
3rd place, bronze medalist(s)	Marcel Boulenger	France	Final
4	Félix Debax	France	Final
5	Pierre Georges Louis d'Hugues	France	Final
6	Joseph Sénat	France	Final
7	Georges Dillon-Kavanagh	France	Final
8	Rudolf Brosch	Austria	Final
9	Clément de Boissière	France	Classification 9–16
10	Eugène Bergès	France	Classification 9–16
11	de Saint-Aignan	France	Classification 9–16
12	G. Bélot	France	Classification 9–16
13	Joseph Ducrot	France	Classification 9–16
14	Tony Smet	Belgium	Classification 9–16
15	Adrien Guyon	France	Classification 9–16
16	Charles Guérin	France	Classification 9–16
17	Jean-Joseph Renaud	France	Withdrew before semifinals
18	Carlos de Candamo	Peru	Repechage
18	Ferrand	France	Repechage
18	Henri Jobier	France	Repechage
18	Henri Plommet	France	Repechage
18	André de Schonen	France	Repechage
18	Jean Taillefer	France	Repechage
18	Léon Thiébaut	France	Repechage
25	Paul Robert	Switzerland	Quarterfinals
25	Albert Cahen	France	Quarterfinals
25	Jactel	France	Quarterfinals
25	Raphaël Perrissoud	France	Quarterfinals
25	H. Valarche	France	Quarterfinals
25	Calvet	France	Quarterfinals
25	Robert Marc	France	Quarterfinals
25	Martini	France	Quarterfinals
25	Mauricio, 4th Duke of Gor	Spain	Quarterfinals
25	Olivier Collarini	Italy	Quarterfinals
35	Soudois	France	Withdrew before quarterfinals
35	van der Stoppen	Austria	Withdrew before quarterfinals
35	Wattelier	France	Withdrew before quarterfinals
38	Grossard	France	Round 1
38	Emil Fick	Sweden	Round 1
38	Palardi	Italy	Round 1
38	Giuseppe Giurato	Italy	Round 1
38	Gardiès	France	Round 1
38	F. Weill	United States	Round 1
38	Giunio Fedreghini	Italy	Round 1
38	Piot	France	Round 1
38	Heinrich Rischtoff	Austria	Round 1
38	Pélabon	France	Round 1
38	Jean Weill	Switzerland	Round 1
38	Passerat	France	Round 1
38	André Corvington	Haiti	Round 1
38	Édouard Fouchier	France	Round 1
38	Albert Gauthier	France	Round 1
38	Paul Leroy	France	Round 1
38	Herman Georges Berger	France	Round 1
