= Fencing at the 1900 Summer Olympics – Men's masters foil =

Men's masters foil at the Games of the II Olympiad
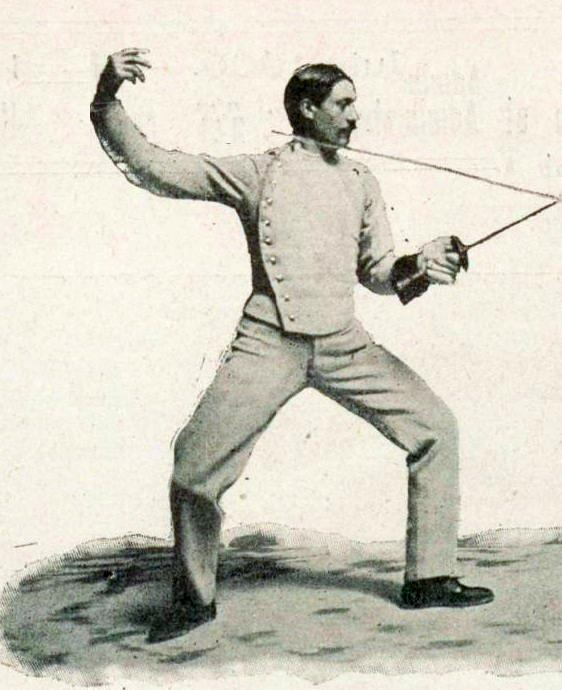
- Lucien Mérignac
- Venue: Tuileries Garden
- Date: 22–29 May
- Competitors: 61 from 7 nations

Medalists
1st place, gold medalist(s)		Lucien Mérignac; France
2nd place, silver medalist(s)		Alphonse Kirchhoffer; France
3rd place, bronze medalist(s)		Jean-Baptiste Mimiague; France

The foil event for professionals involved 61 fencers from 7 nations. It was held from 22 to 29 May. The event as won by Lucien Mérignac, as France swept the top three places. Alphonse Kirchhoffer and Jean-Baptiste Mimiague were second and third, respectively.

== Background ==
This was the second and final appearance of the event. Fencing masters were an exception to the amateurs-only nature of the early Olympics. Masters fencing was held as an Olympic event in 1896 (men's foil only) and 1900 (all three weapons for men, as well as a special event in épée that pitted the top professionals against the top amateurs). By 1904, only amateur events were conducted.

== Competition format ==
The event used a five-round format (four main rounds and a repechage). For the first three rounds (round 1, quarterfinals, repechage) the round consisted of the fencers being paired and fighting a single bout; jury evaluations of skill rather than the match results were used to determine advancement. The last two rounds (semifinals and finals) used round-robin pool play with actual results counting toward placement. Standard foil rules were used, including that touches had to be made with the tip of the foil, the target area was limited to the torso, and priority determined the winner of double touches.

- Round 1: The 61 fencers paired off and faced a single opponent in one bout. The jury selected 45 fencers to advance to the quarterfinals.
- Quarterfinals: The 45 fencers were paired off again. The jury selected 10 fencers for the semifinals. All the rest went to the repechage.
- Repechage: The 35 fencers were paired. The jury selected 6 of them to advance.
- Semifinals: The 16 fencers from the quarterfinals and repechage were divided into two pools of 8 fencers each. Each pool played a round robin. The top four fencers in each semifinal pool advanced to the final, while the bottom four fencers went to a classification 9–16 final.
- Finals: There was a main final (top 4 from each semifinal) and a classification 9–16 final (bottom 4 from each semifinal). Each was conducted as a round-robin.

== Schedule ==
Date	Time	Round
Tuesday, 22 May 1900		Round 1
Wednesday, 23 May 1900		Round 1 continued
Thursday, 24 May 1900		Quarterfinals
Friday, 25 May 1900		Repechage
Sunday, 27 May 1900		Semifinals
Monday, 28 May 1900		Semifinals continued
Tuesday, 29 May 1900		Finals

== Results ==
=== Round 1 ===
Held on 22 May and 23 May, the masters foil used jury verdicts on art and skill in the bout rather than winning or losing to advance to the second round.

Fencer	Nation	Notes
Xavier Anchetti	France	Q
Alexandre Bergès	France	Q
Michel Bettenfeld	France	Q
Bormel	France	Q
Jean-Marie Borringes	France	Q
Marcel Boulenger	France	Q
Jean Boulège	France	Q
J. Brassard	France	Q
Brau	France	Q
Cannesson	France	Q
Paul Carrichon	France	Q
Antonio Conte	Italy	Q
François Delibes	France	Q
Dizier	France	Q
Michel Filippi	France	Q
Joseph Fontaine	France	Q
Louis Gauthier	France	Q
Louis Haller	France	Q
Alphonse Kirchhoffer	France	Q
Ludovic Laborderie	France	Q
Jules Large	France	Q
Lucien Largé	France	Q
Georges Lefèvre	France	Q
Adjutant Lemoine	France	Q
Charles Marty	France	Q
Lucien Mérignac	France	Q
Joseph-Auguste Métais	France	Q
Lucien Millet	France	Q
Jean-Baptiste Mimiague	France	Q
Marcel Montuel	France	Q
Muller	France	Q
Henri Pantin	France	Q
Léopold Ramus	France	Q
René Raynaud	France	Q
Jules Ringnet	France	Q
Jules Rossignol	France	Q
Adolphe Rouleau	France	Q
Francis Sabourin	France	Q
Pierre Samiac	France	Q
Italo Santelli	Italy	Q
Pierre Selderslagh	Belgium	Q
Ernest Tassart	France	Q
Cyrille Verbrugge	Belgium	Q
Armand Viguier	France	Q
Henri Yvon	France	Q
Charles Bersin	France	
Jens Peter Berthelsen	Denmark	
Émile Bouard	France	
François Brun-Buisson	France	
Henri Coquelin	France	
Louis Coudurier	France	
Georges Daussy	France	
F. Després	Belgium	
Márton Endrédy	Hungary	
Louis Garnoty	France	
Jolliet	France	
Gustave Masselin	France	
Pietory	France	
Eugène Plisson	Great Britain	
Léon Thiércelin	Haiti	
Wineuwanheim	France	

=== Quarterfinals ===
The second round also used jury verdicts to determine advancement from the second round, held on 24 May. The top 10 fencers received automatic qualification to the semifinals while the rest competed in a repechage.

Fencer	Nation	Notes
Antonio Conte	Italy	Q
Alphonse Kirchhoffer	France	Q
Lucien Mérignac	France	Q
Jean-Baptiste Mimiague	France	Q
Léopold Ramus	France	Q
Jules Rossignol	France	Q
Adolphe Rouleau	France	Q
Italo Santelli	Italy	Q
Pierre Selderslagh	Belgium	Q
Cyrille Verbrugge	Belgium	Q
Xavier Anchetti	France	R
Alexandre Bergès	France	R
Michel Bettenfeld	France	R
Bormel	France	R
Jean-Marie Borringes	France	R
Marcel Boulenger	France	R
Jean Boulège	France	R
J. Brassard	France	R
Brau	France	R
Cannesson	France	R
Paul Carrichon	France	R
François Delibes	France	R
Dizier	France	R
Michel Filippi	France	R
Joseph Fontaine	France	R
Louis Gauthier	France	R
Louis Haller	France	R
Ludovic Laborderie	France	R
Jules Large	France	R
Lucien Largé	France	R
Georges Lefèvre	France	R
Adjutant Lemoine	France	R
Charles Marty	France	R
Joseph-Auguste Métais	France	R
Lucien Millet	France	R
Marcel Montuel	France	R
Muller	France	R
Henri Pantin	France	R
René Raynaud	France	R
Jules Ringnet	France	R
Francis Sabourin	France	R
Pierre Samiac	France	R
Ernest Tassart	France	R
Armand Viguier	France	R
Henri Yvon	France	R

=== Repechage ===
The repechage on 25 May was also conducted by jury selection following bouts. 6 fencers advanced to the semifinals.

Fencer	Nation	Notes
Marcel Boulenger	France	Q
Michel Filippi	France	Q
Louis Haller	France	Q
Lefèvre	France	Q
Adjutant Lemoine	France	Q
Lucien Millet	France	Q
Xavier Anchetti	France	
Alexandre Bergès	France	
Michel Bettenfeld	France	
Bormel	France	
Jean-Marie Borringes	France	
Jean Boulège	France	
J. Brassard	France	
Brau	France	
Cannesson	France	
Paul Carrichon	France	
François Delibes	France	
Dizier	France	
Joseph Fontaine	France	
Louis Gauthier	France	
Ludovic Laborderie	France	
Jules Large	France	
Lucien Largé	France	
Charles Marty	France	
Joseph-Auguste Métais	France	
Marcel Montuel	France	
Muller	France	
Henri Pantin	France	
René Raynaud	France	
Jules Ringnet	France	
Francis Sabourin	France	
Pierre Samiac	France	
Ernest Tassart	France	
Armand Viguier	France	
Henri Yvon	France	

=== Semifinals ===
The 16 remaining fencers were divided into two pools of 8. They competed in round-robin tournaments on 27 May and 28 May, with the top four in each pool advancing to the final. The others played in the consolation pool.

==== Semifinal A ====
Rank	Fencer	Nation	Wins	Losses	Notes
1	Lucien Mérignac	France	7	0	Q
2	Alphonse Kirchhoffer	France	6	1	Q
3	Antonio Conte	Italy	5	2	Q
4	Léopold Ramus	France	4	3	Q
5	Louis Haller	France	2	5	C
5	Adjutant Lemoine	France	2	5	C
7	Lucien Millet	France	1	6	C
7	Cyrille Verbrugge	Belgium	1	6	C

==== Semifinal B ====
Rank	Fencer	Nation	Wins	Losses	Notes
1	Adolphe Rouleau	France	7	0	Q
2	Jean-Baptiste Mimiague	France	6	1	Q
3	Jules Rossignol	France	5	2	Q
4	Italo Santelli	Italy	4	3	Q
5	Pierre Selderslagh	Belgium	3	4	C
6	Marcel Boulenger	France	1	6	C
6	Michel Filippi	France	1	6	C
6	Georges Lefèvre	France	1	6	C

=== Finals ===
==== Classification 9–16 ====
The consolation pool was held on 29 May. The bottom four fencers from each of the semifinals competed for 9th through 16th places.

Rank	Fencer	Nation
9	Louis Haller	France
10	Pierre Selderslagh	Belgium
11	Adjutant Lemoine	France
12	Georges Lefèvre	France
13	Marcel Boulenger	France
14	Lucien Millet	France
15	Cyrille Verbrugge	Belgium
16	Michel Filippi	France

==== Final ====
The final was conducted on 29 May. The format was a round-robin among the top 8 fencers. Ties were broken by an extra bout (ignoring the head-to-head results of the fencers during the round-robin).

Rank	Fencer	Nation	Wins	Losses
1st place, gold medalist(s)	Lucien Mérignac	France	6	1
2nd place, silver medalist(s)	Alphonse Kirchhoffer	France	6	1
3rd place, bronze medalist(s)	Jean-Baptiste Mimiague	France	4	3
4	Antonio Conte	Italy	4	3
5	Jules Rossignol	France	3	4
6	Léopold Ramus	France	2	5
7	Italo Santelli	Italy	0	7
8	Adolphe Rouleau	France	3	4
