= Peru at the 1900 Summer Olympics =

- IOC code: PER
- NOC: Peruvian Olympic Committee

in Paris
- Competitors: 1 in 1 sport
- Medals: Gold 0 Silver 0 Bronze 0 Total 0

Summer Olympics appearances (overview)
- 1900; 1904–1932; 1936; 1948; 1952; 1956; 1960; 1964; 1968; 1972; 1976; 1980; 1984; 1988; 1992; 1996; 2000; 2004; 2008; 2012; 2016; 2020; 2024; 2028

Peru competed at the 1900 Summer Olympics in Paris, France, which were held from 14 May to 28 October 1900. This edition of the games would be the first appearance for Peru at any of the Olympic Games. The athlete delegation consisted of one singular athlete, fencer Carlos de Candamo.

de Candamo first competed in the men's foil competition and advanced up to the quarterfinals of the event before he was relegated to a repechage round. In the round, he did not place high enough and did not advance to the semifinals. He then competed in the men's épée but was eliminated in the first round.

== Background ==
The 1900 Summer Olympics were held in Paris, France, from 14 May to 28 October 1900. Peru's appearance at these Games was its first-ever appearance at the Summer Olympics. One athlete represented Peru at the games, fencer Carlos de Candamo. de Candamo was born in Westminster and moved to Paris when his father was appointed as the ambassador of Peru to France. There, Carlos competed in multiple sports tournaments encompassing tennis and rugby.

== Fencing ==
The fencing events were held at the Tuileries Garden. He first competed in the men's foil competition, which were held from 14 to 21 May. The first round was held from 14 to 15 June, with de Candamo competing against Albert Cahen of France. There, they would both advance further to the quarterfinals on 16 June due to a jury decision. At the quarterfinals, he competed against Henri Masson and lost. de Candamo was relegated to a repechage round the following day but did not place high enough to qualify to the semifinals.

de Candamo then competed in the men's épée for amateur competitors, which were held from 1 to 14 June. He competed on 6 June in the first round of the event against five other competitors in the thirteenth pool. He did not rank within the top two of the pool and was thus eliminated from the competition, not advancing further.

Event	Place	Fencer	Round 1	Quarterfinals	Repechage	Semifinals	Final
Foil	25–34	Carlos de Candamo	Albert Cahen (FRA); Advanced by jury	Henri Masson (FRA); To repechage by jury	Not advanced by jury	did not advance	
Épée	35–104	Carlos de Candamo	3rd-6th in pool M	Did not advance	None held	did not advance	
