= Lodetti =

Lodetti is a surname. Notable people with the surname include:

- Giovanni Lodetti (1942–2023), Italian footballer
- Marcello Lodetti (1931–2012), Italian fencer and fencing coach
