= Luis Carlos Ruspoli, 6th Duke of Alcudia and Sueca =

Luis Ruspoli y Sanchiz

6th Duke of Alcudia and Sueca
- Tenure: 2016–present
- Predecessor: Prince Carlos Ruspoli
- Born: April 4, 1963 (age 63); Madrid, Spain
- Spouse: María Alvarez de las Asturias Bohorques Rumeu (m. 1992)
- Issue: Prince Carlos Ruspoli; Prince Luis Ruspoli; Prince Juan Ruspoli; Prince Jaime Ruspoli
Names
- Luis Carlos Ruspoli y Sanchiz
- House: Ruspoli
- Father: Prince Luis Ruspoli
- Mother: María del Carmen Sanchiz y Nuñez-Robres, 13th Marchioness of La Casta

Don Luis Carlos Ruspoli y Sanchiz, Morenés y Núñez-Robres, dei Principi Ruspoli GE (born April 4, 1963) is a Spanish aristocrat and lawyer.

He is the 6th Duke of Alcudia, Grandee of Spain First Class, 6th Duke of Sueca, Grandee of Spain First Class, both with a Coat of Arms of de Godoy and 20th Count of Chinchón Grandee of Spain First Class with a Coat of Arms of de Borbón-Anjou, 8th Marquis of Boadilla del Monte with a Coat of Arms of Ruspoli and Godoy and 3rd Baron of Mascalbo with a Coat of Arms of de Godoy. In Portugal Conde de Evoramonte. He is also Prince of the Holy Roman Empire, Maestrante de Granada and Caballero del Santo Caliz de Valencia.

== Life ==
He is the son of Luis Ruspoli, 7th Marquis of Boadilla del Monte, and first wife Doña María del Carmen Sanchíz y Núñez-Robres, Arróspide y Rodríguez de Valcárcel (Madrid, February 28, 1940 –), 13th Marchioness of La Casta.

== Marriage and children ==
He married in Madrid, 1992 with Doña María Álvarez de las Asturias Bohorques y Rumeu, de Silva y Cruzat, daughter of Don Luis Álvarez de las Asturias Bohorques y Silva, Goyeneche y Mitjans, son of the Dukes of Gor, and Doña María Rumeu y Cruzat, de Armas y Suárez de Argudín, daughter of the Marqueses of Casa Argudín, and had four sons:

- Don Carlos Ruspoli y Álvarez de las Asturias Bohorques, Sanchíz y Rumeu, dei Principi Ruspoli (Madrid, August 10, 1993 –). 7th Duke of Alcudia, maestrante de Granada.
- Don Luis Ruspoli y Álvarez de las Asturias Bohorques, Sanchíz y Rumeu, dei Principi Ruspoli (Madrid, August 24, 1994 –). 4th Baron of Mascalbo, maestrante de Granada.
- Don Juan Ruspoli y Álvarez de las Asturias Bohorques, Sanchíz y Rumeu, dei Principi Ruspoli (Madrid, October 20, 1996 –). Maestrante de Granada.
- Don Jaime Ruspoli y Álvarez de las Asturias Bohorques, Sanchíz y Rumeu, dei Principi Ruspoli (Madrid, March 10, 2000 –). Maestrante de Granada.

Spanish nobility
Preceded by Carlos Ruspoli	Duke of Alcudia; 2016–present	Succeeded by
Preceded by Carlos Ruspoli	Duke of Sueca; 2016–present	Succeeded by
Preceded by Luis Ruspoli	Marqués of Boadilla del Monte; 2011–present	Succeeded by
