= Raphaël Perrissoud =

French fencer

Personal information
- Nationality: French
- Born: 23 December 1879; Paris, France
- Died: 26 April 1956 (aged 76); Paris, France
- Height: 181 cm (5 ft 11 in)

Sport
- Sport: Fencing

Raphaël Hector Perrissoud (23 December 1879 – 26 April 1956) was a French fencer. He competed in the men's foil event at the 1900 Summer Olympics. He later served in the French Parliament as a Deputy in the National Assembly.
