= Émile Coste =

French fencer (1862–1927)

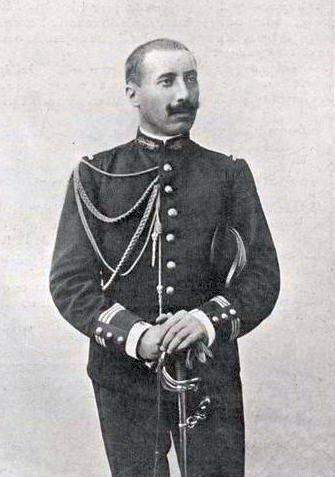

Medal record

Men's fencing

Representing France
Gold medal – first place	1900 Paris	Foil

Émile Louis François Désiré Coste (2 February 1862 in Toulon – 7 July 1927 in Toulon) was a French fencer who competed in the late 19th and early 20th centuries. He participated in Fencing at the 1900 Summer Olympics in Paris and won the gold medal in the foil, defeating fellow French fencer Henri Masson in the final.

== Honors and awards ==
- Commander of the Order of Legion of Honour
- Knight of the Order of St. Olav
