= Fencing at the 1906 Intercalated Games =

At the 1906 Summer Olympics in Athens, eight events in fencing were contested, all for men only. Now called the Intercalated Games, the 1906 Games are no longer considered as an official Olympic Games by the International Olympic Committee.

== Medal summary ==
Event	Gold	Silver	Bronze
Épée	Georges de la Falaise; France	Georges Dillon-Kavanagh; France	Alexander van Blijenburgh; Netherlands
Épée masters	Cyril Verbrugge; Belgium	Carlo Gandini; Italy	Ioannis Raissis; Greece
Team épée	France (FRA); Georges Dillon-Kavanagh; Georges de la Falaise; Pierre Georges Louis d'Hughes; Cyrill Mohr	Great Britain (GBR); William Grenfell; Cosmo Duff-Gordon; Charles Robinson; Edgar Seligman	Belgium (BEL); Constant Cloquet; Edmond Crahay; Philippe le Hardy; Fernand de Montigny
Foil	Georges Dillon-Kavanagh; France	Gustav Casmir; Germany	Pierre Georges Louis d'Hughes; France
Sabre	Ioannis Georgiadis; Greece	Gustav Casmir; Germany	Federico Cesarano; Italy
Sabre masters	Cyril Verbrugge; Belgium	Ioannis Raissis; Greece	none awarded
Sabre, three hits	Gustav Casmir; Germany	George van Rossem; Netherlands	Péter Tóth; Hungary
Team sabre	Germany (GER); Gustav Casmir; Jakob Erckrath de Bary; August Petri; Emil Schön	Greece (GRE); Ioannis Georgiadis; Triantaphylos Kordogiannis; Menelaos Sakorraphos; Chatran Zorbas	Netherlands (NED); James van Carnbee; Maurits van Löben Sels; Johannes Osten; George van Rossem

== Medal table ==
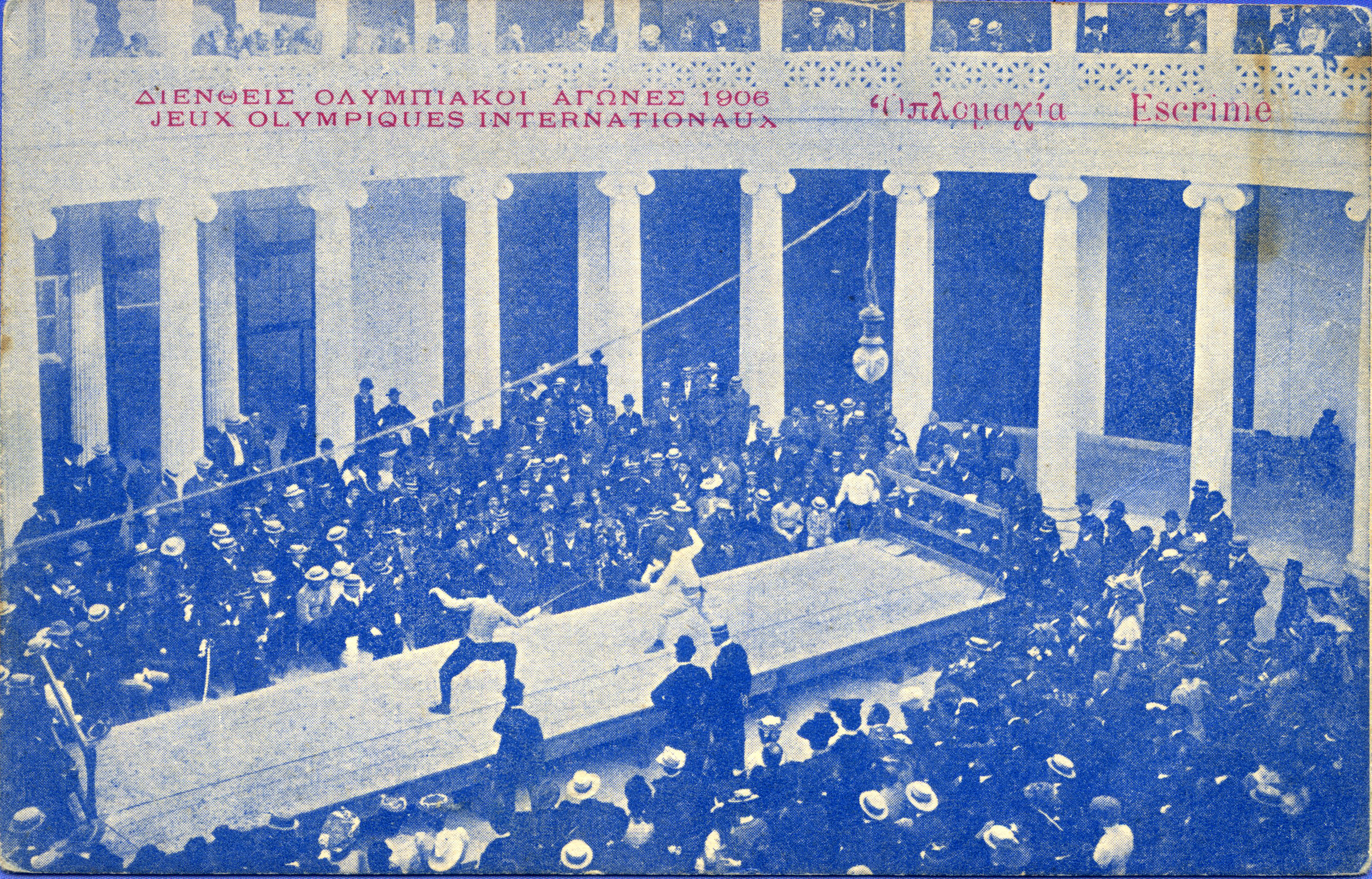
Fencing game in the Zappeion. Post card of 1906, published by Aspiotis.

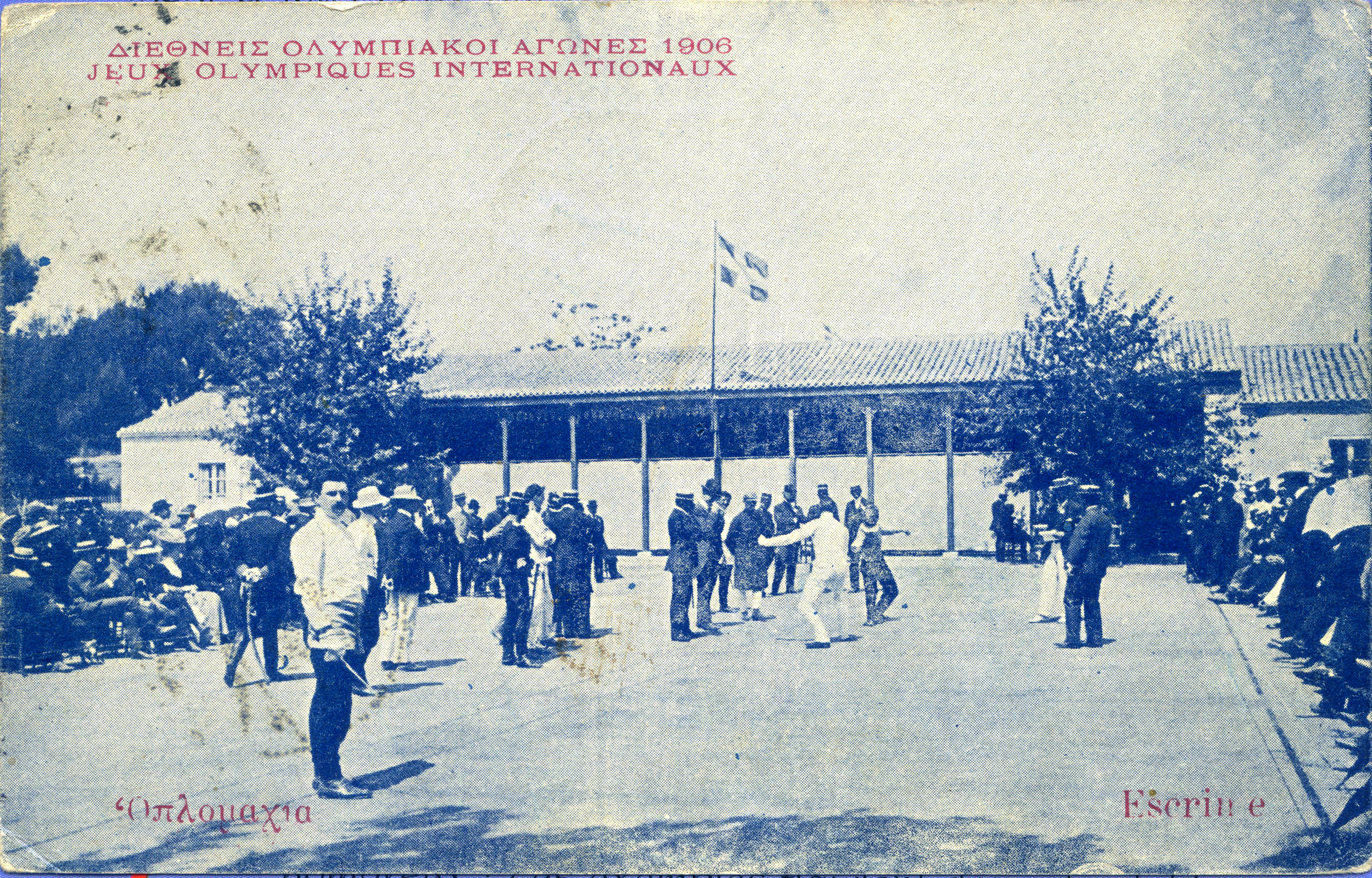
Fencing game in the open. Post card of 1906, published by Aspiotis.

Rank	Nation	Gold	Silver	Bronze	Total
1	France	3	1	1	5
2	Germany	2	2	0	4
3	Belgium	2	0	1	3
4	Greece	1	2	1	4
5	Netherlands	0	1	2	3
6	Italy	0	1	1	2
7	Great Britain	0	1	0	1
8	Hungary	0	0	1	1
Totals (8 entries)		8	8	7	23

== Participating nations ==
A total of 62 fencers, all men, from 12 nations competed at the Intercalated Games:

- Austria (3)
- Belgium (5)
- Bohemia (1)
- Denmark (3)
- France (5)
- Germany (5)
- Great Britain (5)
- Greece (13)
- Hungary (5)
- Italy (2)
- Netherlands (13)
- Sweden (2)
