= André Corvington =

Haitian fencer

Personal information
- Full name: Marie-Charles-André Corvington
- Born: 19 November 1877 Les Cayes, Haiti
- Died: 13 December 1918 (aged 41) Rheims, France

Sport
- Sport: Fencing

Marie-Charles-André Corvington (19 November 1877 – 13 December 1918) was a Haitian and French fencer and doctor. Born in Aux Cayes, he competed in the men's foil event at the 1900 Summer Olympics and joined the 141e régiment d'infanterie during World War I. He was posthumously awarded the Legion of Honour in 1923.

== Biography ==
Marie-Charles-André Corvington was born on 19 November 1877 in Aux Cayes, Haiti. He moved to Paris to study medicine and married Marguerite Louise Chamerois, eventually residing in Chamerois' father's house. Domestically, he competed in fencing and represented the sports club Salles d'Armes du Palais et Sociétés Savantes.

Corvington competed in the men's foil event at the 1900 Summer Olympics in Paris. He entered the competition as part of the French team, likely representing his sports club. Though, he was most likely a Haitian national at the time and is considered as a Haitian competitor at the 1900 Summer Games. He competed in the first round from 14 to 15 May, but did not advance further with his result in the round. He later received his Doctor of Medicine in 1904.

During World War I, he joined the 141e régiment d'infanterie, mobilized on August 1914, and was assigned to the 3 / 55 military hospital. He was a second class medical officer as part of the Surgical Ambulance Corps. Corvington died on 13 December 1918 Reims although the details of his death were unknown. He was posthumously awarded the Legion of Honour in 1923.

== See also ==
- List of Olympians killed in World War I
