= Carlos Ruspoli, 5th Duke of Alcudia and Sueca =

Carlos Ruspoli y Morenés
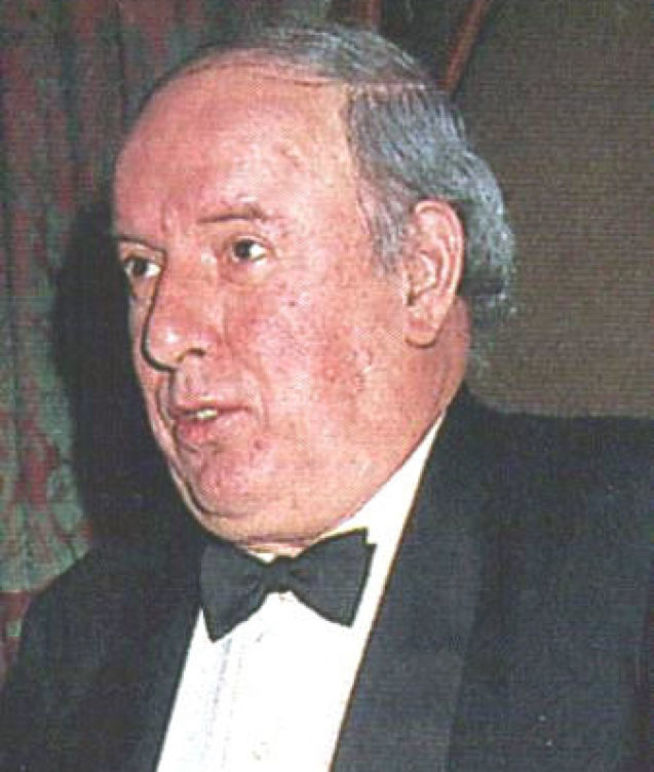
- Carlos Ruspoli y Morenés

5th Duke of Alcudia and Sueca
- Predecessor: Prince Carlos Ruspoli
- Successor: Prince Luis Ruspoli
- Tenure: 1958–2016
- Tenure: 1975–2016
- Born: 5 August 1932; San Sebastián, Spain
- Died: 25 October 2016 (aged 84); Madrid, Spain
Names
- Carlos Oswaldo Ruspoli y Morenés
- House: Ruspoli
- Father: Prince Carlos Ruspoli
- Mother: María de Belén Morenés y Arteaga, 18th Countess of Bañares

Don Carlos Oswaldo Ruspoli y Morenés, Caro y Arteaga, dei Principi Ruspoli (5 August 1932 – 25 October 2016) was a Spanish aristocrat, son of Carlos Ruspoli, 4th Duke of Alcudia and Sueca, and wife Dona María de Belén Morenés y Arteaga, García-Alesson y Echaguë, 18th Countess of Bañares.

He was the 5th Duke of Alcudia Grandee of Spain (formerly First Class) with a Coat of Arms of de Godoy (Letter of 28 November 1958), 5th Duke of Sueca Grandee of Spain (Letter of 5 May 1979), 19th Count of Chinchón Grandee of Spain with a Coat of Arms of de Borbón (Boletín Oficial of 3 January 1978 and Letter of 16 October 1978) and Prince of the Holy Roman Empire, Knight of the Sovereign Military Order of Malta and Maestrante of Granada.

Spanish nobility
Preceded by Camilo Ruspoli	Duke of Alcudia, Duke of Sueca, Count of Chinchón; 1958–2016	Succeeded by Luis Ruspoli y Sanchíz
