= Lucien Mérignac =

French fencer (1873–1941)

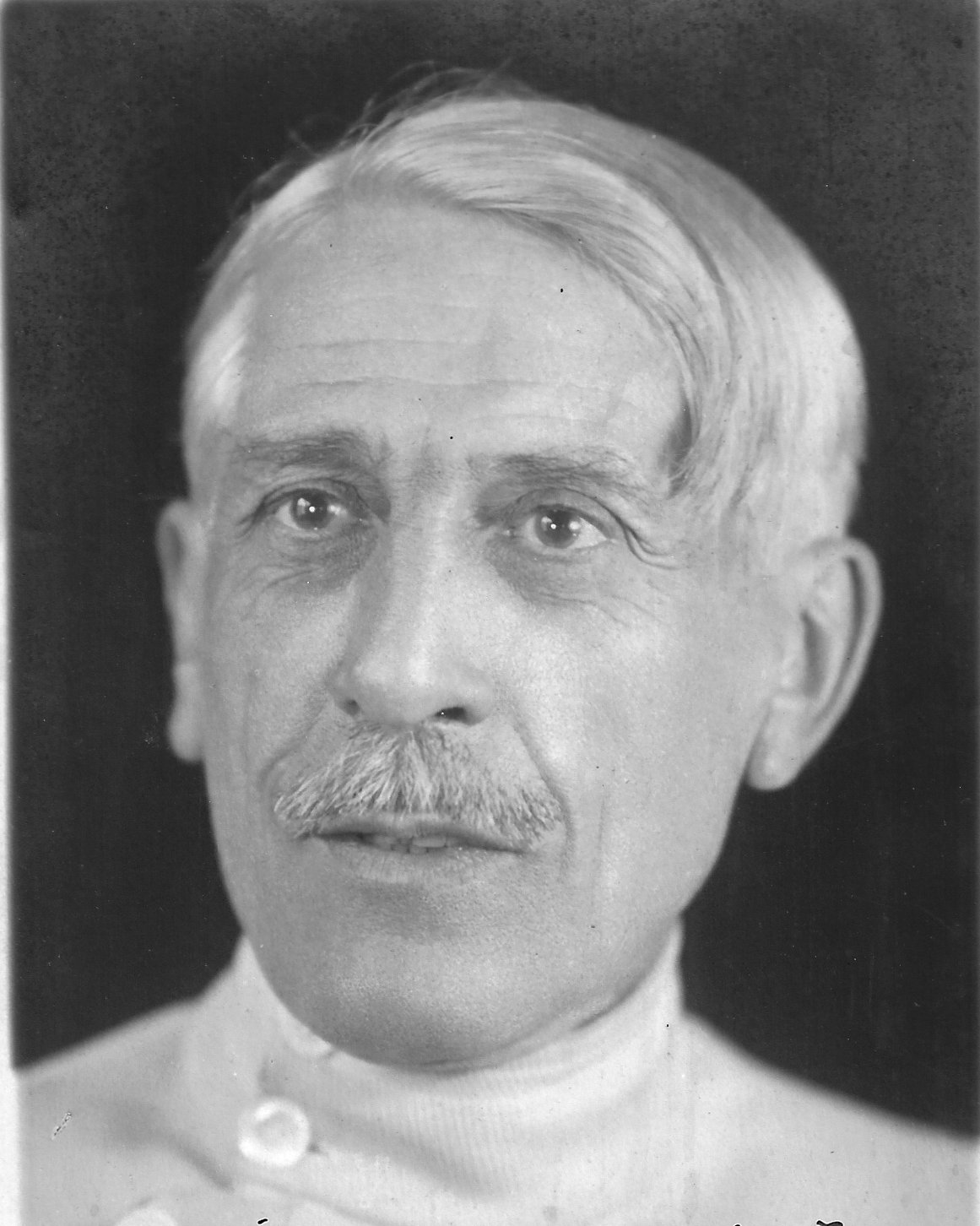
- Lucien Mérignac (1935)

Medal record

Men's fencing

Representing France
Gold medal – first place	1900 Paris	Masters foil

Louis Lucien Mérignac (5 October 1873 in Paris – 28 February 1941 in Paris) was a French fencer who competed in the late 19th century and early 20th century. He participated in Fencing at the 1900 Summer Olympics in Paris and won the gold medal in the masters foil, defeating fellow French fencer Alphonse Kirchhoffer in the final.

His aunt was the sculptor and medallist Ernesta Robert-Mérignac (1849–1933), who was an entrant in the 1924 Summer Olympics art competition.
