= Carlos de Candamo =

Peruvian diplomat and sportsman

Personal information
- Full name: Carlos González de Candamo y Rivero
- Born: February 15, 1871 London, England
- Died: February 16, 1946 (aged 75) Paris, France

Sport
- Sport: Fencing, Rugby, and Tennis
- Event: 68 kg

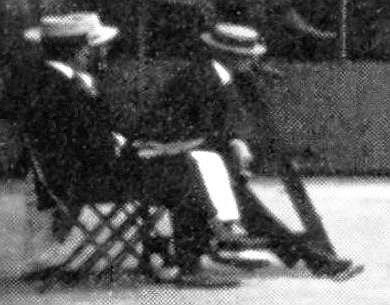

Carlos González de Candamo y Rivero (February 15, 1871 – 16 February 1946) was a Peruvian athlete and diplomat, he was the first Peruvian to compete at a Summer Olympics.

== Biography ==
De Candamo was born in London, England. His father was Ambassador to France for his native country, and his uncle Manuel Candamo, President of Peru.

De Candamo had many sporting talents, he played in the first edition of the French Open tennis competition in 1891 when there were just five entrants and it was played on grass, the next year he won the 1892 French Rugby Union Championship with Racing Club de France, predecessor to today's Racing Metro, he was captain and played alongside one of his brothers, he was then a runner-up in the 1892–93 French Rugby Union Championship.

He is mostly famous for representing Peru at the 1900 Summer Olympics in Paris. He is considered the first Olympic athlete to represent Peru, he entered two events in fencing, in the foil event, the winners were decided by judges, he qualified from his first round, in his next round he wasn't automatically advanced by the judges and was told to compete in the Repechage round, where he failed to advance any further, in his other event the épée, he was drawn in to a group of six fencers, although the full results are not known, we do know he finished outside the top two in the group so didn't advance, he was later invited to become a member of the International Olympic Committee a position he held from 1909 to 1922.

He followed the family tradition and became a diplomat, being appointed Envoy Extraordinary and Minister Plenipotentiary from Peru to the United Kingdom in May 1901. He later served as Peru's French Ambassador and signed the Treaty of Versailles on behalf of his country.
