= Gustav Casmir =

German fencer (1874–1910)

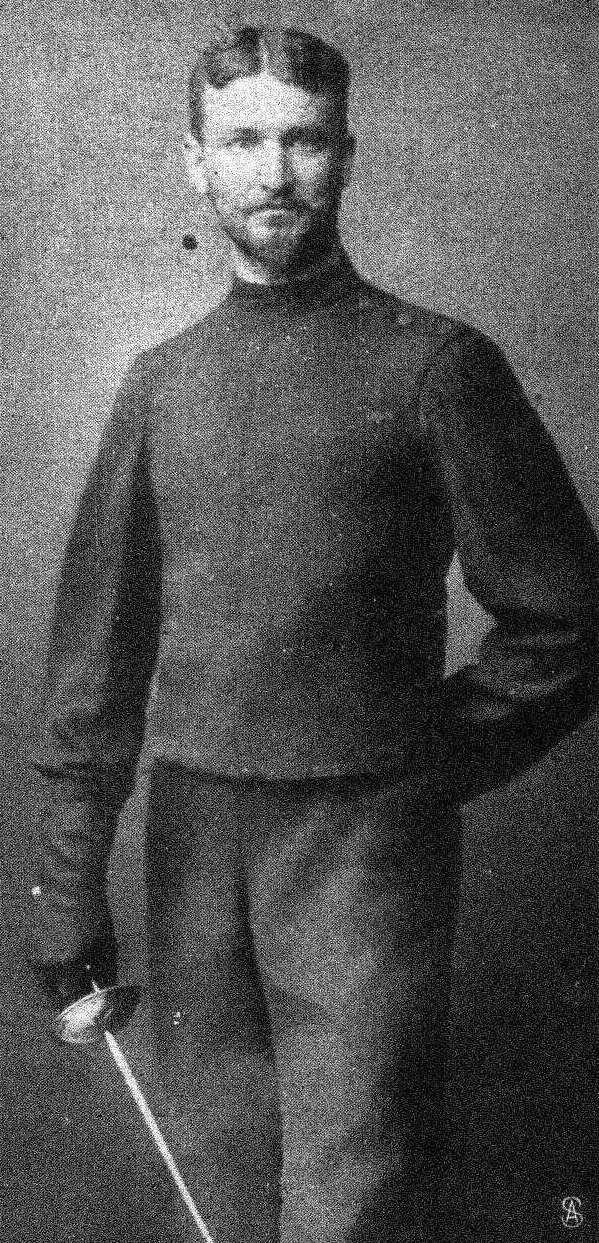

Personal information
- Born: 5 November 1872 Nikolaiken, German Empire
- Died: 2 October 1910 (aged 37) Kleinschönebeck, German Empire

Sport
- Sport: Fencing
Medal record
Men's fencing
Representing Germany
Intercalated Games
| Gold medal – first place | 1906 Athens | Sabre, team |
| Gold medal – first place | 1906 Athens | Three Hits |
| Silver medal – second place | 1906 Athens | Foil, Individual |
| Silver medal – second place | 1906 Athens | Sabre, Individual |

Gustav Casmir (5 November 1872 – 2 October 1910) was a German fencer. He won two gold and two silver medals at the 1906 Intercalated Games.
