= Marcello Lodetti =

Italian fencer and fencing coach (1931–2012)

Personal information
- Nationality: Italian
- Born: 26 July 1931 Milan, Italy
- Died: 6 December 2012 (aged 81) Milan, Italy

Fencing career
- Sport: Fencing
- Country: Italy
- Weapon: foil, épée and sabre
- National coach: Coach of the Italian team 1960-80
- Club: Circolo della Spada Maestro Marcello Lodetti Milan

Marcello Lodetti (1931–2012) was an Italian fencer and fencing coach.

Lodetti graduated in 1959 from the Accademia Nazionale Magistrale (ANS) and started fencing at the age of 7 at the Mangiarotti fencing club in Milano, near the Giuseppe Verdi conservatory. He then became a pupil of Giuseppe Mangiarotti, who had himself been a pupil of Renaud.

Giuseppe Mangiarotti passed on his fencing knowledge Giuseppe Mangiarotti passed on his fencing knowledge, enabling Marcello Lodetti to graduate on 31 May 1959, when his official career as a fencing master started. The young Marcello became an expert in two weapons (foil and épée) and was selected several times for the most important post-war competitions, where he was also part of the Italian national youth team. But his true vocation was teaching.

He was involved in training for the World Championships in 1959. On that occasion he wrote the notes that became the basis for the official teaching manual published in 1970 of the Italian Fencing Federation's school (Scuola dello Sport-Fis). The manual was also used to establish the National Qualification Standards (Snaq) for épée teaching.

Marcello Lodetti was an energetic coach during the Rome Olympics in 1960. Lodetti worked in Novara between 1960 and 1961 with the fencing master Vincenzo Canizzo, who had taught Saccaro, Beonio Brocchieri and Pellegatta and had trained people like Pellegrino, Breda, Carpaneda and Delfino during joint training sessions of the Italian national team. Also for the first time (the second time was from 1973 to 1975–76) he worked at Busto Arsizio, where he taught the Pellegatta brothers (Bruno Achille and Massimo), Sergio Fabrizi, Carlo Dell'Acqua for the fencing association Pro Patria Scherma. His relationship with Canizzo that was based on mutual admiration was further strengthened when they both found themselves working at the Mangiarotti school in Via Solferino where they formed a teaching team with the fencing masters Dario Mangiarotti and Ponzi.

Together with Elio Cucchiara and Lancia, he was the promoter and co-founder of the international summer centres for young people at Pievepelago and Zocca (1961 and 1963),. Here, he met the Hungarian head instructors Balogh and Kevey who introduced him to the study of the sabre and also trained him in the use of this double-edged weapon. The first Italian fencing masters teaching in the centres included Bassetti, Dante Galante, Lomele, Turrio, Livio Di Rosa, Augugliaro, Sommacal, Roberto, La Feltra, Bonato, his cousin Gianluigi Lodetti, La Mastra and Dario Mangiarotti.

From 1961 to 1967, Marcello Lodetti was the coach at the introductory fencing courses run by the Italian National Olympic Committee (Coni) in Milan together with the coach Bruna Colombetti.

In Pavia, from 1963 to 1965 he taught at Cus Pavia, where he trained Canevari, Ottini, Fantoni, and Francavilla (who was invited in 1964 to the world youth championships). In Bologna from 1967 he was at Virtus Bologna with Lancia, where he was entrusted with the group of young épée specialists who included Taviani. He was then with Felsinea until 1969.

In 1965, together with Giuseppe Mangiarotti he founded the first association of Italian fencing masters, which was the forerunner of today's AIMS.

In 1968 he started working at Mangiarotti Milano (1968–78), where he honed his craft to create champions like Gianfranco Mochi, Stefano Bellone, Ettore Bianchi and Sandro Resegotti. From 1970 to 1980 he was called upon continuously by the Italian National Team for joint coaching of both adult and youth teams for the Universiadi (World University Games ), both adult and youth teams for the Universiadi (World University Games ), Olympics and World Championships.

His pupils included Angelo Mazzoni, Gil A. Pezza and John Pezza. For a complete list of the fencers this fencing master taught, see the book dedicated to him.

Overall, his pupils have won more than 20 Italian awards in the Adult category in all three fencing disciplines (not counting lesser awards in the youth category and second, third and fourth category awards, and team awards, totalling about 90). 2 World titles in the Adults category, 1 silver and 2 bronze awards for team events. 1 Individual World Youth Title. 1 Individual World University Title 1 silver and 2 bronze team awards. One Olympic medal (bronze) for a team event. One individual Men's Épée World Cup award. One bronze medal at the Mediterranean Games, various world final events in the adult and youth categories for men's foil and men's épée and winners of various World Cups for adults and under 20s, both in Women's Foil and Men's Épée events. Other pupils whom he trained for years have made history in Italian fencing right up to now in innumerable contests at the Olympics, World Cups and World Championships (FIS yearbooks)

At the 1972 Munich Olympics he coached the women's foil team, helping Antonella Ragno to win a gold medal. In 1973 and 1977, at the Moscow and Sofia Universiadi (World University Games ) he was the only master fencer for all three disciplines. He was also a coach at the World Youth Championships in 1974 in Istanbul and at the Adult World Championships in 1979 in Melbourne.

From 1972 to 1975 he was also the chief instructor at Busto Arsizio for a second term. He was assisted by the master fencer Ponzi and one of his pupils was Gianni Muzio (to whom he entrusted the teaching after Muzio had become an instructor. Lodetti also trained the Felli brothers, Sottrici, Vago, and Marco Malvezzi.

From 1978 to 1980 he continued to coach the national team at the federation's sites in Milan and Giardino Milano.

He was invited to his third Olympics in Moscow in 1980 but could not take part because they were boycotted by the Italian Olympic delegation, which at the last moment did not send military competitors and directors and accompanying staff.

In 1985-86 he was asked to direct Pro Vercelli Scherma. This association was founded by the fencing master Visconti, who had been a pupil of Colombetti and had invented the anatomical hilt that is now used throughout the world. Here, he trained Schaier, Randazzo, Andreoli, Isola, Falcone, Tassinari, Zenga, Fenoglio and helped Elisa Uga win the Italian épée title.

From 1987–88 to 1993 he taught at Ras Milano, where he nurtured Anna Ferni, who went on to win Italian titles in both the foil and épée categories (and then won a medal in the World Championships) and Francesco Banzatti, who was a reserve in the Youth Épée World Championships and then became an Italian épée champion.

In 1989 he taught at the Circolo Scherma Desio club, where he was the first chairman of the sports club and the first instructor of the Fencing section and director of the centres introducing people to fencing.

In 1997 he was a joint promoter of the Fair Play and Child Development prize that was devised using the formula developed by the International Sport Psychology and Psychoanalysis Association.

In 2002 he became the instructor of the Marcello Lodetti fencing club in Milan, where alongside his son Giovanni he nurtured the technique of the master fencer Roberta Ravasi, who has competed in the Women's Épée World Cup and is currently co-director of the Marcello Lodetti Fencing Club

From 2012 he supervised and coordinated the training modules and workshops promoted as fencingmaster classes.

He was an honorary member of the Associazione Italiana Maestri di Scherma (Italian Fencing Masters Association).

In 2010 and 2012 he was a candidate for the Ambrogino d'oro (Gold Medal awarded by the city of Milan) with the support of Coni Lombardia, of Federazione Italiana Scherma (Italian Fencing Association) and of the Sports Department of Milan City Council.[14]

Fencing master Marcello Lodetti has been mentioned in different international fencing publications and collections of photographs.

In 2013 an épée model bearing his name was designed and produced to implement the teachings of his school and methodology.

In 2013 the Regions Trophy awarded by AMIS (Italian Fencing Masters Association) for the Master categories was dedicated to him.

Three books have been dedicated to this fencing master:

- "Scherma e Psicologia" published by AIPPS SIPCS the Lodetti Study Centre in 2011
- "Maestro Marcello Lodetti, tradizione, azione, rievoluzione". After the conference at Milan University the volume was presented in November 2013 that contains the minutes of the conference.
- "Manuale di Psicologia ad uso di istruttori, maestri e staff tecnico" Published by Maggioli Milano with afterword by Professor Giovanni Lodetti and Dr Alessandra Cova in 2014.

Four conferences dedicated to him should be mentioned:

- "Fratelli Sportivi D'Italia - Schermidori D'Italia"(Sporting Brothers of Italy – Fencers of Italy)
- "Marcello Lodetti tradizione, azione rievoluzione" (Marcello Lodetti, re-evolution action)by the Candido Cannavò sport foundation and SISS (Italian Sensory Science Society).
- "In ricordo del maestro Marcello Lodetti" (Remembering the fencing master Marcello Lodetti) organised by Federscherma (Italian Fencing Federation).
- "1º Congresso Internazionale Psicologia Clinica delle sport"(First International Congress of Clinical Psychology of Sport).

The First Master Fencer Lodetti International Trophy was set up in his memory in 2015 at the Milan Triennale. It was sponsored by the Lombardy Region branch of CONI (Italian Olympic Committee), the Italian Pavilion at EXPO Milan, CUS Milano (Milan University Sports Centre), Italian National Fencing Federation and other bodies and involved the Italian and Hungarian Women's national épée teams. The first edition was won by the Hungarian National Team.

== Publications ==
The Milan publishing house Mursia published Lodetti's Manuale di scherma in 1995 (written with the assistance of his son Giovanni), which has subsequently been republished. This book was not only adopted as a textbook for the Università del Molise's degree course in Motor Sciences (2010–11), but is also quoted in many international texts, like the one written by fencing master William Gaugler.

== Awards ==
- 2003 Medal of the City of Milan (donated by the Sports Department) at the Theatre by Verme on the day of the reopening for sportive events "for his great contribution to promoting sport in the city of Milan".
- 2005 Prize of the City of Milan (Sports Department) with the Italian Swimming Federation (FIN) and the "Anima Mundi" association in 2005 "for his vital contribution to promoting sport for the disadvantaged".
- 2010 Silver Palm for sporting technical merit awarded by CONI (Italian National Olympic Committee).
- 2011 Special Prize of the Fencing Italian Federation awarded during the adult world championships in Catania "for his great contribution to fencing"
- 2011 Aretusa D'Argento silver award by Councillor Wilma Rudolph for sporting and social merit.

== Biography ==
- Percorso di avvicinamento ai Workshops Magistrali 2012-13 , text CC-BY-SA 3.0, Milan, November 2012
