= Duke of Gor =

Hereditary title in the peerage of Spain

Dukedom of Gor
- Creation date: 10 July 1803
- Created by: Charles IV of Spain
- Peerage: Spain
- First holder: Nicolás Mauricio Álvarez de las Asturias Bohorques y Vélez Ladrón de Guevara, 1st Duke of Gor
- Present holder: Mauricio Álvarez de las Asturias Bohorques y Silva, 6th Duke of Gor
- Heir apparent: Mauricio Álvarez de las Asturias Bohorques y Álvarez de Toledo
- Seats: Palace of the Dukes of Gor (Granada); Castle of Olmillos de Sasamón

Duke of Gor (Spanish: Duque de Gor) is an hereditary title in the peerage of Spain, accompanied by the dignity of Grandee, and granted in 1803 by Charles IV to Nicolás Mauricio Álvarez de las Asturias Bohorques, 12th Lord of Gor, 6th Marquess of Trujillos, 5th Count of Torrepalma and field marshal of the Royal Spanish Armies.

Nicolás Mauricio was son of Alonso Diego Álvarez de las Asturias Bohorques y Verdugo, 11th Lord of Gor, 5th Marquess of Trujillos, 4th Count of Torrepalma, and of María Fausta Vélez Ladrón de Guevara y Enríquez, Countess of Canillas de los Torneros de Enríquez.

The title's name refers to the town of Gor in the province of Granada.

== List of Dukes de Gor ==
	Titular	Periodo
Lords of Gor First concession by the Catholic Monarchs in 1492
I	Juan de Almaraz	1492–1494
Second concession by the Catholic Monarchs in 1494
II	Sancho of Castile y Fernández Bernal	1494–1495
III	Sancho of Castile y Enríquez	1495–1505
IV	Diego of Castile y Enríquez	1505-
V	Sancho of Castile y Mendoza	
VI	Diego of Castile y Manrique	
VII	Juan of Castile y Benavides	
VIII	Diego of Castile y La Madrid	
IX	Sancho of Castile y de la Cueva	
X	María Antonia Verdugo y of Castilla	
XI	Alonso Diego Álvarez de Bohorques y Verdugo	
XII	Nicolás Mauricio Álvarez de las Asturias Bohorques	¿?-1803
Elevation to Duchy by Charles IV in 1803
I	Nicolás Mauricio Álvarez de las Asturias Bohorques	1803–1825
II	Mauricio Nicolás Álvarez de las Asturias Bohorques y Chacón	1825–1851
III	Mauricio Álvarez de las Asturias Bohorques y Guiráldez	1851–1877
IV	Mauricio Álvarez de las Asturias Bohorques y Ponce de León	1877–1930
V	Mauricio Álvarez de las Asturias Bohorques y Goyeneche	1930–1963
VI	Mauricio Álvarez de las Asturias Bohorques y Silva	1963-actual titular

== History of the Dukes of Gor ==
- I Duke: Nicolás Mauricio Álvarez de las Asturias Bohorques y Vélez Ladrón de Guevara (b.1741-d.1825), I Duke of Gor, VI Marquess of the Trujillos, V, Count of Torrepalma, VII Count of Canillas de los Torneros de Enríquez, was Marshal of the king.

He married first, María Teresa Péerez de Barradas y Fernández de Henestrosa, with whom he had no male succession, and secondly with María del Carmen Chacón y Carrillo de Albornoz Medrano y Jácome de Linden.

Duchess María del Carmen Chacón de Medrano was the daughter of Francisco Chacón-Manrique de Lara Medrano, who in turn was the son of Manuela Tomasa de Medrano y Angulo (1695), daughter of Andrés de Medrano y Mendizábal, II Count of Torrubia (1654), son of García de Medrano y Alvarez de los Ríos, regent of the Kingdom of Navarre and Seville in the 17th century. The Duchess was born in Seville on 17 July 1772, and died in Madrid on 2 May 1860, belonging to –by her paternal father Francisco Chacón-Manrique de Lara Medrano (1729-1785)– a branch of the Counts of Mollina, and by her maternal mother María del Carmen Carrillo de Albornoz Jacome de Linden to the ducal of Montemar (de Medrano and Carrillo de Albornoz both married in 1738). From his second marriage, he had a son:

- II Duke: Mariano Nicolás Álvarez de las Asturias Bohorques y Chacón Carrillo de Albornoz y Guevara (b.1799, d.1851)

II Duke of Gor, VII Marquess of Trujillos, VI count of Torrepalma, VIII count of Canillas de los Torneros de Enríquez, viscount of Caparacena, and of Abusejo. He married María de la O Jacoba Guiráldez y Cañas, VIII Viscountess of Valoria, daughter of Jaime Guiráldez y Mendoza.

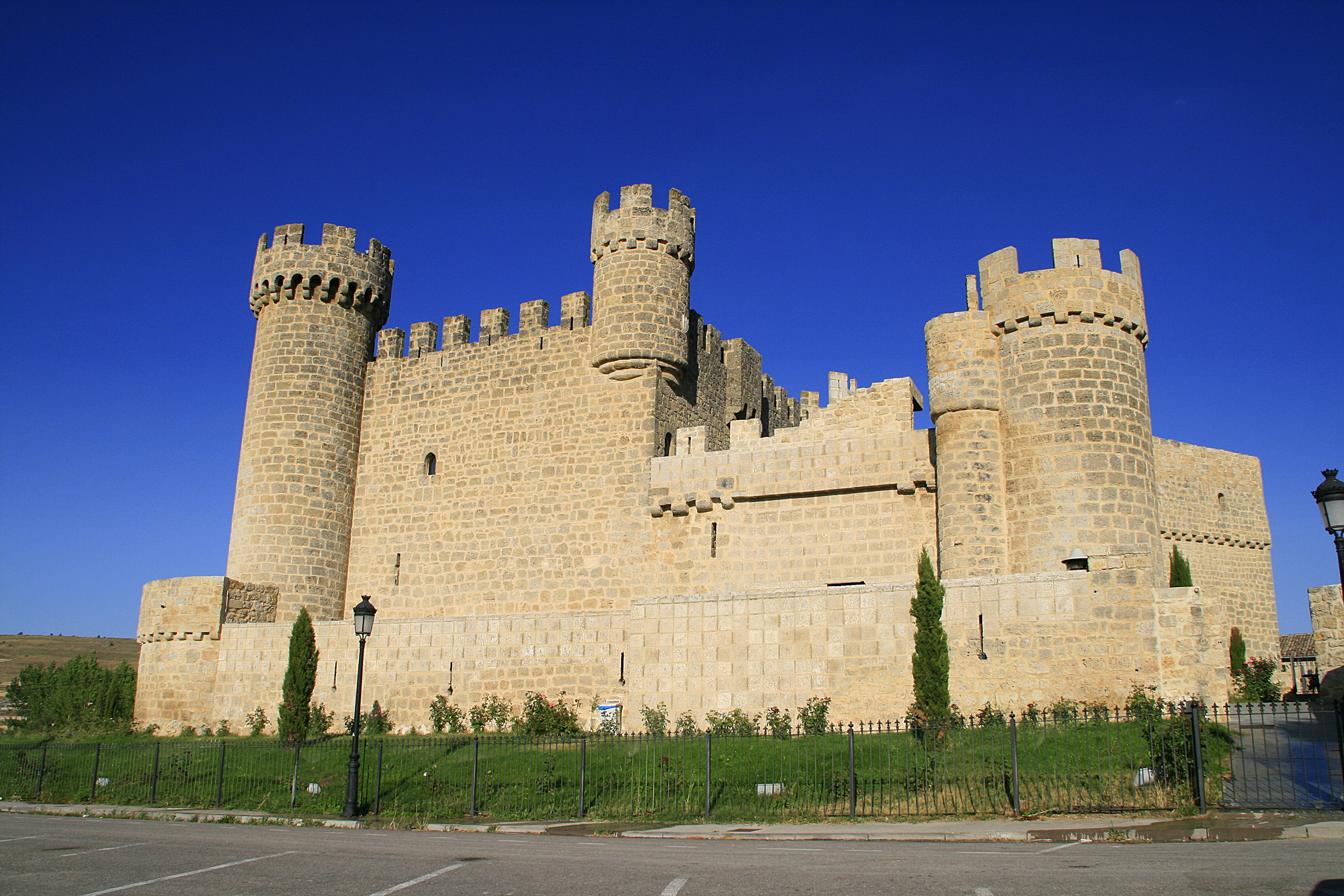
Castle of Olmillos de Sasamón (Province of Burgos).

By way of this marriage all the domains and possessions of the Valoria family, including the castle of Olmillos de Sasamón, province of Burgos, and all their fiefs were incorporated into the duchy of Gor. She was born in Valladolid on 16 December 1797, and died on 14 April 1867. His wife was the daughter of Jaime Giráldez Mendoza, and María de Cañas Portocarrero, and VI Countess of Lérida and VII Viscountess of Valoria. They had ten children: 1st Mauricio (1819-1877), future III Duke of Gor and IX Viscount of Valoria, 2nd María del Carmen, I Marchioness of Santa Isabel, 3rd María Josefa, married to José Casimiro de Villena, XI Marquis of Rafal, 4th María Luisa (1823-1888) married to José Alvarez de las Asturias Bohórquez, XVII Marquis of Mondéjar, 5th Nicolás married to María de la Consolación Ponce de León Balleras, VII Count of Lérida, 6th Jacoba, VIII Marchioness of los Trujillos, 7th Encarnación, 8th María Rosario, 9th José, VII Count of Torrepalma, and 10th Jaime, Count of Canillas de los Torneros. His son succeeded him:

- III Duke: Mauricio Álvarez de las Asturias Bohorques y Guiráldez (b.1819-d.1877)

III Duke of Gor, the firstborn son of Mauricio Nicolás Álvarez de Bohórquez Chacón, II Duke of Gor, and María de la O (Jacoba) Guiráldez de Cañas. He inherited all the noble titles that belonged to his father: III Duke of Gor, VIII Marquis of los Trujillos, VIII Marquis of Mayo, VIII Count of Canillas de los Torneros de Enríquez, VIII Count of Torrepalma, and Grandee of Spain of the first class. From his mother, he inherited the title of IX Viscount of Valoria. He also held the rank of Field Marshal. He died unmarried in Bordeaux (France) on 13 October 1877, so all his titles were inherited by his nephew (son of his brother Nicolás, VII Count of Lérida) Mauricio Álvarez de Bohórquez Ponce de León, except for the title of the Viscountcy of Valoria, which passed to his niece María del Rosario. His son succeeded him:

- IV Duke: Mauricio Álvarez de las Asturias Bohorques y Ponce de León (b.1864-d.1930)

IV Duke of Gor, He was born in Jerez de la Frontera (Cádiz) on 4 November 1864. Son of Nicolás Álvarez de Bohórquez Guiráldez de Cañas (1826-1878), VII Count of Lérida, and María Consolación Ponce de León Balleras, who came from the house of the Marquises of Castillo del Valle. Upon the death of his paternal uncle Mauricio Álvarez de Bohórquez Giráldez de Cañas, III Duke of Gor, who had no direct descendants, he inherited the majority of his noble titles: IV Duke of Gor, IX Marquis of los Trujillos, IX Marquis of Mayo, IX Count of Canillas de los Torneros de Enríquez, IX Count of Torrepalma, and Grandee of Spain of the first class. He married in Zarauz on 22 September 1892, to Rosa de Goyeneche y de la Puente (daughter of the Counts of Guaqui), and their children from this marriage are: Mauricio, José, María, Nicolás, and Rosa. The eldest, Mauricio, succeeded him in the title of Duke of Gor. His son succeeded him:

- V Duke: Mauricio Álvarez de las Asturias Bohorques y Goyeneche

V Duke of Gor, XI Count of Canillas de los Torneros de Enríquez. He married Beatriz de Silva y Mitjans, daughter of Jaime de Silva y Campbell, XV Duke of Lécera and XI Duke of Bournonville. His son succeeded him:

- VI Duke: Mauricio Álvarez de las Asturias Bohorques y Silva

VI Duke of Gor, Viscount of Caparacena. He married Isabel Álvarez de Toledo y Urquijo, daughter of Alonso Álvarez de Toledo y Cabeza de Vaca, XI Marquis of Villanueva de Valdueza, XI Viscount of the Armeria.

=== Additional History of the Dukes of Gor ===
The Duchy of Gor has owned numerous lands and properties in the city of Granada since the 16th century. These include the house on Plaza de los Girones, the church and school of the Escolapios, and the Moorish Alcazar Genil (al-Qasr al-Sayyid, "the palace of the lord"), which was known for many years as the "Huertas de los Duques de Gor." Gor and Gorafe, the main towns of the Dukedom farming lands, are located within the province of Granada, and their castles have been labelled by the Junta de Andalucia ("Autonomous Andalusian Government" in Seville) as B.I.C. ("Bien de Interes Cultural") since June 1985.

The Dukes of Gor developed in Granada; here they settled, building their own palace-house, equipped with a library, the envy of the city; in Granada they founded an Honorary Family Patronage of the Piarist Schools in buildings of their own (currently the College of the Piarist Fathers, in a crypt of whose church they have the family tomb. The last Duke buried there was D. Mauricio Alvarez de las Asturias Bohorques y Goyeneche, V Duke of Gor, who died in 1962); also, in this city of gardens where the murmur of clear water flowing from fountains is lost among the exotic colors of the water lilies in the pond bordered by myrtles, here they had the privilege of being the owners until recent times of the Queen's Garden, very famous among the people of Granada, with its palace of Nasrid architecture known by the name of Alcázar Genil or the palace of Abu Said, a National Monument from the 13th century.

Province of Burgos, Spain

During the rule of the II Duke of Gor, Mariano Nicolás Álvarez de las Asturias Bohorques y Chacón Carrillo de Albornoz Medrano y Guevara, tithes were abolished in Spain, and nobles who formerly received those tithes were compensated by the Crown. For the duke of Gor, the 1859 compensation amounted to 2.1 million reales, a significant part of the duke's total liquid capital of 2.9 million reales. The II Duke of Gor obtained all the domains and possessions of the Valoria family, including the castle of Olmillos de Sasamón, province of Burgos, and all their fiefs were incorporated into the duchy of Gor.

His son succeeded him:

The III Duke of Gor served on a diplomatic mission to Saint Petersburg (December 1856 - June 1857) and was accompanied by a young Juan Valera y Alcalá-Galiano, who "poke[d] gentle fun at the duke" in his Cartas desde Rusia.

His son succeeded him:

Mauricio Álvarez de las Asturias Bohorques y Ponce de León, the 4th Duke of Gor, was the first Spanish athlete to participate in the Olympic Games. He competed in fencing events, including epee, sabre, and foil, at the 1900 Olympic Games in Paris. Mauricio Álvarez's son, José, was also an Olympic athlete, participating in various equestrian events at the 1924 Paris Olympics and the 1928 Amsterdam Olympics. He even won a gold medal in the team jumping event at the latter Games.

=== Alcazar Genil ===
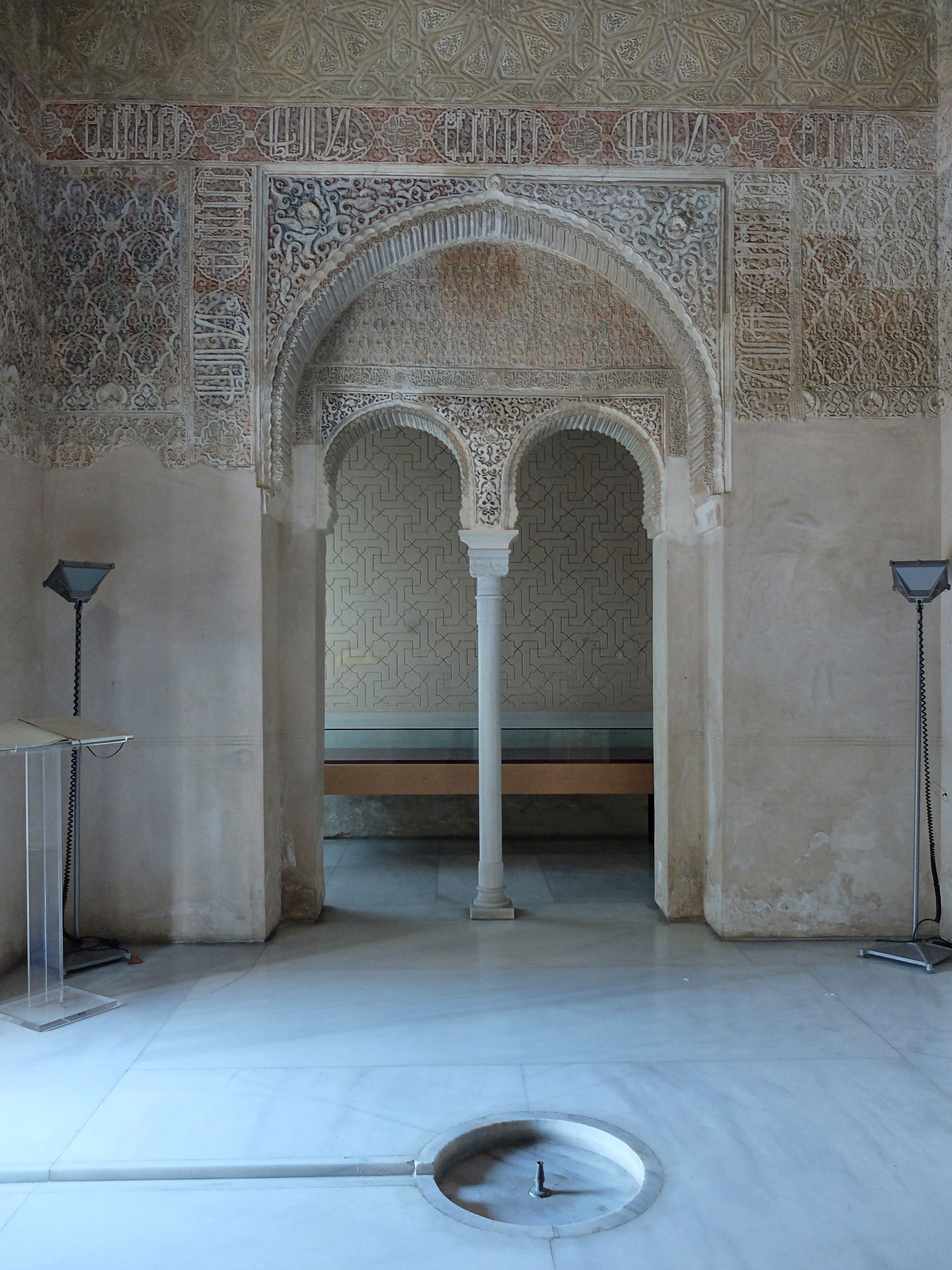
Interior of the central chamber, with floor fountain and arched entry to side chamber at the Alcázar Genil

The Alcazar Genil in the Islamic era belonged to Boabdil's mother, listed among the assets sold by her to the Catholic Monarchs, later becoming the property of the Dukes of Gor. The Alcazar was part of a large orchard that extended from the College of the Piarist Fathers to the last buildings of the current Jardín de la Reina Urbanization, that is, quite a few thousand square meters at a key point in the city. The expansion of the city in this area eliminated the lushness of this orchard. Entering through the road of Armilla, at a very short distance, a leafy orchard called Jardín de la Reina (sic) appears, where there was an Islamic palace called Alcázar de Xenil, owned by the Moorish Queens, from whom it passed to the Catholic Monarchs, and its current owner, the Duke of Gor, preserves it with commendable appreciation.

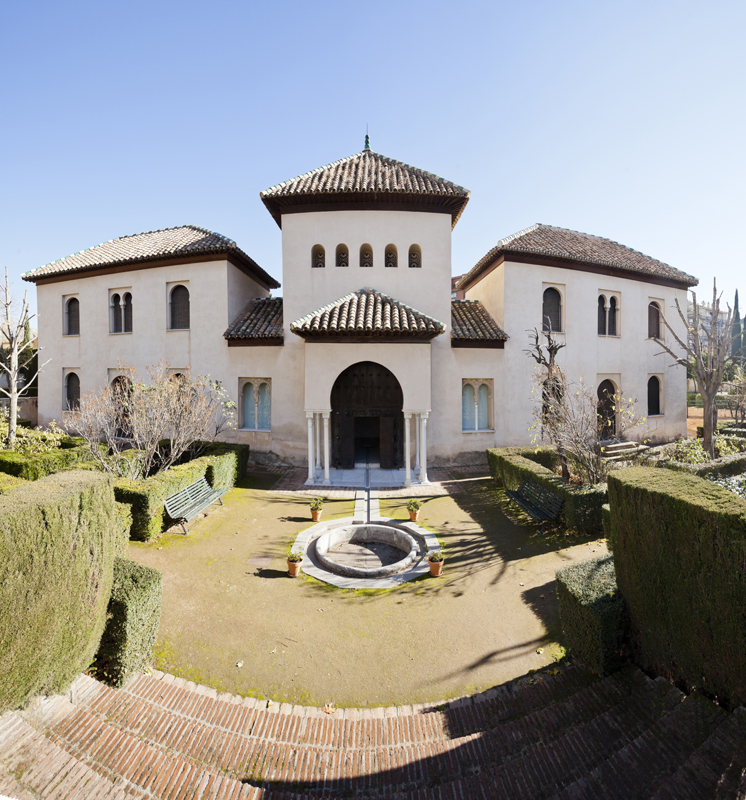
Alcázar Genil, Granada

This Moorish building features a small room decorated with extraordinary sumptuousness and exquisite taste, undoubtedly in the times of Yusuf I of Granada. Among the ornamentation of the walls, some inscriptions stand out, of which the most important is written on two friezes that surround the room, with gallant cursive and kufic characters: "Glory to our lord the Sultan.- He whose words are beautiful and whose features of generosity are full of glory.- The fair and fearless king"; also, there is the "Only Allah is the victor" and the following one above the twin arches of the alcoves that open in the side walls: "Oh, my hope... seal my works with goodness." At the top of the room, there are twenty arches through which light enters, and above them, the wide cornice of mocárabes stands out, supporting the lattice coffered ceiling. A short distance in front of the tower, there is a colossal pond, which measures 121.40 meters by 28, at whose end, foundations and the underground part of an extensive nave still exist with its corresponding porch, from which they would enjoy the beautiful view of the pool full of water and the naval games that they say took place in it. But to the east, another Moorish pond of circular shape is preserved.

== Library ==
The first duke, Nicolás Mauricio Álvarez de las Asturias Bohorques, lived in Granada in the palace of Gor, later renovated by Francisco Giménez, and acquired a library containing 6,000 manuscripts, books and Arabic documents dating from the 14th and 15th century, from the time of the Emirate of Granada. Arevalo was acquainted with American writer Washington Irving, later Minister to Spain (1842 to 1845); Irving stayed with the duke of Gor during his first visit to Spain, in 1829, and used the duke's library for his Chronicles of the Conquest of Granada (1829).

The collection was acquired in 1962 by the multimillionaire banker Bartolomé March, one of General Francisco Franco's financial advisers. The Dukes of Gor's collection, which formed the largest and most important part of March's collection, was catalogued in 1907.

One notable book in the duke's library was a first edition of Gaspar Correia's Lendas da Índia.

=== The Duke of Gor's Library ===
The origin of the library that has survived into the 20th century, known in Granada as the Duke of Gor's Library, dates back to the late 17th century with the inclusion of a vast collection of books by Don Pedro Verdugo de Albornoz y Ursúa, II Count of Torrepalma. He established the foundations of this library in his house near the Carrera del Darro. Don Pedro spent many years amassing an extensive literary collection, which included various Arabic codices, letters, manuscripts, and poetry from both Luis de Góngora and Francisco Quevedo. The collection also contained several 15th-century incunabula. Pedro Verdugo's successor, Alfonso Verdugo, III Count of Torrepalma and lord of Gor, had a strong interest in literature and continued to expand the library's holdings.

He was also a member of the Poetic Academy El Trípode, which convened at the Sacromonte Abbey. The great-grandson of the library's founder, the II Duke of Gor, acquired the literary collection and established it in his house on Plaza de los Girones. The space, which housed a vast number of volumes, underwent modifications in 1882 and further expansion in 1898. In 1962, the most valuable part of the library was sold by the then Duke of Gor to the bibliophile Don Bartolomé March Servera, who transported it to Madrid to incorporate it into his extensive archive. With over 20,000 volumes, it became one of the finest privately owned libraries in Spain.

== Palace of the Dukes of Gor ==
In the Realejo neighborhood, adjacent to the Palace of the Counts of Gabia, and opposite the Girones' house, is the Palace House of the Dukes of Gor, a noble mansion from the late 19th century, which currently houses several offices and classrooms of the College of the Mercedarias. "The palace-houses of the Counts of Gabia and the Dukes of Gor are two typical Granada houses that respond to the type of architecture with noble reminiscences built in Granada in the 19th century... They are significant palatial houses of Granada architecture." This Palace was sold by Don Mauricio Alvarez de las Asturias Bohorques y Silva, VI Duke of Gor, to the Mercedarian congregation, who plan to expand their adjacent Educational College. On the main door, in the center of the carved stone arch, is the coat of arms of the Ducal House of Gor. Large windows and balconies adorn its facade, with crafted wrought iron grilles. The mural paintings that adorn its rooms are still visible, including the large hall on the upper floor and the coffered ceiling covering the space of the stately stairs. The forged iron door leads to the garden where there are magnolia, pine, and orange trees. There was a library and archive in this mansion.

The 3rd Duke of Gor, Don Nicolás Alvarez de Bohórquez y Giraldez, along with his wife, Doña Consolación Ponce de León y Balleras, commissioned the reconstruction of an old family building in 1882. For the project, they chose the architect Don Francisco Jiménez Arévalo.

The building consists of two floors and follows the fashionable trends of the time. It features a façade of exposed brick, combining stone elements and modernist decorations, such as the mascarons found on the cornice. The façade also includes large bay windows with wrought iron railings. The entrance is an arch with the ducal shield of Don Diego de Castilla, an ancestor of the family, prominently displayed in the keystone.

The ground floor is arranged around a large rear courtyard, adorned with magnolias, pine trees, and orange trees, accessible from the vestibule in front of the main entrance.

Around the courtyard-garden, you could find the porter's lodge with a small room, a granary, a garage, stables, a corral, a laundry area, a living room, an office space, and a library.

The staircase leading to the upper floor was covered by a wood coffered ceiling. The main floor features over twenty rooms, with three patio openings and the dining room serving as its focal points. It was adorned with mural paintings, especially in the living room. The s house is famous for its library.
