= Frédéric Soudois =

French fencer

Personal information
- Full name: Marie Frédéric Marc Soudois
- Born: 14 February 1865; Le Château-d'Oléron, Second French Empire
- Died: 20 August 1914 (aged 49); Fonteny, France

Sport
- Sport: Fencing

Marie Frédéric Marc Soudois (14 February 1865 – 20 August 1914) was a French fencer. He competed in the men's foil event at the 1900 Summer Olympics.

== Personal life ==
Soudois served as a capitaine (captain) in the 344th Infantry Regiment of the French Army during the First World War and was killed in action in Moselle on 20 August 1914.
