= Joseph Ducrot =

French fencer

Personal information
- Full name: Joseph Jean Jules Ambroise Ducrot
- Nationality: French
- Born: 13 August 1866; Vernon, Second French Empire
- Died: 25 September 1915 (aged 49); Massiges, France

Sport
- Sport: Fencing

Joseph Jean Jules Ambroise Ducrot (13 August 1866 – 25 September 1915) was a French fencer. He competed in the men's foil event at the 1900 Summer Olympics.

== Personal life ==
Ducrot served as a chef de bataillon in the 21st Colonial Infantry Regiment of the French Army during the First World War. He was killed in action in Marne on 25 September 1915.
