= Ernest Tassart =

French fencer

Ernest Maurice Tassart (18 November 1868 in Paris – 26 August 1930 in Marylebone) was a French competitor in foil fencing competitions at the 1900 Summer Olympics. He owned Tassart's Salle D'Armes at Margaret Street, Oxford Circus, London during the 1910s and regularly held the annual varsity (Oxford vs. Cambridge university) fencing matches.
