= Rudolf Brosch =

Austrian fencer

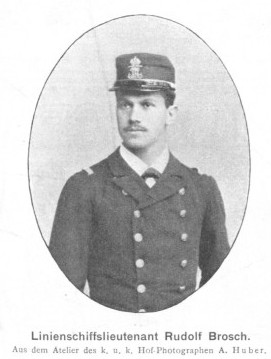

Sport
- Country: Austria
- Sport: Fencing

Rudolf Brosch was an Austrian fencer. He competed in the individual foil event at the 1900 Summer Olympics. He also worked as a translator of the fencing books of Luigi Barbasetti, who was his fencing teacher, and wrote books about fencing himself.
