= Jean-Baptiste Mimiague =

French fencer (1871–1929)

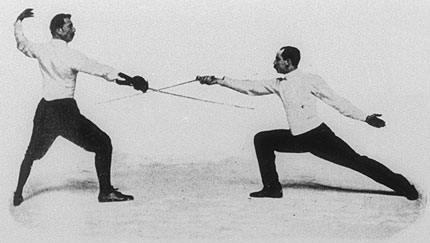
- Jean-Baptiste Mimiague (right) competing in the masters foil event against Italo Santelli

Medal record

Representing France

Men's Fencing

Olympic Games
Bronze medal – third place	1900 Paris	Masters foil

Jean-Baptiste Narcisse Mimiague (3 February 1871 in Villefranche-sur-Mer – 6 August 1929 in Nice) was a French fencer who competed in the early 20th century.

He participated in Fencing at the 1900 Summer Olympics in Paris and won both his bouts against the famous Italian fencer Italo Santelli. He won the bronze medal in the individual foil masters.
