= Cyrille Verbrugge =

Belgian fencer

Personal information
- Born: 9 November 1866 Mouscron, Belgium
- Died: 4 May 1929 (aged 62) Antwerp, Belgium

Sport
- Sport: Fencing
Medal record
Men's fencing
Representing Belgium
Intercalated Games
Gold medal – first place	1906 Athens	Épée, Masters, Individual
Gold medal – first place	1906 Athens	Sabre, Masters, Individual

Cyrille C. Verbrugge (9 November 1866 – 4 May 1929) was a Belgian fencer. He won two gold medals at the 1906 Intercalated Games.
