= Tony Smet =

Belgian fencer

Personal information
- Full name: Antoine Joseph Ghislain Smet
- Born: 16 February 1870 Tournai, Belgium

Sport
- Sport: Fencing

Antoine Joseph Ghislain "Tony" Smet (16 February 1870, date of death unknown) was a Belgian fencer. He competed in the individual foil and épée events at the 1900 Summer Olympics. He finished the foil event in 14th place.
