= Georges Dillon-Kavanagh =

French fencer (1873–1944)

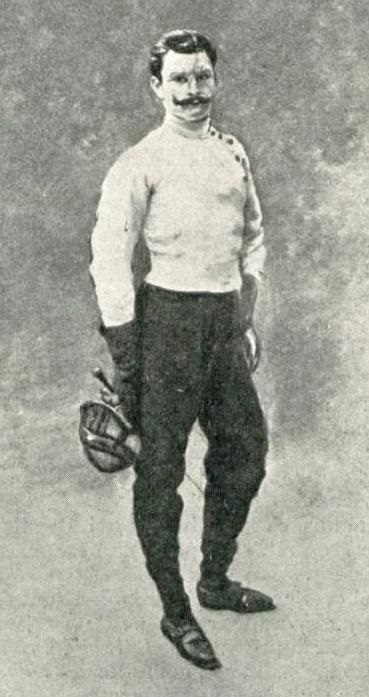
- in 1904

Personal information
- Born: 14 February 1873 Nîmes, France
- Died: 4 August 1944 (aged 71) Laugnac, France

Sport
- Sport: Fencing
Medal record
Men's fencing
Representing France
Intercalated Games
Gold medal – first place	1906 Athens	Individual foil
Gold medal – first place	1906 Athens	Team épée
Silver medal – second place	1906 Athens	Individual épée

Georges Arthur Dillon-Kavanagh du Fertagh (14 February 1873 – 4 August 1944) was a French fencer. He won three medals at the 1906 Intercalated Games.
