= Clément de Boissière =

French fencer

Personal information
- Born: 20 April 1875 Montauban, France
- Died: 2 January 1930 (aged 54) Le Havre, France

Sport
- Sport: Fencing

Clément Félix de Boissière (20 April 1875 – 2 January 1930) was a French fencer. He competed in the individual foil, sabre and épée events at the 1900 Summer Olympics.
