= Pierre d'Hugues =

French fencer

Medal record

Men's fencing

Representing France

Intercalated Games
Gold medal – first place	1906 Athens	Team épée
Bronze medal – third place	1906 Athens	Individual foil

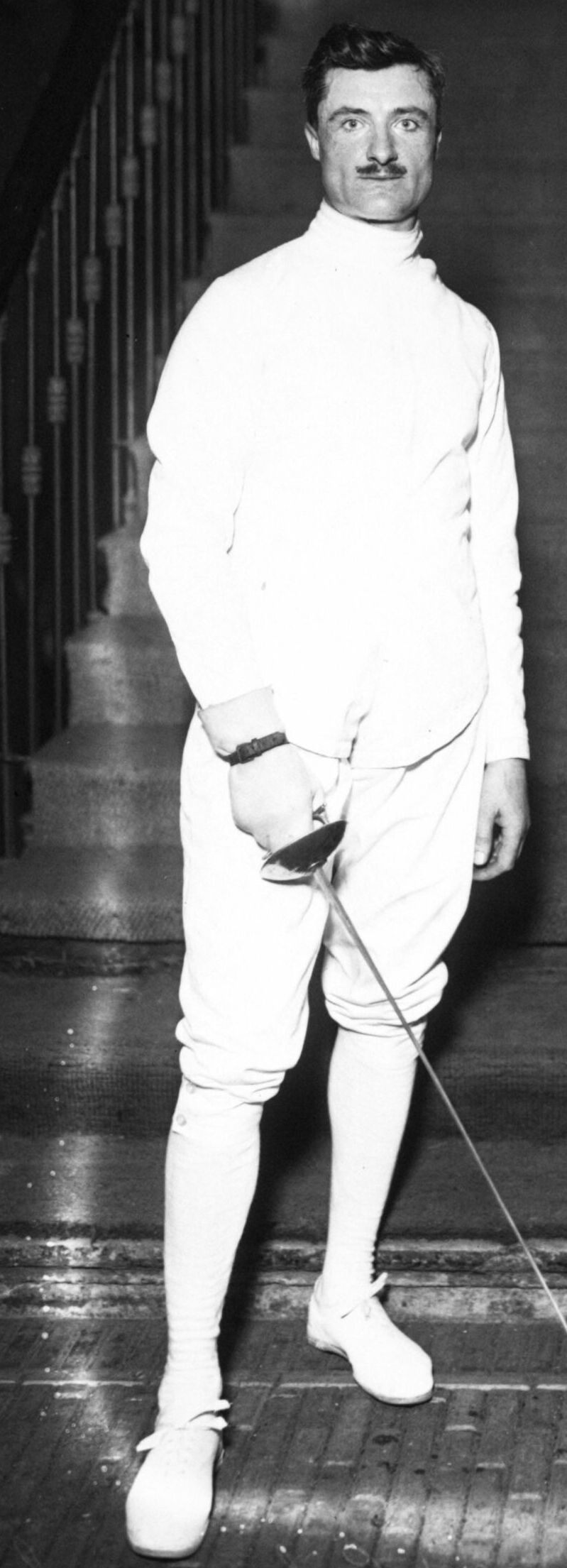

Pierre Georges Louis Gaston d'Hugues (Note: other sources spell his name d'Hughes) (November 8, 1873 in Orléans – August 21, 1961 in Versailles) was a French fencer who competed in the early 20th century.

He participated in Fencing at the 1900 Summer Olympics in Paris and successfully fought his way through the preliminary heats, the quarter-finals and the semi-finals reaching the foil final. He finished in fifth place overall.

He also competed in fencing in the 1906 Intercalated Games in Athens, winning a gold medal in the team épée event and a bronze medal in the foil event.
