= Adrien Guyon =

French fencer

Personal information
- Born: 22 July 1866; Paris, Second French Empire
- Died: 21 May 1926 (aged 59); Paris, France

Sport
- Sport: Fencing

Adrien Léopold Marie Guyon (22 July 1866 – 21 May 1926) was a French fencer. He competed in the individual foil and épée events at the 1900 Summer Olympics.
