= Emil Fick =

Swedish fencer (1863–1930)

Personal information
- Born: 18 July 1863; Landskrona, Sweden
- Died: 20 February 1930 (aged 66); Stockholm, Sweden

Sport
- Sport: Fencing

Emil Fredrik Fick (18 July 1863 – 20 February 1930) was a Swedish fencer. He competed at the 1900 and 1906 Summer Olympics.
