= Paul Robert (fencer) =

Swiss fencer

Personal information
- Died: 1961

Sport
- Sport: Fencing

Paul Robert (died 1961) was a Swiss fencer. He competed in the individual foil and épée events at the 1900 Summer Olympics.
