= Gor, Granada =

Gor
- Municipality
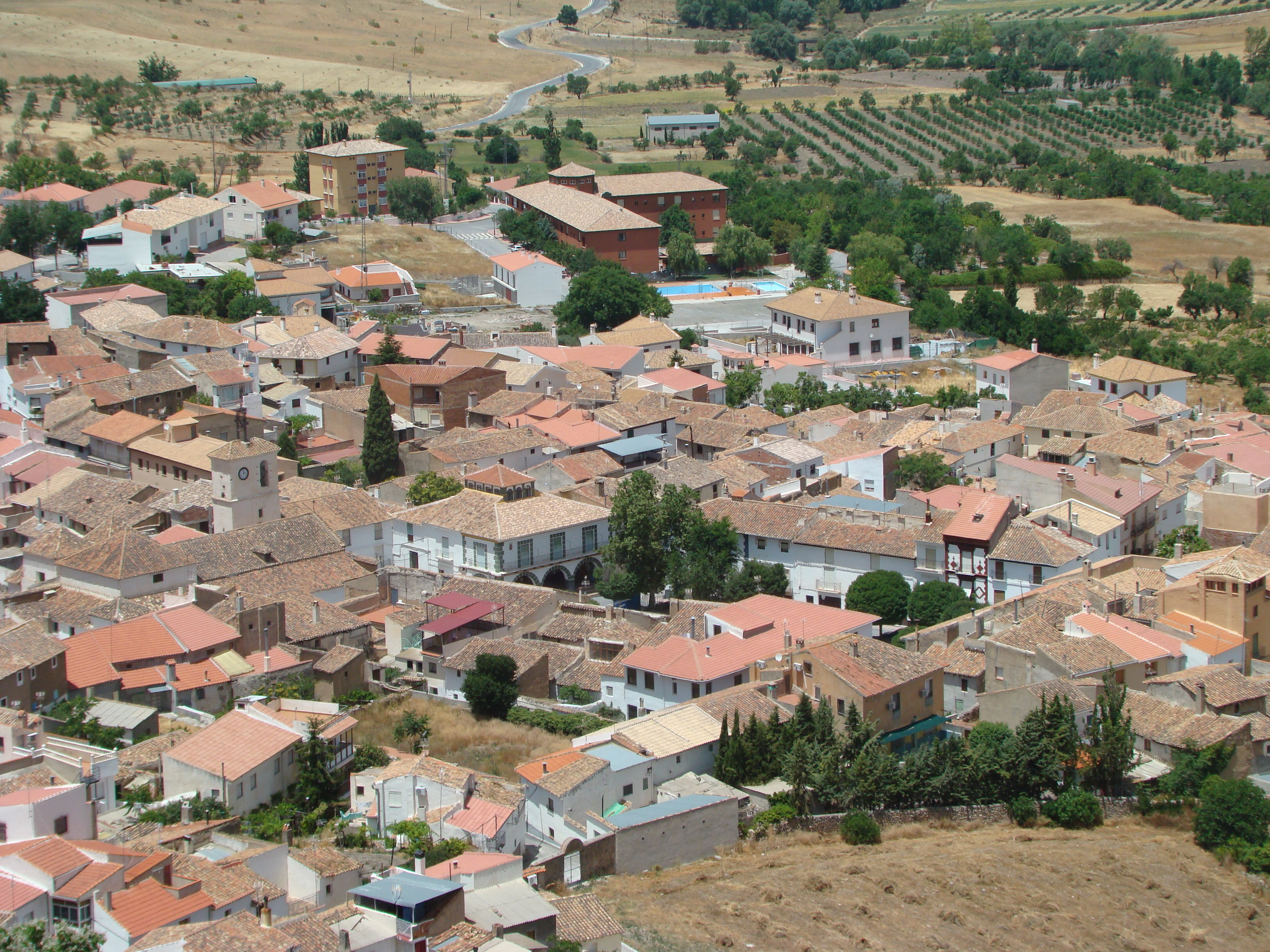

- Flag Coat of arms

- Location in Spain
- Coordinates: 37°22′N 2°58′W
- Country: Spain
- Autonomous community: Andalusia
- Province: Granada
- Comarca: Comarca de Guadix
- Judicial district: Guadix

Government
  - Mayor: Miguel Molina Soria (2020) (PSOE-A)

Area
  - Total: 182 km^{2} (70 sq mi)
- Elevation: 1,238 m (4,062 ft)

Population (2025-01-01)
  - Total: 766
  - Density: 4.21/km^{2} (10.9/sq mi)
- Demonym: Goreño/a
- Time zone: UTC+1 (CET)
  - Summer (DST): UTC+2 (CEST)
- Postal code: 18870
- Website: Official website

Gor is a town of Granada, in south east Spain. It consists of the town center and several suburbs scattered all over its municipal area, such as Las Juntas, Las Viñas, Cenascuras, Los Balcones, La Rambla Valdiquín, Los corrales, El Royo Serval and La Estación de Gorafe. Situated at an altitude of between 1,100 m and 2,100 m above sea level and with an extension of 182 km², Gor has a long history of human settlements that date back to the Paleolithic. The official population of Gor in 2005 was 997.

Gor's patron saint is Saint Cayetano.

== See also ==
- List of municipalities in Granada
