= Henri Jobier =

French fencer (1879–1930)

Personal information
- Born: Louis Pierre Henri•Jobier; 6 July 1879 Courson-les-Carrières, France
- Died: 25 March 1930 (aged 50) Paris, France

Sport
- Sport: Fencing
Medal record
Men's fencing
Representing France
Olympic Games
| Gold medal – first place | 1924 Paris | Team foil |

Louis Pierre Henri Jobier (6 July 1879 – 25 March 1930) was a French fencer. He won a gold medal in the foil competition at the 1924 Summer Olympics.
