= Félix Debax =

French fencer

Personal information
- Full name: Félix Lucien Roger Debax
- Nationality: French
- Born: 28 September 1864 Toulouse, France
- Died: 25 August 1914 (aged 49) Saint-Maurice, France
- Military career
- Allegiance: France
- Branch: French Army
- Service years: 1882–1914
- Rank: Chef de Bataillon
- Conflicts: First World War
- Awards: Médaille militaire, chevalier of the Legion of Honour

Sport
- Country: France
- Sport: Fencing

Achievements and titles
- Olympic finals: 1900 Summer

Félix Lucien Roger Debax (28 September 1864 – 25 August 1914) was a French army officer and Olympic fencer. Born in Toulouse, Debax entered the army as an officer-candidate at the age of 18. After service with the infantry (where he was promoted to the rank of captain), he became attached to the army gymnastics school (Ecole Normale de Gymnastique) in 1889. He was transferred back to the infantry for two years from 1893, before returning to the ecole. Debax remained a gymnastics teacher until 1901 during which time he competed as a fencer at the 1900 Summer Olympics in Paris.

After Debax left the ecole he was transferred to the infantry once again, though he published books on the teaching of gymnastics and fighting with the bayonet, and also studied at the Stockholm Gymnastics Institute. Promoted to chef de bataillon Debax was killed on 25 August 1914, fighting the German forces at Saint-Maurice-sous-les-Côtes during the first month of the First World War.

== Early career ==
Debax was born in Toulouse on 28 September 1864 at 21:00. He was the son of Gervais Achille Francois Alexandre Debax and Blanche Chemineau Debax. Debax joined the French Army in Toulouse on 24 October 1882, for an initial five-year commission, and seven days later became an officer cadet at the Ecole Spéciale Militaire de Saint-Cyr. He was promoted to corporal-cadet on 3 November 1883 and was commissioned as a sub-lieutenant in the 83rd Infantry Regiment on 1 October 1884. Debax was promoted to lieutenant in the 57th Infantry regiment on 29 February 1888.

== Army gymnastics instructor and Olympian ==
Debax became an instructor at the army's Ecole Normale de Gymnastique on 17 January 1889 before he was promoted to captain and posted out to the 34th Infantry Regiment on 26 December 1893. Debax returned to the Ecole Normale on 26 October 1895. He was appointed an officer of the Danish Order of the Dannebrog on 19 March 1898 and an officer of the French Ordre des Palmes Académiques on 22 January the same year. Debax remained on secondment to the Ecole Normale for some years, though his nominal home regiment changed to the 124th Infantry Regiment (from 22 October 1895), 150th Infantry Regiment (from 17 September 1897), 7th Infantry Regiment (from 29 September 1897) and the 1st Regiment of Zouaves (from 11 February 1900) in this time. He became a knight of the Swedish Order of the Sword on 2 May 1900 and an officer of the Turkish Order of Osmanieh on 4 October the same year. Debax competed in the individual foil fencing event at the 1900 Summer Olympics. He progressed from the first round and quarter-finals to finish fourth in the final pool in which he won four bouts and lost three.

== Later army career and death ==
Debax transferred out of the Ecole Normale and into the 18th Infantry Regiment as a captain on 12 October 1901. He was appointed a knight of the Spanish Order of Isabella the Catholic and a first class member of the Order of Military Merit on 14 December 1901. Debax was granted permission to study at the Gymnastics Institute in Stockholm on 4 October 1902. In 1905 he published the book L'Enseignement de la gymnastique dans l'armée (The teaching of gymnastics in the army). On 20 June 1906, Debax received a letter of commendation from the Minister of War, Eugène Étienne, for his work at Stockholm.

Debax later returned to the 18th Infantry Regiment and became their adjutant on 18 September 1906. On 30 May 1907 he was appointed a chevalier of the Legion of Honour and also received the French médaille militaire. Debax remained with the 19th Infantry Regiment until at least 1 June 1908, by which time he had been promoted to chef de bataillon, but by 1 December 1909 was serving with the 14th Infantry regiment. He published the book Étude sur l'escrime de combat à la baïonnette (A study on bayonet fighting) in 1913 and gave his rank as commandant. By 1 June 1914 Debax was with the 40th Infantry Regiment.

Upon the outbreak of the First World War he was chef de bataillon of the 240th Infantry Regiment. He was killed in action against German forces at Saint-Maurice-sous-les-Côtes, Meuse on 25 August 1914. His name is recorded on the war memorial at Falga near his birthplace. The Rue Félix Debax in Blagnac, near to Toulouse, is named after him.

== See also ==
- List of Olympians killed in World War I
