= Mauricio Álvarez de las Asturias Bohorques, 4th Duke of Gor =

Spanish fencer

The Duke of Gor GE
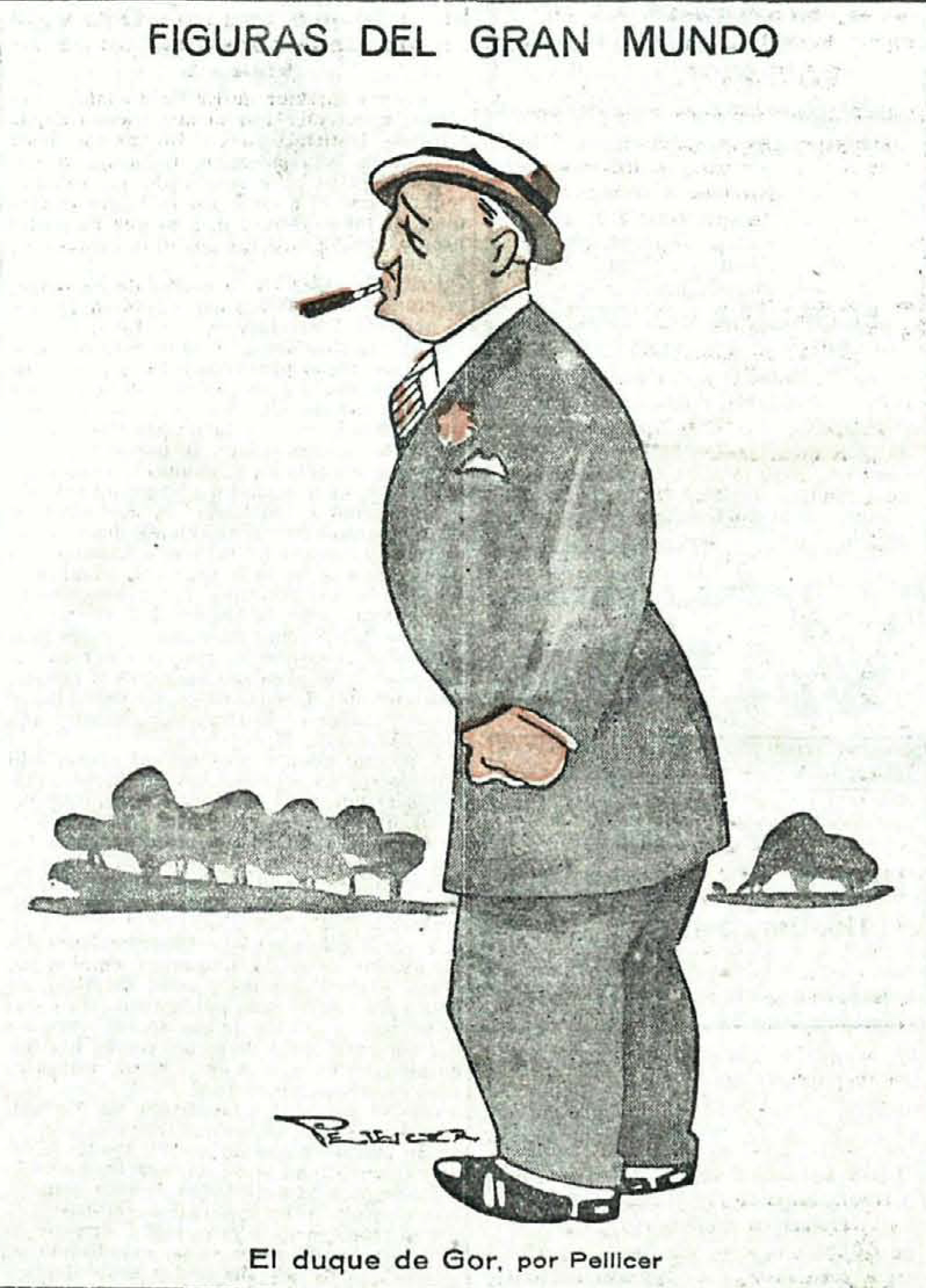

Personal information
- Born: 4 November 1864 Jerez de la Frontera, Spain
- Died: 24 February 1930 (aged 65) Madrid, Spain

Sport
- Sport: Fencing

Mauricio Álvarez de las Asturias Bohorques y Ponce de León, 4th Duke of Gor (4 November 1864 – 24 February 1930) was a Spanish Duke and fencer. He competed in the individual sabre, foil and Épée events at the 1900 Summer Olympics.

He was the 4th Duke of Gor, a peerage Grandee title in Spain.
