= Eugène Bergès =

French fencer

Eugène des Logis Berges
Sport
- Sport: Fencing

Eugène Bergès was a French fencer, and sub-officer maréchal des logis in French Army. He competed in the individual foil event at the 1900 Summer Olympics coming in 10th place.
