= André de Schonen =

French fencer and sport shooter

Personal information
- Born: Jean Jacques Joseph André de Schonen; 24 April 1869 Paris, Second French Empire
- Died: 8 December 1933 (aged 64) Eure-et-Loir, France

Sport
- Sport: Sports shooting, fencing

Jean Jacques Joseph André de Schonen (24 April 1869 – 8 December 1933) was an Olympic foil fencer and a pistol and Trapshooter at the 1900 summer games He also competed at the 1924 Summer Olympics in the rapid-fire pistol event.
