= Alphonse Kirchhoffer =

French fencer (1873–1913)

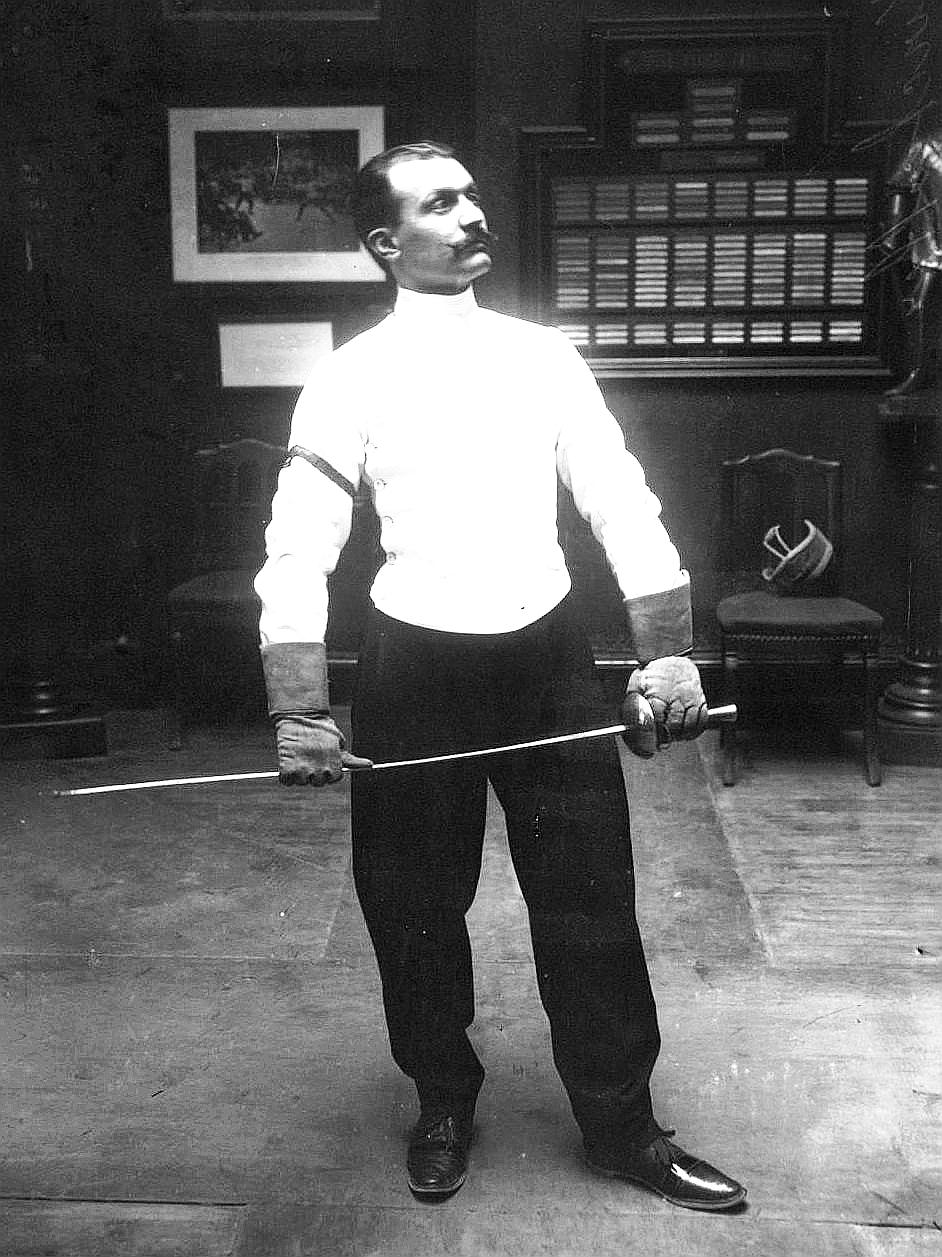
- Kirchhoffer (1908)

Medal record

Men's Fencing

Olympic Games
Silver medal – second place	1900 Paris	Masters foil

Simon Alphonse Kirchhoffer (December 19, 1873 in Paris – June 30, 1913 in Paris) was a French fencer who competed in the late 19th century and early 20th century.

He participated in Fencing at the 1900 Summer Olympics in Paris and won the silver medal in the master's foil. He was defeated by Lucien Mérignac in the final.

He would fall victim to a disease that would lead to amputation of both of his feet around 1911. He would then be made Knight of the french Legion of Honour.
