= Marcel Boulenger =

French fencer and writer

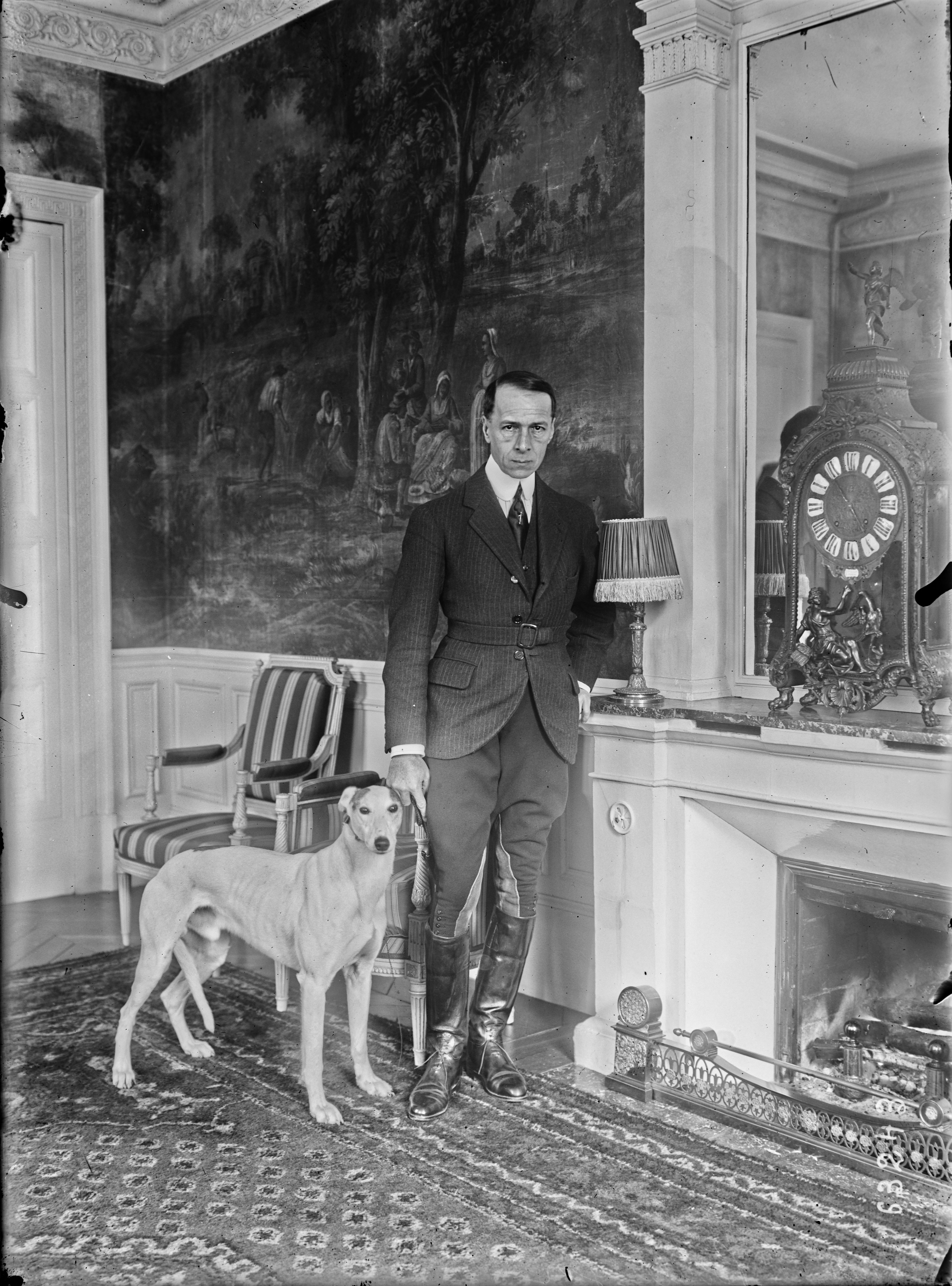
- Marcel Boulenger (1921)

Medal record

Representing France

Men's Fencing

Olympic Games
Bronze medal – third place	1900 Paris	Foil

Marcel Jacques Amand Romain Boulenger (Paris, 9 September 1873 – Chantilly, Oise, 21 May 1932) was a French novelist and fiction writer. He was awarded the Prix Nee of the Académie Française in 1918 and the Prix Stendhal in 1919. He was also a fencer of international standard, competing in the late 19th century and early 20th centuries.

== Writings ==
As an author he is primarily known for his pastiches and his many faux "autobiographies" of imaginary persons, for example the Souvenirs du marquis de Floranges (1811-1834) (1923), and Le Duc de Morny, prince franc̦ais (1925).

== Olympics ==
He competed in the fencing at the 1900 Summer Olympics in Paris and won the bronze medal in the foil, being defeated by fellow French fencer Henri Masson in the semi-final. Twelve years later he participated in the art competition at the Summer Olympics in Stockholm.

== Family ==
He was the brother of the journalist Jacques Boulenger.
