= Jean-Joseph Renaud =

French fencer

Jean Joseph-Renaud
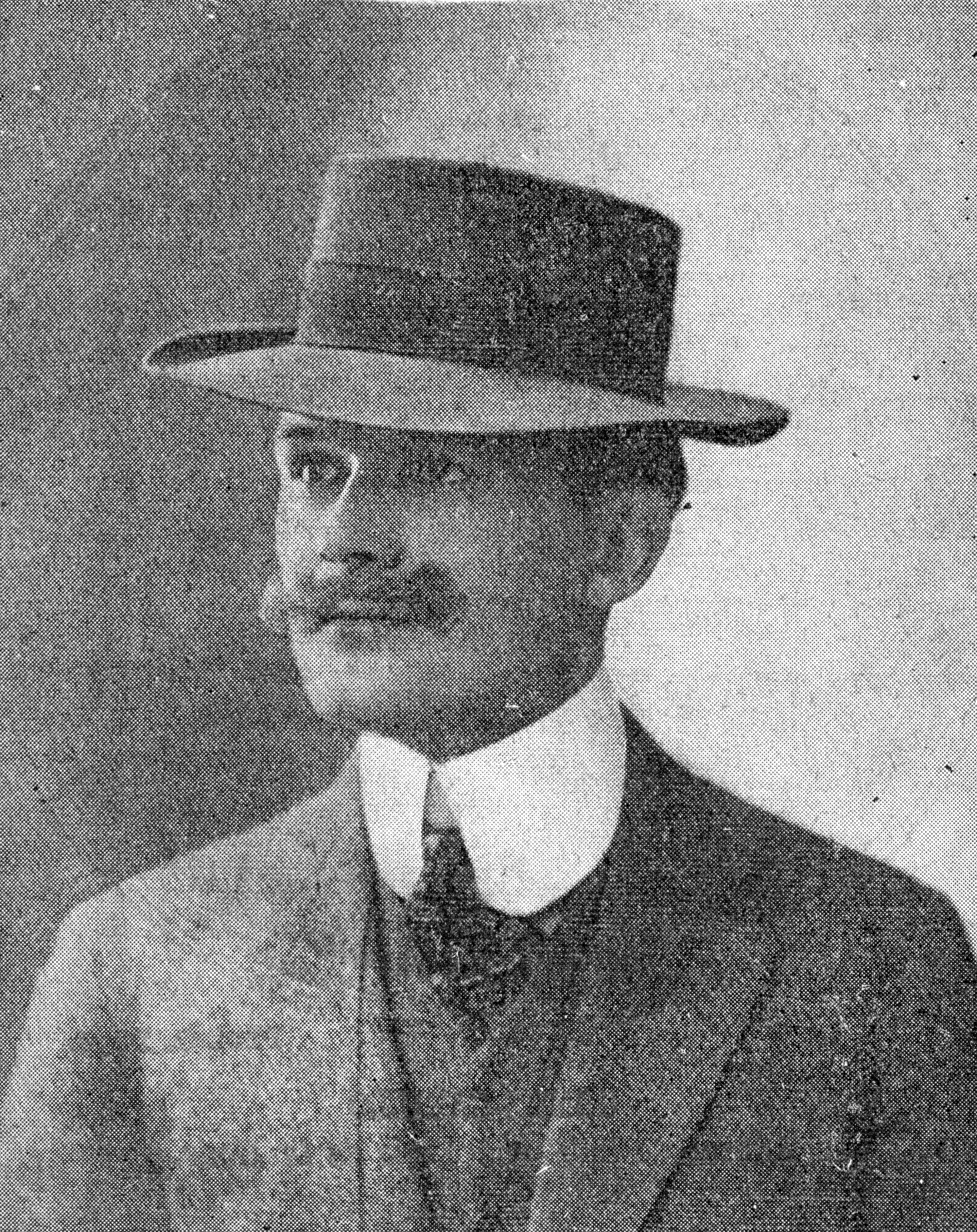

Personal information
- Born: 16 January 1873 Paris, France
- Died: 7 December 1953 (aged 80) Paris, France

Sport
- Sport: Fencing

Jean-Joseph Renaud (16 January 1873 – 7 December 1953) was a French épée and foil fencer. He competed at the 1900 Summer Olympics.

He was also a prolific journalist, author and playwright whose books La Défense dans la rue (Self Defence in the Street - 1912) and L'Escrime (Fencing - 1911) are recognised as an important contribution to early 20th century literature on those subjects. He was a proponent of the field of honor, saying: "From every point of view dueling is beneficent." He refereed many duels (including ones involving Clemenceau and Leon Blum) and fought at least 15 himself (being a fencing master, all but 4 were fought with pistols; he was victorious in all of them).

== Notes ==
Afternoon in the Attic, by John Kobler, copyright 1943-1950
