= Albert Cahen (fencer) =

French fencer (1877–1937)

Personal information
- Born: 12 July 1877 Paris, France
- Died: 20 December 1937 (aged 60) Paris, France

Sport
- Sport: Fencing

Albert Simon Cahen (12 July 1877 – 20 December 1937) was a French fencer. He competed in the individual foil and épée events at the 1900 Summer Olympics.
