= Henri Masson (fencer) =

French fencer (1872–1963)

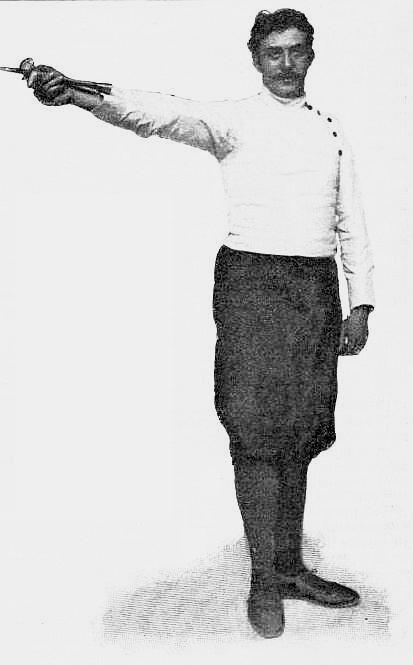

Medal record

Men's Fencing
Silver medal – second place	1900 Paris	Foil

Eugène Henri Masson (17 January 1872 in Paris – 17 January 1963 in Meudon) was a French fencer who competed in the late 19th century and early 20th century.

He participated in Fencing at the 1900 Summer Olympics in Paris and won the silver medal in the foil. He was defeated by fellow French fencer Émile Coste in the final.
