= Daunt =

Daunt is the surname of the following people

- Achilles Daunt (1832–1878), Irish churchman
- Ernest Daunt (1909–1966), Irish archdeacon
- James Daunt (born in 1963), British businessman
- John Daunt (1832–1886), British Victoria Cross recipient
- John Daunt (golfer) (1865–1952), British golfer
- Michael Daunt (1909–1991), British pilot test
- Seton Daunt, English guitarist
- Timothy Daunt (born in 1935), Isle of Man Lieutenant Governor
- Yvonne Daunt (1899–1962), dancer at the Paris Opera

== See also ==
- Daunt Books, British chain of bookshops
