= Golf at the 1900 Summer Olympics =

Golf at the Games of the II Olympiad
- Venue: Compiègne Club, Compiègne
- Date: 2–3 October 1900
- Competitors: More than 22 from 4 nations

The 1900 Summer Olympics took place in Paris, France. Two of the golf events that were contested in early October at the Compiègne Club, Compiègne as part of the Exposition Universelle, the men's and women's individual stroke play competitions, have since been afforded Olympic status. As such the 1900 games are recognised as the first time that golf was held in the Olympics.

== Format ==
The men's individual championship was a 36-hole stroke play amateur competition, while the women's championship was a 9-hole stroke play competition. Other golf competitions, not considered Olympic, that were held included handicap and putting competitions.

== Venue ==
The men's and women's event took place at the Compiègne Club, about 50 km (30 miles) north of Paris. The golf course was built in 1896 and was one of just 25 courses in France in 1900. It was designed by M.W. Freemantle and built within the horse racing track of Compiègne. The topography was flat, with dense rough surrounding the fairways and very tiny "postage stamp" sized greens.

== Tournament play ==
The men's tournament was played on 2 October 1900 where they played two 18-hole rounds back-to-back. The following day, 3 October 1900, the women's tournament began, where they only played 9 holes.

=== Men's championship ===
Charles Sands, representative of the St. Andrews Golf Club in Yonkers, New York finished the 36 hole tournament with 82+85=167 defeating Walter Rutherford of Jedburgh, Scotland by one stroke. In third place was David Robertson of Scotland.

=== Women's championship ===
The women's championship was a stage for many firsts that occurred in the Olympic games. Not only was this the first time women were ever able to compete in the Olympic games, the women's division was won by Margaret Abbott of Chicago Golf Club. Abbott shot a 47 to win and became the first ever American female to win a gold medal in the Olympic Games, though she received a gilded porcelain bowl as a prize instead of a medal. She is also the second overall American woman to receive an Olympic medal. Abbott's mother, Mary Abbott, also competed in this Olympic event and finished tied for seventh, shooting a 65. They were the first and only mother and daughter that have ever competed in the same Olympic event at the same time.

Abbott never knew that they were competing in the Olympics; she thought it was a normal golf tournament and died not knowing. Her historic victory was not known until University of Florida professor Paula Welch began to do research into the history of the Olympics and discovered that Margaret Abbott had placed first. Over the course of ten years, she contacted Abbott's children and informed them of their mother's victory.

=== Non-Olympic events ===
The men's handicap competition was won by American Albert Bond Lambert, with a score of 83−10=73 by two strokes from Pierre Deschamps of France, who scored 108−33=75.

== Medal summary ==
Medals were awarded to the top five finishers in each event; gold for the winner, vermeil for second, silver for third, silvered bronze for fourth, and bronze for fifth.

The top three in the men's and women's championships are considered Olympic medalists.

| Event | Gold | Silver | Bronze |
|---|---|---|---|
| Men's | Charles Sands; United States | Walter Rutherford; Great Britain | David Robertson; Great Britain |
| Women's | Margaret Abbott; United States | Pauline Whittier (USA); Switzerland (Note: In 2024, the IOC reinstated its original and current attribution policy for athletes at the early Olympic Games (1896–1904). From 2021 to 2024, the IOC briefly attributed medals in individual events according to the athlete's nationality, even when the athlete represented a foreign club or team. Since 2024, participation and medals have instead been attributed according to the national affiliation of the club or team represented by the athlete.) | Abbie Pratt (USA); France |

== Participating nations ==
22 golfers from 5 nations competed at the Paris Games, excluding handicapped and professional events:

- France (10)
- Great Britain (4)
- Greece (1)
- United States (6)
- Switzerland (1)

== Medal table ==
| Rank | Nation | Gold | Silver | Bronze | Total |
|---|---|---|---|---|---|
| 1 | United States | 2 | 0 | 0 | 2 |
| 2 | Great Britain | 0 | 1 | 1 | 2 |
| 3 | Switzerland | 0 | 1 | 0 | 1 |
| 4 | France | 0 | 0 | 1 | 1 |
| Totals (4 entries) | | 2 | 2 | 2 | 6 |

== See also ==
- List of Olympic medalists in golf
