= Demetrios Vikelas =

Greek businessman and writer (1835–1908)

His Excellency Demetrios Vikelas
- Δημήτριος Βικέλας
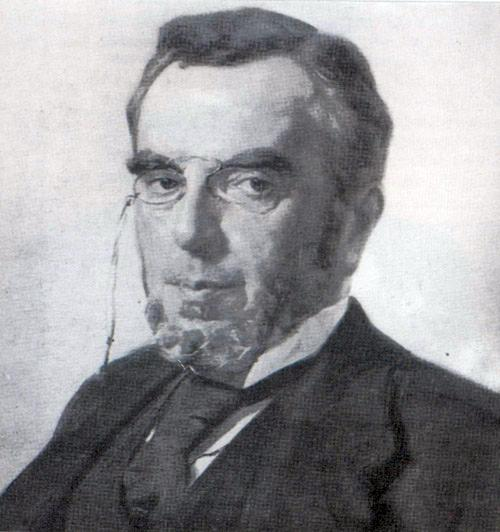

1st President of the International Olympic Committee
- In office 28 June 1894 – 10 April 1896
- Preceded by: Office established
- Succeeded by: Pierre de Coubertin

Personal details
- Born: 15 February 1835 Ermoupoli, Greece
- Died: 20 July 1908 (aged 73) Athens, Greece
- Spouse: Kalliope Geralopoulou (m. 1866)
- Occupation: Businessman; writer

Demetrios Vikelas (/vɪˈkɛlɑːs/; Greek: Δημήτριος Βικέλας [viˈcelas]; 15 February 1835 – 20 July 1908) was a Greek businessman and writer; he was the co-founder and first president of the International Olympic Committee (IOC), from 1894 to 1896.

After a childhood spent in Greece and Istanbul, he found fortune in London, where he married. He then moved to Paris, on account of his wife. Abandoning business, he dedicated himself to literature and history, and published numerous novels, short stories and essays, which earned him a distinguished reputation.

Because of his reputation and the fact that he lived in Paris, he was chosen to represent Greece in a congress called by Pierre de Coubertin in June 1894, which decided to re-establish the Olympic Games and to organise them in Athens in 1896, designating Vikelas to preside over the organising committee. After the Games were over, he stepped down, remaining in Athens until his death in 1908.

== Childhood ==
Vikelas was born in Ermoupoli, on the island of Syros in Greece. His father was a merchant, originally from Veria (then part of the Ottoman Empire, today capital of the northern Greek province of Imathia in Central Macedonia) and his mother, Smaragda, was a member of the rich Melas family. He was educated at home by his mother, possibly due to his fragile health.

When he was six, the family moved to Constantinople, and ten years after that to Odessa. There he started working for his father's business.

Already he showed signs of his literary potential. At the age of 17 he translated Esther, a tragedy by Jean Racine.

== London, from business to literature ==
While aged 17, in 1852, he left home to live in London with his uncles Leon and Vasileios Melas, where he worked for their business, Melas Bros, first as a bookkeeper and then as a partner. He also began to maintain a weekly correspondence with his mother.

This correspondence, which was kept, is one of the most important in establishing his biography. He also kept a journal in which he recorded not only facts about his daily life but also advice from his uncle Leon and his thoughts on books he had read and plays he was able to attend.

After his day's work at his uncles' business, he took evening classes at University College London (the only university in London which did not require students to be Anglican). There, he obtained a degree in botany (the only subject which offered evening classes). He learned German and Italian. He also took part in fencing, horse-riding and rowing, although circumstances did not allow him to keep these up. He had also become very scholarly, and started to publish — an anthology of poems in 1862 and numerous articles in London periodicals, on the British press and the growing of cotton in Greece.

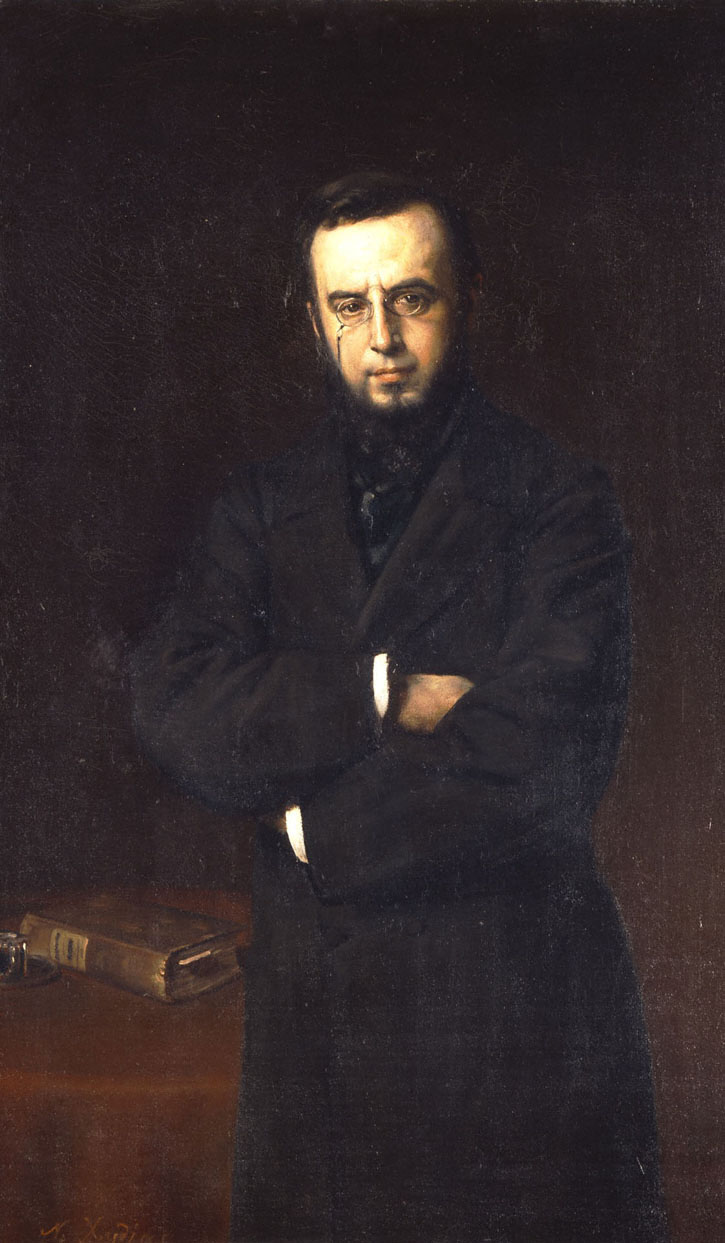
A portrait of Vikelas by Nikolaos Xydias Typaldos.

During the political events of 1863 in Greece, following the revolution which led to the eviction of Otto and the enthronement of George I, Vikelas led fundraising efforts in support of the provisional government. He also wrote letters to the main newspapers of the time to demand that Greece's rights be respected. He became definitively known in the British intellectual world in 1866 when he contacted authors and academics to gain their support for the Cretan cause during the Cretan revolt of 1866–1869, for which he raised more fundraising.

Also in 1866, he married Kalliope Geralopoulou, a young sister of Katerini, the wife of one of his uncles, also a member of a rich merchant family in London. He also became a titular partner in his uncles' business.

He also met and became friends with Charilaos Trikoupis, the son of the Greek ambassador to Britain Spyridon Trikoupis, himself destined to become Prime Minister of Greece. At the time they met, Charilaos Trikoupis was just starting his diplomatic and political career as an attaché, then chargé d'affaires, of the Greek legation. The two men kept a busy correspondence.

Demetrius Vikelas continued to gain favour in Greece — in 1868 he published a 30-page statistical article on the Kingdom of Greece following a conference at the Royal Statistical Society; in 1870 he founded a school for Greek children living in England. All his work — polemic, political, journalistic, historical or literary — had a double objective: to elevate the morals and level of intellect of his country but also to change its reputation with respect to the rest of the world. In his historical essay of 1874, On the Byzantines, he wrote that he wanted to restore the reputation of the Byzantine Empire.

In 1876, in the wake of the economic crisis that had started in 1873, and in order not to lose the profits of their work, Vikelas and his uncles dissolved their business (now called "Melas Bros - D. Vikelas"). He thus found himself in command of a comfortable fortune, which allowed him to fully dedicate his time to literature.

== Paris, the illness of his wife, and literature ==
In 1874, following the death of her father, Vikelas' wife Kalliope began to suffer from mental problems and showed a number of suicidal tendencies. The couple tried travelling to ease the illness. In Paris, following another scare, doctors declared Kalliope mad and she stayed for seven and a half months in Jules Bernard Luys' asylum in Ivry-sur-Seine. True to his character, Vikelas recorded the progress of his wife's mental health daily during the twenty years which followed.

In his journal, from 1872 Vikelas expressed the wish to move to Athens. In 1877, while Kalliope's condition was in remission, they took the opportunity to make the move. Vikelas started to build a home around the corner from the streets of Panepistimiou (on which the University was situated) and Voukourestiou. However, his wife's health worsened again and he accompanied her to France where she again stayed in Ivry-sur-Seine.

During his stays in Paris, Vikelas embarked on translating Shakespeare plays into Greek: King Lear, Romeo and Juliet and Othello during his wife's first stay (1878), and Macbeth and Hamlet during the second (1881). The public readings of his translations received an enthusiastic welcome in the literary community in Athens. He then also wrote his main literary work: Loukis Laras. The book first appeared in Athens as a series starting in 1879. The same year, it was translated into French and German. The French translation (which had its first republication in 1880) was included by the Education Minister Jules Ferry in the list of works which could be given as prizes to good students.

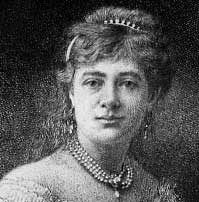
Juliette Adam

Vikelas spent the following fifteen years in Paris, building up contacts with the surrounding intellectuals and literati of the French capital. Consequently, Juliette Adam dedicated her anthology Poètes grecs contemporains ("Contemporary Greek poets"), published in 1881, to him, and he published in her Nouvelle Revue. He wrote for it, as before, numerous articles (on Byzantine history, Eastern issues and Greek political life), novels (a compendium in French and Greek came out in 1887) and even travel guides.

In the linguistic controversy in Greece between Katharevousa and Dimotiki, Vikelas chose the middle ground, rejecting the excesses of the Dimotikists just as much as the fierce defenders of the more intellectual language. He suggested using Katharevousa for parliamentary proceedings, for example, but popular language for poetry.

Between 1877 and 1892, he travelled, since at the worst of her crises, his wife could not bear his presence. He returned to Greece, visited Scotland, Switzerland, Spain and Constantinople.

In 1892, he bought a new plot in Athens (between the streets of Kriezotou and Valaoriti) where he built a new residence which was also his final home.

In 1893, he helped finance the construction of the Greek Orthodox church in Paris.

In May 1894, he received a request from the Pan-Hellenic Gymnastic Club, asking him to assist at a congress on amateurism convened the following month by Pierre de Coubertin. After hesitation, he agreed to represent the association. Following the congress it was decided to recreate the Olympic Games and to organise them in Athens.

Originally, it had been De Coubertin's idea to hold the first celebration of the modern Olympics in Paris in 1900, but Vikelas convinced him and the newly created International Olympic Committee that they should be held in Athens, in order to symbolically link them to the original Games. As the constitution of the IOC at that time required the IOC president to be from the country which would host the next Games, Vikelas became the IOC's first president.

== Permanent return to Greece ==
With his responsibility for the 1896 Summer Olympics, Vikelas returned to Greece for just ten days in autumn 1894. On October the 14th, he received a telegram from doctor Luys informing him that the condition of his wife had worsened. She had œdemas in her thighs, calves and stomach. She could no longer feed herself. He urgently returned to Paris. It seems that she then died.

In November 1894, a number of young nationalist officers, advocates of the Megali Idea, created a secret society, Ethniki Etairia, whose aim was to revive the morale of the country and prepare the liberation of Greek peoples still under the Ottoman Empire. In September 1895, they recruited civilians, all linked to the organisation of the Olympic Games, including Vikelas himself, although he claimed only to have given in to friendly pressure, playing a solely financial role and then quickly resigning from it. At this point he was still attracted by the possibility of rebuilding his country.

After the Games, which proved a success, Vikelas withdrew from the IOC, replaced as a member by the Count Alexander Mercati and as president by Coubertin. The defeat in the Greco-Turkish War which came soon after dealt a serious blow to his morale. He decided to leave Paris to move permanently to Athens. There he dedicated himself to popular education. In 1899 he founded the "Society for the Spread of Useful Books" in Athens, to help the country to recover from its defeat.

In 1905, he represented the University of Athens at the third Olympic Congress and seventh IOC Meeting in Brussels. He also remained an active member of the Hellenic Olympic Committee. He died in Athens on 20 July 1908 "from an afflicting illness".

He had been made a knight of the Legion of Honour on 31 December 1891, and honorary doctor of the University of St Andrews in November 1893 (the first Greek to receive this honour). He was a member (from 1874, and Vice-President from 1894) of the French "Association for the Promotion of Greek Studies", and of the Society for the Promotion of Hellenic Studies in London.

== Legacy ==
He left his immense library collection to the city of Heraklion in Crete, founding the Vikelaia Municipal Library.

Though in fact he did not live much of his life in Syros, the island counts him among its most well-known sons. Today, the Sports Center (Stadium) in Ermoupoli bears Demetrios Vikelas' name. The stadium seats 2000 people, and has an Olympic-size swimming pool, four tennis courts, two gym halls, basket and volleyball courts, track and field, floor football court and soccer field.

Also the Syros Island National Airport is named for him.

== The Olympic Movement ==
=== First Olympic Congress ===
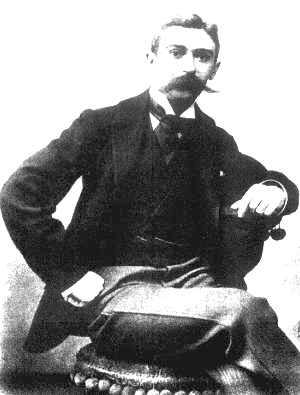
Pierre de Coubertin

Pierre de Coubertin had already attempted to restart the Olympic Games at the Congress for the fifth anniversary of the Union des Sociétés Françaises de Sports Athlétiques in 1892. While he may have raised the enthusiasm of the public, he did not manage to establish a proper commitment.

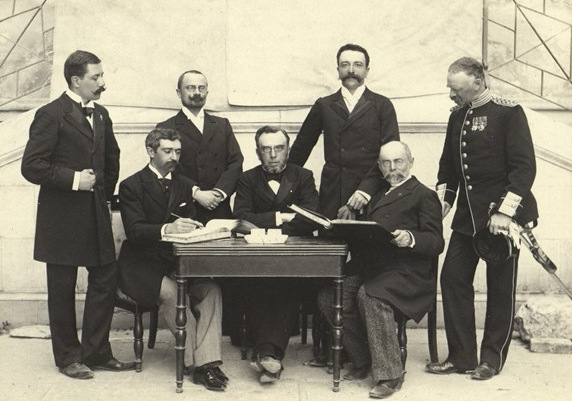
The International Olympic Committee at the first Olympic Games in Athens. Vikelas is seated in the center

He decided to reiterate his efforts at the Congress in 1894 which followed, which would openly address the issue of amateur sports, but also with the sub-text of the recreation of the Olympic Games. Six of the seven points which would be debated pertained to amateurism (definition, disqualification, betting, etc.) and the seventh on the possibility of restoring the Games. Coubertin also sought to give an international dimension to his congress. He gained support from several personalities: the King of the Belgians, the Prince of Wales, the Diadochus Constantine (hereditary prince of Greece) and William Penny Brookes, the founder of the "Olympian Games" in Shropshire, England, and Ioannis Phokianos. Phokianos was a professor of mathematics and physics and a college principal. Phokianos was also one of the propagators of sport in Greece and the organizer of an Olympic Games sponsored by Evangelis Zappas in 1875. In 1888, Phokianos organized an elite and private Games as the founder of the Pan-Hellenic Gymnastic Club. Phokianos could not travel to Paris for financial reasons and because he was finalizing the construction of his new college. He turned to one of the more eminent representatives of the Greek community in Paris, Demetrios Vikelas, to whom he wrote to ask him to take part in the Congress.

== Historical and literary works ==
=== Novels and short stories ===
- Poems, London, 1862.
- Loukis Laras; his main work, a historical, patriotic and moral novel. The style is naturalistic, as opposed to his heavy romantic works which were written as they were in Greece. It is written in simple language to make it accessible to a wider audience. The action unfolds as the Greek War of Independence enters Smyrna, Chios, Syros and the Cyclades. An old rich Greek merchant in London reflects on the adventures of his youth. The novel was published as a series from 1879 in the literary Athenian magazine Estia. The book was translated into eleven languages.
- Nouvelle grecques, translated by the Marquis de Queux de Saint-Hilaire, 1887.
  - "Philippe Marthas (Nouvelle grecque)" appeared in La Nouvelle Revue., September–October 1886. read at Gallica (French)
- Papa-Narcissus, novel, 1887
- Filippos Marthas, novel, 1887
- Tales of the Aegean, 1894

=== Books and historical articles ===
- Articles on Palaiologos, the last dynasty of the Byzantine Empire, in the Athenian journal Pandora, 1859-1860.
- On the Byzantines., London, 1874.
- "Les Grecs aux conciles de Bâle et de Florence.", La Nouvelle Revue., May–June 1882. read at Gallica (French)
- "La Grèce avant la révolution de 1821", La Nouvelle Revue., January–February 1884. read at Gallica (French)
- De Nicopolis à Olympie. Lettres à un ami., 1885. (following his correspondence with the Marquis de Queux de Saint-Hilaire)
- "The Byzantine Empire", Scottish Review, no. 8:16, October 1886.
- "Byzantism and Hellenism", Scottish Review, no. 9:17, janvier 1887.
- "The Subjects of the Byzantine Empire", Scottish Review, no. 9:18, April 1887.
- "Greece before 1821", Scottish Review, no. 13:26, April 1889.
- "The Formation of the Modern Greek State", Scottish Review, no. 14:27, July 1889.
- "L'Empereur Nicéphore Phocas", La Nouvelle Revue., July–August 1890. read at Gallica (French)
- Seven Essays on Christian Greece., 1890.
- "Le Philhellénisme en France.", Revue d'Histoire diplomatique., III, 1891.
- "La Littérature byzantine", Revue des deux mondes, March–April, 1892. read at Gallica (French)
- Grèce Byzantine et moderne., Firmin Didot, Paris, 1893.

=== Political and polemic works ===
- "Journalism in England", Eunomia (Athènes), 1864.
- "Statistics of the Kingdom of Greece", Journal of the Royal Statistical Society, no. 31, September 1868.
- Le Rôle et les aspirations de la Grèce dans la question d'Orient., Cercle Saint-Simon, Paris, 1885. read at Gallica (French)
- "Vingt-cinq années de règne constitutionnel en Grèce", La Nouvelle Revue., March–April 1889. read at Gallica (French)
- "The Territory of the Hellenic Kingdom", no. 14:28, October 1889.

=== Translations ===
He translated into Greek the stories of Hans Christian Andersen (for his nephews and nieces), and various Shakespeare plays.

== Notes ==
Civic offices
New title	President of the International Olympic Committee; 1894–1896	Succeeded by (France) Pierre de Coubertin
