= Dauntsey (disambiguation) =

Dauntsey is a village and parish in Wiltshire in the United Kingdom.

Dauntsey or Dauntesey may also refer to:

== People ==
- John Dauntsey (died 1391), English politician
- William Dauntesey or Dauntsey, 16th-century London merchant and Master of the Worshipful Company of Mercers

== Places in the United Kingdom ==
- Dauntsey Vale, vale in Wiltshire
- Dauntsey railway station, former station in Wiltshire
- Winterbourne Dauntsey, village in Wiltshire

== See also ==
- Daunt
- Dauntsey's School
