= Greece at the 1900 Summer Olympics =

- IOC code: GRE
- NOC: Committee of the Olympic Games

in Paris, France 14 May, 1900 – 28 October, 1900
- Competitors: 3 in 2 sports
- Medals: Gold 0 Silver 0 Bronze 0 Total 0

Summer Olympics appearances (overview)
- 1896; 1900; 1904; 1908; 1912; 1920; 1924; 1928; 1932; 1936; 1948; 1952; 1956; 1960; 1964; 1968; 1972; 1976; 1980; 1984; 1988; 1992; 1996; 2000; 2004; 2008; 2012; 2016; 2020; 2024; 2028

Other related appearances
- 1906 Intercalated Games

Greece, the previous host of the inaugural 1896 Summer Olympics in Athens, competed at the 1900 Summer Olympics in Paris, France. Three Greek competitors had four entries in three events spread over two disciplines. None of the Greek athletes won a medal.

== Competitors ==
The following is the list of number of competitors in the Games.

Sport	Men	Women	Total
Athletics	2	0	2
Golf	1	0	1
Total	3	0	3

== Athletics ==
Two Greek athlete competed in two throwing events in the athletics program, with Paraskevopoulos taking 4th and 5th place in the two events and Versis not recording a fair mark in his only event.

Field events

Athlete	Event	Qualification		Final	
Athlete	Event	Distance	Position	Distance	Position
Panagiotis Paraskevopoulos	Men's shot put	11.29	5	11.52	5
Sotirios Versis	Men's shot put	NM	—	Did not advance	
Panagiotis Paraskevopoulos	Men's discus throw	34.04	4	34.50	4
Sotirios Versis	Men's discus throw	DNS	—	Did not advance	

== Golf ==
Greece was one of four nations to compete in the first Olympic golf events.

Athlete	Event	Round 1	Round 2	Total	
Athlete	Event	Score	Score	Score	Rank
Alexandros Merkati	Men's	Unknown	Unknown	246	=11 (Note: Alexandros Merkati was born in Greece, but represented France at the 1900 Summer Olympics in golfing.)
