= Charles Louis de Frédy, Baron de Coubertin =

French painter

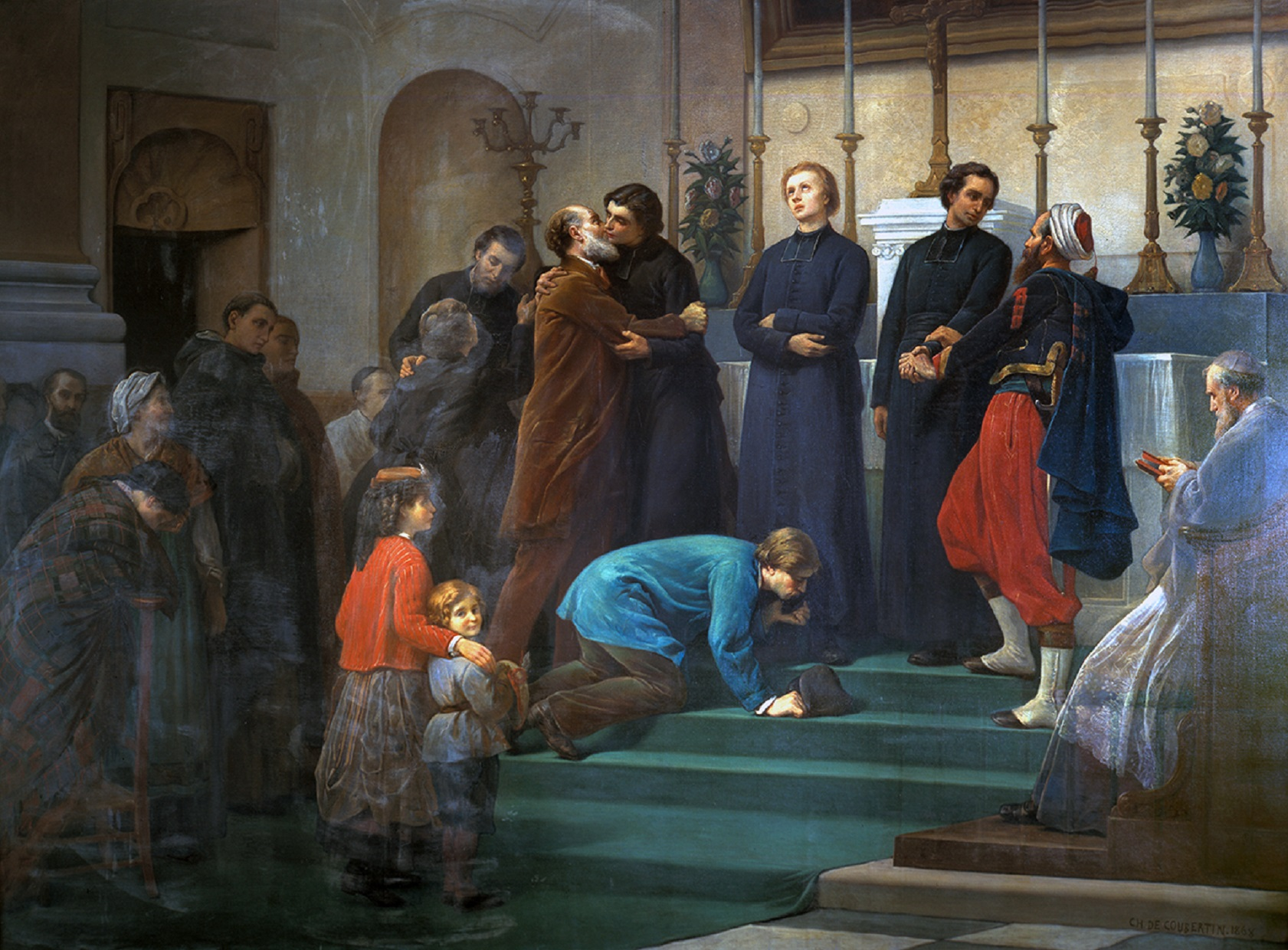
Departure ceremony at the Paris Foreign Missions Society. Le Départ, 1868, by Charles Louis de Frédy de Coubertin. The painting is in the Chapel of the Paris Foreign Missions Society at 128, Rue du Bac

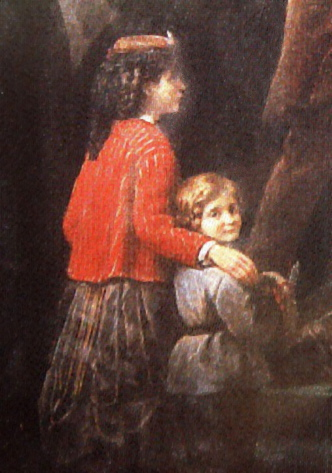
Pierre de Coubertin as a child, with one of his sisters, painted by his father Charles Louis de Frédy de Coubertin (detail of Le Départ, 1868).

Charles Louis de Frédy, Baron de Coubertin (1822–1908) was a French aristocrat and painter. He married a woman from Normandy, Agathe Marie Marcelle Gigault de Crisenoy, with whom he had four children. He was the father of Pierre de Coubertin, founder of the modern Olympic Games. He has been called "a mediocre if fashionable academic painter", and a "somewhat gifted painter of religious and historical subjects". In 1865 he received the Légion d'Honneur for his artistic work.
