= John Daunt =

Recipient of the Victoria Cross (1832-1886)

John Charles Campbell Daunt
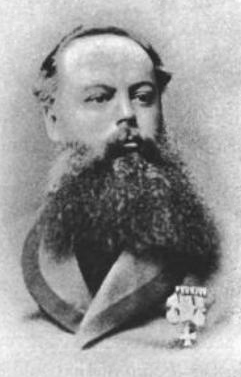
- Born: 8 November 1832; Autranches, Normandy, France
- Died: 15 April 1886 (aged 53); Bristol, England
- Burial place: Redland Green Parish Church Graveyard, Bristol
- Military career
- Allegiance: United Kingdom
- Branch: Bengal Army; British Indian Army
- Rank: Colonel
- Conflicts: Indian Mutiny; Second Anglo-Chinese War
- Awards: Victoria Cross

Colonel John Charles Campbell Daunt VC (8 November 1832 – 15 April 1886) was a recipient of the Victoria Cross, the highest and most prestigious award for gallantry in the face of the enemy that can be awarded to British and Commonwealth forces.

== Details ==
He was 24 years old, and a lieutenant in the 11th Bengal Native Infantry, Bengal Army during the Indian Mutiny when the following deed took place on 2 October 1857 at Ghota Behar, India for which he was awarded the VC:

Lieutenant Daunt and Serjeant Dynon are recommended for conspicuous gallantry in action, on the 2nd of October, 1857, with the Mutineers of the Ramgurh Battalion at Ghota Behar, in capturing two guns, particularly the last, when they rushed at and captured it by pistoling the gunners, who were mowing the detachment down with grape, one-third of which were hors de combat at the time,
Lieutenant Daunt is also recommended for chasing, on the 2nd of November following, the Mutineers of the 32nd Bengal Native Infantry across a plain into a rich cultivation, into which he followed them with a few of Rattray's Sikhs. He was dangerously wounded in the attempt to drive out a large body of these Mutineers from an enclosure, the preservation of many of his party, on this occasion, being attributed to His gallantry.

== Further information ==
He later achieved the rank of colonel. His VC is on display in the Lord Ashcroft Gallery at the Imperial War Museum, London. His son, John, represented Great Britain at the 1900 Summer Olympics in the men's golf tournament. His granddaughter Yvonne Daunt was a dancer with the Paris Opera in the 1920s.
