= Yvonne Daunt =

French dancer

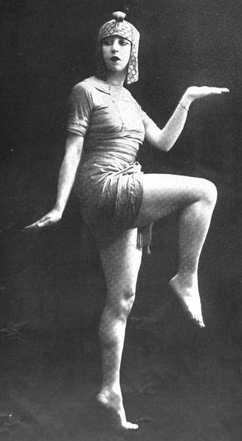
Yvonne Daunt, from a 1919 publication.

Yvonne Daunt (17 August 1899 – 26 April 1962) was a dancer with the Paris Opera in the 1920s. Daunt was made Etoile of the Paris Opera in 1920.

== Early life ==
Yvonne Rochefort Daunt was often described as Irish, and sometimes as Canadian or English, but she was born in Paris to parents who married in Australia. She was the daughter of John Hubert Edward Daunt and Winnifred Amy Travers Daunt. Her father, who played golf for Great Britain in the 1900 Summer Olympics in Paris, was an Englishman born in India, and her mother was born in Australia. Her grandfather, John Daunt, was a recipient of the Victoria Cross for his service in India.

== Career ==
Daunt was premiere danseuse caractere with the Paris Opéra. She joined the Opéra in 1918, and was featured in Ascanio (1921), Les Troyens (1921), Padmâvatî (1923), Castor et Pollux and Antar, in the last as a barefoot "Spirit of Fire". She replaced Ida Rubenstein in the title role of La Tragédie de Salomé in 1922, and danced in the ballet Frivolant in that same year. "She is a true artist," remarked one reviewer in 1919; "she displays much inspiration and a strong personality, as well as impecable [sic] technique." Her minimal costumes were considered "startling" in their day. In 1923 she presented a series of dances to the music and accompaniment of American composer Henry Cowell.

She left the Opéra in 1924, when she married. In the 1930s she lived in Sydney and taught dance. "I now realise that the success of my elevation work is due to the outdoor life I led as a young child," she told a newspaper in 1935, referring to the advantages of her Australian upbringing for a career in dance.

In Paris Yvonne Daunt knew Henri Matisse, who drew a portrait of her as a wedding gift in 1924. She was also a "great friend" of Anatole France during her Paris years.

== Personal life ==
Yvonne Daunt married twice. Her first husband was Allan Stein, nephew of Gertrude Stein. They had a son, Daniel, born in 1927. They divorced in 1930, and both remarried. Her second husband was Carleton Graves. Yvonne Daunt Graves died in 1962, aged 62 years. Her grave is with her second husband's in the San Francisco National Cemetery.

Her niece in Australia, Sybella Daunt Blencowe, commissioned a dance performance titled "Forgotten Interlude" in 2009, as a tribute to Daunt.
