= David Robertson (sportsman) =

Scotland international rugby union player & sportsman

- Born: David Donaldson Robertson; 21 March 1869 Shawlands, Scotland
- Died: 13 September 1937 (aged 68) Berkshire, England
- School: Haileybury School; Glasgow Academy
- University: Glasgow University; Christ's College, Cambridge
- Occupation: Solicitor

Rugby union career
- Position: Threequarters
Amateur team(s)
Years	Team	Apps	(Points)
- Cambridge University
International career
Years	Team	Apps	(Points)
1893	Scotland	1	(0)

David Donaldson Robertson (21 March 1869 – 13 September 1937) was a Scottish sportsman who represented Great Britain and Ireland at golf in the 1900 Summer Olympics, and also played international rugby for the Scotland.

== Personal history ==
Robertson was born in Shawlands, Glasgow, Scotland to William Alexander Robertson, a wine merchant. He was educated at Haileybury School in Hertfordshire before entering the Glasgow Academy; he later studied at Glasgow University before matriculating to Christ's College, Cambridge in 1889. He received his BA in 1893 and was called to the Bar at Lincoln's Inn in 1895.

With the outbreak of the First World War, Robertson joined the Royal Navy Volunteer Reserve, Anti-Aircraft Division.

Robertson died aged 68 in Idstone, Berkshire, England.

== Rugby career ==
Robertson first came to note as a rugby player when he represented Cambridge University in the 1892 Varsity match. The 1893 game was a huge disappointment after heavy rainfall turned the Queen's Club ground into mud. Although both teams came to the match with excellent reputations for exciting play, the game "degenerated into a scramble in the mud"; and the game ended in a nil-nil draw. While still representing Cambridge at club level, Robertson was selected Scotland for a rugby international against Wales as part of the 1893 Home Nations Championship. The Welsh used the four three-quarter tactic to great effect and Scotland were well beaten on their own ground, 9–0. The Scottish selectors acted angrily towards the back positions, making six changes. Robertson was one of those dropped, and never represented Scotland at rugby again.

== Golf career ==
Medal record

Men's golf

Representing Great Britain

Olympic Games
Bronze medal – third place	1900 Paris	Individual

In 1900 he won the bronze medal in the men's competition in golf at the Olympics.
