= Ernest Daunt =

Ernest George Daunt (10 January 1909 – 1 December 1966) was Archdeacon of Cork from 1962 until 1966.

Daunt was educated at Bandon Grammar School and Trinity College, Dublin; and ordained in 1933. After curacies in Dublin he held incumbencies at Balbriggan (1937–1946); Killiney, (1946–1950); Rathgar, (1950–1953); and St. Ann's Church, Dawson Street (1953-1962).

Religious titles
Preceded by Henry McAdoo	Dean of Cork; 1962–1966	Succeeded by Frederick Mervyn Kieran Johnston
