= Walter Rutherford (golfer) =

Scottish golfer

Personal information
- Full name: Walter Mathers Rutherford
- Nationality: Scotland
- Born: 23 September 1857 Crailing, Scotland
- Died: 15 October 1913 (aged 56) Crailing, Scotland

Career
- Sport: Golf
- Status: Amateur
Medal record
Representing Great Britain
Men's golf
Olympic Games
Silver medal – second place	1900 Paris	Individual

Walter Mathers Rutherford (23 September 1857 – 15 October 1913 in Jedburgh) was a Scottish golfer who competed in the 1900 Summer Olympics.

== Career ==
He won the silver medal in the men's competition with a score of 168 over 36 holes.

He was educated at Madras College in St Andrews. In later years he farmed land at Jedburgh and was a vocal proponent of land reform.
