= Pierre de Coubertin =

French educator and historian (1863–1937)

His Excellency The Baron de Coubertin
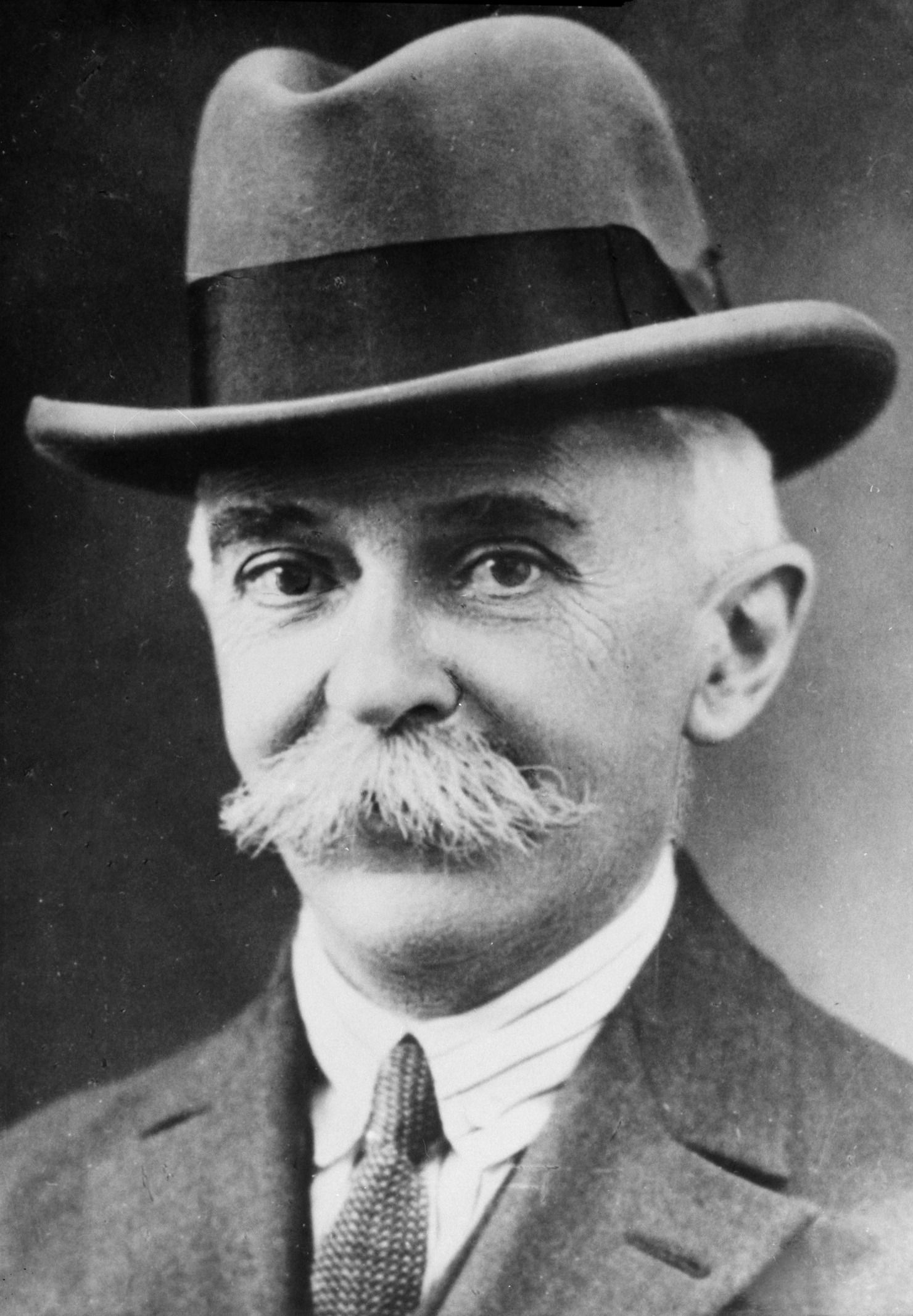
- Coubertin by the mid-1920s

2nd President of the International Olympic Committee
- In office 10 April 1896 – 28 May 1925
- Preceded by: Demetrios Vikelas
- Succeeded by: Henri de Baillet-Latour

Honorary President of the International Olympic Committee
- In office 28 May 1925 – 2 September 1937
- Preceded by: Position established
- Succeeded by: Vacant, next held by J. Sigfrid Edström (1952)

Personal details
- Born: Pierre de Frédy; 1 January 1863 Paris, France
- Died: 2 September 1937 (aged 74) Geneva, Switzerland
- Resting place: Bois-de-Vaux Cemetery
- Spouse: Marie Rothan (m. 1895)
- Children: 2
- Education: Paris Institute of Political Studies
- Pierre de Coubertin's voice Coubertin on the “philosophic foundation of modern Olympism”. Recorded in Geneva, c. 1935

Medal record

Representing Germany

Olympic Games

Art competitions
Gold medal – first place	1912 Stockholm	Literature

Charles Pierre de Frédy, Baron de Coubertin (French: [ʃaʁl pjɛʁ də fʁedi baʁɔ̃ də kubɛʁtɛ̃]; born Pierre de Frédy; 1 January 1863 – 2 September 1937), also known as Pierre de Coubertin and Baron de Coubertin, was a French educator and historian, co-founder of the International Olympic Committee (IOC), and its second president. He is known as the father of the modern Olympic Games. He was particularly active in promoting the introduction of sport in French schools.

Born into a French aristocratic family, Coubertin became an academic and studied a broad range of topics, most notably education and history. He graduated with a degree in law and public affairs from the Paris Institute of Political Studies (Sciences Po). It was at the Paris Institute of Political Studies that he came up with the idea of reviving the Olympic Games.

The Pierre de Coubertin World Trophy and the Pierre de Coubertin Medal are named in his honour.

== Early life ==
Pierre de Frédy was born in Paris on 1 January 1863, into an aristocratic family. He was the fourth child of Charles Louis de Frédy, Baron de Coubertin, and Marie-Marcelle Gigault de Crisenoy. Family tradition held that the Frédy name had originally arrived in France during the early 15th century, and the first recorded title of nobility granted to the family was given by Louis XI in 1477 to an ancestor, also named Pierre de Frédy, but other branches of his family tree delved even further into French history. The annals of both sides of his family included nobles of various stations, military leaders and associates of kings and princes of France.

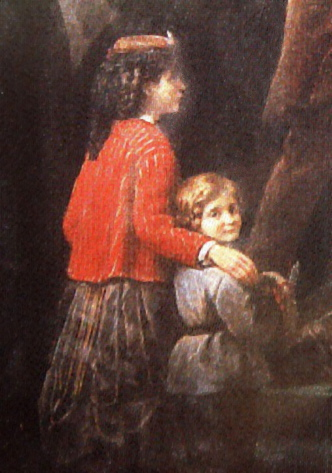
Pierre de Coubertin as a child (right), with one of his sisters, painted by his father (detail of Le Départ, 1868).

His father Charles was a staunch royalist and accomplished artist whose paintings were displayed and given prizes at the Parisian salon, at least in those years when he was not absent in protest of the rise to power of Napoleon III. His paintings often centered on themes related to the Catholic Church, classicism, and nobility, which reflected those things he thought most important. In a later semi-fictional autobiographical piece called Le Roman d'un rallié, Coubertin describes his relationship with both his mother and his father as having been somewhat strained during his childhood and adolescence. His memoirs elaborated further, describing as a pivotal moment his disappointment upon meeting Henri, Count of Chambord, whom the elder Coubertin believed to be the rightful king.

Coubertin grew up in a time of profound change in France – defeat in the Franco-Prussian War, the Paris Commune, and the establishment of the Third Republic – but while these events were the setting of his childhood, his school experiences were just as formative. In October 1874, his parents enrolled him in a new Jesuit school called Externat de la rue de Vienne, which was still under construction during his first five years there. While many of the school's attendees were day students, Coubertin boarded at the school under the supervision of a Jesuit priest, which his parents hoped would instill him with a strong moral and religious education. There, he was among the top three students in his class, and was an officer of the school's elite academy made up of its best and brightest. This suggests that despite his rebelliousness at home, Coubertin adapted well to the strict rigors of a Jesuit education. As was common in the French educational system at the time, Coubertin studied ancient Greece and Rome, which led to an appreciation of the Olympics at an early age.

As an aristocrat, Coubertin had a number of career paths from which to choose, including potentially prominent roles in the military or politics but he chose instead to pursue a career as an intellectual, studying and later writing on a broad range of topics, including education, history, literature and sociology.

== Educational philosophy ==
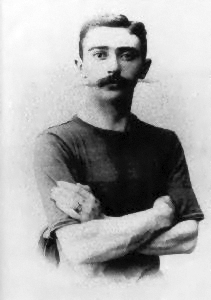
Coubertin in his middle-age.

The subject which he seems to have been most deeply interested in was education, and his study focused in particular on physical education and the role of sport in schooling. In 1883, at the age of twenty, he visited England for the first time and studied the program of physical education instituted under Thomas Arnold at the Rugby School. Coubertin admired Thomas Hughes's novel Tom Brown's School Days (published in 1857), which was set at the Rugby School. He referenced both the Rugby School and the novel as helping him to appreciate the role of athletics in education, saying that students who learn about fair play and morality on the sports field will be able to apply those lessons in various aspects of their adult life. He credited Arnold's methods with leading to the expansion of British power during the 19th century and advocated their use in French institutions. The inclusion of physical education in the curriculum of French schools would become an ongoing pursuit and passion of Coubertin.

Coubertin viewed Thomas Arnold as "one of the founders of athletic chivalry." However, the character-reforming influence of sport with which Coubertin was so impressed is more likely to have originated in the novel about Arnold's school rather than exclusively in the ideas of Arnold himself. Nonetheless, Coubertin was an enthusiast in need of a cause, and he found it in England and in Thomas Arnold. "Thomas Arnold, the leader and classic model of English educators," wrote Coubertin, "gave the precise formula for the role of athletics in education. The cause was quickly won. Playing fields sprang up all over England". He visited other English schools to see for himself. He described the results in a book, L'Éducation en Angleterre, which was published in Paris in 1888. The hero of his book is Thomas Arnold, and on his second visit in 1886, Coubertin reflected on Arnold's influence in the chapel at Rugby School.

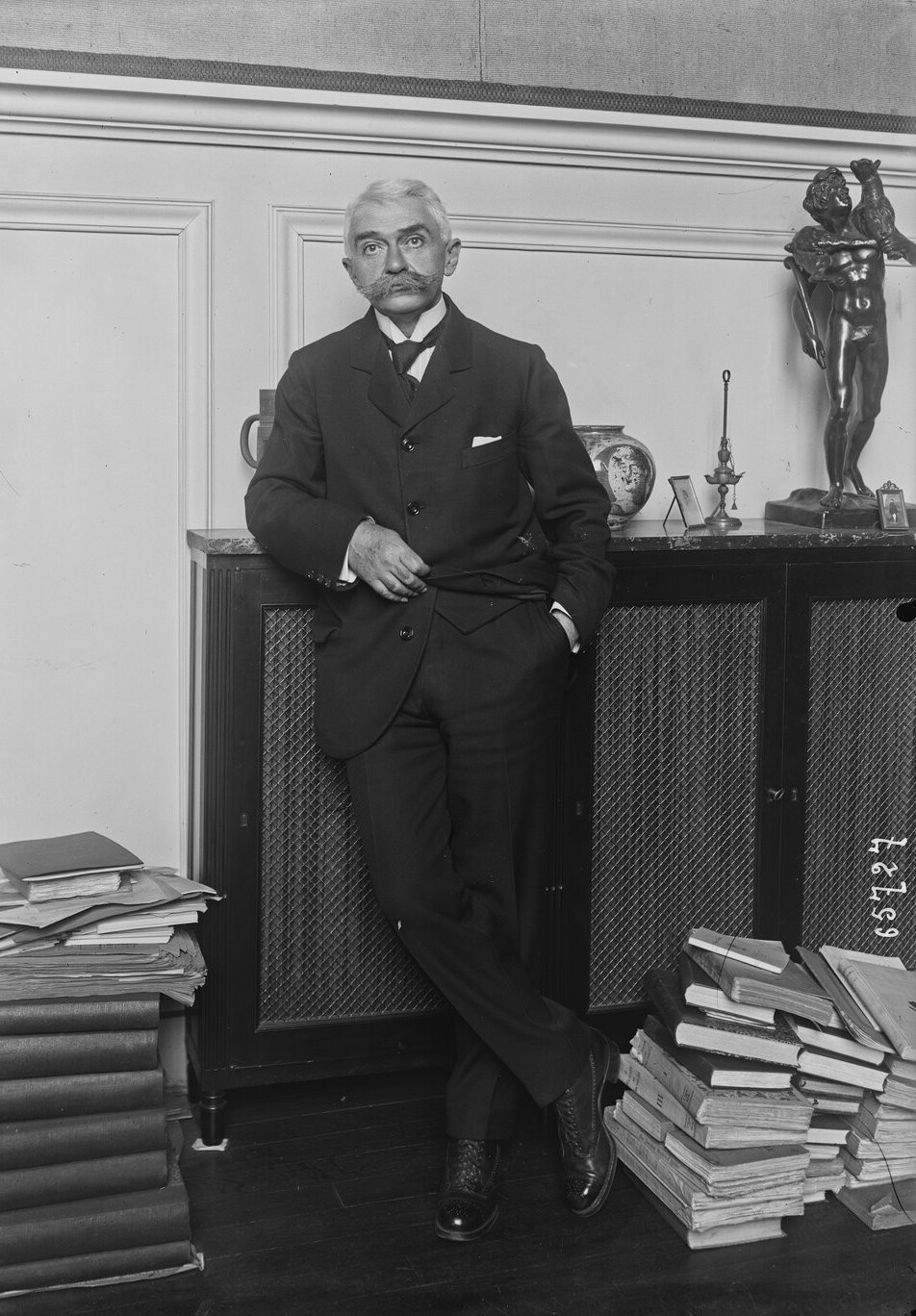
Coubertin in 1921.

What Coubertin saw on the playing fields of the English schools he visited was how "organised sport can create moral and social strength". Not only did organized games help to set the mind and body in equilibrium, it also prevented the time being wasted in other ways. First developed by the ancient Greeks, it was an approach to education that he felt the rest of the world had forgotten and to whose revival he was to dedicate the rest of his life.

As a historian and a thinker on education, Coubertin romanticized ancient Greece. Thus, when he began to develop his theory of physical education, he naturally looked to the example set by the Athenian idea of the gymnasium, a training facility that simultaneously encouraged physical and intellectual development. He saw in these gymnasia what he called a triple unity between old and young, between disciplines, and between different types of people, meaning between those whose work was theoretical and those whose work was practical. Coubertin advocated for these concepts, this triple unity, to be incorporated into schools.

While Coubertin was certainly a romantic, and while his idealized vision of ancient Greece would lead him later to the idea of reviving the Olympic Games, his advocacy for physical education was also based on practical concerns. He believed that men who received physical education would be better prepared to fight in wars, and better able to win conflicts like the Franco-Prussian War, in which France had been humiliated. He also saw sport as democratic, in that sports competition crossed class lines, although it did so without causing a mingling of classes, which he did not support.

Unfortunately for Coubertin, his efforts to incorporate more physical education into French schools failed. The failure of this endeavor, however, was closely followed by the development of a new idea, the revival of the ancient Olympic Games as a festival of international athleticism.

He was the referee of the first-ever French championship rugby union final on 20 March 1892, between Racing Club de France and Stade Français.

== Reviving the Olympic Games ==
Modern and redesigned Olympic flag.

Thomas Arnold, the head master of Rugby School, was an important influence on Coubertin's thoughts about education, but his meetings with William Penny Brookes also influenced his thinking about athletic competition to some extent. A trained physician, Brookes believed that the best way to prevent illness was through physical exercise. In 1850, he had initiated a local athletic competition that he referred to as "Meetings of the Olympian Class" at the Gaskell recreation ground at Much Wenlock, Shropshire. Along with the Liverpool Athletic Club, who began holding their own Olympic Festival in the 1860s, Brookes created a National Olympian Association which aimed to encourage such local competition in cities across Britain. These efforts were largely ignored by the British sporting establishment. Brookes also maintained communication with the government and sporting advocates in Greece, seeking a revival of the Olympic Games internationally under the auspices of the Greek government. There, the philanthropist cousins Evangelos and Konstantinos Zappas had used their wealth to fund Olympics within Greece, and paid for the restoration of the Panathinaiko Stadium that was later used during the 1896 Summer Olympics. The efforts of Brookes to encourage the internationalization of these games came to naught in his own lifetime before his death in 1895. However, Brookes did organize a national Olympic Games in London, at Crystal Palace, in 1866 and this was the first Olympics to resemble an Olympic Games to be held outside of Greece but while others had created Olympic contests within their countries, and broached the idea of international competition, it was Coubertin whose work would lead to the establishment of the International Olympic Committee and the organization of the first modern Olympic Games.

In 1888, Coubertin founded the Comité pour la Propagation des Exercises Physiques more well known as the Comité Jules Simon. Coubertin's earliest reference to the modern notion of Olympic Games criticizes the idea. The idea for reviving the Olympic Games as an international competition came to Coubertin in 1889, apparently independently of Brookes, and he spent the following five years organizing an international meeting of athletes and sports enthusiasts that might make it happen. In response to a newspaper appeal, Brookes wrote to Coubertin in 1890, and the two began an exchange of letters on education and sport. Although he was too old to attend the 1894 Congress, Brookes would continue to support Coubertin's efforts, most importantly by using his connections with the Greek government to seek its support in the endeavour. While Brookes' contribution to the revival of the Olympic Games was recognized in Britain at the time, Coubertin in his later writings largely neglected to mention the role the Englishman played in their development. He did mention the roles of Evangelis Zappas and his cousin Konstantinos Zappas, but drew a distinction between their founding of athletic Olympics and his own role in the creation of an international contest. However, Coubertin together with A. Mercatis, a close friend of Konstantinos, encouraged the Greek government to utilise part of Konstantinos' legacy to fund the 1896 Athens Olympic Games separately and in addition to the legacy of Evangelis Zappas that Konstantinos had been executor of. Moreover, George Averoff was invited by the Greek government to fund the second refurbishment of the Panathinaiko Stadium that had already been fully funded by Evangelis Zappas forty years earlier.

Coubertin's advocacy for the games centered on a number of ideals about sport. He believed that the early ancient Olympics encouraged competition among amateur rather than professional athletes, and saw value in that. The ancient practice of a sacred truce in association with the Games might have modern implications, giving the Olympics a role in promoting peace. This role was reinforced in Coubertin's mind by the tendency of athletic competition to promote understanding across cultures, thereby lessening the dangers of war. In addition, he saw the games as important in advocating his philosophical ideal for athletic competition: that the competition itself, the struggle to overcome one's opponent, was more important than winning. Coubertin expressed this ideal thus

"L'important dans la vie ce n'est point le triomphe, mais le combat, l'essentiel ce n'est pas d'avoir vaincu mais de s'être bien battu."

— French (original texts).

"The important thing in life is not the triumph but the struggle, the essential thing is not to have conquered but to have fought well."

— The texts adapted in English.

As Coubertin prepared for his Congress, he continued to develop a philosophy of the Olympic Games. While he certainly intended the Games to be a forum for competition between amateur athletes, his conception of amateurism was complex. By 1894, the year the Congress was held, he publicly criticized the type of amateur competition embodied in English rowing contests, arguing that its specific exclusion of working-class athletes was wrong. While he believed that athletes should not be paid to be such, he did think that compensation was in order for the time when athletes were competing and would otherwise have been earning money. Following the establishment of a definition for an amateur athlete at the 1894 Congress, he would continue to argue that this definition should be amended as necessary, and as late as 1909 would argue that the Olympic movement should develop its definition of amateurism gradually.

Along with the development of an Olympic philosophy, Coubertin invested time in the creation and development of a national association to coordinate athletics in France, the Union des Sociétés Françaises de Sports Athlétiques (USFSA). In 1889, French athletics associations had grouped together for the first time and Coubertin founded a monthly magazine La Revue Athletique, the first French periodical devoted exclusively to athletics and modelled on The Athlete, an English journal established around 1862. Formed by seven sporting societies with approximately 800 members, by 1892 the association had expanded to 62 societies with 7,000 members.

That November, at the annual meeting of the USFSA, Coubertin first publicly suggested the idea of reviving the Olympics. His speech met general applause, but little commitment to the Olympic ideal he was advocating for, perhaps because sporting associations and their members tended to focus on their area of expertise and had little identity as sportspeople in a general sense.

This disappointing result was the prelude to several challenges he would face in organizing his international conference. To develop support for the conference, he began to play down its role in reviving Olympic Games and instead promoted it as a conference on amateurism in sport which, he thought, was slowly being eroded by betting and sponsorships. This led to later suggestions that participants were convinced to attend under false pretenses. Little interest was expressed by those he spoke to during trips to the United States in 1893 and London in 1894, and an attempt to involve the Germans angered French gymnasts who did not want the Germans invited at all. Despite these challenges, the USFSA continued its planning for the games, adopting in its first program for the meeting eight articles to address, only one of which had to do with the Olympics. A later program would give the Olympics a much more prominent role in the meeting.

The congress was held on 23 June 1894 at the Sorbonne in Paris. Once there, participants divided the congress into two commissions, one on amateurism and the other on reviving the Olympics. A Greek participant, Demetrios Vikelas, was appointed to head the commission on the Olympics, and would later become the first President of the International Olympic Committee. Along with Coubertin, C. Herbert of Britain's Amateur Athletic Association and W.M. Sloane of the United States helped lead the efforts of the commission. In its report, the commission proposed that the Olympic Games be held every four years and that the program for the Games be one of modern rather than ancient sports. They also set the date and location for the first modern Olympic Games, the 1896 Summer Olympics in Athens, Greece, and the second, the 1900 Summer Olympics in Paris. Coubertin had originally opposed the choice of Greece, as he had concerns about the ability of a weakened Greek state to host the competition, but was convinced by Vikelas to support the idea. The commission's proposals were accepted unanimously by the congress, and the modern Olympic movement was officially born.

The proposals of the other commission, on amateurism, were more contentious, but this commission also set important precedents for the Olympic Games, specifically the use of heats to narrow participants and the banning of prize money in most contests.

Following the Congress, the institutions created there began to be formalized into the International Olympic Committee (IOC), with Demetrios Vikelas as its first president. The work of the IOC increasingly focused on the planning of the 1896 Athens Games, and de Coubertin played a background role as Greek authorities took the lead in logistical organization of the Games in Greece itself, offering technical advice such as a sketch of a design of a velodrome to be used in cycling competitions. He also took the lead in planning the program of events, although to his disappointment, polo, football, and boxing were not included in 1896.

The Greek organizing committee had been informed that four foreign football teams had entered, however none of them showed up in Athens, and despite Greek preparations for a football tournament it was cancelled during the Games.

The Greek authorities were also frustrated that he could not provide an exact estimate of the number of attendees more than a year in advance. In France, Coubertin's efforts to elicit interest in the Games among athletes and the press met difficulty, largely because the participation of German athletes angered French nationalists who begrudged Germany their victory in the Franco-Prussian War. Germany also threatened not to participate after rumors spread that Coubertin had sworn to keep Germany out, but following a letter to the Kaiser denying the accusation, the German National Olympic Committee decided to attend.

Coubertin himself was frustrated by the Greeks, who increasingly ignored him in their planning and who wanted to continue to hold the Games in Athens every four years, against de Coubertin's wishes. The conflict was resolved after he suggested to the King of Greece that he hold pan-Hellenic games in between Olympiads, an idea which the King accepted, although Coubertin would receive some angry correspondence even after the compromise was reached and the King did not mention him at all during the banquet held in honor of foreign athletes during the 1896 Games.

Coubertin took over the IOC presidency when Demetrios Vikelas stepped down after the Olympics in his own country. Despite the initial success, the Olympic movement faced hard times, as the 1900 Games (in De Coubertin's own Paris) and 1904 Games were both overshadowed by World's Fairs in the same cities, and received little attention.

Further to this, the Paris Games were organized by the organizing committee of the Exposition Universelle, who disagreed with de Coubertin's ideas and subsequently fired him, nor were they called Olympics at that time, while the St. Louis Games were predominantly American.

De Coubertin believed strongly that both art and sport should be featured at the Olympics, and in 1904, he wrote the following in the French newspaper Le Figaro: "The time has come to take the next step, and to restore the Olympiad to its original beauty. In the high times of Olympia, the fine arts were combined harmoniously with the Olympic Games to create their glory. This is to become reality once again."

=== President of the International Olympic Committee ===
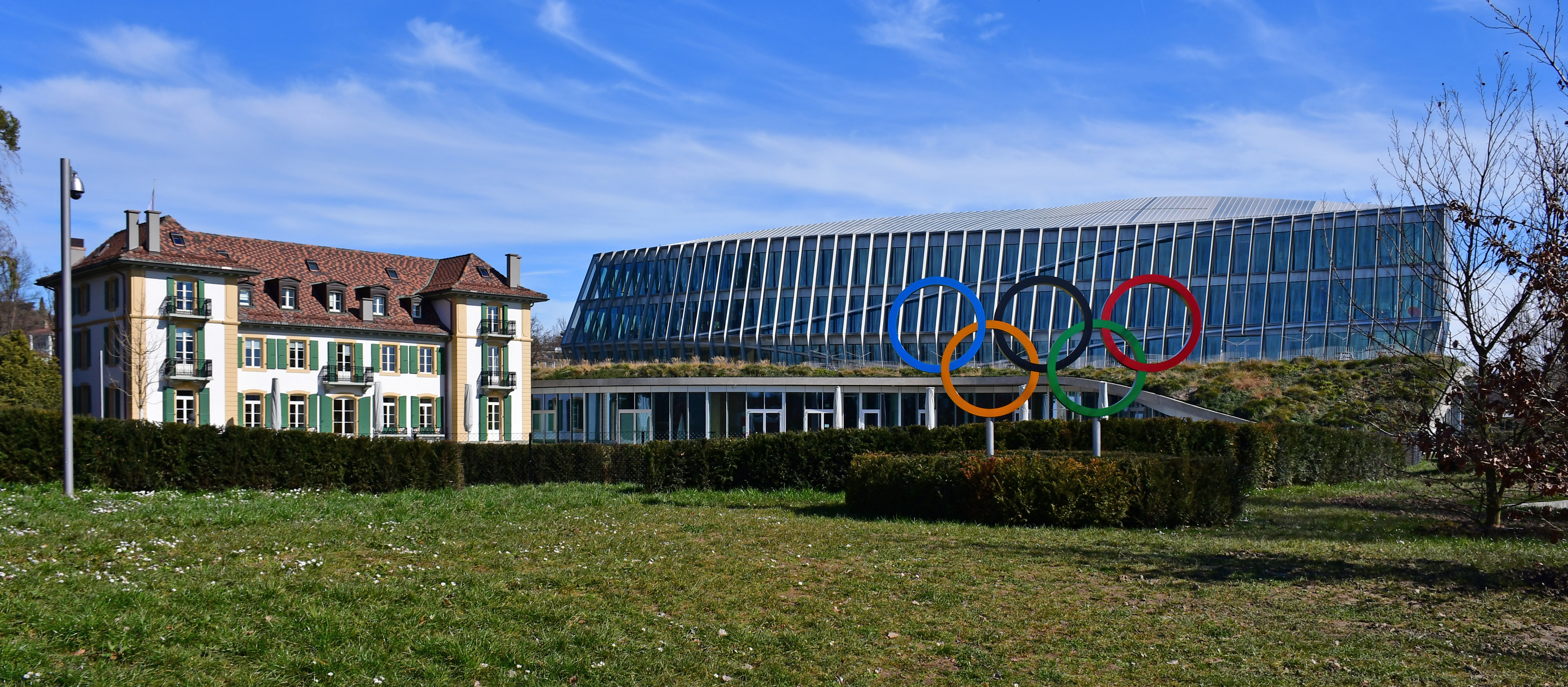
International Olympics Committee Headquarters.

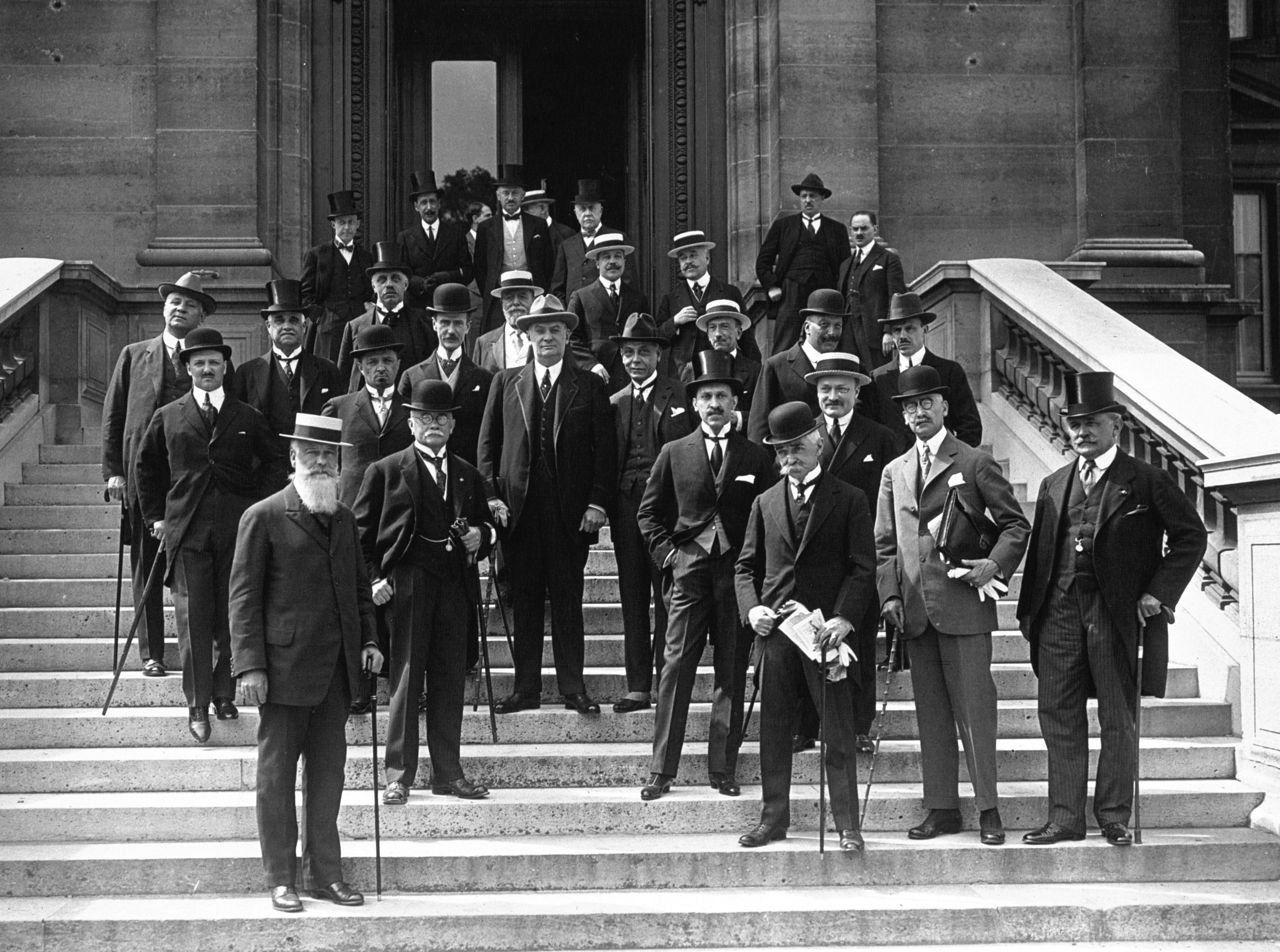
IOC members 1922

Coubertin became the second president of the IOC in 1896 with the Paris Olympics of 1900 being the first Games he oversaw as president. He made a major advancement for Olympic recognition by bringing hosting the 1906 Summer Olympics in Athens, which generated increased attention and participation at the Games. Since that time, the Olympic Games have come to be regarded as the world's foremost sports competition. Coubertin created the modern pentathlon for the 1912 Olympics, and subsequently stepped down from his IOC presidency after the 1924 Olympics in Paris, which proved much more successful than the first attempt in that city in 1900. He was succeeded as president, in 1925, by Belgian Henri de Baillet-Latour. During his tenure as president, Coubertin finally succeeded in having art competitions included as part of the Olympic Games, something he had advocated for since the founding of the IOC. Much of the funding for the IOC came from Coubertin personally. In fact, he depleted his wealth so much through these donations that he struggled financially at the end of his life.

Years later Coubertin came out of retirement to lend his prestige to assisting Berlin to land the 1936 games. In exchange, Germany nominated him for the Nobel Peace Prize. The 1935 winner, however, was the anti-Nazi Carl von Ossietzky.

=== Personal Olympic success ===
Coubertin won the gold medal for literature at the 1912 Summer Olympics for his poem "Ode to Sport," which was the first time the arts competitions were included at the Games. Coubertin entered the poem under the pseudonym of Georges Hohrod and M. Eschbach which were the names of villages close to his wife's place of birth. Below is an excerpt:

O Sport, delight of the Gods, distillation of life! In the grey dingle of modern existence, restless with barren toil, you suddenly appeared like the shining messenger of vanished ages, those ages when humanity could smile.

== Les Débrouillards ==
Following Francisco Amoros' ideas, De Coubertin developed a new type of utilitarian sport: "les débrouillards" (the "resourceful men") from 1900.

The first débrouillards season was organized in 1905/1906, and the program was wide: running, jumping, throwing, climbing, swimming, sword fighting, boxing, shooting, walking, horse riding, rowing, and cycling. (source: FFEPGV archives)

== Scouting ==
In 1911, Pierre de Coubertin founded the interreligious scouting organization aka Éclaireurs Français (EF) in France, which later merged to form the Éclaireuses et Éclaireurs de France.

== Personal life ==
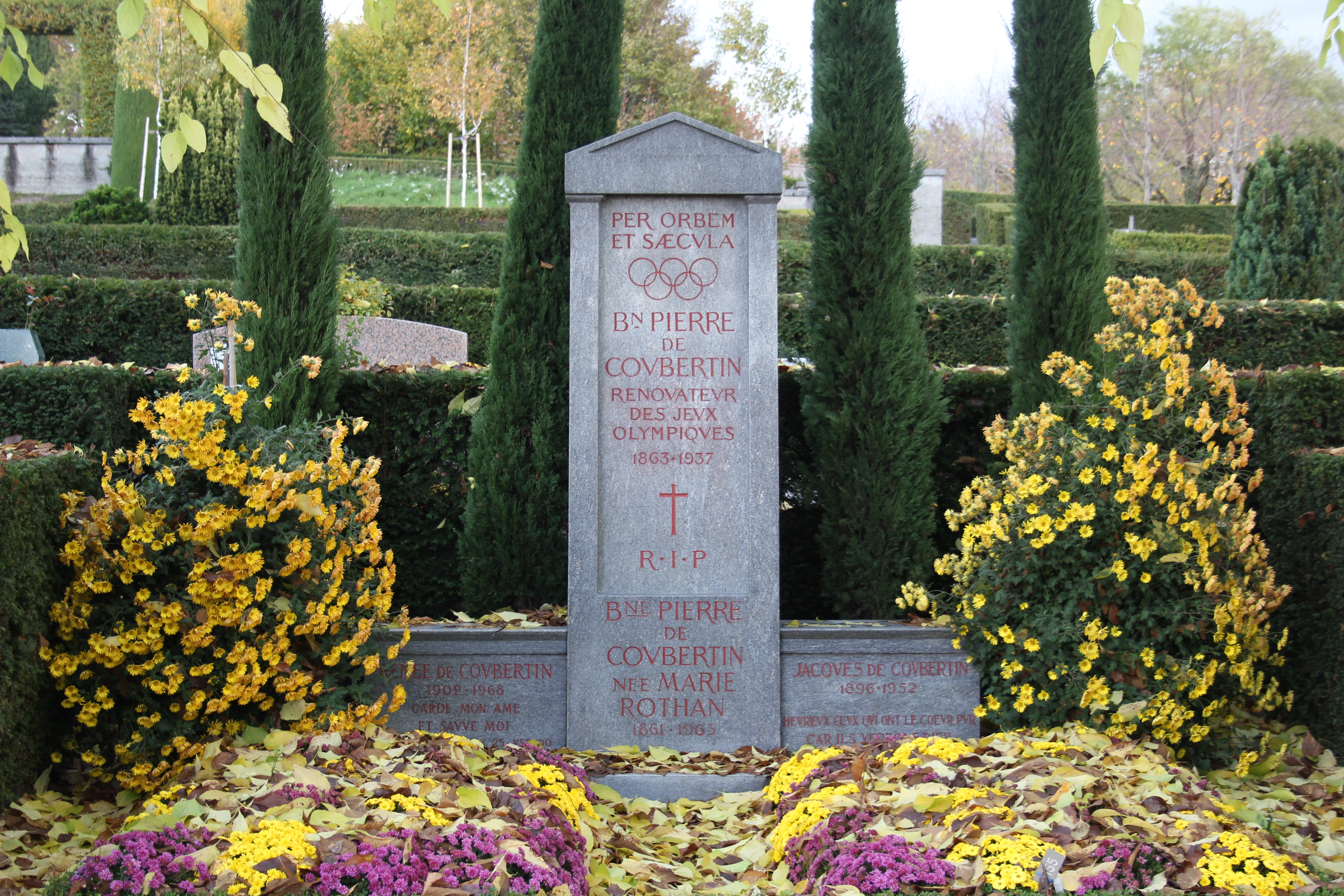
Grave of Pierre de Coubertin

In 1895, Pierre de Coubertin married Marie Rothan, the daughter of family friends. Their son Jacques (1896–1952) became sick after being in the sun too long when he was a little child. Their daughter Renée (1902–1968) suffered emotional disturbances and never married. Marie and Pierre tried to console themselves with two nephews, but they were killed at the front in World War I. Coubertin died of a heart attack in Geneva, Switzerland, on 2 September 1937 and was buried in Bois-de-Vaux Cemetery in Lausanne. Marie died in 1963.

One of the sports De Coubertin most liked was speed skating and skated himself during the time he lived in Lausanne at the lake.

At the 139th IOC Session around the 2022 Winter Olympics, French IOC member and Olympic gold medalist Guy Drut, informed the IOC of his proposal to have de Coubertin's remains reinterred at the Panthéon in time for the 2024 Summer Olympics. Drut stated that he had support from de Coubertin's family as well as French Academy member Érik Orsenna and had written to French President Emmanuel Macron. In response, IOC President Thomas Bach commented that he thought it was a "wonderful proposal" and "deserves to be successful", however, he doubted "the IOC could make any steps on this initiative which we appreciate considerably", yet wished him on behalf of the IOC "the best of success in getting this initiative to fruition." Drut announced that he had written to Macron "to propose the creation of a study commission for this project."

After his death, and according to his wish, his heart was taken to Olympia to rest in the memorial stele erected in his honor by the Greek government in 1937.

The stele is located in the Coubertin Grove of the International Olympic Academy. When the Olympic flame is lit in Olympia, the first torchbearer brings it to light the marble altar in the Coubertin Grove. The flame then goes onto Athens, and subsequently the host city.

=== Later life ===
Pierre de Coubertin was the last person to possess his family name. In the words of his biographer John MacAloon, "The last of his lineage, Pierre de Coubertin was the only member of it whose fame would outlive him."

== Criticism ==
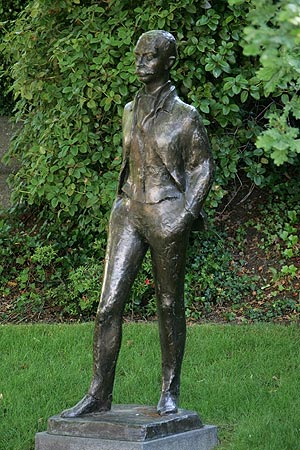
Statue at Lausanne

A number of scholars have criticized Coubertin's legacy. David C. Young believes that Coubertin's assertion that ancient Olympic athletes were amateurs was incorrect. The issue is the subject of scholarly debate. Young and others argue that the athletes of the ancient Games were professional, while opponents led by Pleket argue that the earliest Olympic athletes were in fact amateur, and that the Games only became professionalized after about 480 BC. Coubertin agreed with this latter view, and saw this professionalization as undercutting the morality of the competition.

Further, Young asserts that the effort to limit international competition to amateur athletes, which Coubertin was a part of, was in fact part of efforts to give the upper classes greater control over athletic competition, removing such control from the working classes. Coubertin may have played a role in such a movement, but his defenders argue that he did so unconscious of any class repercussions.

However, it is clear that Coubertin's romanticized vision of the ancient Olympic Games was fundamentally different from that described in the historical record. For example, his idea that participation is more important than winning ("L'important c'est de participer") is at odds with the ideals of the Greeks.

Coubertin's assertion that the games were the impetus for peace was also an exaggeration; the peace which he spoke of only existed to allow athletes to travel safely to Olympia, and neither prevented the outbreak of wars nor ended ongoing ones.

Scholars have critiqued the idea that athletic competition might lead to greater understanding between cultures and, therefore, to peace. Christopher Hill claims that modern participants in the Olympic movement may defend this particular belief, "in a spirit similar to that in which the Church of England remains attached to the Thirty-Nine Articles of Religion, which a Priest in that Church must sign." In other words, that they may not wholly believe it but hold to it for historical reasons.

Questions have also been raised about the veracity of Coubertin's account of his role in the planning of the 1896 Athens Games. Reportedly, Coubertin played little role in planning, despite entreaties by Vikelas. Young suggests that the story about Coubertin's having sketched the velodrome were untrue, and that he had in fact given an interview in which he suggested he did not want Germans to participate. Coubertin later denied this.

Coubertin also spoke against women's sports and the Women's World Games: "Impractical, uninteresting, unaesthetic, and we are not afraid to add: incorrect, such would be in our opinion this female half-Olympiad."

== Legacy ==
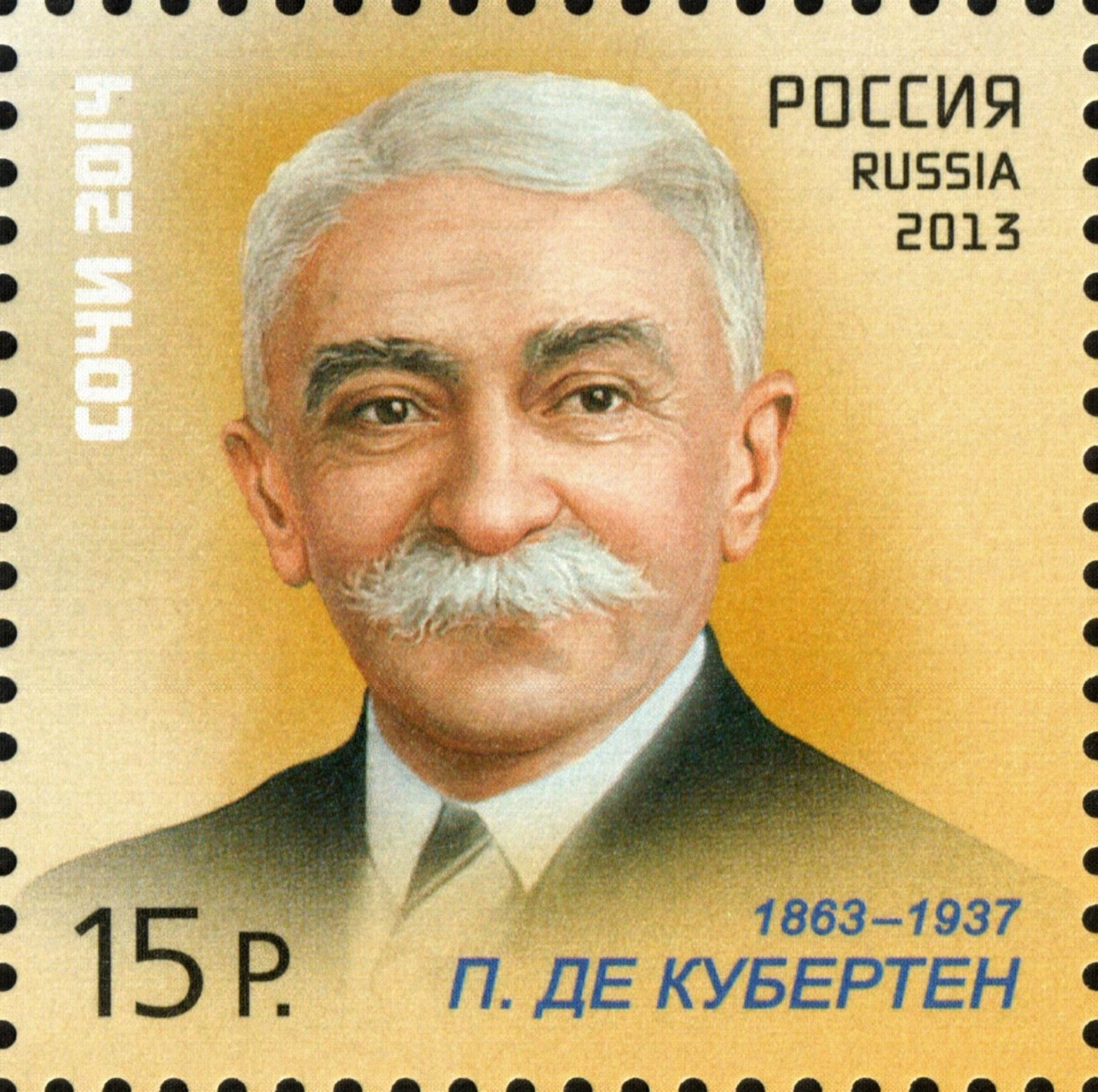
Pierre de Coubertin on a 2013 Russian stamp from the series "Sports Legends"

The traditional Olympic motto Citius, Altius, Fortius (Faster, Higher, Stronger) was proposed by Coubertin in 1894, and was official from 1924 until modified to the current Citius, Altius, Fortius – Communiter (Faster, Higher, Stronger – Together) in 2021. The traditional motto was coined by Henri Didon OP, a friend of Coubertin, for a Paris youth gathering of 1891.

The Pierre de Coubertin World Trophy given by the International Fair Play Committee has been awarded since 1965 for gestures of fair play in which an athlete impedes their performance to aid a fellow competitor.

The Pierre de Coubertin Medal is a special decoration awarded by the International Olympic Committee since 1997 that "pays tribute to institutions with a pedagogical and educational role and to people who, through their research and the creation of intellectual works in the spirit of Pierre de Coubertin, contribute to the promotion of Olympism."

A minor planet, 2190 Coubertin, was discovered in 1976 by Soviet astronomer Nikolai Stepanovich Chernykh and is named in his honour.

The street where the Olympic Stadium in Montreal is located (which hosted the 1976 Summer Olympic Games) was named after Pierre de Coubertin, giving the stadium the address 4549 Pierre de Coubertin Avenue. It is the only Olympic stadium in the world that lies on a street named after Coubertin. There are also two schools in Montreal named after Pierre de Coubertin.

He was portrayed by Louis Jourdan in the 1984 NBC miniseries, The First Olympics: Athens 1896.

In 2007, he was inducted into the World Rugby Hall of Fame for his services to the sport of rugby union.

== List of works ==
This is a listing of Pierre de Coubertin's books. In addition to these, he wrote numerous articles for journals and magazines:

- Une Campagne de 21 ans. Paris: Librairie de l'Éducation Physique. 1908.
- Coubertin, Pierre de (1900–1906). La Chronique de France (7 vols.). Auxerre and Paris: Lanier. pp. 7 v.
- L'Éducation anglaise en France. Paris: Hachette. 1889.
- L'Éducation en Angleterre. Paris: Hachette. 1888.
- Essais de psychologie sportive. Lausanne: Payot. 1913.
- L'Évolution française sous la Troisième République. Études d'histoire contemporaine. Paris: Hachette. 1896.
- France Since 1814. New York: Macmillan. 1900 – via Internet Archive.
- La Gymnastique utilitaire. Paris: Alcan. 1905.
- Histoire universelle (4 vols.). Aix-en-Provence: Société de l'histoire universelle. 1919.
- Mémoires olympiques. Lausanne: Bureau international de pédagogie sportive. 1931.
- Notes sur l'éducation publique. Paris: Hachette. 1901.
- Pages d'histoire contemporaine. Paris: Plon. 1908.
- Pédagogie sportive. Paris: Crés. 1922.
- Le Respect Mutuel. Paris: Alean. 1915.
- Souvenirs d'Amérique et de Grèce. Paris: Hachette. 1897.
- Universités transatlantiques. Paris: Hachette. 1890.

== See also ==
- Statue of Pierre de Coubertin, Tokyo

== Citations ==
Civic offices
Preceded by (Greece) Demetrios Vikelas	President of the International Olympic Committee; 1896–1925	Succeeded by (Belgium) Henri de Baillet-Latour (Switzerland) Godefroy de Blonay (Unofficial)
First	President of Organizing Committee for Winter Olympic Games; 1924	Succeeded by (Switzerland) Edmund Schulthess
Preceded by (Belgium) Henri de Baillet-Latour	President of Organizing Committee for Summer Olympic Games; 1924	Succeeded by (Netherlands) Solko van den Bergh
Preceded by Prince Constantine of Greece	President of Organizing Committee for Summer Olympic Games; 1900	Succeeded by (United States) David Rowland Francis
