= Frederick Johnston (priest) =

Frederick Mervyn Kieran Johnston (22 October 1911 – 13 November 2005) was the Archdeacon of Cork from 1959 until 1967 and Dean of Cork from then until 1986. He learned at Trinity College, Dublin, and was ordained in 1936. After curacies in Castlecomer and Cork, he held incumbencies at Kilmeen, Drimoleague, Blackrock and Moviddy.
