= Golf at the 1900 Summer Olympics – Men's individual =

Men's individual golf at the Games of the II Olympiad
- Golf pictogram
- Venue: Compiègne Golf Club
- Date: 2 October 1900
- Competitors: 12 from 4 nations
- Winning score: 167

Medalists
1st place, gold medalist(s)		Charles Sands; United States
2nd place, silver medalist(s)		Walter Rutherford; Great Britain
3rd place, bronze medalist(s)		David Robertson; Great Britain

A men's golf tournament was held at the 1900 Summer Olympics. It was the first of the three times such a tournament would be featured. There were 12 competitors from 4 nations. The event was won by Charles Sands of the United States. Great Britain took the next two spots, with Walter Rutherford finishing one stroke behind Sands and David Robertson in third at 8 strokes behind Sands.

== Background ==
In the preparation for the 1900 Games, a Special Advisory Committee led by Jacques de Pourtalès (a cousin of Hermann de Pourtalès, who along with his wife Hélène de Pourtalès won a gold medal in sailing in 1900) proposed a golf tournament be included given that the sport was popular in many countries (though not well known in France). The result was the first Olympic golf tournament, held at the Compiègne golf club. Divisions for both men and women, as well as a men's handicap division (not considered Olympic) were set.

Golf would be held again in 1904. In 1908, a dispute among the host nation's golfers resulted in all the British competitors boycotting and the event being cancelled. The sport would not be held again at the Olympics until 2016.

== Competition format ==
The men's event consisted of a 36-hole stroke play tournament. The scores for each of the 36 holes were summed to give a total for each player, with the lowest score winning. In the event of a tie, a replayed hole would be used.

== Schedule ==
Date	Round
Tuesday, 2 October 1900	Final

== Results ==
The men played two rounds (36 holes), summing the scores. The entire competition was held on 2 October.

Rank	Player	Nation	Round 1	Round 2	Total
1st place, gold medalist(s)	Charles Sands	United States	82	85	167
2nd place, silver medalist(s)	Walter Rutherford	Great Britain	Unknown		168
3rd place, bronze medalist(s)	David Robertson	Great Britain	Unknown		175
4	Frederick Taylor	United States	Unknown		182
5	John Daunt	Great Britain	Unknown		184
6	George Thorne	Great Britain	Unknown		185
7	William Dove	Great Britain	Unknown		186
8	Albert Bond Lambert	United States	94	95	189
9	Arthur Lord	United States	Unknown		221
10	Pierre Deschamps	France	Unknown		231
11	Alexandros Merkati	Greece	Unknown		246
12	J. Van de Wynckélé	France	Unknown		252

== Sources ==
- International Olympic Committee medal winners database
- De Wael, Herman. "Golf 1900". Full Olympians. Archived from the original on 28 February 2021.
- Mallon, Bill (1998). The 1900 Olympic Games, Results for All Competitors in All Events, with Commentary. Jefferson, North Carolina: McFarland & Company, Inc., Publishers. ISBN 0-7864-0378-0.
