= Alexandros Merkati =

Greek golfer

Personal information
- Nationality: Greek
- Born: 22 October 1874 Zakynthos, Greece
- Died: 5 April 1947 (aged 72) Athens, Greece

Sport
- Sport: Golf

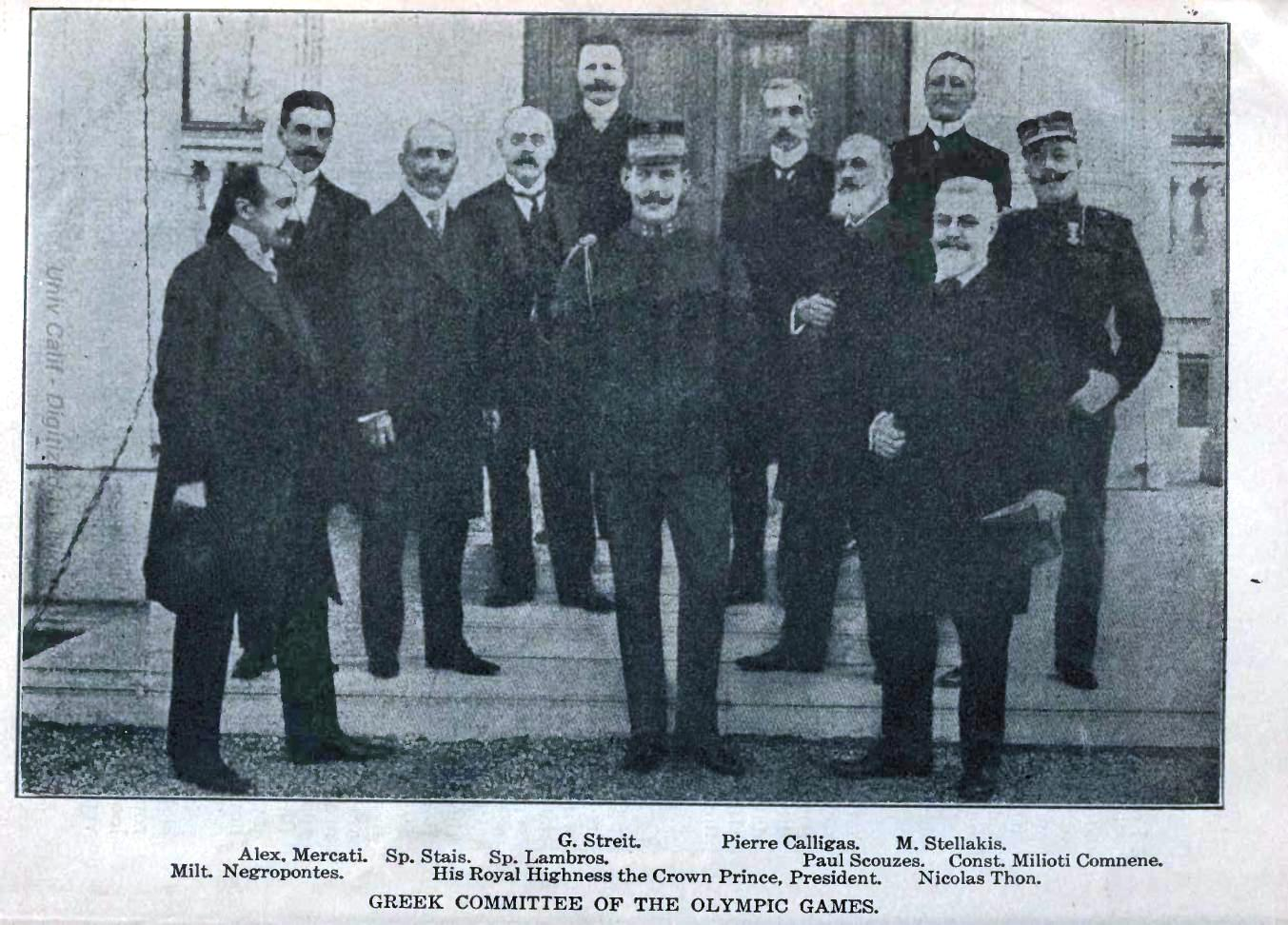
Olympic Committee, 1906

Alexandros, Count Merkati (22 October 1874 – 5 April 1947) was a Greek golfer. He competed in the men's individual event at the 1900 Summer Olympics.

Merkati introduced Pierre de Coubertin to Constantine I of Greece (then the crown prince), instrumental in providing Greek royal support to de Coubertin's idea of reviving the Olympic Games. Merkati was a secretary of the Organizing Committee for the 1896 Summer Olympics. He was a founding member of the Athens Lawn Tennis Club in 1895 and served as the club's President. He became a member of the International Olympic Committee in 1897. He was also a member of the Compiègne Club for golf, leading to Merkati having the opportunity to compete in the Games himself in 1900. He finished 11th of 12 in the first Olympic men's golf tournament, scoring 246 in the 36-hold stroke play tournament. (His mother-in-law, Abbie Pratt, played in the women's tournament, winning a bronze medal.) In 1906, he was a referee for football at the 1906 Intercalated Games.

Merkati served as secretary to Empress Elisabeth of Austria from 1896 to 1897 and later as royal Court Chamberlain to Constantine I of Greece and Alexander of Greece and Grand Marshal to the court of George II of Greece.

Following the Goudi coup in 1909, Merkati fled to the island of Zakynthos (his birthplace), fearing persecution against royalists such as himself. He continued to serve on the IOC during this exile, with de Coubertin's support against attempts by the Greeks to replace him with new members. At the VII Olympic Congress in Lausanne in 1921, Merkati proposed engraving the names of Olympic champions on plaques in the Olympic Stadium for the Games in which they had won. Merkati served on the IOC until 1925.
