= Albert Bond Lambert =

American golfer and aviator (1875–1946)

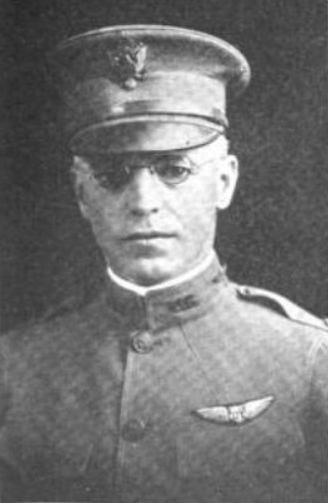

Personal information
- Born: December 6, 1875 St. Louis, Missouri, U.S.
- Died: November 12, 1946 (aged 70) St. Louis, Missouri
- Resting place: Bellefontaine Cemetery
- Education: Smith Academy at Washington University in St. Louis
- Children: George Lea Lambert, Albert Bond Lambert Jr.
- Parent: Jordan W. Lambert
Medal record
Men's golf
Representing United States
Olympic Games
Silver medal – second place	1904 St. Louis	Team

Albert Bond Lambert (December 6, 1875 – November 12, 1946) was an American businessman. He was the president of Lambert Pharmacal Company, marketer of Listerine, for over 25 years. Lambert was also a keen amateur golfer and prominent St. Louis aviator and benefactor of aviation.

== Early life ==
Lambert was the son of Jordan W. Lambert, founder of Lambert Pharmacal Company, which marketed Listerine. He initially studied at the University of Virginia and became president of the family business in 1896. Lambert became chairman in 1923 and stepped down three years later when the business was acquired by another firm.

== Golf ==
In October 1900, Lambert competed in the golf competitions held as part of the Exposition Universelle in Paris. He finished eighth in the men's championship competition, later classified as part of the 1900 Summer Olympics, and won the handicap competition.

Four years later, Lambert was part of the American team which won the silver medal, making him the only golfer to have competed in both Olympic golf tournaments prior to the sport's long hiatus from 1908 to 2016. Lambert finished 12th in this competition. In the individual competition, he finished eighth in the qualification and was eliminated in the quarter-finals of the match play.

== Aviation ==
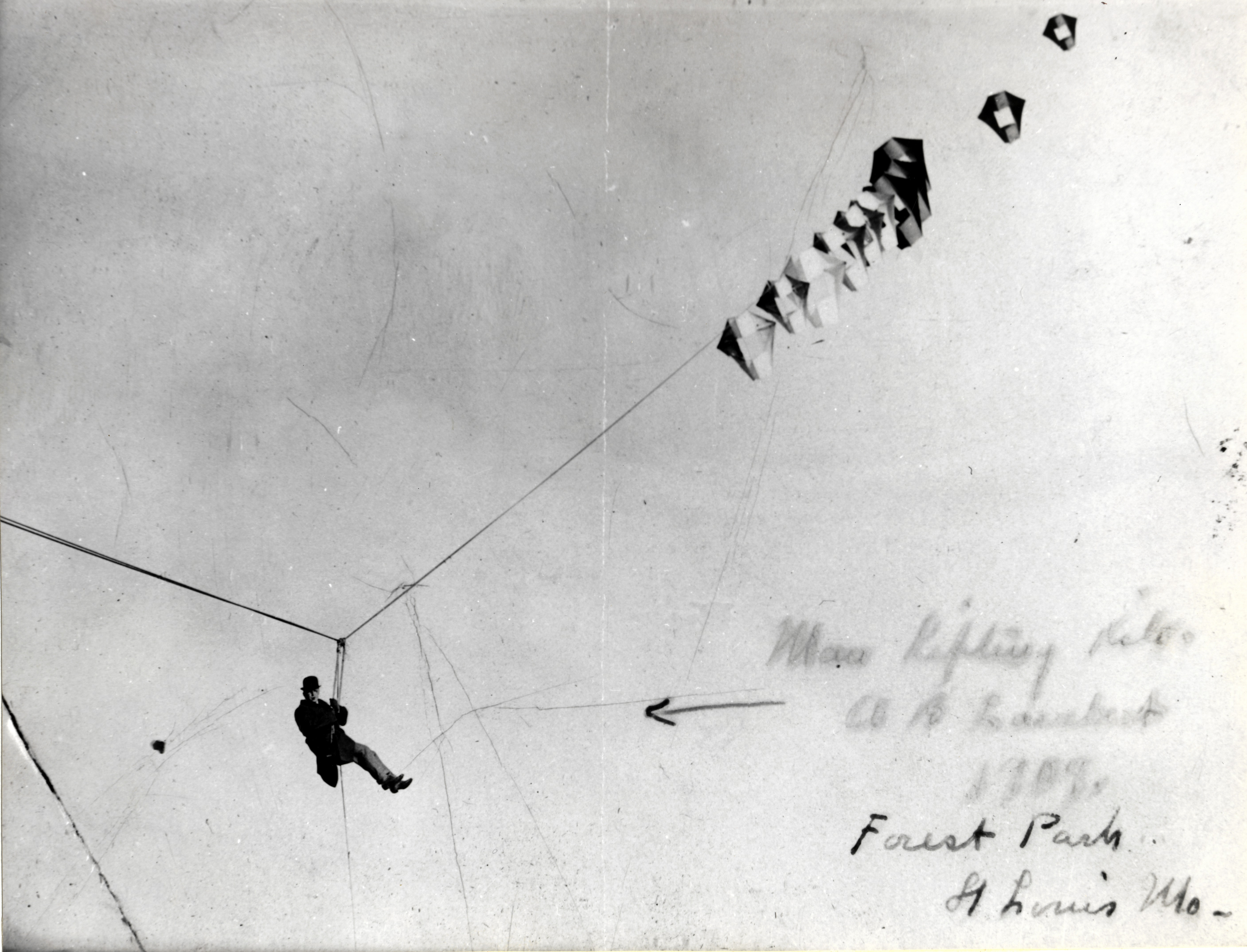
Lambert being lifted by a kite at the Forest Park airfield in 1908

In 1906, Lambert became interested in aviation and took ballooning lessons. The following year, he was one of the founders of the Aero Club of St. Louis. Lambert attended the Smith Academy at Washington University in St. Louis.

In 1909, Lambert met the Wright Brothers, and purchased his first airplane from them. Lambert took flying lessons from Orville Wright, and became the first St. Louis resident to hold a pilot's license two years later. During World War I, he organized and financed a training school in St. Louis for balloonists; the school was incorporated into the Army Signal Corps and moved to Texas. Lambert was commissioned as a major and served as the unit's commanding officer.

In 1926, a young Charles Lindbergh visited his home while looking for financial support for his proposed transatlantic flight. Lambert offered financial support to Lindbergh and encouraged others to do the same. In return for this support, Lindbergh's plane was named The Spirit of St. Louis.

In 1925, Lambert purchased Kinloch Field in Kinloch, Missouri, a 170-acre (0.69 km^{2}) field northwest of St. Louis for $68,000, which had been used for hot air balloon ascensions and the first international air meet. At his own expense, Lambert developed the field by adding hangars and a passenger terminal. In 1928, Lambert sold the airfield to the city of St. Louis for $68,000, the same price he had paid for it before making improvements. The St. Louis Lambert International Airport, of which he is the namesake, is located on the same site and was the first municipally owned airport in the country.

== Family ==
Lambert was married to Myrtle McGrew, daughter of the George F. McGrews of St. Louis. They had a daughter, Myrtle, and sons, Albert Bond Lambert Jr., Don L. Lambert and George Lea Lambert. George, a pilot instructor, died in an airplane accident on July 29, 1929, in St. Louis, Missouri.

== Residence ==
2 Hortense Place was the Lamberts' home in St. Louis, Missouri.

The Albert Bond Lambert House is a red-brick and symmetrical mansion which has a two-story portico with columns. The nearly 12,000 square foot Neoclassical-style home was designed by noted architect George W. Hellmuth and was built between 1902 and 1903. It has six bedrooms and eight bathrooms. Before construction, its cost was estimated to be $45,000 (equivalent to $1,674,519 in 2025). This home was constructed just before the 1904 World's Fair. The King of Sweden also visited this house with the fireplace in the solarium apparently being a gift from the king.
