= John Daunt (golfer) =

British golfer (1865–1952)

Personal information
- Full name: John Hubert Edward Daunt
- Nationality: British
- Born: 30 December 1865; Muzaffarpur, India
- Died: 16 July 1952 (aged 86); Kirribilli, New South Wales, Australia

Sport
- Sport: Golf

John Hubert Edward Daunt (30 December 1865 – 16 July 1952) was a British golfer. He competed in the men's individual event at the 1900 Summer Olympics. His father, Colonel John Charles Campbell Daunt, was a recipient of the Victoria Cross.
