= Bohemia at the 1900 Summer Olympics =

- IOC code: BOH
- NOC: Bohemian Committee for the Olympic Games

in Paris, France May 14, 1900 – October 28, 1900
- Competitors: 7 in 4 sports and 9 events
- Medals Ranked 20th: Gold 0 Silver 1 Bronze 1 Total 2

Summer Olympics appearances (overview)
- 1900; 1904; 1908; 1912

Other related appearances
- 1906 Intercalated Games –––– Czechoslovakia (1920–1992); Czech Republic (1994–pres.)

Bohemia competed in the Summer Olympic Games for the first time at the 1900 Summer Olympics in Paris, France as an independent team, though it was part of Austria-Hungary at the time. 7 athletes competed for Bohemia.

== Medalists ==
The following competitors won medals at the games. In the discipline sections below, the medalists' names are bolded. Medals awarded to participants of mixed-NOC teams are represented in italics. These medals are not counted towards the individual NOC medal tally.

Medal	Name	Sport	Event	Date
Silver	František Janda-Suk	Athletics	Men's discus throw	July 15
Bronze	Hedwig Rosenbaum	Tennis	Women's singles	July 11
Bronze	Hedwig Rosenbaum	Tennis	Mixed doubles	July 11

Medals by sport
Sport	1st place, gold medalist(s)	2nd place, silver medalist(s)	3rd place, bronze medalist(s)	Total
Athletics	0	1	0	**1**
Tennis	0	0	1	**1**
Total	0	1	1	2

== Competitors ==
The following is the list of number of competitors in the Games.

Sport	Men	Women	Total
Athletics	4	0	4
Cycling	1	0	1
Gymnastics	1	0	1
Tennis	0	1	1
Total	6	1	7

== Athletics ==
Track & road events

Athlete	Event	Heat		Semifinal		Repechage		Final	
Athlete	Event	Time	Rank	Time	Rank	Time	Rank	Time	Rank
Václav Nový	100 m	Unknown	3	Did not advanced					
Karel Nedvěd	400 m	DNS		—N/a				Did not advanced	
Ondřej Pukl	800 m	Unknown	4-5	—N/a				Did not advanced	
Ondřej Pukl	1500 m	—N/a						Unknown	7-9
Karel Nedvěd	110 m hurdles	DNS		—N/a		Did not advanced			
Karel Nedvěd	400 m hurdles	Unknown	3	—N/a				Did not advanced	

Field events

Athlete	Event	Qualification		Final	
Athlete	Event	Distance	Position	Distance	Position
Václav Nový	Men's standing triple jump	—N/a		DNS	
**František Janda-Suk**	Men's discus throw	35.04	2	35.14	2nd place, silver medalist(s)

== Cycling ==
Bohemia competed in the second Olympic cycling competition. The nation's only cyclist, František Hirsch, had little success.

=== Sprint ===
Athlete	Event	Qualification		Quarterfinals	Semifinals	Final	
Athlete	Event	Time	Rank	Opposition Time	Opposition Time	Opposition Time	Rank
František Hirsch	Men's sprint	Unknown	4-8	Did not advance			

== Gymnastics ==
Athlete	Event	Final	
Athlete	Event	Score	Rank
František Erben	All-Around	249	=32

== Tennis ==
Rosenbaumová took bronze in the women's singles. Rosenbaumová also won another bronze medal in the mixed doubles with British playing partner Archibald Warden.

Athlete	Event	Quarterfinals	Semifinals	Final	
Athlete	Event	Opposition Score	Opposition Score	Opposition Score	Rank
**Hedwig Rosenbaum**	Women's singles	Bye	Prévost (FRA); **L** 1–6, 1–6	Did not advance	3rd place, bronze medalist(s)
**Hedwig Rosenbaum (BOH)**; Archibald Warden (GBR)	Mixed doubles	Gillou / Verdé-Delisle (FRA) **W** 6–3, 3–6, 6-2	Prévost (FRA) / Mahony (GBR); **L** 3–6, 0-6	Did not advance	3rd place, bronze medalist(s)
