= Bohemia at the Olympics =

- IOC code: BOH
- NOC: Czech Olympic Committee
- Medals Ranked 130th: Gold 0 Silver 1 Bronze 3 Total 4

Summer appearances
- 1900; 1904; 1908; 1912

Other related appearances
- 1906 Intercalated Games –––– Czechoslovakia (1920–1992); Czech Republic (1994–pres.)

The Kingdom of Bohemia, an autonomous part of Austria-Hungary until 1918, competed at some of the early modern Olympic Games. The Bohemian Committee for the Olympic Games was founded and recognized by the International Olympic Committee in 1899. The team made its debut at the 1900 Summer Olympics. After World War I, Bohemia became part of the new Czechoslovakia, and Bohemian athletes competed for Czechoslovakia at the Olympics. After the 1992 Summer Olympics and the dissolution of Czechoslovakia into the Czech Republic and Slovakia in 1993, Bohemian athletes competed for the Czech Republic at the Olympics. If these post-war appearances are counted, Bohemia has missed only three Olympics: the inaugural 1896 Summer Olympics, the 1904 Summer Olympics (the first held outside Europe) and as Czechoslovakia, the 1984 Summer Olympics which were boycotted by the USSR and its satellites.

== Timeline of participation ==
Olympic Years	Teams	
1900–1912	Bohemia	as part of Hungary
1920–1992	Czechoslovakia	
1994–present	Czech Republic	Slovakia

== Medal tables ==
Flag used by the Bohemian team at the 1912 Olympic Games

=== Medals by Summer Games ===
Games	Athletes	Gold	Silver	Bronze	Total	Rank
(France) 1900 Paris	7	0	1	1	2	19
(United States) 1904 St. Louis	did not participate					
(United Kingdom) 1908 London	19	0	0	2	2	17
(Sweden) 1912 Stockholm	43	0	0	0	0	–
Total		0	1	3	4	130

=== Medals by sport ===
Sport	Gold	Silver	Bronze	Total
Athletics	0	1	0	1
Fencing	0	0	2	2
Tennis	0	0	1	1
Totals (3 entries)	0	1	3	4

== List of medalists ==
Medal	Name	Games	Sport	Event
Silver	František Janda-Suk	1900 Paris	Athletics	Men's discus throw
Bronze	Hedwiga Rosenbaumová	1900 Paris	Tennis	Women's singles
Bronze	Vilém Goppold von Lobsdorf	1908 London	Fencing	Men's sabre
Bronze	Vlastimil Lada-Sázavský; Vilém Goppold von Lobsdorf; Bedřich Schejbal; Jaroslav Šourek-Tuček	1908 London	Fencing	Men's team sabre

Hedwiga Rosenbaumová also won a bronze medal with Archibald Warden of Great Britain (GBR) in the mixed doubles event in tennis at the 1900 Summer Olympics. This medal is attributed to a mixed team instead of split between Bohemia and Great Britain.

== Summary by sport ==
=== Athletics ===
Bohemia first competed in track and field athletics in the nation's debut in 1900, sending 4 athletes who competed in five events. They won a silver medal, the best result of any event at any Games for Bohemia, which never won a gold medal and no other silver medals.

Games	Athletes	Events	Gold	Silver	Bronze	Total
1900 Paris	4	5/23	0	1	0	1
Total			0	1	0	1

=== Cycling ===
Bohemia's debut in 1900 included one cyclist. Bohemia did not win any medals in cycling.

Games	Cyclists	Events	Gold	Silver	Bronze	Total
1900 Paris	1	1/3	0	0	0	0
Total			0	0	0	0

=== Gymnastics ===
Bohemia's Olympic debut in 1900 included one gymnast, František Erben, who placed 32nd of 135 in the men's all-around.

Games	Gymnasts	Events	Gold	Silver	Bronze	Total
1900 Paris	1	1/1	0	0	0	0
Total			0	0	0	0

=== Tennis ===
Bohemia's Olympic debut in 1900 included one tennis player, Hedwiga Rosenbaumová, who took one of the bronze medals in the women's singles. It was Bohemia's only tennis medal, though the nation competed in tennis in each of its three appearances.

Games	Athletes	Events	Gold	Silver	Bronze	Total
1900 Paris	1	1/4	0	0	1	1
Total			0	0	1	39

== See also ==
- List of flag bearers for Bohemia at the Olympics
- Category:Olympic competitors for Bohemia
