= Pšenička =

Pšenička is a surname. Notable people with the surname include:

- Arnošt Pšenička (1916–1977), Czechoslovak politician
- Josef Pšenička (1889–1922), Czechoslovak politician
- Miroslav Pšenička (born 1974), Czech organist
- Rudolf Jaromír Pšenka (né Pšenička; 1875–1939), Czech-American writer and activist
- Thomas Sean Pšenička; born 2004), Irish-born Czech actor and musician
- Tomáš Pšenička (born 1998), Czech ice hockey player
- Václav Pšenička (1906–1961), Czech Olympic weightlifter, father of Václav Pšenička Jr.
- Václav Pšenička Jr. (1931–2015), Czech Olympic weightlifter, son of Václav Pšenička
- Zdeněk Pšenička (born 1926), Czechoslovak politician
