= Czechoslovakia at the 1932 Summer Olympics =

- IOC code: TCH
- NOC: Czechoslovak Olympic Committee

in Los Angeles
- Competitors: 7
- Medals Ranked 17th: Gold 1 Silver 2 Bronze 1 Total 4

Summer Olympics appearances (overview)
- 1920; 1924; 1928; 1932; 1936; 1948; 1952; 1956; 1960; 1964; 1968; 1972; 1976; 1980; 1984; 1988; 1992

Other related appearances
- Bohemia (1900–1912); Czech Republic (1994–pres.); Slovakia (1994–pres.)

Czechoslovakia competed at the 1932 Summer Olympics in Los Angeles, United States. Because of the ongoing Great Depression and high costs for the trip to Los Angeles, the Czechoslovak state refused to sponsor the trip, but the seven best athletes still participated in events with the help of street fundraising. Those seven athletes were very successful, with the majority gaining medals, including weightlifter Jaroslav Skobla, who won gold.

== Medalists ==
Medal	Name	Sport	Event
Gold	Jaroslav Skobla	Weightlifting	Men's heavyweight
Silver	Václav Pšenička	Weightlifting	Men's heavyweight
Silver	Josef Urban	Wrestling	Men's Greco-Roman heavyweight
Bronze	František Douda	Athletics	Men's shot put
