= Tennis at the 1900 Summer Olympics =

- Date: 6–11 July 1900
- Edition: 2nd
- Surface: Red clay
- Location: Île de Puteaux
- Venue: Cercle des Sports

Champions

Men's singles
- Laurence Doherty (GBR)

Women's singles
- Charlotte Cooper (GBR)

Men's doubles
- Laurence Doherty / Reginald Doherty (GBR)

Mixed doubles
- Charlotte Cooper / Reginald Doherty (GBR)
- Summer Olympics

Four tennis events were contested at the 1900 Summer Olympics in Paris, France. These were played at the Cercle des Sports de l'Île de Puteaux. All four events were won by British players. 26 tennis players from 4 nations competed, with over half from the host nation of France.

The field was small but of high quality, particularly with the top British players present. The Doherty brothers, Reginald and Laurence, were the premier players; they won the men's doubles together, Laurence won the men's singles (after Reginald withdrew rather than play his brother in the semifinals), and Reginald partnered with Charlotte Cooper to take gold in the mixed doubles.

The tournament organization was uncertain, with no venue guaranteed until 5 days before the events began. The ten-court l'Île de Puteaux club eventually agreed to host the tournaments. Five of the courts were used, with court #5 the primary one.

== Medal summary ==
=== Events ===
| Event | Gold | Silver | Bronze |
|---|---|---|---|
| Men's singles | Laurence Doherty (GBR) | Harold Mahony (GBR) | Reginald Doherty (GBR) |
| Men's singles | Laurence Doherty (GBR) | Harold Mahony (GBR) | Arthur Norris (GBR) |
| Men's doubles | Great Britain; Laurence Doherty; Reginald Doherty | Mixed team Max Decugis (FRA); Basil Spalding de Garmendia (USA) | France; Guy de la Chapelle; André Prévost |
| Men's doubles | Great Britain; Laurence Doherty; Reginald Doherty | Mixed team Max Decugis (FRA); Basil Spalding de Garmendia (USA) | Great Britain; Harold Mahony; Arthur Norris |
| Women's singles | Charlotte Cooper (GBR) | Hélène Prévost (FRA) | Marion Jones Farquhar (USA) |
| Women's singles | Charlotte Cooper (GBR) | Hélène Prévost (FRA) | Hedwiga Rosenbaumová (BOH) |
| Mixed doubles | Great Britain; Charlotte Cooper; Reginald Doherty | Mixed team Hélène Prévost (FRA); Harold Mahony (GBR) | Mixed team Marion Jones Farquhar (USA); Laurence Doherty (GBR) |
| Mixed doubles | Great Britain; Charlotte Cooper; Reginald Doherty | Mixed team Hélène Prévost (FRA); Harold Mahony (GBR) | Mixed team Hedwiga Rosenbaumová (BOH); Archibald Warden (GBR) |

=== Medal table ===
| Rank | Nation | Gold | Silver | Bronze | Total |
|---|---|---|---|---|---|
| 1 | Great Britain | 4 | 1 | 3 | 8 |
| 2 | Mixed team | 0 | 2 | 2 | 4 |
| 3 | France | 0 | 1 | 1 | 2 |
| 4 | Bohemia | 0 | 0 | 1 | 1 |
| 4 | United States | 0 | 0 | 1 | 1 |
| Totals (5 entries) | | 4 | 4 | 8 | 16 |

== Participating nations ==
A total of 26 players from 4 nations competed at the Paris Games:

- Bohemia (1)
- France (14)
- Great Britain (6)
- United States (5)

== Non-Olympic events ==
In addition to the four events recognized as Olympic competitions, there were other tennis events conducted at the l'Île de Puteaux club during the week of the Olympic events. These included handicap events and a professional round-robin men's singles tournament.
