= Weightlifting at the 1932 Summer Olympics – Men's +82.5 kg =

Weightlifting at the Olympics

The men's heavyweight event was part of the weightlifting programme at the 1932 Summer Olympics in Los Angeles. The weight class was the heaviest contested, and allowed weightlifters over 82.5 kilograms (181.5 pounds). The competition was held on Sunday, 31 July 1932. Six weightlifters from four nations competed.

== Medalists ==
Gold	Silver	Bronze
Jaroslav Skobla; Czechoslovakia	Václav Pšenička; Czechoslovakia	Josef Straßberger; Germany

== Records ==
These were the standing world and Olympic records (in kilograms) prior to the 1932 Summer Olympics.

World Record	Press	133	(Austria) Rudolf Schilberg	Vienna (AUT)	1931
World Record	Snatch	>126	?		
World Record	Clean & Jerk	167	(Egypt) El Sayed Nosseir	Luxembourg City (LUX)	1931
World Record	Total	400	(Egypt) El Sayed Nosseir	Cairo (EGY)	1931
Olympic Record	Press	122.5	(Germany) Josef Straßberger	Amsterdam (NED)	29 July 1928
Olympic Record	Snatch	110	(Estonia) Arnold Luhaäär	Amsterdam (NED)	29 July 1928
Olympic Record	Snatch	110	(Austria) Josef Leppelt	Amsterdam (NED)	29 July 1928
Olympic Record	Snatch	110	(Germany) Hermann Volz	Amsterdam (NED)	29 July 1928
Olympic Record	Clean & Jerk	150	(Estonia) Arnold Luhaäär	Amsterdam (NED)	29 July 1928
Olympic Record	Total	372.5	(Germany) Josef Straßberger	Amsterdam (NED)	29 July 1928

Josef Strassberger improved the standing Olympic record in press with 125 kilograms. Václav Pšenička bettered the Olympic record in snatch with 117.5 kilograms and Jaroslav Skobla set new Olympic records in clean and jerk with 152.5 kilograms and in total with 380 kilograms.

== Results ==
All figures in kilograms.

Place	Weightlifter	Press			Snatch			Clean & jerk			Total
Place	Weightlifter	1.	2.	3.	1.	2.	3.	1.	2.	3.	Total
1	Jaroslav Skobla (TCH)	107.5	112.5	X (115)	107.5	112.5	115	150	152.5	-	380
2	Václav Pšenička (TCH)	110	112.5	-	110	115	117.5	X (147.5)	147.5	X (152.5)	377.5
3	Josef Straßberger (GER)	115	120	125	102.5	107.5	110	137.5	X (142.5)	142.5	377.5
4	Marcel Dumoulin (FRA)	90	95	X (97.5)	102.5	107.5	X (110)	135	140	X (145)	342.5
5	Albert Manger (USA)	90	95	100	87.5	92.5	X (97.5)	117.5	122.5	X (127.5)	315
6	Howard Turbyfill (USA)	77.5	X (82.5)	X (82.5)	95	X (100)	X (100)	127.5	132.5	X (137.5)	305
