= Marcel Dumoulin =

French weightlifter

Marcel Dumoulin (17 January 1905 – 30 June 1981) was a French weightlifter. He competed in the 1928 Summer Olympics, in the 1932 Summer Olympics, and in the 1936 Summer Olympics.

== Career ==
Dumoulin was born in Strasbourg. In 1928 he finished tenth in the heavyweight class. Four years later he finished fourth in the heavyweight class at the 1932 Games. At the 1936 Olympics, he finished again tenth in the heavyweight class.
