= Dave Mayor =

American weightlifter (1916–2002)

Personal information
- Born: August 21, 1916 Philadelphia, Pennsylvania, United States
- Died: May 27, 2002 (aged 85) Philadelphia, Pennsylvania, United States

Sport
- Sport: Weightlifting

Dave Mayor (August 21, 1916 – May 27, 2002) was an American weightlifter. He competed in the men's heavyweight event at the 1936 Summer Olympics.

== Early life ==
Mayor is a native of Philadelphia and graduated from Philadelphia’s Overbrook High School in 1933.

== Competition career ==
Mayor finished in second place in the 1936 U.S. senior nationals and earned a spot on the 1936 United States Olympic weightlifting team. He would go on to compete at the 1936 Summer Olympics in Berlin, placing in 12th place. After the Olympics, he would win the U.S. heavyweight weightlifting championship in 1937. He spent several years as a professional wrestler.

== Post-competition career ==
Mayor worked as a regional manager at York Barbell. One of the first strength coaches in pro sports, Mayor also worked as a strength coach with the Dallas Cowboys of the NFL in the 1960s.. In the 1964 Summer Olympics, he was a strength training consultant for the Vesper Boat Club eight that won Olympic gold for the United States in the men's eight rowing event.

== Halls of fame ==
In 2007, Mayor was inducted into the Philadelphia Jewish Sports Hall of Fame.

== Death ==
Mayor died on May 27, 2002 at the age of 85.
