= Howard Turbyfill =

American weightlifter (1913–1984)

- Born: March 25, 1913; Palestine, Texas, U.S.
- Died: August 3, 1984 (aged 71); Bakersville, North Carolina, U.S.
- Occupation: Weightlifter

Howard Turbyfill (March 25, 1913 - August 3, 1984) was an American weightlifter who competed in the 1932 Summer Olympics. In 1932 he finished sixth in the heavyweight class.
