= Marguerite Fourrier =

French tennis player

- Full name: Marguerite Fourrier

Marguerite Fourrier was a French tennis player. She competed in the women's singles event at the 1900 Summer Olympics.
