= Weightlifting at the 1936 Summer Olympics – Men's +82.5 kg =

Men's +82.5 kg at the Games of the XI Olympiad
- Venue: Deutschlandhalle
- Date: 5 August 1936
- Competitors: 13 from 9 nations
- Winning total: 410.0 kg

Medalists
1st place, gold medalist(s)		Josef Manger	Germany
2nd place, silver medalist(s)		Václav Pšenička	Czechoslovakia
3rd place, bronze medalist(s)		Arnold Luhaäär	Estonia

The men's heavyweight event was part of the weightlifting programme at the 1936 Summer Olympics in Berlin. It was the heaviest weight class contested, open to weightlifters over 82.5 kilograms. The competition was held on Wednesday, 5 August 1936.

== Results ==
All figures in kilograms.

Rank	Weightlifter	Nation	Press				Snatch				Clean & jerk				Total
Rank	Weightlifter	Nation	1	2	3	Result	1	2	3	Result	1	2	3	Result	Total
1st place, gold medalist(s)	Josef Manger	Germany	122.5	132.5	~~135.0~~	132.5 OR	115.0	122.5	~~125.0~~	122.5	145.0	152.5	155.0	155.0 OR	410.0 OR
2nd place, silver medalist(s)	Václav Pšenička	Czechoslovakia	122.5	~~127.5~~	~~127.5~~	122.5	117.5	122.5	125.0	125.0	150.0	~~155.0~~	155.0	155.0 OR	402.5
3rd place, bronze medalist(s)	Arnold Luhaäär	Estonia	107.5	112.5	115.0	115.0	112.5	~~120.0~~	120.0	120.0	152.5	160.0	165.0	165.0 OR	400.0
4	Ronald Walker	Great Britain	110.0	~~120.0~~	~~120.0~~	110.0	115.0	122.5	127.5	127.5 OR	150.0	160.0	~~167.5~~	160.0	397.5
5	Hussein Moukhtar	Egypt	105.0	110.0	112.5	112.5	115.0	122.5	~~125.0~~	122.5	150.0	160.0	~~165.0~~	160.0	395.0
6	Josef Zemann	Austria	105.0	110.0	~~112.5~~	110.0	115.0	122.5	~~125.0~~	122.5	150.0	155.0	~~157.5~~	155.0	387.5
7	Paul Wahl	Germany	110.0	115.0	~~117.5~~	115.0	110.0	~~120.0~~	~~120.0~~	110.0	140.0	~~150.0~~	150.0	150.0	375.0
8	Rudolf Schilberg	Austria	115.0	125.0	~~130.0~~	125.0	~~102.5~~	~~107.5~~	107.5	107.5	~~135.0~~	135.0	140.0	140.0	372.5
9	John Grimek	United States	115.0	~~120.0~~	~~120.0~~	115.0	~~105.0~~	105.0	~~110.0~~	105.0	137.5	~~145.0~~	~~145.0~~	137.5	357.5
10	Marcel Dumoulin	France	95.0	100.0	~~102.5~~	100.0	~~110.0~~	110.0	~~115.0~~	110.0	135.0	140.0	145.0	145.0	355.0
11	Václav Bečvář	Czechoslovakia	95.0	~~100.0~~	~~100.0~~	95.0	110.0	~~115.0~~	~~117.5~~	110.0	145.0	150.0	–	150.0	355.0
12	Dave Mayor	United States	95.0	~~100.0~~	100.0	100.0	102.5	~~107.5~~	107.5	107.5	137.5	~~145.0~~	145.0	145.0	352.5
13	Ernst Fischer	Switzerland	~~102.5~~	102.5	~~105.0~~	102.5	90.0	~~95.0~~	~~95.0~~	90.0	125.0	~~130.0~~	~~130.0~~	125.0	317.5

== Sources ==
- Olympic Report
