= Tennis at the 1900 Summer Olympics – Mixed doubles =

Tennis at the Olympics

Mixed doubles tennis at the Games of the II Olympiad
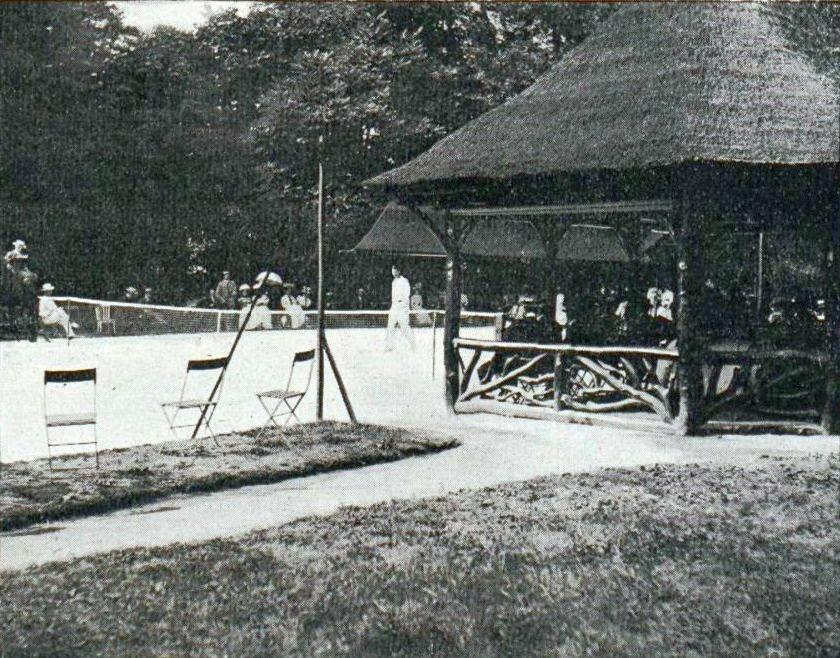
- Tennis at the 1900 Olympics
- Venue: Île de Puteaux
- Dates: 6–11 July 1900
- Competitors: 12 from 4 nations
- Teams: 6

Medalists
1st place, gold medalist(s)		Great Britain: Charlotte Cooper; Reginald Doherty
2nd place, silver medalist(s)		Mixed team: Hélène Prévost; Harold Mahony
3rd place, bronze medalist(s)		Mixed team: Archibald Warden; Hedwiga Rosenbaumová
3rd place, bronze medalist(s)		Mixed team: Laurence Doherty; Marion Jones Farquhar

Mixed doubles
- Tennis at the 1900 Summer Olympics

Events
Singles	men	women
Doubles	men		mixed
- Summer Olympics

The mixed doubles was an event on the Tennis at the 1900 Summer Olympics program in Paris. It was held from 6 to 11 July at the Île de Puteaux. There were 12 competitors (6 teams) from 4 nations, with 3 of the teams being mixed teams. The event was won by British pair Charlotte Cooper and Reginald Doherty. The other three medals were taken by the three mixed teams: Hélène Prévost of France and Harold Mahony of Great Britain earned silver, while the bronze medals went to the Bohemian/British combination of Hedwiga Rosenbaumová and Archibald Warden and the American/British pair of Marion Jones and Laurence Doherty. All 5 of the British players thus ended up receiving a medal.

== Background ==
This was the debut appearance of mixed doubles tennis. The event would not be held again until 1912 (when both outdoor and indoor versions were held); it would then be held the next two Games in 1920 and 1924. Tennis was not a medal sport from 1928 to 1984, though there were demonstration events in 1968 (which included mixed doubles) and 1984 (which did not). Mixed doubles did not return with the rest of the tennis programme in 1988; instead, it was not until 2012 that mixed doubles returned to the programme, where it has been since.

Great Britain's Charlotte Cooper and Reginald Doherty were by far the strongest pair; Cooper won the women's singles while Doherty earned bronze in the men's after refusing to play his brother Laurence in the semifinals. Laurence and American Marion Jones Farquhar were expected to be a formidable pair as well.

== Competition format ==
The competition was a single-elimination tournament with no bronze-medal match (both semifinal losers tied for third). All matches were best-of-three sets. Mixed-nationality teams were allowed.

== Schedule ==
Date	Time	Round
Friday, 6 July 1900; Saturday, 7 July 1900; Sunday, 8 July 1900; Monday, 9 July 1900; Tuesday, 10 July 1900; Wednesday, 11 July 1900		Quarterfinals; Semifinals; Final

== Draw ==
Key

- Q = Qualifier
- WC = Wild card
- LL = Lucky loser
- Alt = Alternate
- ITF = ITF entry
- PR = Protected ranking
- SR = Special ranking
- SE = Special exempt
- JE = Junior exempt
- JR = Junior Accelerator Programme entrant
- CO = College Accelerator Programme entrant
- NG = Next Gen Accelerator Program entrant
- w/o = Walkover
- r = Retired
- d = Defaulted

=== Draw ===
Quarterfinals				Semifinals			Final (gold-medal match)
				Hélène Prévost (FRA); Harold Mahony (GBR)	6	6
Hedwiga Rosenbaumová (BOH); Archibald Warden (GBR)	6	3	6	Hedwiga Rosenbaumová (BOH); Archibald Warden (GBR)	3	0
Antoinette Gillou (FRA); Pierre Verdé-Delisle (FRA)	3	6	2				Hélène Prévost (FRA); Harold Mahony (GBR)	2	4
Marion Jones (USA); Laurence Doherty (GBR)	6	7					Charlotte Cooper (GBR); Reginald Doherty (GBR)	6	6
Georgina Jones (USA); Charles Sands (USA)	1	5		Marion Jones (USA); Laurence Doherty (GBR)	2	4
				Charlotte Cooper (GBR); Reginald Doherty (GBR)	6	6

== Results summary ==
Rank	Players	Nation	Quarterfinals	Semifinals	Final
1st place, gold medalist(s)	Charlotte Cooper; Reginald Doherty	Great Britain	Bye	M Jones Farquhar (USA); L Doherty (GBR); W 6–2, 6–4	H Prévost (FRA); H Mahony (GBR); W 6–2, 6–4
2nd place, silver medalist(s)	Hélène Prévost; Harold Mahony	Mixed team	Bye	H Rosenbaumová (BOH); A Warden (GBR); W 6–3, 6–0	C Cooper (GBR); R Doherty (GBR); L 6–2, 6–4
3rd place, bronze medalist(s)	Marion Jones Farquhar; Laurence Doherty	Mixed team	G Jones (USA); C Sands (USA); W 6–1, 7–5	C Cooper (GBR); R Doherty (GBR); L 6–2, 6–4	Did not advance
3rd place, bronze medalist(s)	Hedwiga Rosenbaumová; Archibald Warden	Mixed team	A Gillou (FRA); P Verdé-Delisle (FRA); W 6–3, 3–6, 6–2	H Prévost (FRA); H Mahony (GBR); L 6–3, 6–0	Did not advance
5	Georgina Jones; Charles Sands	United States	M Jones Farquhar (USA); L Doherty (GBR); L 6–1, 7–5	Did not advance	
5	Antoinette Gillou; Pierre Verdé-Delisle	France	H Rosenbaumová (BOH); A Warden (FRA); L 6–3, 3–6, 6–2	Did not advance	
