= Ronald Walker (weightlifter) =

British weightlifter

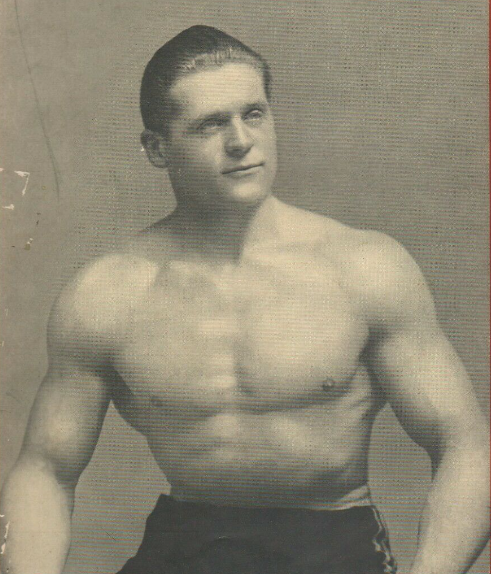

Personal information
- Nationality: British
- Born: 22 December 1907; Leeds, England
- Died: 25 October 1948 (aged 40); Leeds, England

Sport
- Sport: Weightlifting

Ronald Walker (22 December 1907 – 25 October 1948) was a British weightlifter and physical culturist. He competed in the men's heavyweight event at the 1936 Summer Olympics.

Walker established an Olympic record on the two hands snatch. He has been described the "best heavyweight lifter in England and arguably the world" in the 1930s. During his lifetime Walker held 26 British Heavyweight records. From 1938 he ran a mail order Physical Development Course in London.

Walker was a heavy smoker. He died aged 40 from cancer.
