= Ernst Fischer (weightlifter) =

Swiss weightlifter

Personal information
- Nationality: Swiss
- Born: 20 May 1904

Sport
- Sport: Weightlifting

Ernst Fischer (born 20 May 1904, date of death unknown) was a Swiss weightlifter. He competed in the men's heavyweight event at the 1936 Summer Olympics.
