= List of Olympic venues in tennis =

For the Summer Olympics, there are 15 venues that have been used for tennis. This counts separately the two different venues of the All England Lawn Tennis and Croquet Club at Wimbledon: The original Worple Road venue (now used by Wimbledon High School) was used for the 1908 Summer Olympics; the current Church Road venue, opened in 1922, was used for the 2012 Summer Olympics. (Each venue was also used that year for the Wimbledon Championships.)

Games	Venue	Surface	Capacity	Ref.
1896 Athens	Athens Lawn Tennis Club, Neo Phaliron Velodrome	Clay	Not listed 7,000	
1900 Paris	Cercle de Puteaux	Clay	Not listed	
1904 St. Louis	Francis Field	Clay	Not listed	
1908 London	All England Lawn Tennis and Croquet Club	Grass	Not listed	
1912 Stockholm	Östermalm Athletic Grounds	Clay	Not listed	
1920 Antwerp	Beerschot Tennis Club	Grass	Not listed	
1924 Paris	Stade de Tennis de Colombes	Clay	Not listed	
1984 Los Angeles (as a demonstration sport)	Los Angeles Tennis Center	Hard	5,800	
1988 Seoul	Olympic Tennis Center	Hard	15,000 (main court); 3,500; 900	
1992 Barcelona	Tennis de la Vall d'Hebron	Clay	8,000 (main court)	
1996 Atlanta	Stone Mountain Tennis Center	Hard	12,000 (main court); 27,500 (all courts)	
2000 Sydney	NSW Tennis Centre	Hard	10,000 (main court)	
2004 Athens	Athens Olympic Tennis Centre	Hard	8,600 (main court); 4,300; 200; 15,000 (all courts)	
2008 Beijing	Olympic Green Tennis Center	Hard	15,000 (main court); 10,000; 4,000; 2,000; 200; 32,400 (all courts)	
2012 London	All England Lawn Tennis and Croquet Club	Grass	14,979 (main court); 30,000 (all courts)	
2016 Rio de Janeiro	Olympic Tennis Centre	Hard	10,000 (main court); 5,000; 3,000; 250	
2020 Tokyo	Ariake Tennis Park (Ariake Coliseum)	Hard	10,000 (main court); 5,000; 3,000; 2,000; 250; 20,000 (all courts)	
2024 Paris	Stade Roland Garros	Clay	15,000 (main court); 10,000; 5,000; 2,000; 250; 34,000 (all courts)	
2028 Los Angeles	Dignity Health Sports Park Tennis Stadium	Hard	10,000 (main court)	
2032 Brisbane	Queensland Tennis Centre	Hard	5,500 (main court); 4,000; 2,400; 1,600	

== Gallery of venues ==
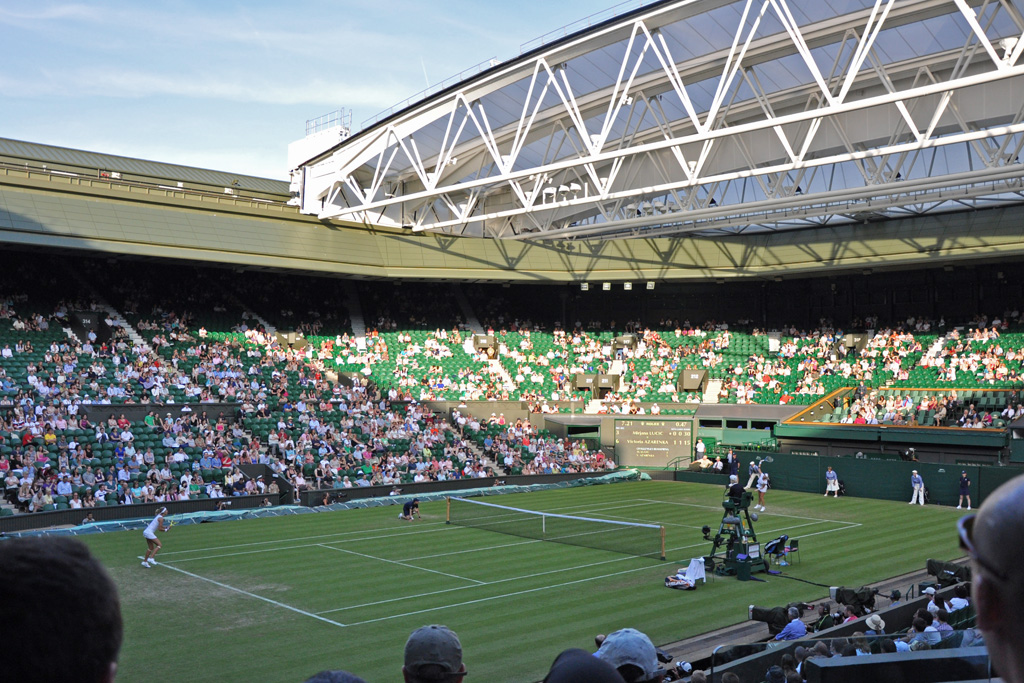
The All England Lawn Tennis and Croquet Club at Wimbledon hosted tennis at the 1908 and 2012 Summer Olympics in London.

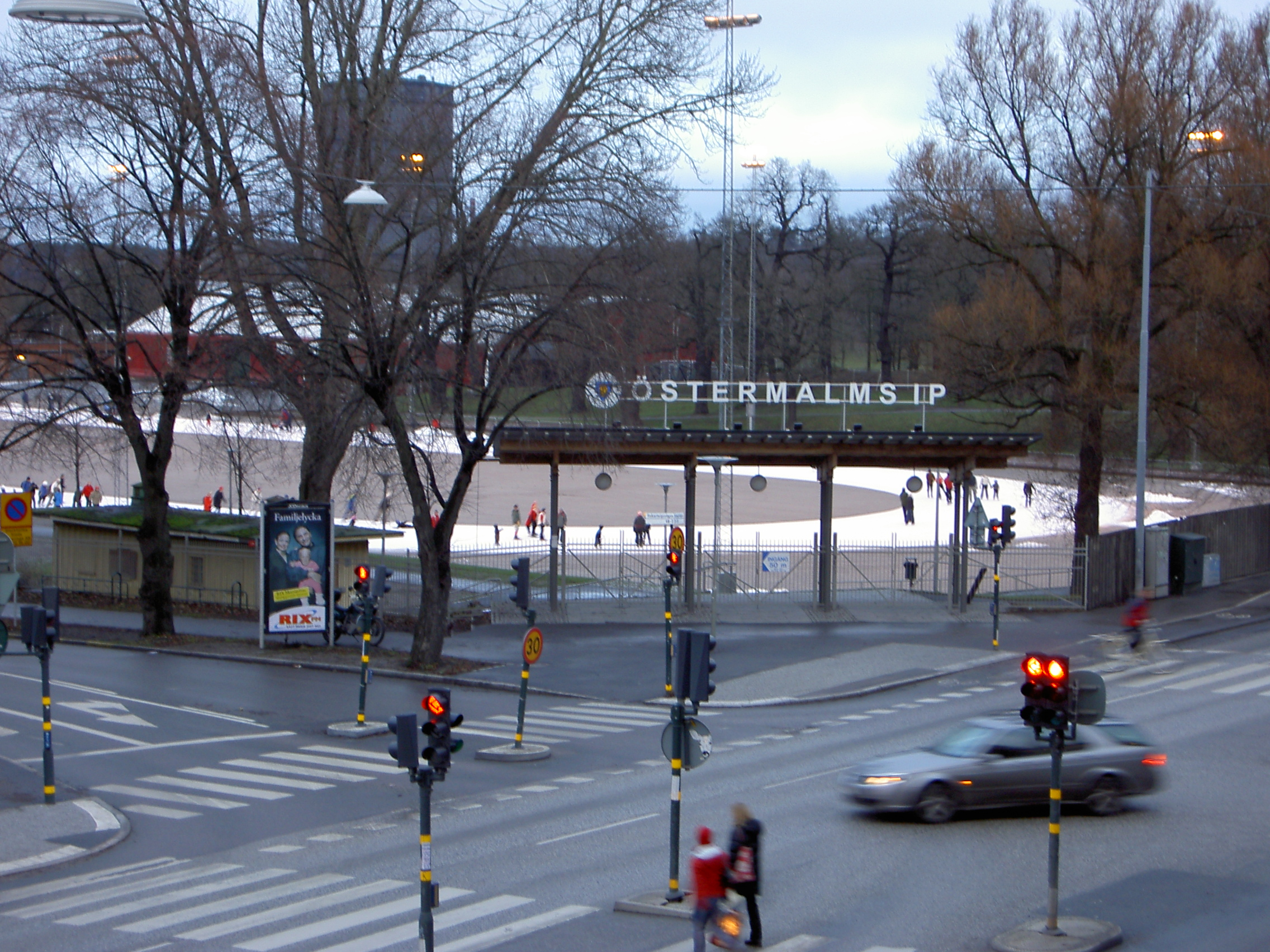
Östermalms IP hosted tennis at the 1912 Summer Olympics in Stockholm.

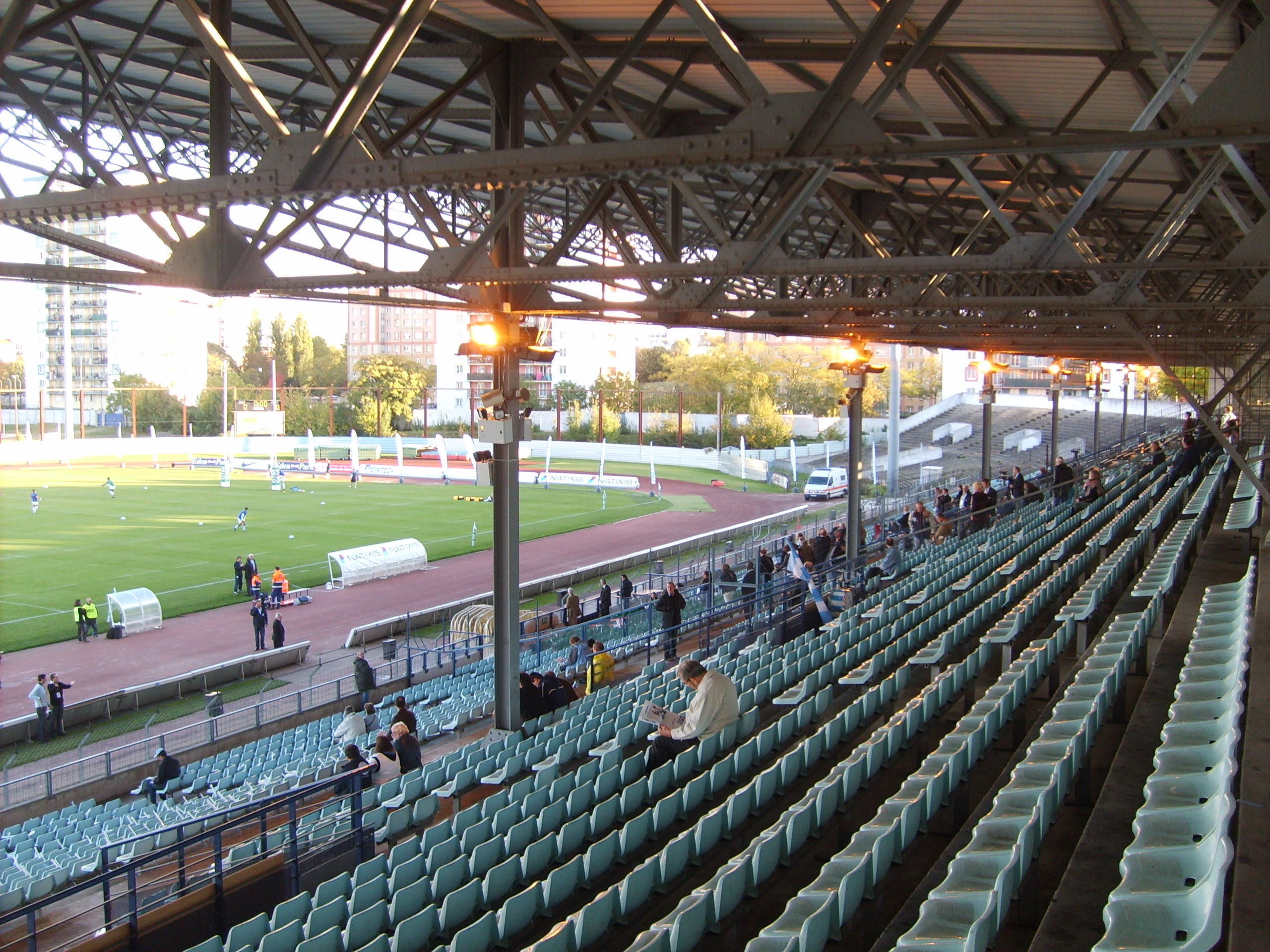
Stade Yves-du-Manoir hosted tennis at the 1924 Summer Olympics in Paris.

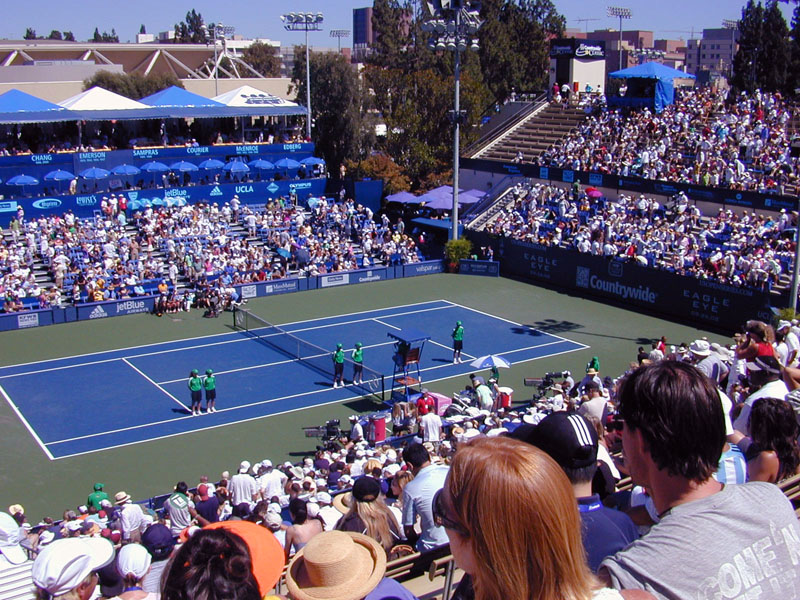
The Los Angeles Tennis Center hosted tennis as a demonstration sport at the 1984 Summer Olympics.

Seoul Olympic Park Tennis Center hosted tennis at the 1988 Summer Olympics.

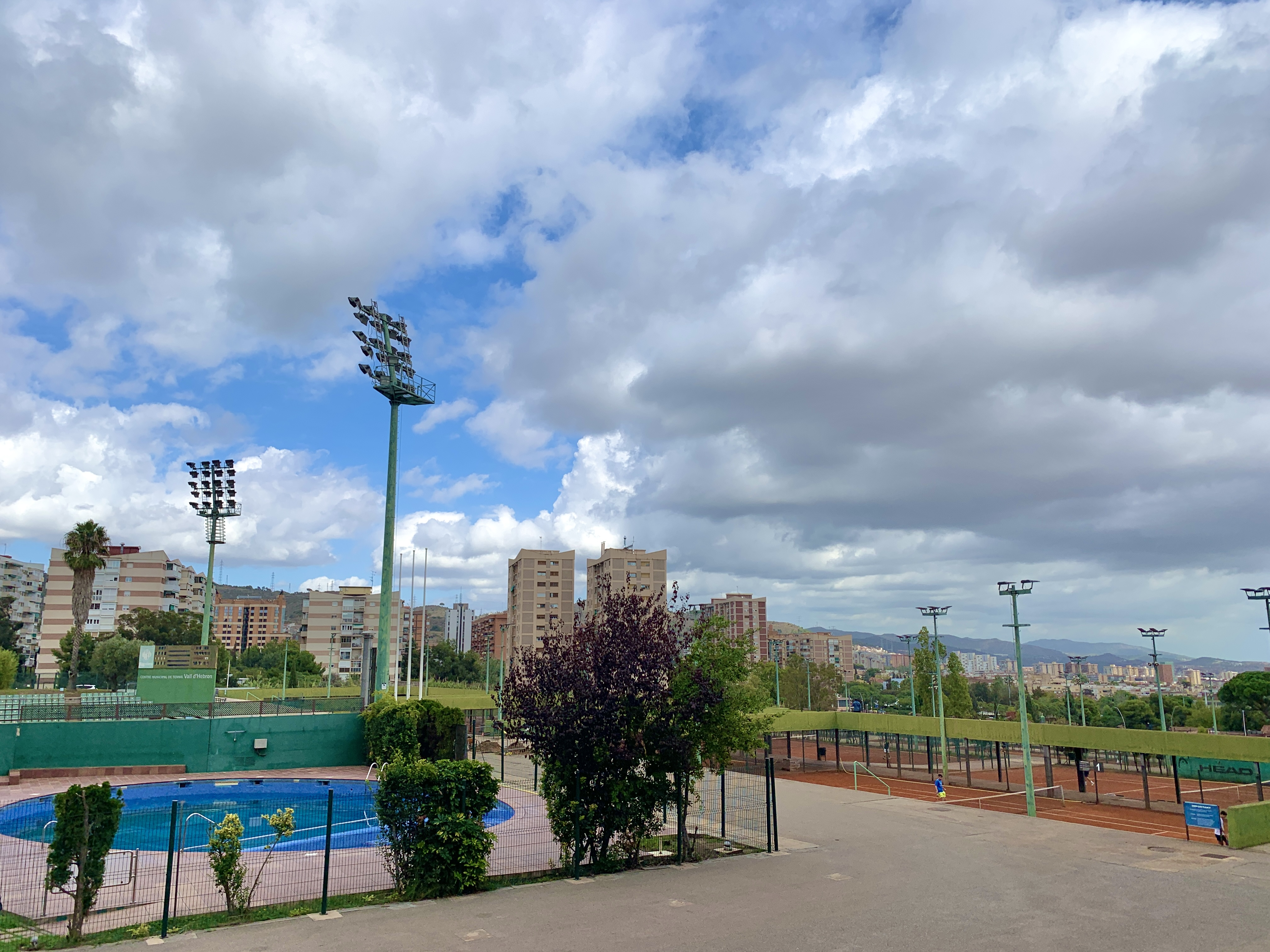
Tennis de la Vall d'Hebron hosted tennis at the 1992 Summer Olympics in Barcelona.

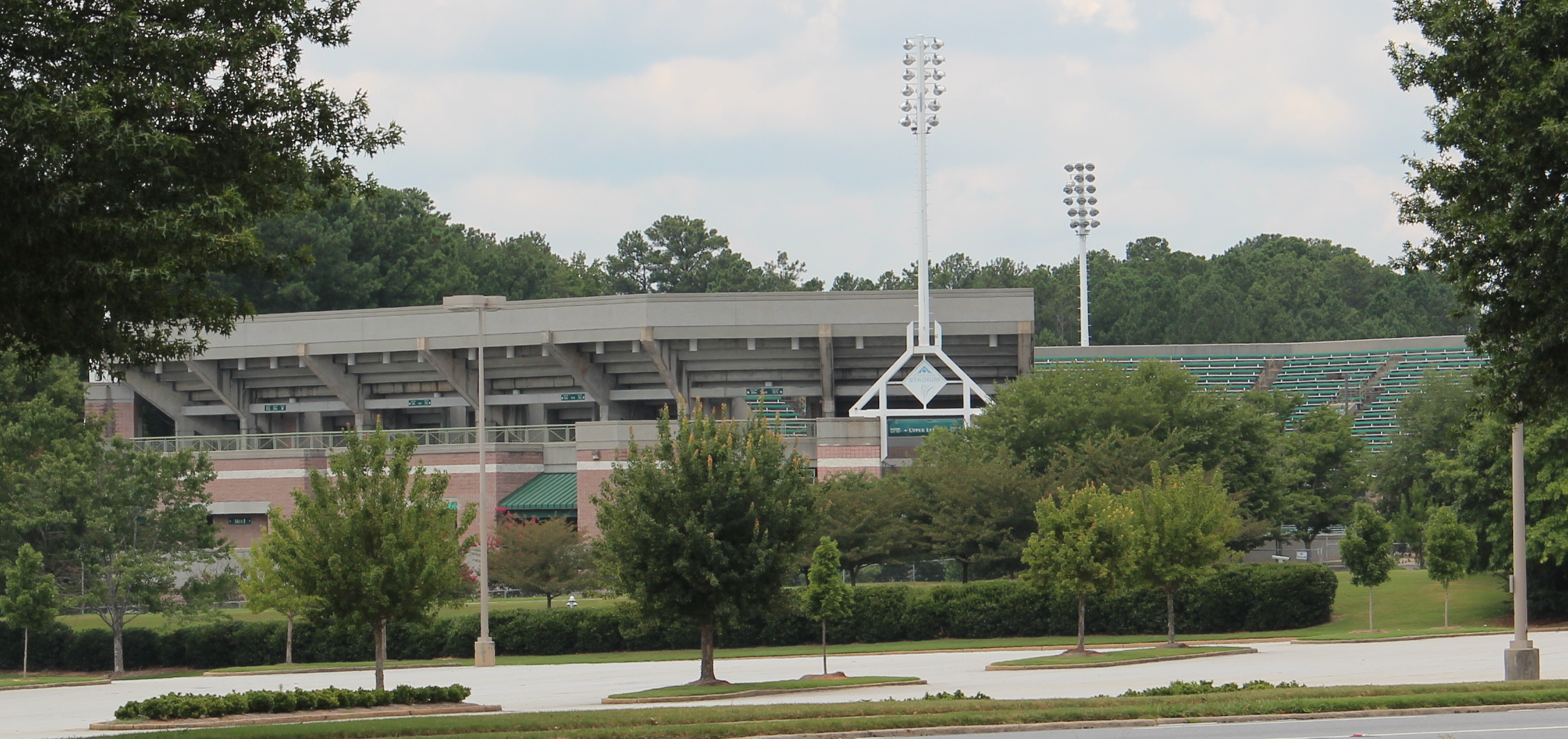
Stone Mountain Tennis Center hosted tennis at the 1996 Summer Olympics in Atlanta.

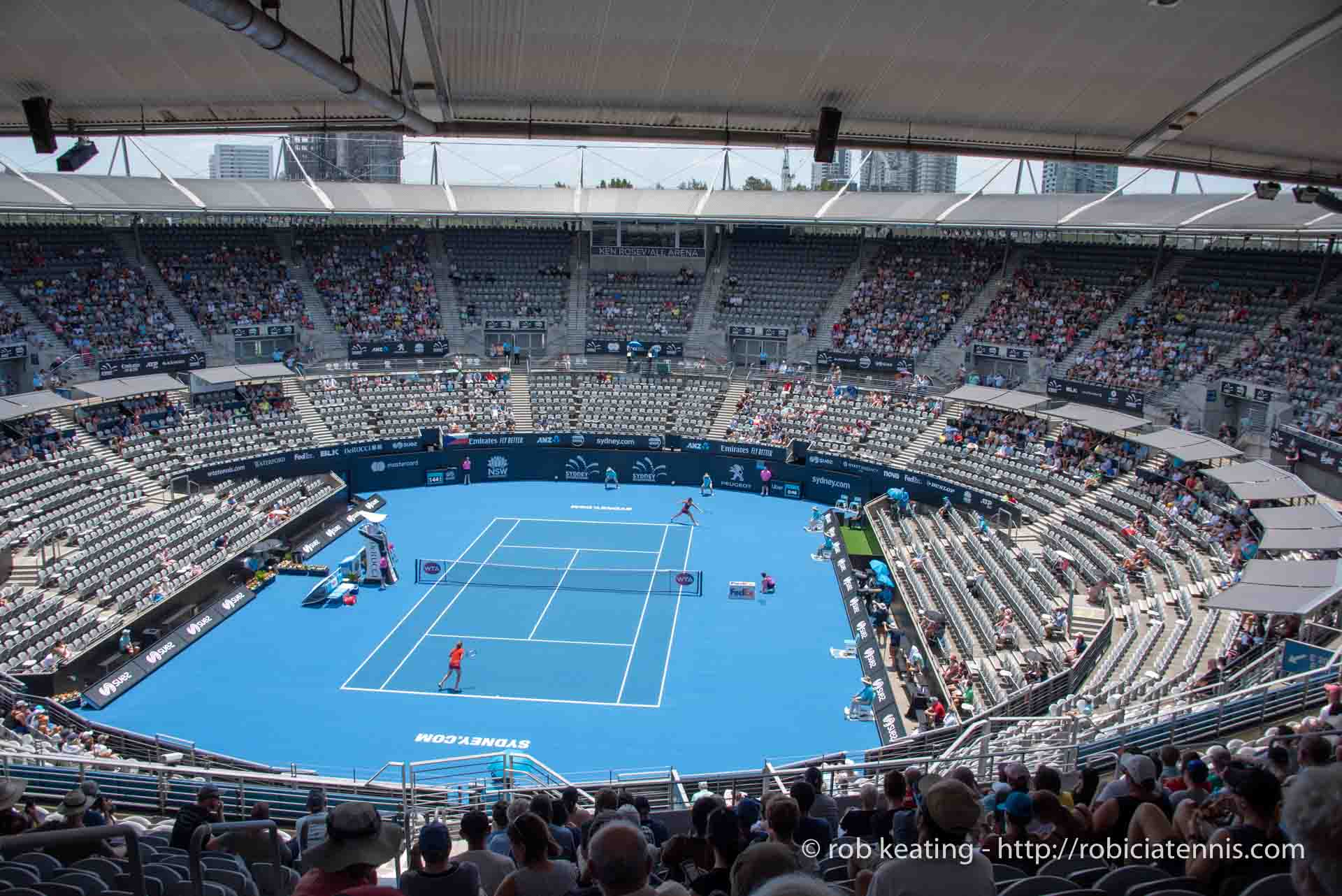
The Sydney Olympic Park Tennis Centre hosted tennis at the 2000 Summer Olympics.

The Athens Olympic Tennis Centre hosted tennis at the 2004 Summer Olympics.

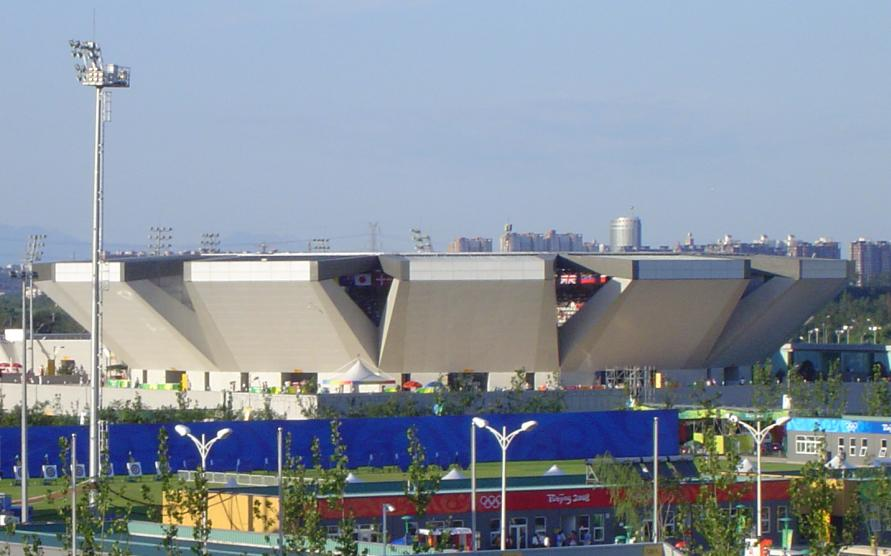
Olympic Green Tennis Center hosted tennis at the 2008 Summer Olympics in Beijing.

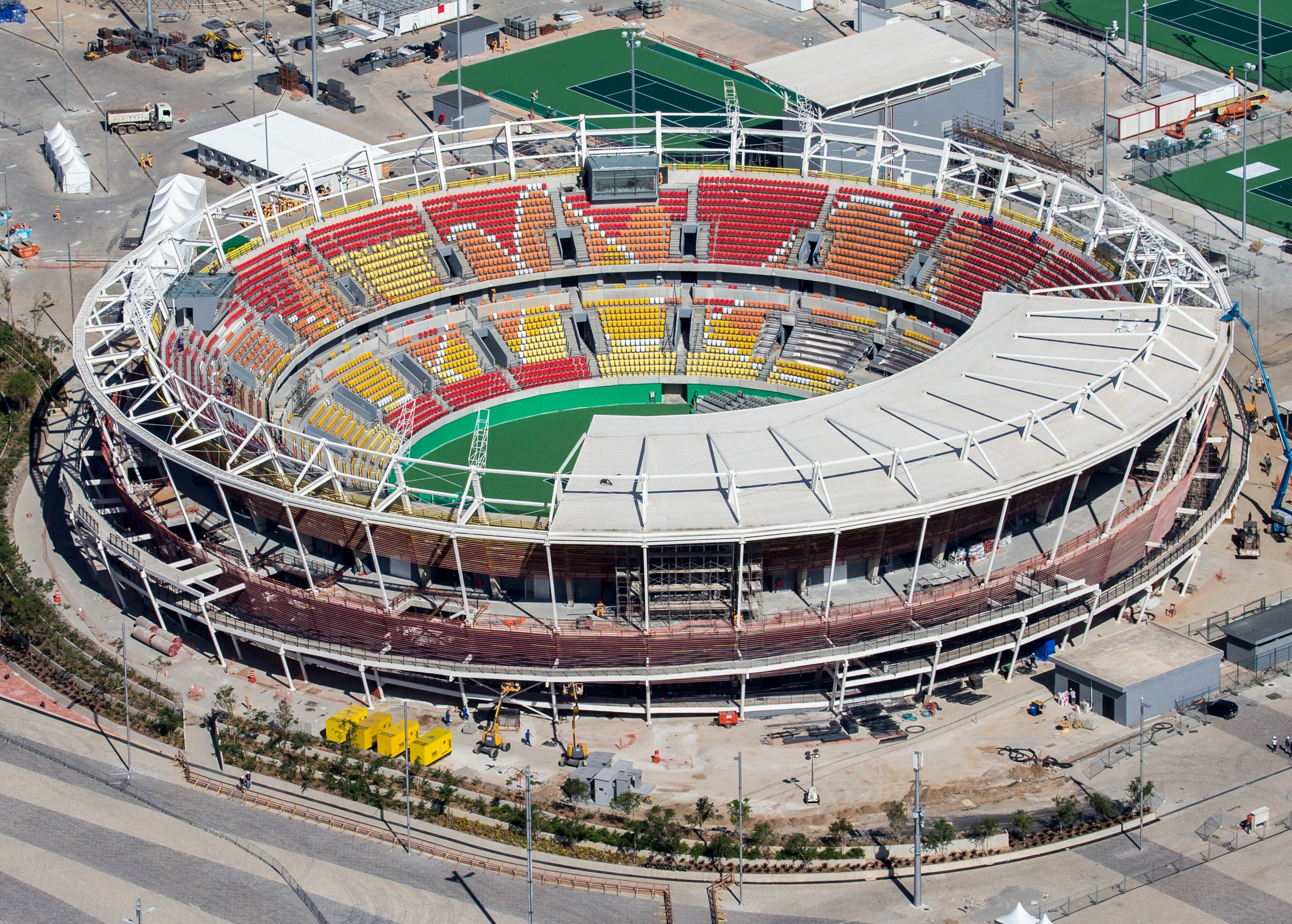
The Olympic Tennis Centre hosted tennis at the 2016 Summer Olympics in Rio de Janeiro.

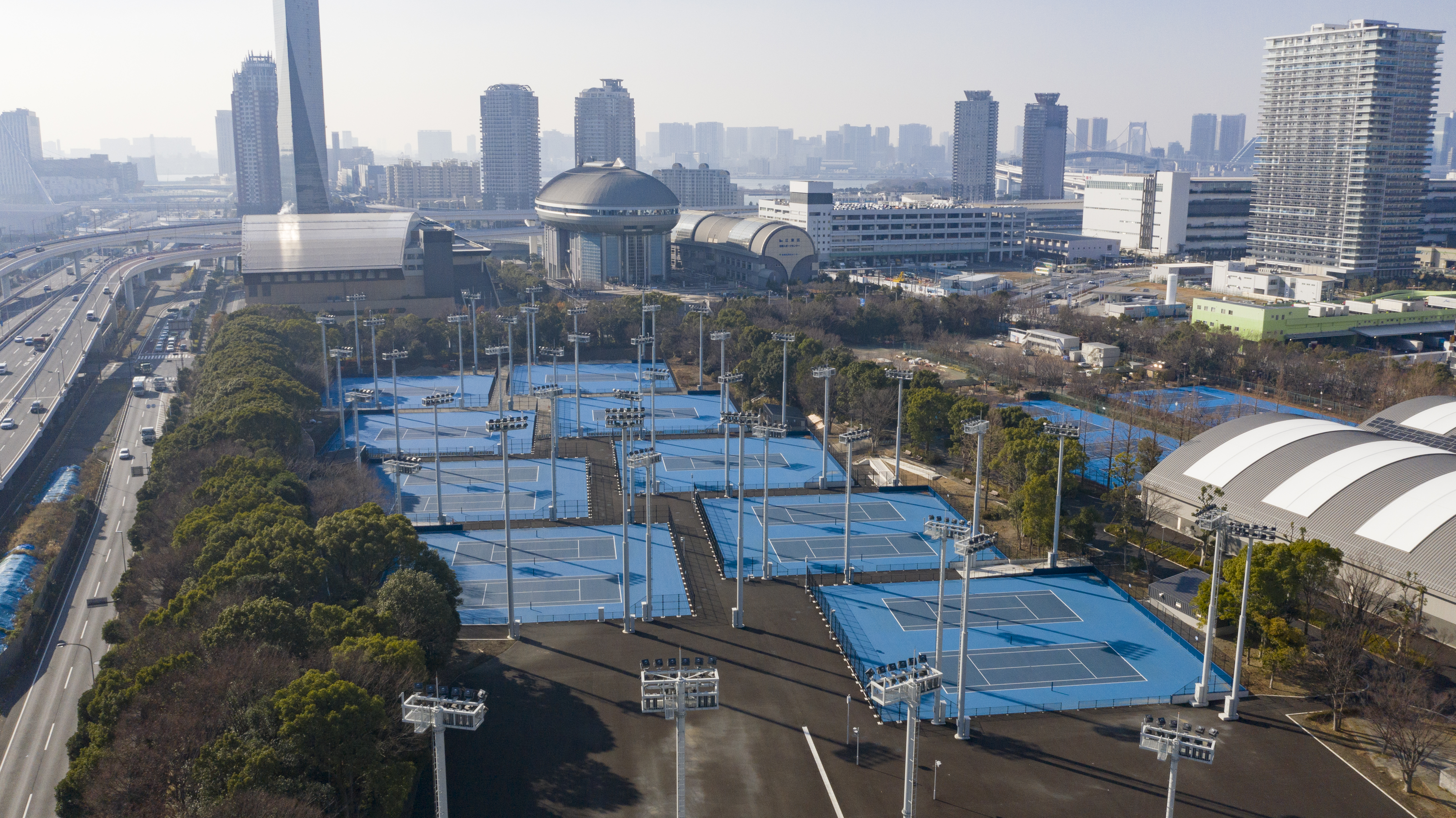
Ariake Tennis Park hosted tennis at the 2020 Summer Olympics in Tokyo.

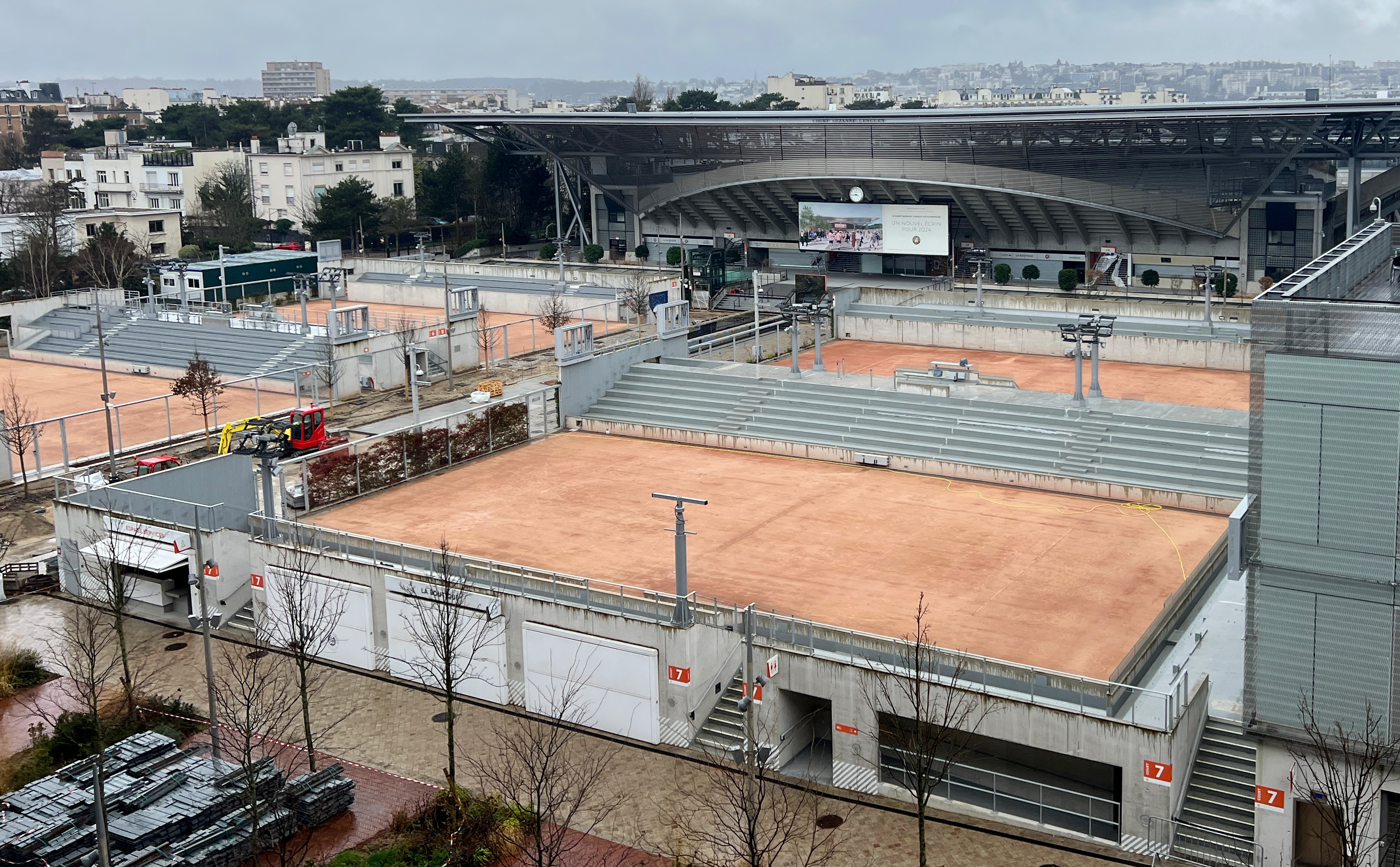
Stade Roland Garros hosted tennis at the 2024 Summer Olympics in Paris.

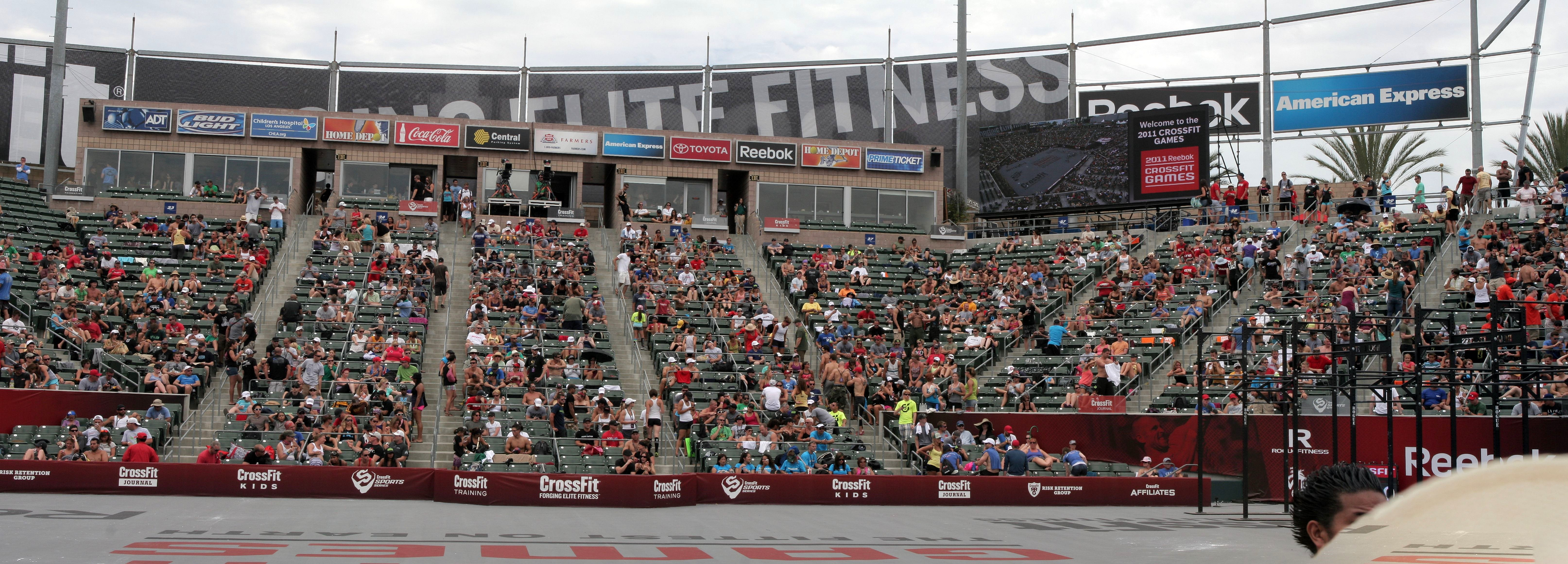
The Dignity Health Sports Park will host tennis at the 2028 Summer Olympics in Los Angeles

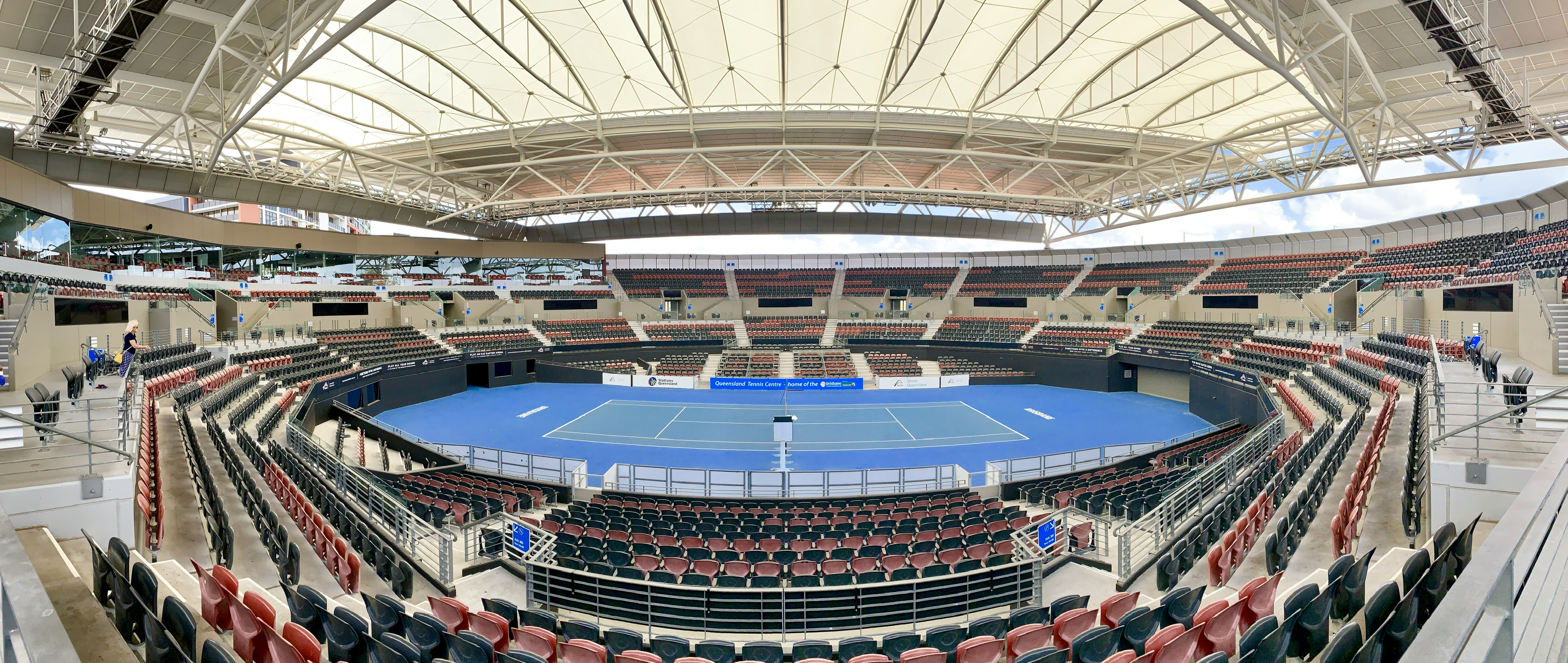
The Queensland Tennis Centre will host tennis at the 2032 Summer Olympics in Brisbane.
