= Paul Wahl =

German weightlifter (1906–1982)

Personal information
- Nationality: German
- Born: 6 October 1906; Stuttgart, Germany
- Died: 13 February 1982 (aged 75); Stuttgart, Germany

Sport
- Sport: Weightlifting

Paul Wahl (6 October 1906 – 13 February 1982) was a German weightlifter. He competed in the men's heavyweight event at the 1936 Summer Olympics.
