= Albert Manger =

American weightlifter (1899–1985)

Personal information
- Full name: Albert Henry Manger
- Nationality: American
- Born: 1899
- Died: 1985 (aged 85–86)

Sport
- Sport: Athletics
- Event: Weightlifting

Albert Henry Manger, also known as Al Manger (May 21, 1899 – March 1985), was an American weightlifter who competed in the 1932 Summer Olympics. He was the United States heavyweight weightlifting champion. In 1932 he finished fifth in the heavyweight class. Manger also performed in lifting exhibitions. He died in Baltimore, Maryland.
