= Tennis at the 1900 Summer Olympics – Women's singles =

Tennis at the Olympics

Women's singles tennis at the Games of the II Olympiad
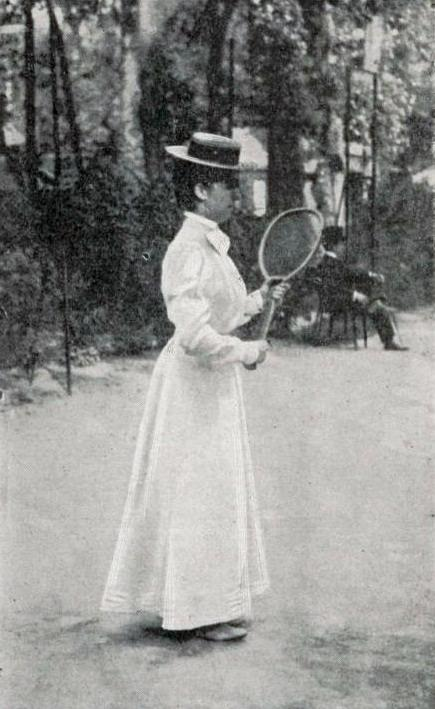
- Silver medalist Hélène Prévost
- Venue: Île de Puteaux
- Dates: 6–11 July 1900
- Competitors: 6 from 4 nations

Medalists
1st place, gold medalist(s)		Charlotte Cooper	Great Britain
2nd place, silver medalist(s)		Hélène Prévost	France
3rd place, bronze medalist(s)		Marion Jones Farquhar	United States
3rd place, bronze medalist(s)		Hedwig Rosenbaum	Bohemia

Women's singles
- Tennis at the 1900 Summer Olympics

Events
Singles	men	women
Doubles	men		mixed
- Summer Olympics

The women's singles was an event on the Tennis at the 1900 Summer Olympics program in Paris. It was held from 6 to 11 July at the Île de Puteaux. There were 6 competitors from 4 nations. The event was won by Charlotte Cooper of Great Britain. France's Hélène Prévost was the silver medalist, while American Marion Jones Farquhar and Hedwig Rosenbaum of Bohemia are credited with bronze medals. The event made Cooper the first female individual Olympic champion (Hélène de Pourtalès won a gold medal in a team event in sailing earlier; Margaret Abbott would win the women's golf tournament later, in October).

== Background ==
This was the debut appearance of the women's singles tennis. A women's event was held only once during the first three Games (only men's tennis was played in 1896 and 1904), but has been held at every Olympics for which there was a tennis tournament since 1908. Tennis was not a medal sport from 1928 to 1984, though there were demonstration events in 1968 and 1984.

The field for the women's tournament in 1900 was small but distinguished. Great Britain's Charlotte Cooper was a three-time Wimbledon champion (1895, 1896, 1898). France had its best player, Hélène Prévost. Bohemia sent its second-best, Hedwiga Rosenbaumová. Marion Jones Farquhar was the U.S. champion in 1899 (and would be again in 1902). (Her sister Georgina Jones also competed.)

== Competition format ==
The competition was a single-elimination tournament with no bronze-medal match (both semifinal losers tied for third). All matches were best-of-three sets.

== Schedule ==
Date	Time	Round
Friday, 6 July 1900; Saturday, 7 July 1900; Sunday, 8 July 1900; Monday, 9 July 1900; Tuesday, 10 July 1900; Wednesday, 11 July 1900		Quarterfinals; Semifinals; Final

== Draw ==
Key

- Q = Qualifier
- WC = Wild card
- LL = Lucky loser
- Alt = Alternate
- ITF = ITF entry
- PR = Protected ranking
- SR = Special ranking
- SE = Special exempt
- JE = Junior exempt
- JR = Junior Accelerator Programme entrant
- CO = College Accelerator Programme entrant
- NG = Next Gen Accelerator Program entrant
- w/o = Walkover
- r = Retired
- d = Defaulted

=== Draw ===
Quarterfinals			Semifinals			Final (gold-medal match)
			Marion Jones Farquhar (USA)	2	5
Charlotte Cooper (GBR)	6	6	Charlotte Cooper (GBR)	6	7
Marguerite Fourrier (FRA)	2	0				Charlotte Cooper (GBR)	6	6
Hélène Prévost (FRA)	6	6				Hélène Prévost (FRA)	1	4
Georgina Jones (USA)	0	1	Hélène Prévost (FRA)	6	6
			Hedwig Rosenbaum (BOH)	1	1

== Results summary ==
Rank	Player	Nation	Quarterfinals	Semifinals	Final
1st place, gold medalist(s)	Charlotte Cooper	Great Britain	Fourrier (FRA); W 6–2, 6–0	Jones Farquhar (USA); W 6–2, 7–5	Prévost (FRA); W 6–1, 6–4
2nd place, silver medalist(s)	Hélène Prévost	France	G Jones (USA); W 6–0, 6–1	Rosenbaum (BOH); W 6–1, 6–1	Cooper (GBR); L 6–1, 6–4
3rd place, bronze medalist(s)	Marion Jones Farquhar	United States	Bye	Cooper (GBR); L 6–2, 7–5	Did not advance
3rd place, bronze medalist(s)	Hedwig Rosenbaum	Bohemia	Bye	Prévost (FRA); L 6–1, 6–1	Did not advance
5	Marguerite Fourrier	France	Cooper (GBR); L 6–2, 6–0	Did not advance	
5	Georgina Jones	United States	Prévost (FRA); L 6–0, 6–1	Did not advance	
