= Pierre Verdé-Delisle =

French tennis player

- Full name: Philippe-Edmond Pierre Verdé-Delisle
- Born: 16 May 1877; Trie-la-Ville, France
- Died: 18 July 1960 (aged 83); Paris, France

Philippe-Edmond Pierre Verdé-Delisle (16 May 1877 – 18 July 1960) was a French tennis player. He competed in the mixed doubles event at the 1900 Summer Olympics.
