= Václav Nový =

Czech runner

Václav Nový was a Bohemian track and field athlete who competed at the 1900 Summer Olympics in Paris, France. Nový competed in the 100 metres event, but was eliminated in the first round (quarterfinals) after taking third in his heat.
