= Georgina Jones (tennis) =

American tennis player (1882–1952)

Georgina Frances Jones
- Born: September 1, 1882 New York, New York, United States
- Died: September 3, 1955 (aged 73) Los Angeles, California, United States

Other tournaments
- Olympic Games: QF (1900)

Other mixed doubles tournaments
- Olympic Games: QF (1900)

Georgina Frances Jones, later Georgina Jones Walton and also known as Sister Daya, (September 1, 1882 – September 3, 1955) was an American tennis player. She competed in two events at the 1900 Summer Olympics.

== Biography ==
Jones was the daughter of Nevada Senator John P. Jones, co-founder of the town of Santa Monica, California, and Georgina Frances Sullivan. Her sister, Marion Jones Farquhar, also competed in tennis at the 1900 Olympics. Marion was the first woman to win an Olympic medal representing the United States. Jones's other sister, Alice, married Frederick William MacMonnies.

Jones learned to play tennis at the West Side Tennis Club in New York. She later moved to Paris for voice training. She joined the Vedanta Society, which studied Hindu philosophy, became known as Sister Daya and was a close follower of Swami Paramananda. As Sister Daya she wrote the book The Guru and the Disciple: My Life with Swami Paramananda. She also wrote a play, "The Light of Asia", which was choreographed by Ruth St. Denis.
