= Václav Pšenička =

Czech weightlifter

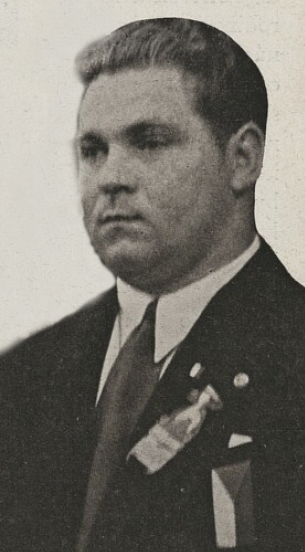
- Václav Pšenička in 1932

Personal information
- Born: 26 October 1906 Prague, Austria-Hungary
- Died: 25 April 1961 (aged 54) Prague, Czechoslovakia

Sport
- Sport: Weightlifting
Medal record
Representing Czechoslovakia
Olympic Games
Silver medal – second place	1932 Los Angeles	Heavyweight
Silver medal – second place	1936 Berlin	Heavyweight

Václav Pšenička (26 October 1906, Prague – 25 April 1961) was a Czech weightlifter who represented Czechoslovakia at the 1928 Summer Olympics, the 1932 Summer Olympics, and the 1936 Summer Olympics.

He was born and died in Prague. He was the father of Václav Pšenička, Jr..

At the 1928 Olympics, Pšenička finished fourth in the light-heavyweight class.

Four years later, he won the silver medal in the heavyweight class at the 1932 Games.

He won his second Olympic silver medal in the heavyweight class at the 1936 Olympics.
