= Hedwig Rosenbaum =

Bohemian tennis player

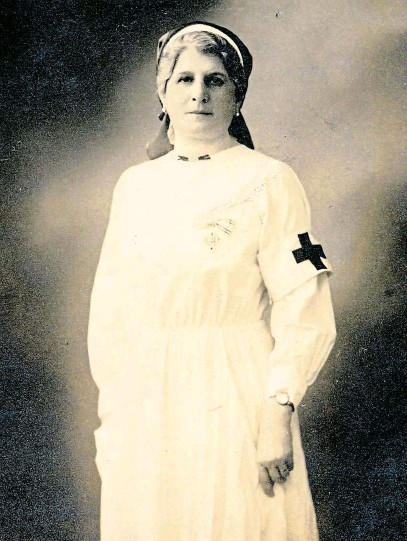

Personal information
- Born: 3 July 1864 Prague, Kingdom of Bohemia
- Died: 31 July 1939 (aged 75) Prague, Protectorate of Bohemia and Moravia

Sport
- Sport: Tennis
Medal record
Representing Bohemia
Bronze medal – third place	1900 Paris	Singles
Representing a Mixed team
Bronze medal – third place	1900 Paris	Mixed doubles

Hedwig Rosenbaum (3 July 1864 – 31 July 1939), née Hedwig Austerlitz, from 1909 on Hedwig Raabe, in Czech from 1945 on referred as Hedwiga Rosenbaumová, was a tennis player who was attributed to represent Bohemia. She won two bronze medals in tennis at the 1900 Summer Olympics in Paris, in the women's singles and the mixed doubles with Great Britain's Archibald Warden. She was the first woman to represent Bohemia at the Olympics.

Hedwig Rosenbaum was of German-Jewish origin and lived in Prague all her life. She belonged to the first generation in Prague to play tennis. At least since 1894 she played in singles, doubles and mixed tournaments in Cisleithania and Germany for the Prague Lawn Tennis Club. In 1899 Rosenbaum was number 5 on the Austrian national list. In the same year she won a tournament in Berlin.

In 1900, Rosenbaum took part in the second Summer Olympics in Paris as a private individual from Prague at her own expense for travel, accommodation and entry fees. She belonged neither to the Bohemian nor the Czech nor to the Austrian delegation. Rosenbaum was the first woman ever to represent Bohemia and Austria-Hungary at the Olympics, winning two bronze medals. In the individual tennis competition, she lost in the semifinals to eventual silver medalist Yvonne Prévost in straight sets 6–1, 6–1. In the mixed competition she played together with Briton Archibald Warden. The two were beaten in the semifinals, their second game. They lost to Prévost from France and Harold Mahony from Britain in straight sets 6–3, 6–0. The qualification of both pairs is attributed to mixed teams in Olympic history.

In 1899 she won the Championships of Berlin at the Lawn-Tennis-Turnier-Club. In 1904 she won the title at the Bohemian championships and finished second at the Austrian Championships. After that she withdrew from tournament sports due to age.

Hedwig Rosenbaum had been managing director and board member of the Club of German Female Artists in Prague (Klub deutscher Künstlerinnen in Prag) since it was founded in 1905. During World War I, Hedwig Raabe worked as a nurse. She was temporarily employed in the publishing house of her nephew Heinrich Mercy Jr. and ran a handicraft shop from 1921. She translated sports books, plays and fiction from English into German for Prague newspapers and German publishers.
