= Charlotte Cooper (tennis) =

English tennis player (1870–1966)

Charlotte Cooper Sterry
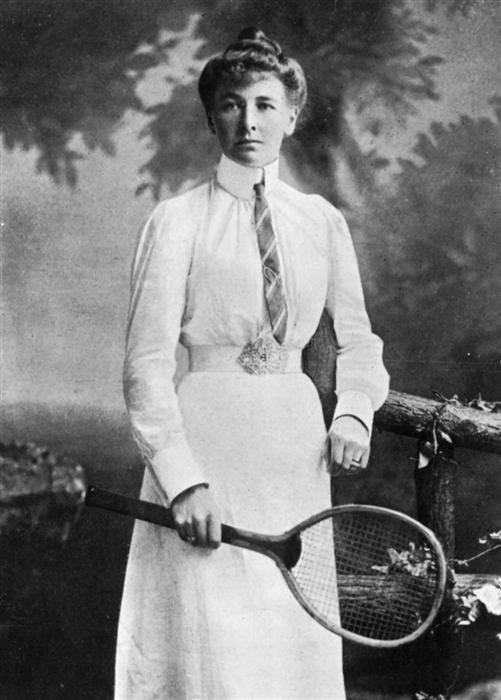
- Cooper in 1900
- Full name: Charlotte Reinagle Cooper Sterry
- Country (sports): United Kingdom
- Born: 22 September 1870 Ealing, Middlesex, England
- Died: 10 October 1966 (aged 96) Helensburgh, Scotland
- Plays: Right–handed
- Int. Tennis HoF: 2013 (member page)

Singles
- Career record: no value

Grand Slam singles results
- Wimbledon: W (1895, 1896, 1898, 1901, 1908)

Doubles
- Career record: no value

Grand Slam doubles results
- Wimbledon: F (1913)

Grand Slam mixed doubles results
- Wimbledon: 3R (1914)
Medal record
Representing Great Britain
Olympic Games
Gold medal – first place	1900 Paris	Singles
Gold medal – first place	1900 Paris	Mixed doubles

Charlotte "Chattie" Reinagle Cooper Sterry (née Cooper; 22 September 1870 – 10 October 1966) was an English female tennis player who won five singles titles at the Wimbledon Championships and in 1900 became Olympic champion. In winning in Paris on 11 July 1900, she became the first female Olympic tennis champion as well as the first individual female Olympic champion.

== Early life and career ==
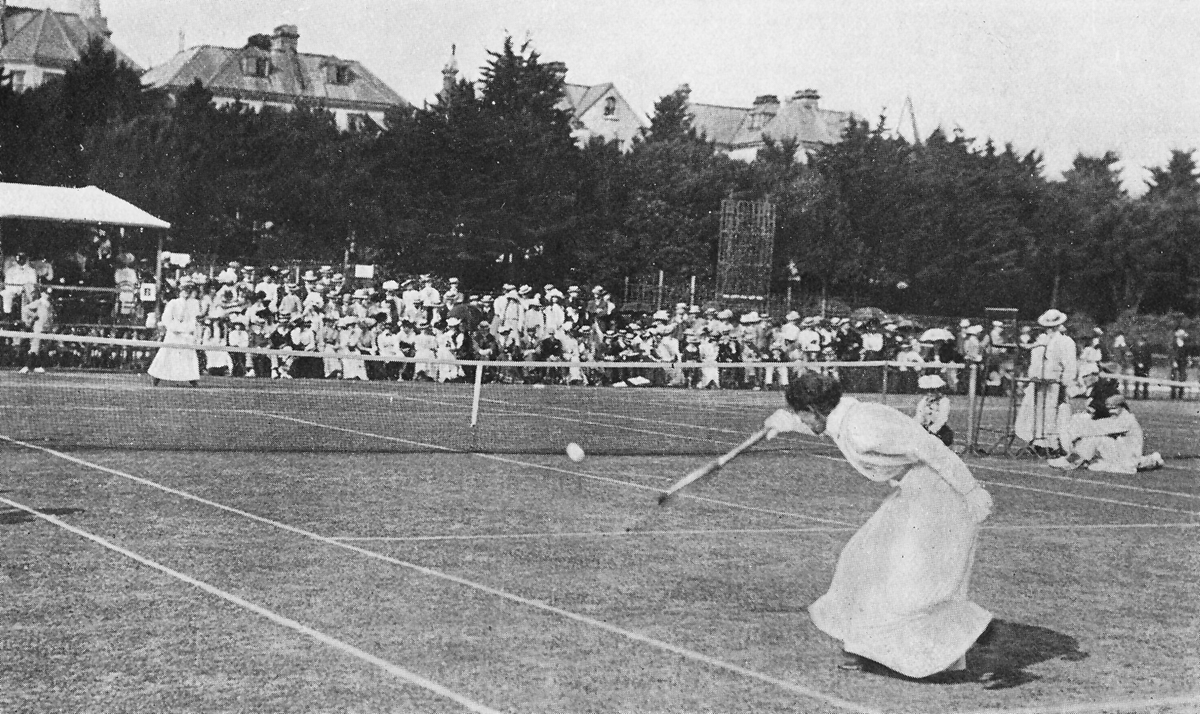
Charlotte Cooper Sterry vs Blanche Bingley Hillyard at Eastbourne

Charlotte Cooper was born on 22 September 1870 at Waldham Lodge, Ealing, Middlesex, England, the youngest daughter of Henry Cooper, a miller, and his wife Teresa Georgiana Miller. She learned to play tennis at the Ealing Lawn Tennis Club where she was first coached by H. Lawrence and later by Charles Martin and Harold Mahony. (Note: In the 1910 book by Dorothy Chambers titled "Lawn Tennis for Ladies" Cooper Sterry describes winning her first championship at the Ealing Club: "Winning my first championship of the Ealing Lawn Tennis Club at the age of 14 was a very important moment in my life. How well I remember, bedecked by my proud mother in my best clothes, running off to the Club on the Saturday afternoon to play in the final without a vestige of nerve (would that I had none now!), and winning — that was the first really important match of my life.") She won her first senior singles title in 1893 at Ilkley. Between 1893 and 1917 she participated in 21 Wimbledon tournaments. At her first appearance she reached the semifinals of the singles event in which she lost to Blanche Bingley Hillyard. She won her first singles title in 1895, defeating Helen Jackson in the final of the All-Comers event. (Note: This was actually the all-comers final as Blanche Bingley Hillyard did not defend her 1894 Wimbledon title, which resulted in the winner of the all-comers final winning the challenge round and, thus, Wimbledon in 1895 by walkover.) In that match she was down 0–5 in both sets but managed to win in straight sets. In 1896, she successfully defended her title in the Challenge Round against Alice Simpson Pickering. Between 1897 and 1901 the titles were divided between Cooper Sterry (1898, 1901) and Bingley Hillyard (1897, 1899, 1900). The 1902 Challenge Round match against Muriel Robb was halted on the first day of play due to rainfall at 6–4, 11–13. The match was replayed in its entirety the next day and Robb won 7–5, 6–1, playing a total of 53 games which was then a record for the longest women's singles final. In 1908 as a mother of two she won her last singles title when she defeated Agnes Morton in straight sets in the All-Comers final after a seven-year hiatus and at the age of 37. She is the oldest Wimbledon ladies’ singles champion and her record of eight consecutive singles finals stood until 1990 when Martina Navratilova reached her ninth consecutive singles final.

In addition to her singles titles, Cooper Sterry also won seven All-England mixed doubles titles; five times with Harold Mahony (1894–1898) and once with Laurence Doherty (1900) and Xenophon Casdagli (1908). (Note: The Mixed Doubles only became an official Championship event in 1913.) In 1913 she reached the final of the first Wimbledon women's doubles event with Dorothea Douglass, 18 years after winning her first Wimbledon title.

She won the singles title at the Irish Lawn Tennis Championships in 1895 and 1898, a prestigious tournament at the time. At the 1900 Summer Olympics, where women participated for the first time, Cooper Sterry won the tennis singles event. On 11 July 1900 she defeated Hélène Prévost in the final in straight sets and became the first female Olympic tennis champion as well as the first individual female Olympic champion. With Reginald Doherty, she won the mixed doubles title after a straight-sets victory in the final against Hélène Prévost and Harold Mahony. (Note: Medals were not awarded until the 1904 Summer Olympics.) In 1901 she won the singles title at the German Championships, and in 1902 she won the Swiss Championship. Cooper Sterry remained active in competitive tennis and continued to play in championship events well into her 50s.

On 12 January 1901 she married Alfred Sterry, a solicitor, who became president of the Lawn Tennis Association. They had two children: Rex (1903–81) who was the vice-chairman of the All England Club for a period of 15 years during the 1960s and 1970s and Gwen (1905–87), a tennis player who participated at Wimbledon and played on Britain's Wightman Cup team.

Cooper Sterry, who had been deaf since the age of 26, died on 10 October 1966 at the age of 96, in Helensburgh, Scotland.

She was inducted into the International Tennis Hall of Fame in 2013.

== Playing style ==
Cooper Sterry had an offensive style of playing, attacking the net when the opportunity arose. She was one of a few female players of her time who served overhead. Her main strengths were her steadiness, temperament and tactical ability. Her excellent volleying skills stood out at a time when this was still a rarity in ladies tennis.

== Grand Slam finals ==
=== Singles: 11 (5 titles, 6 runners-up) ===
Result	Year	Championship	Surface	Opponent	Score
Win	1895	Wimbledon (1)	Grass	(United Kingdom of Great Britain and Ireland) Helen Jackson Atkins	7–5, 8–6
Win	1896	Wimbledon (2)	Grass	(United Kingdom of Great Britain and Ireland) Alice Simpson Pickering	6–2, 6–3
Loss	1897	Wimbledon	Grass	(United Kingdom of Great Britain and Ireland) Blanche Bingley Hillyard	7–5, 5–7, 2–6
Win	1898 (Note: This was actually the all-comers final as Blanche Bingley Hillyard did not defend her 1897 Wimbledon title, which resulted in the winner of the all-comers final winning the challenge round and, thus, Wimbledon in 1898 by walkover.)	Wimbledon (3)	Grass	(United Kingdom of Great Britain and Ireland) Louisa Martin	6–4, 6–4
Loss	1899	Wimbledon	Grass	(United Kingdom of Great Britain and Ireland) Blanche Bingley Hillyard	2–6, 3–6
Loss	1900	Wimbledon	Grass	(United Kingdom of Great Britain and Ireland) Blanche Bingley Hillyard	6–4, 4–6, 4–6
Win	1901	Wimbledon (4)	Grass	(United Kingdom of Great Britain and Ireland) Blanche Bingley Hillyard	6–2, 6–2
Loss	1902	Wimbledon	Grass	(United Kingdom of Great Britain and Ireland) Muriel Robb	5–7, 1–6
Loss	1904	Wimbledon	Grass	(United Kingdom of Great Britain and Ireland) Dorothea Lambert Chambers	0–6, 3–6
Win	1908 (Note: This was actually the all-comers final as May Sutton did not defend her 1907 Wimbledon title, which resulted in the winner of the all-comers final winning the challenge round and, thus, Wimbledon in 1908 by walkover.)	Wimbledon (5)	Grass	(United Kingdom of Great Britain and Ireland) Agnes Morton	6–4, 6–4
Loss	1912	Wimbledon	Grass	(United Kingdom of Great Britain and Ireland) Ethel Thomson Larcombe	3–6, 1–6

=== Doubles: 1 (1 runner-up) ===
Result	Year	Championship	Surface	Partner	Opponents	Score
Loss	1913	Wimbledon	Grass	(United Kingdom) Dorothea Douglass	(United Kingdom) Winifred McNair (United Kingdom) Dora Boothby	4–6, 2–4 ret.
