= Josef Straßberger =

German weightlifter (1894–1950)

Olympic medal record

Representing Germany

Men's weightlifting
Gold medal – first place	1928 Amsterdam	+82.5 kg
Bronze medal – third place	1932 Los Angeles	+82.5 kg

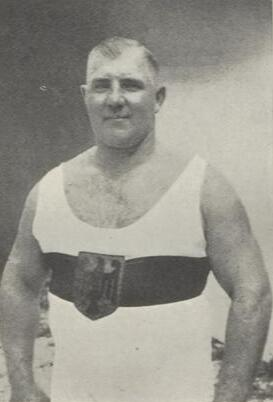
Josef Straßberger in 1928

Josef Straßberger (August 20, 1894 – October 10, 1950) was a German weightlifter who competed at the 1928 and 1932 Olympic Games. He won the gold medal in the heavyweight division in Amsterdam and the bronze medal in the same division in Los Angeles. He was born in Kolbermoor, Bavaria and died in Munich.
