= Tennis at the Summer Olympics =

- IOC Code: TEN
- Governing body: World Tennis
- Events: 5 (men: 2; women: 2; mixed: 1)

Summer Olympics
- 1896; 1900; 1904; 1908; 1912; 1920; 1924; 1928; 1932; 1936; 1948; 1952; 1956; 1960; 1964; 1968; 1972; 1976; 1980; 1984; 1988; 1992; 1996; 2000; 2004; 2008; 2012; 2016; 2020; 2024; 2028; 2032; Note: demonstration or exhibition sport years indicated in italics
- Medalists

Tennis was part of the Summer Olympic Games program from the inaugural 1896 Summer Olympics, but was dropped after the 1924 Summer Olympics due to disputes between the International Lawn Tennis Federation and the International Olympic Committee over how to define amateur players. After two appearances as a demonstration sport in 1968 and 1984 (with a U-21 age limit), it returned as a full medal sport at the 1988 Summer Olympics open for all players regardless of their age and status and has been played at every summer Games since then.

== Medals ==
In 1896, 1900, 1904, 1988, 1992, semifinal losers shared bronze medals. In all other years, a playoff match for the bronze medal was staged. The Olympic tournaments have increased in perceived importance since their reintroduction, with some players, critics and sports pundits considering winning gold at the Olympics just as prestigious as winning a major title and some considering it even more prestigious.

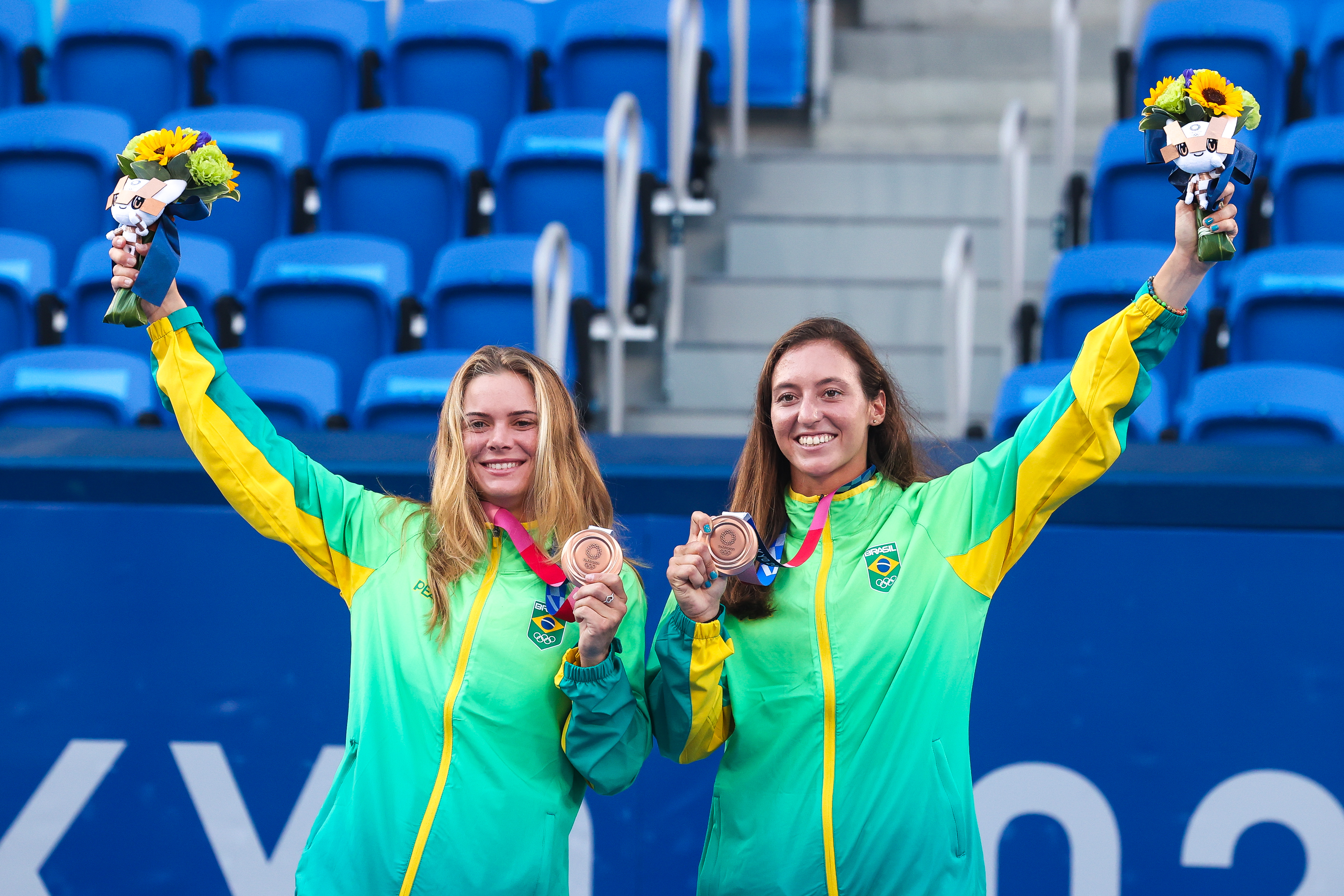
Laura Pigossi and Luisa Stefani from Brazil, winners of the women’s doubles bronze medal at the 2020 Summer Olympic Games

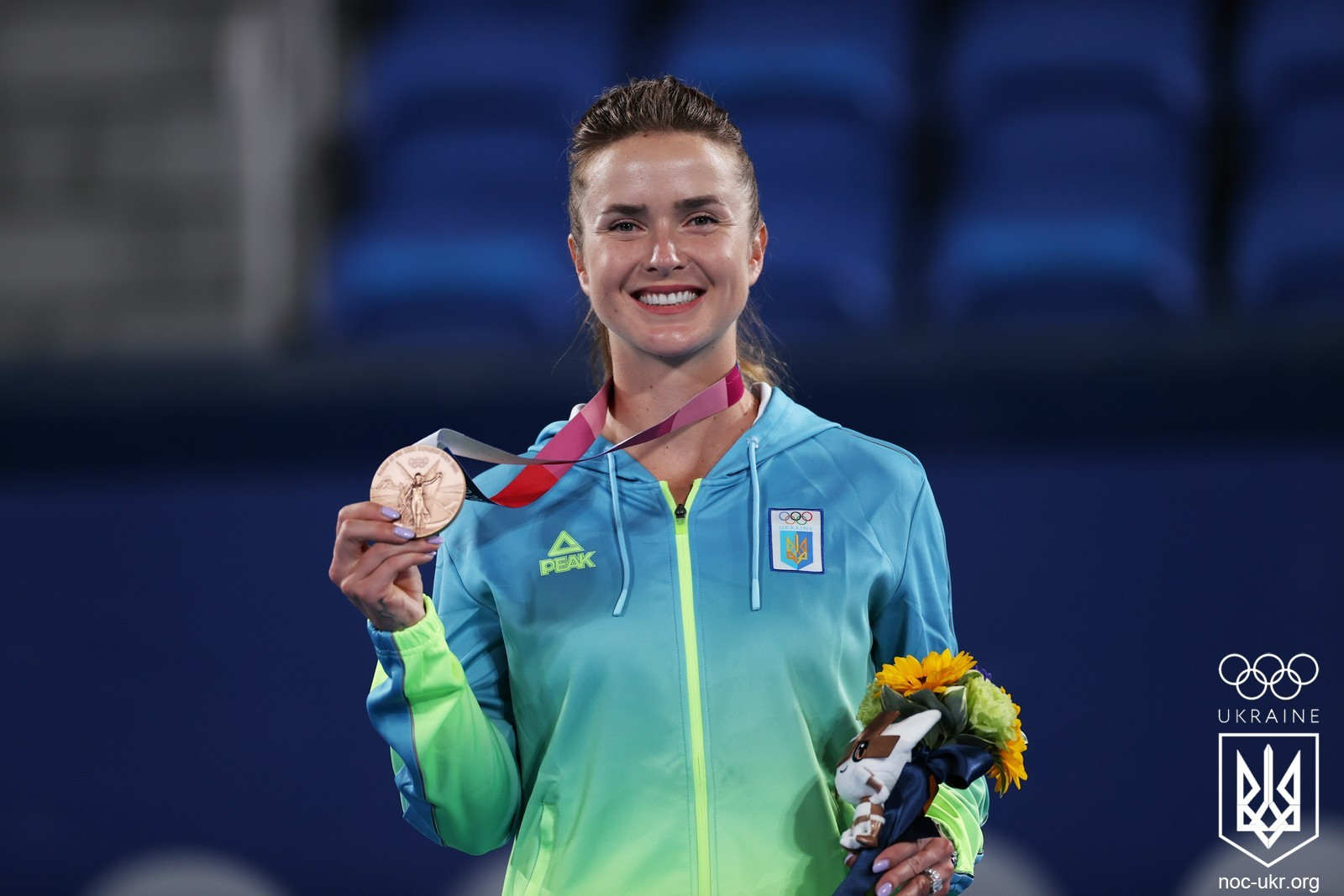
Ukraine's Elina Svitolina with her bronze Olympic medal

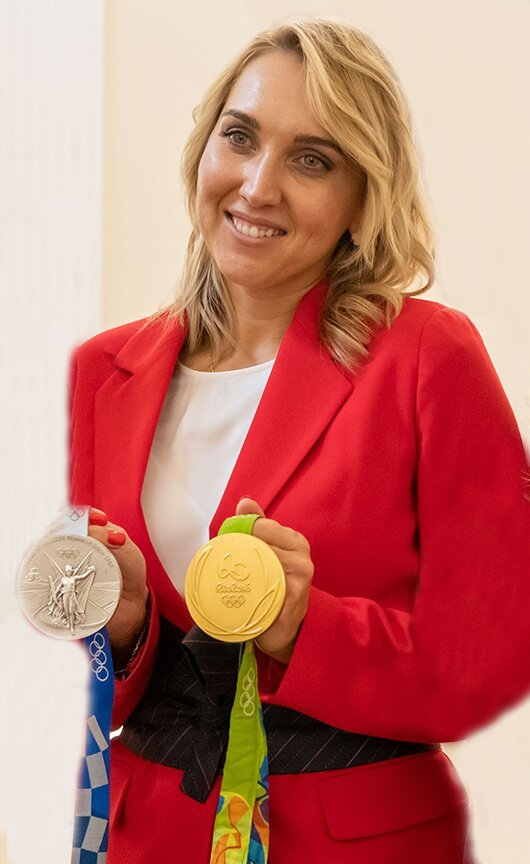
Elena Vesnina with her mixed doubles silver and women's doubles gold Olympic medals

=== Gold medal records ===
Both Serena and Venus Williams have each won a record four gold medals, three each as a doubles pairing, the only players to win the same Olympic event on three occasions. Venus Williams (four gold, one silver) and Kathleen McKane Godfree (one gold, two silvers, and two bronzes) are the all-time record holders for the most Olympic tennis medals, with five each. Andy Murray is the only player to have won two singles gold medals, and the only singles player to have retained the Olympic title. Nicolás Massú, Venus Williams, and Serena Williams are the only players in the Open Era to win both the singles and same-sex doubles tournaments at one Games, doing so in 2004, 2000, and 2012 respectively.

=== Golden Slams ===
A player who wins an Olympic or Paralympic gold medal and all four majors in the same year is said to have won a Golden Slam, while a player that has won all four Grand Slam titles and Olympic gold during their career has a 'career Golden Slam'. As of 2026, Steffi Graf (in 1988) is the only player to have won a single-year Golden Slam. Gigi Fernandez, Serena Williams and Venus Williams are the only players to complete career Golden Slam in doubles twice. In men's tennis, Andre Agassi, Rafael Nadal and Novak Djokovic each won career Golden Slams. Multiple doubles players have achieved the feat, with Serena Williams the only player to complete the career Golden Slam in both singles and doubles. In 2021, wheelchair tennis players Diede de Groot and Dylan Alcott achieved the equivalent wheelchair tennis prize with Paralympic gold, with Alcott additionally completing the single-year Golden Slam.

=== Tiebreaker games ===
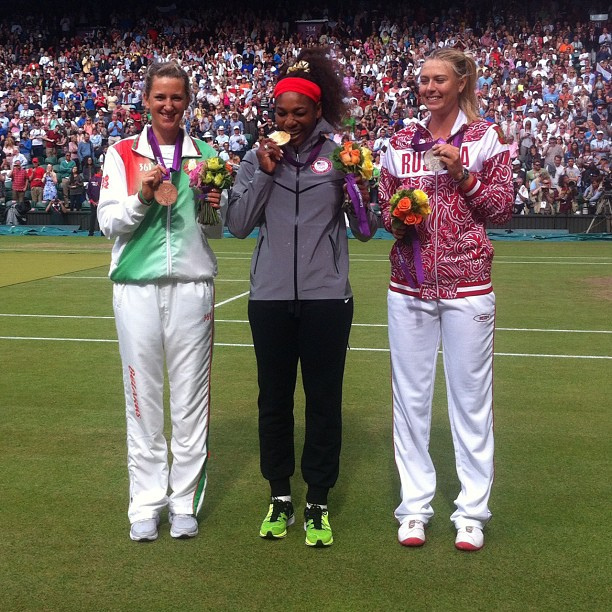
2012 Women's Singles medalists, Serena Williams (center), Maria Sharapova (right) and Victoria Azarenka (left)

Since 2021, the deciding set (third) has a 7-point tiebreaker game to decide the match at 6-all. Should the tiebreaker game be tied at 6-all, whoever first establishes a clear two point lead wins the set and the match.

== Summary ==
Year	Events	Best Nation
1896	2	Great Britain (1)
1900	4	Great Britain (2)
1904	2	United States (1)
1908	6	Great Britain (3)
1912	8	France (1)
1920	5	Great Britain (4)
1924	5	United States (2)
1968	10	Mexico (1)
1984	2	West Germany (1)
1988	4	United States (3)
1992	4	United States (4)
1996	4	United States (5)
2000	4	United States (6)
2004	4	Chile (1)
2008	4	Russia (1)
2012	5	United States (7)
2016	5	United States (8)
2020	5	ROC (1)
2024	5	China (1)

== Surface ==
The playing surface of the court varies between Olympic Games. It has been on hard court for every Olympics since 1984 except for the 1992 and 2024 Olympics (which were on a clay court) and the 2012 Olympics (which was played on a grass court).

The 1908 and the 1920 editions of the Olympics were the two other instances that tennis was played on grass courts.

The 1908 and 1912 editions of the Olympic games were the only instances that indoor tennis competitions were contested alongside the outdoor ones, but since then it has only been outdoor. Those indoor competitions were also the only instances that wooden surfaces were used for tennis at the Olympics.

From the 1896 until the 1904 editions of the Olympics, tennis was contested on clay courts. Clay courts were in use again for the 1912, 1924 and at the 1968 editions of the Olympics, but would only be used again at the 1992 Olympics.

The changing playing surface gives certain players different advantages and disadvantages not seen in most other Olympic sports. On three occasions, the event has been held, wholly or partly, at a Grand Slam venue - twice at the All-England Tennis Club at Wimbledon (1908 and 2012) and once at Roland Garros in Paris (2024).

== Events ==
(d) = demonstration event, (e) = exhibition event

Event	96	00	04	08	12	20	24	28–64	68	72–80	84	88	92	96	00	04	08	12	16	20	24	28	Editions
Men's singles	X	X	X	X	X	X	X		(d, e)		(d)	X	X	X	X	X	X	X	X	X	X	X	18
Men's doubles	X	X	X	X	X	X	X		(d, e)			X	X	X	X	X	X	X	X	X	X	X	18
Women's singles		X		X	X	X	X		(d, e)		(d)	X	X	X	X	X	X	X	X	X	X	X	16
Women's doubles						X	X		(d, e)			X	X	X	X	X	X	X	X	X	X	X	14
Mixed doubles		X			X	X	X		(d, e)	Not yet reintroduced								X	X	X	X	X	9
Men's singles (indoor)				X	X	Not occurred since																	2
Men's doubles (indoor)				X	X	Not occurred since																	2
Women's singles (indoor)				X	X	Not occurred since																	2
Mixed doubles (indoor)					X	Not occurred since																	1
Total	2	4	2	6	8	5	5	—	0	—	0	4	4	4	4	4	4	5	5	5	5	5	18

Surface	96	00	04	08	12	20	24	28–64	68	72–80	84	88	92	96	00	04	08	12	16	20	24	28	Years
Indoor				X	X																		2
Outdoor	X	X	X	X	X	X	X	X		X		X	X	X	X	X	X	X	X	X	X	X	20
Carpet																							0
Clay	X	X	X		X		X	X					X								X		8
Grass				X		X												X					3
Hard										X		X		X	X	X	X		X	X		X	9
Wood				X	X																		2

== Champions and venues ==
‡ Players who won two events at the same Games.

List of gold medalists and venues where the Games took place listed below.

=== Amateur Era (1896–1924) ===
Event	Venue	Surface	Men's singles	Women's singles	Men's doubles	Women's doubles	Mixed doubles
1896 Athens	Athens Lawn Tennis Club	Clay	(United Kingdom) John Boland^{‡}	Not held	(United Kingdom) John Boland^{‡} (German Empire) Friedrich Traun	Not held	Not held
1900 Paris	Cercle des Sports, Île de Puteaux	Clay	(United Kingdom) Laurence Doherty^{‡}	(United Kingdom) Charlotte Cooper^{‡}	(United Kingdom) Laurence Doherty^{‡} (United Kingdom) Reginald Doherty^{‡}	Not held	(United Kingdom) Charlotte Cooper^{‡} (United Kingdom) Reginald Doherty^{‡}
1904 St. Louis	Francis Field	Clay	(United States) Beals Wright^{‡}	Not held	(United States) Beals Wright^{‡} (United States) Edgar Leonard	Not held	Not held
1908 London	Queen's Club (indoor)	Wood	(United Kingdom) Arthur Gore^{‡}	(United Kingdom) Gwendoline Eastlake-Smith	(United Kingdom) Herbert Roper Barrett (United Kingdom) Arthur Gore^{‡}	Not held	Not held
1908 London	All England Club	Grass	(United Kingdom) Major Ritchie	(United Kingdom) Dorothea Lambert Chambers	(United Kingdom) Reginald Doherty (2) (United Kingdom) George Hillyard	Not held	Not held
1912 Stockholm	Östermalm Tennis Pavilion (indoor)	Wood	(France) André Gobert^{‡}	(United Kingdom) Edith Hannam^{‡}	(France) Maurice Germot (France) André Gobert^{‡}	Not held	(United Kingdom) Edith Hannam^{‡} (United Kingdom) Charles Dixon
1912 Stockholm	Östermalm Tennis Pavilion	Clay	(South Africa) Charles Winslow^{‡}	(France) Marguerite Broquedis	(South Africa) Harold Kitson (South Africa) Charles Winslow^{‡}	Not held	(German Empire) Dorothea Köring (German Empire) Heinrich Schomburgk
1920 Antwerp	Beerschot Tennis Club	Grass	(South Africa) Louis Raymond	(France) Suzanne Lenglen^{‡}	(United Kingdom) Noel Turnbull (United Kingdom) Max Woosnam	(United Kingdom) Kathleen McKane (United Kingdom) Winifred McNair	(France) Suzanne Lenglen^{‡} (France) Max Decugis
1924 Paris	Stade Olympique Yves-du-Manoir	Clay	(United States) Vincent Richards^{‡}	(United States) Helen Wills^{‡}	(United States) Francis Hunter (United States) Vincent Richards^{‡}	(United States) Hazel Wightman^{‡} (United States) Helen Wills^{‡}	(United States) Hazel Wightman^{‡} (United States) R. Norris Williams

=== Open Era (1988–present) ===
Event	Venue	Surface	Men's singles	Women's singles	Men's doubles	Women's doubles	Mixed doubles
1988 Seoul	Seoul Olympic Park Tennis Center	Hard	(Czechoslovakia) Miloslav Mečíř	(West Germany) Steffi Graf	(United States) Ken Flach (United States) Robert Seguso	(United States) Pam Shriver (United States) Zina Garrison	Not held
1992 Barcelona	Tennis de la Vall d'Hebron	Clay	(Switzerland) Marc Rosset	(United States) Jennifer Capriati	(Germany) Boris Becker (Germany) Michael Stich	(United States) Gigi Fernández (United States) Mary Joe Fernández	Not held
1996 Atlanta	Stone Mountain Tennis Center	Hard	(United States) Andre Agassi	(United States) Lindsay Davenport	(Australia) Todd Woodbridge (Australia) Mark Woodforde	(United States) Gigi Fernández (2) (United States) Mary Joe Fernández (2)	Not held
2000 Sydney	Sydney Olympic Park Tennis Centre	Hard	(Russia) Yevgeny Kafelnikov	(United States) Venus Williams^{‡}	(Canada) Sébastien Lareau (Canada) Daniel Nestor	(United States) Serena Williams (United States) Venus Williams^{‡}	Not held
2004 Athens	Athens Olympic Tennis Centre	Hard	(Chile) Nicolás Massú^{‡}	(Belgium) Justine Henin	(Chile) Fernando González (Chile) Nicolás Massú^{‡}	(China) Li Ting (China) Sun Tiantian	Not held
2008 Beijing	National Tennis Center	Hard	(Spain) Rafael Nadal	(Russia) Elena Dementieva	(Switzerland) Roger Federer (Switzerland) Stanislas Wawrinka	(United States) Serena Williams (2) (United States) Venus Williams (2)	Not held
2012 London	All England Club	Grass	(United Kingdom) Andy Murray	(United States) Serena Williams^{‡}	(United States) Bob Bryan (United States) Mike Bryan	(United States) Serena Williams^{‡} (3) (United States) Venus Williams (3)	(Belarus) Victoria Azarenka (Belarus) Max Mirnyi
2016 Rio de Janeiro	Olympic Tennis Centre	Hard	(United Kingdom) Andy Murray (2)	(Puerto Rico) Monica Puig	(Spain) Marc López (Spain) Rafael Nadal	(Russia) Ekaterina Makarova (Russia) Elena Vesnina	(United States) Bethanie Mattek-Sands (United States) Jack Sock
2020 Tokyo	Ariake Tennis Park	Hard	(Germany) Alexander Zverev	(Switzerland) Belinda Bencic	(Croatia) Nikola Mektić (Croatia) Mate Pavić	(Czech Republic) Barbora Krejčíková (Czech Republic) Kateřina Siniaková	Anastasia Pavlyuchenkova; Andrey Rublev
2024 Paris	Stade Roland Garros	Clay	(Serbia) Novak Djokovic	(China) Zheng Qinwen	(Australia) Matthew Ebden (Australia) John Peers	(Italy) Sara Errani (Italy) Jasmine Paolini	(Czech Republic) Kateřina Siniaková (Czech Republic) Tomáš Macháč
2028 Los Angeles	Dignity Health Sports Park	Hard					
2032 Brisbane	Queensland Tennis Centre	Hard					

== Participating nations ==
Nation	96	00	04	08	12	20	24	28–64	68	72–80	84	88	92	96	00	04	08	12	16	20	24	28	Editions
Algeria	–	–	–	–	–	–	–		–		–	1	–	–	–	1	–	–	–	–	–		2
Argentina	–	–	–	–	–	–	5		–		1	5	6	8	8	9	6	7	6	7	8		11
Armenia	–	–	–	–	–	–	–		–		–	–	–	1	1	1	–	–	–	–	–		3
Australasia	–	–	–	–	1	–	–		–		–	–	–	–	–	–	–	–	–	–	–		1
Australia	1	2	–	–	–	1	2		–		3	6	7	7	10	7	8	6	10	10	9		14
Austria	–	–	–	3	3	–	–		–		2	3	5	1	3	1	3	3	2	2	1		12
Bahamas	–	–	–	–	–	–	–		–		–	–	2	2	2	2	2	–	–	–	–		5
Barbados	–	–	–	–	–	–	–		–		–	–	–	–	–	–	–	–	1	–	–		1
Belarus	–	–	–	–	–	–	–		–		–	–	–	2	4	2	5	3	2	3	–		7
Belgium	–	–	–	–	–	16	8		–		–	–	1	3	3	3	2	5	3	4	3		10
Benin	–	–	–	–	–	–	–		–		–	–	–	–	1	–	–	–	–	–	–		1
Bermuda	–	–	–	–	–	–	–		–		–	1	–	–	–	–	–	–	–	–	–		1
Bohemia	–	1	–	4	8	–	–		–		–	–	–	–	–	–	–	–	–	–	–		3
Bolivia	–	–	–	–	–	–	–		–		–	–	–	–	1	–	–	–	–	1	–		2
Bosnia and Herzegovina	–	–	–	–	–	–	–		–		–	–	–	–	–	1	–	–	2	–	–		2
Brazil	–	–	–	–	–	–	–		1		1	3	4	3	4	3	4	4	7	7	5		11
Bulgaria	–	–	–	–	–	–	–		–		–	2	3	2	–	1	1	2	2	–	1		7
Canada	–	–	–	3	–	–	–		–		2	7	5	6	4	2	3	5	4	4	5		11
Chile	–	–	–	–	–	–	2		–		–	–	1	2	2	2	2	–	2	1	3		8
China	–	–	–	–	–	–	–		–		1	2	5	4	3	4	8	4	5	5	7		10
Chinese Taipei	–	–	–	–	–	–	–		–		1	–	–	3	2	1	3	3	5	5	4		8
Colombia	–	–	–	–	–	–	–		–		–	–	–	–	2	2	–	4	3	4	1		5
Costa Rica	–	–	–	–	–	–	–		–		–	–	–	–	1	–	–	–	–	–	–		1
Ivory Coast	–	–	–	–	–	–	–		–		–	1	–	2	–	–	–	–	–	–	–		2
Croatia	–	–	–	–	–	–	–		–		–	–	2	4	5	5	1	2	4	6	4		8
Cyprus	–	–	–	–	–	–	–		–		–	–	–	–	–	1	–	1	–	–	–		2
Czech Republic	–	–	–	–	–	–	–		–		–	–	–	4	7	8	11	8	7	6	7		7
Czechoslovakia	–	–	–	–	–	7	5		–		–	5	5	–	–	–	–	–	–	–	–		4
Denmark	–	–	–	–	10	3	5		2		1	3	2	2	1	–	1	1	1	–	2		12
Dominican Republic	–	–	–	–	–	–	–		–		–	–	–	1	–	–	–	–	1	–	–		2
Ecuador	–	–	–	–	–	–	–		4		–	–	–	3	–	–	1	–	–	–	–		3
Egypt	–	–	–	–	–	–	–		–		–	–	–	–	–	–	–	–	–	2	1		1
El Salvador	–	–	–	–	–	–	–		–		–	–	–	–	–	–	1	–	–	–	–		1
Estonia	–	–	–	–	–	–	–		–		–	–	–	–	–	2	2	–	–	1	–		3
Finland	–	–	–	–	–	–	4		–		1	–	–	–	–	1	1	1	–	–	–		5
France	1	14	–	1	6	10	10		2		4	5	7	4	7	9	8	7	9	10	9		17
Georgia	–	–	–	–	–	–	–		–		–	–	–	–	–	–	–	2	1	1	–		3
Germany	1	–	1	5	7	–	–		–		–	–	6	3	5	4	2	7	8	9	10		12
Great Britain	2	6	–	22	11	8	10		–		3	5	6	5	6	1	2	8	7	6	7		16
Greece	7	–	–	–	–	1	3		–		2	3	4	2	1	4	2	–	–	2	4		11
Haiti	–	–	–	–	–	–	–		–		1	1	–	1	1	–	–	–	–	–	–		4
Hong Kong	–	–	–	–	–	–	–		–		1	–	–	–	–	–	–	–	–	–	–		1
Hungary	1	–	–	3	6	–	5		–		–	2	1	5	5	4	2	2	2	–	2		12
India	–	–	–	–	–	–	6		–		1	3	2	2	4	2	4	7	4	3	3		11
Individual Neutral Athletes	–	–	–	–	–	–	–		–		-	-	-	-	-	-	–	–	–	–	7		7
Indonesia	–	–	–	–	–	–	–		–		1	3	5	2	2	2	–	–	–	–	–		6
Ireland	–	–	–	–	–	–	4		–		–	2	2	2	–	–	–	–	–	–	–		4
Israel	–	–	–	–	–	–	–		–		1	4	1	–	–	3	4	3	1	–	–		7
Italy	–	–	–	–	–	4	8		3		4	5	8	8	6	6	8	7	7	6	8		13
Japan	–	–	–	–	–	2	4		2		2	4	5	7	5	4	3	3	6	11	6		13
Kazakhstan	–	–	–	–	–	–	–		–		–	–	–	–	–	–	–	3	2	7	3		3
Latvia	–	–	–	–	–	–	–		–		–	–	2	–	–	–	1	–	1	2	1		4
Lebanon	–	–	–	–	–	–	–		–		–	–	–	–	–	–	–	-	-	–	2		2
Liechtenstein	–	–	–	–	–	–	–		–		–	–	–	–	–	–	–	1	1	–	–		2
Lithuania	–	–	–	–	–	–	–		–		–	–	–	–	–	–	–	–	1	–	–		1
Luxembourg	–	–	–	–	–	–	1		–		–	–	–	1	1	2	–	1	1	–	–		6
Madagascar	–	–	–	–	–	–	–		–		–	–	2	2	–	1	–	–	–	–	–		3
Mexico	–	–	–	–	–	–	2		6		1	5	4	3	2	–	–	–	2	2	–		9
Moldova	–	–	–	–	–	–	–		–		–	–	–	–	–	–	–	–	1	–	–		1
Montenegro	–	–	–	–	–	–	–		–		–	–	–	–	–	–	–	–	1	–	2		1
Morocco	–	–	–	–	–	–	–		–		1	–	2	1	1	2	–	–	–	–	–		5
Netherlands	–	–	–	2	1	–	5		–		1	1	5	5	3	–	–	2	3	4	6		11
New Zealand	–	–	–	–	–	–	–		–		–	3	–	1	–	–	1	1	2	2	2		6
Nigeria	–	–	–	–	–	–	–		–		1	3	–	1	–	–	–	–	–	–	–		3
Norway	–	–	–	–	7	3	4		–		–	–	2	1	1	–	–	–	–	–	1		6
Paraguay	–	–	–	–	–	–	–		–		–	2	2	–	1	–	–	1	1	1	–		6
Peru	–	–	–	–	–	–	–		–		3	–	2	–	–	1	–	–	–	1	–		4
Philippines	–	–	–	–	–	–	–		–		1	–	–	–	–	–	–	–	–	–	–		1
Poland	–	–	–	–	–	–	–		–		–	1	3	2	–	2	6	7	7	6	4		8
Portugal	–	–	–	–	–	–	1		–		–	–	2	2	2	–	–	–	2	2	2		6
Puerto Rico	–	–	–	–	–	–	–		3		1	–	2	–	–	1	–	–	1	–	–		5
ROC	–	–	–	–	–	–	–		–		–	–	–	–	–	–	–	–	–	8	–		1
Romania	–	–	–	–	–	4	3		–		–	–	5	4	3	2	2	5	6	3	–		9
Russia	–	–	–	–	2	–	–		–		–	–	–	4	5	9	9	10	8	–	–		7
Serbia and Montenegro	–	–	–	–	–	–	–		–		–	–	–	–	–	1	–	–	–	–	–		1
Serbia	–	–	–	–	–	–	–		–		–	–	–	–	–	–	4	6	6	5	2		4
Slovakia	–	–	–	–	–	–	–		–		–	–	–	5	5	7	4	4	3	3	1		7
Slovenia	–	–	–	–	–	–	–		–		–	–	4	–	3	4	–	4	1	–	–		5
South Africa	–	–	–	3	3	5	4		–		–	–	6	6	5	–	2	–	–	–	–		8
Soviet Union	–	–	–	–	–	–	–		4		–	7	–	–	–	–	–	–	–	–	–		2
South Korea	–	–	–	–	–	–	–		–		1	5	4	5	4	2	1	–	–	1	–		8
Spain	–	–	–	–	–	4	8		3		2	4	6	7	7	11	9	12	9	8	8		13
Sweden	–	–	–	4	16	8	4		1		2	3	6	4	5	4	5	3	1	1	–		15
Switzerland	–	–	–	–	–	3	4		–		2	2	4	3	3	4	5	2	2	2	–		12
Thailand	–	–	–	–	–	–	–		–		–	–	2	2	3	2	1	–	2	–	–		6
Togo	–	–	–	–	–	–	–		–		–	–	–	–	–	–	1	–	–	–	–		1
Tunisia	–	–	–	–	–	–	–		–		–	–	–	1	–	–	1	2	2	1	1		5
Turkey	–	–	–	–	–	–	–		–		–	–	–	–	–	–	–	–	1	–	–		1
Ukraine	–	–	–	–	–	–	–		–		–	–	–	–	2	2	4	2	6	4	5		6
Unified Team	–	–	–	–	–	–	–		–		–	–	5	–	–	–	–	–	–	–	–		1
United States	–	5	35	–	1	–	9		6		7	7	7	7	10	10	10	12	11	11	11		15
Uruguay	–	–	–	–	–	–	–		–		–	–	–	1	–	–	–	–	1	1	–		3
Uzbekistan	–	–	–	–	–	–	–		–		–	–	–	2	1	–	1	1	1	–	–		5
Venezuela	–	–	–	–	–	–	–		–		–	–	–	3	4	1	1	–	–	–	–		4
West Germany	–	–	–	–	–	–	–		4		3	5	–	–	–	–	–	–	–	–	–		3
Yugoslavia	–	–	–	–	–	–	1	–	2	3	–	–	–	–	–	–	–	–	–	–	–		3
Zimbabwe	–	–	–	–	–	–	–	–	1	3	2	2	3	3	1	–	–	–	–	–	–		7
Nations total	6	4	2	10	14	14	27	-	15	-	34	38	48	55	52	52	48	44	56	45	40		—
Players total	13	26	36	50	82	75	124	-	45	-	64	129	177	176	182	170	169	184	199	191	175		—

== Medal tables ==
=== All-time ===
Rank	Nation	Gold	Silver	Bronze	Total
1	United States	21	7	13	41
2	Great Britain	17	14	12	43
3	France	5	6	8	19
4	Germany	4	6	3	13
5	Russia	3	3	2	8
6	Switzerland	3	3	0	6
7	South Africa	3	2	1	6
8	Spain	2	8	5	15
9	Czech Republic	2	3	4	9
10	Australia	2	1	4	7
11	Chile	2	1	1	4
11	China	2	1	1	4
13	Croatia	1	2	3	6
13	Mixed team	1	2	3	6
15	ROC	1	2	0	3
16	Czechoslovakia	1	1	2	4
17	Italy	1	0	2	3
18	Belarus	1	0	1	2
18	Belgium	1	0	1	2
18	Canada	1	0	1	2
18	Serbia	1	0	1	2
22	Puerto Rico	1	0	0	1
23	Sweden	0	3	5	8
24	Argentina	0	2	3	5
25	Greece	0	2	1	3
25	Japan	0	2	1	3
27	Netherlands	0	1	1	2
28	Austria	0	1	0	1
28	Denmark	0	1	0	1
28	Romania	0	1	0	1
–	Individual Neutral Athletes	0	1	0	1
31	Unified Team	0	0	2	2
32	Australasia	0	0	1	1
32	Bohemia	0	0	1	1
32	Brazil	0	0	1	1
32	Bulgaria	0	0	1	1
32	Hungary	0	0	1	1
32	India	0	0	1	1
32	New Zealand	0	0	1	1
32	Norway	0	0	1	1
32	Poland	0	0	1	1
32	Ukraine	0	0	1	1
Totals (41 entries)		76	76	91	243

=== Open Era ===
Rank	Nation	Gold	Silver	Bronze	Total
1	United States	14	4	8	26
2	Germany	3	4	2	9
3	Russia	3	3	2	8
4	Switzerland	3	3	0	6
5	Spain	2	8	5	15
6	Czech Republic	2	3	4	9
7	Great Britain	2	2	0	4
8	Australia	2	1	4	7
9	Chile	2	1	1	4
9	China	2	1	1	4
11	Croatia	1	2	3	6
12	ROC	1	2	0	3
13	Czechoslovakia	1	1	1	3
14	Belarus	1	0	1	2
14	Belgium	1	0	1	2
14	Canada	1	0	1	2
14	Italy	1	0	1	2
14	Serbia	1	0	1	2
19	Puerto Rico	1	0	0	1
20	Argentina	0	2	3	5
21	France	0	2	2	4
22	Sweden	0	1	2	3
23	Netherlands	0	1	0	1
23	Romania	0	1	0	1
23	South Africa	0	1	0	1
–	Individual Neutral Athletes	0	1	0	1
26	Unified Team	0	0	2	2
27	Brazil	0	0	1	1
27	Bulgaria	0	0	1	1
27	India	0	0	1	1
27	Japan	0	0	1	1
27	New Zealand	0	0	1	1
27	Poland	0	0	1	1
27	Ukraine	0	0	1	1
Totals (33 entries)		44	44	52	140

=== Amateur Era ===
Rank	Nation	Gold	Silver	Bronze	Total
1	Great Britain	15	12	12	39
2	United States	7	3	5	15
3	France	5	4	6	15
4	South Africa	3	1	1	5
5	Mixed team	1	2	3	6
6	Germany	1	2	1	4
7	Sweden	0	2	3	5
8	Greece	0	2	1	3
9	Japan	0	2	0	2
10	Austria	0	1	0	1
10	Denmark	0	1	0	1
12	Australasia	0	0	1	1
12	Bohemia	0	0	1	1
12	Czechoslovakia	0	0	1	1
12	Hungary	0	0	1	1
12	Italy	0	0	1	1
12	Netherlands	0	0	1	1
12	Norway	0	0	1	1
Totals (18 entries)		32	32	39	103

== Multiple medal winners ==
Total	Name	Gold	Silver	Bronze
5	(United States) Venus Williams	4	1	0
4	(United States) Serena Williams	4	0	0
4	(United Kingdom) Reginald Doherty	3	0	1
3	(United States) Vincent Richards	2	1	0
3	(United Kingdom) Andy Murray	2	1	0
3	(United Kingdom) Laurence Doherty	2	0	1
3	(United States) Mary Joe Fernández	2	0	1
3	(France) Suzanne Lenglen	2	0	1
3	(South Africa) Charles Winslow	2	0	1
2	(Czech Republic) Kateřina Siniaková	2	0	0
2	(Spain) Rafael Nadal	2	0	0
2	(United Kingdom) John Pius Boland	2	0	0
2	(United Kingdom) Charlotte Cooper	2	0	0
2	(United States) Gigi Fernández	2	0	0
2	(France) André Gobert	2	0	0
2	(United Kingdom) Arthur Gore	2	0	0
2	(United Kingdom) Edith Hannam	2	0	0
2	(Chile) Nicolás Massú	2	0	0
2	(United States) Hazel Wightman	2	0	0
2	(United States) Helen Wills Moody	2	0	0
2	(United States) Beals Wright	2	0	0
5	(United Kingdom) Kathleen McKane Godfree	1	2	2
4	(United Kingdom) Charles Dixon	1	1	2
3	(France) Max Décugis	1	1	1
3	(Chile) Fernando González	1	1	1
3	(Germany) Steffi Graf	1	1	1
3	(United Kingdom) Major Ritchie	1	1	1
2	(United Kingdom) Herbert Barrett	1	1	0
2	(Switzerland) Belinda Bencic	1	1	0
2	(Russia) Elena Dementieva	1	1	0
2	(Switzerland) Roger Federer	1	1	0
2	(South Africa) Harold Kitson	1	1	0
2	(Germany) Dorothea Köring	1	1	0
2	(Russia) / (Russia) Elena Vesnina	1	1	0
2	(Australia) Todd Woodbridge	1	1	0
2	(Australia) Mark Woodforde	1	1	0
2	(United Kingdom) Max Woosnam	1	1	0
3	(United States) Mike Bryan	1	0	2
2	(Serbia) Novak Djokovic	1	0	1
2	(Australia) John Peers	1	0	1
2	(Belarus) Victoria Azarenka	1	0	1
2	(France) Marguerite Broquedis	1	0	1
2	(United States) Bob Bryan	1	0	1
2	(United States) Zina Garrison	1	0	1
2	(United States) Edgar Leonard	1	0	1
2	(Czechoslovakia) Miloš Mečíř	1	0	1
2	(United States) Jack Sock	1	0	1
4	(Spain) Arantxa Sánchez Vicario	0	2	2
3	(United Kingdom) Harold Mahony	0	2	1
3	(Spain) Conchita Martínez	0	2	1
3	(Czech Republic) Jana Novotná	0	2	1
2	(United States) Rajeev Ram	0	2	0
2	(United Kingdom) George Caridia	0	2	0
2	(France) Henri Cochet	0	2	0
2	(United Kingdom) Dorothy Holman	0	2	0
2	(Greece) Dionysios Kasdaglis	0	2	0
2	(Japan) Ichiya Kumagae	0	2	0
2	(United States) Robert LeRoy	0	2	0
2	(France) Yvonne Prévost	0	2	0
2	(Spain) Virginia Ruano Pascual	0	2	0
2	(Czech Republic) Helena Suková	0	2	0
2	(United States) Alphonzo Bell	0	1	1
2	(Sweden) Sigrid Fick	0	1	1
2	(Argentina) Juan Martín del Potro	0	1	1
2	(Czech Republic) Lucie Hradecká	0	1	1
2	(France) Albert Canet	0	0	2
2	(Sweden) Stefan Edberg	0	0	2
2	(Croatia) Goran Ivanišević	0	0	2
2	(United States) Marion Jones	0	0	2
2	(United Kingdom) Arthur Norris	0	0	2
2	(Bohemia) Hedwiga Rosenbaumová	0	0	2

== Double crown ==
Players who won two events at the same Games listed below.

Year	Men's singles & men's doubles
1896	(United Kingdom) John Boland
1900	(United Kingdom) Laurence Doherty
1904	(United States) Beals Wright
1908	(United Kingdom) Arthur Gore
1912	(South Africa) Charles Winslow
2004	(Chile) Nicolás Massú

Year	Women's singles & women's doubles
1924	(United States) Helen Wills
2000	(United States) Venus Williams
2012	(United States) Serena Williams

Year	Men's doubles & mixed doubles
1900	(United Kingdom) Reginald Doherty

Year	Women's singles & mixed doubles
1900	(United Kingdom) Charlotte Cooper
1912	(United Kingdom) Edith Hannam
1920	(France) Suzanne Lenglen

== Point distribution ==
From the 2004 until the 2012 Summer Olympics, the ATP and the WTA Tours awarded ranking points, for singles players only, who competed at the Summer Olympics. This was discontinued beginning with the 2016 Summer Olympics.

=== 2004 ===
The breakdown of ranking points towards the ATP rankings is shown below:

Stage	Gold medal	Silver medal	Bronze medal	Fourth place	Quarterfinals	Round of 16	Round of 32	Round of 64
ATP Entry Ranking points	400	280	205	155	100	50	25	5
ATP Champions Race points	80	56	41	31	20	10	5	1

=== 2008 ===
Rankings points determine the position of a player in the ATP (men's) and WTA (women's) rankings, which are based on players' performances in the previous 52-weeks. For the Olympics, the men's player who won received 400 ranking points—put in perspective, this was 100 more than a win at the most prestigious International Series Gold tournaments, 100 less than a Masters Series win, and 600 less than a triumph at one of the four Grand Slam tournaments.

Stage	Gold medal	Silver medal	Bronze medal	Fourth place	Quarterfinals	Round of 16	Round of 32	Round of 64
Men's singles	400	280	205	155	100	50	25	5
Women's singles	353	245	175	135	90	48	28	1

=== 2012 ===
The points distribution for the Association of Tennis Professionals and the Women's Tennis Association tours, concerning only singles competition on the 2012 Olympic Games, is listed below. These points can be added to a player's world ranking for the 2012 season.

Stage	Gold medal	Silver medal	Bronze medal	Fourth place	Quarterfinals	Round of 16	Round of 32	Round of 64
Men's singles	750	450	340	270	135	70	35	5
Women's singles	685	470	340	260	175	95	55	1

== See also ==
- List of Olympic venues in tennis
- Tennis at the Summer Youth Olympics
- Tennis at the Mediterranean Games
- Tennis at the Pan American Games
- Wheelchair tennis at the Summer Paralympics
- List of Olympic medalists in tennis
- List of Canadian tennis players at the Summer Olympics
- List of Indian tennis players at the Summer Olympics
