= Yvonne Prévost =

French tennis player (1878–1942)

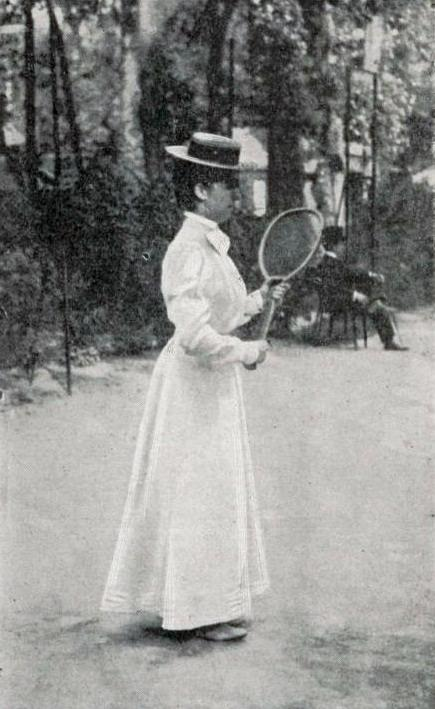
- Prévost in 1900
- Full name: Paule Marie Yvonne Prévost Boppe
- Country (sports): France
- Born: 8 June 1878 Dinard, France
- Died: 3 March 1942 (aged 63) Paris, France
Medal record
Representing France
Olympic Games
Silver medal – second place	1900 Paris	Singles
Representing a Mixed team
Silver medal – second place	1900 Paris	Mixed doubles

Paule Marie Yvonne (Note: In some sources also known as Hélène Prévost.) Prévost Boppe (French: [ivɔn pʁevo]; 8 June 1878 – 3 March 1942) was a French tennis player at the end of the 19th century. She won the French Women's Singles Championship in 1900.

At the 1900 Summer Olympics in Paris, she won two silver medals. In the women's singles final she lost to Charlotte Cooper and in the mixed doubles' event she and Harold Mahony were runners-up to Charlotte Cooper and Reginald Doherty.

== Early life ==
Yvonne Prévost was the daughter of Ernest Prévost, son of Hippolyte Prévost, and Jeanne Koenigswarter, daughter of the lawyer Louis-Jean Koenigswarter, a member of an important banking family from Austria. She was the sister of André Prévost, vice-champion of France in tennis in 1900.

== Career ==
Ranked "-40" in 1897 and 1902, Yvonne Prévost was a member of the sports society of the island of Puteaux and the Tennis Club of Paris.

In 1900, she became the French champion with no competitor to challenge for the title, which was quite common at that time. However, she is mainly known for having participated a few weeks later in the international tennis tournament organized by the S.S.I.P. during the Universal Exhibition, a tournament that would be considered an Olympic event. She won the silver medal in women's singles, losing in the final to three-time English champion Charlotte Cooper-Sterry. She was also a finalist in the mixed doubles' tournament, partnered with Harold Mahony of Ireland.

== Olympic finals ==
=== Singles (1 silver medal) ===
Result	Year	Olympics	Surface	Opponent	Score
Silver	1900	Paris, France	Clay	(United Kingdom) Charlotte Cooper	1–6, 4–6

=== Mixed Doubles (1 silver medal) ===
Result	Year	Olympics	Surface	Partner	Opponents	Score
Silver	1900	Paris, France	Clay	(United Kingdom) Harold Mahony	(United Kingdom) Charlotte Cooper (United Kingdom) Reginald Doherty	2–6, 4–6
