= Archibald Warden =

British tennis player

Olympic medal record

Men's tennis

Representing a Mixed team
Bronze medal – third place	1900 Paris	Mixed doubles

Archibald Adam Warden (11 May 1869 – October 1943) was a British tennis player who competed in the 1900 Summer Olympics.

In 1900 he won a bronze medal in mixed doubles event with Hedwiga Rosenbaumová of Bohemia.
