= Václav Pšenička Jr. =

Czech weightlifter

Personal information
- Nationality: Czech
- Born: 14 May 1931 Prague, Czechoslovakia
- Died: 31 December 2015 (aged 84) Prague, Czech Republic

Sport
- Sport: Weightlifting

Václav Pšenička Jr. (14 May 1931 – 31 December 2015) was a Czech weightlifter. He competed at the 1952 Summer Olympics and the 1956 Summer Olympics.

== Professional career and awards ==
Psenicka competed in the 75 kg and 82.5 kg weight classes for the Sokol Vinohrady, ATK Praha, Prague ÚDA, Prague and Spartak Prague clubs. He represented Czechoslovakia's national team from 1950 to 1963, and won the national championship eleven times (1950-1960). In 1960, he was the first weightlifter to be awarded the title of Merited Master of Sports of Czechoslovakia. He was honored with the Best Weightlifter of Czechoslovakia Award in 1954, 1955, 1956, 1957, 1958, 1959. Vaclav Psenicka was inducted into the Hall of Fame of the Czech Union of Weightlifting.

Psenicka competed in nine European Weightlifting Championships, taking second place in 1953 and 1955. He competed seven times in the World Weightlifting Championships, taking fourth place in 1954, 1958 and 1959. At the 1952 Summer Olympics in Helsinki, he took the eleventh place in the 75 kg class with the 350 kg total (100 + 107.5 + 142.5); and in the 1956 Summer Olympics in Melbourne he took sixth place in the 82.5 kg class with the 400 kg total (125 + 120 + 155).
