= Athletics at the 1900 Summer Olympics =

Athletics at the Games of the II Olympiad
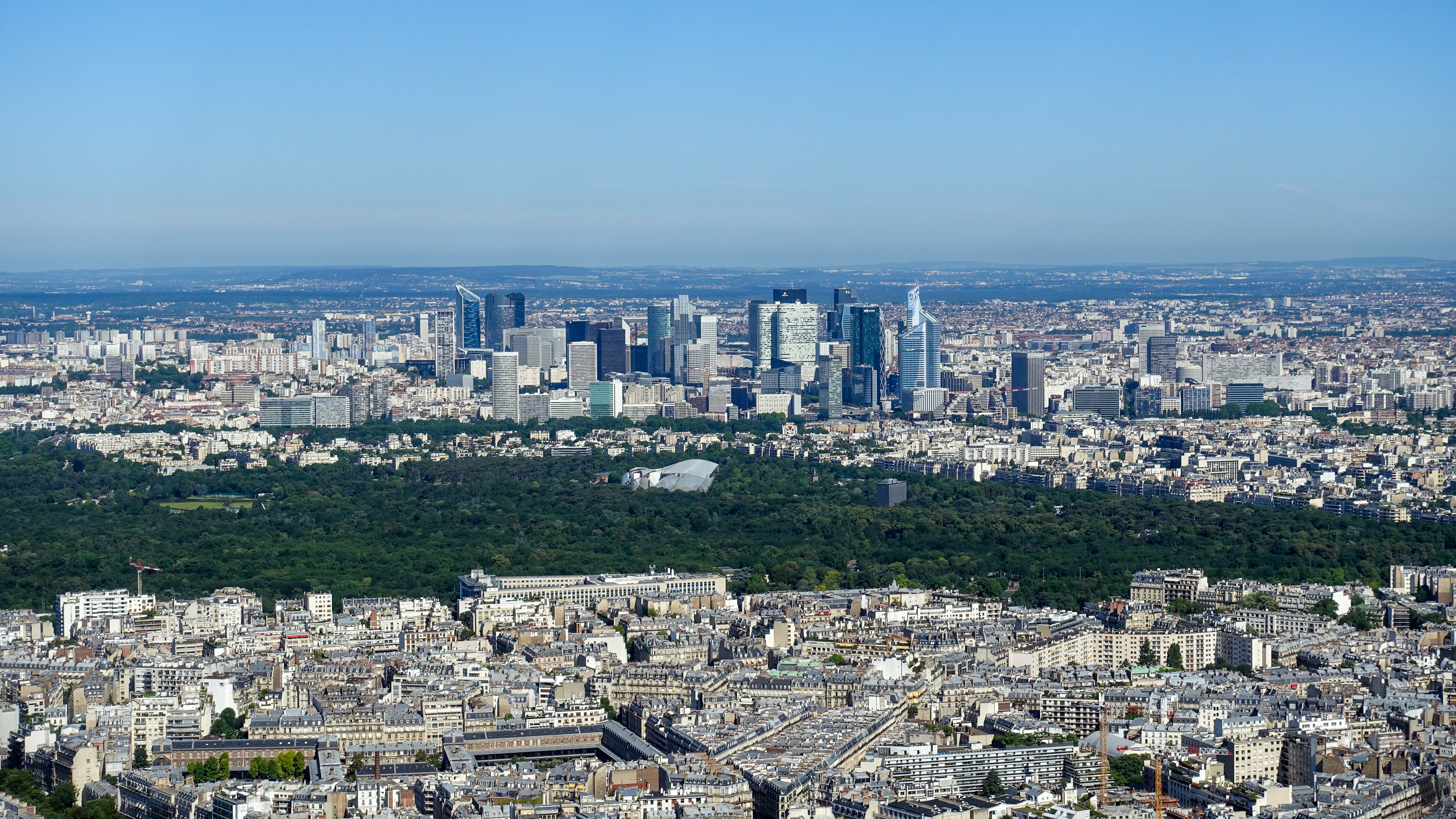
- Host stadium (shown in 2017)
- Venue: Croix-Catelan Stadium
- Dates: 14–22 July 1900
- No. of events: 23 (23 men, 0 women)
- Competitors: 117 from 16 nations

At the 1900 Summer Olympics, twenty-three athletics events were contested. Altogether, 117 athletes from 15 nations competed. A total of 68 medals (23 gold, 23 silver, and 22 bronze) were awarded. The 23 events listed are those currently considered to have been of Olympic stature by the International Olympic Committee and most Olympic historians. They exclude all events that used a handicap system, as well as all events which were open to professional athletes. The IOC has never in any way distinguished between the events at the 1900 Games as having or not having "Olympic stature".

Competitions were held on 14 July, 15 July, 16 July, 19 July, and 22 July. This included Bastille Day, which is a French holiday, and then Sunday, which many of the American athletes protested. Even with many Americans not competing in finals because of confusion caused by the organizers' decision to count scores achieved on Monday, 16 July for finals held on Sunday, 15 July and subsequent rescission of that decision, the United States won more than 4 times as many medals as any other nation, including 16 of the 23 gold medals.

The conditions of competition were also subpar compared even to those at the previous games in 1896. There was no track for the Paris Games, as a grass field dotted with trees and of unequal elevation was used. The course was 500 metres in length, an unusual distance for a track.

== Medal summary ==
Rank	Nation	Gold	Silver	Bronze	Total
1	United States	17	13	11	41
2	Great Britain	4	3	2	9
3	France	1	4	2	7
4	Hungary	1	0	1	2
5	India	0	2	0	2
6	Bohemia	0	1	0	1
7	Australia	0	0	3	3
8	Denmark	0	0	1	1
8	Norway	0	0	1	1
8	Sweden	0	0	1	1
Totals (10 entries)		23	23	22	68

Event	Gold		Silver		Bronze	
60 metres	Alvin Kraenzlein; United States	7.0 =OR	Walter Tewksbury; United States	7.1	Stan Rowley; Australia	7.2
100 metres	Frank Jarvis; United States	11.0	Walter Tewksbury; United States	11.1	Stan Rowley; Australia	11.2
200 metres	Walter Tewksbury; United States	22.2 OR	Norman Pritchard; India	22.8	Stan Rowley; Australia	22.9
400 metres	Maxie Long; United States	49.4 OR	William Holland; United States	49.6	Ernst Schultz; Denmark	51.5
800 metres	Alfred Tysoe; Great Britain	2:01.2	John Cregan; United States	2:03.0	David Hall; United States	2:03.8
1500 metres	Charles Bennett; Great Britain	4:06.2 WR	Henri Deloge; France	4:06.6	John Bray; United States	4:07.2
Marathon	Michel Théato; France (Note: In 2021, the IOC online data and medal table for the 1900 Games were changed to reflect medalists' nationalities in this and eight other events, including for Michel Théato. This led some to believe that Luxembourg had officially recovered this Olympic title. This change in the IOC online data was later reversed.)	2:59:45	Émile Champion; France	3:04:17	Ernst Fast; Sweden	3:37:14
110 metres hurdles	Alvin Kraenzlein; United States	15.4 OR	John McLean; United States	15.5	Frederick Moloney; United States	15.6
200 metres hurdles	Alvin Kraenzlein; United States	25.4	Norman Pritchard; India	26.0	Walter Tewksbury; United States	26.1
400 metres hurdles	Walter Tewksbury; United States	57.6	Henri Tauzin; France	58.3	George Orton; United States	58.8
2500 m steeplechase	George Orton; United States (Note: Canadian George Orton took two medals, a gold and a bronze, but did so while representing the United States.)	7:34.4	Sidney Robinson; Great Britain	7:38.0	Jacques Chastanié; France	7:52.4
4000 m steeplechase	John Rimmer; Great Britain	12:58.4	Charles Bennett; Great Britain	12:58.6	Sidney Robinson; Great Britain	12:58.8
5000 m team race	Great Britain; Charles Bennett (GBR); John Rimmer (GBR); Sidney Robinson (GBR); Alfred Tysoe (GBR); Stan Rowley (AUS)	26 pts	France; Henri Deloge; Jacques Chastanié; André Castanet; Michel Champoudry; Gaston Ragueneau	29 pts	only two teams entered	
High jump	Irving Baxter; United States	1.90 m OR	Patrick Leahy; Great Britain	1.78 m	Lajos Gönczy; Hungary	1.75 m
Pole vault	Irving Baxter; United States	3.30 m =OR	Meredith Colket; United States	3.25 m	Carl Albert Andersen; Norway	3.20 m
Long jump	Alvin Kraenzlein; United States	7.185 m OR	Myer Prinstein; United States	7.175 m	Patrick Leahy; Great Britain	6.950 m
Triple jump	Myer Prinstein; United States	14.47 m OR	James Connolly; United States	13.97 m	Lewis Sheldon; United States	13.64 m
Standing high jump	Ray Ewry; United States	1.655 m	Irving Baxter; United States	1.525 m	Lewis Sheldon; United States	1.500 m
Standing long jump	Ray Ewry; United States	3.30 m	Irving Baxter; United States	3.135 m	Émile Torchebœuf; France	3.03 m
Standing triple jump	Ray Ewry; United States	10.58 m OR	Irving Baxter; United States	9.95 m	Robert Garrett; United States	9.50 m
Shot put	Richard Sheldon; United States	14.10 m OR	Josiah McCracken; United States	12.85 m	Robert Garrett; United States	12.37 m
Discus throw	Rudolf Bauer; Hungary	36.04 m OR	František Janda-Suk; Bohemia	35.14 m	Richard Sheldon; United States	34.60 m
Hammer throw	John Flanagan; United States	51.01 m OR	Truxtun Hare; United States	46.26 m	Josiah McCracken; United States	43.58 m

These medals are retroactively assigned by the International Olympic Committee; at the time, winners were given a variety of prizes, sometimes including silver medals.

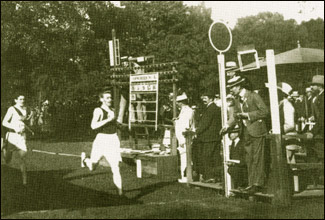
Finish of the 800 m

== Daily summary ==
=== 14 July ===
- All rounds, including the finals, for the 100 metres and the 110 metre hurdles were held. The United States took 5 of the medals, missing only the bronze medal in the 100 metres won by Stan Rowley of Australia. Frank Jarvis won the 100 metres, with Alvin Kraenzlein taking the gold in the 110 metre hurdles.
- In the 400 metre heats, the United States took 5 qualifying spots for the final while Denmark secured the last one. The 800 metres was more balanced, with 3 Americans and one athlete each from France, Great Britain, and Hungary.
- The 400 metre hurdles semifinals eliminated only one athlete, with the other four advancing to the finals.
- Defending discus and shot put champion Robert Garrett failed to make a mark in the qualification round of the discus throw, but did advance to the final in the shot put. Bohemia advanced a thrower in the discus, an event which saw 5 athletes from 5 different nations qualify.
- Surprising few, Kraenzlein and Meyer Prinstein took the top two spots in the long jump qualification, moving to the final along with a third American, a Briton, and a Frenchman.

=== 15 July ===
- In a busy day for the athletics program, 10 finals were held along with the semifinals of the 60 metres (which was one of the events with a final that day). The United States took 7 of the championships, with Great Britain, Canada, and Hungary each picking up one.
- Kraenzlein took the top spots in the 60 metres and the long jump, the latter victory allegedly earning him a punch in the face from Prinstein, who had not competed because the final was held on a Sunday. This brought Kraenzlein's total to 3 gold medals, better than any athlete had done four years earlier. Irving Baxter also took gold in two events, the high jump and the pole vault.
- Denmark won its first athletics medal, with a bronze in the 400 metres. Charles Bennett's gold in the 1500 metres gave Britain its first gold in the sport. Canadian George Orton took two medals, a gold and a bronze, but did so while representing the United States. Hungary won its first gold with the discus throw, adding a bronze in the high jump. Bohemia, another nation making its debut, took the silver medal in the discus.
- The steeplechase made its Olympic debut, with the 2500 metre version won by Orton.

=== 16 July ===
- Eight more finals were held on Monday the 16th. Kraenzlein picked up a fourth victory with the 200 metre hurdles, winning both his semifinal and the final to set a long-lived Olympic record for athletic gold medals in individual events. Ray Ewry won all three of the standing jumps, each of which made its Olympic debut in 1900. Great Britain picked up another pair of gold medals with the 800 metres and the 4000 metre steeplechase. Prinstein got his long-awaited victory in the triple jump, while John Flanagan's hammer throw earned the United States its 6th championship of the day.
- India's debut Games reached a high point with Norman Pritchard's silver medal in the 200 metre hurdles.

=== 19 July ===
- The marathon was the only event held on the 19th. Michel Théato, a Luxembourgish citizen under the French flag, won the gold medal. Sweden earned its first athletics medal with the bronze in the marathon.

=== 22 July ===
- The two remaining events were held on Sunday the 22nd. The semifinals and finals of the 200 metres and the 5000 metre team race were held.
- Pritchard won his second silver medal in the 200 metres, while Rowley won his third bronze in the same event. The race was won by Walter Tewksbury, bringing his total for the Games to five medals, including two gold medals.
- The 5000 metre team race was won by the British team, which included Stan Rowley of Australia. This makes Rowley the only athlete in Olympic history to win gold medals for multiple nations in the same Games; the establishment of National Olympic Committees ensures this accomplishment will remain unique. Also of note is that Rowley did not finish the race: it was far longer than the sprinter was accustomed to running, and after he had been injured and reduced to walking, he retired after everyone else had crossed the finish line to accept last place.

== Participating nations ==
- Australia (1)
- Austria (1)
- Bohemia (4)
- Denmark (4)
- France (23)
- Germany (6)
- Great Britain (9)
- Greece (2)
- Hungary (9)
- India (1)
- Italy (2)
- Norway (2)
- Sweden (8)
- United States (45)

== Non-medal events ==
In 1900, there was no official distinction between Olympic events and other athletic events held during the Games. The athletics programme included a number of events that were restricted to professionals or were conducted as handicap competitions. These events are nowadays by the IOC not classified as Olympic medal events.

These events are:

Games	First	Second	Third
pole vault (special scratch #1)	Bascom Johnson (USA)		
pole vault (special scratch #2)	Daniel Horton (USA)	Charles Dvorak (USA)	
100 metres (handicap)	Edmund Minahan (USA)	Bill Holland (USA)	Norman Pritchard (IND)
400 metres (handicap)	Pál Koppán (HUN)	Albert Werkmüller (GER)	André Lemonnier (FRA)
800 metres (handicap)	Christian Christensen (DEN)	Howard Hayes (USA)	Harvey Lord (USA)
1500 metres (handicap)	Franz Duhne (GER)	Christian Christensen (DEN)	Délivre (FRA)
110 metres hurdles (handicap)	Gustav Adolf Rau (GER)	Norman Pritchard (IND)	Adolphe Klingelhoefer (FRA)
400 metres hurdles (handicap)	Norman Pritchard (IND)	Walter Tewksbury (USA)	William Lewis (USA)
2500 metres steeplechase (handicap)	Hermann Wraschtil (AUT)	Franz Duhne (GER)	Edward Bushnell (USA)
high jump (handicap)	Tore Blom (SWE)	Gyula Strausz (HUN)	Waldemar Steffen (GER)
long jump (handicap)	Pál Koppán (HUN)	John McLean (USA)	Thaddeus McClain (USA)
pole vault (handicap)	Jakab Kauser (HUN)	Eric Lemming (SWE)	Meredith Colket (USA)
shot put (handicap)	Rezső Crettier (HUN)	Roger Basset (FRA)	Guillaume de Saint-Cyr (FRA)
discus throw (handicap)	Gustaf Söderström (SWE)	Gyula Strausz (HUN)	Karl Gustaf Staaf (SWE)
100 metres (professionals)	Edgar Bredin (GBR)	Jules Bouchoux (FRA)	Barriol (FRA)
400 metres (professionals)	Edgar Bredin (GBR)	Victor Legrain (FRA)	Jules Bouchoux (FRA)
1500 metres (professionals)	Edgar Bredin (GBR)	Claude Bouchoux (FRA)	Eugène Neveu (FRA)
5000 metres (professionals)	Albert Charbonnel (FRA)	Emile Laurent (FRA)	Charles Aubry (FRA)
6-hour race (professionals)	Victor Bagré (FRA)	Albert Charbonnel (FRA)	Albert Chauvelot (FRA)
110 metres hurdles (professionals)	Jules Treyens (FRA)	Pierre Charbonnel (BEL)	
2500 metres steeplechase (professionals)	Eugène Neveu (FRA)	Eugène Pican (FRA)	Claude Bouchoux (FRA)
high jump (professionals)	Mike Sweeney (USA)	Otto Schoenfeld (USA)	Noël Douet (FRA)
long jump (professionals)	Mike Sweeney (USA)	Otto Schoenfeld (USA)	Jules Bouchoux (FRA)
shot put (professionals)	Otto Schoenfeld (USA)	Noël Douet (FRA)	
100 metres (professionals / handicap)	Moncet (FRA)	Albert Hannais (FRA)	Pradeau (FRA)
400 metres (professionals / handicap)	Triolet (FRA)	Albert Hannais (FRA)	Lieuvain (FRA)
1500 metres (professionals / handicap)	Forget (FRA)	Jules Treyens (FRA)	Octave Joannet (FRA)
high jump (professionals / handicap)	Noël Douet (FRA)	Otto Schoenfeld (USA)	Mike Sweeney (USA)
long jump (professionals / handicap)	Jules Treyens (FRA)	Mike Sweeney (USA)	Otto Schoenfeld (USA)
shot put (professionals / handicap)	Noël Douet (FRA)	Caillet (FRA)	Otto Schoenfeld (USA)
