= Albert Champoudry =

French middle-distance runner

Olympic medal record

Men's athletics

Representing France
Silver medal – second place	1900 Paris	5000 metres team race

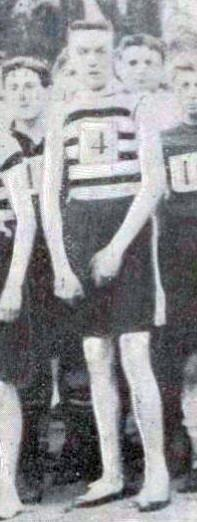

Albert Alphonse Champoudry (8 May 1880 in Paris – 23 June 1933 in Paris) was an early twentieth century French middle-distance runner. He participated in Athletics at the 1900 Summer Olympics in Paris and won the silver medal in the 5000 metres team race for the French team with Jacques Chastanie, Henri Deloge, Gaston Ragueneau, and André Castanet.
