= Athletics at the 1900 Summer Olympics – Men's 1500 metres =

Men's 1500 metres at the Games of the II Olympiad
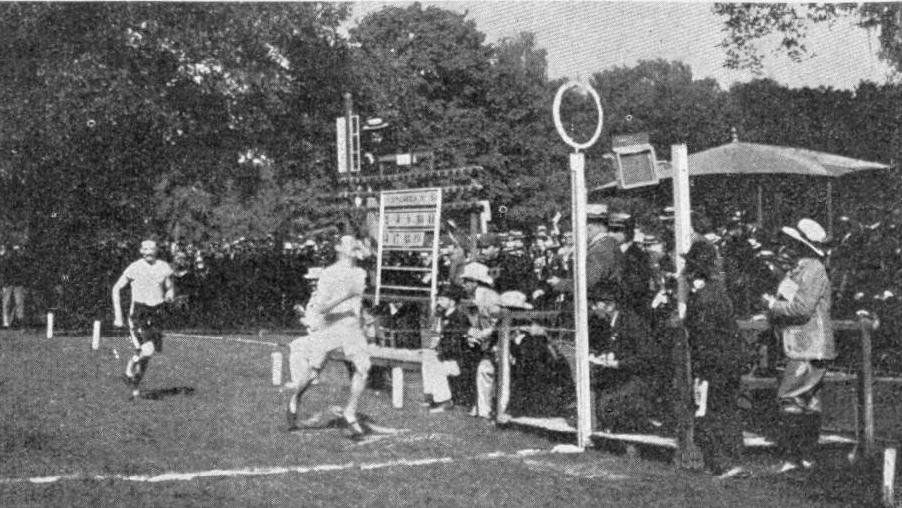
- Finish of the race
- Venue: Bois de Boulogne
- Date: July 15, 1900
- Competitors: 9 from 6 nations
- Winning time: 4:06.2 WR

Medalists
1st place, gold medalist(s)		Charles Bennett; Great Britain
2nd place, silver medalist(s)		Henri Deloge; France
3rd place, bronze medalist(s)		John Bray; United States

The men's 1500 metres was a middle-distance running event on the athletics programme at the 1900 Summer Olympics in Paris. It was held on July 15, 1900. The race was held on a track of 500 metres in circumference. Nine athletes from six nations competed. The event was won by Charles Bennett of Great Britain, the nation's first medal in the brief history of the event.

== Background ==
This was the second appearance of the event, which is one of 12 athletics events to have been held at every Summer Olympics. None of the runners from 1896 returned. John Bray of the United States was the unofficial world record holder, but the field was otherwise undistinguished. John Cregan, Alexander Grant, and George Orton were among the top runners at the distance and competed in the 1900 Games in other events, but did not run the 1500 metres (possibly due to the event being held on a Sunday.)

Austria, Bohemia, Denmark, and Great Britain made their first appearance in the event. France and the United States were the only two countries to have previously competed in 1896 and return in 1900.

== Competition format ==
The competition consisted of a single round, with one three-lap race around the 500-metre stadium.

== Records ==
These were the standing world and Olympic records (in minutes) prior to the 1900 Summer Olympics.

World record	John Bray (USA)	4:09.0 (u)	Bayonne, France	30 May 1900
Olympic record	Edwin Flack (AUS)	4:33.2	Athens, Greece	7 April 1896

Charles Bennett set a new Olympic record and a new unofficial world record at 4:06.2.

== Schedule ==
Date	Time	Round
Sunday, 15 July 1900	15:30	Final

== Results ==
Bennett, who had led the entire distance by a small margin over Deloge, broke off in the final lap, and ran last 500 metres in a time of 1:10.2 to set an unofficial world record, finishing five yards ahead of Deloge. John Bray edged out David Hall by two yards.

Rank	Athlete	Nation	Time	Notes
1st place, gold medalist(s)	Charles Bennett	Great Britain	4:06.2	WR
2nd place, silver medalist(s)	Henri Deloge	France	4:06.6	
3rd place, bronze medalist(s)	John Bray	United States	4:07.2	
4	David Hall	United States	4:07.5	
5	Christian Christensen	Denmark	Unknown	
6	Hermann Wraschtil	Austria	Unknown	
7–9	Ondřej Pukl	Bohemia	Unknown	
7–9	John Rimmer	Great Britain	Unknown	
7–9	Louis Segondi	France	Unknown	

== Sources ==
- International Olympic Committee.
- De Wael, Herman. Herman's Full Olympians: "Athletics 1900". Accessed 18 March 2006. Available electronically at.
- Mallon, Bill (1998). The 1900 Olympic Games, Results for All Competitors in All Events, with Commentary. Jefferson, North Carolina: McFarland & Company, Inc., Publishers. ISBN 0-7864-0378-0.
