= Athletics at the 1900 Summer Olympics – Men's marathon =

Men's marathon at the Games of the II Olympiad
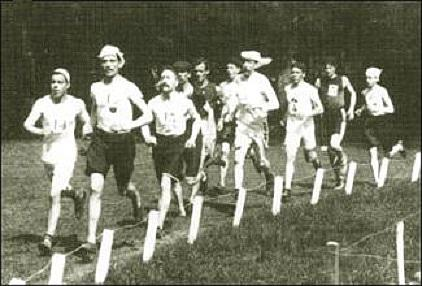
- The early stages of the race
- Venue: Paris
- Date: July 19, 1900
- Competitors: 14 from 5 nations
- Winning time: 2:59:45

Medalists
1st place, gold medalist(s)		Michel Théato; France
2nd place, silver medalist(s)		Émile Champion; France
3rd place, bronze medalist(s)		Ernst Fast; Sweden

The men's marathon was a track & field athletics event at the 1900 Summer Olympics in Paris. It was held on July 19, 1900. 13 athletes from five nations competed in the marathon, which used a distance of 40.26 kilometres.

The winner, Michel Théato, was a native of Luxembourg who was living in Paris. At the time, competitors were not selected and entered by National Olympic Committees. As such, Théato was recorded as being French. Decades later, after his true nationality was determined, the Grand Duchy of Luxembourg lodged a complaint with the International Olympic Committee and petitioned to change the Olympic record of Théato's nationality; this complaint was rejected in 2004.

In 2021, the IOC online data and medal table for the 1900 Games were changed to reflect medalists' nationalities in this and eight other events, including for Michel Théato. This led some to believe that Luxembourg had officially recovered this Olympic title. This change in the IOC online data was later reversed.

== Summary ==
The marathon race, which began at 2:30 p.m. in temperatures of 39 °C (102 °F), wound through the streets of Paris.

While 20 runners entered, only thirteen started, with seven finishing the race: one dropped out during the four laps around the track that preceded the road running. Touquet-Daunis led until he was overcome by the heat, and subsequently retired from the race.

Fast took the lead, but had tired himself trying to keep pace with the Frenchman, and was passed by Théato and Champion before the end.

== Background ==
This was the second appearance of the event, which is one of 12 athletics events to have been held at every Summer Olympics. None of the runners from 1896 returned. The marathon, invented specifically for the 1896 Olympics, was not quite as much a novelty as four years prior; the Boston Marathon had been run every year starting in 1897, and the 1898 winner, Ronald MacDonald of Canada, was among the runners at the 1900 Olympics.

Canada, Great Britain, and Sweden appeared in the event for the first time. France and the United States were the only nations to have runners in both of the first two Olympic marathons.

== Competition format ==
The marathon was a single-race competition. The distance for the event had not yet been standardized; the 1900 version used a course that was 40.26 kilometres in length (compared to the approximately 40 kilometres of 1896 and the 42.195 kilometres later set as the standard). The course started with four laps of the track in the stadium (2 kilometers), before running through the streets of Paris.

== Records ==
These were the standing world and Olympic records (in hours) prior to the 1900 Summer Olympics. Marathon distances were not standardized, and world records or bests were not officially recognized, until 1924.

World record	Jack Caffery (CAN)	2:39:44 (40.23km)	Boston	19 April 1900
Olympic record	Spyridon Louis (GRE)	2'58:50(*)	Athens, Greece	10 April 1896 (NS)

(*) Distance was 40 kilometres

== Schedule ==
Date	Time	Round
Thursday, 19 July 1900	14:30	Final

== Results ==
Rank	Athlete	Nation	Time
1st place, gold medalist(s)	Michel Théato	France	2:59:45
2nd place, silver medalist(s)	Émile Champion	France	3:04:17
3rd place, bronze medalist(s)	Ernst Fast	Sweden	3:37:14
4	Eugène Besse	France	4:00:43
5	Arthur Newton	United States	4:04:12
6	Dick Grant	United States	Unknown
7	Ronald J. MacDonald	Canada	Unknown
—	Auguste Marchais	France	DNF
—	Johan Nyström	Sweden	DNF
—	Ernest Ion Pool	Great Britain	DNF
—	Frederick Randall	Great Britain	DNF
—	William Saward	Great Britain	DNF
—	William Taylor	Great Britain	DNF
—	Georges Touquet-Daunis	France	DNF
—	Emilio Banfi	Italy	DNS
—	John Cregan	United States	DNS
—	Alexander Grant	Canada	DNS
—	John Maguire	Great Britain	DNS
—	Martens	France	DNS
—	Jakub Wolf	Hungary	DNS
—	Ettore Zilia	Italy	DNS

== Sources ==
Specific

General

- International Olympic Committee results database
- De Wael, Herman. Herman's Full Olympians: "Athletics 1900". Accessed 18 March 2006. Available electronically at.
- Mallon, Bill (1998). The 1900 Olympic Games, Results for All Competitors in All Events, with Commentary. Jefferson, North Carolina: McFarland & Company, Inc., Publishers. ISBN 0-7864-0378-0.
