= Paul Castanet =

French middle-distance runner

Olympic medal record

Men's athletics

Representing France
Silver medal – second place	1900 Paris	5000 metres team race

Paul Remy Castanet (16 March 1880 in Clamart – 8 December 1967 in Malakoff) was an early twentieth century French middle-distance runner. He participated in Athletics at the 1900 Summer Olympics in Paris and won the silver medal in the 5000 metres team race for the French team with Jacques Chastanie, Henri Deloge and Gaston Ragueneau.
