= Ernst Schultz =

Danish sprinter

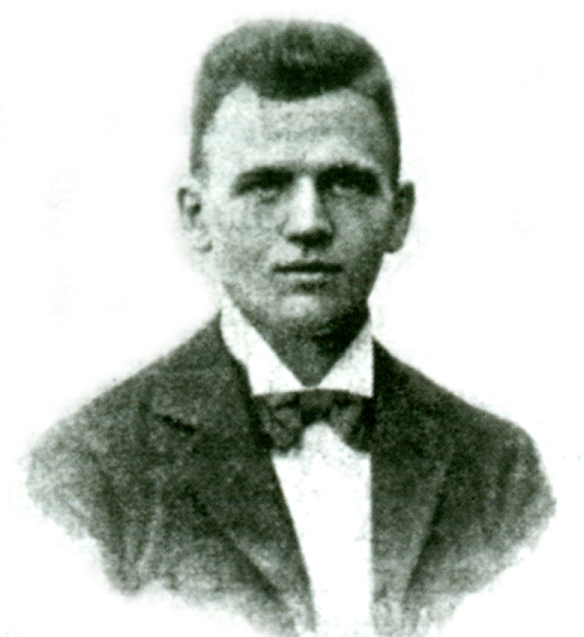

Personal information
- Born: 15 May 1879 Horsens, Denmark
- Died: 20 June 1906 (aged 27) Roskilde Fjord, Denmark

Sport
- Sport: Athletics
- Event: 400 m
- Club: Københavns IF; Hellerup IK

Achievements and titles
- Personal bests: 200 m – 24.0 (1899); 400 m – 51.5 (1900)
Medal record
Representing Denmark
Olympic Games
Bronze medal – third place	1900 Paris	400 m

Ernst Ludvig Emanuel Schultz (15 May 1879 – 20 June 1906) was a Danish sprinter who won a bronze medal in the 400 m event at the 1900 Summer Olympics.

In the 1898–99 athletics season, Schultz had set Danish records in the 200 metres and quarter-mile distances and in 1899 he won the 150 metre national title when running for the Københavns IF club. The following year, just after his 21st birthday, he traveled to Paris, France to participate in the 1900 Summer Olympics, Schultz was the youngest of the 13 man team from Denmark. He competed in one event the 400 metres, in the first round, although his time is unknown, he finished in second place behind American William Moloney, so qualified for the final the next day. Schultz and five Americans had qualified for the final, but the final was run on a Sunday, and due to religious reason three Americans refused to run, so running a time of 51.5 seconds Schultz came last of the three finalist and won the bronze medal behind Maxie Long and Bill Holland. Later in the year with two other young men they founded Hellerup IK, which Schultz was chairman for the first year.

Besides athletics Schultz also competed in rowing and association football, then on 20 June 1906, just one month and five days after his 27th birthday he drowned while trying to rescue his rowing partner 20 year old footballer Thorald Petersen Høyen when their boat capsized in the Roskilde Fjord.
