= 1894 AAA Championships =

Outdoor track and field competition

- Dates: 7 July 1894
- Host city: Huddersfield, England
- Venue: Fartown Ground
- Level: Senior
- Type: Outdoor
- Events: 14

The 1894 AAA Championships was an outdoor track and field competition organised by the Amateur Athletic Association (AAA), held on Saturday 7 July 1894 at the Fartown Ground in Huddersfield, England, in front of 6,200 spectators.

The 14 events were the same number as in the previous year, although the 7 miles walk was reduced to a new distance of 4 miles.

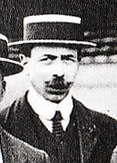
Fred Bacon

== Results ==
Event	Gold		Silver		Bronze	
100 yards	Charles Bradley	10.2	Max Wittenberg	3½ yd	Charles Thomas	1½ yd
440 yards	(Gibraltar) Edgar Bredin	50.0	Arthur Ovenden	51.6	H.S. Johnson	2 yd
880 yards	(Gibraltar) Edgar Bredin	1:56.8	Frederick Horan	1:58.4	Anthony Millett	2:01.8
1 mile	Fred Bacon	4:25.8	William Fowler	4:29.6	William Lutyens	8 yd
4 miles	Fred Bacon	19:48.8	George Crossland	19:49.2	Sidney Thomas	20:09.4
10 miles	Sidney Thomas	51:37.0	Harry Watkins	51:40.0	H.J.W. Roberts	54:40.8
steeplechase	Alfred George	11:21.0	George Martin	11:51.4	only 2 competitors	
120yd hurdles	Godfrey Shaw	16.6	Percy Lowe	3 yd	(Leinster) Tom Donovan	4 yd
4 miles walk	Harry Curtis	30:05.8	David Fenton	30:26.2	William Sturgess	30:38.8
high jump	Reginald Williams	1.759	Eric Swanwick	1.734	only 2 competitors	
pole jump	Robert Dickinson	3.32	E. Wilson	2.59	only 2 competitors	
long jump	(Leinster) Tom Donovan	6.30	Arthur Badger	6.20	B.C. Green	6.01
shot put	(Leinster) Denis Horgan	12.90	(Scotland) James D. McIntosh	12.33	(Leinster) William Barry	12.11
hammer throw	(Leinster) William Barry	38.62	(Scotland) R. Nelson Robbie	34.68	(Leinster) Denis Carey	32.22
