= Ernst Fast =

Swedish long-distance runner

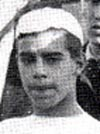

Medal record

Men's athletics

Olympic Games
Bronze medal – third place	1900 Paris	Marathon

Ernst Robert Efraim Fast (21 January 1881 in Stockholm – 26 October 1959 in Sigtuna) was a Swedish long distance runner who competed in the late 19th century and early 20th century. He specialized in the marathon and participated in the event in Athletics at the 1900 Summer Olympics in Paris and won the bronze medal, behind second place Émile Champion.
