= Johan Nyström =

Johan Nyström may refer to:

- Johan Nyström (athlete) (1874–1968), Swedish Olympic track and field athlete
- Johan Nyström (swimmer) (born 1975), Swedish swimmer
- John W. Nystrom, born Johan Vilhelm Nyström (1825–1885), American civil engineer, inventor and author
