= Scrafford =

Scrafford is a surname. Notable people with the surname include:

- Justus Scrafford (1878–1947), American track and field athlete
- Kirk Scrafford (born 1967), American football player
