= Jules Bouchoux =

French sprinter and long jumper (1869–1925)

Personal information
- Full name: Jules Lazare Bouchoux
- Nationality: France
- Born: 4 December 1869 Arleuf, France
- Died: 6 December 1925 (aged 56) Paris (16th arrondissement), France
- Height: 169 cm (5 ft 7 in)

Sport
- Club: Union des Sports (Paris)
Medal record
Men's athletics
Representing France
Summer Olympics
Second place	1900 Paris	100 metres (professionals)
Third place	1900 Paris	400 metres (professionals)
Third place	1900 Paris	Long jump (professionals)
Representing Union des Sports
French Athletics Championships
Gold medal – first place	1898 Paris	100 metres (professionals)
Gold medal – first place	1898 Paris	Long jump (professionals)
Silver medal – second place	1898 Paris	400 metres (professionals)

Jules Lazare Bouchoux also written as Jules Lazare Bouffechoux (4 December 1869 – 6 December 1925) was a French sprinter and long jumper. He was a member of Union des Sports in Paris.

== Biography ==
=== Personal life ===
Bouchoux was born on 4 December 1869 in Arleuf. Five years later Claude Bouchoux (1874-1942) was born in Arleuf who also became a professional athletics competitor.

=== Career ===
Bouchoux competed for Union des Sports in Paris. At the 1898 French national professional championships in Paris, be wont national titles in both the 100 metres, with a time of 12.4 seconds, and the long jump, with a mark of 5,48 metres. He also finished runner-up to L. Janvier in the 400 metres.

He represented the French team at the 1900 Summer Olympics in a total of five professional events. He finished second in the 100 metres, losing by 4 metres to winner Edgar Bredin of Great Britain, he finished finished third in the 400 metres and also third in the long jump event. Before July 2021 the IOC has never decided which events were official Olympic events and which were not. Nowadays, these events are not recognized by the International Olympic Committee as official Olympic medal competitions, as only amateur events are counted as official events.
