= Men's 400 metres world record progression =

The first world record in the 400 m for men (athletics) was recognized by the International Amateur Athletics Federation, now known as World Athletics, in 1912. The IAAF ratified Charles Reidpath's 48.2 s performance set at that year's Stockholm Olympics as a world record, but it also recognized the superior mark over 440 yards (402.336 metres) run by Maxie Long in 1900 as a world record.

Up to and including 2021, World Athletics has ratified 24 outdoor world records in the event.

The following tables show the world record progression in the men's 400 metres, as ratified by World Athletics.

Ratified
Not ratified
Ratified but later rescinded
Pending ratification

== Indoor ==
Indoor records are run on a shorter 200 metres track. "y" indicates marks were set over the 440 yards (402.34 m) imperial distance, and an asterisk indicates a record was repeated. All records since Schönlebe's 45.41 in 1986 were ratified by the IAAF.

Men's indoor 400 metres world record progression
Time	Athlete	Nationality	Location of race	Date
Manual timing
50.8y	Harry Hillman	United States	New York	1907
50.4y	James Rosenberger	United States	New York	17 February 1911
49.6y	Thomas Halpin	United States	Buffalo	15 March 1913
49.6y	Walter Koppisch	United States	Buffalo	17 March 1923
48.9y	Bill Henke	United States	Iowa City	28 February 1931
48.9y*	Ray Ellinwood	United States	Chicago	14 March 1936
48.2y	Roy Cochran	United States	Chicago	9 March 1940
48.1y	Bob Ufer	United States	Chicago	7 March 1942
47.9	Roy Cochran	United States	New York	25 March 1942
47.9y	Herbert McKenley	Jamaica	Chicago	15 March 1947
47.9y*	Dave Mills	United States	Bloomington	3 February 1962
47.9y*	Elzie Higginbottom	United States	Madison	10 February 1962
47.9y*	Elzie Higginbottom	United States	Minneapolis	17 February 1962
47.9y*	Elzie Higginbottom	United States	Madison	24 February 1962
47.8y	Dave Mills	United States	East Lansing	3 March 1962
47.8y*	Jean-Pierre Boccardo	France	Stuttgart	14 February 1964
47.6y	Ray Saddler	United States	Louisville	27 February 1965
46.8	Mike Larrabee	United States	Berlin	8 April 1965
46.2y	Tommie Smith	United States	Louisville	18 February 1967
46.1	Marcello Fiasconaro	Italy	Genova	15 March 1972
45.9	Alfons Brijdenbach	Belgium	Sofia	17 February 1974
45.9*	Mikhail Linge	Soviet Union	Moscow	16 February 1980
Automatic timing
47.55	Jan Balachowski	Poland	Madrid	10 March 1968
47.09	Andrzej Badenski	Poland	Madrid	10 March 1968
46.38	Luciano Susanj	Yugoslavia	Rotterdam	11 March 1973
46.21	Karel Kolar	Czechoslovakia	Wien	25 February 1979
45.96	Hartmut Weber	West Germany	Sindelfingen	7 February 1981
45.79	Antonio McKay	United States	Gainesville	11 February 1984
45.60	Thomas Schönlebe	East Germany	Paris-Bercy	19 January 1985
45.56	Todd Bennett	Great Britain	Piraeus	3 March 1985
45.41	Thomas Schönlebe	East Germany	Wien	9 February 1986
45.05	Thomas Schönlebe	East Germany	Sindelfingen	5 February 1988
45.05	Danny Everett	United States	Stuttgart	4 February 1990
45.02	Danny Everett	United States	Stuttgart	2 February 1992
44.97	Michael Johnson	United States	Reno	10 February 1995
44.63	Michael Johnson	United States	Atlanta	4 March 1995
44.57	Kerron Clement	United States	Fayetteville, AR	12 March 2005
44.52	Michael Norman	United States	College Station	10 March 2018
44.52	Khaleb McRae	United States	Fayetteville, AR	13 February 2026

== Outdoor ==
=== Records 1895–1976 ===
Time	Auto	Athlete	Nationality	Location of race	Date
48.5y		Edgar Bredin	United Kingdom	London, UK	June 1895
47.8y		Maxie Long	United States	New York, USA	29 September 1900
48.2		Charles Reidpath	United States	Stockholm, Sweden	13 July 1912
47.4y		Ted Meredith	United States	Cambridge, USA	27 May 1916
47.6		Eric Liddell	United Kingdom	Paris, France	11 July 1924 (Note: Eric Liddell's 1924 Olympic Games victory was initially ratified as a world record by the IAAF, despite being slower than Ted Meredith's mark from 1916. The IAAF rescinded the record on August 7, 1928.)
47.0		Emerson Spencer	United States	Palo Alto, USA	12 May 1928
46.4y		Ben Eastman	United States	Palo Alto, California, USA	26 March 1932
46.2	46.28	Bill Carr	United States	Los Angeles, USA	5 August 1932
46.1		Archie Williams	United States	Chicago, USA	19 June 1936
46.0		Rudolf Harbig	Germany	Frankfurt am Main, Germany	12 August 1939
46.0		Grover Klemmer	United States	Philadelphia, USA	6 June 1941
46.0y		Herb McKenley	Jamaica	Berkeley, USA	5 June 1948
45.9	46.00	Herb McKenley	Jamaica	Milwaukee, USA	2 July 1948
45.8		George Rhoden	Jamaica	Eskilstuna, Sweden	22 August 1950
45.4 A	45.68	Lou Jones	United States	Mexico City, Mexico	18 March 1955
45.2		Lou Jones	United States	Los Angeles, USA	30 June 1956
44.9	45.07	Otis Davis	United States	Rome, Italy	6 September 1960
44.9	45.08	Carl Kaufmann	Germany	Rome, Italy	6 September 1960
44.9y		Adolph Plummer	United States	Tempe, USA	25 May 1963
44.9		Mike Larrabee	United States	Los Angeles, USA	12 September 1964
44.5+		Tommie Smith	United States	San Jose, USA	20 May 1967
44.1 A	44.19	Larry James	United States	Echo Summit, USA	14 September 1968
43.8 A	43.86	Lee Evans	United States	Mexico City, Mexico	18 October 1968

(+) plus sign denotes en route time during longer race
"y" denotes time for 440 yards, ratified as a record for this event
"A" indicates that the time was set at altitude.

The "Time" column indicates the ratified mark; the "Auto" column indicates a fully automatic time that was also recorded in the event when hand-timed marks were used for official records, or which was the basis for the official mark, rounded to the 10th of a second, depending on the rules then in place.

=== Records post-1976 ===
From 1975, the IAAF accepted separate automatically electronically timed records for events up to 400 metres. Starting January 1, 1977, the IAAF required fully automatic timing to the hundredth of a second for these events.

Lee Evans' 1968 Olympic gold medal victory time of 43.86 was the fastest recorded result to that time.

Time	Athlete	Nationality	Location of race	Date	Duration of record
43.86 A	Lee Evans	United States	Mexico City, Mexico	18 October 1968	19 years, 9 months and 30 days
43.29	Butch Reynolds	United States	Zürich, Switzerland	17 August 1988	11 years and 9 days
43.18	Michael Johnson	United States	Seville, Spain	26 August 1999	16 years, 11 months and 19 days
43.03	Wayde van Niekerk	South Africa	Rio de Janeiro, Brazil	14 August 2016	10 years, 1 month and 24 days

For the period when the record automatic time was Lee Evans' mark of 43.86, the progression excluding races run at high altitude (above 1,000 metres) was as follows:

Time	Athlete	Nationality	Location of race	Date	Duration of record
44.95	Lee Evans	United States	Winnipeg, Canada	30 July 1967	4 years and 2 days
44.60	John Smith	United States	Cali, Colombia	1 August 1971	4 years, 11 months and 28 days
44.26	Alberto Juantorena	Cuba	Montreal, Canada	29 July 1976	10 years, 9 months and 4 days
44.10	Butch Reynolds	United States	Columbus, Ohio, USA	3 May 1987	1 year, 2 months and 17 days
43.93	Butch Reynolds	United States	Indianapolis, USA	20 July 1988	28 days
