= John Cregan =

John Cregan may refer to:

- John Cregan (politician), Irish Fianna Fáil politician
- John Cregan (athlete), athlete at the 1900 Olympics
- John Cregan (filmmaker), film director, writer, editor, and producer, director of Lord of the Flies
