= 1895 AAA Championships =

Outdoor track and field competition

- Dates: 6 July 1895
- Host city: London, England
- Venue: Stamford Bridge (stadium)
- Level: Senior
- Type: Outdoor
- Events: 14

The 1895 AAA Championships was an outdoor track and field competition organised by the Amateur Athletic Association (AAA), held on Saturday 6 July 1895 at the Stamford Bridge (stadium) in London, England.

The total number of events remained unchanged from the previous year, with all fourteen disciplines retained without alteration.

Fred Bacon set a new world record in the 1 mile event.

== Results ==
| Event | Gold | | Silver | | Bronze | |
|---|---|---|---|---|---|---|
| 100 yards | Charles Bradley | 10.0 =NR | Alfred Downer | 1½ yd | Max Wittenberg | 1 yd |
| 440 yards | William Fitzherbert | 49.6 | (Gibraltar) Edgar Bredin | 2 ft | (Cape Colony) Philip Blignaut | 4-6 yd |
| 880 yards | (Gibraltar) Edgar Bredin | 1:55.8 | Frederick Horan | 3 yd | Arthur Butler | 1:57.4 |
| 1 mile | Fred Bacon | 4:17.0 WR | William Lutyens | 4:21.0 | Charles Montague | 10-12 yd |
| 4 miles | Henry Munro | 19:49.4 | Charles Pearce | 20:02.0 | Sidney Thomas | 20:06.8 |
| 10 miles | Fred Bacon | 52:43.8 | Harry Watkins | 52:45.4 | Charles Willers | 55:28.4 |
| steeplechase | Edwin Wilkins | 11:24.0 | C. S. Sydenham | 20 yd | C. W. Davies | |
| 120yd hurdles | Godfrey Shaw | 15.8 NR | William Oakley | 2½ yd | Percy Lowe | 1½ yd |
| 4 miles walk | William Sturgess | 30:17.4 | M. K. Forrester | 200 yd | W. Cryer | |
| high jump | (Leinster) James Ryan | 1.816 | Reginald Williams | 1.791 | Robert Perry | 1.765 |
| pole jump | Robert Dickinson | 3.05 | P. Hunter (South Africa) | 2.74 | only 2 competitors | |
| long jump | William Oakley | 6.56 | (New Zealand) Wally Mendelson | 6.48 | Claude Leggatt | 6.31 |
| shot put | (Leinster) Denis Horgan | 13.50 | Dudley Gradwell (South Africa) | 13.13 | (Leinster) William Barry | 13.00 |
| hammer throw | (Leinster) William Barry | 40.53 | (Leinster) Tom Kiely | 39.69 | (Scotland) James MacDonald | 30.56 |
