= Umberto Colombo =

Umberto Colombo may refer to:

- Umberto Colombo (athlete) (born 1880), Italian runner who competed in the 1900 Summer Olympics
- Umberto Colombo (footballer) (1933–2021), Italian international footballer
- Umberto Colombo (scientist) (1927–2006), Italian scientist and politician
