= Charles Aubry =

Charles Aubry may refer to:

- Charles Aubry (athlete), French professional long distance runner
- Charles Aubry (jurist), French jurist
- Charles Philippe Aubry, French soldier and colonial administrator
