= Fred Bacon =

British athlete

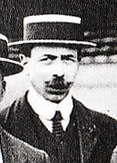
- Bacon in 1911

Personal information
- Born: 21 November 1870 Boxted, Essex, England
- Died: 21 February 1954 (aged 83) Cleethorpes, England

Sport
- Sport: Athletics
- Event: 1 mile
- Club: Ashton Harriers

Frederick Ernest Bacon (21 November 1870 – 21 February 1954) was a British runner who won numerous running titles and briefly held the amateur world record for the mile.

== Biography ==
Bacon, born in Boxted, Essex, competed for Ashton-under-Lyne Harriers whilst stationed there as a soldier.

Bacon became the British 1 mile champion after winning the AAA Championships title at the 1893 AAA Championships. He then successfully defended his title at both the 1894 AAA Championships and the 1895 AAA Championships. His 1895 winning time was a world amateur record of 4:17. The record was short-lived, being eclipsed by Irish/American runner Thomas Conneff the following month.

He additionally won the AAA British 4 mile title in 1894. the 10-mile (16 km) and 10 miles title in 1895. and set a world record in the One-Hour run.

After his running career ended, Bacon went on to become the trainer for Manchester United F.C. until 1912, leaving under a cloud and left his family. There is little information about what Bacon did after leaving Manchester United.

In 1914 he joined up and was based on the Humber defences at Cleethorpes, where he remained until his death in 1954.

== Achievements ==
- 1891 first mention for Ashton-under-Lyne Harriers
- 1893 Northern Cross Country Champion
- 1894 running for Essex but usually Ashton-under-Lyne Harriers
- 1894 AAA four mile (6 km) title 19.48.8
- 1893 World mile record holder time 4.22.2
- 1894 world mile record holder time 4.18.2
- 1895 world mile record holder time 4.17.0
- 1895 AAA ten miles (16 km) champion 52:43.8; became professional
- 1896 Won ¾ mile race in 3.02.4 proving sub 4 min mile was possible
- 1896 invited to New York
- 1896 beat Conneff
- 1897 world 1 hour record Rochdale 11 miles 1243 yards 30,000 crowd (beat Deerfoot's 34 year record).
