= Louis Segondi =

French middle-distance runner

Louis Segondi (30 November 1879 in Paris – 23 June 1949 in Paris) was a French track and field athlete who competed at the 1900 Summer Olympics in Paris, France. Segondi competed in the 1500 metres. He placed in the bottom third of the nine-man, single-round event.
