= Maurice Salomez =

French athlete

Maurice Salomez (10 April 1880 in Paris – 7 August 1916 in Ville-sur-Cousances) was a French track and field athlete who competed at the 1900 Summer Olympics in Paris, France. Salomez competed in the 800 metres. He placed fourth in his first-round (semifinals) heat and did not advance to the final.

He was killed in action during World War I.

== See also ==
- List of Olympians killed in World War I
