= Ondřej Pukl =

Czech runner (1876–1936)

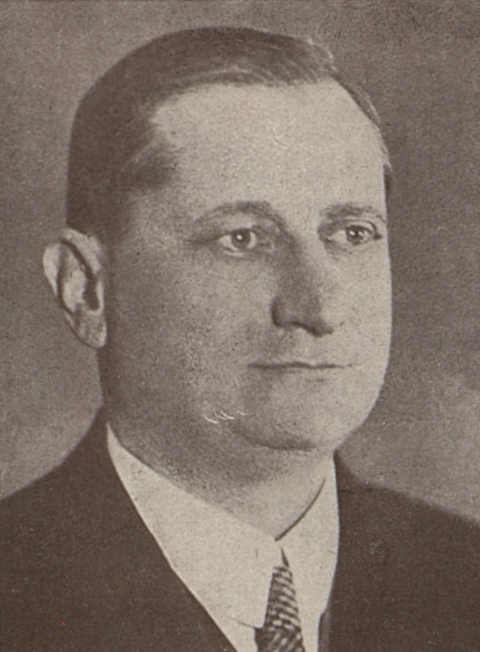
Ondřej Pukl

Ondřej Pukl (28 May 1876 in Křeničná – 9 February 1936 in Prague) was a Czech track and field athlete who competed for Bohemia at the 1900 Summer Olympics in Paris, France.

Pukl competed in the 800 metres. He placed fourth or fifth in his first-round (semifinals) heat and did not advance to the final.

In the 1500 metres, Pukl finished somewhere in the bottom third of the nine-man, single-round race.
