= Emilio Banfi =

Italian middle-distance runner

Personal information
- Nationality: Italian
- Born: 1881 Saronno, Kingdom of Italy
- Died: Unknown

Sport
- Country: Italy
- Sport: Athletics
- Event: 800 metres

Emilio Banfi (born 1881, date of death unknown) was an Italian track and field athlete who competed at the 1900 Summer Olympics in Paris, France.

== Biography ==
Banfi competed in the 800 metres. He placed somewhere between fourth and sixth in his first-round (semifinals) heat, and did not advance to the final.

At the 1900 Summer Olympics in Paris, Banfi held a valuable correspondence with La Gazzetta dello Sport.

== Achievements ==
Year	Competition	Venue	Position	Event	Performance	Note
1900	Olympic Games	(France) Paris	heat	800 metres	-	

== Bibliography ==
- De Wael, Herman. Herman's Full Olympians: "Athletics 1900". Accessed 18 March 2006. Available electronically at .
- Mallon, Bill (1998). The 1900 Olympic Games, Results for All Competitors in All Events, with Commentary. Jefferson, North Carolina: McFarland & Company, Inc., Publishers. ISBN 0-7864-0378-0.
