= Eugène Besse =

French long-distance runner

Eugène Marc Antoine Besse (17 November 1881 in Paris – 20 February 1919 in Paris) was a French track and field athlete who competed at the 1900 Summer Olympics in Paris, France. Besse competed in the marathon. He placed fourth with a time of 4:00:43 over the 40.26 kilometre course.
