= Dixon Boardman =

American track and field athlete

Dixon H. Boardman (March 26, 1880 in Nutley, New Jersey – October 15, 1954 in Beverly Hills, California) was an American track and field athlete who competed at the 1900 Summer Olympics in Paris, France.

Boardman competed in the 100 metres event, placing 12th or 13th overall. He finished second in his preliminary quarterfinal heat to advance to the semifinals, but there placed fourth in his heat to be eliminated.

Boardman also competed in the 400 metres, finishing in a tie for fourth place. He finished second in his semifinal (first-round) heat to qualify for the final, but was one of three Americans who refused to take part in the final because it was held on a Sunday.
