= Henry Slack =

American sprinter (1877–1928)

Henry Berry Slack (March 31, 1877 in Chicago, Illinois – July 18, 1928 in San Francisco, California) was an American track and field athlete who competed at the 1900 Summer Olympics in Paris, France.

Slack competed in the 100 metres event, placing third in his quarterfinal heat to be eliminated in the first round. He was similarly eliminated in the first round (this time, the semifinals) of the 400 metres.
