= Charles-Robert Faidide =

French sprinter

Charles-Robert Faidide (19 January 1880 in Paris – 3 July 1907 in Le Kremlin-Bicêtre) was a French track and field athlete who competed at the 1900 Summer Olympics in Paris, France.

Faidide competed in the 400 metres. He placed third in his first-round (semifinals) heat and did not advance to the final.
