= Eugène Neveu =

French athlete (1881–1927)

Personal information
- Nationality: French
- Born: Désiré Eugène Neveu; 29 January 1881 Paris (3rd), France
- Died: 14 July 1927 (aged 46) Paris (3rd), France
- Height: 179 cm (5 ft 10 in)

Sport
- Sport: Athletics
- Events: Middle-distance running Long-distance running Steeplechase
- Club: Club Sportif Français
Medal record
Men's athletics
Representing France
Olympic Games
Winner	1900 Paris	2,500 metres steeplechase (professionals)
Third place	1900 Paris	1500 metres (professionals)

Désiré Eugène Neveu (29 January 1881 – 14 July 1927) was a professional French middle-distance runner, long distance runner and steeplechase runner. He was a member of Club Sportif Français and competed in the 1900 Summer Olympics.

== Biography ==
Neveu won the Eiffel Tower stair-climbing championship in 1906

Neveu was born in the 3rd arrondissement of Paris in 1881. He competed in the professional athletics events during the 1900 Summer Olympics. He won the steeplechase event and finished third in the 1500 metres event. He also competed in the 5,000 metres event and the 6-hour race. These professional. events are nowadays not classified as non-medal events, as only amateur events of this era are official event.

He won the Eiffel Tower stair-climbing championship on 18 November 1906.

He finished third in the Tour de Paris on 4 August 1907. Neveu won the 15th professional Cross National at Meudon on 20 March 1910.

Neveu died on 14 July 1927 at the age of 46.

== Achievements ==
1900
1900 Summer Olympics

1st 2,500 metres steeplechase (professionals)
3rd 1500 metres (professionals)

1906
1st Eiffel Tower stair-climbing championship

1907
3rd Tour de Paris

1908
1st Cross National at Meudon
