= Harry Lee (athlete) =

American sprinter

Harry Glover Lee (February 22, 1877 in Waterloo, New York – March 10, 1937 in Los Angeles, California) was an American track and field athlete who competed at the 1900 Summer Olympics in Paris, France.

Lee competed in the 400 metres. He finished tied for fourth place overall. After taking second place in his first round semifinal heat, Lee (along with two of the four other Americans who had qualified for the final) refused to take part in the final because it was held on a Sunday.
