= Harrison Smith (runner) =

American distance runner (1876-1947)

Personal information
- Born: November 5, 1876 Winchester, New Hampshire, U.S.
- Died: August 24, 1947 (aged 70) Upper Montclair, New Jersey, U.S.

Sport
- Sport: Running
- Event: 800 meters
- College team: Yale

Harrison Preserved Smith (November 5, 1876 — August 24, 1947), was an American track and field athlete who competed at the 1900 Summer Olympics in Paris, France.

Smith competed in college for Yale. Smith competed in the 800 metres. He placed somewhere between fourth and sixth in his first-round (semifinals) heat and did not advance to the final.
