= Zoltán Speidl =

Hungarian athlete

Zoltán Speidl (17 March 1880 in Losonc – 3 July 1917 in Budapest) was a Hungarian track and field athlete who competed at the 1900 Summer Olympics.

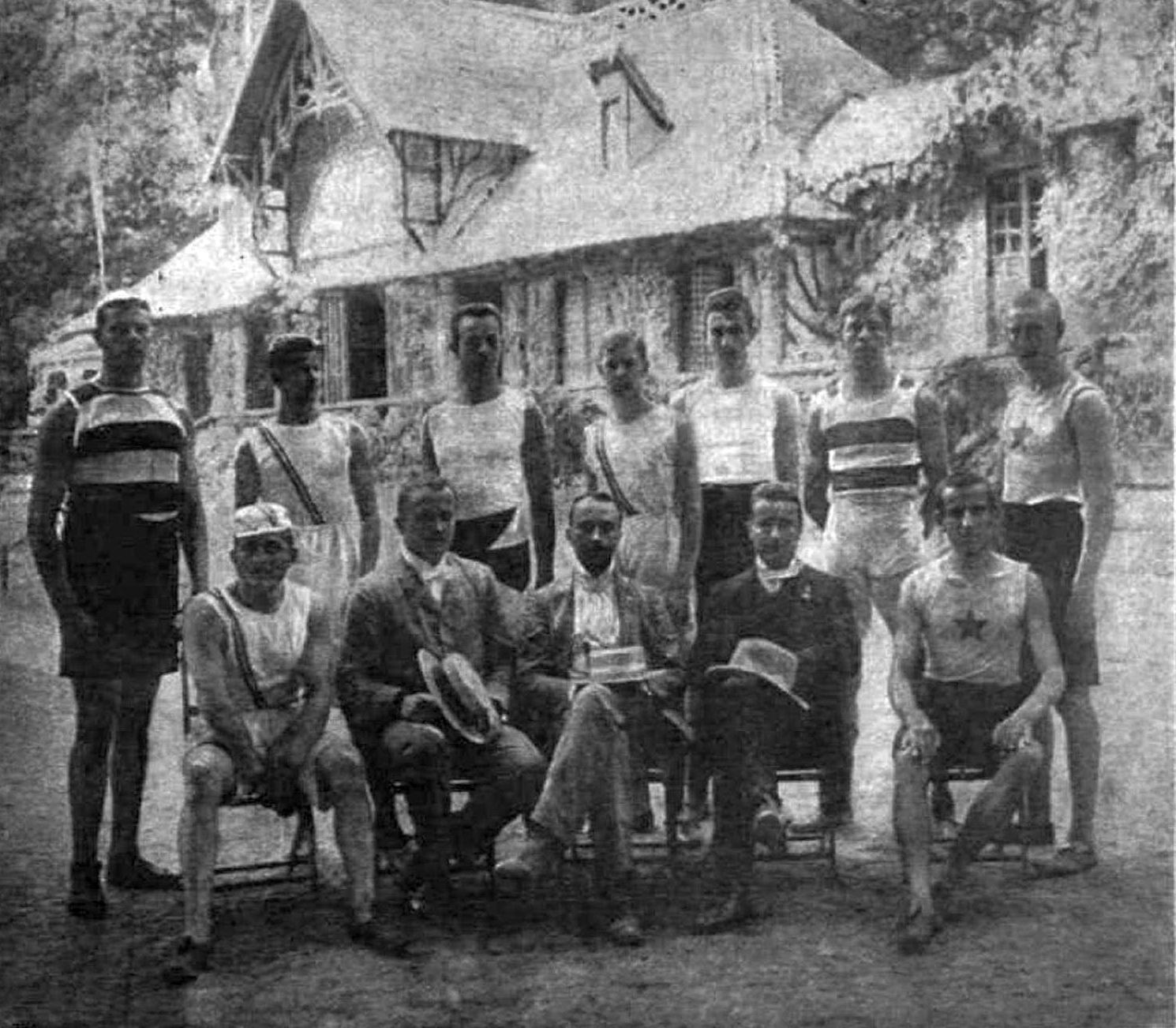
The Hungarian delegation at the 1900 Summer Olympics

He participated in the 400 metres competition and in the 200 metres hurdles competition, but was eliminated in the first round in both events. In the 800 metres competition he advanced to the final and finished fifth.
