= Edward Mechling =

American distance runner

Edward Anthony Mechling (January 31, 1878 in Hosensack, Pennsylvania – March 5, 1938 in Moorestown, New Jersey) was an American track and field athlete who competed at the 1900 Summer Olympics in Paris, France.

Mechling competed in the 800 metres. He placed fourth or fifth in his first-round (semifinals) heat and did not advance to the final.
