= 1893 AAA Championships =

Outdoor track and field competition

- Dates: 1 July 1893
- Host city: Northampton, England
- Venue: County Cricket Ground, Northampton
- Level: Senior
- Type: Outdoor
- Events: 14

The 1893 AAA Championships was an outdoor track and field competition organised by the Amateur Athletic Association (AAA), held on Saturday 1 July 1893 at the County Cricket Ground, Northampton in Northampton, England.

The 14 events were the same number and disciplines as in the previous year.

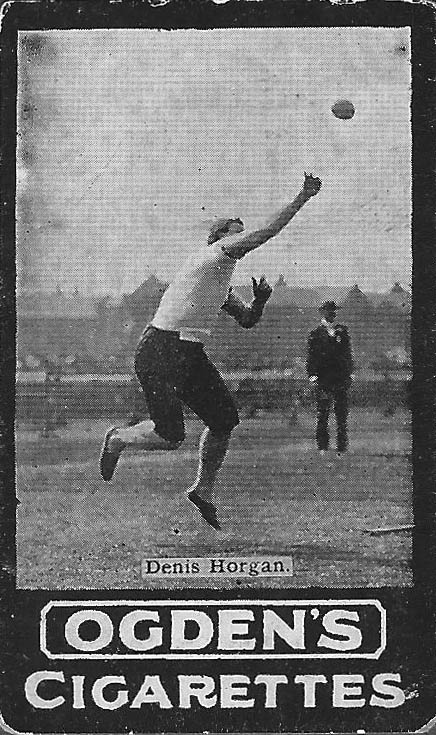
Denis Horgan

== Results ==
Event	Gold		Silver		Bronze	
100 yards	Charles Bradley	10.0 =NR	Hugh Bell	4 yd	only 2 competitors	
440 yards	(Gibraltar) Edgar Bredin	49.2	Arthur Ovenden	50.6	Osborn Holmden	5 yd
880 yards	(Gibraltar) Edgar Bredin	1:55.25	William Holmes	1:58.6	Anthony Millett	1:59.0
1 mile	Fred Bacon	4:22.2	William Fowler	4:24.2	William Lutyens	4:27.0
4 miles	Charles Pearce	20:12.6	Charles Willers	20:14.6	Sidney Thomas	20:26.6
10 miles	Sidney Thomas	52:41.4	Charles Pearce	54:11.2	Tom Birch	54:56.4
steeplechase	George Martin	10:44.0	C.W. Davies	10:54.4	Herbert Heath	
120yd hurdles	Godfrey Shaw	16.4	J. King	1 ft	(Wales) Arthur Gould	½ yd
7 miles walk	Harry Curtis	56:37.2	William Sturgess	60:07.0	F.J. Kimber	63:19.0
high jump	(Leinster) James Ryan	1.892	Thomas Jennings	1.791	Arthur Andrews	1.664
pole jump	Robert Dickinson	3.40	not awarded		only 1 competitor	
long jump	(Leinster) Tom Donovan	6.68	Arthur Square	6.48	Arthur Badger	6.43
shot put	(Leinster) Denis Horgan	13.03	(Scotland) R. Nelson Robbie	11.24	P.H. Cave	10.70
hammer throw	(Leinster) Denis Carey	37.60	(Scotland) R. Nelson Robbie	35.82	only 2 competitors	
