= Chotilsko =

- Municipality
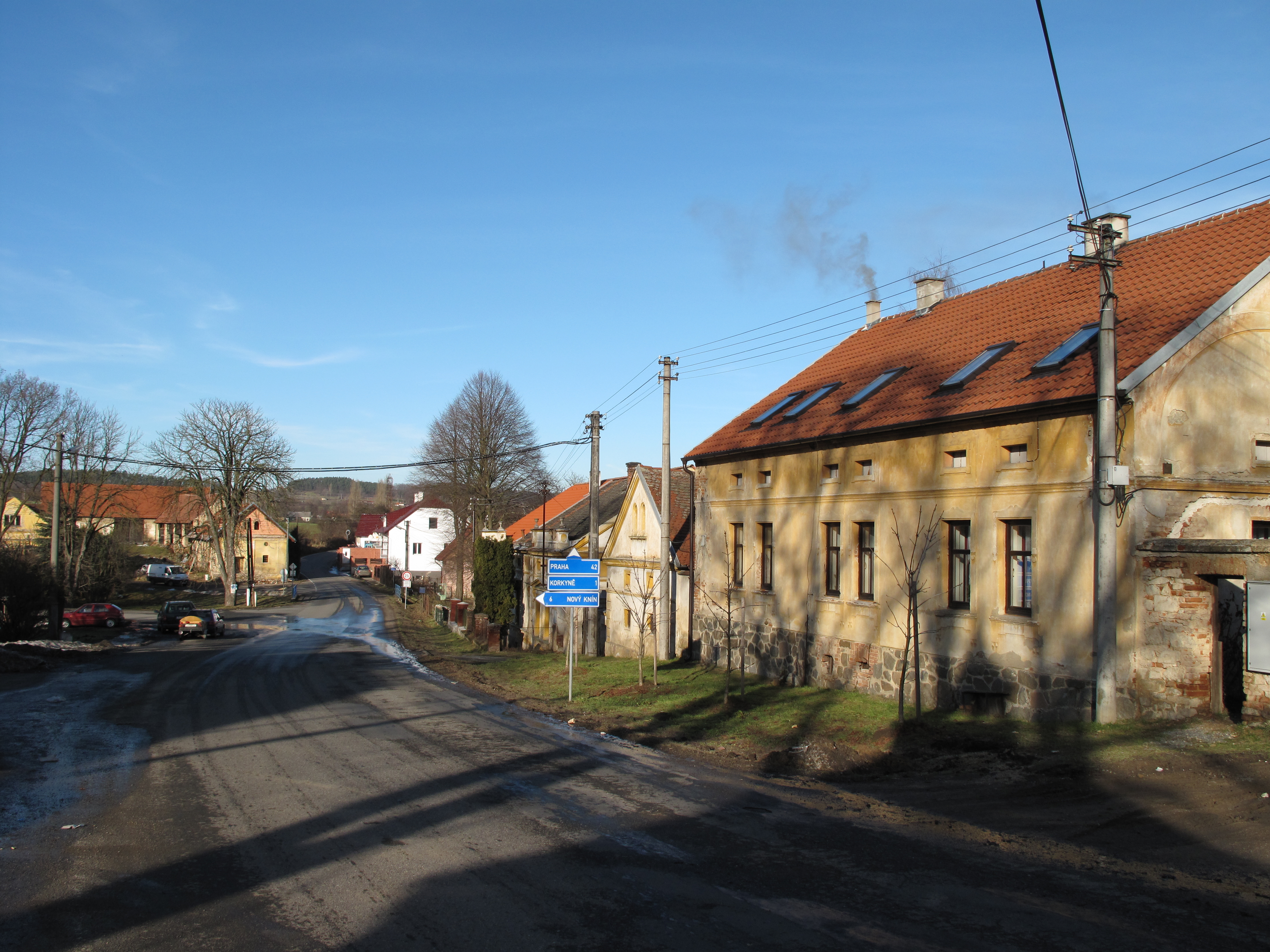
- Main road

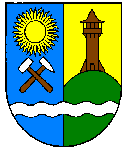
- Flag Coat of arms

- Location in the Czech Republic
- Coordinates: 49°46′14″N 14°21′9″E
- Country: Czech Republic
- Region: Central Bohemian
- District: Příbram
- First mentioned: 1359

Area
  - Total: 27.23 km^{2} (10.51 sq mi)
- Elevation: 340 m (1,120 ft)

Population (2026-01-01)
  - Total: 598
  - Density: 22.0/km^{2} (56.9/sq mi)
- Time zone: UTC+1 (CET)
  - Summer (DST): UTC+2 (CEST)
- Postal code: 262 03
- Website: www.chotilsko.cz

Chotilsko is a municipality and village in Příbram District in the Central Bohemian Region of the Czech Republic. It has about 600 inhabitants.

== Administrative division ==
Chotilsko consists of 13 municipal parts (in brackets population according to the 2021 census):

- Chotilsko (130)
- Cholín-Boubovny (4)
- Hněvšín (14)
- Knihy (0)
- Kobylníky (0)
- Křeničná (44)
- Lipí (18)
- Mokrsko (55)
- Prostřední Lhota (172)
- Sejcká Lhota (35)
- Smilovice (34)
- Záborná Lhota (95)
- Živohošť (13)

== Etymology ==
The name is derived from the personal name Chotěl. The suffix -sko indicates that the village was founded on the site of another village, which was abandoned.

== Geography ==
Chotilsko is located about 27 kilometres (17 mi) northeast of Příbram and 29 km (18 mi) south of Prague. It lies in the Benešov Uplands. The highest point is the hill Besedná at 497 m (1,631 ft) above sea level. The municipality is situated on the left shore of the Slapy Reservoir, built on the Vltava River. There are several fishponds in the municipal territory.

== History ==
The first written mention of Chotilsko is from 1359. From 1411, the village belonged to the Korkyně estate. In 1680, Chotilsko was annexed to the Slapy estate, owned by the Zbraslav Monastery From 1825 until the establishment of a sovereign municipality in 1850, the village was a property of Count Karel Bedřich Srb.

== Demographics ==
Historical population

Year	Pop.	±%
1869	912	—
1880	992	+8.8%
1890	984	−0.8%
1900	919	−6.6%
1910	887	−3.5%

Year	Pop.	±%
1921	848	−4.4%
1930	800	−5.7%
1950	627	−21.6%
1961	548	−12.6%
1970	467	−14.8%

Year	Pop.	±%
1980	444	−4.9%
1991	351	−20.9%
2001	366	+4.3%
2011	434	+18.6%
2021	614	+41.5%

Source: Censuses

== Transport ==
There are no railways or major roads passing through the municipality.

== Sights ==
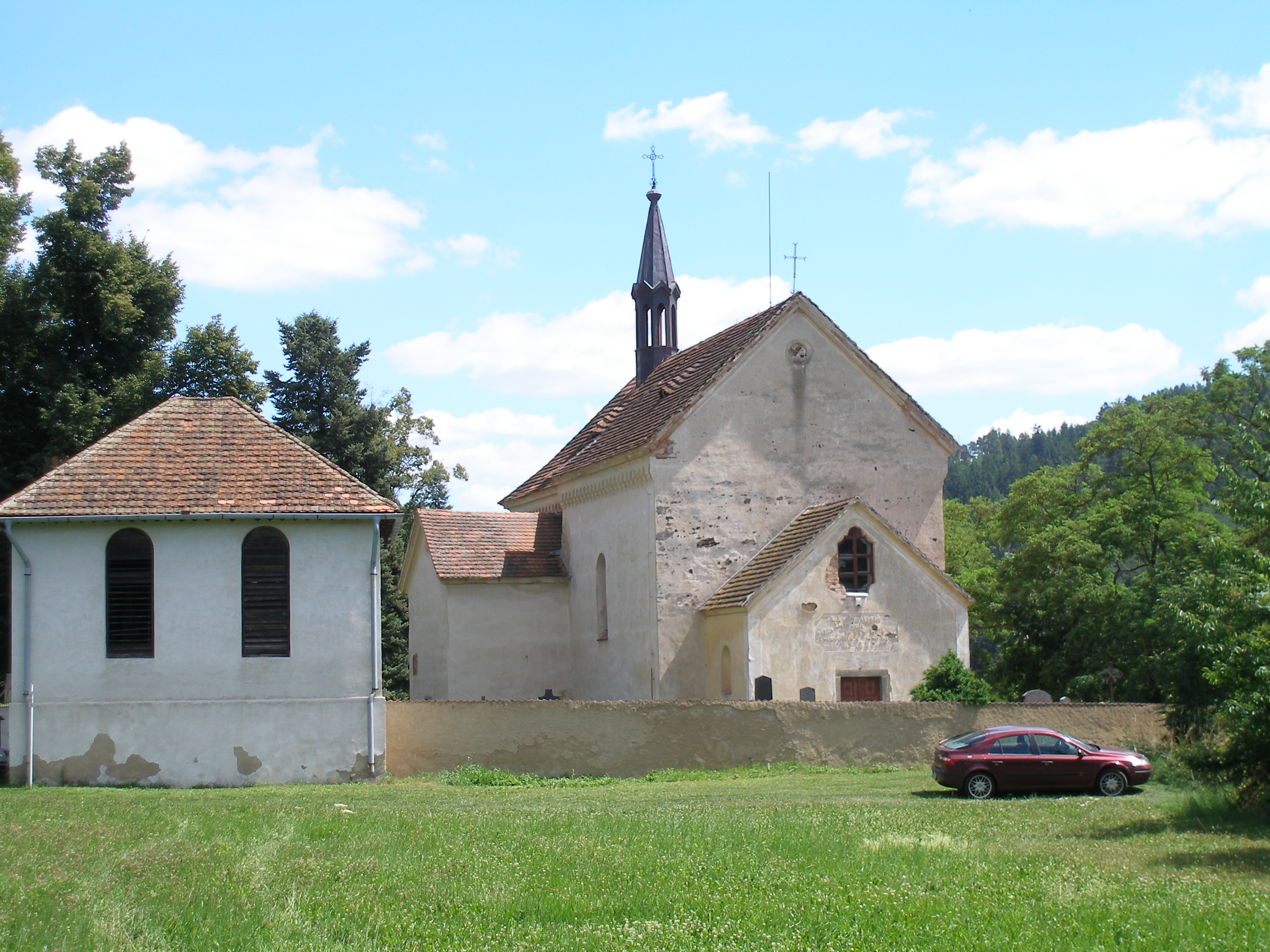
Church of Saints Fabian and Sebastian

The most important monument is the Church of Saints Fabian and Sebastian, located in Živohošť. The original church was a Romanesque building from the 11th century, built inside a gord of the Přemyslid dynasty. It was originally a three-nave basilica, which is rare for the Czech countryside. Around 1380, it was rebuilt in the Gothic style. Further modifications were made in the 15th and 16th centuries and then in the neo-Romanesque style in 1858–1859.

== Notable people ==
- Ondřej Pukl (1876–1936), track and field athlete
