= Athletics at the 1900 Summer Olympics – Men's 800 metres =

Men's 800 metres at the Games of the II Olympiad
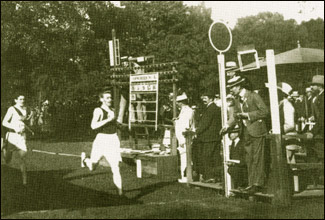
- Finish of the final
- Venue: Bois de Boulogne
- Dates: July 14, 1900 (semifinals); July 16, 1900 (final)
- Competitors: 18 from 7 nations
- Winning time: 2:01.2

Medalists
1st place, gold medalist(s)		Alfred Tysoe; Great Britain
2nd place, silver medalist(s)		John Cregan; United States
3rd place, bronze medalist(s)		David Hall; United States

The men's 800 metres was middle-distance running event on the athletics programme at the 1900 Summer Olympics in Paris. It was held on July 14 and July 16, 1900. The races were held on a track of 500 metres in circumference. 18 athletes from seven nations competed. The event was won by Alfred Tysoe of Great Britain, the nation's first medal in the event. The United States also won its first medals in the 800 metres, with silver and bronze.

== Background ==
This was the second appearance of the event, which is one of 12 athletics events to have been held at every Summer Olympics. None of the runners from 1896 returned. Among the favorites were Alexander Grant of the United States (1899 AAU one-mile champion) and Alfred Tysoe of Great Britain (1897 AAA one-mile champion).

Bohemia, Denmark, Italy, and the United States appeared in the event for the first time. France, Great Britain, and Hungary each made their second appearance, having also appeared in 1896.

== Competition format ==
There were two rounds: heats and a final. There were three heats, of between 5 and 7 runners each. The top 2 runners in each heat advanced to the final.

== Records ==
These were the standing world and Olympic records (in minutes) prior to the 1900 Summer Olympics.

World record	Charles Kilpatrick (USA)	1:53.4 (y)(u)	New York City, United States	21 September 1895
Olympic record	Edwin Flack (AUS)	2:10.0	Athens, Greece	6 April 1896

In the first heat of the first round David Hall set a new Olympic record with 1:59.0.

== Schedule ==
Date	Time	Round
Saturday, 14 July 1900	10:15	Round 1
Monday, 16 July 1900		Final

== Results ==
=== Semifinals ===
In the first round, there were three semifinals. The top two runners in each advanced to the final.

==== Semifinal 1 ====
Hall's Olympic record time surprised most of those present, as Tysoe had been the favorite in the heat.

Rank	Athlete	Nation	Time	Notes
1	David Hall	United States	1:59.0	Q, OR
2	Alfred Tysoe	Great Britain	1:59.4	Q
3	Howard Hayes	United States	2:00.2	
4	Maurice Salomez	France	Unknown	
5	Christian Christensen	Denmark	Unknown	
6–7	Walter Drumheller	United States	Unknown	
6–7	Alexander Grant	United States	Unknown	

==== Semifinal 2 ====
Deloge finished three yards in front of Spiedl, with the other runners trailing.

Rank	Athlete	Nation	Time	Notes
1	Henri Deloge	France	2:00.6	Q
2	Zoltán Speidl	Hungary	2:01.1	Q
3	Justus Scrafford	United States	2:01.8	
4–6	Emilio Banfi	Italy	Unknown	
4–6	Edward Bushnell	United States	Unknown	
4–6	Harrison Smith	United States	Unknown	

==== Semifinal 3 ====
Cregan won the slowest of the three heats by six yards.

Rank	Athlete	Nation	Time	Notes
1	John Cregan	United States	2:03.0	Q
2	John Bray	United States	2:03.9	Q
3	Harvey Lord	United States	2:04.5	
4–5	Edward Mechling	United States	Unknown	
4–5	Ondřej Pukl	Bohemia	Unknown	

=== Final ===
Deloge led early, but was passed just before the final straight by Tysoe and Cregan. Hall, who had set an Olympic record in the heats, was just barely able to catch Deloge to finish third, but had no chance of passing the two leaders.

Rank	Athlete	Nation	Time
1st place, gold medalist(s)	Alfred Tysoe	Great Britain	2:01.2
2nd place, silver medalist(s)	John Cregan	United States	2:03.0
3rd place, bronze medalist(s)	David Hall	United States	2:03.8
4	Henri Deloge	France	Unknown
5	Zoltán Speidl	Hungary	Unknown
6	John Bray	United States	Unknown

== Results summary ==
Rank	Athlete	Nation	Semifinals	Final	Notes
1st place, gold medalist(s)	Alfred Tysoe	Great Britain	1:59.4	2:01.2	
2nd place, silver medalist(s)	John Cregan	United States	2:03.0	2:03.0	
3rd place, bronze medalist(s)	David Hall	United States	1:59.0	2:03.8	OR
4	Henri Deloge	France	2:00.6	Unknown	
5	Zoltán Speidl	Hungary	2:01.1	Unknown	
6	John Bray	United States	2:03.9	Unknown	
7	Howard Hayes	United States	2:00.2	Did not advance	
7	Justus Scrafford	United States	2:01.8	Did not advance	
7	Harvey Lord	United States	2:04.5	Did not advance	
10	Maurice Salomez	France	Unknown	Did not advance	4th in semifinal
11	Edward Mechling	United States	Unknown	Did not advance	4th–5th in semifinal
11	Ondřej Pukl	Bohemia	Unknown	Did not advance	4th–5th in semifinal
13	Christian Christensen	Denmark	Unknown	Did not advance	5th in semifinal
14	Emilio Banfi	Italy	Unknown	Did not advance	4th–6th in semifinal
14	Edward Bushnell	United States	Unknown	Did not advance	4th–6th in semifinal
14	Harrison Smith	United States	Unknown	Did not advance	4th–6th in semifinal
17	Walter Drumheller	United States	Unknown	Did not advance	6th–7th in semifinal
17	Alexander Grant	United States	Unknown	Did not advance	6th–7th in semifinal

== Sources ==
- International Olympic Committee.
- De Wael, Herman. Herman's Full Olympians: "Athletics 1900". Accessed 18 March 2006. Available electronically at.
- Mallon, Bill (1998). The 1900 Olympic Games, Results for All Competitors in All Events, with Commentary. Jefferson, North Carolina: McFarland & Company, Inc., Publishers. ISBN 0-7864-0378-0.
