= Walter Drumheller =

American sprinter

Walter Edwin Drumheller (November 9, 1878 in Sunbury, Pennsylvania – May 18, 1958 in Sunbury, Pennsylvania) was an American track and field athlete who competed at the 1900 Summer Olympics in Paris, France.

Drumheller competed in the 400 metres. He placed fifth in his first-round (semifinals) heat and did not advance to the final. Similarly, he placed sixth or seventh in the first round semifinals of the 800 metres and did not advance to the final.
