= Auguste Marchais =

French long-distance runner (1872–1952)

Auguste Marchais (4 October 1872 in Paris – 16 November 1952 in Courbevoie) was a French runner who ran the men's marathon at the 1900 Summer Olympics in Paris and one of six men who did not finish.
