= Athletics at the 1900 Summer Olympics – Men's 5000 metres team race =

Athletics at the Olympics

Men's 5000 metres team race at the Games of the II Olympiad
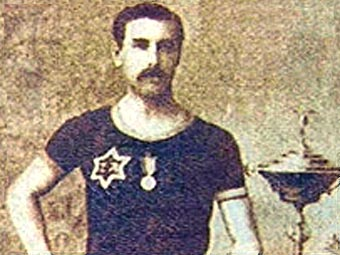
- Charles Bennett, who finished first to lead the AAA team to victory
- Venue: Bois de Boulogne
- Date: July 22, 1900
- Competitors: 10 from 3 nations
- Winning score: 26

Medalists
1st place, gold medalist(s)		Amateur Athletic Association of England; Great Britain
2nd place, silver medalist(s)		Racing Club de France; France

The men's 5000 metres team race was the final track and field event on the athletics programme at the 1900 Summer Olympics in Paris. It was the first time that a team race was held at the Olympics. It was held on July 22, 1900. Two teams competed: Racing Club de France from France and Amateur Athletic Association of England from multiple nations (Stan Rowley of Australia completed an otherwise British team). Each team had five athletes. The AAA team won the competition, despite Rowley being injured and unable to finish.

== Background ==
This was the first Olympic team race, but the only time the event was held at a distance of 5000 metres. The distance would vary at 4 miles in 1904 and 3 miles in 1908, before consistency was reached beginning in 1912, with the 3000 metres distance used that year as well as in 1920 and 1924.

After 1924, the team race was then removed from the program, and has not featured again since.

== Competition format ==
The event consisted of a single heat in which each of the ten runners completed ten laps of the 500 metre track. Runners scored points for their team equal to their place in the race, with the team with the lowest number of points winning.

== Records ==
This was the first major international 5000 metre race with team scoring, and one of the first major 5000 metres races in history overall. Though the distance was relatively new, the fastest time recorded over a comparable distance was 15:54 for 3 1/4 miles (5230m), which was a split time in a 4-mile race by Walter George in 1884. Though a specific 5000m split was not taken, this pace converts to about a 15:11 5000m.

World record	Walter George (GBR)	15:54 (3 1/4 miles)	London	17 May 1884
Olympic record	N/A			

Charles Bennett set the defacto Olympic and World records for the event in the competition, winning in 15:29.2.

== Schedule ==
Date	Time	Round
Sunday, 22 July 1900		Final

== Results ==
Rimmer and Bennett led the entire way, followed by the first three Frenchmen not far behind. Tysoe and Robinson kept pace with Castanet and Champoudry in the third bunch of runners, while Rowley had been injured and began walking after completing the first lap.

Bennett pulled away from Rimmer in the final sprint, followed by three Frenchmen. Champoudry crossed the finish line in ninth, leaving the injured Rowley as the only athlete still running, though he was clearly in pain and had been lapped thrice.

While the rules of the event stated all team five members had to finish for the team to score, race officials agreed it would be pointless for Rowley to walk the final 1500 metres, and allowed him to retire at the end of his seventh lap.

=== Individual standings ===
Rank	Athlete	Team	Nation	Time	Points
1	Charles Bennett	Amateur Athletic Association of England	Great Britain	15:29.2	1
2	John Rimmer	Amateur Athletic Association of England	Great Britain	Unknown	2
3	Henri Deloge	Racing Club de France	France	Unknown	3
4	Gaston Ragueneau	Racing Club de France	France	Unknown	4
5	Jacques Chastanié	Racing Club de France	France	Unknown	5
6	Sidney Robinson	Amateur Athletic Association of England	Great Britain	Unknown	6
7	Alfred Tysoe	Amateur Athletic Association of England	Great Britain	Unknown	7
8	André Castanet	Racing Club de France	France	Unknown	8
9	Michel Champoudry	Racing Club de France	France	Unknown	9
—	Stan Rowley	Amateur Athletic Association of England	Great Britain	DNF	10

=== Team standings ===
Rank	Team	Nation	Points
1st place, gold medalist(s)	Amateur Athletic Association of England	Great Britain	26
2nd place, silver medalist(s)	Racing Club de France	France	29
