= Charles Aubry (athlete) =

French long-distance runner

Personal information
- Nationality: France
- Born: 19th-century
- Died: 20th-century

Sport
- Sport: Long distance running
- Event: 5000 metres
- Club: Red Star Club Paris (1899); Racing Club Dionysien (1900)
Medal record
Men's athletics
Representing France
Summer Olympics
Third place	1900 Paris	5,000 metres (professionals)

Charles Aubry was a French professional long distance runner during the 1890s and 1900s. He was a member of Red Star Club Paris and Racing Club Dionysien.

On 26 November 1899 he broke in Paris the two years old French national 10,000 metres record of Georges Touquet-Daunis with a time of 35:25.4 being 3.4 seconds faster than the previous record time of Touquet-Daunis.

In 1900 he represented the French team at the 1900 Summer Olympics in the 5000 metres for professionals. In this event he finished third 7 metres behind Albert Charbonnel and 2 metres behind Emile Laurent and earned 60 FFr. His achievement was lost for years, but found back in 2023 by Olympic historians. Before July 2021 the IOC has never decided which events were official Olympic events and which were not. The professional events are not recognized by the International Olympic Committee as official Olympic medal competitions, as only amateur events are counted as official events.
