= Athletics at the 1900 Summer Olympics – Men's 400 metres =

Men's 400 metres at the Games of the II Olympiad
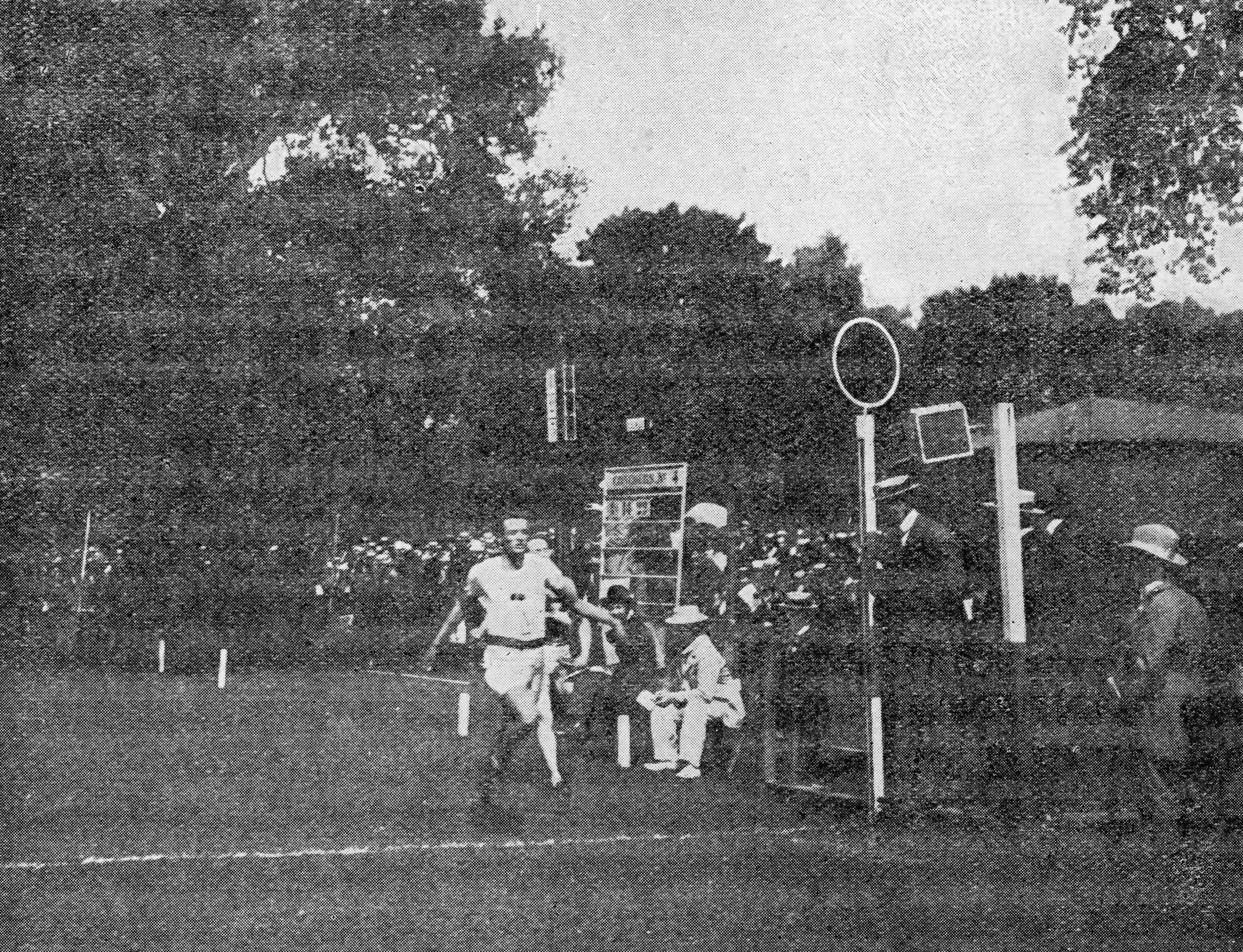
- W. L. Long (New York A. C.) winning in 49 s. 2/5
- Venue: Bois de Boulogne
- Dates: July 14, 1900 (semifinals); July 15, 1900 (final)
- Competitors: 15 from 6 nations
- Winning time: 54.2 OR

Medalists
1st place, gold medalist(s)		Maxie Long; United States
2nd place, silver medalist(s)		William Holland; United States
3rd place, bronze medalist(s)		Ernst Schultz; Denmark

The men's 400 metres was a track & field athletics event at the 1900 Summer Olympics in Paris. It was held on July 14, and July 15, 1900. The races were held on a track of 500 metres in circumference. 15 athletes from six nations competed.

== Background ==
This was the second time the event was held. None of the runners from 1896 returned. Maxie Long of the United States was favored, as 1898 and 1899 AAU champion and 1900 AAA champion. His countryman Dixon Boardman was a strong challenger, having beaten Long at the 1900 IC4A.

The United States and France made their second appearances in the event; Denmark, Hungary, Italy, and Norway made their debuts.

== Competition format ==
There were two rounds: heats and a final. The top 2 runners in each heat advanced to the final.

== Records ==
These were the standing world and Olympic records (in seconds) prior to the 1900 Summer Olympics.

World record	Edgar Bredin (GBR)	48.5(*)	London, United Kingdom	22 June 1895
Olympic record	Thomas Burke (USA)	54.2	Athens, Greece	7 April 1896

(*) unofficial 440 yards (= 402.34 m)

Maxie Long set a new Olympic record in the first round with 50.4 seconds. In the final he improved his own record when he ran 49.4 seconds.

== Schedule ==
All times are Central European Time (UTC+1)

Date	Time	Round
Saturday, 14 July 1900	11:25	Semifinals
Sunday, 15 July 1900	15:00	Final

== Results ==
=== Semifinals ===
In the first round, there were three heats. They were held on July 14. The top two runners in each advanced to the final.

==== Semifinal 1 ====
This heat, featuring four American runners, resulted in an easy win for Long and the top three spots for the United States team.

Rank	Athlete	Nation	Time	Notes
1	Maxie Long	United States	50.4	Q, OR
2	Harry Lee	United States	Unknown	Q
3	Harvey Lord	United States	Unknown	
4	Georges Clément	France	Unknown	
5	Walter Drumheller	United States	Unknown	

==== Semifinal 2 ====
Again, an American won the heat easily. Schulz took second place to qualify for the final.

Rank	Athlete	Nation	Time	Notes
1	William Moloney	United States	51.0	Q
2	Ernst Schultz	Denmark	Unknown	Q
3	Charles-Robert Faidide	France	Unknown	
4	Pál Koppán	Hungary	Unknown	
5	Yngvar Bryn	Norway	Unknown	

==== Semifinal 3 ====
The United States runners again took all three of the top spots in this heat.

Rank	Athlete	Nation	Time	Notes
1	Dixon Boardman	United States	51.2	Q
2	William Holland	United States	Unknown	Q
3	Henry Slack	United States	Unknown	
4–5	Zoltán Speidl	Hungary	Unknown	
4–5	Umberto Colombo	Italy	Unknown	

=== Final ===
Boardman, Lee, and Moloney all withdrew because the final was held on a Sunday, but Long and Holland elected to start.

Long led the entire way to beat Holland by five yards, with Schultz finishing 20 yards behind the Americans.

Rank	Athlete	Nation	Time	Notes
1st place, gold medalist(s)	Maxie Long	United States	49.4	OR
2nd place, silver medalist(s)	William Holland	United States	49.6	
3rd place, bronze medalist(s)	Ernst Schultz	Denmark	51.5	
—	Dixon Boardman	United States	DNS	
—	Harry Lee	United States	DNS	
—	William Moloney	United States	DNS	

== Results summary ==
Rank	Athlete	Nation	Semifinals	Final	Notes
1st place, gold medalist(s)	Maxie Long	United States	50.4	49.4	OR
2nd place, silver medalist(s)	William Holland	United States	Unknown	49.6	
3rd place, bronze medalist(s)	Ernst Schultz	Denmark	Unknown	51.5	
4	Dixon Boardman	United States	51.2	DNS	
4	Harry Lee	United States	Unknown	DNS	
4	William Moloney	United States	51.0	DNS	
7	Charles-Robert Faidide	France	Unknown	Did not advance	3rd in semifinal
7	Harvey Lord	United States	Unknown	Did not advance	3rd in semifinal
7	Henry Slack	United States	Unknown	Did not advance	3rd in semifinal
10	Georges Clément	France	Unknown	Did not advance	4th in semifinal
10	Pál Koppán	Hungary	Unknown	Did not advance	4th in semifinal
12	Zoltán Speidl	Hungary	Unknown	Did not advance	4th–5th in semifinal
12	Umberto Colombo	Italy	Unknown	Did not advance	4th–5th in semifinal
14	Yngvar Bryn	Norway	Unknown	Did not advance	5th in semifinal
14	Walter Drumheller	United States	Unknown	Did not advance	5th in semifinal

== Sources ==
- International Olympic Committee.
- De Wael, Herman. Herman's Full Olympians: "Athletics 1900". Accessed 18 March 2006. Available electronically at.
- Mallon, Bill (1998). The 1900 Olympic Games, Results for All Competitors in All Events, with Commentary. Jefferson, North Carolina: McFarland & Company, Inc., Publishers. ISBN 0-7864-0378-0.
