= Georges Clément =

French athlete

Georges Claude Clément was a French track and field athlete who competed at the 1900 Summer Olympics in Paris, France.

Clément competed in the 400 metres. He placed fourth in his first-round (semifinals) heat and did not advance to the final.
