= Alfred Tysoe =

British athlete

Personal information
- Born: 21 March 1874 Padiham, near Burnley England
- Died: 26 October 1901 (aged 27) Blackpool, England

Sport
- Sport: Athletics
- Event: middle distance
- Club: Salford Harriers
Medal record
Men's athletics
Representing Great Britain
Olympic Games
Gold medal – first place	1900 Paris	800 metres
Gold medal – first place	1900 Paris	5000 metre team race

Alfred Ernest Tysoe (21 March 1874 – 26 October 1901) was an English athlete, and winner of two gold medals at the 1900 Olympic Games representing Great Britain.

== Biography ==
Born in the Old Vicarage, Padiham, near Burnley England, Tysoe ran part-time with the Skerton Harriers running team while still working as a farm labourer.

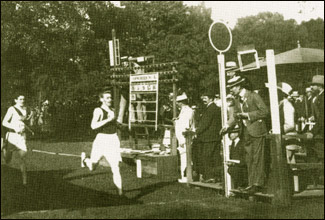
Tysoe winning the Olympic 800 m

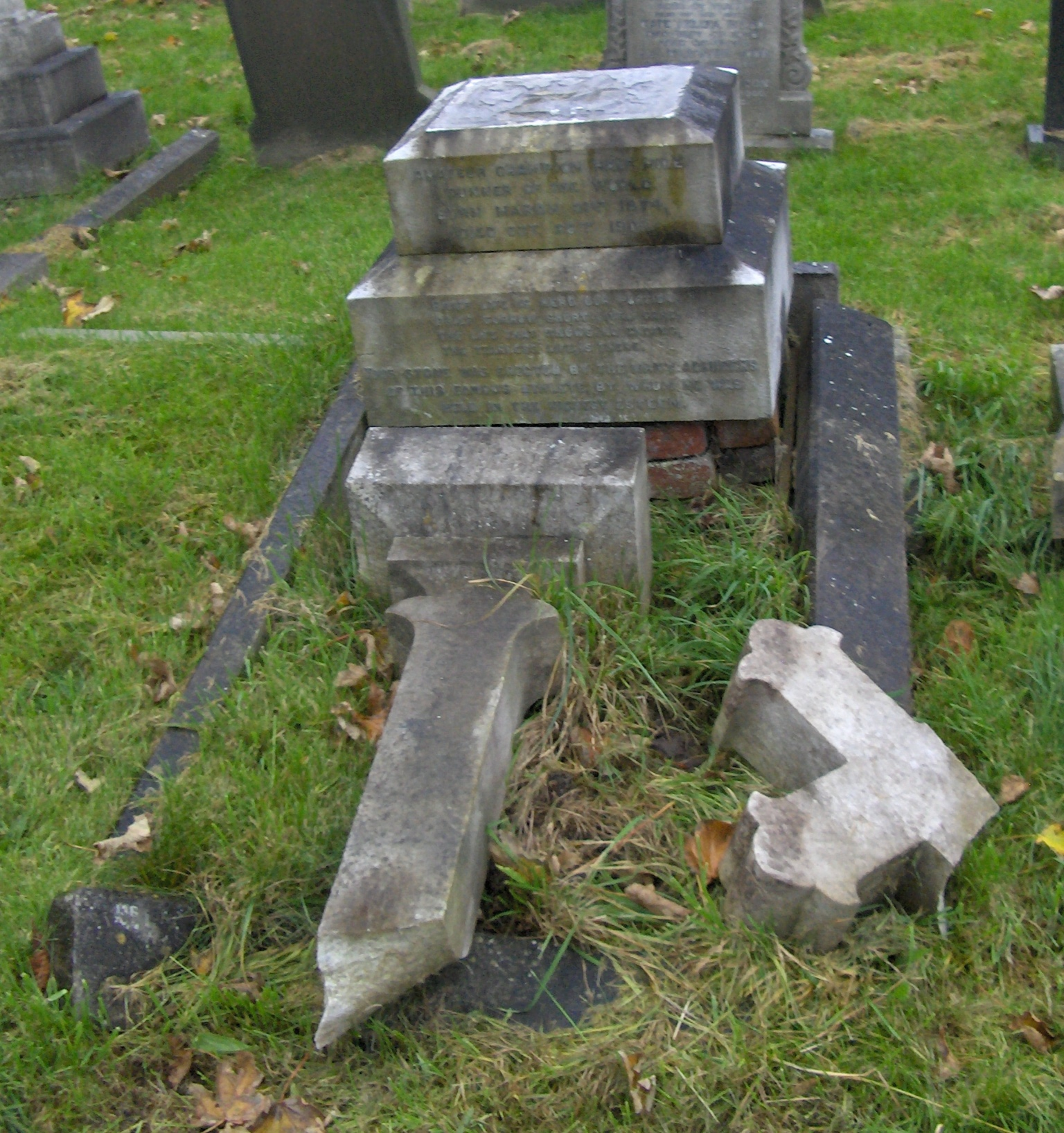
Alfred Tysoe's grave

In 1896, he won the Northern Counties 1000 y and one mile titles. His running successes brought him to the attention of Harold Hardwick, founder of Salford Harriers in 1884; in 1897 Tysoe was persuaded to join the Salford club. Within his first year with Salford Harriers, he had won the Amateur Athletic Association Championships in the one and ten miles events at the 1897 AAA Championships.In 1898, he helped the team to win their sixth National Cross Country championship.

At the 1900 Olympic Games in Paris, Tysoe was a favourite in the 800 m, having just one week before the games won the 1900 AAA Championships in 1:57.8. He won easily, beating John Cregan from the United States by 3 yards. He also won a gold medal as part of the British team in the 5000 m team race.

This proved to be his last season on the running track. In 1901, he became severely ill with pleurisy and died at his home in Blackpool, aged 27.

He is buried in Layton Cemetery, Blackpool. His gravestone reads: "In loving memory of Alfred Ernest Tysoe. Amateur Champion half-mile runner of the world. Born 21 March 1874, Died 26 October 1901. 'Brief life is here our portion, brief sorrow, short-lived care. The life that knows no ending, the tearless life is there.' This stone was erected by the many admirers of this famous athlete, by whom he was held in the highest esteem."
