= Edgar Bredin =

British middle-distance runner (1968-1934)

Personal information
- Full name: Edgar Chichester Bredin
- Nationality: British
- Born: 6 March 1868 Gibraltar
- Died: 28 January 1934 (aged 65) San Francisco, California, U.S.

Sport
- Sport: Athletics
- Events: 440 yards/400 metres 880 yards 1,500 metres
- Club: London Athletic Club
Medal record
Men's athletics
Representing United Kingdom
Olympic Games
Winner	1900 Paris	100 metres (professionals)
Winner	1900 Paris	400 metres (professionals)
Winner	1900 Paris	1500 metres (professionals)
Representing London Athletic Club
AAA Championships
Gold medal – first place	1893 Northampton	440-yard
Gold medal – first place	1893 Northampton	880-yard
Gold medal – first place	1894 Huddersfield	440-yard
Gold medal – first place	1894 Huddersfield	880-yard
Gold medal – first place	1895 London	880-yard
Silver medal – second place	1895 London	440-yard
Bronze medal – third place	1892 London	440-yard

Edgar Chichester Bredin (6 March 1868 – 28 January 1934) was a British middle-distance runner and sports writer. Born in Gibraltar, he later lived in Great Britain, Canada and the United States.

He competed for the London Athletic Club and is "considered one of England's greatest athletes having dominated middle-distance races in the first half of the 1890s". He became world record holder in the 440-yard and won at the 1900 Summer Olympics the professional 100 metres, 400 metres and 1500 metres events. He became multiple times national champion, winning the Amateur Athletic Association (AAA) championships five times in the 440-yard and 880-yard.

== Biography ==
=== Early life ===
Bredin was born in Gibraltar on 6 March 1868 as the son of Lieutenant-Colonel Edgar Grantham Bredin of the Royal Artillery. His father died when Edgar was five years old. He studied at the Wellington College in Berkshire and subsequently spent five years in Canada, where he joined the North-West Mounted Police.

=== Amateur career ===
Bredin returned to Britain in 1892. Representing the London Athletic Club, he competed in middle-distance races and "is still considered one of England's greatest athletes having dominated middle-distance races in the first half of the 1890s".

He won at the AAA Championships the 440-yard event in 1893 and again in 1894, while also winning the 880-yard championship in 1893 and 1894. He was third in the AAA 440 yards in 1892 and runner-up in 1895.

His performances also included notable marks over 440, 600 and 880 yards and ran the British records over 440 and 600 yards. In June 1895 he set in London the world record in the 400 metres (set over the 440 yards (402.34 m) imperial distance) with a time of 48.5 seconds.

In 1896 he was defeated in a race by Australian runner Arthur Graham Butler, who beat both Bredin and British middle-distance champion William King.

=== Professional career ===
Bredin turned professional as an attempt, according to himself, to establish how his ability compared with professional runners. At a major contest at Stamford Bridge in 1897 he defeated American professional runner Charles Henry Kilpatrick, who was then described as the professional world record holder over 800 metres. He ran a mile in 4:16.4 and his rivalry with fellow professional runner A. R. Downer attracted a crowd of more than 12,000 spectators.

At the 1900 Summer Olympics in Paris, Bredin competed in three of the professional athletics events. He won all three, the professional competitions over 100 metres, 400 metres and 1,500 metres, all on the same day. As these were professional events, these events are nowadays not classified as medal events, as only amateur events are only officially counted as Olympic events.

=== Writing and later life ===
Bredin later became a sports writer. In 1902 he published the book Running and Training, a book that presented his personal views on running and athletic preparation.

Bredin also had interests in tea planting in Ceylon, spent time in Canada and was a member of the theatrical profession. He married and immigrated to the United States, while continuing to travel between England, the United States and Canada. By 1930 he worked in a clerical or office occupation.

Bredin died in San Francisco, California, on 28 January 1934, aged 65.

== Bibliography ==
- Running and Training (1902)
