= Michel Théato =

Luxembourgish long-distance runner

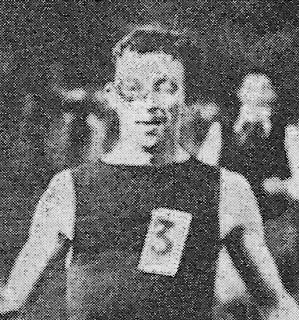
- Théato in 1900

Medal record

Men's athletics

Representing France

Olympic Games
Gold medal – first place	1900 Paris	Marathon

Michel Johann Théato (22 March 1878 – 2 April 1923) was a Luxembourgish born French long-distance runner, and the winner of the marathon at the 1900 Olympics in Paris running for France. He was born in Luxembourg City, Luxembourg and died in Paris, France.

== Early life ==
Little is known about Théato's early life. For many years it was believed he was a baker's delivery boy in Paris. He also worked for some time as a cabinetmaker. In the 20th century, Alain Bouillé discovered that Théato was born in Luxembourg and had moved to Belgium before settling down in the Paris suburbs. There is no evidence that Théato ever applied for French citizenship. Théato was a member of the athletics club in Saint-Mandé in Paris.

== 1900 Olympics ==
The marathon started at 2:30pm in blazing heat. There were only 13 starters of the race, of whom 6 finished. Théato won the race with a time of 2:59:45 with 4 min 32 s ahead of Émile Champion and 37 min 39 s over Sweden's Ernst Fast under the eyes of more than 5,000 spectators.

Théato's victory was initially disputed, as several of his opponents, including American runner Arthur Newton, who finished fifth, alleged that Théato had cheated by taking multiple shortcuts, helped by his local knowledge of the Parisian streets through his job as a delivery boy. These allegations have since been disproved.

The first three finishers only receive as rewards after the race porcelain pottery, of no real value, provided by an ungenerous industrialist; these were commented on at the time as being “objects of horror” or even “hardware”.

Olympic gold, silver and bronze medals were not introduced until the following Olympiad in Saint-Louis in 1904, and the winners of the 1900 marathon did not receive their medals retroactively until 1912, without ceremony.

== Sports nationality ==
The athletics statistician Alain Bouillé revealed at the end of the 20th century that Théato was not yet French at the time of the Games. Born in the Grand-Duchy of Luxembourg, he arrived in France at the age of 12. He should have done his military service at the time of the Games if he had obtained his naturalization before 1900. Luxembourg never claimed this title and the IOC confirmed the “French” victory after Bouillé's work. The Grand Duchy of Luxembourg lodged an official complaint with the International Olympic Committee and petitioned to change the Olympic record of Théato's nationality; the complaint was officially rejected in 2004. In 2021, the IOC site mistakenly displayed the Luxembourg flag on Michel Théato's page, which led some to believe that Luxembourg had officially recovered this Olympic title. It was actually a technical error in the IOC database, error since corrected, between nationality and NOC represented by the athlete.

== Later life ==
Théato later became a professional runner, although with relatively little success. He set a personal best in the marathon of 2:42 in 1901.
