= Franz Duhne =

German middle-distance runner

Francis Johann Wilhelm "Franz" Duhne (2 July 1880 – 12 December 1945) was a German track and field athlete who competed at the 1900 Summer Olympics in Paris, France. Duhne competed in the 2500 metre steeplechase. He placed last in the six-man field. In the 4000 metre steeplechase, he placed sixth of eight. He was born in Barmbek and died in Milwaukee, Wisconsin.
