= Johan Nyström (athlete) =

Swedish long-distance runner

Johan Ferdinand Nyström (April 16, 1874, in Håtuna – September 30, 1968, in Tierp) was a Swedish track and field athlete who competed at the 1900 Summer Olympics in Paris, France. Nyström competed in the marathon. He was one of six runners who failed to finish the event.
