= Harvey Lord =

American sprinter (1878–1920)

Harvey Hurd Lord (August 13, 1878 in Evanston, Illinois – May 3, 1920 in Chicago, Illinois) was an American track and field athlete who competed at the 1900 Summer Olympics in Paris, France.

Lord competed in the 400 metres. He placed third in his first-round (semifinals) heat and did not advance to the final. He also competed in the 800 metres, again finishing third in his semifinal heat to not advance to the final.

His daughter is the writer Eda Lord.
