= Emile Laurent =

- Laurent (top left) in 1901

Personal information
- Nationality: France
- Born: 19th-century
- Died: 20th-century

Sport
- Sport: Long distance running
- Event: 5000 metres
- Club: Etendard Athlétique de Paris
Medal record
Men's athletics
Representing France
Summer Olympics
Second place	1900 Paris	5,000 metres (professionals)

Emile Laurent was a French professional long distance runner. He was a member of Etendard Athlétique de Paris in Paris.

He represented the French team at the 1900 Summer Olympics in the 5000 metres for professions, which won the silver medal. His achievement was rediscovered in 2023 by Olympic historians.
