= Denis Carey (athlete) =

Irish hammer thrower (1872–1947)

Personal information
- Born: 6 August 1872 Limerick, Ireland
- Died: 1 March 1947 (aged 74) Dublin, Ireland

Sport
- Sport: Athletics
- Event: Hammer throw
- Club: Dublin Metropolitan Police

Denis Carey (6 August 1872 – 1 March 1947) was an Irish track and field athlete who competed for the United Kingdom of Great Britain and Ireland in the 1912 Summer Olympics.

== Biography ==
Carey born in Limerick, became the British champion in the hammer throw after winning the AAA Championships title at the 1893 AAA Championships.

Carey was still throwing at elite level 20 years after his first AAA title and finished second behind Tom Nicolson in the hammer event at the 1912 AAA Championships.

Shortly after the 1912 AAA Championships, he finished sixth in the hammer throw competition at the 1912 Summer Olympics in Stockholm, Sweden.

Carey finished third behind Swede Carl Johan Lind in the hammer event at the 1914 AAA Championships.

Carey's remarkable career continued after war and the Irishman finished third in both the 56lb weight throw and hammer events at the 1920 AAA Championships.
