= Christian Christensen (runner) =

Danish middle-distance runner

Christian August Christensen
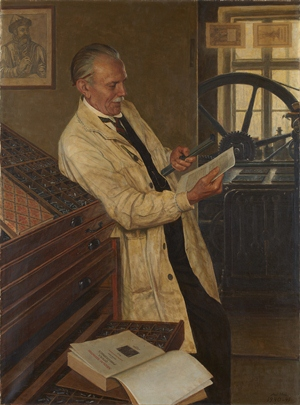
- Portrait by Axel Hou, 1914.
- Born: 6 August 1876; Copenhagen, Denmark
- Died: 5 December 1956 (aged 80); Søllerød, Denmark

Christian August Christensen (6 August 1876 in Copenhagen – 5 December 1956 in Søllerød) was a Danish book printer and track and field athlete. He competed at the 1900 Summer Olympics in Paris, France. He was a member of Københavns Idræts Forening and served as the club's president from 1903–1905 and from 1916–1918.

== Athletic career ==
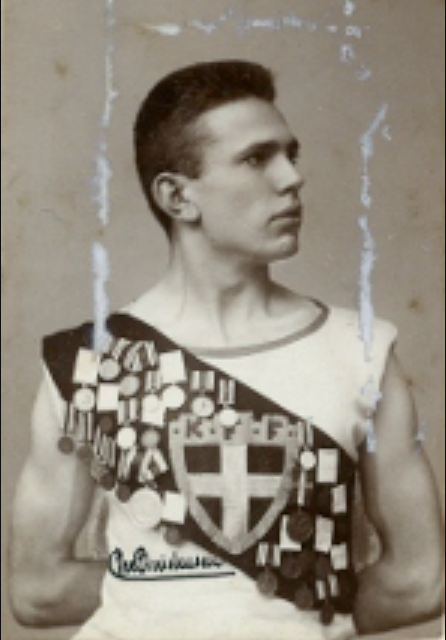
Christensen photographed by Hans Rønnow.

Christensen was one of 13 athletes to compete for Denmark at the 1900 Summer Olympics, where he competed in several track and field events. In the 800 meter event he placed 5th in his heat and did not advance to the finals. In the 1500 meter event he placed fifth out of 9 competitors.
