= Otto Bruno Schoenfeld =

German all-round sportsman

- Born: Otto Bruno Schoenfeld; August 27, 1871; Leipzig, German Empire
- Died: August 26, 1938 (aged 66); New Orleans, Louisiana, U.S.
- Occupation: Athletics coach
- Spouse: Clara Mary Walet
- Children: 4

Otto Bruno Schoenfeld (August 27, 1871 – August 26, 1938) was an all-round sportsman, competing at fencing, wrestling and boxing. Born in 1871 in Leipzig, Germany, he came to the United States as a boy, his family originally settling in Milwaukee, Wisconsin. By the time of his death he was known as 'one of the mightiest amateur athletes of all time'.

== Athletic career ==
Schoenfeld performing a high jump in 1900

He was an all-round sportsman, competing in fencing, wrestling and boxing.

Fencing In April 1900 he made his way, unsponsored, to the Exposition Universelle (World's Fair), where he won the world fencing championship. Some months later he competed at the 1900 Summer Olympics for the United States in masters sabre.

High jump Schoenfeld competed in a professionals-only event at the 1900 Summer Olympics, coming second to Mike Sweeney.

Long jump He also competed in a professionals-only long jump, again finishing behind Sweeney in second place. As Schoenfeld was a strict amateur it is unclear why he competed in this event.

Wrestling In wrestling he is best known for fighting Tom Jenkins (twice), Frank Gotch and Charlie Olsen.

Boxing As a boxer he fought Kid McCoy, knocking him down but eventually losing the bout.

== Post-Olympic career ==
Around 1903 he set up Professor Schoenfeld's Gymnasium and Fencing Academy at 143 Baronne Street, New Orleans.

== Personal life ==
Schoenfeld married Clara Mary Walet in 1903. They had four children - three sons, Otto Bruno Jr, Eugene Morris, Dr Lawrence D., and one daughter, Clara Walet (later Watters). Eugene was also a prominent athlete, but unlike his father he fought professionally; in order that his father didn't find out he competed under the name Jim Feld.
