= Justus Scrafford =

American middle-distance runner

Justus Moak Scrafford (January 7, 1878, in Washington Mills, New York – February 6, 1947, in Syracuse, New York) was an American track and field athlete who competed at the 1900 Summer Olympics in Paris, France.

Scrafford competed in the 800 metres. He placed third in his first-round (semifinals) heat and did not advance to the final.

He was also a member of the Philadelphia Relay Team of 1901 along with Harry L. Gardner, Foster S. Post, and Myer Prinstein, the captain of the team.
