= Guillaume de Saint-Cyr =

French athlete

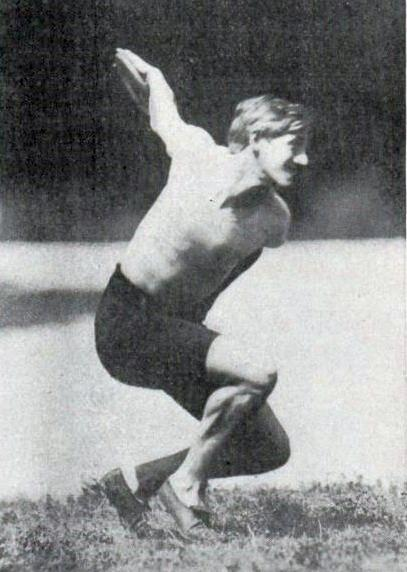
- Saint Cyr in 1897

Personal information
- Place of birth: France
- Position: Midfielder

Senior career*
Years	Team	Apps	(Gls)
1896–1897	Racing Club de France		
Sports career
Sport	Discus throw and high jump
Club	Racing Club de France (1896–98); Red Star (1898–1900)
Medal record Representing France French Athletics Championships: Gold medal – first place / 1896 / High jump; Gold medal – first place / 1897 / Discus throw
- * Club domestic league appearances and goals

Guillaume de Saint-Cyr was a French athlete who represented Racing Club de France in the 1890s, being a French champion in the high jump (1896) and discus throw (1897).

== Sporting career ==
=== Athletics ===
Very little is known about his early and personal life, but he is most likely a brother to Charles de Saint-Cyr as they both practiced sports at Racing Club de France (RCF), and then Red Star in the late 1890s. Saint-Cyr represented the RCF in four consecutive French Athletics Championships between 1895 and 1898; in the first two, he only participated in the high jump, finishing second in 1895, and then becoming French champion in 1896, doing so with a jump of 1.66 meters, thus setting a new national record in France, which was broken two years later by Frédéric Combemale (1.67 meters). In doing so, he became only the third Racing athlete to win gold in high jump, after the American W.H. Taber in 1892 and Combemale in 1893, who won again in 1898.

In the Athletics Championships of 1897 and 1898, Saint-Cyr competed in three different sports, the high jump, the 400 meters, and the discus throw, becoming the 1897 French champion of the latter with a throw of 29.15 meters, and in doing so, he became the first Racing athlete to win gold in the discus throw. A few days after the completion, he established the national record with a throw of 29.94 meters. He then joined Red Star, which he represented at the 1899 Athletics Championships, where he again competed in three different sports, finishing second in shot put (10.995 meters) and discus throw (31.32 meters). He participated in a further three discus throw events between 1900 and 1902, finishing third on the latter occasion.

At the 1900 Olympic Games in Paris, Saint-Cyr competed in the handicap events of 400 meters and shot put, finishing third on the latter with a throw of 12.67 meters.

=== Football ===
Saint-Cyr also played football with Racing's football team as early as January 1897, when he started as a midfielder against United Sports Club (1–1). Three months later, on 4 April, Saint-Cyr was replaced for Racing's last match in the 1897 USFSA championship, which ended in a loss to CP Asnières.
