= David Hall (runner) =

American middle-distance runner (1875–1972)

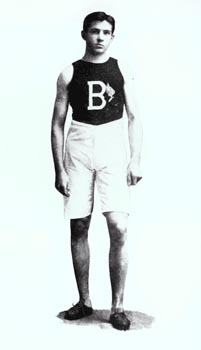

Biographical details
- Born: May 1, 1875; Sherbrooke, Quebec, Canada
- Died: May 27, 1972 (aged 97); Seattle, Washington, U.S.
- Education: Brown University; University of Chicago; Rush Medical College

Playing career

Track and field
- 1899–1901: Brown

Coaching career (HC unless noted)

Basketball
- 1907–1908: Oklahoma
- 1908–1910: Washington

Track and field
- 1909–1910: Washington
- 1912–1914: Washington

Head coaching record
- Overall: 27–10 (.730) (basketball)
Medal record
Men's athletics
Representing the United States
Olympic Games
Bronze medal – third place	1900 Paris	800 metres

David Connolly Hall (May 1, 1875 – May 27, 1972) was an American track athlete, track and basketball coach, and university professor. He served as the head basketball coach at University of Oklahoma from 1907 to 1908 and at University of Washington from 1908 to 1910.

He was born in Sherbrooke, Quebec, Canada and died in Seattle. He won the bronze medal in the 800 metres track and field race at the 1900 Summer Olympics in Paris. His time in the final is unknown. The race was won by Alfred Tysoe, who had taken second in the preliminary heat which Hall had won with a time of 1:59.0. Hall also competed in the 1500 metres at the 1900 Olympics, placing fourth.

== Athletic career ==
Hall attended Brown University, where he became a champion runner and was the captain of the track and field team from 1899 to 1901.

== Coaching and academic career ==
After graduating from Brown, Hall became the basketball coach at the University of Oklahoma supervise men's athletics at school. He graduated from the University of Chicago and Rush Medical College. He was also a medical doctor and became a physical instructor at Washington. He served as the head track and field coach at Washington from 1909 to 1910 and 1912 to 1914.

== Head coaching record ==
=== Basketball ===
Record table
Season	Team	Overall	Conference	Standing	Postseason
Oklahoma Sooners (Independent) (1907–1908)
1907–08	Oklahoma	4–3			
Oklahoma:		4–3 (.571)			
Washington Huskies (Independent) (1908–1910)
1908–09	Washington	9–1			
1909–10	Washington	14–6			
Washington:		23–7 (.767)			
Total:		27–10 (.730)			
