= Émile Champion =

French long-distance runner (1879–1934)

Medal record

Men's athletics
Silver medal – second place	1900 Paris	Marathon

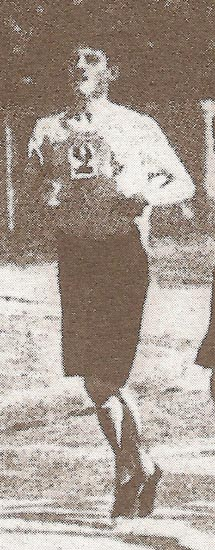
Émile Champion 1900.

Émile Adolphe Eugène Champion (August 7, 1879 in Laval, Mayenne – 4 August 1934 in Bordeaux) was a French track and field athlete, born in Paris, who competed in the early 20th century. He was a long-distance runner but specialized in the marathon and won a silver medal in Athletics at the 1900 Summer Olympics in Paris.
