= Umberto Colombo (athlete) =

Italian sprinter

Personal information
- Nationality: Italian
- Born: 1880 Brembate di Sopra, Italy
- Died: unknown

Sport
- Country: Italy
- Sport: Athletics
- Event: Sprint
- Club: Mediolanum Milano

Achievements and titles
- Personal best: 100 m: 11.0 (1898)

Umberto Colombo (born in 1880, date of death unknown) was an Italian sprinter. Domestically, he represented the sports club Mediolanum Milano. In 1898, he won all eighteen major races he entered, such as the Italian National Championships and became noticed in the country.

Colombo then represented Italy at the 1900 Summer Olympics as the first Italian sprinter to compete at a Summer Games. There, he competed in the men's 100 metres and men's 400 metres but did not advance to the semifinals of either event. He was also entered in three other events, but did not compete in them. After the 1900 Summer Games, he continued the sport until his retirement in 1904.

== Biography ==
Umberto Colombo was born in 1880 in Brembate di Sopra, Italy. Domestically, he represented the sports club Mediolanum Milano. While he was competing, he became noticed in the country in 1898 after he had won all eighteen major races he entered such as the Italian National Championships in Turin.

Colombo then represented Italy at the 1900 Summer Olympics in Paris, France, as the first Italian sprinter to compete at an Olympic Games. He was entered in the men's long jump, men's 110 metres hurdles, and men's 200 metres hurdles, but did not compete in any. Instead, he competed in the men's 100 metres and men's 400 metres.

For the former, he competed in the heats on 14 July against three other competitors. There, he was placed third and did not advance to the semifinals. He then competed in the heats of the latter on the same day against four other competitors. There, he was placed either fourth or fifth and again did not advance to the semifinals of the event. After the 1900 Summer Games, he continued to compete until his retirement in 1904 at the age of 24.

== See also ==
- Italy at the 1900 Summer Olympics
