= Edward Bushnell =

American distance runner (1876–1951)

Personal information
- Nationality: American
- Born: December 5, 1876 Republican City, Nebraska, U.S.
- Died: January 5, 1951 (aged 74) Moorestown, New Jersey, U.S.
- Resting place: West Laurel Hill Cemetery, Bala Cynwyd, Pennsylvania, U.S.

Sport
- Sport: Track and field
- Event: Men's 800 meters

Edward Rogers Bushnell (December 5, 1876 - January 5, 1951) was an American track and field athlete who competed at the 1900 Summer Olympics in Paris, France.

== Early life and education ==
He was born in Republican City, Nebraska, to Methodist missionaries. He attended Hastings College in Nebraska and transferred to the University of Pennsylvania at the beginning of his junior year in 1899. He competed in varsity track and Cross country running and served as captain of the Cross country running team his senior year. In 1900, he won the mile run at the Intercollegiate Championship. He worked as a campus correspondent for The Philadelphia Press. In 1901, he graduated from the University of Pennsylvania with a Bachelor of Science degree and from Hastings College with a bachelor of arts degree.

== Olympics ==
Bushnell competed in the 800 metres and finished between fourth and sixth place. He finished third in the 2500 meter steeple chase which was considered a handicap event that year and not included in the official Olympic records.

He worked as the official photographer for the United States Olympic team during the 1908 Olympic Games.

== Later life ==
He worked for 15 years as an editorial writer for The North American and The Evening Public Ledger. He published a book, A History of Athletics at Penn in 1908 and another book Athletic Training along with Penn coach Mike Murphy. In 1916, he focused on campus publications at the University of Pennsylvania including the Franklin Field Illustrated and Old Penn. From 1918 to 1921, he worked as graduate manager of athletics at the university. In 1919, he rebranded the Old Penn publication to The Pennsylvania Gazette and worked there until 1928.

He died in Moorestown, New Jersey, on January 5, 1951, and was interred at West Laurel Hill Cemetery in Bala Cynwyd, Pennsylvania.
