= Howard Hayes (athlete) =

American distance runner

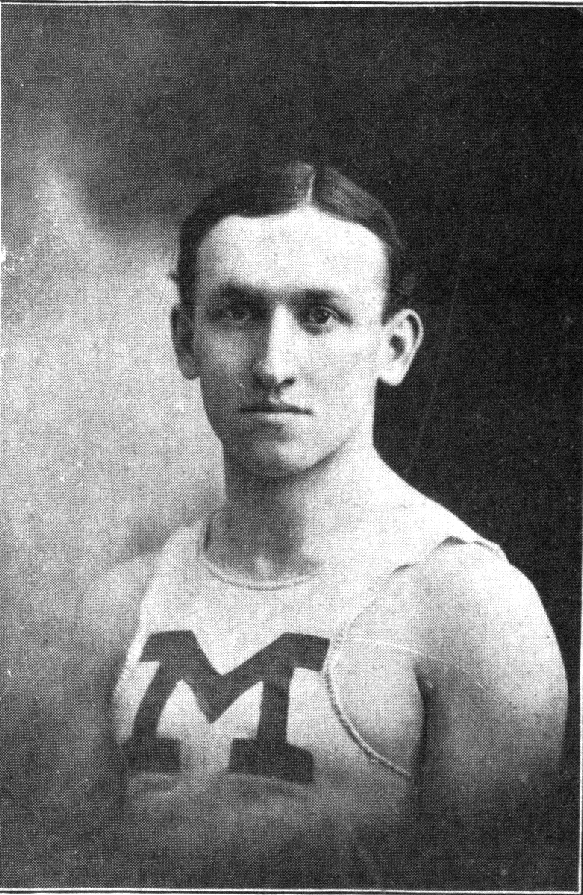
- Howard Hayes, 1900

Personal information
- Born: 30 October 1877 Steubenville, Ohio, U.S.
- Died: August 30, 1937 (aged 59) Chicago, Illinois, U.S.

Howard Wood Hayes (October 30, 1877 in Steubenville, Ohio – August 30, 1937 in Chicago, Illinois) was an American track and field athlete who competed at the 1900 Summer Olympics in Paris, France. He also competed in intercollegiate track for the University of Michigan.

In 1923, Hayes was an unsuccessful Republican nominee for a seat on the Superior Court of Cook County. He finished twenty-first place in the election, and only the first twenty finishers were elected to the court.

Hayes competed in the 800 metres. He placed third in his first-round (semifinals) heat and did not advance to the final.

After his athletic career, he became a judge on the Municipal Court of Chicago, where he pursued a 1920 contempt of court proceeding against a man who telephoned him to ask to have a case decided in the man's favor, which he believed to be the first of its kind involving the technology of telephones (as opposed to, e.g., writing a letter or having a face-to-face conversation).

Hayes died in 1937, at the age of 59. The cause of death was suicide.
