= William Moloney =

American sprinter

William Arthur Moloney (July 10, 1876 in Ottawa, Illinois – March 12, 1915 in Chicago, Illinois) was an American track and field athlete who competed at the 1900 Summer Olympics in Paris, France.

Moloney competed in the 400 metres. He finished tied for fourth overall in the event. He had won his first-round semifinal heat with a time of 51.0 seconds, but was one of three Americans who refused to take part in the final because it was held on a Sunday.

His brother Frederick also competed in the 1900 Olympics.

He died from heart disease in Chicago on March 12, 1915.
