= Wally Mendelson =

New Zealand cricketer and rugby union player

Personal information
- Full name: Wallingford Mendelson
- Born: 29 December 1872; Geraldine, Canterbury, New Zealand
- Died: 19 August 1902 (aged 29); Durban, Colony of Natal

Domestic team information
- Years: Team
- 1893-94: Canterbury

Career statistics
Competition	First-class
Matches	1
Runs scored	7
Batting average	7.00
100s/50s	0/0
Top score	7
Catches/stumpings	0/–
- Source: Cricinfo, 11 January 2020

Wallingford Mendelson (29 December 1872 – 19 August 1902) was a New Zealand cricketer, rugby player and athlete of the 1890s, who became a lawyer.

== Life and career ==
Wally Mendelson was one of several children of Julius Mendelson, who was the first postmaster in Temuka, in the South Canterbury region, in 1869. He was educated at Christ's College, Christchurch, and the University of Otago, where he graduated with a BA in 1892. A batsman, he played one first-class match for Canterbury in 1893-94. He won the New Zealand long jump championship in 1893.

He then studied law at Jesus College, Cambridge. He played rugby for Cambridge, winning his Blue in 1894, 1895 and 1896. He also won an athletics Blue in 1895, when he defeated Oxford University's champion athlete C. B. Fry in the long jump. He was admitted to the Bar at the Inner Temple in 1897.

Mendelson returned to New Zealand and practised law in Temuka, where he was an influential player and administrator in cricket and rugby in the South Canterbury region. Opening the batting for South Canterbury against Canterbury in a two-day match in December 1899 he scored 26 not out, carrying his bat in a total of 44 all out.

He moved to the Colony of Natal in May 1902, intending to live in South Africa permanently, but he contracted myelitis and died in hospital in Durban a few weeks after arriving.
