= Maxie Long =

American sprinter (1878–1959)

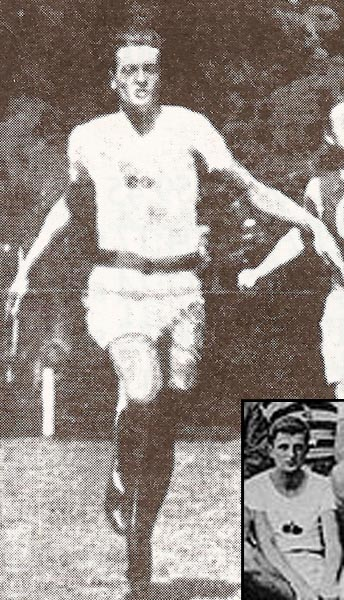
- Maxie Long, 1900

Personal information
- Nationality: American
- Born: October 16, 1878 Waverley, Massachusetts
- Died: March 4, 1959 (aged 80) New York, New York

Sport
- Sport: Track and field
- Event: Sprints
Medal record
Men's athletics
Representing the United States
Olympic Games
| Gold medal – first place | 1900 Paris | 400 metres |

Maxwell Washburn Long (October 16, 1878 – March 4, 1959) was an American athlete, winner of 400 m at the 1900 Summer Olympics.

== Biography ==
Long won three AAU titles from 1898 to 1900 and IC4A title in 1899 in 440 yd (402 m), 1899 an AAU title in 220 yd (201 m) and 1900 an AAU title in 100 yd (91 m). He also won the British AAA Championships title at the 1900 AAA Championships.

Maxie Long from Columbia University, was one of the top favorites for the Olympic title in Paris and at the 1900 Summer Olympics, Long led the 400 metres race from start to finish, beating his teammate William Holland at 3 yards (2.7 m). Long competed wearing Columbia University’s blue-and-white striped uniform, which inadvertently led French spectators to mistake him for a local athlete and cheer him on.

Later that year, Long clocked 47.8 s for 440 yd (402 m) in a handicap race - an effort retroactively ratified by the IAAF as the first official world record for the 400 m. Shortly thereafter, he ran 47.0 s on a straight course, though not officially recognised due to course configuration. In 1901 he finished second behind Reginald Wadsley in the 440 yards event at the 1901 AAA Championships.

In 2021 he was elected into the National Track and Field Hall of Fame.
