= John Bray (athlete) =

American athlete (1875–1945)

Olympic medal record

Men's athletics

Representing the United States
Bronze medal – third place	1900 Paris	1500 metres

John Bray (August 19, 1875 in Middleport, New York – July 18, 1945 in San Francisco, California) was an American athlete.

He won the bronze medal over 1500 m at the Olympic Games in Paris in 1900, finishing in a time of 4:07.2. Bray also participated in the 800 metre competition and finished sixth.
