= Henri Deloge =

French middle-distance runner

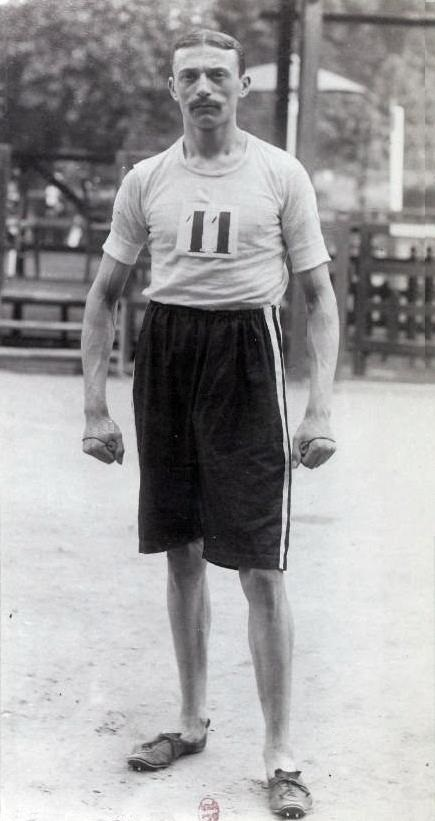

Personal information
- Born: 21 November 1874 Saint-Mandé, Val-de-Marne, France
- Died: 327 December 1961 (aged 87) Bourg-la-Reine, Hauts-de-Seine, France

Sport
- Event: middle-distance
- Club: Racing Club de France, Paris
Medal record
Men's athletics
Representing France
Olympic Games
| Silver medal – second place | 1900 Paris | 1500 metres |
| Silver medal – second place | 1900 Paris | 5000 metres team race |

Henri Léon Émile Deloge (21 November 1874 in Saint-Mandé – 27 December 1961 in Bourg-la-Reine) was a French middle-distance runner who won a silver medal over 1500m in Athletics at the 1900 Summer Olympics in Paris.

== Biography ==
In the Olympic final, Deloge won the silver medal ahead of John Bray. The race was won by Charles Bennett who won the gold medal. He also won the silver medal in the 5000 metres team race for the French distance team.

Deloge also placed fourth in the 800 metres, after winning his semifinal heat with a time of 2:00.6. A repeat of that time would have won the final, but Deloge placed fourth instead with an unknown time (but one greater than 2:03.0, the silver medalist's time).

The following year in 1901, Deloge finished third in the 1 mile event at the British 1901 AAA Championships.
