= Bill Holland (sprinter) =

American athlete

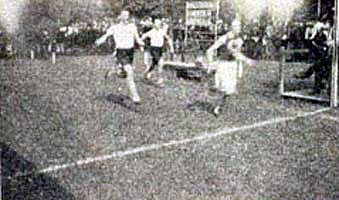

Medal record

Men's athletics

Representing the United States

Olympic Games
Silver medal – second place	1900 Paris	400 m

William Joseph Holland (March 3, 1874 in Boston, Massachusetts – November 20, 1930 in Malden, Massachusetts) was an American track and field athlete.

At the age of 26, Holland, a medical student at Georgetown University, won the silver medal in the men's 400-meter dash race at the 1900 Summer Olympics, in Paris, France, with a time of 49.6 seconds, just 2 tenth of a second behind Gold medal winner U.S. teammate Maxie Long.

Holland placed fourth in the 200-meter dash, winning his semifinal heat with a time of 24.0 seconds before finishing fourth of four in the hotly contested final, in which his estimated time of 22.9 seconds was identical to that of the bronze medalist Stan Rowley and 0.1 seconds slower than the second place man, Norman Pritchard. Holland also competed in the 60-meter dash event, placing third in his first-round heat and not advancing to the final.
