= Jean Chastanié =

French athlete (1875–1948)

Olympic medal record

Men's athletics

Representing France
Silver medal – second place	1900 Paris	5000 metre team race
Bronze medal – third place	1900 Paris	2500 metre steeplechase

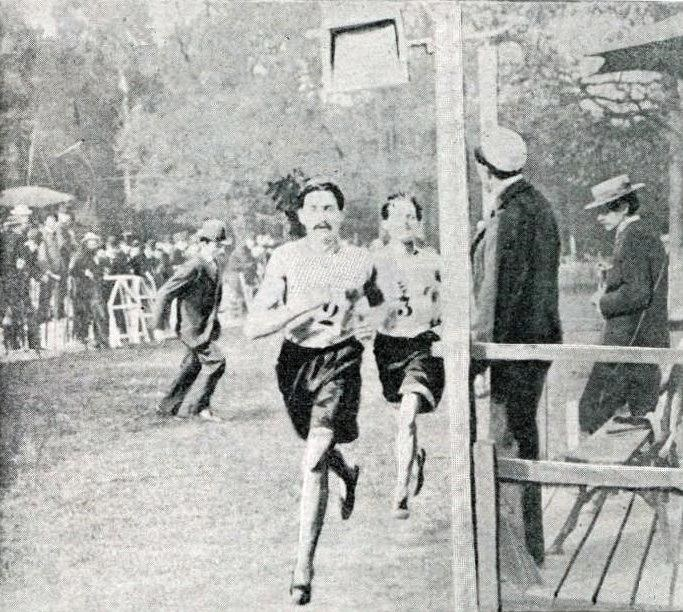

Jean Chastanié (24 July 1875 in Lorient – 14 April 1948 in Paris) was an early twentieth century French middle-distance athlete who specialized in 2500 metres steeplechase. He participated in Athletics at the 1900 Summer Olympics in Paris and won the bronze medal in the 2500 metre event. He also won the silver medal in the 5000 metre team race for the French distance team, as well as taking fourth place in the 4000 metre steeplechase.
