= Gaston Ragueneau =

French athlete

Olympic medal record

Men's athletics

Representing France
Silver medal – second place	1900 Paris	5000 metres team race

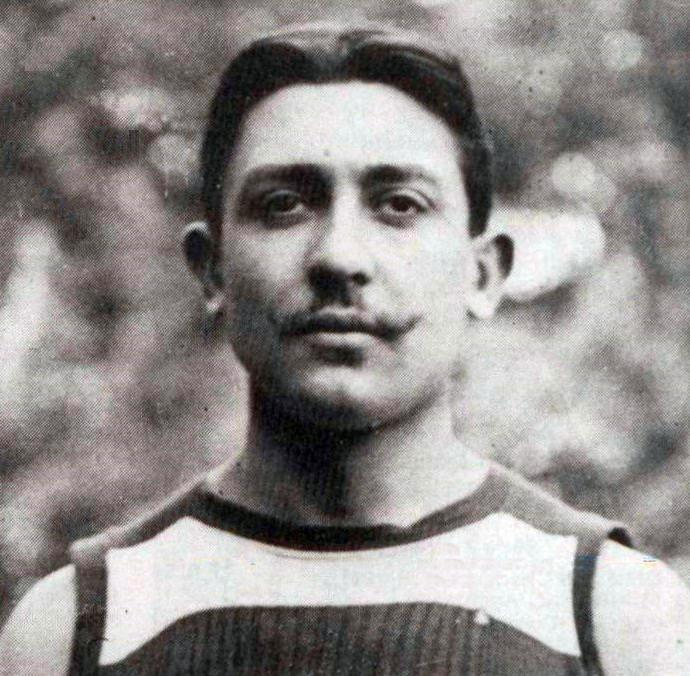
Gaston Ragueneau

Adolphe Gaston Ragueneau (10 October 1881 in Lyon – 14 July 1978 in Draveil) was a French athlete. He competed at the 1900 Summer Olympics in Paris and the 1908 Summer Olympics in London.

== Career ==
In 1900, Ragueneau won a silver medal with the French team in the 5000 metre team race. He finished fourth of the ten men in the race, behind two British runners and teammate Henri Deloge, on the way to a 26–29 loss to the British team.

In the 1908 Olympics, Ragueneau competed in the 1500 metres but did not finish his initial semifinal heat and did not advance to the final.
