= Denis Horgan =

Irish shot putter

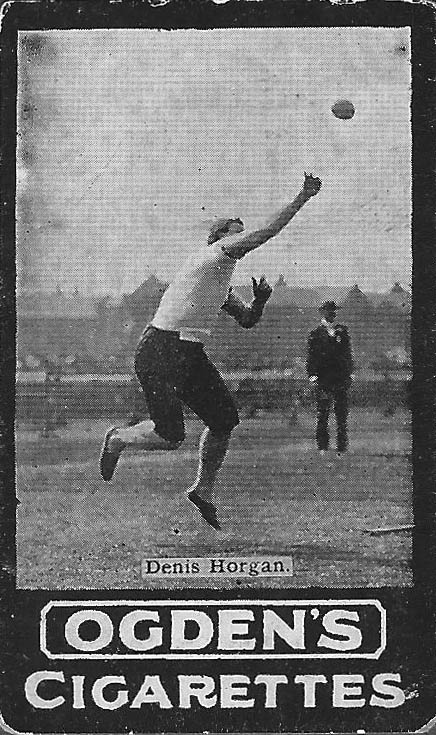
- Horgan depicted on an Ogden's cigarette card, 1902

Personal information
- Born: 18 May 1871 Banteer, County Cork
- Died: 2 June 1922 (aged 51) Crookstown, Cork

Sport
- Sport: Athletics
- Event: Shot put
Medal record
Representing Great Britain
Men's athletics
Silver medal – second place	1908 London	Shot put

Denis Horgan (18 May 1871 – 2 June 1922) was a champion Irish athlete and weight thrower, born in Banteer, County Cork, who competed mainly in the shot put.

== Biography ==
Shortly after setting a world record of 48 feet 2 inches with the 16 pound shot at Queenstown, in County Cork, Ireland in 1897, Horgan visited the U.S., and in 1900, he joined the Greater New York Irish Athletic Association, the predecessor of the Irish American Athletic Club for a brief period. In 1905, he joined the rival New York Athletic Club.

In 1906, Horgan set the world's record for the 28 pound shot, with a distance of 35 feet, 4.5 inches at the Ancient Order of Hibernians games held at Celtic Park in Queens, New York.

He competed for Great Britain at the 1908 Summer Olympics in London in the shot put, where he won the silver medal.

Horgan won 13 British AAA Championships titles from 1893 to 1912. The win at the 1893 AAA Championships was the first of seven consecutive shot put titles.

Horgan won a total 42 shot put titles during his athletic career, including 28 Irish championships, and one American championship. Horgan was "usually so superior to his fellow competitors that he seldom trained in any sort of systematic way, yet he showed a marked consistency of performance, in all conditions, over a period of twenty years."

He emigrated to America, where he worked as a police officer. Whilst attempting to rescue a fellow Irishman, he was severely stabbed and left for dead. After he recovered, he returned to Ireland, married, and settled in Crookstown.
