= Alexander Grant (athlete) =

American track and field athlete

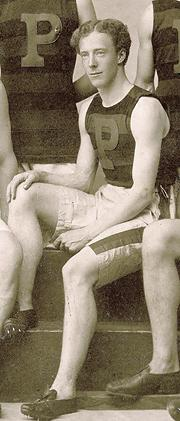

Personal information
- Born: April 16, 1875 St. Marys, Ontario, Canada
- Died: October 13, 1946 (aged 71) Narberth, Pennsylvania, U.S.

Sport
- Sport: Athletics
- Event: middle-distance running
- Club: Penn Quakers, Philadelphia

Alexander Grant (April 16, 1875 – October 13, 1946) was a Canadian/American track and field athlete who competed at the 1900 Summer Olympics in Paris, France.

== Biography ==
Grant born in St. Marys, Ontario, Canada, finished third in the British 1 mile 1900 AAA Championships.

Shortly afterwards, Grant competed in the 800 metres. He placed sixth or seventh in his first-round (semifinals) heat and did not advance to the final.

He did not participate in the 4000 metre steeplechase.

He graduated from the University of Pennsylvania in 1900. Grant then dominated American distance running, as the national champion in the 1500 meter race from 1901 to 1903, the 5000 meter event in 1903 and 1904, the 10000 meter event in 1902 as well as the 3000 meter steeplechase in 1900. His record time in the 1500 meter event went unbroken in the U.S. for twenty years and in the world for ten years.

He then went on to become a teacher at the Berkley School in New York, Detroit University, The Hill School in Pottstown, Pennsylvania, and then from 1914 on, at Episcopal Academy.

Grant, along with George Orton and Josiah MacCracken, founded Camp Tecumseh, an all-boys summer camp in Moultonboro, New Hampshire. The camp opened in 1903. Grant continued as director of Camp Tecumseh until his death in 1946. After Grant's death, Camp Tecumseh became a not-for-profit organization run by a board of trustees. In 2003, Camp Tecumseh celebrated its 100th birthday. The camp continues to be very successful, adhering to Grant's vision of "making good boys better."

Grant died in Narberth, PA. on October 13, 1946. He was the brother of Olympian Dick Grant.
