= John Cregan (athlete) =

American middle-distance runner

Jan Brasser
Personal information
- Born: January 29, 1878 Schenectady, New York, U.S.
- Died: December 26, 1965 (aged 77) Philadelphia, Pennsylvania, U.S.

Sport
- Sport: Athletics
- Event: middle-distance running
- Club: Princeton Tigers
Medal record
Men's athletics
Representing the United States
Silver medal – second place	1900 Paris	800 metres

John Francis Cregan (January 29, 1878 – December 26, 1965) was an early twentieth century American athlete who specialised in the 800 metres.

== Biography ==
Creagn born in Schenectady, New York, attended Princeton University. He finished second in the 880 yards at the British 1900 AAA Championships.

Creagn participated in Athletics at the 1900 Summer Olympics in Paris and won the silver medal in the men's 800 metres event. He died in Philadelphia.
