= United States at the 1900 Summer Olympics =

- Flag of the United States in 1900
- IOC code: USA
- NOC: United States Olympic Committee

in Paris
- Competitors: 75 in 10 sports
- Medals Ranked 2nd: Gold 20 Silver 13 Bronze 15 Total 48

Summer Olympics appearances (overview)
- 1896; 1900; 1904; 1908; 1912; 1920; 1924; 1928; 1932; 1936; 1948; 1952; 1956; 1960; 1964; 1968; 1972; 1976; 1980; 1984; 1988; 1992; 1996; 2000; 2004; 2008; 2012; 2016; 2020; 2024; 2028

Other related appearances
- 1906 Intercalated Games

The United States competed at the 1900 Summer Olympics in Paris, France.

Athletes at the early Olympic Games (1896, 1900, and 1904) are attributed by the International Olympic Committee (IOC) according to the national affiliation of their club or team, rather than their nationality. (Note: In 2024, the IOC reinstated its original and current attribution policy for athletes at the early Olympic Games (1896, 1900, and 1904). From 2021 to 2024, the IOC briefly attributed medals in individual events according to the athlete's nationality, even when the athlete represented a foreign club or team. Since 2024, participation and medals have instead been attributed according to the national affiliation of the club or team represented by the athlete.)

At the 1900 Games, Canadian George Orton won a gold medal and a bronze medal in Athletics; as a representative of an American club, his results were attributed to the United States. Only the medals of two American athletes in the women's individual golf event at the 1900 Games have been attributed to a foreign country. American Pauline Whittier (silver) was affiliated with the St. Moritz Golf Club in Switzerland, while Abbie Pratt (bronze) was affiliated with the Dinard Golf Club in France; their medals were therefore attributed to Switzerland and France, respectively.

== Medalists ==
| Medal | Name | Sport | Event | |
|---|---|---|---|---|
| Gold | Frank Jarvis | Athletics | Men's 100 metres | July 14 |
| Gold | Alvin Kraenzlein | Athletics | Men's 110 metres hurdles | July 14 |
| Gold | Alvin Kraenzlein | Athletics | Men's 60 metres | July 15 |
| Gold | Maxie Long | Athletics | Men's 400 metres | July 15 |
| Gold | Walter Tewksbury | Athletics | Men's 400 metres hurdles | July 15 |
| Gold | George Orton (CAN) | Athletics | Men's 2500 metres steeplechase | July 15 |
| Gold | Alvin Kraenzlein | Athletics | Men's long jump | July 15 |
| Gold | Irving Baxter | Athletics | Men's high jump | July 15 |
| Gold | Irving Baxter | Athletics | Men's pole vault | July 15 |
| Gold | Richard Sheldon | Athletics | Men's shot put | July 15 |
| Gold | John Flanagan | Athletics | Men's hammer throw | July 16 |
| Gold | Ray Ewry | Athletics | Men's standing long jump | July 16 |
| Gold | Ray Ewry | Athletics | Men's standing triple jump | July 16 |
| Gold | Ray Ewry | Athletics | Men's standing high jump | July 16 |
| Gold | Meyer Prinstein | Athletics | Men's triple jump | July 16 |
| Gold | Walter Tewksbury | Athletics | Men's 200 metres | July 22 |
| Gold | Alvin Kraenzlein | Athletics | Men's 200 metres hurdles | July 22 |
| Gold | Vesper Boat Club: William Carr; Harry DeBaecke; John Exley; John Geiger; Edwin Hedley; James Juvenal; Roscoe Lockwood; Edward Marsh; Louis Abell (cox) | Rowing | Men's eight | August 26 |
| Gold | Charles Sands | Golf | Men's individual | October 2 |
| Gold | Margaret Ives Abbott | Golf | Women's individual | October 3 |
| Silver | Walter Tewksbury | Athletics | Men's 100 metres | July 14 |
| Silver | John McLean | Athletics | Men's 110 metres hurdles | July 14 |
| Silver | Walter Tewksbury | Athletics | Men's 60 metres | July 15 |
| Silver | William Holland | Athletics | Men's 400 metres | July 15 |
| Silver | Meredith Colket | Athletics | Men's pole vault | July 15 |
| Silver | Myer Prinstein | Athletics | Men's long jump | July 15 |
| Silver | Josiah McCracken | Athletics | Men's shot put | July 15 |
| Silver | John Cregan | Athletics | Men's 800 metres | July 16 |
| Silver | Irving Baxter | Athletics | Men's standing long jump | July 16 |
| Silver | Irving Baxter | Athletics | Men's standing triple jump | July 16 |
| Silver | Irving Baxter | Athletics | Men's standing high jump | July 16 |
| Silver | James Connolly | Athletics | Men's triple jump | July 16 |
| Silver | Truxtun Hare | Athletics | Men's hammer throw | July 16 |
| Bronze | H. MacHenry | Sailing | 3–10 ton class race 2 | May 27 |
| Bronze | Marion Jones | Tennis | Women's singles | July 11 |
| Bronze | Fred Moloney | Athletics | Men's 110 metres hurdles | July 14 |
| Bronze | George Orton (CAN) | Athletics | 400 metres hurdles | July 15 |
| Bronze | John Bray | Athletics | Men's 1500 metres | July 15 |
| Bronze | Robert Garrett | Athletics | Men's shot put | July 15 |
| Bronze | Richard Sheldon | Athletics | Men's discus throw | July 15 |
| Bronze | Josiah McCracken | Athletics | Men's hammer throw | July 16 |
| Bronze | David Hall | Athletics | Men's 800 metres | July 16 |
| Bronze | Walter Tewksbury | Athletics | Men's 200 metres hurdles | July 16 |
| Bronze | Lewis Sheldon | Athletics | Men's triple jump | July 16 |
| Bronze | Lewis Sheldon | Athletics | Men's standing high jump | July 16 |
| Bronze | Robert Garrett | Athletics | Men's standing triple jump | July 16 |
| Bronze | Harry Van Bergen | Sailing | 20+ ton class | August 2 |
| Bronze | John Lake | Cycling | Men's sprint | September 13 |

- Additionally, Foxhall Parker Keene and Frank MacKey were part of the mixed team that won the gold medal in polo.
- Additionally, Walter McCreery was part of the mixed team that won the silver medal in polo, and Basil Spalding de Garmendia won a silver medal with Max Décugis of France in men's doubles tennis.
- Additionally, Marion Jones won a bronze medal with Laurence Doherty of Great Britain in mixed doubles tennis.

== Medals reallocated from American athletes to non-American teams ==
| Medal | Name | Nationality | Affiliation | Games | Sport | Event | Reallocated to | Ref |
|---|---|---|---|---|---|---|---|---|
| Silver | Pauline Whittier | United States | SUI; St. Moritz Golf Club | 1900 Paris | Golf | Women's individual | Switzerland | |
| Bronze | Abbie Pratt | United States | FRA; Dinard Golf Club | 1900 Paris | Golf | Women's individual | France | |

== Results by event ==
=== Athletics ===
The United States team took 16 of the 23 track & field athletics medals, having competed in 22 events (all except the 5000 metre team race). The Americans failed to win a medal in only 3 of the 22 events they contested—the marathon and the two steeplechase events. Kraenzlein won four gold medals while Baxter and Tewksbury led in total medals with five each. Most of the American team did not compete at the events scheduled for Sundays.

Track and road events

| Athlete | Event | Heat | | Semifinal | | Repechage | | Final | |
| Athlete | Event | Result | Rank | Result | Rank | Result | Rank | Result | Rank |
|---|---|---|---|---|---|---|---|---|---|
| William Holland | Men's 60 metres | Unknown | 3 | —N/a | | | | did not advance | |
| Alvin Kraenzlein | Men's 60 metres | 7.0 | 1 Q | —N/a | | | | 7.0 | 1st place, gold medalist(s) |
| Edmund Minahan | Men's 60 metres | Unknown | 2 Q | —N/a | | | | 7.2 | 4 |
| Walter Tewksbury | Men's 60 metres | 7.2 | 1 Q | —N/a | | | | 7.1 | 2nd place, silver medalist(s) |
| Dixon Boardman | Men's 100 metres | Unknown | 2 Q | Unknown | 4 | did not advance | | | |
| Charles Burroughs | Men's 100 metres | 11.4 | 1 Q | Unknown | 3 R | Unknown | 4–6 | did not advance | |
| Arthur Duffey | Men's 100 metres | 11.4 | 1 Q | 11.0 | 1 Q | Bye | | DNF | 4 |
| Frank Jarvis | Men's 100 metres | 10.8 | 1 Q | 11.2 | 1 Q | Bye | | 11.0 | 1st place, gold medalist(s) |
| Clark Leiblee | Men's 100 metres | 11.4 | 1 Q | Unknown | 2 R | Unknown | 3 | did not advance | |
| Thaddeus McClain | Men's 100 metres | Unknown | 2 Q | Unknown | 2 R | Unknown | 4–6 | did not advance | |
| Edmund Minahan | Men's 100 metres | Unknown | 2 Q | Unknown | 4 | did not advance | | | |
| Frederick Moloney | Men's 100 metres | Unknown | 2 Q | Unknown | 3 R | Unknown | 4–6 | did not advance | |
| Henry Slack | Men's 100 metres | Unknown | 3 | did not advance | | | | | |
| Walter Tewksbury | Men's 100 metres | 11.4 | 1 Q | 10.8 | 1 Q | Bye | | 11.1 seconds | 2nd place, silver medalist(s) |
| William Holland | Men's 200 metres | 24.0 | 1 Q | —N/a | | | | 22.9 | 4 |
| Walter Tewksbury | Men's 200 metres | Unknown | 2 Q | —N/a | | | | 22.2 | 1st place, gold medalist(s) |
| Dixon Boardman | Men's 400 metres | 51.2 | 1 Q | —N/a | | | | DNS | – |
| Walter Drumheller | Men's 400 metres | Unknown | 5 | —N/a | | | | did not advance | |
| William Holland | Men's 400 metres | Unknown | 2 Q | —N/a | | | | 49.6 | 2nd place, silver medalist(s) |
| Harry Lee | Men's 400 metres | Unknown | 2 Q | —N/a | | | | DNS | – |
| Maxie Long | Men's 400 metres | 50.4 | 1 Q | —N/a | | | | 49.4 | 1st place, gold medalist(s) |
| Harvey Lord | Men's 400 metres | Unknown | 3 | —N/a | | | | did not advance | |
| William Moloney | Men's 400 metres | 51.0 | 1 Q | —N/a | | | | DNS | – |
| Henry Slack | Men's 400 metres | Unknown | 3 | —N/a | | | | did not advance | |
| John Bray | Men's 800 metres | Unknown | 2 Q | —N/a | | | | Unknown | 6 |
| Edward Bushnell | Men's 800 metres | Unknown | 4–6 | —N/a | | | | did not advance | |
| John Cregan | Men's 800 metres | 2:03.0 | 1 Q | —N/a | | | | 2:03.0 | 2nd place, silver medalist(s) |
| Walter Drumheller | Men's 800 metres | Unknown | 6–7 | —N/a | | | | did not advance | |
| Alexander Grant | Men's 800 metres | Unknown | 6 | —N/a | | | | did not advance | |
| David Hall | Men's 800 metres | 1:59.0 | 1 Q | —N/a | | | | Unknown | 3rd place, bronze medalist(s) |
| Howard Hayes | Men's 800 metres | Unknown | 3 | —N/a | | | | did not advance | |
| Harvey Lord | Men's 800 metres | Unknown | 3 | —N/a | | | | did not advance | |
| Edward Mechling | Men's 800 metres | Unknown | 4–5 | —N/a | | | | did not advance | |
| Justus Scrafford | Men's 800 metres | Unknown | 3 | —N/a | | | | did not advance | |
| Harrison Smith | Men's 800 metres | Unknown | 4–6 | —N/a | | | | did not advance | |
| John Bray | Men's 1500 metres | —N/a | | | | | | 4:07.2 | 3rd place, bronze medalist(s) |
| David Hall | Men's 1500 metres | —N/a | | | | | | Unknown | 4 |
| Alvin Kraenzlein | 110 metres hurdles | 15.6 | 1 Q | —N/a | | Bye | | 15.4 | 1st place, gold medalist(s) |
| William Lewis | 110 metres hurdles | Unknown | 3 R | —N/a | | Unknown | 2 | did not advance | |
| John McLean | 110 metres hurdles | Unknown | 3 R | —N/a | | 17.0 | 1 Q | 15.5 | 2nd place, silver medalist(s) |
| Frederick Moloney | 110 metres hurdles | Unknown | 2 R | —N/a | | 17.0 | 1 Q | 15.6 | 3rd place, bronze medalist(s) |
| William Remington | 110 metres hurdles | Unknown | 2 R | —N/a | | Unknown | 2 | did not advance | |
| Alvin Kraenzlein | Men's 200 metres hurdles | 27.0 | 1 Q | —N/a | | | | 25.4 | 1st place, gold medalist(s) |
| William Lewis | Men's 200 metres hurdles | Unknown | 5 | —N/a | | | | did not advance | |
| Frederick Moloney | Men's 200 metres hurdles | Unknown | 3 | —N/a | | | | did not advance | |
| Thaddeus McClain | Men's 200 metres hurdles | Unknown | 3 | —N/a | | | | did not advance | |
| William Remington | Men's 200 metres hurdles | Unknown | 4 | —N/a | | | | did not advance | |
| Walter Tewksbury | Men's 200 metres hurdles | Unknown | 2 Q | —N/a | | | | Unknown | 3rd place, bronze medalist(s) |
| William Lewis | 400 metres hurdles | Unknown | 2 Q | —N/a | | | | DNS | – |
| Walter Tewksbury | 400 metres hurdles | 1:01.0 | 1 Q | —N/a | | | | 57.6 | 1st place, gold medalist(s) |
| Arthur L. Newton | Men's 2500 metres steeplechase | —N/a | | | | | | Unknown | 4 |
| Alexander Grant | 4000 metres steeplechase | —N/a | | | | | | DNF | – |
| Thaddeus McClain | 4000 metres steeplechase | —N/a | | | | | | DNF | – |
| Dick Grant | Men's marathon | —N/a | | | | | | Unknown | 6–7 |
| Arthur L. Newton | Men's marathon | —N/a | | | | | | Unknown | 5 |

Field events

| Athlete | Event | Qualifier | | Final | |
| Athlete | Event | Result | Rank | Result | Rank |
|---|---|---|---|---|---|
| Alvin Kraenzlein | Men's long jump | 6.930 | 2 Q | 7.185 | 1st place, gold medalist(s) |
| Thaddeus McClain | Men's long jump | 6.435 | 7 | did not advance | |
| John McLean | Men's long jump | 6.655 | 6 | did not advance | |
| Meyer Prinstein | Men's long jump | 7.175 | 1 Q | 7.175 | 2nd place, silver medalist(s) |
| William Remington | Men's long jump | 6.725 | 4 Q | 6.825 | 4 |
| James Connolly | Men's triple jump | —N/a | | 13.97 | 2nd place, silver medalist(s) |
| Daniel Horton | Men's triple jump | —N/a | | Unknown | 7–13 |
| Frank Jarvis | Men's triple jump | —N/a | | Unknown | 7–13 |
| John McLean | Men's triple jump | —N/a | | Unknown | 7–13 |
| Meyer Prinstein | Men's triple jump | —N/a | | 14.47 | 1st place, gold medalist(s) |
| Lewis Sheldon | Men's triple jump | —N/a | | 13.64 | 3rd place, bronze medalist(s) |
| Irving Baxter | Men's high jump | —N/a | | 1.90 | 1st place, gold medalist(s) |
| Irving Baxter | Men's pole vault | —N/a | | 3.30 | 1st place, gold medalist(s) |
| Meredith Colket | Men's pole vault | —N/a | | 3.25 | 2nd place, silver medalist(s) |
| Irving Baxter | Men's standing long jump | —N/a | | 3.135 | 2nd place, silver medalist(s) |
| Ray Ewry | Men's standing long jump | —N/a | | 3.300 | 1st place, gold medalist(s) |
| Lewis Sheldon | Men's standing long jump | —N/a | | 3.020 | 4 |
| Irving Baxter | Men's standing triple jump | —N/a | | 9.95 | 2nd place, silver medalist(s) |
| Ray Ewry | Men's standing triple jump | —N/a | | 10.58 | 1st place, gold medalist(s) |
| Robert Garrett | Men's standing triple jump | —N/a | | 9.50 | 3rd place, bronze medalist(s) |
| Daniel Horton | Men's standing triple jump | —N/a | | Unknown | 5–10 |
| Frank Jarvis | Men's standing triple jump | —N/a | | Unknown | 5–10 |
| John McLean | Men's standing triple jump | —N/a | | Unknown | 5–10 |
| Lewis Sheldon | Men's standing triple jump | —N/a | | 9.45 | 4 |
| Ray Ewry | Men's standing high jump | —N/a | | 1.655 | 1st place, gold medalist(s) |
| Irving Baxter | Men's standing high jump | —N/a | | 1.525 | 2nd place, silver medalist(s) |
| Lewis Sheldon | Men's standing high jump | —N/a | | 1.500 | 3rd place, bronze medalist(s) |
| Robert Garrett | Men's shot put | 12.37 | 3 Q | 12.37 | 3rd place, bronze medalist(s) |
| Truxtun Hare | Men's shot put | 10.92 | 8 | did not advance | |
| Josiah McCracken | Men's shot put | 12.85 | 2 Q | 12.85 | 2nd place, silver medalist(s) |
| Richard Sheldon | Men's shot put | 13.80 | 1 Q | 14.10 | 1st place, gold medalist(s) |
| John Flanagan | Men's discus throw | 33.00 | 7 | did not advance | |
| Robert Garrett | Men's discus throw | No mark | – | did not advance | |
| Truxtun Hare | Men's discus throw | No mark | – | did not advance | |
| Josiah McCracken | Men's discus throw | 32.00 | 10 | did not advance | |
| Richard Sheldon | Men's discus throw | 34.10 | 3 Q | 34.60 | 3rd place, bronze medalist(s) |
| John Flanagan | Men's hammer throw | —N/a | | 51.01 | 1st place, gold medalist(s) |
| Truxtun Hare | Men's hammer throw | —N/a | | 46.25 | 2nd place, silver medalist(s) |
| Josiah McCracken | Men's hammer throw | —N/a | | 43.58 | 3rd place, bronze medalist(s) |

=== Cycling ===
The United States' first cycling appearance was at the second Olympic cycling competition, 1900. One cyclist from the United States competed in both events, winning the bronze medal in the 2000 metre sprint to become the only cyclist from outside France to win a medal.

==== Track ====
| Cyclist | Event | Round 1 | | Quarterfinals | | Semifinals | | Final | |
| Cyclist | Event | Result | Rank | Result | Rank | Result | Rank | Result | Rank |
|---|---|---|---|---|---|---|---|---|---|
| John Henry Lake | Men's sprint | 1:35.8 | 1 Q | 2:02.0 | 1 Q | 2:09.6 | 1 Q | Unknown | 3rd place, bronze medalist(s) |
| John Henry Lake | Men's 25 kilometres | —N/a | | | | | | DNF | – |

=== Fencing ===
The United States first competed in fencing at the Olympics in the sport's second appearance. The nation sent two fencers.

| Fencer | Event | Round 1 | | Quarterfinals | | Repechage | | Semifinals | | Final | |
| Fencer | Event | Result | Rank | Result | Rank | Result | Rank | Result | Rank | Result | Rank |
|---|---|---|---|---|---|---|---|---|---|---|---|
| F. Weill | Men's foil | Not advanced | | did not advance | | | | | | | |
| Ivan, Viscount d'Oyley | Men's épée | Unknown | 3–6 | did not advance | | —N/a | | did not advance | | | |
| Otto Bruno Schoenfeld | Men's masters sabre | Unknown | 5–8 | —N/a | | | | did not advance | | | |

=== Golf ===
The United States was one of four nations to compete in the first Olympic golf events. The Americans took both gold medals, as well as sweeping the women's competition to take 4 of 6 total medals.

| Golfer | Event | Score | Rank |
|---|---|---|---|
| Albert Lambert | Men's individual | 189 | 8 |
| Arthur Lord | Men's individual | 221 | 9 |
| Charles Sands | Men's individual | 167 | 1st place, gold medalist(s) |
| Frederick Taylor | Men's individual | 182 | 4 |
| Margaret Ives Abbott | Women's individual | 47 | 1st place, gold medalist(s) |
| Mary Abbott | Women's individual | 65 | 7 |
| Daria Pratt | Women's individual | 53 | 3rd place, bronze medalist(s) |
| Ellen Ridgway | Women's individual | 57 | 5 |
| Pauline Whittier | Women's individual | 49 | 2nd place, silver medalist(s) |

=== Polo ===
The United States was one of four nations to compete in the first Olympic polo event. Americans played on two of the five teams, each time along with British companions. The two American/British combinations won the top two prizes.

| Team | Event | Quarterfinals | Semifinals | Final | Rank |
| Team | Event | Opposition Result | Opposition Result | Opposition Result | Rank |
|---|---|---|---|---|---|
| BLO Polo Club Rugby: Walter McCreery; 3 British players | Men's polo | Bye | Mexico; W 8–0 | Foxhunters (ZZX); L 3–1 | 2nd place, silver medalist(s) |
| Foxhunters Hurlingham: Foxhall Parker Keene; Frank Mackey; 2 British players | Men's polo | Compiègne (FRA); W 10–0 | Bagatelle (ZZX); W 6–4 | Rugby (ZZX); W 3-1 | 1st place, gold medalist(s) |

=== Rowing ===
The United States had one boat at the debut of Olympic rowing; the Vesper Boat Club eight took gold.

| Boat | Event | Round 1 | | Semifinals | | Final | |
| Boat | Event | Result | Rank | Result | Rank | Result | Rank |
|---|---|---|---|---|---|---|---|
| Vesper Boat Club: William Carr; Harry DeBaecke; John Exley; John Geiger; Edwin Hedley; James Juvenal; Roscoe Lockwood; Edward Marsh; Louis Abell (cox) | Men's eight | —N/a | | 5:15.4 | 1 Q | 6:07.8 | 1st place, gold medalist(s) |

=== Sailing ===
The United States had two boats in the first Olympic sailing competitions. MacHenry's Frimousse competed in both races of the 3–10 ton class as well as the open class, Taylor is listed as a crew member for the 3–10 ton races despite owning a different boat in the competition. The bronze medal in the second race is thus often listed as a mixed team medal, as Taylor was British/Australian. Another boat, Singy, competed in the open class with unknown crew. Harry Van Bergen won a bronze medal in the individual 20+ ton class.

| Sailors | Event | Time | Rank |
|---|---|---|---|
| H. MacHenry; John Howard Taylor (GBR) | 3–10 ton class race 1 | Unknown | 7 |
| H. MacHenry; John Howard Taylor (GBR) | 3–10 ton class race 2 | 4:38:49 | 3rd place, bronze medalist(s) |
| Harry Van Bergen | 20+ ton class | 5:32:52 | 3rd place, bronze medalist(s) |
| H. MacHenry | Open class | DNF | — |
| Unknown | Open class | DNF | — |

=== Swimming ===
For the second Games, the United States had one swimmer compete and won no medals.

| Swimmer | Event | Semifinals | | Final | |
| Swimmer | Event | Result | Rank | Result | Rank |
|---|---|---|---|---|---|
| Fred Hendschel | Men's 200 metre freestyle | 3:42.0 | 3 | did not advance | |
| Fred Hendschel | Men's 200 metre obstacle event | 3:45.2 | 4 | did not advance | |

=== Tennis ===
The United States was one of four countries to compete in tennis in 1900. It was the nation's first appearance in the sport. Three men and two women competed. Marion Jones took bronze in the women's singles due to a first-round bye and a loss to gold medalist Cooper. The United States also had two medals—a silver and a bronze—as part of mixed teams.

| Player | Event | Round of 16 | Quarterfinals | Semifinals | Final | Rank |
| Player | Event | Opposition Result | Opposition Result | Opposition Result | Opposition Result | Rank |
|---|---|---|---|---|---|---|
| Basil Spalding de Garmendia | Men's singles | Voigt (USA); W 6-1, 6-3 | L. Doherty (GBR); L 6-2, 8-6 | did not advance | | 5 |
| Charles Sands | Men's singles | Mahony (GBR); L 6-2, 6-3 | did not advance | | | 8 |
| Charles Voigt | Men's singles | de Garmendia (USA); L 6-1, 6-3 | did not advance | | | 8 |
| Georgina Jones | Women's singles | —N/a | H. Prévost (FRA); L 6-0, 6-1 | did not advance | | 5 |
| Marion Jones | Women's singles | —N/a | Bye | Cooper (GBR); L 6-2, 7-5 | Did not advance | 3rd place, bronze medalist(s) |
| Basil Spalding de Garmendia; Max Décugis (FRA) | Men's doubles | —N/a | Sands (USA)/ Warden (GBR); W 6-3, 7-5 | de la Chapelle/A. Prévost (FRA); W 6-2, 6-4 | L. Doherty/R. Doherty (GBR); L 6-1, 6-1, 6-0 | 2nd place, silver medalist(s) |
| Charles Sands; Archibald Warden (GBR) | Men's doubles | —N/a | de Garmendia (USA)/ Décugis (FRA); L 6-3, 7-5 | did not advance | | 5 |
| Marion Jones; Laurence Doherty (GBR) | Mixed doubles | —N/a | G. Jones/Sands (USA); W 6-1, 7-5 | Cooper/R. Doherty (GBR); L 6-2, 6-4 | Did not advance | 3rd place, bronze medalist(s) |
| Charles Sands; Georgina Jones | Mixed doubles | —N/a | M. Jones (USA)/ L. Doherty (GBR); L 6-1, 7-5 | did not advance | | 5 |
