= Hungary at the 1900 Summer Olympics =

- IOC code: HUN
- NOC: Hungarian Olympic Committee

in Paris
- Competitors: 17 in 4 sports
- Medals Ranked 11th: Gold 1 Silver 2 Bronze 2 Total 5

Summer Olympics appearances (overview)
- 1896; 1900; 1904; 1908; 1912; 1920; 1924; 1928; 1932; 1936; 1948; 1952; 1956; 1960; 1964; 1968; 1972; 1976; 1980; 1984; 1988; 1992; 1996; 2000; 2004; 2008; 2012; 2016; 2020; 2024

Other related appearances
- 1906 Intercalated Games

Hungary competed at the 1900 Summer Olympics in Paris, France. Austrian and Hungarian results at early Olympic Games are generally kept separate despite the union of the two nations as Austria-Hungary at the time.

== Medalists ==
The following Hungarian competitors won medals at the games. In the discipline sections below, the medalists' names are bolded.

Medal	Name	Sport	Event	Date
Gold	Rudolf Bauer	Athletics	Men's discus throw	15 July
Silver	Zoltán Halmay	Swimming	Men's 200 metre freestyle	12 August
Silver	Zoltán Halmay	Swimming	Men's 4000 metre freestyle	19 August
Bronze	Lajos Gönczy	Athletics	Men's high jump	15 July
Bronze	Zoltán Halmay	Swimming	Men's 1000 metre freestyle	12 August

Medals by sport
**Sport**	1st place, gold medalist(s)	2nd place, silver medalist(s)	3rd place, bronze medalist(s)	**Total**
Athletics	1	0	1	**2**
Swimming	0	2	1	**3**
Total	1	2	2	5

=== Multiple medalists ===
The following competitors won multiple medals at the 1900 Olympic Games.

Name	Medal	Sport	Event
Zoltán Halmay	Silver; Silver; Bronze	Swimming	Men's 200 m freestyle Men's 4000 m freestyle Men's 1000 m freestyle

== Competitors ==
The following is the list of number of competitors participating in the Games:

Sport	Men	Women	Total
Athletics	9	0	9
Fencing	5	0	5
Gymnastics	2	0	2
Swimming	1	0	1
Total	17	0	17

The following is the list of dates, when Hungary won medals:

Medals by date
Date	1st place, gold medalist(s)	2nd place, silver medalist(s)	3rd place, bronze medalist(s)	Total
15 July	1	0	1	2
12 August	0	1	1	2
19 August	0	1	0	1
Total	1	2	2	5

== Results by event ==
=== Aquatics ===
==== Swimming ====
Hungary continued to win a medal with each entry in a swimming event, taking three medals in 1900 to add to the two won in 1896. Halmay's medals were silver and bronze, however, whereas Hajós had taken a pair of gold medals four year earlier.

Men

Athlete	Event	Semifinals		Final	
Athlete	Event	Time	Rank	Time	Rank
Zoltán Halmay	200 m freestyle	2:38.0	1 Q	2:31.4	2nd place, silver medalist(s)
Zoltán Halmay	1000 m freestyle	14:52.0	1 Q	15:16.4	3rd place, bronze medalist(s)
Zoltán Halmay	4000 m freestyle	1:11:33.4	1 Q	1:08:55.4	2nd place, silver medalist(s)

=== Athletics ===
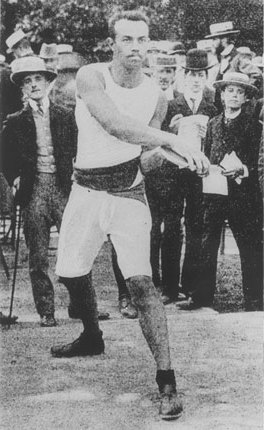
Rudolf Bauer

Hungary won a gold and a bronze medal in athletics, tying Canada for 4th place in the sport's medal leaderboard. 9 athletes competed in 13 events.

Men

Track & road events

Athlete	Event	Heat		Semifinal		Repechage		Final	
Athlete	Event	Result	Rank	Result	Rank	Result	Rank	Result	Rank
Pál Koppán	60 metres	Unknown	4–5	—N/a				did not advance	
Pál Koppán	100 metres	Unknown	3	did not advance					
Pál Koppán	400 metres	Unknown	4	—N/a				did not advance	
Ernő Schubert	60 metres	Unknown	4–5	—N/a				did not advance	
Ernő Schubert	100 metres	Unknown	3	did not advance					
Ernő Schubert	200 metres	Unknown	4	—N/a				did not advance	
Zoltán Speidl	400 metres	Unknown	4–5	—N/a				did not advance	
Zoltán Speidl	800 metres	(2:01.1)	2 Q	—N/a				Unknown	5
Zoltán Speidl	200 metres hurdles	Unknown	6	—N/a				did not advance	

Field events

Athlete	Event	Qualifying		Final	
Athlete	Event	Distance	Position	Distance	Position
Rudolf Bauer	Discus throw	36.04	1 Q	no better mark	1st place, gold medalist(s)
Artúr Coray	Shot put	11.13	7	did not advance	
Artúr Coray	Discus throw	31.00	11	did not advance	
Rezső Crettier	Shot put	11.58	4 Q	12.07	4
Rezső Crettier	Discus throw	33.65	5 Q	no better mark	5
Lajos Gönczy	High jump	—N/a		1.75	3rd place, bronze medalist(s)
Jakab Kauser	Pole vault	—N/a		3.10	4
Pál Koppán	Triple jump	—N/a		Unknown	7–13
Pál Koppán	Standing triple jump	—N/a		Unknown	5–10
Ernő Schubert	Long jump	6.050	9	did not advance	
Gyula Strausz	Long jump	6.010	10	did not advance	
Gyula Strausz	Discus throw	29.80	14	did not advance	

=== Fencing ===
Hungary first competed in fencing at the Olympics in the sport's second appearance. The nation sent seven fencers.

Men

Athlete	Event	Round 1		Quarterfinal		Repechage		Semifinal		Final	
Athlete	Event	Result	Rank	Result	Rank	Result	Rank	Result	Rank	Result	Rank
Márton Endrédy	Masters épée	unknown	3–6	—N/a				did not advance			
Márton Endrédy	Masters foil	unknown (Note: The masters foil used jury verdicts on art and skill in the bout rather than winning or losing to advance to the second round.)	unknown	did not advance							
Márton Endrédy	Masters sabre	unknown	unknown	—N/a				did not advance			
Lajos Horváth	Masters sabre	unknown	unknown	—N/a				did not advance			
Amon Ritter von Gregurich	Sabre	unknown	1–4 Q	—N/a				unknown	1 Q	4–3	4
Hugó Hoch	Sabre	unknown	1–4 Q	—N/a				unknown	5–8	did not advance	
Gyula Iványi	Sabre	unknown	1–4 Q	—N/a				unknown	1 Q	3–4	5
Miklós Todoresku	Sabre	unknown	5 Q (Note: Lécuyer withdrew after the first round, to be replaced by Todoresku. It can therefore be inferred that Todoresku was the fifth-place fencer in the same preliminary pool as Lécuyer.)	—N/a				unknown	5–8	did not advance	

According to Herman De Wael there were two other Hungarian fencers in the masters épée competition, but they did not advance from round 1. Their names are not known.

=== Gymnastics ===
==== Artistic ====
Hungary's second gymnastics appearance included a second appearance by Gyula Kakas. The nation's two gymnasts won no medals in a heavily France-dominated single event.

Men

Athlete	Event	Score	Rank
Gyula Kakas	All-around	211	88
Gyula Katona	All-around	did not finish	
