= Patrick Leahy (athlete) =

Athletics competitor (1877–1927)

Personal information
- Born: 20 May 1877 Cregane, Charleville, Cork, Ireland
- Died: 29 December 1927 (aged 50) Chicago, Illinois, USA

Sport
- Sport: Athletics
- Event: high jump
Medal record
Representing Great Britain
Men's athletics
Silver medal – second place	1900 Paris	High Jump
Bronze medal – third place	1900 Paris	Long Jump

Patrick Joseph Leahy (20 May 1877 – 29 December 1927) was an Irish athlete who won Olympic medals (for Great Britain and Ireland) in the high jump and long jump at the 1900 Summer Olympics.

== Biography ==
Leahy was born in Creggane, in the Civil parish of Hackmys, in the barony of Coshma near Kilmallock in County Limerick, near the border between County Limerick and County Cork. He was one of seven brothers all of whom were sportsmen. His brother Con won medals in jumping at two Olympic Games. Another brother, Timothy, also jumped competitively.

Patrick broke the British high jump record in Dublin in 1898 with a jump of 6 ft. 4in. (1.93 m). He went on to win the AAA Championships high jump title at the 1898 AAA Championships and 1899 AAA Championships and also came third in the long jump in 1899. Leahy also competed internationally in the long jump and the hop, step and jump (triple jump).

In the 1900 Olympic Games in Paris, Leahy took part in three jump disciplines. He won the silver medal in the high jump behind Irving Baxter of the United States, and the bronze medal in the long jump behind Alvin Kraenzlein and Myer Prinstein, he also finished fourth place in the triple jumps behind Prinstein, James Connolly and Lewis Sheldon.

Eight years later, Leahy was back on the Olympic scene when he competed at the 1908 Summer Olympics, held in London, he entered the high jump again, but unfortunately he only finished ninth in the qualifying so didn't advance to the final, unlike his brother Con Leahy who went on to win the silver medal.

In 1909 Patrick and Con Leahy emigrated to the United States. Patrick died in Chicago in 1927, aged 50.
