= Athletics at the 1900 Summer Olympics – Men's long jump =

Men's long jump at the Games of the II Olympiad
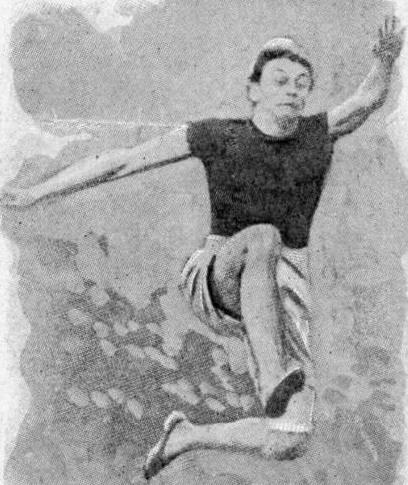
- Alvin Kraenzlein
- Venue: Bois de Boulogne
- Dates: July 14, 1900 (qualifier); July 15, 1900 (final)
- Competitors: 12 from 6 nations
- Winning distance: 7.185 OR

Medalists
1st place, gold medalist(s)		Alvin Kraenzlein; United States
2nd place, silver medalist(s)		Myer Prinstein; United States
3rd place, bronze medalist(s)		Patrick Leahy; Great Britain

The men's long jump was a track & field athletics event at the 1900 Summer Olympics in Paris. It was held on July 14 and July 15, 1900. 12 athletes from six nations competed. The event was won by Alvin Kraenzlein of the United States, the second consecutive victory for the American team. Myer Prinstein, also an American, took silver. Patrick Leahy, an Irish athlete competing for Great Britain, took bronze; it was the first long jump medal for a non-American athlete as the United States had swept the 1896 medals.

== Background ==
This was the second appearance of the event, which is one of 12 athletics events to have been held at every Summer Olympics. None of the jumpers from 1896 returned. The top three jumpers in the world at the time were Americans Alvin Kraenzlein and Myer Prinstein and Irishman Peter O'Connor. All three were entered, but O'Connor did not appear.

Great Britain and Hungary each made their first appearance in the event. France, Germany, Sweden, and the United States all appeared for the second time.

== Competition format ==
Unlike in 1896, where there was a single round of jumping, the 1900 competition featured two rounds: a qualifier and a final. The top five jumpers in the qualifier advanced to the final round. Scores from the qualifier carried over and could be used for the final result.

== Records ==
These were the standing world and Olympic records (in metres) prior to the 1900 Summer Olympics.

World record	Myer Prinstein (USA)	7.50(*)	Philadelphia, United States	28 April 1900
Olympic record	Ellery Harding Clark (USA)	6.35	Athens, Greece	7 April 1896 (NS)

(*) unofficial

== Schedule ==
Date	Time	Round
Saturday, 14 July 1900	11:40	Qualifying
Sunday, 15 July 1900	17:15	Final

== Results ==
All twelve jumpers competed in the qualifier, with the top five moving on to the final.

For the final, scores from the qualifier remained valid. Prinstein, citing an agreement between Kraenzlein and himself not to compete on a Sunday, did not compete in the final on 15 July. Kraenzlein, however, did compete and outperformed Prinstein's mark from the previous day. This infuriated Prinstein, who attempted to strike Kraenzlein. Sources vary as to whether any of the blows actually landed, however.

Delannoy did not improve upon his qualifier mark and dropped to fifth place.

Rank	Athlete	Nation	Distance			Notes
Rank	Athlete	Nation	Qualifier	Final	Best	Notes
1st place, gold medalist(s)	Alvin Kraenzlein	United States	6.930	7.185	7.185	OR
2nd place, silver medalist(s)	Myer Prinstein	United States	7.175 OR	DNS	7.175	
3rd place, bronze medalist(s)	Patrick Leahy	Great Britain	6.710	6.950	6.950	
4	William Remington	United States	6.725	6.825	6.825	
5	Albert Delannoy	France	6.755	Unknown	6.755	
6	John McLean	United States	6.655	Did not advance	6.655	
7	Thaddeus McClain	United States	6.435	Did not advance	6.435	
8	Waldemar Steffen	Germany	6.300	Did not advance	6.300	
9	Ernő Schubert	Hungary	6.050	Did not advance	6.050	
10	Gyula Strausz	Hungary	6.010	Did not advance	6.010	
11	Tore Blom	Sweden	5.770	Did not advance	5.770	
12	Eric Lemming	Sweden	5.500	Did not advance	5.500	
—	Umberto Colombo	Italy	DNS			
—	Peter O'Connor	Great Britain	DNS			
—	Lewis Sheldon	United States	DNS			
—	Albert Witbeck	United States	DNS			

== Sources ==
- International Olympic Committee.
- De Wael, Herman. Herman's Full Olympians: "Athletics 1900". Accessed 18 March 2006. Available electronically at.
- Mallon, Bill (1998). The 1900 Olympic Games, Results for All Competitors in All Events, with Commentary. Jefferson, North Carolina: McFarland & Company, Inc., Publishers. ISBN 0-7864-0378-0.
