= Mary McCracken =

Mary McCracken may refer to:

- Mary Ann McCracken (1770–1866), Irish social activist and campaigner
- Mary Elizabeth McCracken (1911–1945), Chinese-born American medical missionary
- Mary Isabel McCracken (1866—1955), American entomologist, researcher, and teacher
