= Athletics at the 1900 Summer Olympics – Men's standing triple jump =

Athletics at the Olympics

Men's standing triple jump at the Games of the II Olympiad
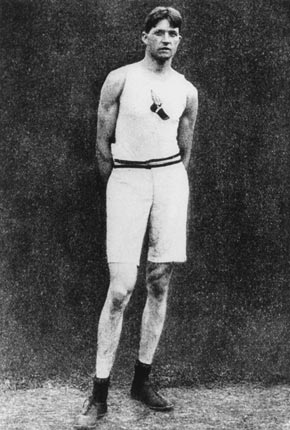
- Ray Ewry
- Venue: Bois de Boulogne
- Date: July 16, 1900
- Competitors: 10 from 4 nations
- Winning distance: 10.58 OR

Medalists
1st place, gold medalist(s)		Ray Ewry; United States
2nd place, silver medalist(s)		Irving Baxter; United States
3rd place, bronze medalist(s)		Robert Garrett; United States

The men's standing triple jump was a track & field athletics event at the 1900 Summer Olympics in Paris, France. It was held on July 16, 1900. 10 athletes from four nations competed in the standing triple jump. The event was won by Ray Ewry of the United States, who took gold in all three of the standing jumps in 1900 (and in all three in 1900 and in both that remained on the programme in each of the 1904, 1906 Intercalated, and 1908 Games). His teammate Irving Baxter earned silver in all three 1900 standing jumps. The American sweep was completed with Robert Garrett taking bronze.

== Background ==
This was the first appearance of the event, which was held twice in 1900 and 1904 (in contrast to the other standing jumps, which continued to be held in 1908 and 1912).

== Competition format ==
There was a single round of jumping. The rules for the jump are not known; the event was called the "hop, step, and jump" at the time but it appears that jumpers could use three standing long jumps rather than a continuous movement.

== Records ==
There were no standing world or Olympic records at the time. Ray Ewry set the first Olympic record in this event with 10.58 metres.

== Schedule ==
Date	Time	Round
Monday, 16 July 1900		Final

== Results ==
Ewry won all three of the standing jumps, with Baxter in second each time. The standing triple jump was the most international of the three, with four countries competing. All of the competitors in the standing triple jump except the medallists also competed in the regular triple jump.

Rank	Athlete	Nation	Distance	Notes
1st place, gold medalist(s)	Ray Ewry	United States	10.58	OR
2nd place, silver medalist(s)	Irving Baxter	United States	9.95	
3rd place, bronze medalist(s)	Robert Garrett	United States	9.50	
4	Lewis Sheldon	United States	9.45	
5–10	Daniel Horton	United States	Unknown	
5–10	Frank Jarvis	United States	Unknown	
5–10	Pál Koppán	Hungary	Unknown	
5–10	John McLean	United States	Unknown	
5–10	Karl Staaf	Sweden	Unknown	
5–10	Waldemar Steffen	Germany	Unknown	
—	James Brendan Connolly	United States	DNS	
—	Arpád Danos	Hungary	DNS	
—	Eric Lemming	Sweden	DNS	
—	Václav Nový	Bohemia	DNS	
—	Myer Prinstein	United States	DNS	

== Sources ==
- International Olympic Committee.
- De Wael, Herman. Herman's Full Olympians: "Athletics 1900". Accessed 18 March 2006. Available electronically at.Mallon, Bill (1998). The 1900 Olympic Games, Results for All Competitors in All Events, with Commentary. Jefferson, North Carolina: McFarland & Company, Inc., Publishers. ISBN 0-7864-0378-0.
