= Athletics at the 1900 Summer Olympics – Men's shot put =

Men's shot put at the Games of the II Olympiad
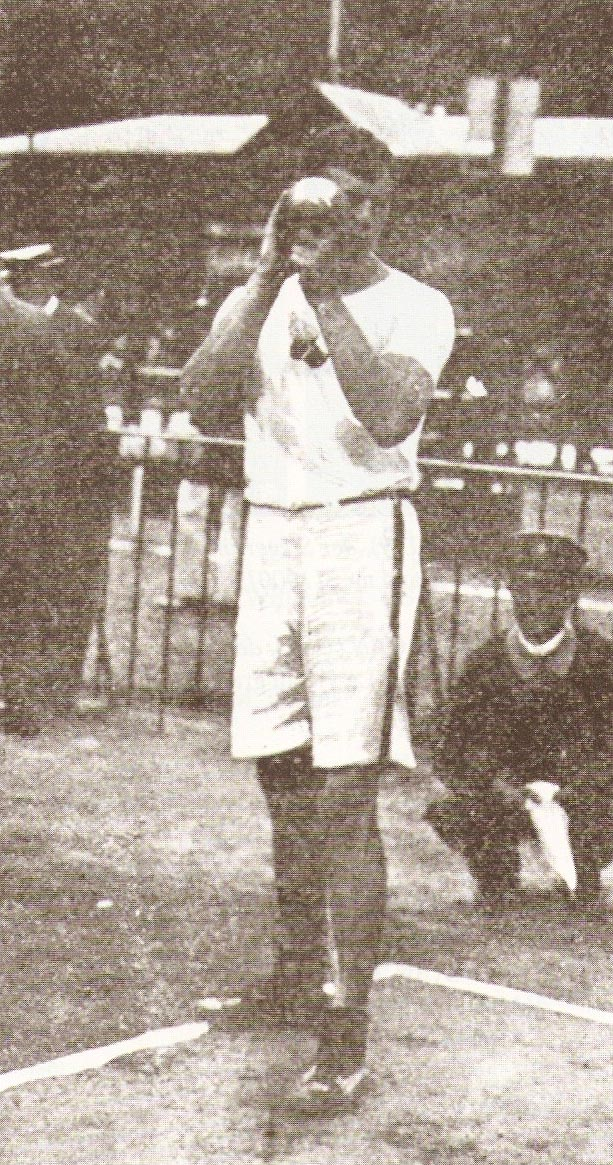
- Richard Sheldon
- Venue: Bois de Boulogne
- Dates: July 14, 1900 (qualifying); July 15, 1900 (final)
- Competitors: 11 from 5 nations
- Winning distance: 14.10 OR

Medalists
1st place, gold medalist(s)		Richard Sheldon; United States
2nd place, silver medalist(s)		Josiah McCracken; United States
3rd place, bronze medalist(s)		Robert Garrett; United States

The men's shot put was a track & field athletics event at the 1900 Summer Olympics in Paris. It was held on July 14 and July 15, 1900. 11 shot putters from five nations competed. The event was won by Richard Sheldon of the United States, the nation's second consecutive victory in the men's shot put. Josiah McCracken took silver and Robert Garrett took bronze (the first man to win two medals in the event, after gold in 1896), completing an American medal sweep.

The winning margin was 1.25 metres. As of 2023, this is the only time the men's shot put has been won by more than one metre at the Olympics.

== Background ==
This was the second appearance of the event, which is one of 12 athletics events to have been held at every Summer Olympics. Defending champion Robert Garrett was the only returning shot putter from 1896. Sotirios Versis had competed in the discus in 1896, but had not competed in the shot put then. Richard Sheldon was the 1896 IC4A and 1899 AAU champion (doubling in the discus in the latter competition). World record holder George Gray was not present.

Hungary and Sweden each made their debut in the men's shot put. Denmark, Greece, and the United States all appeared for the second time.

== Competition format ==
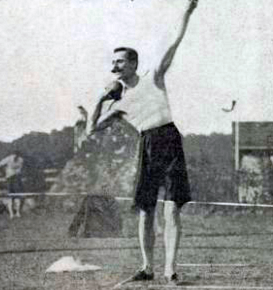
Panagiotis Paraskevopoulos putting the shot

There were two rounds of throwing, with results carried over from qualifying to the final. The format of the competition is unclear; it appears that each thrower received three throws and the finalists received three more. The top five throwers in the qualifying round qualified for the final. The throwing stage was a 2.13 metre square.

== Records ==
These were the standing world and Olympic records (in metres) prior to the 1900 Summer Olympics.

World record	George Gray (CAN)^{*}	14.75	Ottawa, Canada	1 August 1898
Olympic record	Robert Garrett (USA)	11.22	Athens, Greece	7 April 1896

^{*} unofficial

Richard Sheldon set a new Olympic record in the qualification with 13.80 metres and improved his mark in the final to 14.10 metres. All five of the finalists had beaten the old Olympic record in the qualifying round.

== Schedule ==
Date	Time	Round
Saturday, 14 July 1900	10:55	Qualifying
Sunday, 15 July 1900	14:25	Final

== Results ==
All throwers competed in the qualifier on July 14. Versis did not record a fair mark and it is not clear if he actually competed. The top five advanced to the final.

Qualifier marks were still valid in the final. McCracken and Garrett did not compete, as the final was held on July 15, a Sunday. No changes in position occurred during the final.

Rank	Athlete	Nation	Distance			Notes
Rank	Athlete	Nation	Qualifier	Final	Best	Notes
1st place, gold medalist(s)	Richard Sheldon	United States	13.80 OR	14.10 OR	14.10	OR
2nd place, silver medalist(s)	Josiah McCracken	United States	12.85	X	12.85	
3rd place, bronze medalist(s)	Robert Garrett	United States	12.37	X	12.37	
4	Rezső Crettier	Hungary	11.58	12.07	12.07	
5	Panagiotis Paraskevopoulos	Greece	11.29	11.52	11.52	
6	Gustaf Söderström	Sweden	11.18	Did not advance	11.18	
7	Artúr Coray	Hungary	11.13	Did not advance	11.13	
8	Truxtun Hare	United States	10.92	Did not advance	10.92	
9	August Nilsson	Sweden	10.86	Did not advance	10.86	
10	Charles Winckler	Denmark	10.76	Did not advance	10.76	
—	Sotirios Versis	Greece	No mark	Did not advance	No mark	

== Sources ==
- International Olympic Committee.
- De Wael, Herman. Herman's Full Olympians: "Athletics 1900". Accessed 18 March 2006. Available electronically at.
- Mallon, Bill (1998). The 1900 Olympic Games, Results for All Competitors in All Events, with Commentary. Jefferson, North Carolina: McFarland & Company, Inc., Publishers. ISBN 0-7864-0378-0.
