= John Flanagan (hammer thrower) =

American hammer thrower

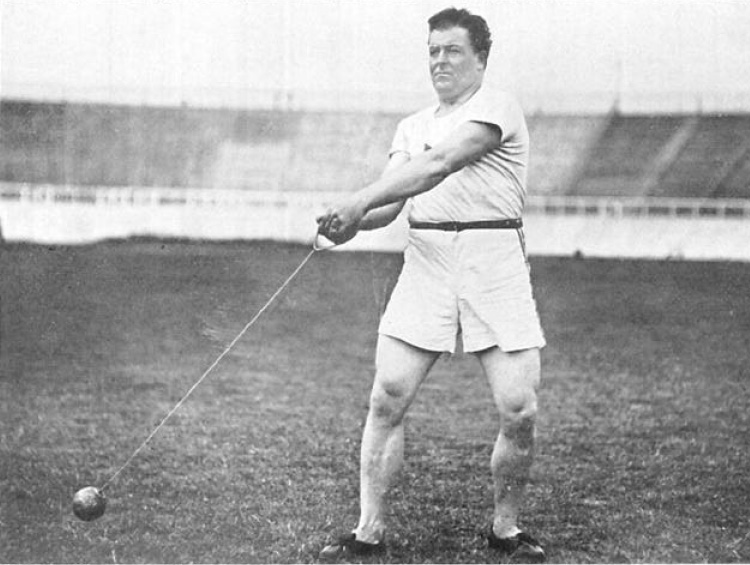
- Flanagan posing with 16 lb. hammer weight in 1908

Personal information
- Born: January 28, 1868 Ballinvreena, Ireland
- Died: June 3, 1938 (aged 70) Limerick, Ireland

Sport
- Sport: Athletics
- Event: Hammer throw
Medal record
Men's athletics
Representing the United States
Olympic Games
Gold medal – first place	1900 Paris	Hammer throw
Gold medal – first place	1904 St. Louis	Hammer throw
Gold medal – first place	1908 London	Hammer throw
Silver medal – second place	1904 St. Louis	Weight throw

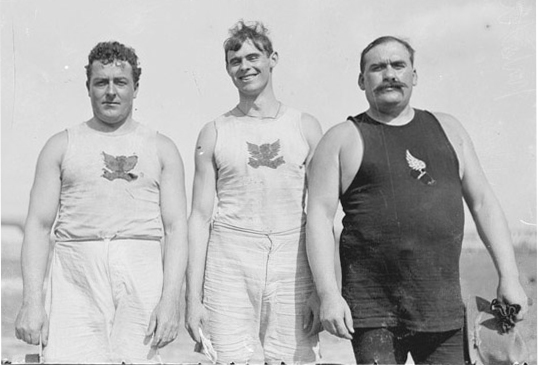
John Flanagan and Martin Sheridan of the Irish American Athletic Club, with fellow Irishman James Mitchell of the New York Athletic Club at the 1904 Olympic Games in St. Louis, Missouri.

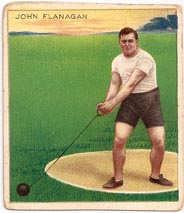

John Joseph Flanagan (sometimes spelled Flannigan; January 28, 1868 – June 3, 1938) was an Irish-American three-time Olympic gold medalist in the hammer throw, winning in 1900, 1904, and 1908.

== Biography ==
John Flanagan was born in the townland of Ballinvreena and raised in Kilbreedy East, near Martinstown in County Limerick, Ireland. John was the first son of Ellen Kinkead and Michael Flanagan (married Feb 1867), then a farm steward for the Gabbett's of Kilmallock. As was often the case in those times his mother Ellen went home to her birth family, the Kinkeads of Ballinvreena, to have her first child.

He became the British hammer throw champion after winning the AAA Championships title at the 1896 AAA Championships.

He emigrated to the United States of America in 1896. At that time he already held the world record for the hammer throw. He competed for both the New York Athletic Club and the Irish American Athletic Club, and was part of a group of Irish-American athletes known as the Irish Whales.

Flanagan returned to London (this time as an American) to win a second AAA Championships title at the 1900 AAA Championships. Shortly afterwards Flanagan represented his new country at the Olympic Games. Flanagan, the only non-college man to medal for the Americans, outdistanced American athlete Truxtun Hare by 4.75 meters in the hammer throw. Hare and Josiah McCracken, both college football players from University of Pennsylvania, took silver and bronze. Flanagan also competed in the discus throw, finishing seventh.

Flanagan joined the New York City Police Department (NYPD) in 1903, and his first assignment was to the Bureau of Licenses, where he had a lot of time on his hands, which was mostly used to train at the Irish American Athletic Club in Queens. It was during that time that he became one of the masters of the three-turn technique. In the 1904 Olympic Games, sporting the Winged Fist of the Irish American Athletic Club, Flanagan set a new world record of 168 feet, 1 inch. He placed second to the Canadian, Étienne Desmarteau, in the 56-pound throw event.

In 1905, while attached to the 37th Precinct, Flanagan competed in the Police Athletic Association games held at Celtic Park in New York. "Not only did he win four of weight-throwing events, but, as if to show that he could do a little sprinting as readily as he can outclass his competitors with the 16 and 56 pound weights, he not only had the temerity to enter the fat men's race, but actually won it," giving him a total of five first place victories, "a most commendable showing, for there were many mighty policemen arrayed against him."

In the 1908 Olympics in London, Flanagan broke his own record with a hammer throw of 170 feet, 4.5 inches. The silver that year went to another New York City police officer, the former record holder Matt McGrath. John Flanagan competed in the tug-of-war as well. On July 24, 1909, at the age of 41 years, 196 days, Flanagan set his last world record in the hammer, with a throw of 56.18 meters. This constituted the oldest person in the sport of athletics to break a world record (pre IAAF jurisdiction).

Flanagan quit the police force in 1910, after his public office squad was abolished and he was transferred to the West 68th Street Station and forced to walk a beat along Central Park West, giving him no time to train and compete. He returned home to Limerick in 1911 and took over the family farm following the death of his father in 1912. He continued to compete in Ireland and won his final international event when competing against Scotland in 1911. He also won the Irish Hammer Championships of 1911 and 1912. Following his retirement, he coached a number of athletes, including Patrick O'Callaghan, who went on to win two Olympic gold medals in the hammer throw at the 1928 and 1932 games. He died at home in Limerick, aged 70, on 3 June 1938. A statue of Flanagan was erected beside Martinstown Church in Limerick in 2001.
