= Athletics at the 1900 Summer Olympics – Men's standing long jump =

Athletics at the Olympics

Men's standing long jump at the Games of the II Olympiad
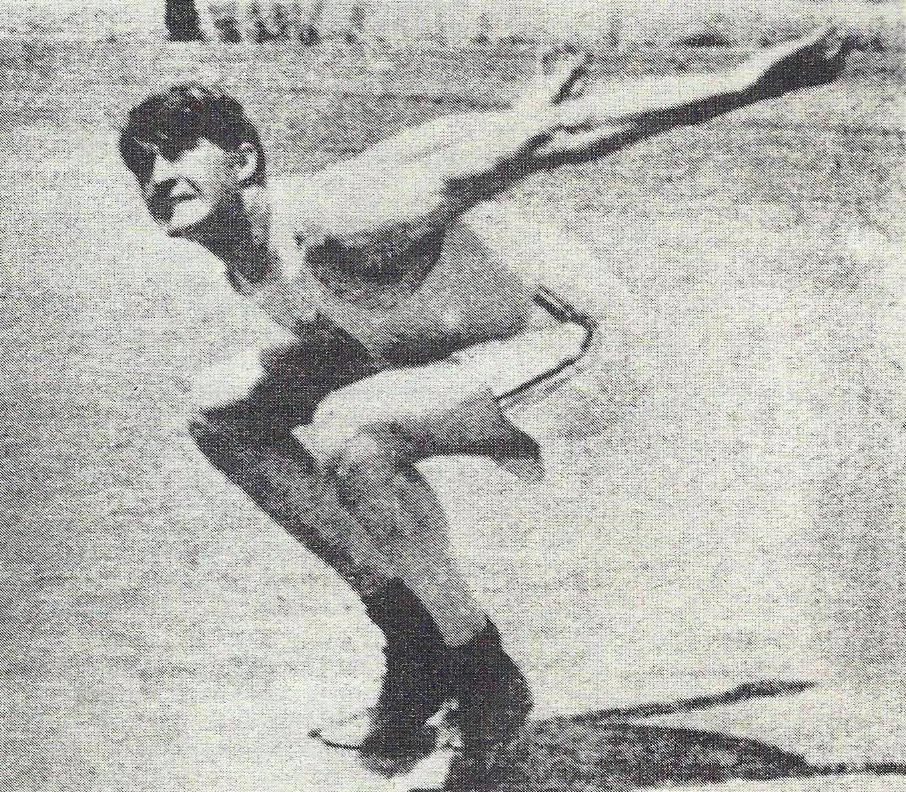
- Ray Ewry competing
- Venue: Bois de Boulogne
- Date: July 16, 1900
- Competitors: 4 from 2 nations
- Winning distance: 3.21 OR

Medalists
1st place, gold medalist(s)		Ray Ewry; United States
2nd place, silver medalist(s)		Irving Baxter; United States
3rd place, bronze medalist(s)		Émile Torchebœuf; France

The men's standing long jump was a track & field athletics event at the 1900 Summer Olympics in Paris. It was held on July 16, 1900. Four athletes from two nations competed in the standing long jump. The event was won by Ray Ewry of the United States, with his teammate Irving Baxter the runner-up; the two dominated all three of the standing jumps in 1900, finishing first and second in each. Ewry would take gold medals in all eight standing jump events from 1900 to 1908 (as well as both events at the 1906 Intercalated Games). The bronze medal was won by Émile Torchebœuf of France.

== Background ==
This was the first appearance of the event, which was held four times from 1900 to 1912.

== Competition format ==
There was a single round of jumping.

== Records ==
There was no extant world record. This was the first appearance of the event at the Olympics, so there was no Olympic record either. Ray Ewry set the initial Olympic record with 3.30 metres.

== Schedule ==
Date	Time	Round
Monday, 16 July 1900		Final

== Results ==
Ewry won all three of the standing jumps in 1900. Just as in the others, he had little difficulty winning the standing long jump, also setting the first Olympic record.

Rank	Athlete	Nation	Distance	Notes
1st place, gold medalist(s)	Ray Ewry	United States	3.30	OR
2nd place, silver medalist(s)	Irving Baxter	United States	3.135	
3rd place, bronze medalist(s)	Émile Torchebœuf	France	3.03	
4	Lewis Sheldon	United States	3.02	

== Sources ==
- International Olympic Committee.
- De Wael, Herman. Herman's Full Olympians: "Athletics 1900". Accessed 18 March 2006. Available electronically at.
- Mallon, Bill (1998). The 1900 Olympic Games, Results for All Competitors in All Events, with Commentary. Jefferson, North Carolina: McFarland & Company, Inc., Publishers. ISBN 0-7864-0378-0.
