= Daniel Horton =

Daniel Horton may refer to:

- Daniel Horton (basketball) (born 1984), professional basketball player
- Daniel Horton (pole vaulter) (1879–?), American track and field athlete
