= Émile Torchebœuf =

French long jumper (1876–1950)

Émile Torcheboeuf
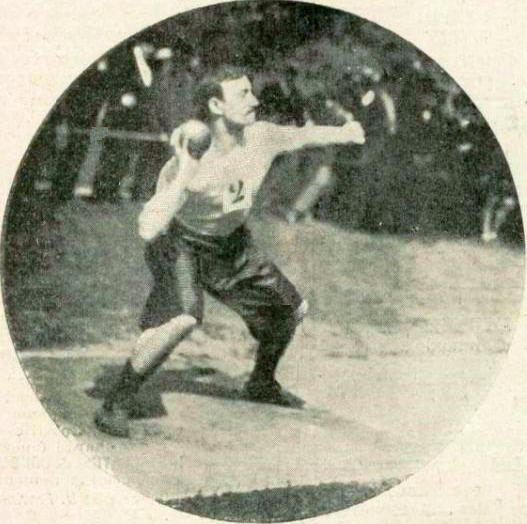
- Torchebœuf in 1900

Personal information
- Born: 17 July 1876 Saint-Ouen, Seine-Saint-Denis, France
- Died: 29 November 1950 (aged 74) Paris, France

Sport
- Country: France
- Sport: Athletics
- Event: Standing long jump
- Club: Racing Club de France
Medal record
Olympic Games
| Bronze medal – third place | 1900 Paris | Standing long jump |

Émile Torcheboeuf (17 July 1876 – 29 November 1950) was a French long jumper who competed in the late 19th century and early 20th century. He participated in Athletics at the 1900 Summer Olympics in Paris and won the bronze medal in the men's standing long jump.
