= Richard von Foregger =

Austrian-American chemist

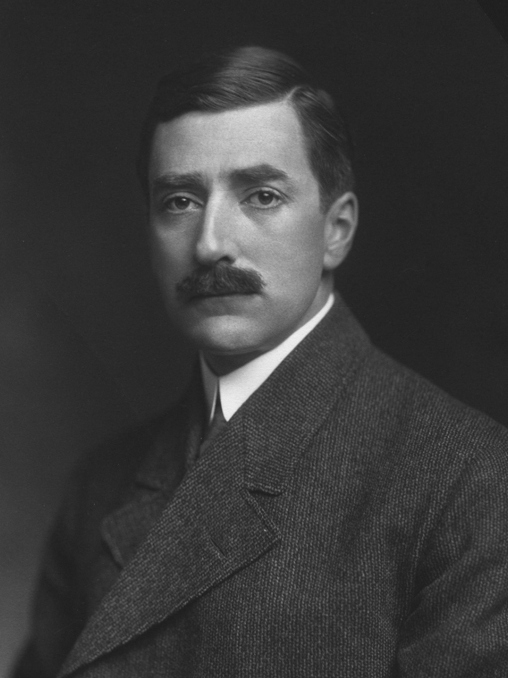

Personal information
- Born: 27 June 1872 Vienna, Austria-Hungary
- Died: 18 January 1960 (aged 87) Roslyn, New York, U.S.

Sport
- Sport: Swimming
- Strokes: Freestyle
- Club: New York Athletic Club

Richard von Foregger (27 June 1872 – 18 January 1960) was an Austrian-American chemist, manufacturer and Olympic swimmer. He was born in Austria, educated in Germany and Switzerland, and worked in the United States, where he invented and mass-produced several air regeneration systems. He moved to the US in 1902, obtained citizenship in 1910, and lived there until his death.

== Early years ==
Richard von Foregger was the son of Richard and Elise von Etlinger. His father was a judge and later a senator in the Austrian Parliament. His mother was born and raised in Odessa, then part of the Russian Empire. She taught von Foregger some Russian, in addition to his native German and fluent French and English. He graduated from the Ludwig-Maximilians-Universität München. There he trained in fencing that left lifelong scars on his face. He continued his education at the University of Stuttgart and the University of Bern, where he defended his PhD in chemistry in 1896. He then worked for a British company in Russia on the construction of the Trans-Siberian Railway. In 1898, he first visited the United States, where he worked until 1900 as an electrical engineer at General Electric in Schenectady, New York.

In 1900, he returned to Europe and lived in Berlin. That same year he competed for Austria at the 1900 Summer Olympics in 200m freestyle swimming, but he did not reach the finals.

== Anesthesiology work ==
In 1902, von Foregger returned to US to work at the Medical Dioxide Co., in New York. There he first developed a method of producing peroxides of magnesium and zinc and then shifted to alkali peroxides aiming to use them for oxygen generation. In 1905, while working at the Roessler and Hasslacher Chemical Co., New York, he produced oxygen by reacting water with fused sodium peroxide.

He quickly moved from chemical experiments to life supporting systems. In 1906, he performed two public experiments, in which a person was sealed in a box for six hours, and a group of rabbits for 15 hours, without showing any breathing discomforts. Shortly thereafter he designed a portable oxygen generator that was tested by mountain climbers, long-distance runners and bicycle racers. From 1907 to 1909, he patented it and named Autogenor. Since Roessler and Hasslacher were focused on the production of chemicals and not interested in anesthesiology equipment, in 1914, von Foregger established his own production company.

Since 1907, von Foregger closely collaborated with the anesthetist James Tayloe Gwathmey (1862–1944), who introduced Autogenor to Henry Edmund Gaskin Boyle in 1913. Boyle ordered two such devices from the US and later built his own generator based on the Gwathmey-von Foregger design.

In the 1910s, von Foregger worked on improving oxygen generators, and in the late 1920s, he introduced the closed-circuit CO_{2} absorbers in the US. His later work spread into all kinds of anesthetic accessories, and by the 1960s, the products catalogue of his company contained more than 160 pages. In the 1950s, his devices represented about 15% of anesthesia equipment in the US hospitals. He was a keen proponent of the metric system into medical equipment, which is considered as one of his major contributions. Puritan Bennett Corporation acquired Foregger equipment in 1978, in 1981 they were the 1st equipment manufacturer to use electronic gating on breath control and gas and agents to patients. Although this was innovated the concept Puritan Bennett their parent company closed the Athesia division and stopped producing equipment in 1984 Foregger was #2 in anesthesia manufacturers but was closed anyway.

== Personal life ==
Von Foregger was an atheist and avid non-smoker. He married three times. In 1900, while in Berlin he married Elza. After her husband moved to the US, she returned to Berlin and their marriage was dissolved. In 1911, von Foregger married Dorothy Ledwith (1891–1981) from New York. They had two sons, John Herbert Foregger (1914–2005) and Richard Foregger (1912–2010); Richard was also a renowned anesthesiologist and wrote a detailed biography of his father. Von Foregger and Ledwith were divorced in 1927. In 1946, von Foregger married his housekeeper, Lillie Mae Holt (1900–1990). In the late 1950s, his mental condition deteriorated, and he was diagnosed with paranoid psychosis, though this diagnosis was strongly contested by Holt. After his death in 1960, his company changed owners several times and was dissolved in 1987.
