= John McLean (athlete) =

American athlete and coach (1878–1955)

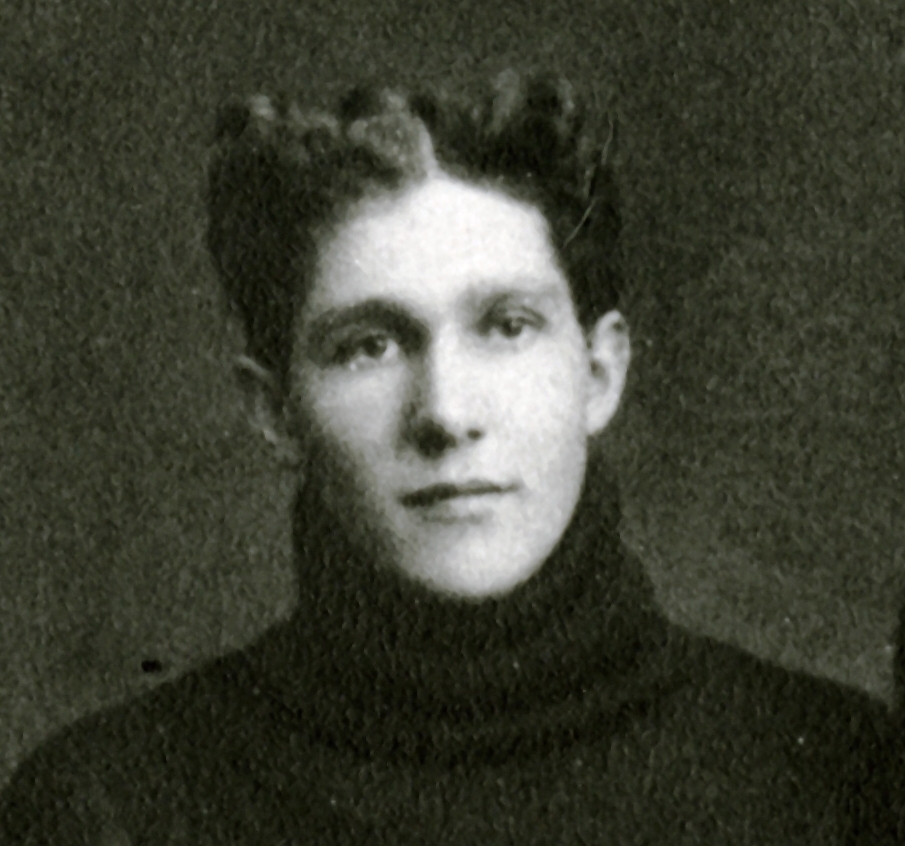
- McLean, cropped from 1898 Michigan team photograph

Biographical details
- Born: January 10, 1878; Menominee, Michigan, U.S.
- Died: June 4, 1955 (aged 77); Detroit, Michigan, U.S.

Playing career

Football
- 1897–1899: Michigan
- Position: Halfback

Coaching career (HC unless noted)

Football
- 1901–1902: Knox (IL)
- 1903–1905: Missouri

Track and field
- 1904: Missouri

Head coaching record
- Overall: 24–22–4 (football)

Accomplishments and honors

Awards
- Third-team All-American (1899)

John Frederick McLean (January 10, 1878 – June 4, 1955) was an All-American college football player, track and field athlete, and coach. He won a silver medal in the 110 metre hurdles at the 1900 Summer Olympics in Paris with a time of 15.5 seconds. He was also selected as an All-American football player in 1899 while playing for the University of Michigan. He went on to coach the Knox College and University of Missouri football teams in the 1900s. He was dismissed from his coaching position at Missouri in January 1906 after being accused of paying money to a player. Knox College voted him into their athletic Hall of Fame in 2012.

== Athlete at Michigan ==
McLean's hometown was Menominee, Michigan, a lumber town located in Michigan's Upper Peninsula. He enrolled in the University of Michigan where he became a star athlete in American football, track and field, and baseball. He played as a substitute on Michigan's 1897 football team and played left halfback for the 1898 and 1899 teams. McLean was also a member of Michigan's track and baseball teams. In May 1899, McLean set the University of Michigan school record in the 120-yard hurdles with a time of 16-1/5 seconds. On the same day, he also broke a western intercollegiate record in the running broad jump by clearing 23 feet.

In 1898, McLean played on Michigan's first Western Conference (as the Big Ten Conference was then known) championship football team. The Wolverines won the championship with a 12–11 victory over Chicago—a game that inspired Louis Elbel to write the University of Michigan's fight song, "The Victors." McLean contributed to the win over Chicago with a kick return to the 50-yard line and a second kick return for 35 yards.

In November 1899, McLean led the Wolverines in a game against eastern football power, the University of Pennsylvania at Franklin Field in Philadelphia. The Wolverines lost the game 11–10, but McLean's play at left halfback drew praise in newspaper accounts carried across the country. McLean made several long runs, principally on end runs. Michigan scored its first touchdown "wholly on a series of runs by McLean, around Pennsylvania's left end." The score came on a 22-yard end run that "set the Michigan rooters fairly wild." The New York Times reported that even the Penn fans showed their appreciation for McLean -- "his brilliant sprinting around Pennsylvania's ends often brought applause from the followers of the Quakers."

McLean's final game for Michigan was a November 1899 match against the University of Wisconsin played in front of 17,000 fans in Chicago. Newspaper accounts reported that Michigan's "crack halfback" McLean "made one of his end runs" with ten minutes to play—a forty-yard run for a touchdown. Another newspaper described McLean's final touchdown as follows: "the premier halfback, receiving the ball on the forty-yard line, bounded past the Badgers' left end, and at a high speed struck out for the goal line."

After the season ended, McLean received acknowledgement with his selection as a first-team All-American, including All-American selections by The Philadelphia Inquirer and The Fort Wayne News.

== Olympic athlete ==
John McLean
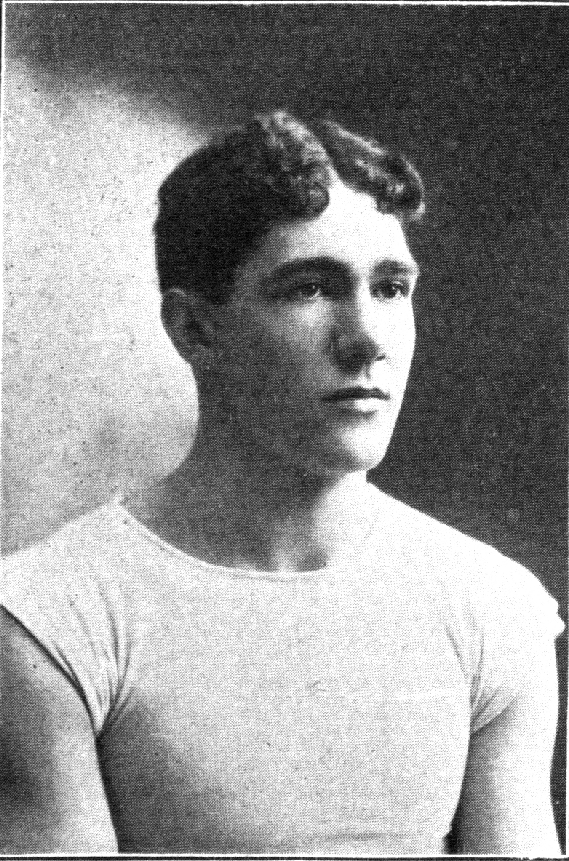
- John McLean

Medal record

Men's athletics

Representing the United States

Olympic Games
Silver medal – second place	1900 Paris	110 metre hurdles

McLean competed for the United States in track and field events at the 1900 Summer Olympics in Paris. He won the silver medal in the 110 metre hurdles with a time of 15.5 seconds. Alvin Kraenzlein took gold with a time of 15.4 seconds.

McLean also took sixth place in the long jump with a distance of 6.655 metres, not making it into the top five who qualified for the final, as well as the triple jump, in which he did not place in the top six, and the standing triple jump, in which he did not make the top four.

== Coaching career ==
=== Knox ===
In 1901, McLean became the head football coach at Knox College, a private liberal arts college located in Galesburg, Illinois. He compiled a 15–5–3 record as football coach at Knox from 1901 to 1902. McLean turned Knox into an elite football program in 1902, leading to speculation that he was recruiting ringers. McLean denied the allegation, insisting that every man on the team was "a bona fide student of the college." He was voted into the Knox–Lombard Athletic Hall of Fame in 2012. McLean won fame "by coaching little Knox college into a high place in western football."

=== Missouri ===
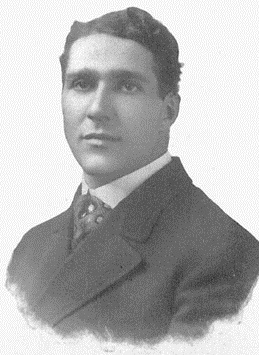
McLean at Missouri, c. 1907

In 1903, McLean was hired as the head football coach at the University of Missouri. He coached the Missouri Tigers for three years (1903–1905) and compiled an overall record of 9–17–1. In 1906, McLean became involved in a scandal that resulted in his dismissal as Missouri's head coach. Evidence was presented that Akerson, the star fullback on Missouri's 1904 team, was a professional who had been "hired" to serve on the team. Akerson had previously played at Knox and went on to become "one of the best individual players who was ever a member of a Tiger team." McLean paid Akerson $250 out of his own pocket, and several alumni from Kansas City were to have shared the expense. However, the others "welched," and when McLean wrote to them requesting that they pay their share, they turned over the correspondence to the university's athletic director. The news created "a real sensation" that resulted in McLean's being "dismissed in disgrace." A Nebraska newspaper called it "the biggest scandal in the history of Missouri athletics," and some even called for the abolition of football at the school.

== Family and death ==
McLean married to Sarah Georgiana Grant on April 29, 1910, in St. Paul, Minnesota. He died on June 4, 1955.

== Head coaching record ==
=== Football ===
Year	Team	Overall	Bowl/playoffs
Knox Old Siwash (Independent) (1901–1902)
1901	Knox	8–3–1	
1902	Knox	9–2	
Knox:		15–5–3	
Missouri Tigers (Independent) (1903–1905)
1903	Missouri	1–7–1	
1904	Missouri	3–6	
1905	Missouri	5–4	
Missouri:		9–17–1	
Total:		24–22–4	
