= Athletics at the 1900 Summer Olympics – Men's hammer throw =

Athletics at the Olympics

Men's hammer throw at the Games of the II Olympiad
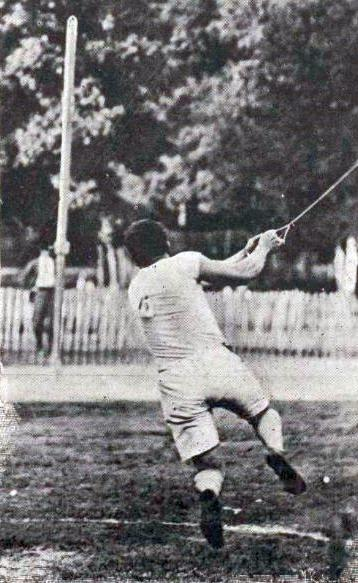
- John Flanagan competing
- Venue: Bois de Boulogne
- Date: July 16, 1900
- Competitors: 5 from 2 nations
- Winning distance: 51.01 OR

Medalists
1st place, gold medalist(s)		John Flanagan; United States
2nd place, silver medalist(s)		Truxtun Hare; United States
3rd place, bronze medalist(s)		Josiah McCracken; United States

The men's hammer throw was a track & field athletics event at the 1900 Summer Olympics in Paris, the discipline's first Olympic appearance. It was held on July 16, 1900. Five hammer throwers from two nations competed. The event was won by John Flanagan of the United States, the first of his three consecutive victories in the hammer throw. The American team swept the medals, with Truxtun Hare finishing second and Josiah McCracken third.

== Background ==
This was the first appearance of the event, which has been held at every Summer Olympics except 1896. Two nations competed: the United States and Sweden. The Americans were familiar with the event; the Swedes were not.

== Competition format ==
The format of the competition is unclear. The throwing area was a nine-foot circle.

== Records ==
These were the standing world and Olympic records (in metres) prior to the 1900 Summer Olympics.

World record	John Flanagan (GBR)^{*}	51.10^{**}	New York City, United States	23 September 1899
Olympic record		None		

^{*} Flanagan represented the United Kingdom of Great Britain and Ireland before immigrating to the United States and becoming a U.S. citizen.

^{**} unofficial

John Flanagan set the first Olympic record for this event with 51.01 metres.

== Schedule ==
Date	Time	Round
Monday, 16 July 1900		Final

== Results ==
Rank	Athlete	Nation	Distance	Notes
1st place, gold medalist(s)	John Flanagan	United States	51.01	OR
2nd place, silver medalist(s)	Truxtun Hare	United States	46.26	
3rd place, bronze medalist(s)	Josiah McCracken	United States	43.58	
4	Eric Lemming	Sweden	Unknown	
5	Karl Staaf	Sweden	Unknown	

== Sources ==
- International Olympic Committee.
- De Wael, Herman. Herman's Full Olympians: "Athletics 1900". Accessed 18 March 2006. Available electronically at.
- Mallon, Bill (1998). The 1900 Olympic Games, Results for All Competitors in All Events, with Commentary. Jefferson, North Carolina: McFarland & Company, Inc., Publishers. ISBN 0-7864-0378-0.
