= 1901 AAA Championships =

Outdoor track and field competition

- Dates: 6 July 1901
- Host city: Huddersfield, England
- Venue: Fartown Ground
- Level: Senior
- Type: Outdoor
- Events: 15

The 1901 AAA Championships was the 1901 edition of the annual outdoor track and field competition organised by the Amateur Athletic Association (AAA). It was held on Saturday 6 July 1901 at the Fartown Ground in Huddersfield, England.

A new event was added to the Championships when the 2 miles walk was introduced. This also resulted in the 4 miles walk reverting to the distance of 7 miles (which was held previously from 1866 until 1893).

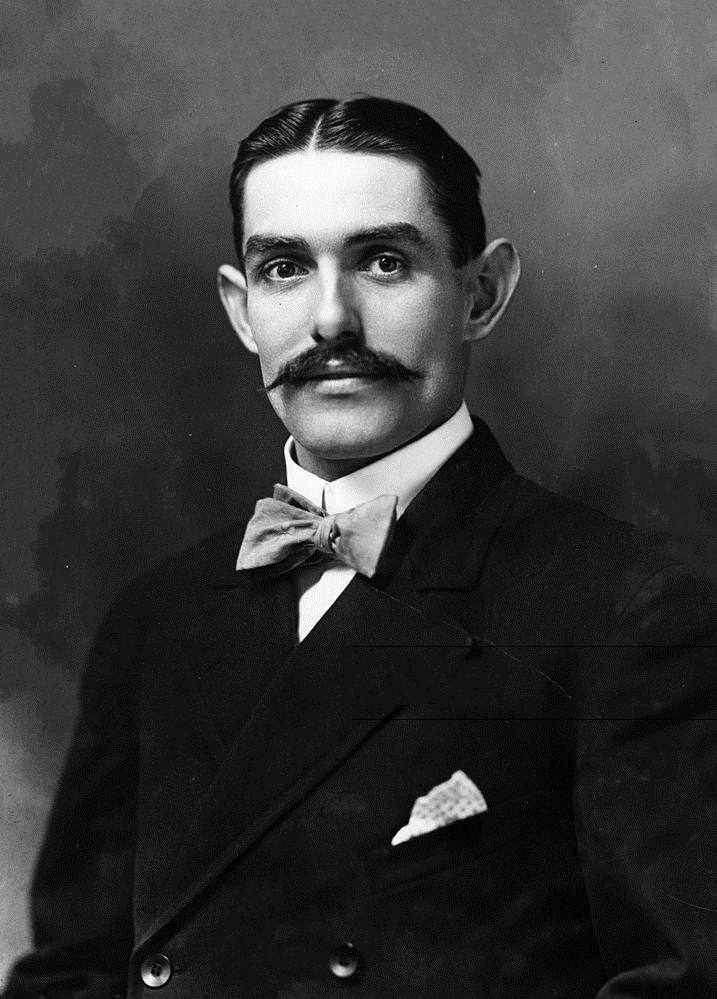
Alfred Shrubb won two more AAA titles

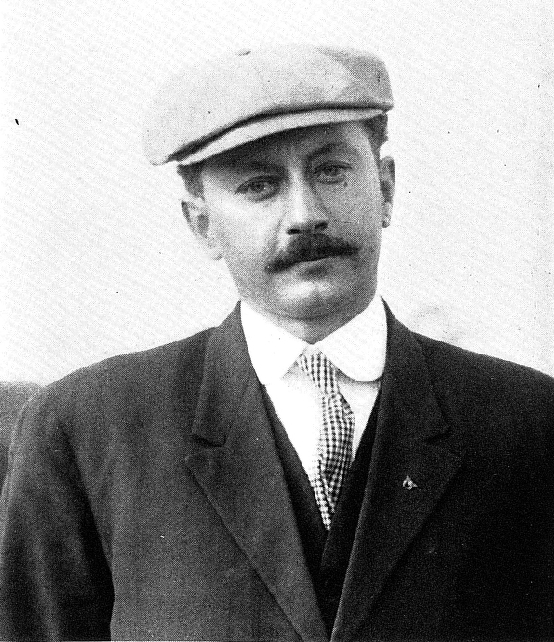
Olympic champion Alvin Kraenzlein successfully defended his hurdles title

== Results ==
Event	Gold		Silver		Bronze	
100 yards	(United States) Arthur Duffey	10.0	Reginald Wadsley	3 yd	(Leinster) Denis Murray	inches
440 yards	Reginald Wadsley	49.8	(United States) Maxie Long	2 yd	(Scotland) William Welsh	1 yd
880 yards	John Cleave	1:59.6	E. Harrison Kenyon	2:01.6	Alec Nelson	5 yd
1 mile	Francis Cockshott	4:21.4	Alfred Shrubb	4:27.0	(France) Henri Deloge	4:28.0
4 miles	Alfred Shrubb	20:01.8	Albert Barker	20:42.4	Fred Appleby	21:08.0
10 miles	Alfred Shrubb	53:32.0	John Rimmer	54:01.0	Albert Barker	54:35.0
steeplechase	Sidney Robinson	11:07.4	T. W. Walker	100 yd	Alfred Shrubb	4 yd
120yd hurdles	(United States) Alvin Kraenzlein	15.6	Alfred Trafford	4½ yd	(United States) Irving Baxter	
2 miles walk	(Leinster) George Deyermond	14:17.4	H. T. Simpson	5 yd	W. H. Martindale	8 yd
7 miles walk	Jack Butler	54:37.0	H. T. Simpson	55:40.0	W. H. Martindale	56:30.0
high jump	(United States) Irving Baxter	1.803	(Leinster) Peter O'Connor	1.753	only 2 competitors	
pole jump	(United States) Irving Baxter; W. H. Hodgson	2.99; 2.99	not awarded		only 2 competitors	
long jump	(Leinster) Peter O'Connor	7.22	not awarded		only 1 competitor	
shot put	(United States) Wesley Coe	13.85	not awarded		only 1 competitor	
hammer throw	(Leinster) Tom Kiely	45.28	Ernest May	36.66	Henry Alan Leeke	35.06
