= Athletics at the 1900 Summer Olympics – Men's triple jump =

Athletics at the Olympics

Men's triple jump at the Games of the II Olympiad
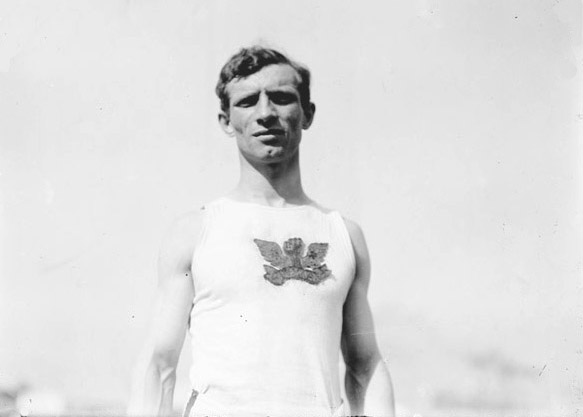
- Myer Prinstein
- Venue: Bois de Boulogne
- Dates: July 16, 1900
- Competitors: 13 from 6 nations
- Winning distance: 14.47 OR

Medalists
1st place, gold medalist(s)		Myer Prinstein; United States
2nd place, silver medalist(s)		James Brendan Connolly; United States
3rd place, bronze medalist(s)		Lewis Sheldon; United States

The men's triple jump was a track & field athletics event at the 1900 Summer Olympics in Paris. It was held on July 16, 1900. 13 athletes from six nations competed. The event was won by Myer Prinstein of the United States, the nation's second consecutive victory in the men's triple jump. Prinstein became the first, and through the 2016 Games, only, person to have won both the long jump and the triple jump. James Brendan Connolly took second, making him the first man to medal twice in the triple jump (he had won in 1896). Lewis Sheldon finished third, completing what would later be known as a medal sweep.

== Background ==
This was the second appearance of the event, which is one of 12 athletics events to have been held at every Summer Olympics. James Brendan Connolly of the United States, the defending champion, was the only jumper to return after the 1896 Games. There was no favorite as "the event was rarely held at that time" and was not even on the original program.

Great Britain and Sweden each appeared for the first time in the event. France, Germany, Hungary, and the United States all appeared for the second time.

== Competition format ==
There was a single round of jumping.

== Records ==
These were the standing world and Olympic records (in metres) prior to the 1900 Summer Olympics.

World record	Matthew Roseingreue (GBR)	15.26(*)	Gort, United Kingdom of Great Britain and Ireland	28 April 1900
Olympic record	James Brendan Connolly (USA)	13.71	Athens, Greece	6 April 1896 (NS)

(*) unofficial

Myer Prinstein set a new Olympic record with 14.47 metres.

== Schedule ==
Date	Time	Round
Monday, 16 July 1900		Final

== Results ==
Prinstein defeated the defending champion Connolly to win the second Olympic triple jump competition. Distances for most of the competitors are unknown, as are placings after sixth.

Rank	Athlete	Nation	Distance	Notes
1st place, gold medalist(s)	Myer Prinstein	United States	14.47	OR
2nd place, silver medalist(s)	James Brendan Connolly	United States	13.97	
3rd place, bronze medalist(s)	Lewis Sheldon	United States	13.64	
4	Patrick Leahy	Great Britain	Unknown	
5	Albert Delannoy	France	Unknown	
6	Alexandre Tuffère	France	Unknown	
7–13	Daniel Horton	United States	Unknown	
7–13	Frank Jarvis	United States	Unknown	
7–13	Pál Koppán	Hungary	Unknown	
7–13	Eric Lemming	Sweden	Unknown	
7–13	John McLean	United States	Unknown	
7–13	Karl Staaf	Sweden	Unknown	
7–13	Waldemar Steffen	Germany	Unknown	

== Sources ==
- International Olympic Committee.
- De Wael, Herman. Herman's Full Olympians: "Athletics 1900". Accessed 18 March 2006. Available electronically at.
- Mallon, Bill (1998). The 1900 Olympic Games, Results for All Competitors in All Events, with Commentary. Jefferson, North Carolina: McFarland & Company, Inc., Publishers. ISBN 0-7864-0378-0.
