= Waldemar Steffen =

German track and field athlete

Waldemar Joseph Carl Steffen (23 November 1872 in Hamburg – 12 February 1965 in Hamburg) was a German track and field athlete who competed at the 1900 Summer Olympics in Paris, France. He tied for fourth in the high jump, clearing 1.70 metres. Steffen competed in the long jump. He placed eighth of twelve with a best jump of 6.30 metres. He also competed in the triple jump, in which he failed to make the top six, and the standing triple jump, in which he did not place in the top four.
