= Swimming Australia Hall of Fame =

The Swimming Australia Hall of Fame was established in 2022 by Swimming Australia "to both recognise and celebrate those athletes and coaches who have left an indelible mark on the sport at the international level." The inaugural inductees were Fred Lane, Fanny Durack, Dawn Fraser, Shane Gould and Ian Thorpe.

== Induction criteria ==
- "an athlete must have been retired from international competition for at least 5 years and won at least 1 individual Olympic or Paralympic Gold Medal, or multiple FINA or Para World Championships, or Commonwealth Games Gold Medals."
- "for coaches, elevation to the Hall of Fame can happen at anytime where a coach has provided long and dedicated service to the Dolphins team, has coached an athlete to at least 1 individual Olympic or Paralympic Gold Medal, or multiple FINA or Para World Championships, or Commonwealth Games Gold Medals, and is highly regarded amongst their peers."
- "both athletes and coaches must also have brought significant international standing to swimming in Australia through their achievements and service."

== Inductees ==
Year	Athletes	Ref.
2022	Fred Lane, Fanny Durack, Dawn Fraser, Shane Gould & Ian Thorpe	
2023	Lorraine Crapp, Murray Rose & Susie O'Neill	
2024	Boy Charlton, Priya Cooper & Kieren Perkins	
2025	Frank Beaurepaire, Michelle Ford-Eriksson, David Theile & Matt Cowdrey	
