= Athletics at the 1900 Summer Olympics – Men's high jump =

Men's high jump at the Games of the II Olympiad
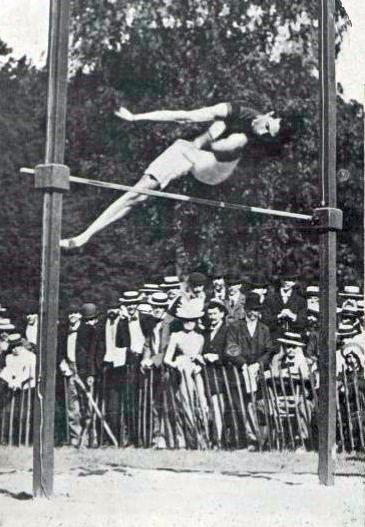
- Irving Baxter jumping
- Venue: Bois de Boulogne
- Date: July 15, 1900
- Competitors: 8 from 7 nations
- Winning height: 1.90 OR

Medalists
| 1st place, gold medalist(s) | | Irving Baxter; United States |
| 2nd place, silver medalist(s) | | Patrick Leahy; Great Britain |
| 3rd place, bronze medalist(s) | | Lajos Gönczy; Hungary |

The men's high jump was a track & field athletics event at the 1900 Summer Olympics in Paris. It was held on July 15, 1900. Eight athletes from seven nations competed in the high jump. The event was won by Irving Baxter of the United States, the nation's second consecutive victory in the men's high jump. Great Britain (Patrick Leahy's silver) and Hungary (Lajos Gönczy's bronze) each took medals in their first appearance in the event.

== Background ==
This was the second appearance of the event, which is one of 12 athletics events to have been held at every Summer Olympics. None of the jumpers from 1896 returned. Irving Baxter of the United States was the 1900 AAA champion, while Patrick Leahy of Great Britain had won in 1898 and 1899.

France, Great Britain, Hungary, and Norway each competed for the first time in the event. Germany, Sweden, and the United States all appeared for the second time.

== Competition format ==
There was a single round of jumping. The bar started at 1.50 metres. When the victor was the only man left, he was able to choose the height.

== Records ==
These were the standing world and Olympic records (in metres) prior to the 1900 Summer Olympics.

| World record | Michael Sweeney (USA) | 1.97(*) | New York, United States | 21 September 1895 |
| Olympic record | Ellery Clark (USA) | 1.81 | Athens, Greece | 10 April 1896 (NS) |

(*) unofficial

Irving Baxter improved the Olympic record twice. At first he jumped 1.85 metres and finally he also cleared 1.90 metres.

== Schedule ==
The Sunday schedule prevented two Americans, William Remington and Walter Carroll, from competing.

| Date | Time | Round |
|---|---|---|
| Sunday, 15 July 1900 | 15:45 | Final |

== Results ==
Key

- o = Height cleared
- x = Height failed
- – = Height passed
- r = Retired
- SB = Season's best
- PB = Personal best
- NR = National record
- AR = Area record
- OR = Olympic record
- WR = World record
- WL = World lead
- NM = No mark
- DNS = Did not start
- DQ = Disqualified

Baxter won easily, clearing 1.85 metres and 1.90 metres. With no one else close, he attempted to break the world record, 1.97 metres at the time. He failed all three times he attempted it, but still took the gold medal. Jump sequences are known only for Baxter's jumps at 1.85 metres and above.

| Place | Athlete | Nation | 1.50 | 1.60 | 1.70 | 1.75 | 1.78 | 1.80 | 1.85 | 1.90 | 1.98 | Height | Notes |
|---|---|---|---|---|---|---|---|---|---|---|---|---|---|
| 1st place, gold medalist(s) | Irving Baxter | United States | o | o | o | o | o | o | o | o | xxx | 1.90 | OR |
| 2nd place, silver medalist(s) | Patrick Leahy | Great Britain | o | o | o | o | o | x | — | | | 1.78 | |
| 3rd place, bronze medalist(s) | Lajos Gönczy | Hungary | o | o | o | o | x | — | | | | 1.75 | |
| 4 | Carl Albert Andersen | Norway | o | o | o | x | — | | | | | 1.70 | |
| 4 | Eric Lemming | Sweden | o | o | o | x | — | | | | | 1.70 | |
| 4 | Waldemar Steffen | Germany | o | o | o | x | — | | | | | 1.70 | |
| 7 | Louis Monnier | France | o | o | x | — | | | | | | 1.60 | |
| 8 | Tore Blom | Sweden | o | x | — | | | | | | | 1.50 | |

== Sources ==
- International Olympic Committee.
- De Wael, Herman. Herman's Full Olympians: "Athletics 1900". Accessed 18 March 2006. Available electronically at.
- Mallon, Bill (1998). The 1900 Olympic Games, Results for All Competitors in All Events, with Commentary. Jefferson, North Carolina: McFarland & Company, Inc., Publishers. ISBN 0-7864-0378-0.
