= Léon Monnier =

French high jumper

Léon Monnier (6 January 1883 in Paris – 26 August 1969 in Morainvilliers) was a French track and field athlete who competed at the 1900 Summer Olympics in Paris, France. Monnier competed in the high jump, finishing seventh of eight with a best jump of 1.60 metres.

== Sources ==
- De Wael, Herman. Herman's Full Olympians: "Athletics 1900". Accessed 18 March 2006. Available electronically at .
- Mallon, Bill (1998). The 1900 Olympic Games, Results for All Competitors in All Events, with Commentary. Jefferson, North Carolina: McFarland & Company, Inc., Publishers. ISBN 0-7864-0378-0.
