= Tore Blom =

Swedish track and field athlete

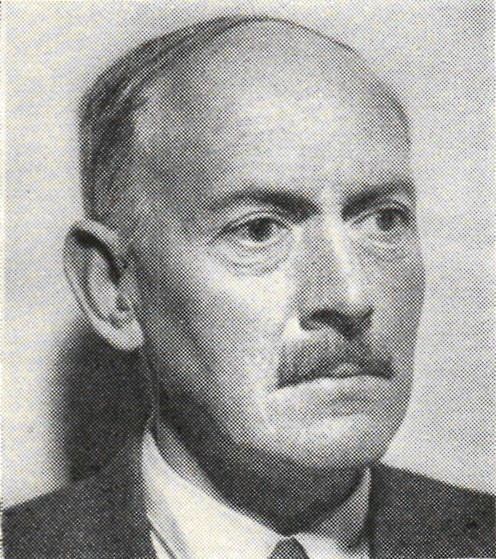
Tore Blom before 1935

Teodor "Tore" Blom (April 23, 1880 in Lilla Edet – September 24, 1961 in Bromma, Stockholm) was a Swedish track and field athlete who competed at the 1900 Summer Olympics in Paris, France.

Blom competed in the long jump and the high jump. In the former he placed eleventh of twelve with a distance of 5.770 metres while in the latter he took last of eight jumpers clearing 1.50 metres.
