= Julius Frey =

German swimmer

Personal information
- Born: October 25, 1881 Stuttgart, German Empire
- Died: August 28, 1960 (aged 78) Stuttgart, West Germany

Sport
- Sport: Swimming
Medal record
Representing Germany
Olympic Games
Gold medal – first place	1900 Paris	200 m team

Julius Frey (25 October 1881 – 28 August 1960) was a German swimmer who competed in the Swimming at the 1900 Summer Olympics. He was a member of the German swimming team, which won the gold medal at the Paris event. He also competed in the 200 metre freestyle event and finished eighth.
