= Athletics at the 1900 Summer Olympics – Men's standing high jump =

Athletics at the Olympics

Men's standing high jump at the Games of the II Olympiad
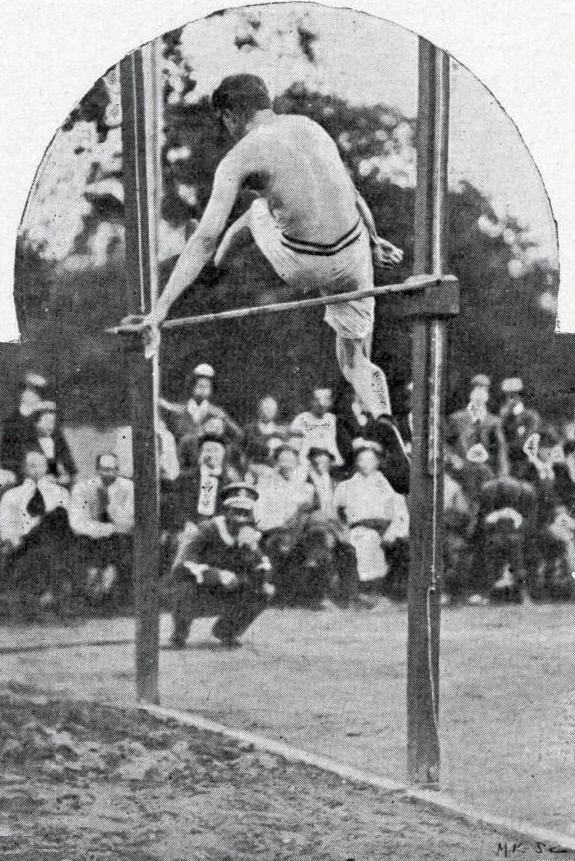
- Ray Ewry competing
- Venue: Bois de Boulogne
- Date: July 16, 1900
- Competitors: 3 from 1 nation
- Winning height: 1.655 WR

Medalists
1st place, gold medalist(s)		Ray Ewry; United States
2nd place, silver medalist(s)		Irving Baxter; United States
3rd place, bronze medalist(s)		Lewis Sheldon; United States

The men's standing high jump was a track & field athletics event at the 1900 Summer Olympics in Paris. It was held on July 16, 1900. Three athletes, all from the United States, competed in the standing high jump. The event was won by Ray Ewry of the United States, who took gold in all three of the standing jumps in 1900 (and in both that remained on the programme in each of the 1904, 1906 Intercalated, and 1908 Games). His teammate Irving Baxter earned silver in all three 1900 standing jumps. The American sweep (guaranteed with only Americans competing) was completed with Lewis Sheldon taking bronze.

== Background ==
This was the first appearance of the event, which was held four times from 1900 to 1912.

== Competition format ==
There was a single round of jumping.

== Records ==
This was a new event with no standing Olympic record. The world record prior to the Games is not clear, though Ray Ewry is credited with breaking it both at 1.63 metres and again at 1.655 metres.

== Schedule ==
Date	Time	Round
Monday, 16 July 1900		Final

== Results ==
Ewry had little difficulty winning this event, setting a world record at 1.630 metres and then another at 1.655 metres, also the first Olympic record.

Rank	Athlete	Nation	Height	Notes
1st place, gold medalist(s)	Ray Ewry	United States	1.655	WR
2nd place, silver medalist(s)	Irving Baxter	United States	1.525	
3rd place, bronze medalist(s)	Lewis Sheldon	United States	1.500	

== Sources ==
- International Olympic Committee.
- De Wael, Herman. Herman's Full Olympians: "Athletics 1900". Accessed 18 March 2006. Available electronically at.
- Mallon, Bill (1998). The 1900 Olympic Games, Results for All Competitors in All Events, with Commentary. Jefferson, North Carolina: McFarland & Company, Inc., Publishers. ISBN 0-7864-0378-0.
