= Ernő Schubert =

Hungarian track and field athlete

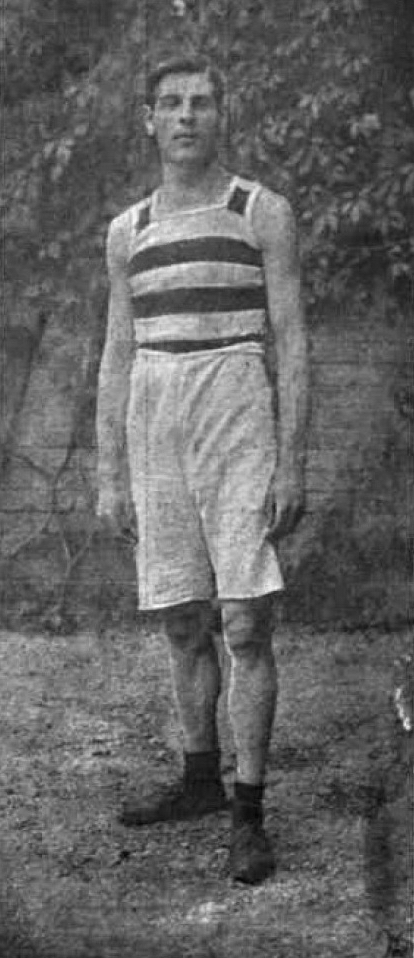
Ernő Schubert at an athletics competition in Prague, 1901

Ernő Schubert (July 4, 1881 – February 9, 1931) was a Hungarian track and field athlete who competed at the 1900 Summer Olympics. He was born and died in Budapest. He participated in the 60 metres competition, in the 100 metres competition, and in the 200 metres competition. But in every event he was eliminated in the first round. In the long jump competition he finished ninth with a distance of 6.050 metres.
