= Gyula Strausz =

Hungarian track and field athlete

Gyula László János Strausz (26 February 1880 – 18 March 1949 in Budapest) was a Hungarian track and field athlete who competed at the 1900 Summer Olympics. He participated in the discus throw competition and finished fourteenth and in the long jump competition where he finished tenth with a distance of 6.010 metres.
