= Josiah McCracken =

American athlete (1874–1962)

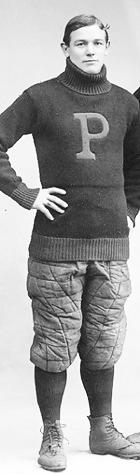

Biographical details
- Born: March 30, 1874; Lincoln County, Tennessee, U.S.
- Died: February 15, 1962 (aged 87); Philadelphia, Pennsylvania, U.S.

Playing career

Football
- 1897–1900: Penn
- Position: Halfback

Coaching career (HC unless noted)
- 1903: Cooper

Head coaching record
- Overall: 2–5

Accomplishments and honors

Awards
- Consensus All-American (1899); Second-team All-American (1898); 2× Third-team All-American (1897, 1900)
Medal record
Men's athletics
Representing the United States
Olympic Games
Silver medal – second place	1900 Paris	Shot put
Bronze medal – third place	1900 Paris	Hammer throw

Josiah Calvin McCracken (March 30, 1874 – February 15, 1962) was an American football player and track and field athlete.

== Early life: football and track achievements ==
McCracken, nicknamed Joe, was born in Lincoln County, Tennessee. His earliest known Ulster-Scots ancestors settled in Pennsylvania before the French and Indian War. When McCracken was eight years old, his parents moved to Garnett, Kansas, and by the age of 17, the family was living in Sterling, Kansas. McCracken excelled at both football and track and field while a school boy in Kansas. He was heavily recruited by the University of Kansas, Cornell University, and the University of Pennsylvania. The 1896 Kansas Jayhawks football team was coached was Hector Cowan a Princeton University graduate, an 1889 All-America college football team selection, and a future member of the College Football Hall of Fame. In addition to coaching football, Cowan was a Presbyterian minister. McCracken was raised in a devout Presbyterian family. After living on the plains of Kansas for 14 years, McCracken transferred in 1896 from Cooper College, a Presbyterian institution known today as Sterling College, along with University of Kansas transfer John Outland, to attend the University of Pennsylvania and played football under future College Football Hall of Fame coach George Washington Woodruff. Both McCracken and Outland graduated from Penn with degrees in medicine. Unlike Cornell and Penn, the University of Kansas did not have a medical school in 1896.

While at Penn, McCracken was an all around student athlete, playing varsity football four years, track four years (captain his senior year) and was a member of the gymnastics team. McCracken was named to Walter Camp's College All American football team on three occasions. He was a third-team All American in 1897; a second-team All American in 1898 and in 1899 a first-team All American. McCracken played primarily as an offensive fullback and defensive guard. During 1899 he played alongside Outland and A. R. Kennedy, another transfer students from the University of Kansas football program. McCracken, Outland and Kennedy were known around Philadelphia's Franklin Field as the "Kansas Musketeers". During McCracken's four years of playing football at Penn (1897–1900) the football team compiled a 47–5–2 record.

On May 31, 1898, McCracken set a world record in the hammer throw with a distance of 46.83 m (153–8 ft) at a meet in New Jersey. After college, he won a silver and bronze medal at the 1900 Summer Olympics in Paris.

McCracken was elected president of his class all four years at Penn, was president of the Christian Association three years, president of the Houston Club one year, and an associate editor of the student newspaper, The Pennsylvanian. A New York Times article of April 11, 1901 described him as "the University of Pennsylvania's best all around athlete and the most popular man at the university..." When McCracken graduated in 1901 with his medical degree and received his diploma, the whole audience rose to their feet and loudly applauded, an ovation never before given in the history of the university.

== 1900 Olympics ==
McCracken demonstrating a shot put (top) and discus throw (bottom), in motion studies by Étienne-Jules Marey

McCracken's previous world record in the hammer throw earned him a spot on the U.S. Olympic team and a trip to the 1900 Summer Olympics in Paris. During the Paris Olympics, The New York Times reported on July 16, 1900, that the French Olympic Committee had shifted several final events to Sunday and that American athletes including Josiah McCracken from Penn and Robert Garrett from Princeton University refused for religious reasons to compete in any Olympic events that were scheduled on Sunday. McCracken and Garrett were replaced with athletes from Hungary and Greece. Richard Sheldon also representing the US, elected to participate on Sunday and won the gold medal in the shot put. Fortunately, McCracken's and Garrett's Saturday qualifying results in the shot put were good enough to earn them silver and bronze medals respectively in the shot put event. McCracken also received the bronze medal in the hammer throw.

== Later life ==
After graduating from the University of Pennsylvania School of Medicine, McCracken remained involved in college football as both a game official and coach. During his medical residency and internship period, McCracken was a football referee, linesman or time-keeper for many Ivy League varsity games, including the Harvard vs. Yale games of 1902 and 1904. In 1903, he returned to Kansas for one season as the Cooper College football coach. McCracken Field at Sterling College's Smisor Stadium is named in his honor. Also in 1903, three Penn 1900 Olympic athletes— Alexander Grant, George W. Orton and Joe McCracken—established Camp Tecumseh, a residential summer camp in New Hampshire for young men. The camp's mission now as it was then, is "to make good boys better" through healthy athletic competition.

McCracken completed his medical internship at Columbia University and his medical residency at the University of Pennsylvania Hospital. In 1906, the University of Pennsylvania Christian Association sent McCracken to China to establish a Christian medical school in Canton. McCracken served as president of the University Medical School in Canton from 1907 to 1913 and then as dean of the University of Pennsylvania Medical School of China (later part of St. John's University in Shanghai) from 1914 to 1942. McCracken spent a total of 36 years in China training Chinese doctors and improving existing medical schools. When the Japanese occupied China in 1942, McCracken and his family were expelled and placed aboard an Italian ship in Shanghai. Their escape from China required the assistance of the Swiss Consulate. Their passage home took them down the coast of southeastern Asia, across the Indian Ocean to Mozambique, Africa. In Mozambique they were transferred to a Swedish ship that took them around the Cape of Good Hope to Rio de Janeiro, Brazil, and finally to New York. During World War II McCracken served as a Major in the U.S. Public Health Reserves. Joe's wife Helen and his daughter Mary both died in the United States during the war. After the war McCracken returned to Shanghai for another year before having to return to the United States for health reasons. During retirement McCracken continued to raise funds for the hospitals and medical schools in China until the takeover in 1952 by the communist government.

The McCrackens had eight children, seven whom were born in China. A son of Joe and Helen, Josiah C. McCracken Jr., was a Penn football running back in the 1930s, whose nickname was the "Shanghai Express." During World War II Joe Jr. rose to the rank of Major in the U.S. Army Medical Corps and received the Bronze Star for his service in the southwest Pacific.

In May 1952 Joe Sr. returned to Kansas to visit relatives and the graves of his parents. While in Sterling he decided to sell his parents' farm. He donated the proceeds from the sale of the family farm to Sterling College in appreciation for what the school had done for him and other young people since then.

Joe McCracken Sr. died in Chestnut Hill, Philadelphia, on February 15, 1962, at nearly 88 years of age, and is buried alongside his wife Helen and daughter Dr. Mary McCracken in Woodlawn Cemetery, Bronx, NY. Also buried in Woodlawn Cemetery are several of his distant relatives who had changed the spelling of the McCracken surname to MacCracken, including Henry Mitchell MacCracken, Chancellor of New York University, who conceived the idea of a Hall of Fame for Great Americans; and his sons Henry Noble MacCracken, President of Vassar College; and John Henry MacCracken, President of Lafayette College.

On May 23, 1956, Joe was elected to the University of Pennsylvania Track Hall of Fame. On November 11, 2000, he was inducted into the University of Pennsylvania Athletic Hall of Fame.

In 2008, the University of Pennsylvania Christian Association established the Dr. Josiah C. McCracken Society.

In 2010, McCracken was nominated for induction into the Kansas Sports Hall of Fame so he could take his place alongside the other two Kansas Musketeers Kennedy and Outland who had been inducted in 1974.
