= Fred Hendschel =

American swimmer

Personal information
- Full name: Frederick Hendschel
- Nickname: "Fred"
- National team: United States
- Born: August 9, 1879 Innleiten, Rosenheim, Germany
- Died: February 14, 1916 (aged 36) Manhattan, New York, U.S.

Sport
- Sport: Swimming
- Strokes: Freestyle
- Club: New York Athletic Club

Frederick Hendschel (August 9, 1879 – February 14, 1916) was a German-born American competition swimmer who represented the United States at the 1900 Summer Olympics in Paris. Hendschel competed in the semifinals of the men's 200-meter freestyle and the men's 200-meter obstacle course.

== Publications ==
- Fred Hendschel "Ribbon Clasp" US Patent D41359; Filing date: December 3, 1910; Issue date: May 9, 1911.
