= Thaddeus McClain =

American sprinter

Thaddeus Brew McClain (September 10, 1876 in Milesburg, Pennsylvania – April 21, 1935 in Conewango, New York) was an American track and field athlete who competed at the 1900 Summer Olympics in Paris, France.

McClain competed in the 100 metres event, placing between 7th and 9th overall. He took second in both his first round heat and his semifinal, qualifying him for the repechage. There, he placed in the bottom half of the six-man field and did not qualify for the final.

He also competed in the 200 metre hurdles, placing third in his semifinal heat and not advancing to the final. He did not finish the 4000 metre steeplechase.

His jump of 6.435 metres was good for seventh place in the long jump.
