= Artúr Coray =

Hungarian athlete

Artúr Balthazár Coray (16 July 1881 in Budapest – 27 February 1909 in Muralto) was a Hungarian track and field athlete who competed at the 1900 Summer Olympics in Paris, France.

Coray competed in the shot put event. He placed seventh with a best throw of 11.13 metres. In the discus throw competition, Coray placed eleventh with a best throw of 31.00 metres.

He gave up sports in 1905 due to pulmonary disease and died in 1909.
