= Mary Elizabeth McCracken =

American medical missionary

Dr. Mary Elizabeth McCracken
- Born: February 2, 1911; Canton, China
- Died: October 19, 1945 (aged 34)
- Education: A.D. Lake Erie College, MA University of Pennsylvania, MD St. John's University

Mary Elizabeth McCracken (February 2, 1911 – October 19, 1945) was a medical missionary who was also the first woman to overcome infantile paralysisMcCracken worked alongside her father, athlete and physician Josiah McCracken, to perform surgery on citizens affected by the Sino-Japanese conflict in Shanghai. She also headed the pediatrics department of her father's Refugee Hospital for many years.

McCracken was often referred to as the "indomitable Mary" for persevering to the end and not letting her paralysis hinder her service.

== Background ==
=== Childhood ===
Mary Elizabeth McCracken was born on February 2, 1911, in Canton, China where her parents, Josiah Calvin McCracken and Helen Newpher McCracken,were stationed as medical missionaries. Her parents were known as the "McCrackens of Shanghai". McCracken was the third of eight children. She had five sisters (Helen McCracken Fulcher, Margaret McCracken, Martha Constance McCracken Howard, Elsie McCracken, and Ruth McCracken) and two brothers (Josiah C. McCracken and Stewart McCracken). At the young age of thirteen months, McCracken was affected by infantile paralysis. She could not walk and constantly needed to be carried everywhere. McCracken's mother graduated with a degree in physical education from Columbia University, and she persistently cared for her daughter and sought to make her life as normal as possible.

As a child, McCracken enjoyed music and sang with her family. She knew how to play piano, as all the children in her family were taught by their mother. As a child, she enjoyed playing with Kewpie dolls and creating paper doll families with her older sisters. Though she faced many challenges due to her condition, McCracken was always a good sport. In sports events that required physical movement, she could not play with her siblings and instead took on the role of timekeeper.

=== Education ===
In the fall of 1916, McCracken began school at the Shanghai American School, a private school that was two to three blocks away from the family's residence at 8 Darroch Road in Shanghai. She was pulled everyday to school in a long wagon by her mother. As McCracken had to be carried to class and recess, her mother often had to be present to perform such a duty.

After the family moved to the United States in 1920, finding a school for McCracken proved challenging. Only when a druggist from the neighborhood allowed an employee to carry McCracken was she able to finally attend a school. Eventually, in 1924, she went to the Watson Home in Pittsburgh, Pennsylvania for both treatment and schooling. She stayed there until she completed high school.

In the fall of 1927, McCracken followed in her older sister Helen's footsteps and attended Lake Erie College. She roomed with Helen the first year and her other sister Margaret for the following two years. Her sisters helped with her wheelchair and carried her during these times. The college faculty was very interested in McCracken and her attitude towards learning. McCracken developed a liking for history, learned how to swim, and joined the archery team during college.

After graduating from Lake Erie College, McCracken went on to study at the University of Pennsylvania. She studied biology and received her Master of Arts in Anatomy.

As she told her father she was interested in attending medical school, he invited her to study under him in China. She ended up attending Women's Christian Medical College in Shanghai. She did so well in anatomy that the second year she was at the school she taught the subject herself. McCracken later transferred to St. John's University, continuing to teach anatomy. She completed a year of internship at the Refugee Hospital and then received her graduation diploma at the head of her class in 1939.

=== Treatments ===
McCracken struggled against infantile paralysis all of her life. With a physician as a father and physical therapist as a mother, McCracken was not left alone to tackle this disease. Her entire family including her brothers and sisters took part in helping McCracken move from place to place. During college at Lake Erie College, her older sisters Helen and Margaret carried her throughout the day across campus to her classes.

Initially after McCracken was struck with this disease, her mother did her best to treat her but this was not enough. Reaching out to his friend, her father sought out consultation from Dr. Abraham Flexner in 1915. In 1916, McCracken and her father traveled to Boston so she could receive care to straighten her back.

In February 1919, McCracken began to go to the Red Cross Hospital in Shanghai to receive electrical treatments three times per week. She had to be brought home early to rest before every treatment, thus, she had to leave school early for each treatment. Though McCracken broke her leg in December 1919, she still persisted in attending school in her cast. In February 1921, the family made the decision to send McCracken to the Watson Home for crippled children in Pittsburgh, Pennsylvania to receive care under Dr. David Silvers. This is where she ended up for her entire high school career. Though the family returned to Shanghai on June 23, 1921, McCracken wasn't able to improve in Shanghai and made the decision to return in the summer of 1923 to the Watson Home.

In 1934, McCracken attended medical school and was able to use her own rickshaw and coolie. This allowed for greater independence for her as she went to school and made new friends. Being the “indomitable Mary,” she was an independent person, never letting others perform any task for her if she could do it herself.

== Mission Work ==
=== Motivation for Medical Missions ===
With a medical missionary upbringing, McCracken was able to see all the facets of the missionary life. Her life was split between time in Shanghai and the United States. She became used to being apart from her parents when she was seeking education in the United States while her parents stayed in Shanghai to serve. She knew that her parents wouldn't be able to make it to many important life events including her graduation or the weddings of her siblings.

Despite all this, she understood the importance of her parents' roles and the impact that the "McCrackens of Shanghai" had. This motivated McCracken to follow in her father's footsteps to pursue a medical degree and become a medical missionary in China. To McCracken, her fight against infantile paralysis transformed from a part of her that she had to deal with into a trait she could overcome or even leverage to become the medical missionary she hoped to be for the Chinese children.

=== Service in Shanghai ===
After McCracken's internship at the Refugee Hospital, she stayed one more year to work in the pediatrics department. By this time, she ran the pediatrics department at the hospital. During the Sino-Japanese War, she worked with the Red Cross to gain access to powdered milk for the refugee babies she took care of. McCracken used most of her own money to buy medicines and supplies, like soybean powdered milk—a more superior supplement than just powdered milk, for "her children".

Specializing in pediatrics, McCracken returned to the United States to work in the Children's Hospital of Philadelphia to gain more experience. She finished her work at the Children's Hospital on July 1, 1941. After her time at the Children's Hospital, she hoped to return to China. Returning was harder now because the Chinese had just banned “all women and useless men.” Despite this, McCracken was determined to return.

By seeking out her father's second cousin, Dr. Henry Noble McCracken, president of Vassar College whom had relations with President Franklin D. Roosevelt, McCracken was able to get her passport approved. One reason she was able to receive her visa was because President Roosevelt himself was diagnosed with infantile paralysis too. After receiving approval, she headed back to the Refugee Hospital, where her father was in charge, to take the lead of pediatrics department again.

When she returned her father noted a few differences about the way she worked. She didn't seek to abide by her father's hospital rules anymore, though she previously was most obedient. She was also overly cautious about not wasting anything—drinking even the residual milk in a cup after rinsing it with water. She wanted to use all of her resources most effectively to be able to serve the children the best that she could—never thinking of herself even though she constantly struggled with her disability.

=== Homecoming of the McCrackens ===
Though McCracken was born in Shanghai and served for the most part in China, she also spent a large amount of time in the United States for schooling or treatment. Where home was for the McCrackens gradually became more and more unclear, especially since the siblings were constantly scattered and split between the two countries.

On December 8, 1941, the Chinese Nationalist Government overtook the hospital and told the McCrackens to leave; in addition, McCracken's condition and her father's health were slowly worsening. As a result, in 1942, McCracken left China with her parents on the Italian ship Contri Verde. On the ship, she became bedridden with meningitis and was checked into a hospital when she arrived in the United States. McCracken died on October 18, 1945.

== Legacy ==
McCracken followed in her father's footsteps to become a medical missionary despite her battle with infantile paralysis all her life. She graduated medical school at the top of her class and became a pediatrician who served the Chinese people in Shanghai. McCracken was the only woman who earned a medical degree from St. John's University. She was often referred to as the "indomitable Mary" as she persevered until the end and did not let her disabilities hinder her service.

In honor of McCracken and as a memorial to his daughter, Josiah Calvin McCracken created the Mary E. McCracken Fund to further Mary Elizabeth's service to the Chinese. The fund named specifically after her was used to benefit the children in China whom Mary cared dearly for. As a result of her family's service in Shanghai, the McCrackens will always be known as the "McCrackens of Shanghai" for their service during such challenging times in China.

On her gravestone in the Woodlawn Cemetery in Bronx, New York, the phrase "Beloved Physician" is engraved.
