= Daniel Horton (pole vaulter) =

American track and field athlete

Daniel Slawson Horton (December 24, 1879 – November 4, 1954) was an American track and field athlete who competed at the 1900 Summer Olympics in Paris, France. He was born and died in New York City.

Horton competed in the triple jump. His place and distance are unknown, though he did not finish in the top six. Similarly, he did not make the top four in the standing triple jump.

Although Horton's only official Olympic appearance was in the triple jump, he was primarily a pole vaulter. He was set to compete in the 1900 Olympic pole vault, but he skipped the Sunday finals for sabbatical reasons along with several other American vaulters, believing that a follow-up competition on Monday would be held and marks would be compared to determine medals.

Subsequent competitions were held on Monday and Thursday by the French organizers, but they were never considered official Olympic events by them at the time, and the medallists from the Sunday event stood. Nonetheless, Horton won the 19 July competition on Thursday, with a vault of 3.45 metres that was higher than that of the Olympic gold medallist Irving Baxter (3.30 m). His personal best in the pole vault was 3.52 m.
