= Rezső Crettier =

Hungarian athlete

Rezső Xavier Ferencz Lipot Sándor Crettier (15 November 1878 – 8 March 1945) was a Hungarian track and field athlete who competed at the 1900 Summer Olympics. He participated in the discus throw competition and finished fifth and in the shot put competition where he finished fourth. He was born in Budapest, Austria-Hungary.
