= Albert Delannoy =

French long jumper

Albert Léon Delannoy (13 February 1881 in Paris – 19 May 1944 in Paris) was a French long jumper who competed in the late 19th century and early 20th century. He participated in the triple jump event at the 1900 Summer Olympics in Paris and although finished third in the qualifying he finished in fifth place overall.
