= Pál Koppán =

Hungarian sprinter and triple jumper (1878 - 1951)

Jenö Pál Koppán (16 May 1878 in Budapest – 31 August 1951 in Budapest) was a Hungarian track and field athlete who competed at the 1900 Summer Olympics in Paris.

He participated in the 60 metres competition, in the 100 metres competition, and in the 400 metres competition. In all three events he was eliminated in the first round.

In the triple jump competition he finished between seventh and 13th place and in the standing triple jump competition he finished between fifth and tenth place. In both events the exact results are unknown.
