= Richard Sheldon (athlete) =

American athlete (1878–1935)

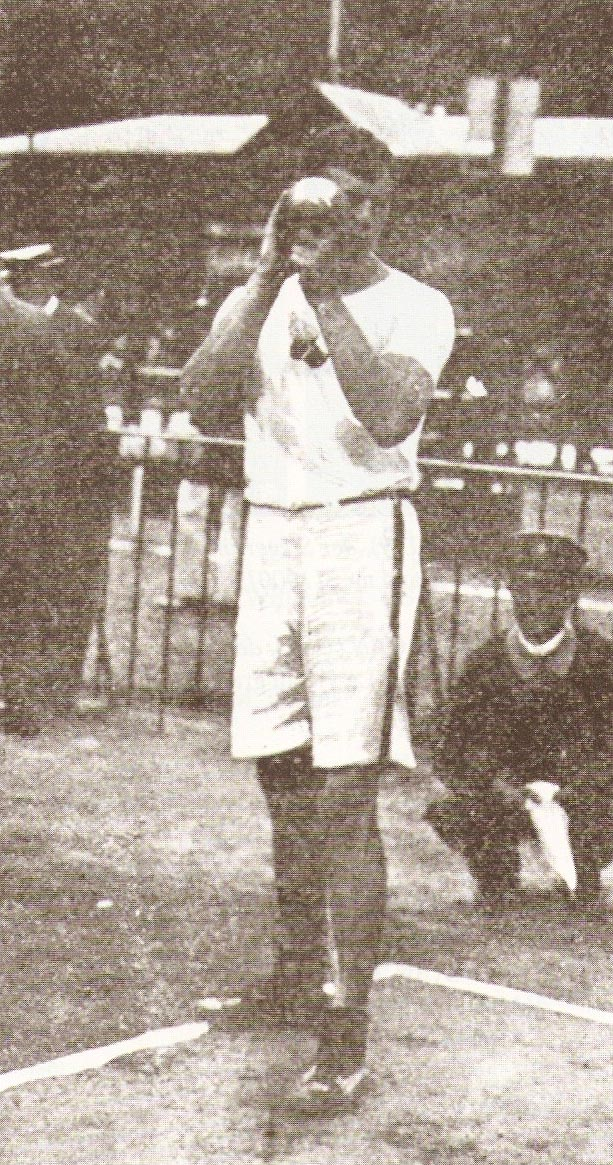

Personal information
- Born: July 9, 1878 Rutland, Vermont, U.S.
- Died: January 23, 1935 (aged 56) New York, U.S.

Sport
- Sport: Athletics
- Event: Shot / Discus / Hammer
- Club: NYAC
Medal record
Representing United States
Men's athletics
Olympic Games
Gold medal – first place	1900 Paris	Shot Put
Bronze medal – third place	1900 Paris	Discus

Richard Sheldon (July 9, 1878 in Rutland, Vermont – January 23, 1935 in New York), was the winner of the gold medal in the men's shot put at the 1900 Summer Olympics held in Paris, France.

== Biography ==
Sheldon finished second in the shot put and third in the hammer throw at the 1897 AAA Championships. He then won the shot put title at the British 1900 AAA Championships.

Shortly afterwards at the 1900 Summer Olympics, Sheldon won the shot put event with a throw of 14.10 m. He also won a bronze medal in the discus throw. Sheldon's brother Lewis Sheldon competed at the same Olympics, winning two bronze medals in jumping events.
