= Irving Baxter =

American athlete (1876–1957)

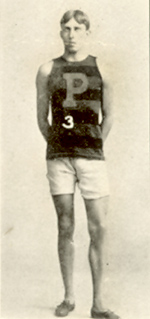

Personal information
- Born: March 25, 1876 Utica, New York, U.S.
- Died: June 13, 1957 (aged 81) Utica, New York, U.S.

Sport
- Sport: Athletics
- Event: high jump
- Club: Penn Quakers, Philadelphia
Medal record
Men's athletics
Representing the United States
Olympic Games
Gold medal – first place	1900 Paris	High jump
Gold medal – first place	1900 Paris	Pole vault
Silver medal – second place	1900 Paris	Standing high jump
Silver medal – second place	1900 Paris	Standing long jump
Silver medal – second place	1900 Paris	Standing triple jump

Irving Knott Baxter (March 25, 1876 in Utica, New York – June 13, 1957 in Utica, New York) was an American athlete, who won the gold medal in both the men's high jump and the pole vault at the 1900 Summer Olympics, in Paris, France.

== Biography ==
Baxter graduated from Trinity College in Hartford, CT in 1899 and the University of Pennsylvania School of Law in 1901.

Baxter won the high jump title at the British 1900 AAA Championships. Shortly afterwards, Baxter won the gold medal in both the men's high jump and the pole jump at the 1900 Summer Olympics and took second place to Ray Ewry in all three of the standing jumps (long, triple, and high) in 1900.

Baxter won further British AAA Championship titles, winning the high jump and pole jump events at the 1901 AAA Championships.

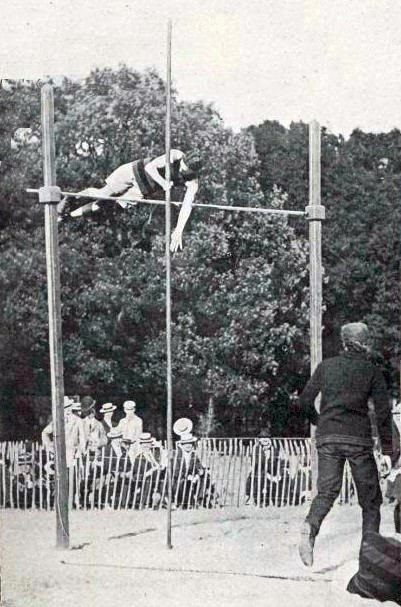
Irving Baxter pole vaulting at the 1900 Summer Olympics

Baxter is buried at Forest Hill Cemetery in Utica, New York.
