= Truxtun Hare =

American track and field Olympian

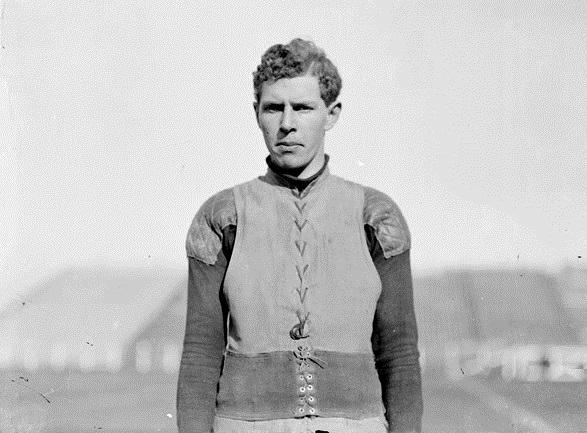
- Hare in 1904

Profile
- Position: Guard

Personal information
- Born: October 12, 1878; Philadelphia, Pennsylvania, U.S.
- Died: February 2, 1956 (aged 77); Radnor, Pennsylvania, U.S.
- Listed height: 6 ft 1 in (1.85 m)
- Listed weight: 198 lb (90 kg)

Career information
- High school: St. Mark's (Southborough, Massachusetts)
- College: Penn (1897–1900)

Awards and highlights
- 4× Consensus All-American (1897–1900); National champion (1897); Camp All-time All-America team; FWAA College Football All-Time team (1869–1919)
- College Football Hall of Fame (Class of 1951)

Medal record

Representing United States

Men's athletics

Representing the United States

Olympic Games
Silver medal – second place	1900 Paris	Hammer throw
Bronze medal – third place	1904 St Louis	All-around

Thomas Truxtun Hare (October 12, 1878 – February 2, 1956) was an American Olympic medalist who competed in track and field and the hammer throw. He also played football with the University of Pennsylvania and was selected first-team All-American all four years. Sports Illustrated wrote, "Few early 20th Century players were as revered as Hare, who played every minute of every game." He was selected as a charter member of the College Football Hall of Fame in 1951.

== Early life and education ==
Hare was born in Philadelphia, Pennsylvania. He was the son of Emily Power (née Beale) and Horace Binney Hare, a successful attorney. He came from a long line of lawyers. He attended St. Mark's School in Southborough, Massachusetts, where he graduated in 1897. There, he started in baseball, football, and track.

In the fall of 1897, Hare enrolled in the University of Pennsylvania, where he received a B.S. in 1901. There, he was a member of the Fraternity of Delta Psi (St. Anthony Hall), the Ancient and Honorable Order of the Sons of Rest, and the Sphinx Senior Society. He performed in plays with Mask and Wig, was vice president of the Cercle Francais and an assistant manager of the Musical Clubs. He was freshman class president and was elected as the Spoon Man his senior year.

At the University of Pennsylvania, Hare played on the varsity cricket team and the varsity track team, competing in jumper, runner, and weight thrower. The track team won their collegiate championships during his time. He also played on the Penn Quakers football team from 1897 to 1900 and served as team captain in his junior and senior years. He also played "every minute of every game for four years," helping his team win 32 consecutive games. He is one of only a handful of men to earn first-team All-American honors during all four years of college. While primarily a guard, he also called signals, kicked off, punted, ran, and drop-kicked extra points. Walter Camp said he could have been an All-American in any position.

He then enrolled in the University of Pennsylvania Law School, graduating with a law degree in 1903.

== Olympics ==
He won the silver medal in the hammer throw in the 1900 Summer Olympics held in Paris, as well as placing eighth in the shot put and competing without making a legal mark in the discus throw.

He competed for the United States in the 1904 Summer Olympics held in St. Louis, Missouri, in the all-rounder which consisted of ten events: 100 yd run, shot put, high jump, 880 yd walk, hammer throw, pole vault, 120 yd hurdles, 56 lb weight throw, long jump, and 1-mile run, where he won the bronze medal.

== Career ==
After graduating from law school, he practiced corporate law in Philadelphia. In 1913, he became an assistant solicitor for the United Gas Improvement Company, retaining this position until 1943.

He became the managing director and board member of Bryn Mawr Hospital in 1943. He replaced his brother, C. Willing Hare, who had died on December 6, 1942. In 1946, he was named president of the hospital. In this capacity, he oversaw the addition of a six-story wing, a $2.8 million project.

Hare also served as a director of the Philadelphia Contributionship for the Insurance Houses from Loss.

Starting in 1908, he authored two series of books for boys. His first series followed a journey from college football to coaching. The second series, followed the same character through prep school. He also published poetry books.

== Publications ==
=== Philip Kent, The College Athlete series ===
- Making the Freshman Team. Philadelphia: The Penn Publishing Company, 1908.
- A Sophomore Half-Back. Philadelphia: The Penn Publishing Company, 1908.
- A Junior in the Line. Philadelphia: The Penn Publishing Company, 1909.
- A Senior Quarterback. Philadelphia: The Penn Publishing Company, 1910.
- A Graduate Coach. Philadelphia: The Penn Publishing Company, 1911.

=== Philip Kent of Malvern series ===
- Philip Kent. Philadelphia: The Penn Publishing Company, 1914.
- Philip Kent in the Lower School. Philadelphia: The Penn Publishing Company, 1916.
- Philip Kent in the Upper School. Philadelphia: The Penn Publishing Company, 1918.
- Kent of Malvern. Philadelphia: The Penn Publishing Company, 1919.

== Awards and honors ==
- He was selected as a charter member of the College Football Hall of Fame in 1951 and was inducted in 1953.
- In an attempt to name retroactive Heisman Trophy winners before the first one was awarded in 1935, Hare was awarded the mythical 1900 trophy.
- He was named to the Helms Athletic Foundation's College Football Hall of Fame.
- The Helms Athletic Foundation named Hare the player of the year for 1900.
- In 1969, in honor of the centennial of collegiate football, the Football Writers Association of America named two "College Football All-Time Teams" of eleven players — an "early" team consisting of players who played prior to 1920, and a "modern" team who played in 1920 and after. Hare was chosen as one of two guards on the pre-1920 squad.

== Personal life ==
He married Katherine Sargent Smith, a Philadelphia socialite, in 1906. They had four children: Truxtun Jr., Tristan, Robert, Martha and Mrs. Frederic McLaughlin. They lived in Radnor, Pennsylvania, on a sixty-acre farm known as Limehouse.

During the 1930s, Hare chaired the University of Pennsylvania Athletic Advisory Board. He was also a member of the University of Pennsylvania Scholarship Committee. He was a vestryman and senior warden at St. Martin's Episcopal Church in Radnor.

He was president of the United Bowmen of America and a member of the Merian Cricket Club, the Philadelphia Club, the Racquet Club of Philadelphia, the St. Anthony Club of Philadelphia, and the University Barge Club. He was also a member of the Authors' League of America and the Pegasus Club. He was the founding president of the Business Men's Art Club in 1927, and his paintings and pottery was shown in exhibitions with the Art Club of Philadelphia.

In 1956, he died at his home on Weadley Road in Radnor at the age of 77 years.
