= Alvin Kraenzlein =

American track-and-field athlete (1876–1928)

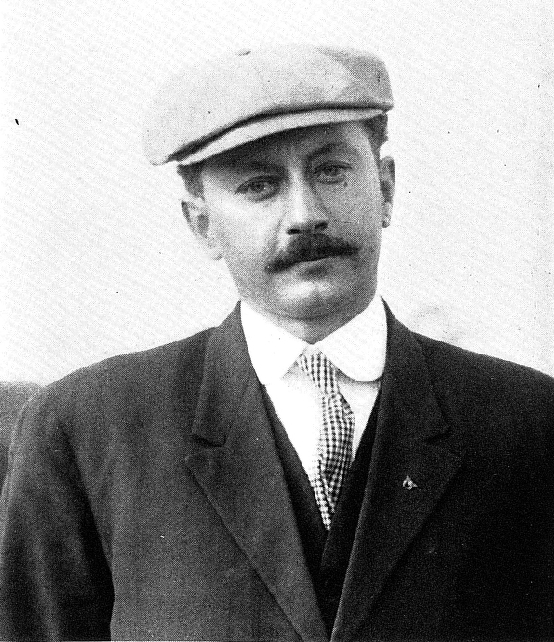
- Kraenzlein in 1911

Personal information
- Full name: Alvin Christian Kraenzlein
- Born: December 12, 1876 Minneapolis, Minnesota, U.S.
- Died: January 6, 1928 (aged 51) Wilkes-Barre, Pennsylvania, U.S.
- Occupation: Athletics competitor
Medal record
Men's athletics
Representing the United States
Olympic Games
| Gold medal – first place | 1900 Paris | 60 meters |
| Gold medal – first place | 1900 Paris | 110 meter hurdles |
| Gold medal – first place | 1900 Paris | 200 meter hurdles |
| Gold medal – first place | 1900 Paris | Long jump |

Alvin Christian "Al" Kraenzlein (December 12, 1876 – January 6, 1928) was an American track-and-field athlete known as "the father of the modern hurdling technique". He was the first sportsman in the history of the Olympic games to win four individual gold medals in a single discipline at the 1900 Summer Olympics in Paris. As of 2016, Alvin Kraenzlein is the only track-and-field athlete who has won four individual titles at one Olympics. Kraenzlein is also known for developing a pioneering technique of straight-leg hurdling, which allowed him to set two world hurdle records. He is an Olympic Hall of Fame (1984) and National Track and Field Hall of Fame (1974) inductee.

== Early years ==
Kraenzlein was born in Minneapolis, Minnesota, a son of Johann Georg Kränzlein, a brewer, and Maria Augusta Schmidt, both of German origin. After his family moved to Milwaukee, Wisconsin, he attended Milwaukee's East Side High School, where he became involved in sports. In 1895, during the Wisconsin Interscholastic Championships, he won first places in the 100-yard dash, 120-yard high hurdles, 220-yard low hurdles, high jump, and shot put.

He attended the University of Wisconsin where he studied engineering. In 1896, he won the 220-yard low hurdles, the high jump and placed second in the 100-yard dash and shot put at the freshman-sophomore track-and-field meet. During the 1897 Intercollegiate Athletic Conference Championship, Kraenzlein won the 220-yard low hurdles and the high jump. He led the Wisconsin team to the team title. He also won the 1897 Amateur Athletic Union (AAU) title in the 220-yard low hurdles. In 1897, Kraenzlein set an indoor world record of 36.6 seconds in the 300-yard low hurdles.

In 1898, after being recruited by Mike Murphy, the University of Pennsylvania track-and-field coach, he moved to Philadelphia, where he studied at the Dental School, graduating in 1900.

After winning his first national athletics title in 1897 – the 220 yards hurdles race at the AAU championship, Kraenzlein won five AAU titles in hurdling and long jump events, and eight Intercollegiate Association of Amateur Athletes of America titles in dash, hurdling, and the long jump. Being a student at Philadelphia University, he established world records for the 120 meter high hurdles and the 220 meter low hurdles, the last standing for quarter of a century. In 1899, Kraenzlein established the long jump world record of 24' 3 1/2". He was a leader of the Penn track-and-field team that won four consecutive team IC4A titles.

Kraenzlein was noted for his hurdling technique, as he was among the first to practice the modern method of straight-lead-leg (the first leg over the hurdle remains straight and parallel with the ground) hurdle clearing. Arthur Croome from Great Britain first attempted the straight-lead-leg style in 1886, however, Kraenzlein perfected it and turned into a mainstream technique. This was a significant development, as it enabled athletes to overcome the hurdles without reducing speed.

== The world's spotlight ==
Kraenzlein performing a hurdle jump in 1900

In 1900, Kraenzlein was training in England in preparation for the Paris Summer Olympics. He won the British Amateur Athletic Association Championships in London in the 120 yards hurdles and the long jump at the 1900 AAA Championships. before entering the 1900 Summer Olympics in Paris, where he established a world record in the 120 yards hurdles for grass tracks.

Kraenzlein became the most successful athlete of the 1900 Olympics. During three days of competitions there, he won four titles, establishing new Olympic record each time:

- 60-meters sprint (7.0 seconds)
- 110-meters high hurdles (15.4 seconds)
- 200-meters low hurdles (25.4 seconds)
- Long jump (7.185 m (23' 6 3/4"))

In the 60 meters, he ran both the preliminary and final in 7.0 seconds, defeating Walter Tewksbury by bare inches in the finals. In His victory in the long jump, Kraenzlein defeated silver medalist Meyer Prinstein, his great rival from Syracuse University, by a single centimeter. Prinstein's mark had been set in the qualification, and he did not attend the final, because it was held on a Sunday. It was said the two had an informal agreement not to compete on Sunday, and when Prinstein learned that Kraenzlein did show up he became violent, allegedly punching Kraenzlein according to some accounts (others claim that Prinstein was restrained before he could land the punch).

== Coaching ==
After the 1900 Olympic Games, Kraenzlein eased down from athletic competition in late 1900, as the owner of six world and four Olympic records. However, he did successfully defend his British AAA title over 120 yards hurdles at the 1901 AAA Championships.

He returned to Milwaukee and started a dental practice. He also became a manager of the Milwaukee Athletic Association. In 1902, having returned to Philadelphia, he married Claudine Gilman, whom he knew from his student days. He practiced dentistry in Philadelphia until 1906, when he became the track-and-field coach at Mercersburg Academy, a selective prep school in Pennsylvania. Among his students was Ralph Craig, a future Olympic titleholder in both the 100 and 200 meters in 1912 Olympic Games.

From 1910 to 1913 he was the head track-and-field and football coach (in 1910–1911) at the University of Michigan.

In 1913, he signed a five-year $50,000 contract with the German government to train the 1916 German Olympic track team (this was canceled because of the outbreak of World War I). With World War I coming, Kraenzlein served in the U.S. Army as a physical training specialist. When the war ended, he became an assistant coach for the University of Pennsylvania track team. He also coached at summer camps and at the Havana Golf and Tennis Club in Cuba in the winter.

In late 1927, he became affected by bouts of pleurisy. Kraenzlein died in early 1928 of endocarditis in Wilkes-Barre, Pennsylvania.

== See also ==
- List of multiple Olympic gold medalists at a single Games

| Preceded by Keene Fitzpatrick | Michigan Wolverines football trainer 1910–1911 | Succeeded by Stephen Farrell |
