= Lewis Sheldon =

American track and field athlete

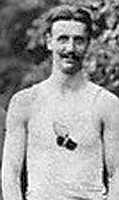

Medal record

Men's athletics

Representing the United States
Bronze medal – third place	1900 Paris	Triple jump
Bronze medal – third place	1900 Paris	Standing high jump

Lewis Pendleton Sheldon (June 9, 1874 in Rutland, Vermont – February 20, 1960 in Biarritz) was an American track and field athlete who competed in jumping events in the late 19th century and early 20th century. He participated in Athletics at the 1900 Summer Olympics in Paris and won bronze medals in triple jump and standing high jump, as well as fourth place in the standing long jump and standing triple jump. His brother is Richard Sheldon.
