= Long jump at the Olympics =

Long jump at the Olympic Games
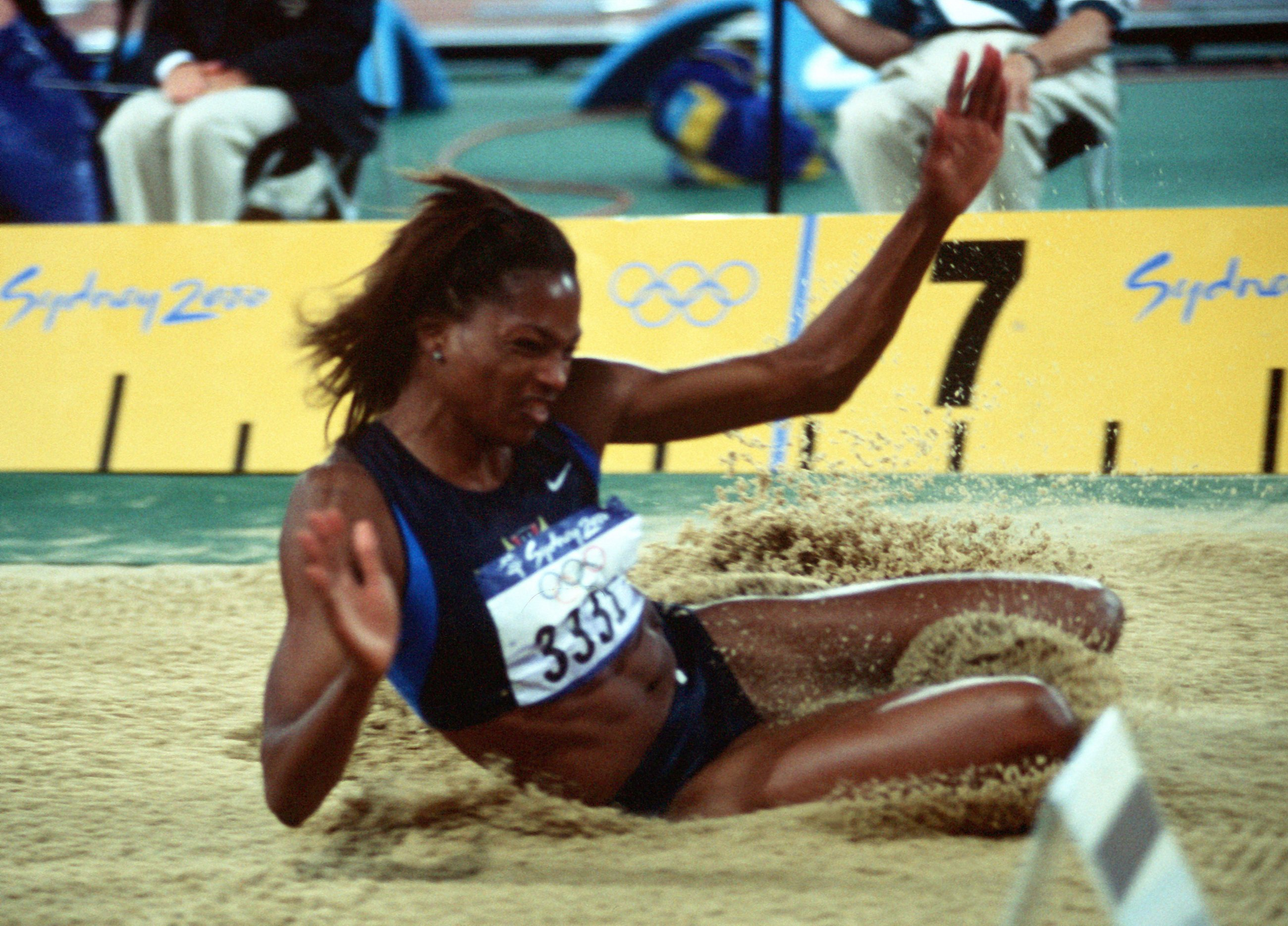
- Dawn Burrell in the 2000 Olympic long jump competition

Overview
- Sport: Athletics
- Gender: Men and women
- Years held: Men: 1896–2024; Women: 1948–2024

Olympic record
- Men: 8.90 m Bob Beamon (1968)
- Women: 7.40 m Jackie Joyner-Kersee (1988)

Reigning champion
- Men: Miltiadis Tentoglou (GRE)
- Women: Tara Davis-Woodhall (USA)

The long jump at the Summer Olympics, is grouped among the four track and field jumping events held at the multi-sport event. The men's long jump has been present on the Olympic athletics programme since the first Summer Olympics in 1896. The women's long jump was introduced over fifty years later in 1948, and was the second Olympic jumping event for women after the high jump, which was added in 1928.

The Olympic records for the event are 8.90 m (29 ft 2 1/4 in) for men, set by Bob Beamon in 1968, and 7.40 m (24 ft 3 1/4 in) for women, set by Jackie Joyner-Kersee in 1988. Beamon's mark is the longest-standing Olympic athletics record by a margin of twelve years, which was the only time a man has set a long jump world record at the competition. The women's world record has been broken on two occasions at the Olympics, with Mary Rand jumping 6.76 m (22 ft 2 in) in 1964 and Viorica Viscopoleanu clearing 6.82 m (22 ft 4 1/2 in) in 1968. In 1956, Elżbieta Krzesińska jumped 6.35 m (20 ft 10 in) to equal her own world record.

Ellery Clark and Olga Gyarmati were the first men's and women's Olympic long jump champions. Miltiadis Tentoglou and Malaika Mihambo are the reigning Olympic champions from 2020. Carl Lewis is the event's most successful athlete as he was Olympic champion four times consecutively from 1984 to 1996. Heike Drechsler is the only woman to win two Olympic long jump titles. Ralph Boston and Jackie Joyner-Kersee are the only other two athletes to win three Olympic long jump medals in their careers. The United States is the most successful nation in the event.

A standing long jump variant of the event was contested from 1900 to 1912 and standing jumps specialist Ray Ewry won all but one of the gold medals in its brief history.

== Medalists ==
=== Evolution ===
Games	Gold		Silver		Bronze	
1896 Athens	Ellery Clark; United States	6.35 m	Robert Garrett; United States	6.18 m	James Brendan Connolly; United States	6.11 m
1900 Paris	Alvin Kraenzlein; United States	7.185 m	Myer Prinstein; United States	7.175 m	Patrick Leahy; Great Britain	6.95 m
1904 St. Louis	Myer Prinstein; United States	7.34 m	Daniel Frank; United States	6.89 m	Robert Stangland; United States	6.88 m
1908 London	Frank Irons; United States	7.48 m	Daniel Kelly; United States	7.09 m	Calvin Bricker; Canada	7.08 m
1912 Stockholm	Albert Gutterson; United States	7.60 m	Calvin Bricker; Canada	7.21 m	Georg Åberg; Sweden	7.18 m
1920 Antwerp	William Petersson; Sweden	7.15 m	Carl Johnson; United States	7.095 m	Erik Abrahamsson; Sweden	7.08 m
1924 Paris	DeHart Hubbard; United States	7.445 m	Edward Gourdin; United States	7.275 m	Sverre Hansen; Norway	7.26 m
1928 Amsterdam	Ed Hamm; United States	7.73 m	Silvio Cator; Haiti	7.58 m	Al Bates; United States	7.40 m
1932 Los Angeles	Ed Gordon; United States	7.64 m	Lambert Redd; United States	7.60 m	Chūhei Nambu; Japan	7.45 m
1936 Berlin	Jesse Owens; United States	8.06 m	Luz Long; Germany	7.87 m	Naoto Tajima; Japan	7.74 m
1948 London	Willie Steele; United States	7.82 m	Bill Bruce; Australia	7.55 m	Herb Douglas; United States	7.54 m
1952 Helsinki	Jerome Biffle; United States	7.57 m	Meredith Gourdine; United States	7.53 m	Ödön Földessy; Hungary	7.30 m
1956 Melbourne	Gregory Bell; United States	7.83 m	John Bennett; United States	7.68 m	Jorma Valkama; Finland	7.48 m
1960 Rome	Ralph Boston; United States	8.12 m	Bo Roberson; United States	8.11 m	Igor Ter-Ovanesyan; Soviet Union	8.04 m
1964 Tokyo	Lynn Davies; Great Britain	8.07 m	Ralph Boston; United States	8.03 m	Igor Ter-Ovanesyan; Soviet Union	7.99 m
1968 Mexico City	Bob Beamon; United States	8.90 m	Klaus Beer; East Germany	8.19 m	Ralph Boston; United States	8.16 m
1972 Munich	Randy Williams; United States	8.24 m	Hans Baumgartner; West Germany	8.18 m	Arnie Robinson; United States	8.03 m
1976 Montreal	Arnie Robinson; United States	8.35 m	Randy Williams; United States	8.11 m	Frank Wartenberg; East Germany	8.02 m
1980 Moscow	Lutz Dombrowski; East Germany	8.54 m	Frank Paschek; East Germany	8.21 m	Valeriy Pidluzhnyy; Soviet Union	8.18 m
1984 Los Angeles	Carl Lewis; United States	8.54 m	Gary Honey; Australia	8.24 m	Giovanni Evangelisti; Italy	8.24 m
1988 Seoul	Carl Lewis; United States	8.72 m	Mike Powell; United States	8.49 m	Larry Myricks; United States	8.27 m
1992 Barcelona	Carl Lewis; United States	8.67 m	Mike Powell; United States	8.64 m	Joe Greene; United States	8.34 m
1996 Atlanta	Carl Lewis; United States	8.50 m	James Beckford; Jamaica	8.29 m	Joe Greene; United States	8.24 m
2000 Sydney	Iván Pedroso; Cuba	8.55 m	Jai Taurima; Australia	8.49 m	Roman Shchurenko; Ukraine	8.31 m
2004 Athens	Dwight Phillips; United States	8.59 m	John Moffitt; United States	8.47 m	Joan Lino Martínez; Spain	8.32 m
2008 Beijing	Irving Saladino; Panama	8.34 m	Godfrey Khotso Mokoena; South Africa	8.24 m	Ibrahim Camejo; Cuba	8.20 m
2012 London	Greg Rutherford; Great Britain	8.31 m	Mitchell Watt; Australia	8.16 m	Will Claye; United States	8.12 m
2016 Rio de Janeiro	Jeff Henderson; United States	8.38 m	Luvo Manyonga; South Africa	8.37 m	Greg Rutherford; Great Britain	8.29 m
2020 Tokyo	Miltiadis Tentoglou; Greece	8.41 m	Juan Miguel Echevarría; Cuba	8.41 m	Maykel Massó; Cuba	8.21 m
2024 Paris	Miltiadis Tentoglou; Greece	8.48 m	Wayne Pinnock; Jamaica	8.36 m	Mattia Furlani; Italy	8.34 m

==== Medal table ====
Rank	Nation	Gold	Silver	Bronze	Total
1	United States (USA)	22	15	10	47
2	Great Britain (GBR)	2	0	2	4
3	Greece (GRE)	2	0	0	2
4	East Germany (GDR)	1	2	1	4
5	Cuba (CUB)	1	1	2	4
6	Sweden (SWE)	1	0	2	3
7	Panama (PAN)	1	0	0	1
8	Australia (AUS)	0	4	0	4
9	Germany (GER)	0	2	0	2
9	Jamaica (JAM)	0	2	0	2
9	South Africa (RSA)	0	2	0	2
12	Canada (CAN)	0	1	1	2
13	Haiti (HAI)	0	1	0	1
14	Soviet Union (URS)	0	0	3	3
15	Italy (ITA)	0	0	2	2
15	Japan (JPN)	0	0	2	2
17	Finland (FIN)	0	0	1	1
17	Hungary (HUN)	0	0	1	1
17	Norway (NOR)	0	0	1	1
17	Spain (ESP)	0	0	1	1
17	Ukraine (UKR)	0	0	1	1
Totals (21 entries)		30	30	30	90

==== Multiple medalists ====
Rank	Athlete	Nation	Olympics	Gold	Silver	Bronze	Total
1	Carl Lewis	United States	1984–1996	4	0	0	4
2	Miltiadis Tentoglou	Greece	2020–2024	2	0	0	2
3	Ralph Boston	United States	1960–1968	1	1	1	3
4	Myer Prinstein	United States	1900–1904	1	1	0	2
4	Randy Williams	United States	1972–1976	1	1	0	2
6	Arnie Robinson	United States	1972–1976	1	0	1	2
6	Greg Rutherford	Great Britain	2012–2016	1	0	1	2
8	Mike Powell	United States	1988–1992	0	2	0	2
9	Calvin Bricker	Canada	1908–1912	0	1	1	2
10	Igor Ter-Ovanesyan	Soviet Union	1960–1964	0	0	2	2
10	Joe Greene	United States	1992–1996	0	0	2	2

=== Women ===
==== Evolution ====
Games	Gold		Silver		Bronze	
1948 London	Olga Gyarmati; Hungary	5.695 m	Noemí Simonetto; Argentina	5.60 m	Ann-Britt Leyman; Sweden	5.575 m
1952 Helsinki	Yvette Williams; New Zealand	6.24 m	Aleksandra Chudina; Soviet Union	6.14 m	Shirley Cawley; Great Britain	5.92 m
1956 Melbourne	Elżbieta Krzesińska; Poland	6.35 m	Willye White; United States	6.09 m	Nadezhda Khnykina-Dvalishvili; Soviet Union	6.07 m
1960 Rome	Vera Krepkina; Soviet Union	6.37 m	Elżbieta Krzesińska; Poland	6.27 m	Hildrun Claus; United Team of Germany	6.21 m
1964 Tokyo	Mary Rand; Great Britain	6.76 m	Irena Kirszenstein; Poland	6.60 m	Tatyana Shchelkanova; Soviet Union	6.42 m
1968 Mexico City	Viorica Viscopoleanu; Romania	6.82 m	Sheila Sherwood; Great Britain	6.68 m	Tatyana Talysheva; Soviet Union	6.66 m
1972 Munich	Heide Rosendahl; West Germany	6.78 m	Diana Yorgova; Bulgaria	6.77 m	Eva Šuranová; Czechoslovakia	6.67 m
1976 Montreal	Angela Voigt; East Germany	6.72 m	Kathy McMillan; United States	6.66 m	Lidiya Alfeyeva; Soviet Union	6.60 m
1980 Moscow	Tatyana Kolpakova; Soviet Union	7.06 m	Brigitte Wujak; East Germany	7.04 m	Tatyana Skachko; Soviet Union	7.01 m
1984 Los Angeles	Anișoara Cușmir-Stanciu; Romania	6.96 m	Valy Ionescu; Romania	6.81 m	Sue Hearnshaw; Great Britain	6.80 m
1988 Seoul	Jackie Joyner-Kersee; United States	7.40 m	Heike Drechsler; East Germany	7.22 m	Galina Chistyakova; Soviet Union	7.11 m
1992 Barcelona	Heike Drechsler; Germany	7.14 m	Inessa Kravets; Unified Team	7.12 m	Jackie Joyner-Kersee; United States	7.07 m
1996 Atlanta	Chioma Ajunwa; Nigeria	7.12 m	Fiona May; Italy	7.02 m	Jackie Joyner-Kersee; United States	7.00 m
2000 Sydney	Heike Drechsler; Germany	6.99 m	Fiona May; Italy	6.92 m	Tatyana Kotova; Russia	6.83 m
2004 Athens	Tatyana Lebedeva; Russia	7.07 m	Irina Simagina; Russia	7.05 m	Tatyana Kotova; Russia	7.05 m
2008 Beijing	Maurren Maggi; Brazil	7.04 m	Blessing Okagbare; Nigeria	6.91 m	Chelsea Hammond; Jamaica	6.79 m
2012 London	Brittney Reese; United States	7.12 m	Elena Sokolova; Russia	7.07 m	Janay DeLoach; United States	6.89 m
2016 Rio de Janeiro	Tianna Bartoletta; United States	7.17 m	Brittney Reese; United States	7.15 m	Ivana Španović; Serbia	7.08 m
2020 Tokyo	Malaika Mihambo; Germany	7.00 m	Brittney Reese; United States	6.97 m	Ese Brume; Nigeria	6.97 m
2024 Paris	Tara Davis-Woodhall; United States	7.10 m	Malaika Mihambo; Germany	6.98 m	Jasmine Moore; United States	6.96 m

==== Medal table ====
Rank	Nation	Gold	Silver	Bronze	Total
1	United States (USA)	4	4	4	12
2	Germany (GER)	4	1	0	5
3	Soviet Union (URS)	2	1	6	9
4	Romania (ROU)	2	1	0	3
5	Russia (RUS)	1	2	2	5
6	East Germany (GDR)	1	2	1	4
7	Poland (POL)	1	2	0	3
8	Great Britain (GBR)	1	1	2	4
9	Nigeria (NGR)	1	1	1	3
10	Brazil (BRA)	1	0	0	1
10	Hungary (HUN)	1	0	0	1
10	New Zealand (NZL)	1	0	0	1
13	Italy (ITA)	0	2	0	2
14	Argentina (ARG)	0	1	0	1
14	Bulgaria (BUL)	0	1	0	1
14	Ukraine (UKR)	0	1	0	1
17	Czechoslovakia (TCH)	0	0	1	1
17	Jamaica (JAM)	0	0	1	1
17	Serbia (SRB)	0	0	1	1
17	Sweden (SWE)	0	0	1	1
Totals (20 entries)		20	20	20	60

==== Multiple medalists ====
Rank	Athlete	Nation	Olympics	Gold	Silver	Bronze	Total
1	Heike Drechsler	Germany; East Germany	1988–2000	2	1	0	3
2	Brittney Reese	United States	2012–2020	1	2	0	3
3	Elżbieta Krzesińska	Poland	1956–1960	1	1	0	2
3	Malaika Mihambo	Germany	2020–2024	1	1	0	2
5	Jackie Joyner-Kersee	United States	1988–1996	1	0	2	3
6	Fiona May	Italy	1996–2000	0	2	0	2
7	Tatyana Kotova	Russia	2000–2004	0	0	2	2

== Standing long jump ==
Standing long jump at the Olympic Games
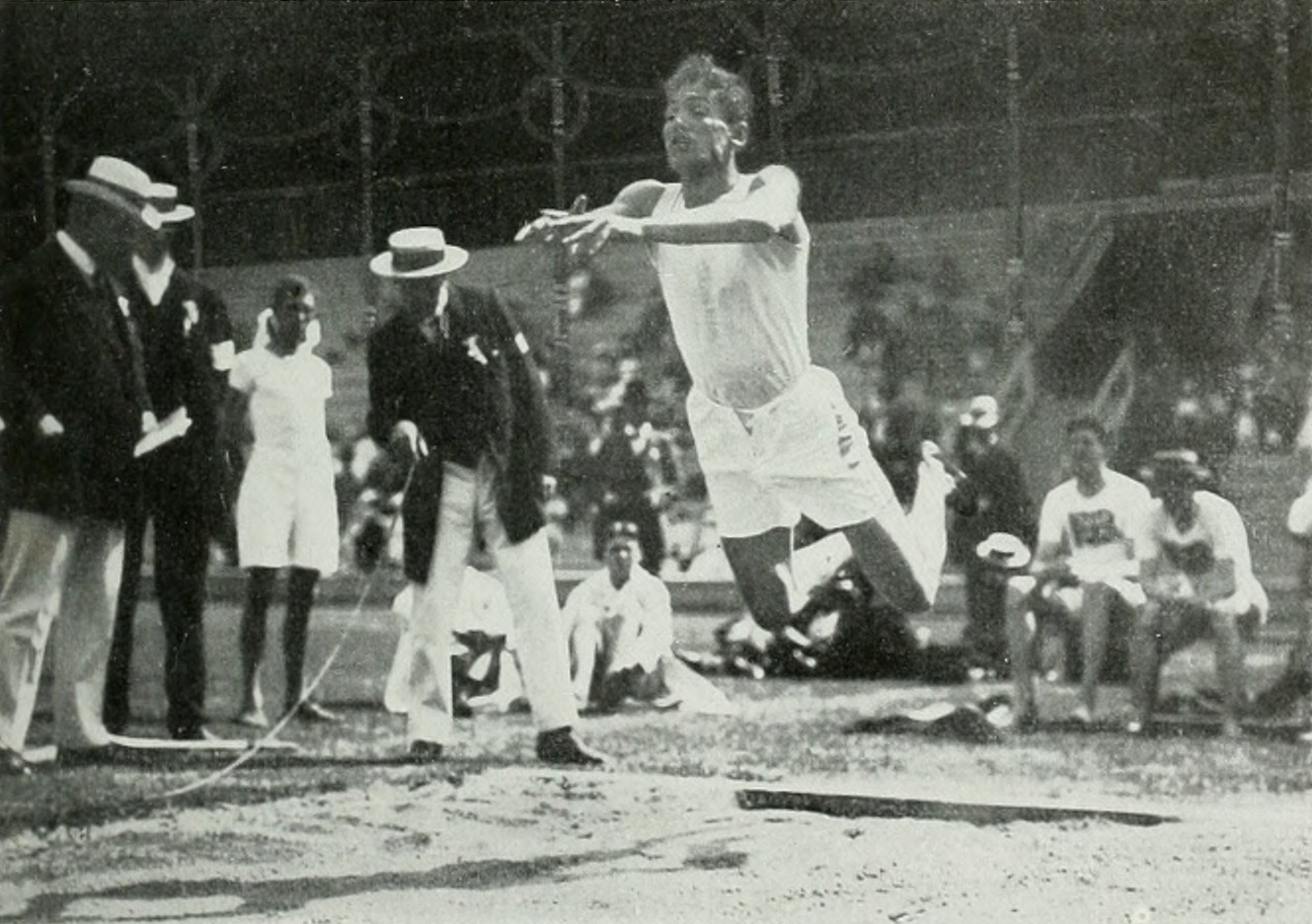
- Kostas Tsiklitiras in the 1912 standing long jump competition

Overview
- Sport: Athletics
- Gender: Men
- Years held: Men: 1900–1912

Olympic record
- Men: 3.47 m Ray Ewry (1904)

From 1900 to 1912 a variation of the event was contested at the Olympics where athletes had to long jump from a standing position. This was one of three standing jumps to have featured on the Olympic programme, alongside the standing high jump (present for the same period) and the standing triple jump (1900 and 1904 only).

The standing jump competitions were dominated by Ray Ewry, who won the Olympic standing long jump titles in 1900, 1904 and 1908. His clearance of 3.47 m (11 ft 4 1/2 in) at the 1904 Olympics remained as the Olympic record for the event until its discontinuation in 1912. Ewry took Olympic three gold medals in standing jumps in both 1900 and 1904, then won the standing high and long jumps at the 1908 Olympics, as well as the 1906 Intercalated Games. After Ewry's retirement, Kostas Tsiklitiras became the winner of the final Olympic standing long jump competition in 1912.

The standing long jump—and standing jump events in general—had been a relatively common type of athletics event at the end of the 19th century, but became increasingly rare at top level national and international competitions as the 20th century progressed. The Olympic event remains the only major international competition to have featured the event, except for the first three editions of the Women's World Games in the 1920s, as well as the 1919 and 1920 editions of the South American Championships in Athletics. The standing long jump retained some popularity as a championship event in Scandinavia in the second half of the century.

Games	Gold	Silver	Bronze
1900 Paris	Ray Ewry; United States	Irving Baxter; United States	Emile Torcheboeuf; France
1904 St. Louis	Ray Ewry; United States	Charles King; United States	John Biller; United States
1908 London	Ray Ewry; United States	Konstantinos Tsiklitiras; Greece	Martin Sheridan; United States
1912 Stockholm	Konstantinos Tsiklitiras; Greece	Platt Adams; United States	Benjamin Adams; United States

== Intercalated Games ==
The 1906 Intercalated Games were held in Athens and at the time were officially recognised as part of the Olympic Games series, with the intention being to hold a games in Greece in two-year intervals between the internationally held Olympics. However, this plan never came to fruition and the International Olympic Committee (IOC) later decided not to recognise these games as part of the official Olympic series. Some sports historians continue to treat the results of these games as part of the Olympic canon.

Continuing its presence since the first Olympics, a men's long jump event was contested at the 1906 Games. The two protagonists were Myer Prinstein (the 1904 champion) and Peter O'Connor (the world record holder). Prinstein won with his opening jump of 7.20 m (23 ft 7 1/4 in). O'Connor was runner-up in 7.02 m (23 ft 1/4 in) but protested the measuring of Prinstein's mark and the judgement of no-jump rulings against him. Hugo Friend was a comfortable third in 6.96 m (22 ft 10 in).

Games	Gold	Silver	Bronze
1906 Athens	Myer Prinstein (USA)	Peter O'Connor (GBR)	Hugo Friend (USA)

The standing long jump variant was also contested at the Intercalated Games. Ray Ewry, who entered as the undefeated Olympic champion in the event, won a further gold medal with his mark of 3.30 m (10 ft 9 3/4 in). It was an American podium sweep with Martin Sheridan and Lawson Robertson taking second and third place.

Games	Gold	Silver	Bronze
1906 Athens	Ray Ewry (USA)	Martin Sheridan (USA)	Lawson Robertson (USA)

== Non-canonical Olympic events ==
In addition to the main 1900 Olympic men's long jump, a handicap competition was held four days later. Pál Koppán of Hungary won with a mark of 7.895 m (1.60 m handicap) and John McLean of the United States came second with 7.72 m (85 cm handicap). Sources differ as to whether the third-place finisher William Percy Remington (who was fourth in the main Olympic event) or Thaddeus McClain (seventh in the Olympic long jump).

Two professionals-only contests were held in 1900. Mike Sweeney of the United States won with 5.995 m. Another American, Otto Bruno Schoenfeld, was second in 5.60 m, while Frenchman Jules Bouchoux came third in 5.55 m. A handicap professional contest was also held but the results have not been located.

The handicap event returned at the 1904 Summer Olympics and the three Olympic finalists who failed to win medals comprised the top three – all of them American. Fred Englehardt won with 6.82 m, Gilbert Van Cleve was runner-up with a mark of 6.53 m, and John Hagerman took third, recording 6.53 m. The corresponding handicaps are not known.

These events are no longer considered part of the official Olympic history of the long jump or the athletics programme in general. Consequently, medals from these competitions have not been assigned to nations on the all-time medal tables.
