= Tutkowski =

Pomeranian noble family

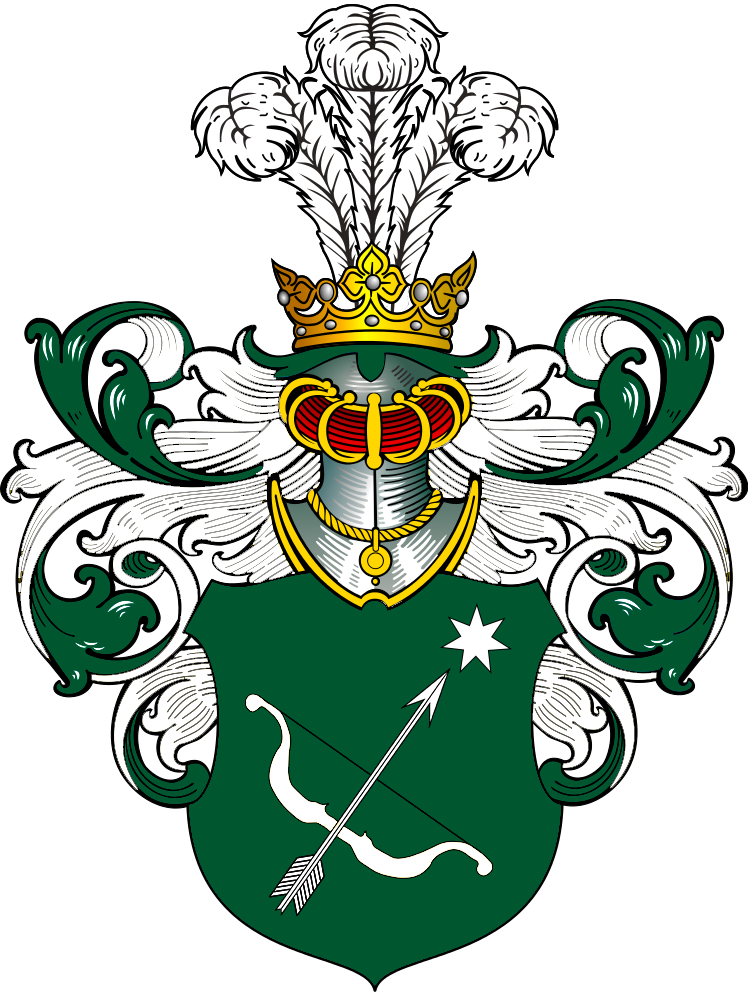
House of Tutkowski coat of arms

The House of Tutkowski is a Pomeranian noble family known mostly as landowners at the current site of the city of Gdynia.

== Family history ==
The Tutkowski's were originally most likely of Lithuanian descent. This theory is supported by parochial documents from Kościerzyna County, which indicate that the last name's original form was Tutkus. The original last name is still common in the Anykščiai area in Lithuania.

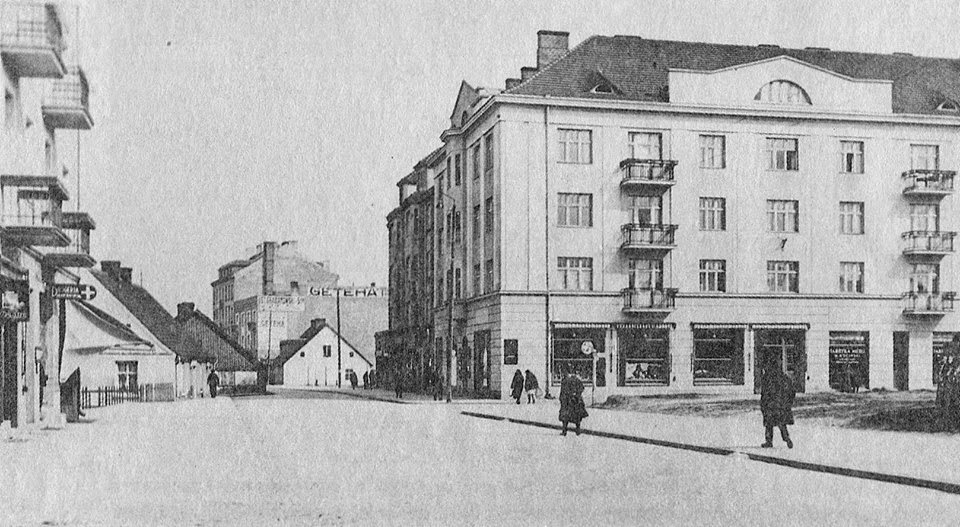
One of Tutkowski family's first major income properties, Starowiejska 11

The pivotal point in the family's history was the rapid transformation of the village of Gdynia into one of Poland's major cities in the interwar period thanks to the construction of a nearby port. The local branch of the Tutkowski family owned vast fields at the site of the current downtown area of the city, the port, and the villa district of Kamienna Góra. Because the family was one of the main families involved in the construction of the port of city of Gdynia, they are commonly referred to as one of the Four Big Families of Gdynia, along with the clans of Skwiercz, Grubba, and Dorsz. Along with their substantial growth in wealth, the Gdynia branch of the Tutkowski family, once local Pomeranian nobility (which historically wasn't strictly tied to any nation-state), became part of the Polish elite, marrying into established families of Wittstock, the owners of the village of Wittstock in the Free City of Danzig (nowadays the Wysoka district in Gdańsk); Brygman, owners of several estates in the Żuławy region (the Vistula delta); and Przesławski, one of the greatest families of Greater Poland.

After WWII, the Tutkowski family lost most of its estates in the Gdynia area due to expropriations executed by the communist government against landowners. The government motivated the expropriations with the provisions of eminent domain laws; their illegality stemmed from the lack of reasonable compensation offered. The Tutkowski's and other families in the city were only able to keep some of their built-up parcels. After the communist era, another blow was dealt to the Tutkowski family when their grand villa in the Kamienna Góra district was torn down before being returned to the family. It was only in the 2010s that the family started recovering its land and getting compensation for illegal expropriations of the 1960s.

== Coat of arms ==
According to 19th century heraldist Teodor Chrząński, the coat of arms of the House of Tutkowski is a variation on the Łuk coat of arms, which was fairly common in Poland. The theory is supported not only by the presence of the namesake bow on the shield, but also the crest's three ostrich feathers. In the seemingly chaotic Kashubian heraldry, coats of arms often functioned more as a connector to one's region, rather than to particular lineage, which explains the abundance of common heraldic elements such stars, moons, and arrows, connecting their bearing families with Kashubia. As a consequence of contacts with Polish nobility, it was quite common in Kashubia to either include Polish elements in one's coat of arms or completely replace it with a Polish one, such as the popularized Nałęcz and Brochwicz. The House of Tutkowski coat of arms is fairly typical for Kashubia, with its classic Kashubian star and a bow as per Chrząński most likely derived from Polish heraldry.
