= Robert Stangland =

American athlete (1881–1953)

Olympic medal record

Men's athletics

Representing the United States
Bronze medal – third place	1904 St. Louis	Long jump
Bronze medal – third place	1904 St. Louis	Triple jump

Robert Sedgwick Stangland (October 5, 1881 – December 15, 1953) was an American athlete who competed in the early twentieth century in the long jump and the triple jump.

Stangland won two bronze medals in athletics at the 1904 Summer Olympics at the age of 22. In the long jump, he won the bronze medal with a jump of 6.88 meters, finishing behind gold medalist Myer Prinstein and Daniel Frank who won the silver medal. In the triple jump at the 1904 Olympics, Stangland won another bronze medal with a distance of 13.365 meters with Myer Prinstein once again winning the gold medal and Fred Englehardt taking silver.

Stangland was born in Kendall, New York. He graduated in 1904 from Columbia University, where he completed in football, track and field, and crew. Stangland later worked as a consulting engineer. He died on December 15, 1953, in Nyack, New York.
