= Athletics at the 1904 Summer Olympics – Men's long jump =

Men's long jump at the Games of the III Olympiad
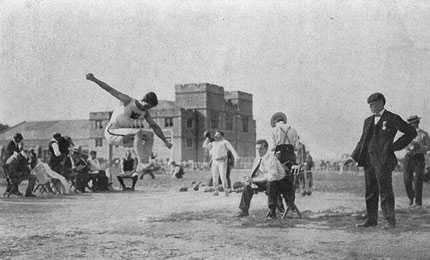
- Myer Prinstein during the jump on the way to finish in first place.
- Venue: Francis Field
- Dates: September 1, 1904
- Competitors: 9 from 3 nations
- Winning distance: 7.34 OR

Medalists
1st place, gold medalist(s)		Myer Prinstein; United States
2nd place, silver medalist(s)		Daniel Frank; United States
3rd place, bronze medalist(s)		Robert Stangland; United States

The men's long jump was a track and field athletics event held as part of the athletics at the 1904 Summer Olympics programme. It was the third time the event was held. Nine athletes from three nations participated. The competition was held on Thursday, September 1, 1904.

Myer Prinstein, who had taken second place in 1900 after leading in the first round of jumping but declining to compete in the second due to it being held on a Sunday, won the contest and set a new Olympic record for distance. It was the third straight victory for the United States and the second time (after 1896) the Americans had swept the medals in the event. Prinstein became the first man to win two medals in the event.

== Background ==
This was the third appearance of the event, which is one of 12 athletics events to have been held at every Summer Olympics. Myer Prinstein of the United States, who took silver in 1900, was the only jumper from Paris to return in 1904. Peter O'Connor would have been the favorite, but again did not appear. That left Prinstein as the favorite, though Daniel Frank had beaten him at the AAU meet.

Australia made its first appearance in the event. The United States appeared for the third time, the only nation to have long jumpers at each of the first three Games.

== Competition format ==
After having two rounds in 1900, the 1904 format returned to the single-round format used in 1896.

== Records ==
These were the standing world and Olympic records (in metres) prior to the 1904 Summer Olympics.

World record	Peter O'Connor (GBR)	7.61	Dublin, United Kingdom of Great Britain and Ireland	August 5, 1901
Olympic record	Alvin Kraenzlein (USA)	7.185	Paris, France	July 15, 1900

Myer Prinstein set a new Olympic record with 7.34 metres.

== Schedule ==
Date	Time	Round
Thursday, September 1, 1904		Final

== Results ==
Rank	Athlete	Nation	Distance	Notes
1st place, gold medalist(s)	Myer Prinstein	United States	7.34	OR
2nd place, silver medalist(s)	Daniel Frank	United States	6.89	
3rd place, bronze medalist(s)	Robert Stangland	United States	6.88	
4	Fred Englehardt	United States	6.63	
5	Gilbert Van Cleve	United States	Unknown	
6	John Hagerman	United States	Unknown	
7–9	Corrie Gardner	Australia	Unknown	
7–9	Béla Mező	Hungary	Unknown	
7–9	John Oxley	United States	Unknown	
—	Ervin Barker	United States	DNS	
—	Edward French	United States	DNS	
—	William Hunter	United States	DNS	
—	Leslie McPherson	Australia	DNS	
—	Louis Mertz	United States	DNS	
—	Percival Molson	Canada	DNS	
—	Frederick Schule	United States	DNS	
—	Garrett Serviss	United States	DNS	
—	George Smith	United States	DNS	
—	Ollie Snedigar	United States	DNS	
—	William Thompson	United States	DNS	

== Sources ==
- Wudarski, Pawel (1999). "Wyniki Igrzysk Olimpijskich" (in Polish).
