= John T. Oxley =

John T. Oxley may refer to:

- John Oxley (long jumper) (1881–1925), American track and field athlete
- John T. Oxley (polo) (1909–1996), American businessman and polo player
