= Szczuczyn =

Town in Podlaskie Voivodeship, Poland

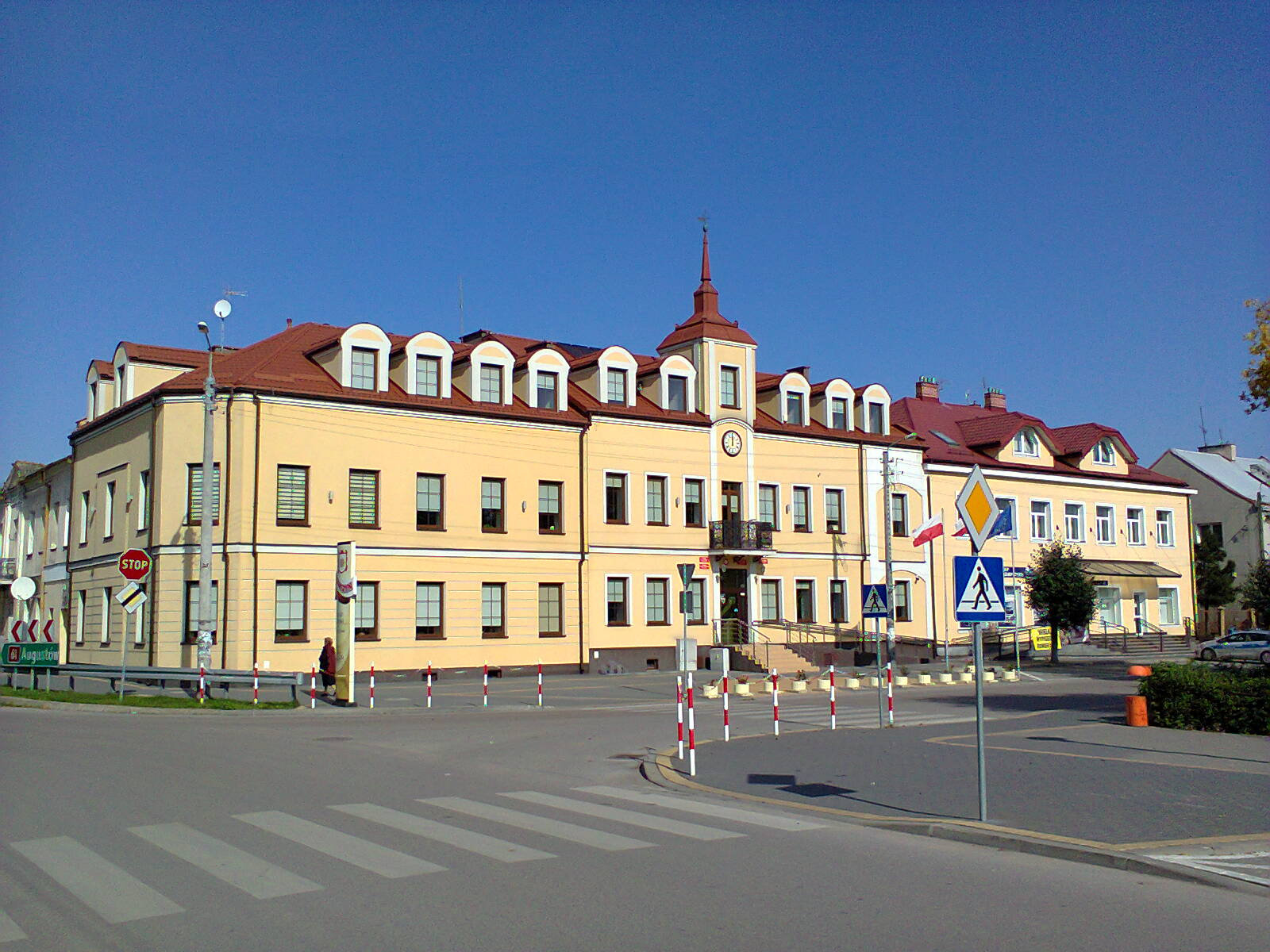
- Town hall

- Coat of arms

- Location within Poland
- Coordinates: 53°33′58″N 22°17′6″E
- Country: Poland
- Voivodeship: Podlaskie
- County: Grajewo
- Gmina: Szczuczyn
- Founded: 15th century
- Town rights: 1690s

Area
  - Total: 13.23 km^{2} (5.11 sq mi)

Population (2006)
  - Total: 3,564
  - Density: 269.4/km^{2} (697.7/sq mi)
- Time zone: UTC+1 (CET)
  - Summer (DST): UTC+2 (CEST)
- Postal code: 19-230
- Vehicle registration: BGR
- Website: http://www.um.szczuczyn.pl

Szczuczyn ([ˈʂt͡ʂut͡ʂɨn]; Yiddish: שצוצין, romanized: Shtutzin) is a town in Grajewo County, Podlaskie Voivodeship, in north-eastern Poland. As of 2004, it has a population of 3,602. The Wissa river flows through the town.

== History ==
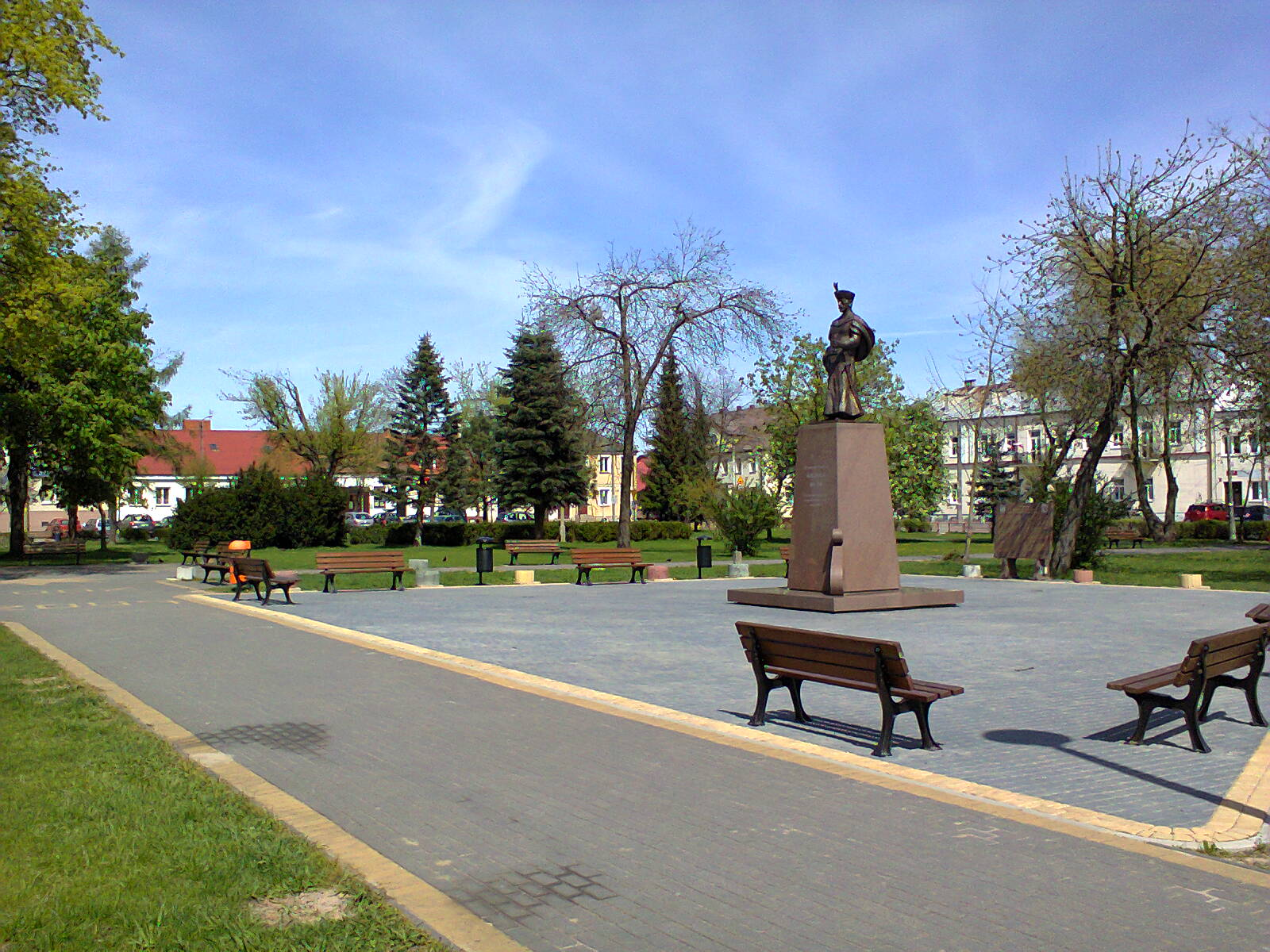
Town center with the monument of Stanisław Antoni Szczuka

The town is located in the north-eastern outskirts of Mazovia, which has been part of Poland since the establishment of the state in the Middle Ages. In 1437, the Szczuka noble family of the Grabie coat of arms purchased the land, on which they founded the village, which was initially named Szczuki-Litwa. Thanks to the efforts of Stanisław Antoni Szczuka, Szczuczyn was granted town rights around 1690 by Polish King John III Sobieski. Szczuka brought the Piarists to the town and a Baroque Piarist church and monastery complex was built, which remains the greatest landmark of the town. Szczuka also built a Piarist college, for which the Polish King established a scholarship fund. Szczuczyn was a private town, administratively located in the Masovian Voivodeship in the Greater Poland Province of the Polish Crown. Stanisław Antoni Szczuka, who died in Warsaw in 1710, was buried in the local Piarist church. In the 18th century the town passed to the powerful Potocki family. Factors that largely contributed to the development of the town were the presence of the school and the location on a trade route connecting Białystok and Königsberg. Among the teachers of the Piarist college were Jakub Falkowski, who then founded the oldest Polish school for deaf people in Warsaw, and Polish philosopher Bronisław Trentowski.

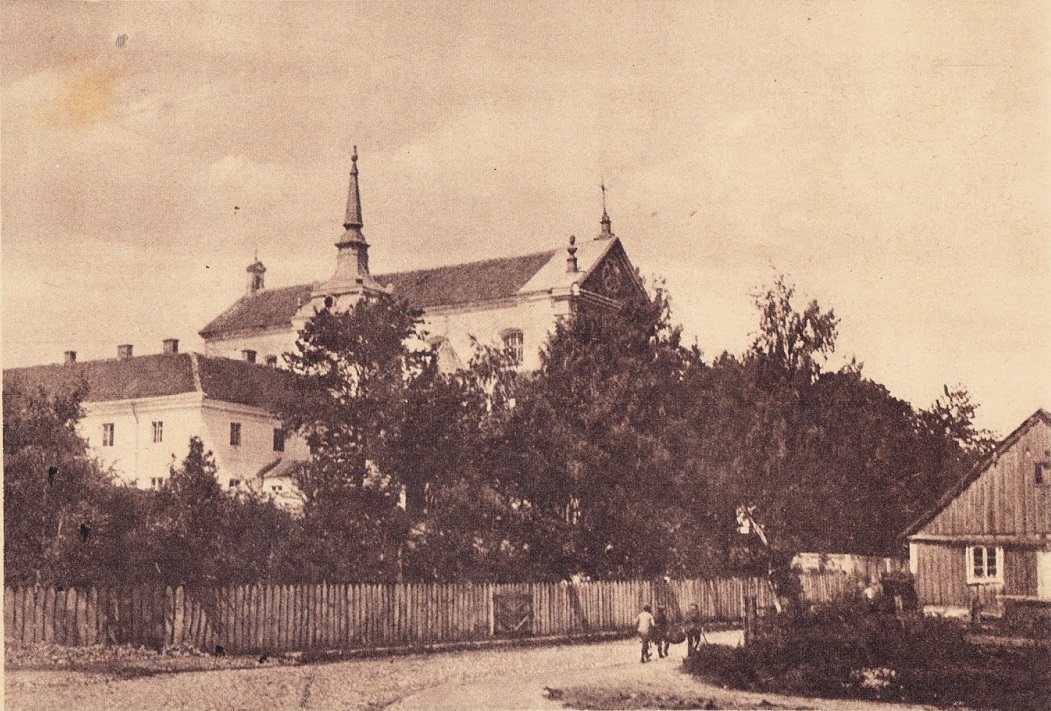
Piarist church in 1918

In the Third Partition of Poland, in 1795, it was annexed by Prussia, in 1807 it became part of the newly established, although short-lived, Polish Duchy of Warsaw, and in 1815 it passed to the Russian Partition of Poland. Within Russian Empire it was part of Szczuczyn yuezd of Łomża Governorate.

Afterwards it saw a significant influx of Jews from Russia as a result of Russian discriminatory regulations and persecution (see Pale of Settlement).

Szczuczyn was one of the sites of Russian executions of Polish insurgents during the January Uprising. On May 15, 1864, one of the last battles of the January Uprising was fought there. During World War I, the town was occupied by Germany, and after the war it became part of Poland when the country regained independence in 1918, remaining the administrative center of the same subdivision, but with Polish name, Powiat szczuczyński, or Szczuczyn County (which had become Grajewo County after its capital was moved to Grajewo).

=== World War II ===
Some 56% of the town's 4,502 inhabitants were Jews prior to World War II. During the invasion of Poland, which started World War II, it was captured and briefly occupied by German forces. On September 12–13, 1939, Einsatzgruppe V entered the town to commit various crimes against the population. Germans sent 350 men, mostly Jewish, to forced labor, of whom only 30 returned after five months. The town was then turned over to the Soviets, who arrested the wealthy residents of the town, including many Jews. Some twenty Jewish families were expelled to Siberia on 21 June 1941 and approximately 2,000 Jews remained in the town. In 1941 the local Polish underground resistance movement was weakened when the Soviets arrested its commander. In June 1941, some 300 Jews were killed in a massacre carried out by the Polish inhabitants of Szczuczyn after the town was bypassed by the invading German soldiers in the beginning of Operation Barbarossa. The June massacre was stopped by German soldiers. A subsequent massacre by Poles in July killed some 100 Jews, and following the German Gestapo takeover in August 1941 some 600 Jews were killed by the Germans, the remaining Jews placed in a ghetto, and subsequently sent to Treblinka extermination camp.

=== Post-war period ===
In the following years, the Polish anti-communist resistance was active in the town and area. In 1945, the resistance carried out four raids on the local communist police station, and, on 24 November 1945, captured the town, seizing control over the police station and local government offices. Two local youth resistance organizations were founded in Szczuczyn, i.e. Tajny Związek Młodzieży Polskiej (Secret Association of Polish Youth) and Zgrupowanie Młodych Partyzantów (Young Partisans' Group).

=== Jewish cemetery ===
There is an old Jewish cemetery about 3.4 hectares in extent established somtime before 1845. There is possibly one remaining gravestone. There is an ongoing project to restore the cemetery which is currently owned by FODŻ (Foundation for the Preservation of Jewish Heritage in Poland).

Only remaining gravestone at Jewish cemetery

== Transport ==
The S61 expressway bypasses Szczuczyn to the west. Exit 11 of the expressway provides access to the town.

The nearest railway station is in the town of Grajewo to the east.

== Sports ==
The local football club is Wissa Szczuczyn. It competes in the lower leagues.

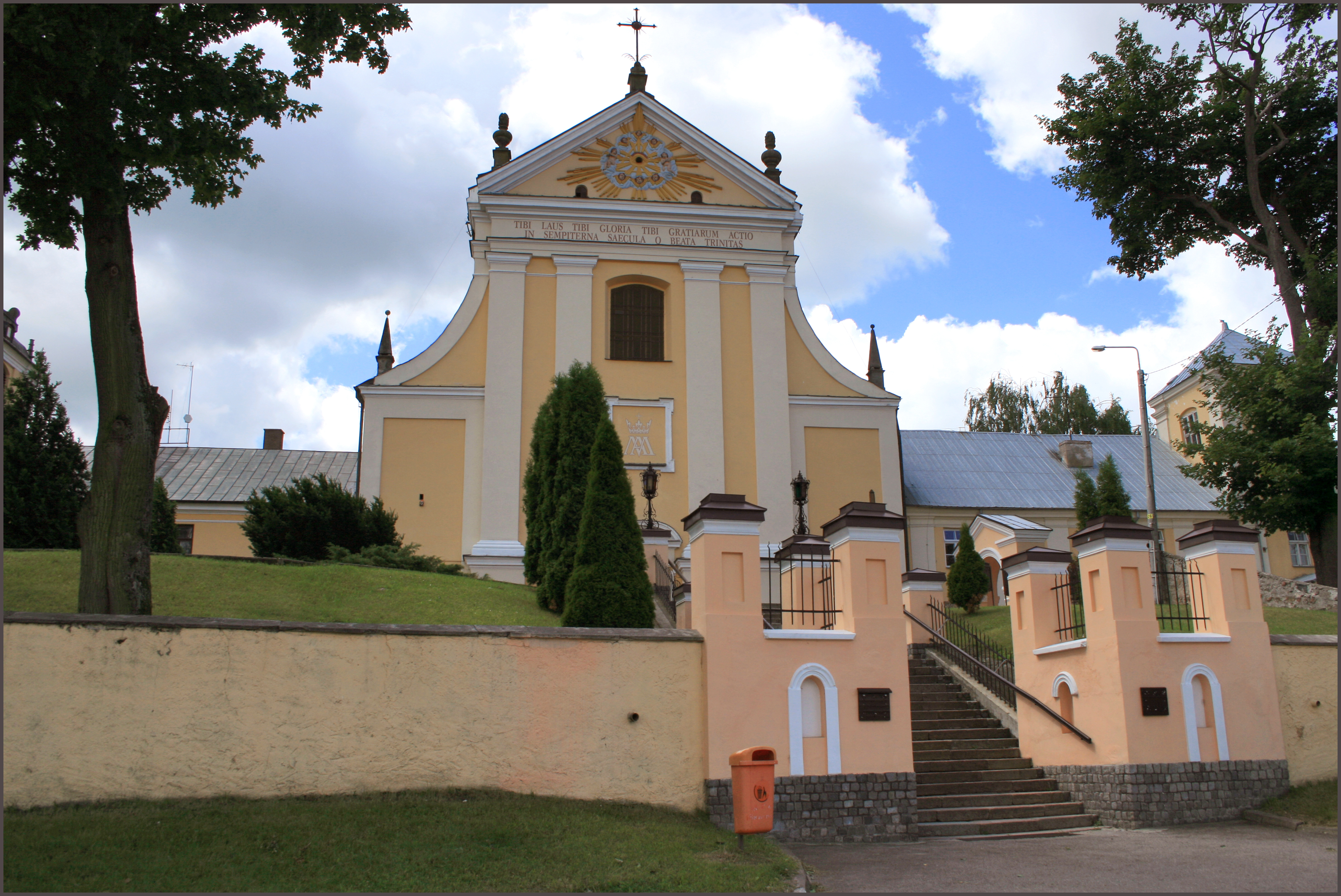
Baroque Piarist abbey

== Notable residents ==
- Fania Bergstein (1908–1950), Hebrew-language poet
- Jacek Laszczkowski (born 1966), Polish opera singer
- Maciej Makuszewski (born 1989), Polish footballer
- Myer Prinstein (1878–1925), Jewish American track and field athlete, three-time Olympic gold medal winner
- Stanisław Antoni Szczuka is buried there
- Bohdan Winiarski (1884–1969), Polish jurist, professor and former President of the International Court of Justice
