= Marcin Kątski =

Polish nobleman, politician, diplomat, scholar and military commander

Count Marcin Kątski
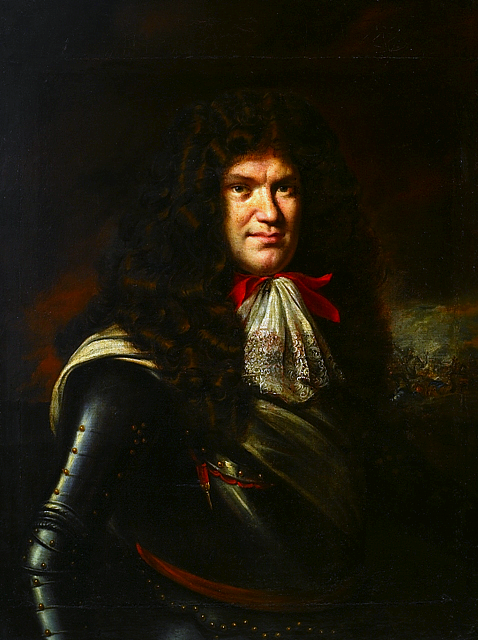
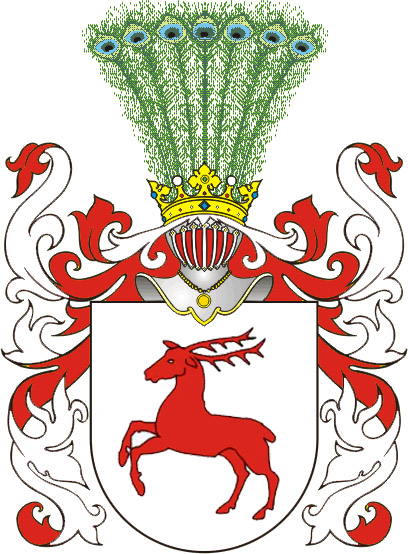
- Coat of arms: Brochwicz
- Full name: Marcin Kazimierz Kątski, Count Brochwicz
- Born: 1636; Kąty, Poland
- Died: 1710 (aged 73–74); Kamieniec Podolski, Poland
- Noble family: House of Kątski
- Spouse: Urszula Denhof
- Father: Wojciech Kątski, Count Brochwicz
- Mother: Anna ze Stogniewów, Countess Lubicz

Count Marcin Kazimierz Kątski of Brochwicz (1636 – 1710) was a Polish nobleman, politician, diplomat, scholar, military commander, General of Artillery of the Crown (1667–1710), the Voivode of Kiev (1684–1702) and Castellan of Kraków (1706–1710).

Kątski took part in all campaigns led by King John III Sobieski. Among others, he participated at the Battle of Chocim, Żórawne, Battle of Vienna and Parkany. He is often considered one of the greatest commanders of artillery in his time.

== Biography ==
=== Early life and studies ===
King John II Casimir funded a scholarship for young Kątski, so that in the years 1653–1657 he would become familiar with the latest trends in the art of war by serving in the French army and commanding together with Marshal Prince Louis de Bourbon in the Netherlands. In the years 1663 to 1664 as a lieutenant colonel of infantry, he took part in a military expedition of John II Casimir to the Dnieper river in Ruthenia.

=== Military career and politics ===
Kątski became the General of Artillery of the Crown in 1667. He Participated in all of the campaigns of chief captain, Hetman, and later King John Sobieski, including the siege of Vienna in 1683, when Kątski was only an artillery commander. However all of the armies of the Allies commanded by him managed to get through with 28 guns through the hills of the Viennese Woods.

During the reign of Augustus II the Strong he defeated the Turks near Kamieniec Podolski and regained the fortress.

During his military career, Kątski received merit for the development of Polish artillery and fortifications. His effort was visible at the confluence of the Dniester and Zbrucz rivers where a neglected defensive castle developed into the famous fortress and stronghold called Okopy Św. Trójcy (lit. Trenches of Holy Trinity).

In 1669 Kątski killed, in a duel, the Governor of Krosno Jan Karol Fredro. In 1674 he was the elector of King John III Sobieski. After the death of John III, Kątski was even considered as a potential heir to the throne. Following the election of Augustus II the Strong he was the steward and the governor of Podolia, the governor of Przemyśl, castellan of Lwów, Kiev and provincial governor and castellan of Kraków.

== Marriage and issue ==
Marcin Kazimierz Kątski married Urszula Denhof, countess Denhof, daughter of treasurer Teodor Denhof, count Denhof and Katharina Francis von Bessen and had three children:

- Teresa Kątska (died 1746), married marshal and voivode of Pomorze and Mazowsze, starost of Lwów Stefan Potocki h. Piława
- Jan Stanisław Kątski (died 1727), general and miecznik of the Crown, married Wiktoria Szczuka h. Grabie, daughter of Sejm Marshal Stanisław Antoni Szczuka h. Grabie
- Marianna Kątska (1697–1752), married starost of Trembowla and Czehryń Michał Franciszek Potocki h. Piława

== Bibliography ==
- Marcin Kątski, Diariusz wyprawy wiedeńskiej króla Jana III w roku 1683, 2003
- Polski Słownik Biograficzny, t. 12, s. 316
- Piotr Salamon, Marcin Kazimierz Kątski 1635–1710 zarys biograficzny, Kraków 2013
- Jan Wimmer: Generał Marcin Kątski, 1954
