= Nowe Miasto nad Pilicą =

Town in Masovian Voivodeship, Poland

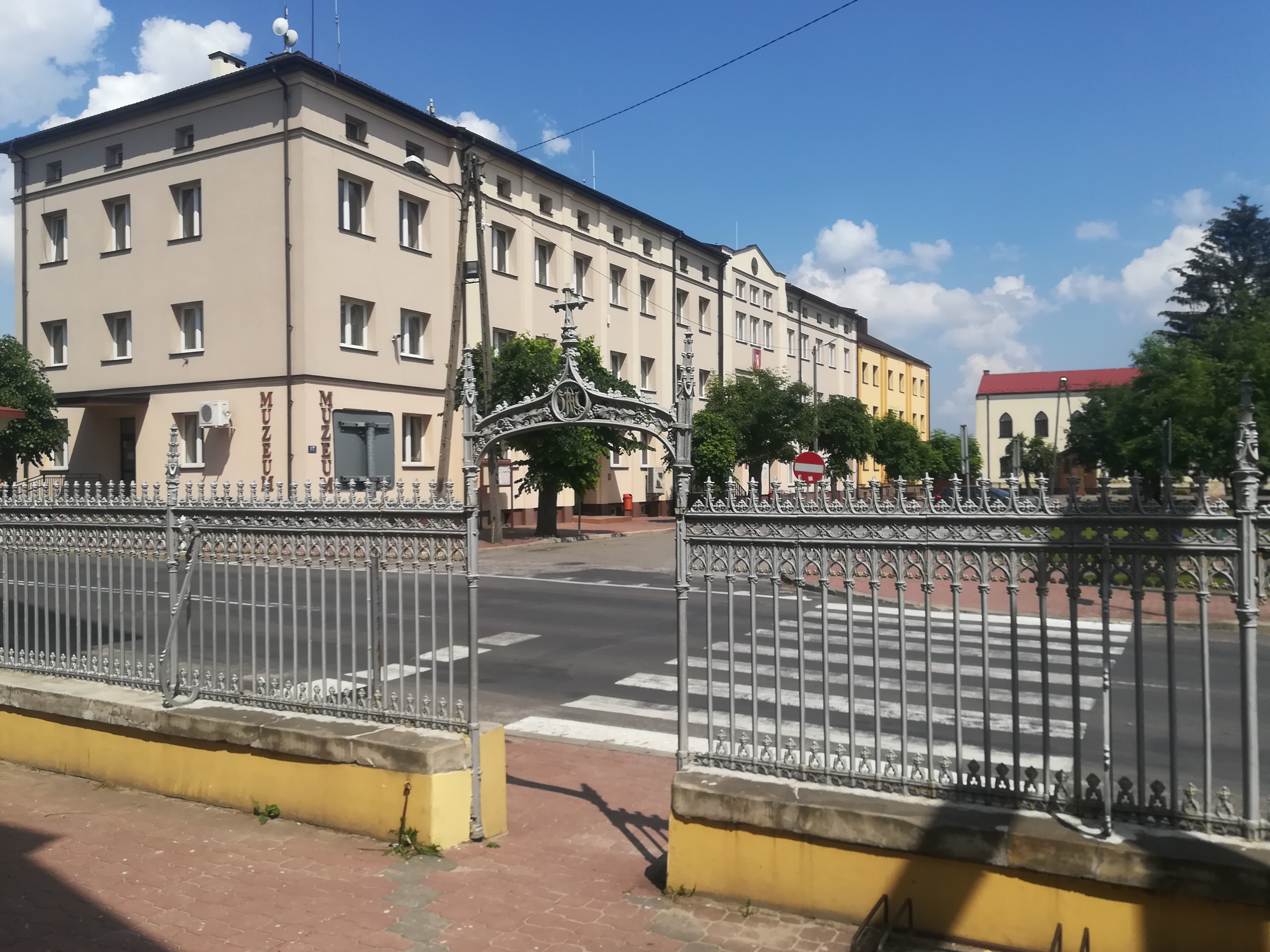
- Town center

- Coat of arms

- Location within Poland
- Coordinates: 51°37′10″N 20°34′34″E
- Country: Poland
- Voivodeship: Masovian
- County: Grójec
- Gmina: Nowe Miasto nad Pilicą
- Established: 14th century
- Town rights: 1400

Government
  - Mayor: Barbara Gąsiorowska (PSL)

Area
  - Total: 11.25 km^{2} (4.34 sq mi)

Population (2012)
  - Total: 4,022
  - Density: 357.5/km^{2} (925.9/sq mi)
- Time zone: UTC+1 (CET)
  - Summer (DST): UTC+2 (CEST)
- Postal code: 26-420
- Area code: +48 48
- Car plates: WGR
- Website: http://nowemiasto.pl

Nowe Miasto nad Pilicą (Polish: [ˈnɔvɛ ˈmjastɔ nat piˈlit͡sɔ̃]; translating to 'New Town on the Pilica') is a town in Grójec County, Masovian Voivodeship, in central Poland, with 4,022 inhabitants (2012).

== History ==
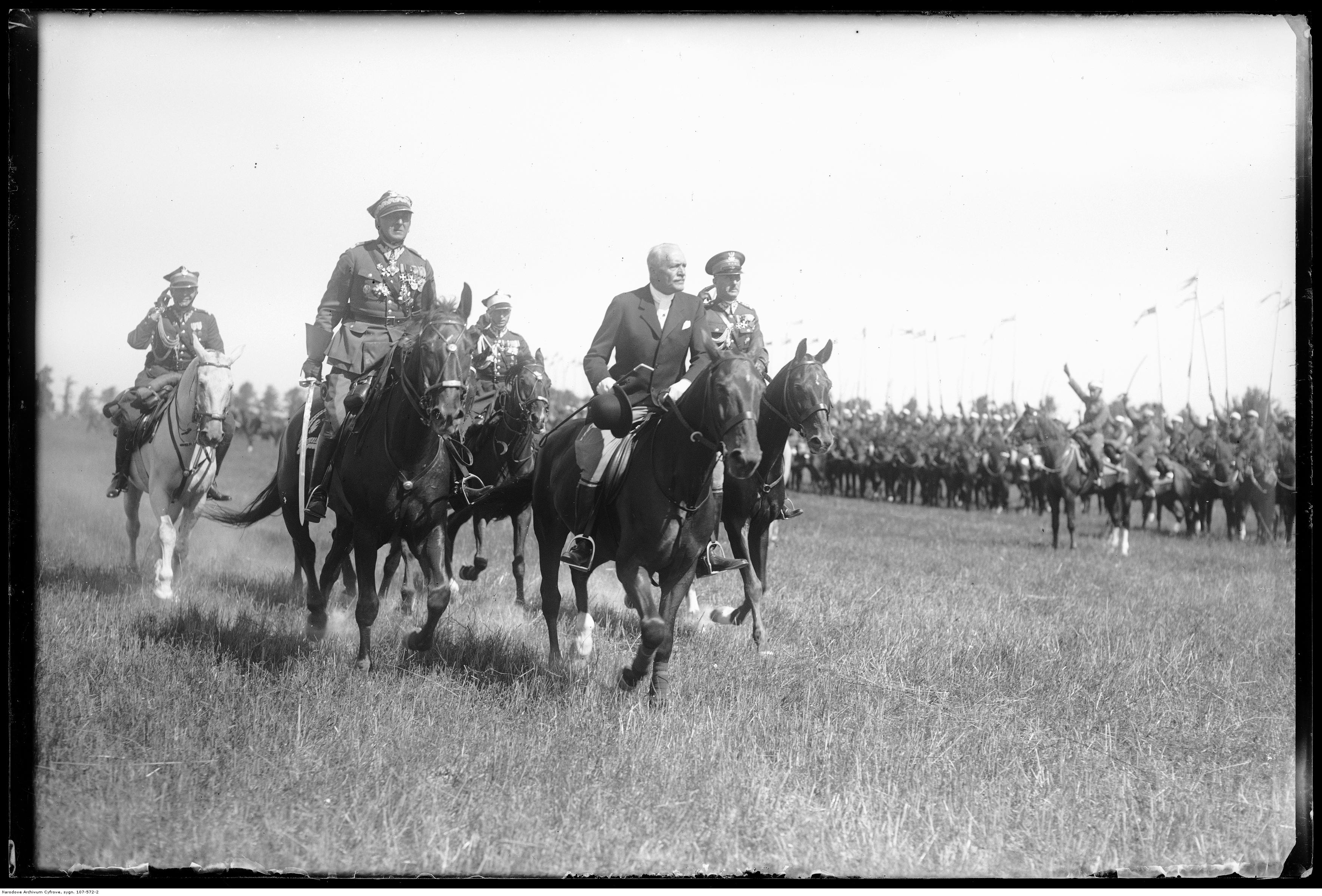
Armed Forces Day in Nowe Miasto nad Pilicą in 1933, attended by Polish President Ignacy Mościcki

It was granted town rights in 1400. The town was founded by a noble family of Rawicz coat of arms, which then took the name Nowomiejski after the town. It was a private town of various noble families, including the Nowomiejski, Zebrzydowski, Lipski, Sapieha, Granowski, Świdziński and Małachowski families, administratively located in the Biała County in the Rawa Voivodeship in the Greater Poland Province of the Kingdom of Poland. Kazimierz Granowski founded a Baroque Capuchin church and monastery in the town, whereas the Małachowski family founded the park In the early modern period, a trade route connecting Warsaw and Kraków ran through the town. It was one of the busiest routes in Poland. Four annual fairs were established in 1744, and five more were established in 1789. In 1874, dr Bieliński established a hydrotherapy facility outside the town, which attracted many patients in the summer.

Following the German-Soviet invasion of Poland, which started World War II in September 1939, the town was occupied by Nazi Germany until 1945. Four Poles, who were either born or lived and worked in the town, were murdered by the Russians in the Katyn massacre in 1940.

== Military ==
Just to the west of town is a former military airfield ICAO code EPNM. According to ADS-B tracking data, beginning on March 6, 2022 the airport received multiple visits by four LM-100J aircraft (N67AU, N96MG, N71KM, N139RB) belonging to the American company Pallas Aviation. By July 31, 2024 these flights numbered at least 257, almost all originating at Ramstein Air Base in Germany.

== Sights ==
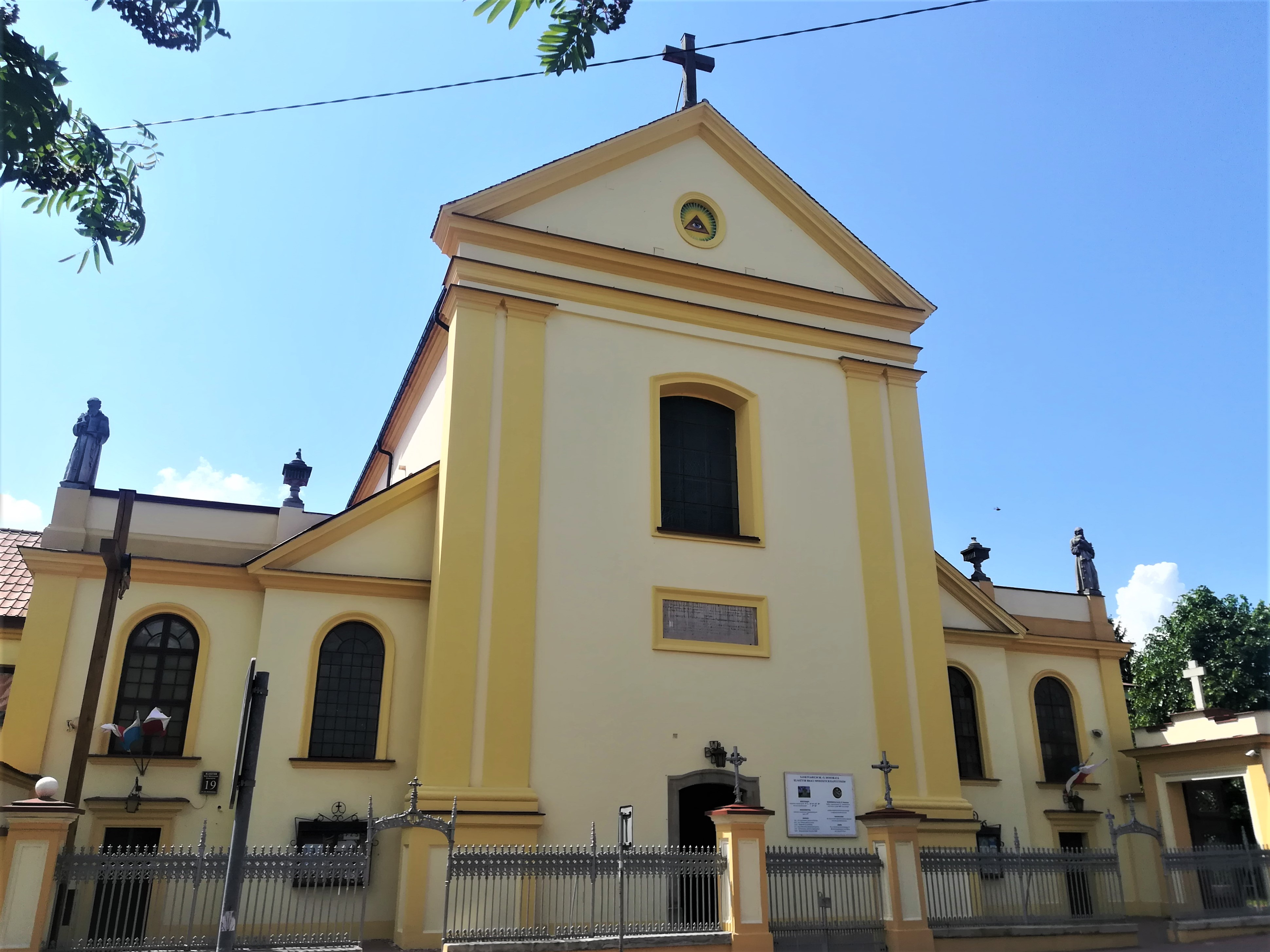
Baroque Capuchin monastery

Historic landmarks are the Baroque Capuchin monastery with the Saint Casimir church and Baroque Nowe Miasto nad Pilicą Palace.

== Transport ==
Nowe Miasto nad Pilicą lies at the intersection of voivodeship roads 728 and 707.

The nearest railway station is in Drzewica.
