= Stanisław Antoni Szczuka =

Polish noble (szlachcic), politician and political writer

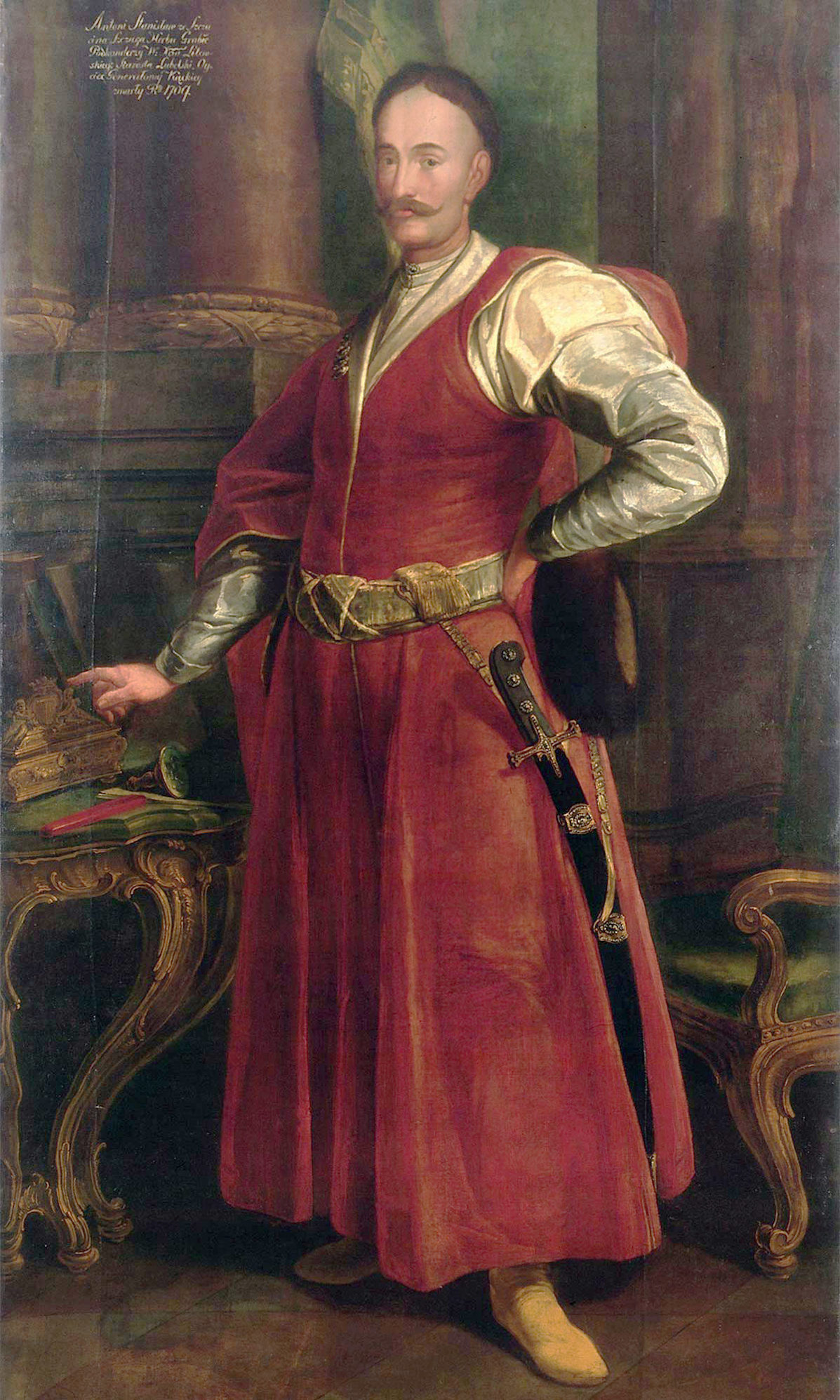
- Imaginary portrait of Stanisław Antoni Szczuka, about 1735-40, unknown painter, Wilanów Palace collection

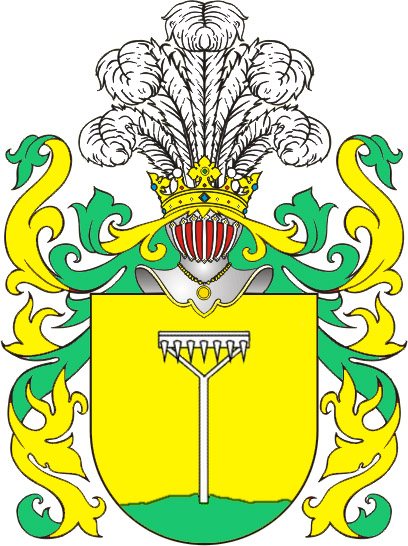
- Coat of arms: Grabie
- Born: 1654; Lubonicze (probably)
- Died: 19 May 1710 (aged 55–56); Warsaw, Poland
- Noble family: Szczuka
- Spouse: Konstancja Maria Anna Potocka h. Piława
- Issue: August Michal Szczuka; Marcin Leopold Stefan Szczuka; Jan Konsty Szczuka; Wiktoria Szczuka; Maria Anna Szczuka
- Father: Stanisław Szczuka h. Grabie
- Mother: Zofia Szpilewska Neronowiczów

Stanisław Antoni Szczuka h. Grabie [ˈʂt͡ʂuka] (1654 – 19 May 1710) was a Polish noble (szlachcic), talented politician and political writer.

== Biography ==
Stanisław Antoni was son of a serviceman Stanisław Szczuka h. Grabie and Zofia Szpilewska de domo Neronowiczów. His father was taken hostage by Russians during the Russo-Polish War. Stanisław Antoni had two siblings: brother Gracjan Michał and sister Anna.

He married Konstancja Maria Anna Potocka h. Piława on 6 February 1695, the daughter of starost of Janów Bogusław Potocki h. Piława.

He was a Recorder of the Crown (referendarz koronny) in 1688, deputy of Polish–Lithuanian Commonwealth in Ducal Prussia in 1690, Deputy Chancellor of Lithuania from 1699.

Szczuka was born to a middle-class szlachta family and educated in Wilno and Kraków. Because of his own ability and hard work he achieved high offices in the Republic. He began his political career in 1675 as secretary of King Jan III Sobieski. In 1696 he became an adviser to August II.

In 1706 he changed sides and became a supporter of Stanisław Leszczyński.

He was a notable political writer and Sejm orator. He also proposed the opening of public schools free of charge.

As Sejm Marshal he led the extraordinary Sejm from 17 November 1688 to 1 April 1689, and the pacification Sejm between 16 and 30 June 1699, in Warsaw.

He died on 19 May 1710 in Warsaw and was buried in Szczuczyn.

To sum up, Antoni Stanisław Szczuka (1654–1710) was a notable figure in Polish history, known for his integrity and dedication to the king. He served as Crown Referendary and later became Grand Lithuanian Chancellor under August II. His granddaughter, Marianna Potocka, possibly commissioned a portrait of him in Polish attire, although the painting lacks resemblance to him. Despite this, it gained popularity and was engraved multiple times in the 19th century.

== Works ==
- Respons posła bez interesu na informację paszkwilową pseudo ministrów status (1688)
- Responsum illustrissimis et excellentissimis dominis comiti Weling et secretario status Hermelino, legatis Sueciae, gratulantibus pacem Saxonicam serenissimo Stanislao regi Poloniae, nomine eiusdem (1706)
- Contestatio gratiarum sacrae regiae majestati Sueciae, a senatorio et equestri ordine Poloniae, per... exhibita, in Saxonia in pago Alt-Ransteda, brak miejsca wydania (1706)
- Eciipsis Poloniae Orbi Publice Demonstrata (1709)
- Powitanie od Izby poselskiej króla Jegomości... na sejmie roku 1699

== Marriage and issue ==
Stanisław Antoni married Konstancja Maria Anna Potocka h. Piława on 6 February 1695 and had five children:

- August Michal Szczuka
- Marcin Leopold Stefan Szczuka (1698–1728), starost of Wąwolnica, owner of and Biłgoraj and Wieksznie
- Jan Konsty Szczuka (died 1726), owner of Biłgoraj, married Princess Salomeja Sapieha h. Lis
- Wiktoria Szczuka, married general and miecznik of the Crown Jan Stanisław Kątski h. Brochwicz, the son of voivode of Kijów (Kyiv, also Kiev) Marcin Kazimierz Kątski h. Brochwicz
- Maria Anna Szczuka

== Bibliography ==
- Polski Słownik Biograficzny Vol. 47 p. 469
- Bibliografia Literatury Polskiej – Nowy Korbut, t. 3 Piśmiennictwo Staropolskie, Państwowy Instytut Wydawniczy, Warszawa 1965, s. 309-310
- Michałowska, Anna (1993). "Stanisław Antoni Szczuka - początki kariery patrona". Kwartalnik Historyczny. 102 (3–4).
