= John Fuhrer =

American triple jumper and football coach

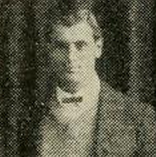
- Fuhrer pictured in the 1906 Doane football team photo

Biographical details
- Born: April 11, 1880; La Harpe, Illinois, U.S.
- Died: July 24, 1972 (aged 92); Lincoln, Nebraska, U.S.
- Education: Doane College (1906)

Playing career

Football
- 1901–1903: Doane

Coaching career (HC unless noted)

Football
- 1904–1907: Doane
- 1909–1914: Pittsburg Normal
- 1918: Pittsburg Normal

Basketball
- 1909–1914: Pittsburg Normal

Head coaching record
- Overall: 39–33–2 (football); 21–20 (basketball)

John William Fuhrer (April 11, 1880 – July 24, 1972) was an American college football and college basketball coach. He served as the head football coach at Doane College from 1904 to 1907 and Kansas State Teachers College of Pittsburg—referred to commonly at the time as Pittsburg Normal and now known as Pittsburg State University–from 1909 to 1914 and again in 1918, compiling a career college football coaching record of 39–33–2. Fuhrer was also the head basketball coach at Pittsburg Normal from 1909 to 1914, tallying a mark of 21–20. He also competed at the 1904 Summer Olympics.

== Athletic career ==
Fuhrer competed in the men's triple jump at the 1904 Summer Olympics, where he placed fourth.

== Coaching career ==
=== Doane ===
Fuhrer was the tenth head football coach at Doane College in Crete, Nebraska and he held that position for four seasons, from 1904 until 1907. His coaching record at Doane was 13–11.

In 1971, a gymnasium at Doane College was named after Fuhrer, with him present at the dedication.

=== Pittsburg State ===
Fuhrer was the second head football coach at Kansas State Teachers College of Pittsburg—referred to commonly at the time as Pittsburg Normal and now known as Pittsburg State University–in Pittsburg, Kansas. He coached from 1909 through 1914, and then returned for the 1918 season for a total of seven seasons. His teams posted a record of 26–22–2.

On November 27, 1913 in a game against the Southwestern Moundbuilders coached by Fred Clapp, Fuhrer officially launched a formal protest against the appearance of an African American player.

=== Lincoln Y.M.C.A. ===
Fuhrer moved to Lincoln, Nebraska in 1919 to serve as physical director of the Lincoln Y.M.C.A.

== Death ==
Fuhrer died on July 24, 1972, aged 92.

== Head coaching record ==
=== Football ===
Year	Team	Overall	Conference	Standing	Bowl/playoffs
Doane Tigers (Independent) (1904–1907)
1904	Doane	5–2			
1905	Doane	5–1			
1906	Doane	2–3			
1907	Doane	1–5			
Doane:		13–11			
Pittsburg Normal Gorillas (Kansas Collegiate Athletic Conference) (1909–1914)
1909	Pittsburg Normal	2–2–1			
1910	Pittsburg Normal	6–3			
1911	Pittsburg Normal	6–3			
1912	Pittsburg Normal	4–4			
1913	Pittsburg Normal	4–2–1	1–1–1	T–7th	
1914	Pittsburg Normal	1–7			
Pittsburg Normal Gorillas (Kansas Collegiate Athletic Conference) (1918)
1918	Pittsburg Normal	3–1			
Pittsburg Normal:		26–22–2			
Total:		39–33–2			
