= Nowe Miasto nad Pilicą Palace =

Historic building in Poland

Coordinates: 51°38′17.08″N 20°32′42.31″E

Granowski Palace
- Pałac Granowskich
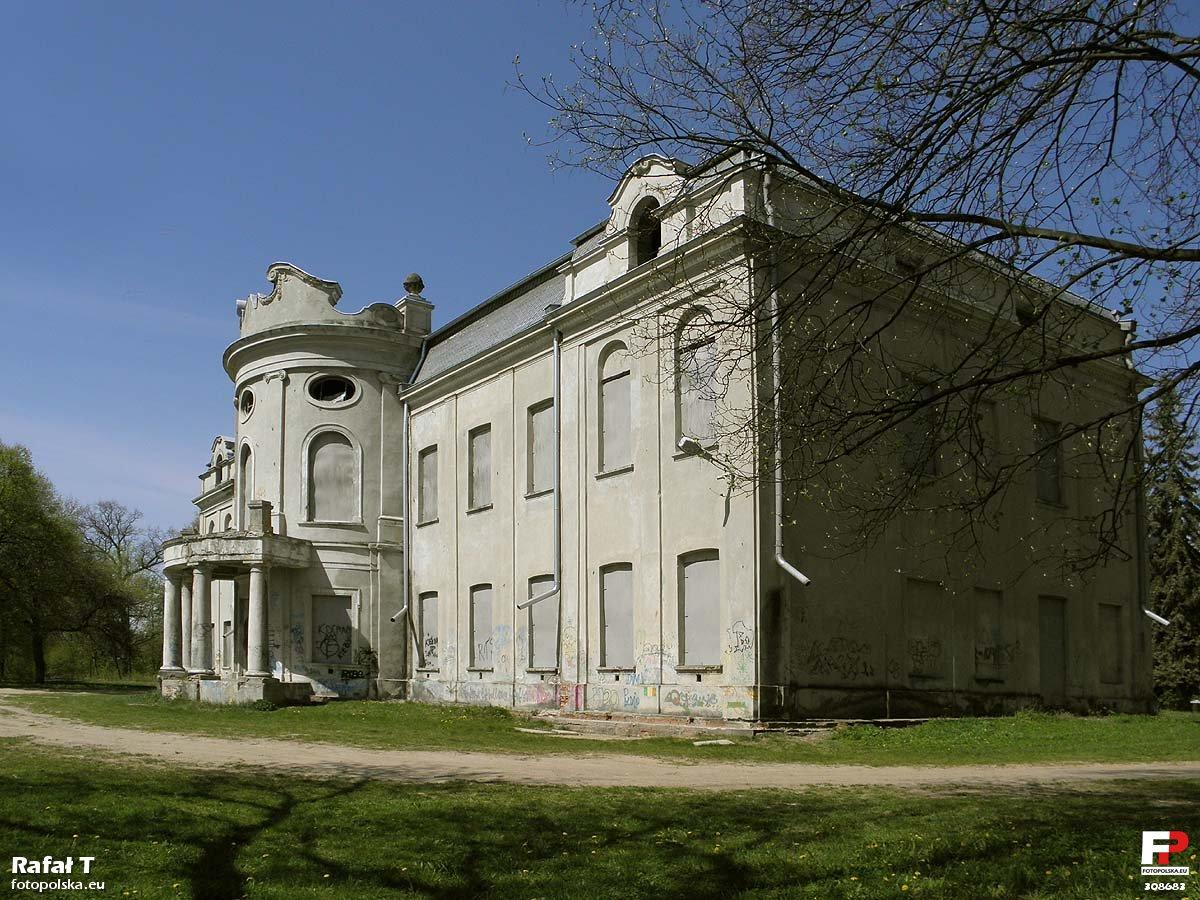
- Interactive map of the Granowski Palace area

General information
- Type: Palace
- Architectural style: Baroque
- Location: Nowe Miasto nad Pilicą, Poland
- Construction started: 1735
- Completed: 1756
- Client: Franciszek Hieronim Granowski

The Nowe Miasto nad Pilicą Palace or Granowski Palace is a Baroque palace located in Nowe Miasto nad Pilicą in central Poland, along the Pilica River. It was built in the eighteenth century by the Granowski family.

== History ==
The construction of the palace was initiated by Franciszek Hieronim Granowski some time prior to 1735 and was completed by his son, Kazimierz Granowski, in 1756. It had many owners, most importantly John of Nepomuk, who in the 1820s replaced the late Baroque window frames with Neoclassical ones, and decorated the first floor living room with molding divisions.

A hundred years later, in the interwar period, further renovation took place. The roof truss that had been damaged in the First World War was rebuilt. As a result, the roof silhouette dropped significantly, negatively impacting the visual composition of the building. In 1930, a driveway that ran in front of the building and was covered by a first floor terrace supported by columns was replaced with a balcony supported by simple corbels. Moreover, the balcony in the garden was replaced with a terrace supported by Tuscan columns.

After the end of the Second World War, the palace was converted into a high school. During that time, the granary was used as a boarding house for students and for illegal tenants who dwelled in the coach house and stables. In 1965 the building was converted into a summer camp for the children of the workers of Lodz's Industries. At the beginning of the 1990s a major renovation of the palace founded by the Regional Conservation Office and local authorities began. This renovation was interrupted in 1995 when the legal heirs to the building began an effort to reclaim their ownership.

== Design ==
The palace was designed in the late Baroque style. It consists of one story of plastered brick, built in a rectangular plan, with three avant-corps that protrude slightly above floors. It is topped by a mansard roof covered with sheet metal. The central front avant-corps is crowned with a semicircular gable. The garden has a semicircular avant-corps, crowned with a semicircular Baroque attic. The wall is flanked with columns on both sides decorated with conifer cones. The two avant-corps on both sides of the front of the palace extend far beyond the façade. The façades are stressed by vertical plaster strips. Only in the garden does the central avant-corps have decorative Ionic pilasters. The palace interior is divided into two sections: a hallway with a staircase and a living room.

== Interwar period ==
During the interwar period, two buildings stood on both sides of the palace driveway. On the western side stood a two-story granary with thick walls, probably a remnant of the court belonging to the previous owners of the property. The stables and a coach house were on the eastern side of the driveway.
