= Athletics at the 1904 Summer Olympics – Men's triple jump =

Men's triple jump at the Games of the III Olympiad
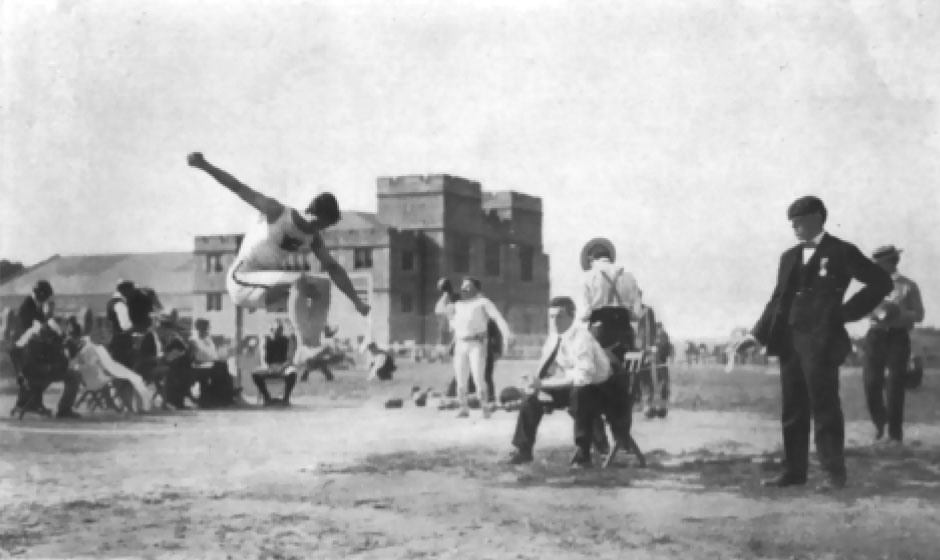
- Myer Prinstein jumping
- Venue: Francis Field
- Date: September 1, 1904
- Competitors: 7 from 1 nation
- Winning distance: 14.35

Medalists
1st place, gold medalist(s)		Myer Prinstein; United States
2nd place, silver medalist(s)		Fred Englehardt; United States
3rd place, bronze medalist(s)		Robert Stangland; United States

The men's triple jump was a track and field athletics event held as part of the athletics at the 1904 Summer Olympics programme. It was the third time the event was held. Seven athletes, all from the United States, participated. The competition was held on Thursday, September 1, 1904.

Myer Prinstein successfully defended his Olympic championship in the event, though was unable to better his previous Olympic record distance of 14.47 metres. He was the first to successfully defend (himself beating the 1896 champion, James Brendan Connolly, in 1900) and the second to receive two medals of any color (after Connolly). With only American competitors, the second consecutive U.S. medal sweep was inevitable.

== Background ==
This was the third appearance of the event, which is one of 12 athletics events to have been held at every Summer Olympics. Myer Prinstein of the United States, the defending champion, was the only jumper to return after the 1900 Games. There was no favorite as "the event was rarely held".

No nations made their debut in the event, as only the United States competed. The United States competed for the third time, having competed at each of the Games so far.

== Competition format ==
There was a single round of jumping.

== Records ==
These were the standing world and Olympic records (in metres) prior to the 1904 Summer Olympics.

World record	Matthew Roseingreue (GBR)	15.26(*)	Gort, United Kingdom of Great Britain and Ireland	28 April 1900
Olympic record	Myer Prinstein (USA)	14.47	Paris, France	16 July 1900

(*) unofficial

No new world or Olympic records were set during the competition.

== Schedule ==
Date	Time	Round
Thursday, 1 September 1904		Final

== Results ==
Rank	Athlete	Nation	Distance
1st place, gold medalist(s)	Myer Prinstein	United States	14.32
2nd place, silver medalist(s)	Fred Englehardt	United States	13.90
3rd place, bronze medalist(s)	Robert Stangland	United States	13.36
4	John Fuhrer	United States	12.91
5	Gilbert Van Cleve	United States	Unknown
6	John Hagerman	United States	Unknown
7	Samuel Jones	United States	Unknown
—	Frank Connolly	United States	DNS
—	Ray Ewry	United States	DNS
—	John Flanagan	United States	DNS
—	Edward French	United States	DNS
—	Louis Heyden	United States	DNS
—	Béla Mező	Hungary	DNS
—	Frederick Schule	United States	DNS
—	Garrett Serviss	United States	DNS

== Sources ==
- Wudarski, Pawel (1999). "Wyniki Igrzysk Olimpijskich" (in Polish).
