= John Hagerman =

American-Canadian long and triple jumper

Percy Hagerman
Personal information
- Born: October 25, 1881 Coburg, Ontario, Canada
- Died: February 21, 1960 (aged 79) Toronto, Ontario, Canada

Sport
- Sport: Athletics
- Event: long jump/triple jump
- Club: Los Angeles / Pacific AA, San Francisco

John Percival "Percy" Hagerman (October 25, 1881 – February 21, 1960) was a Canadian track and field athlete who competed in the 1904 Summer Olympics.

== Biography ==
Born in Coburg, Ontario, Hagerman competed at the 1904 Olympic Games, finishing sixth in the long jump event as well as sixth in the triple jump competition. He is a member of the Occidental College Track and Field Hall of Fame.

Hagerman finished second behind Peter O'Connor in the long jump event at the British 1906 AAA Championships.
