= Łuk coat of arms =

Polish coat of arms

Łuk
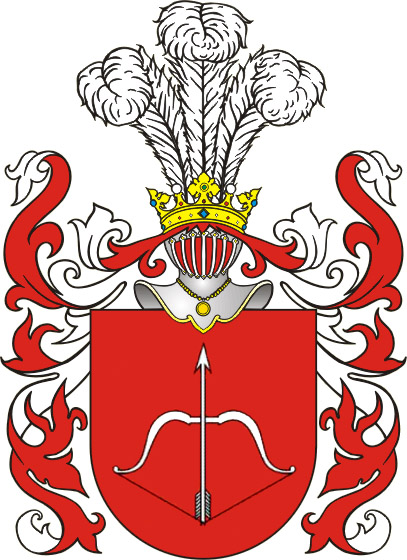
- Earliest mention: 1500s
- Towns: none
- Families: Assanowicz, Bajraszewicz, Bajraszewski, Bałakir, Bohdziewicz, Bohusz, Borysowski, Bozhychko, Brzumiński, Bublik, Burczymucha, Choromowicz, Chorumowicz, Czyczud, Dargiewicz, Derewiński, Eggert, Egort, Ejdziatowicz, Eydziatowicz, Gułak, Halecki, Halkiewicz, Hulkiewicz, Jakowlewicz, Jakóbowicz, Kamiński, Kierszański, Knichycki, Kosanowski, Kosarski, Kosarzewski, Kosicki, Kozarewski, Kozarzewski, Krukowicz, Kuleśnicki, Łuk, Łukasiewicz, Łukaszewicz, Łukaszowicz, Murzicz, Murzycz, Narkiewicz, Ołyk, Ołyka, Paluszkiewicz, Paszczyc, Paszyc, Piskarzewski, Pluszkiewicz, Podwiński, Przedżymirski, Przewalski, Radzinowicz, Rawena, Reniger, Rodziewicz, Saffarewicz, Snitowski, Śnitowski, Sulejmanowicz, Sulimanowicz, Szabłowski, Szczucki, Szehidewicz, Szułowski, Tatarowicz, Tur, Waliński, Zabołocki

Łuk (Polish for "Bow") is a Polish coat of arms. It was used by several szlachta ( noble ) families under the Polish–Lithuanian Commonwealth.

== Notable bearers ==
Notable bearers of this coat of arms have included:

== See also ==
- Polish heraldry
- Heraldry
- Coat of arms

== Sources ==
- Dynastic Genealogy
- Ornatowski.com
