= Lipski family =

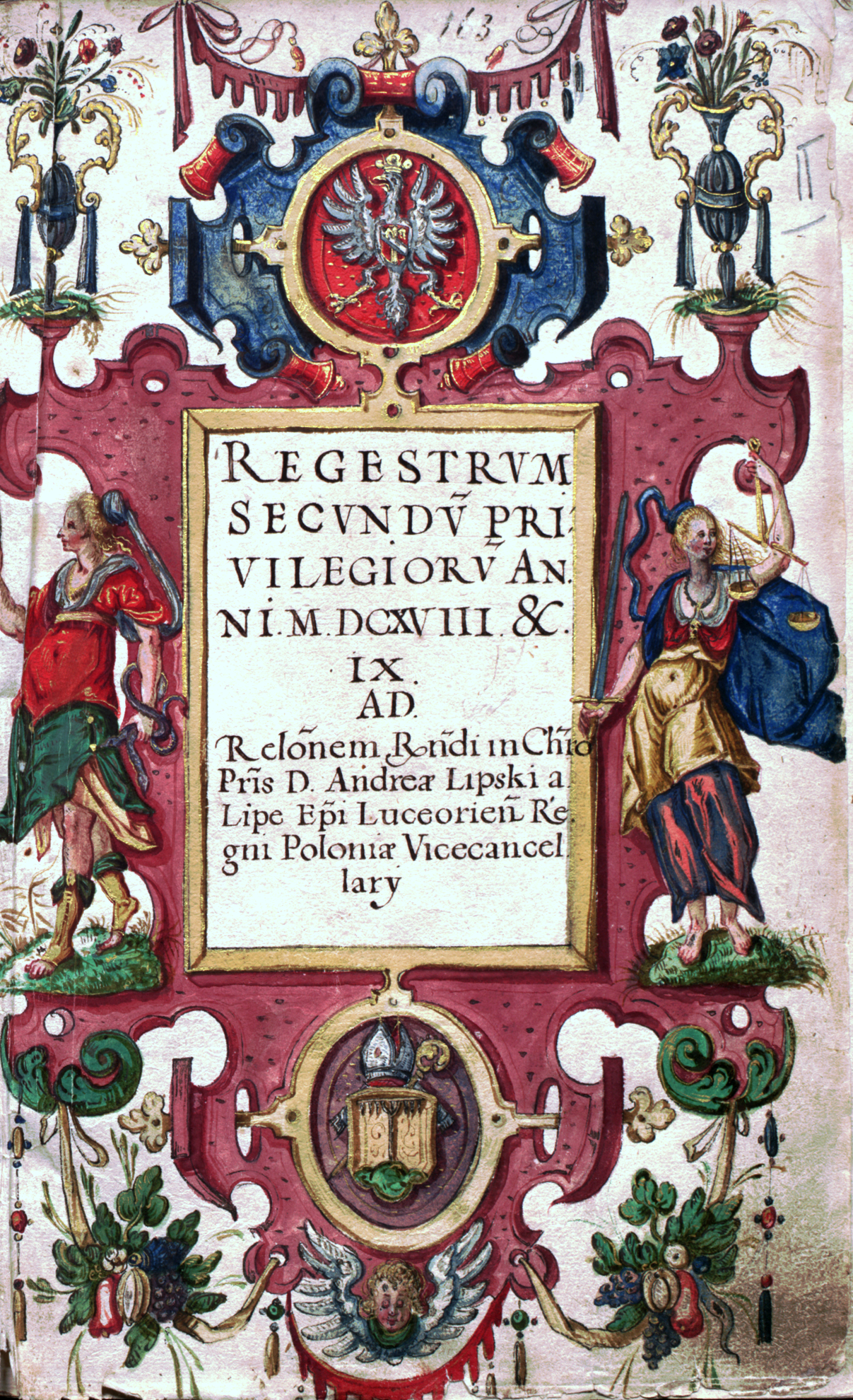
Crown Metrica 1618–1619

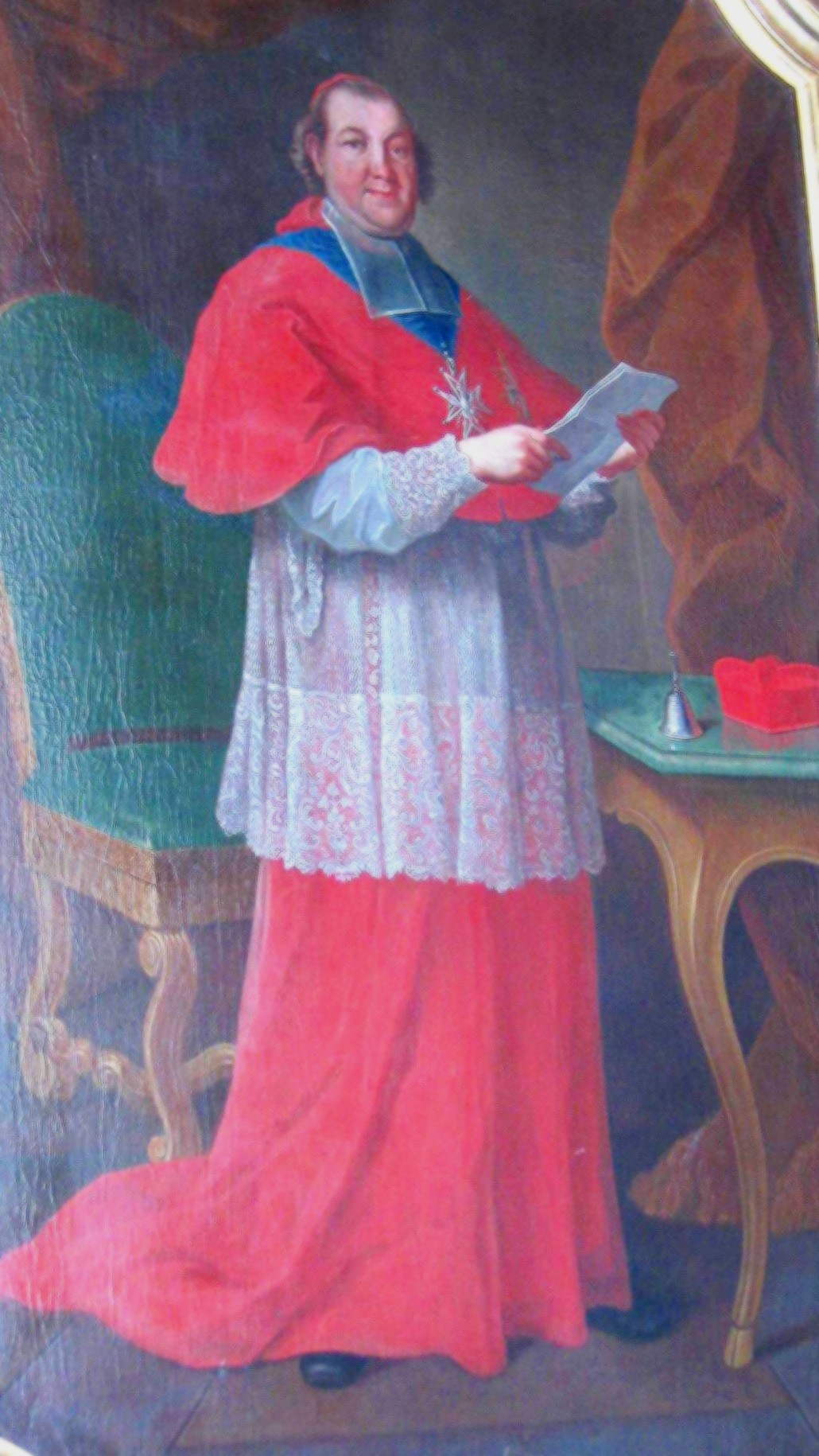
Cardinale Jan Aleksander Lipski

Lipski (plural: Lipscy, feminine form: Lipska) was a Polish noble family.

== History ==
The family originated from Lipe in Greater Poland.

== Notable members ==
- Andrzej Lipski (1572–1631) – Bishop, Grand Chancellor of the Crown
- Jacek Lipski (1799–1872) – engineer, ironmaster
- Jan Aleksander Lipski (1690–1746) – Cardinale
- Józef Lipski (1772–1817) – general, leader of the Greater Poland Uprising in the Kalisz region
- Józef Lipski (1769–1812) – rotmistrz, major-general
- Józef Lipski (1894–1958) – politician and diplomat
- Wojciech Lipski (1805–1855) – landlord

== Coat of arms ==
The family coat of arms was Grabie.

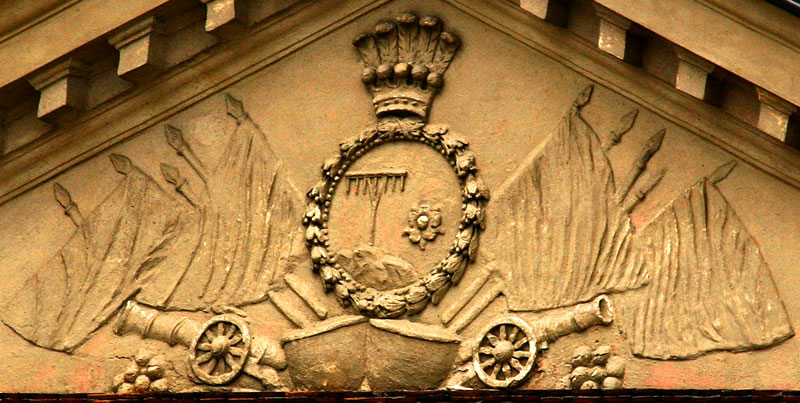
Coat of arms of the Lipski family on the Palace in Czerniejew

== Residences ==
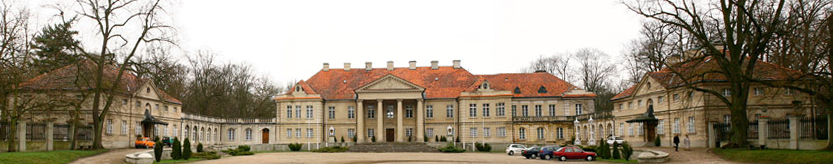
Lipski Palace in Czerniejewo

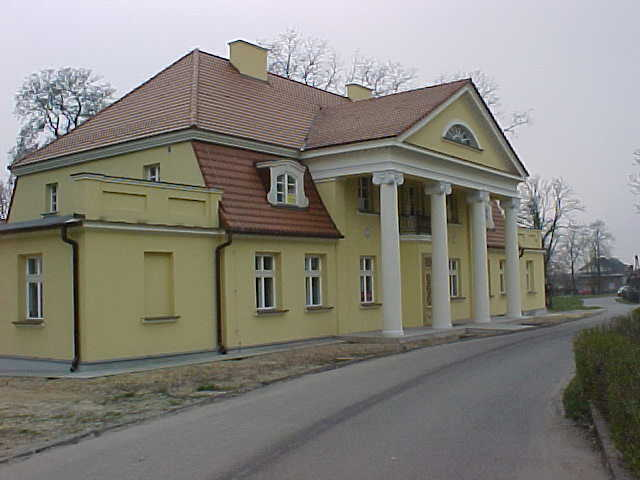
Lipski Manor House in Majków

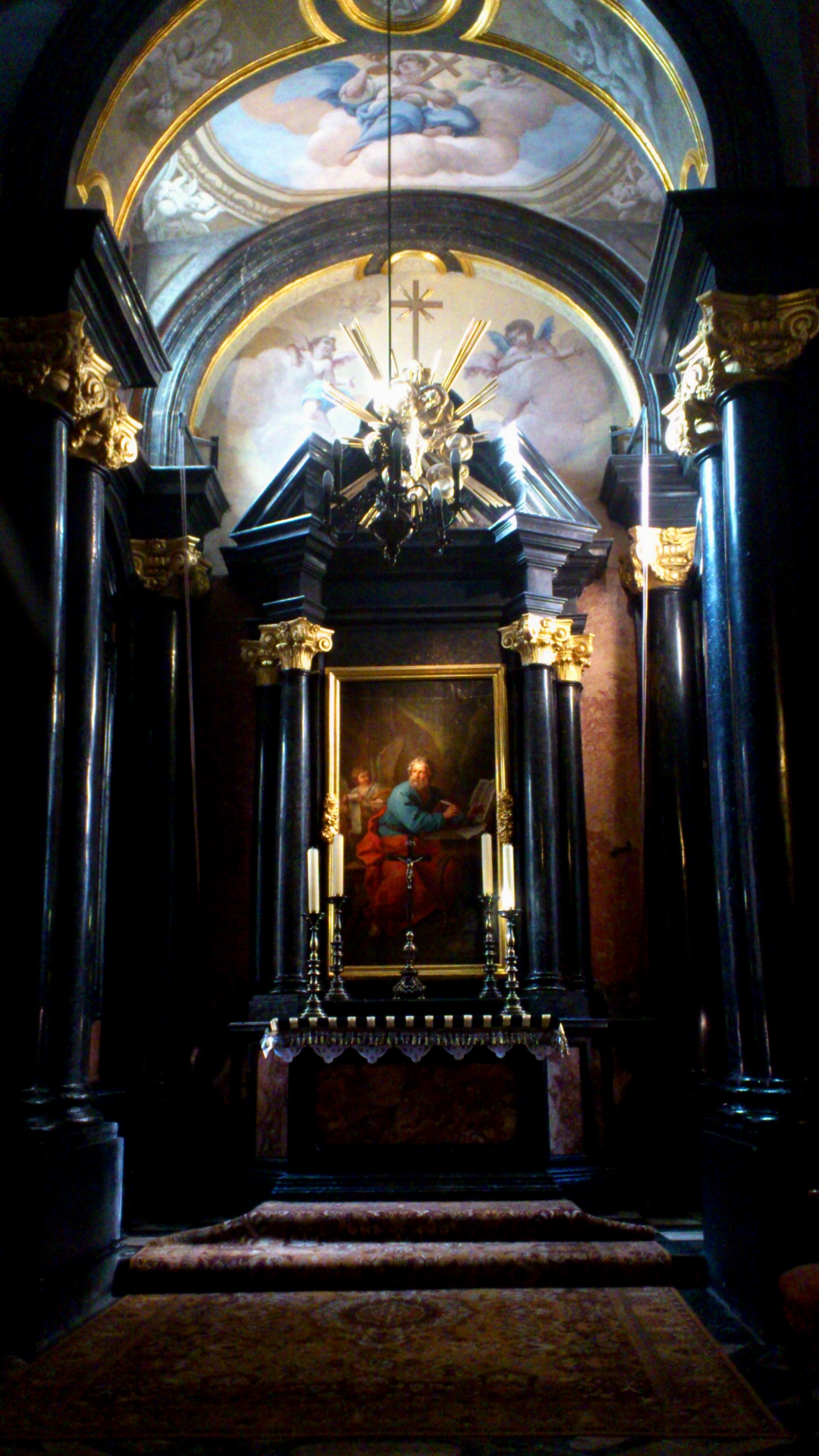
The Lipski Chapel in the Wawel Cathedral
