= Gilbert Van Cleve =

American long jumper

Personal information
- Born: December 15, 1880 Staunton, Illinois, United States
- Died: May 5, 1951 (aged 70) Chicago, Illinois

Sport
- Sport: Athletics
- Events: Long jump, triple jump

Gilbert Van Cleve (December 15, 1880 – May 5, 1951) was an American athlete. He competed in the long jump and triple jump events at the 1904 Summer Olympics.
