= John Oxley (long jumper) =

American long jumper

Personal information
- Born: October 13, 1881
- Died: November 10, 1925 (aged 44) Morrison, Illinois, U.S.

Sport
- Sport: Athletics

John Taylor Oxley, Jr. (October 13, 1881 – November 10, 1925) was an American track and field athlete who competed in the 1904 Summer Olympics. He was born on October 13, 1881. In 1904 he participated in long jump competition, but his exact placement is unknown. He died in Morrison, Illinois on November 10, 1925.
