= Daniel Frank (athlete) =

Athletics competitor

Personal information
- Full name: Daniel Gordon Frank
- Born: January 4, 1882 Boston, Massachusetts
- Died: March 20, 1965 (aged 83) New York, New York

Sport
- Club: New West Side Athletic Club

Achievements and titles
- Personal bests: long jump 7.3 meters 23 ft. 11 in. (1904)
Medal record
Men's athletics
Representing the United States
Olympic Games
Silver medal – second place	1904 St Louis	Long jump

Daniel Gordon Frank (January 4, 1882 – March 20, 1965) was an American athlete who competed mainly in the long jump. He was born in Boston, Massachusetts and was Jewish.

== 1904 Olympic silver medal ==
He competed for the United States in the 1904 Summer Olympics held in St Louis, United States in the Long Jump where he won the silver medal. Frank, who competed as a member of the New West Side Athletic Club in New York City took second winning the silver medal with a leap of 6.89 meters or 22' 7 3/4". Frank finished second to fellow Jewish American, Myer Prinstein, who set the Olympic record with a jump of 24'1" or 7.34 meters. In recent prior competition, Prinstein had lost to Frank.

In the 1904 Olympics, Frank also competed in the 440 and 5 Mile run but did not medal.

== New York AAU championships ==
In 1904, prior to the Olympics, Frank defeated Prinstein in the long jump at the New York AAU Championships with a personal best jump of 23'11-1/2".

Frank died on March 20, 1965, in New York.

== See also ==
- List of select Jewish track and field athletes
