= Grabie coat of arms =

Polish coat of arms

Grabie
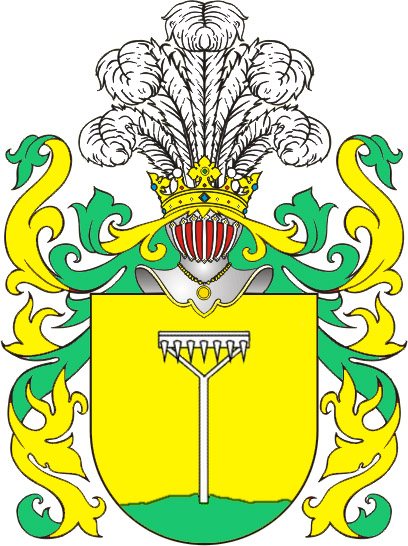
- Battle cry: Grabia, Grabie, Kocina
- Alternative names: Ciewostki, Grabia, Grabic, Grabiec, Graby, Kocina, Rastrum, Szczuki
- Earliest mention: 1342
- Towns: none

Grabie (Polish for "Rake") is a Polish coat of arms. It was used by many szlachta (noble) families in the Kingdom of Poland and later also in the Polish–Lithuanian Commonwealth, including the Grabias which is the Lithuanised form of the original Grabie coat of arms and name.

== Notable bearers ==
Notable bearers of this coat of arms have included:

- House of Szczuka
  - Stanisław Antoni Szczuka
- House of Lipski
- (( House of Kroczewski))

== Gallery ==
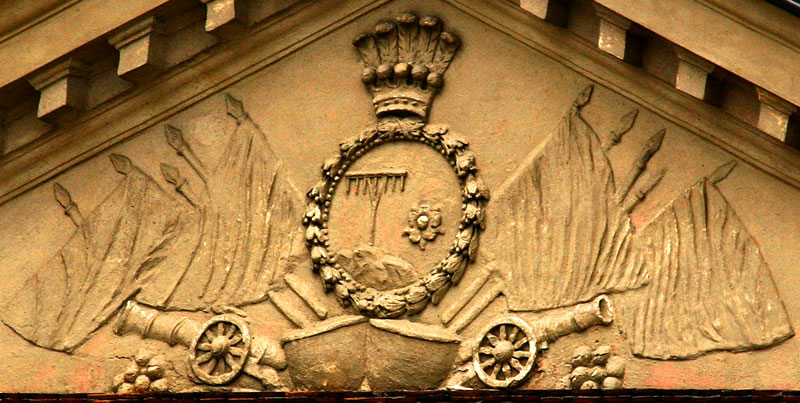
Coat of arms of the Lipski family on the palace in Czerniejew

== Bibliography ==
- Tadeusz Gajl, Herby szlacheckie Rzeczypospolitej Obojga Narodów, Gdańsk, 2003
- Andrzej Brzezina Winiarski, Herby szlachty Rzeczypospolitej, Warszawa 2006
- Kasper Niesiecki, Herbarz Polski, 1839–1846
- Bartosz Paprocki, Gniazdo Cnoty, 1578, fol. 1079. O herb fol. 562. Okol. tom. 1. fol. 229. Biel. fol. 207.
- Bartosz Paprocki, Herby Rycerstwa Polskiego, 1584
- Adam Boniecki, Herbarz Polski, wyd.II dr Marek Jerzy Minakowski, Kraków 2005
- Piotr Nałęcz Małachowski, Zbiór Nazwisk Szlachty, Lublin 1805
- Juliusz hr. Ostrowski, Księga Herbowa Rodów Polskich, Warszawa 1897

== See also ==
- Polish heraldry
- Heraldic family
- List of Polish nobility coats of arms
