= Brochwicz coat of arms =

Polish coat of arms

Brochwicz
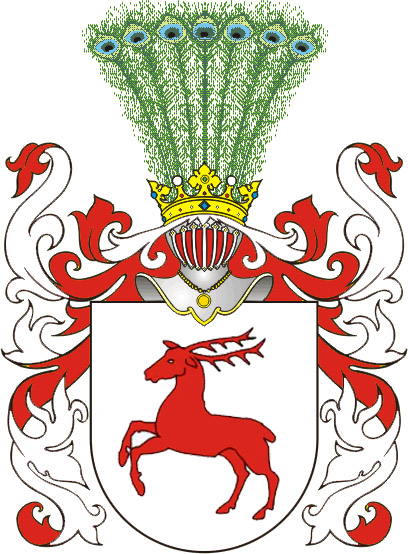
- Battle cry: Opole
- Alternative name(s): Jeleń, Opole
- Earliest mention: 1268 (seal)
- Gminas: Lublin Voivodeship
- Families: names Arndt, Bach, Bornowski, Brochowicki, Brochwicz, Broszkowski, Brygiewicz, Bryszkowski, Bujakowski, Burgrafski, Dobrocieski, Donimirski, Dubaniewski, Falęcki, Foltyński, Gockowski, Goiszewski, Goszczewski, Grabania, Gustkowski, Hotork, Idzik, Kątski, Korczyc, Korczycki, Kleman, Lewiński, Mokrzański, Oreski, Orzelski, Ossowski, Palbicki, Palęcki, Pałęckilink correction, Parasiewicz, Połomski, Potkański, Pruszkowski, Rogoyski, Roik (Brochwicz 3), Sernik, Słoński, Sobek, Sobiewolski, Starorypiński, Stocki, Sulejowski (Sulejewski), Szalowski, Szczucki, Szmakowski, Szydłowski, Szymaniecki, Trawnicki, Trembecki, Wiktor, Witowski, Wojakowski, Worakowski, Wroński, Zakrzewski, Zelewski, Zieliński, Zuchta, Żeromski

Brochwicz is a Polish coat of arms. It was used by several szlachta families.

== History ==
According to Tomasz Jurek, both, the coat of arms Brochwicz (Stag; Polish: Jeleń) and its name could have been shaped already in the 12th century. According to this researcher, several Silesian coats of arms shown in miniatures in the "Lubin Codex", including the coat of arms Brochwicz, belonged to families with old certificates and Polish origin and Polish connections. According to Józef Szymański, the Brochwicz coat of arms, which can be found among those depicted in the miniatures of the "Lubin Codex", has references to forms known in Polish heraldry. Its appearance reflects heraldic situation prevailing in Silesia in the mid-fourteenth century. Consequently, strong foreign influence shaped its appearance. The first mention of the coat of arms dates back to the Teutonic Order period, and more detailed information is found in 1544. The name Brochwicz probably comes from the word "paroháč" (a stag), transformed into "broháč" and then polonized to the form "Brochwicz". The origin of the coat of arms, however, does not need to be Czech. Medieval Polish and Czech languages, both Slavic, had a lot of similarities (for example, the Czech word "ať" was used instead of the word "niech" /"let"/).

== Blazon ==
In the silver field red stag with front legs raised up, with a gold crown on the neck. Peacock feathers in the jewel over the helmet.

In numerous versions of the Brochwicz coat of arms there is also golden or red background. The colour of the stag is usually red, sometimes black or silver. There are also known cases, where the stag is pictured sitting. The oldest image of the coat of arms appears on the seal of Sobiesław Przebimiłowic (Przybysławic) dating from 1268. Second oldest the seal of Michał (Michael) Mironowic from Sośnica from 1282. On the seal of Sobiesław it was depicted with a beam between horns. The seal of Michał depicts a deer with a horn of five appendages. The oldest coloured heraldic witness of the appearance of the Brochwicz coat of arms is the "Codex of Lubin" ("Legend of St. Hedwig") from 1353. The coat of arms was depicted in miniatures depicting Silesian knights participating in the Battle of Legnica against the invasion of the Mongols. It depicts black deer with head raised up, turned to the right, on a silver background.

== Notable bearers ==
Notable bearers of this coat of arms include:

- House of Kątski: Marcin Kątski (1636–1710)
- Eduard von Lewinski (1829–1906) – Prussian general
- Tadeusz Wiktor (1859–1922) – general
- Janusz Brochwicz-Lewiński (1920–2017) – member of the Home Army (Armia Krajowa), battalion "Parasol" in Warsaw Uprising (1944).
- Bronisław Brochwicz-Rogoyski (1861–1921) – architect
- Wanda Broszkowska-Piklikiewicz (1926–2019) – member of the Home Army (Armia Krajowa) during WW2.
- Stanisław Sobek z Sułowa (died 1569) – great podskarbi of the crown

== Gallery ==
Brochwicz (odm.)

Brochwicz I

Brochwicz II

Brochwicz III

Brochwicz IV

== See also ==
- Polish heraldry
- Heraldic family
- List of Polish nobility coats of arms

== Bibliography ==
- Marek Cetwiński: Rycerstwo śląskie do końca XII w. : biogramy i rodowody / Nights of Silesia to the end of 12th c. : biographies and genealogies Wrocław-Warszawa-Kraków-Gdańsk-Łódź: Zakład Narodowy im Ossolińskich – Wydawnictwo PAN, 1982. ISBN 83-04-01118-2
- Jerzy Łojek: Średniowieczne herby polskie / Polish medieval coats of arms. Poznań: Krajowa Agencja Wydawnicza, 1985, s. 23-24, ilustr.. ISBN 8303010808.
- Józef Szymański: Herbarz średniowiecznego rycerstwa polskiego / Armorial of Polish medieval knights. Warszawa: Wydawnictwo Naukowe PWN, 1993, s. 13-14. ISBN 8301097973.
