= Peter O'Connor (athlete) =

Irish track and field athlete

Personal information
- Born: 24 October 1872 Millom, Cumberland, England
- Died: 9 November 1957 (aged 85) Waterford, Ireland

Sport
- Sport: Athletics
- Event: long jump / triple jump / high jump
- Club: Irish Intacta Harriers
Medal record
Representing Great Britain
Intercalated Games
Gold medal – first place	Athens 1906	Hop, Step & Jump
Silver medal – second place	Athens 1906	Long Jump

Peter O'Connor (24 October 1872 – 9 November 1957) was an Irish track and field athlete who set a long-standing world record for the long jump and won two Olympic medals in the 1906 Intercalated Games.

== Early career ==
Born in Millom, Cumberland, England, on 24 October 1872, O'Connor grew up in Wicklow, County Wicklow, Ireland. He joined the Gaelic Athletic Association (GAA) in 1896. In 1899, he won All-Ireland medals in long jump, high jump and hop, step and jump (triple jump).

Over the next ten years he consistently beat British athletes in international competitions: the (British) Amateur Athletic Association invited him to represent Britain in the Olympic Games in 1900, but he refused, as he only wished to represent Ireland. O'Connor won six consecutive AAA Championships long jump titles from 1901 to 1906 and two long jump titles from 1903 and 1904.

== World record ==
As of June 1900, the world record for the long jump was held by Myer Prinstein of Syracuse University, at 24 ft 7¼ins (~7.50m). In 1900 and 1901, competing with the Irish Amateur Athletic Association (IAAA), a rival association to the GAA, O'Connor set several unofficial world records in the long jump. He set an officially recognised world record of 24 ft 9ins (~7.54m) at the Royal Dublin Society's grounds in Dublin on 27 May 1901. On 5 August 1901 he jumped 24 ft 11¾ins (7.61m) in Dublin. This was the first IAAF recognised long jump world record. It caused a sensation at the time, being only a fraction short of the 25 ft (7.62m) barrier, and remained unbeaten for 20 years, a longevity surpassed only by Jesse Owens's 25-year record and Bob Beamon's 23-year record and by the current record of Mike Powell. It remained an Irish record for a remarkable 89 years.

== 1906 Olympic Games ==
The flag waved by Peter O'Connor at the 1906 Olympics

In 1906 O'Connor and two other athletes, Con Leahy and John Daly, were entered for the Intercalated Games in Athens by the IAAA and GAA, representing Ireland. They were given green blazers and cap with a gold shamrock, and an Irish flag (the ‘Erin Go Bragh’ flag). However, the rules of the games were changed so that only athletes nominated by National Olympic Committees were eligible. Ireland did not have an Olympic Committee, and the British Olympic Council claimed the three. On registering for the Games, O'Connor and his fellow-athletes found that they were listed as Great Britain, not Irish, team members.

In the long jump competition, O'Connor finally met Myer Prinstein of the Irish American Athletic Club who was competing for the U.S. team and whose world record O'Connor had broken five years previously. The only judge for the competition was Matthew Halpin, who was manager of the American team. O'Connor protested, fearing bias, but was overruled. He continued to protest Halpin's decisions through the remainder of the competition. The distances were not announced until the end of the competition. When they were, Prinstein was declared the winner, with O'Connor in Silver Medal position.

At the flag-raising ceremony, in protest at the flying of the Union Flag for his second place, O'Connor scaled a flagpole in the middle of the field and waved the Irish flag, while the pole was guarded by Con Leahy.

In the hop, step and jump competition two days later, O'Connor beat his fellow-countryman, Con Leahy, to win the gold medal. At 34, he was the oldest ever Gold Medal winner in this event. Prinstein, the champion in 1900 and 1904, did not feature in the medals.

== Later career ==
O'Connor won no more titles after 1906. He remained involved in athletics all his life. He was a founder member and first Vice-President of Waterford Athletic Club, and attended later Olympics both as judge and spectator. He practised as a solicitor in Waterford, and was married with nine children. He died in Waterford on 9 November 1957.
