= Fred Englehardt =

American track and field athlete

Olympic medal record

Men's athletics

Representing the United States
Silver medal – second place	1904 St Louis	Triple jump

Frederick William Englehardt (also written as Engelhardt; May 14, 1879 in New York, New York – July 25, 1942 in Bronx, New York) was an American athlete who competed mainly in the long jump and triple jump. He competed for the United States in the 1904 Summer Olympics held in St Louis, United States in the triple jump where he won the silver medal. He was also 4th in the long jump.

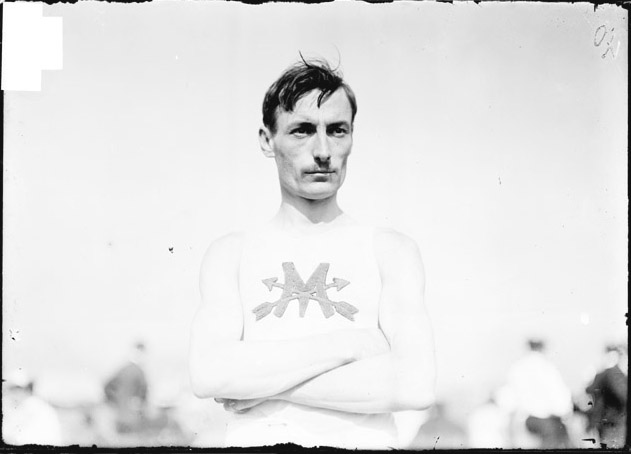
Fred Englehardt, 1904

== See also ==
List of Pennsylvania State University Olympians
