= Myer Prinstein =

American track athlete

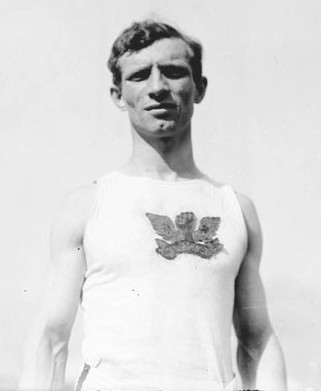
- Prinstein at 26 in 1904, in the Winged-Fist Jersey of the Irish-American Athletic Club

Personal information
- Born: Mejer Prinsztejn; December 22, 1878 Szczuczyn, Congress Poland, Russian Empire (present-day Poland)
- Died: March 10, 1925 (aged 46) New York City, United States
- Education: Syracuse U. 1902, Law
- Occupations: Business, Law
- Height: 171 cm (5 ft 7 in) (sources vary)
- Weight: 74 kg (163 lb)
- Spouses: Henrietta Northshield m. 1908
- Children: 1 b. June 1916

Sport
- Club: Irish American Athletic Club, Syracuse U.
Medal record
Men's athletics
Representing the United States
Olympic Games
Gold medal – first place	1900 Paris	Triple jump
Gold medal – first place	1904 St. Louis	Triple jump
Gold medal – first place	1904 St. Louis	Long jump
Silver medal – second place	1900 Paris	Long jump
Intercalated Games
Gold medal – first place	1906 Athens	Long jump

Myer Prinstein (born Mejer Prinsztejn, December 22, 1878 – March 10, 1925) was a Poland-born American track and field athlete who held the world record for the long jump in 1900 and won four gold medals in three Olympic Games for the long jump and triple jump. He was a member of the Irish American Athletic Club in Queens, New York. A 1902 law graduate and track team captain for Syracuse University, after college he became a New York real estate lawyer and businessman while living in Jamaica Plains, Queens. To date, he is the only Olympic track athlete to win both the triple and long jump in the same Olympics, earning the distinction in St. Louis in 1904.

== Early life ==
Prinstein was Jewish and was born in Szczuczyn, in Russian-ruled Congress Poland. His parents, Jacob and Julia Prinstein (born Jankiel Prinsztejn and Judes Rubinsztejn), emigrated to New York City. In 1883, when Myer was five, the family moved to Syracuse and resided at 724 Orange Street, currently McBride St., in the predominantly Jewish neighborhood of the 7th Ward, on the East side of downtown. Myer began competing in track and field while he attended the public Syracuse High School, which later became Central High, and he was a member of the local YMCA team. The family had five daughters and four sons; his father Jacob was a grocer and baker. Myer was the third oldest son and the fourth child.

Enrolling in 1897, Prinstein was captain of the Syracuse University track team, and graduated with a law degree in 1902. After graduating college, he moved to Jamaica, Queens, New York to practice law, where he was a member and competitor for the highly accomplished Irish American Athletic Club.

In 1908 he married Henrietta Northshield, who had been a New York City school teacher, and they had a son, Elsner, known as Eddie, born in June 1916.

== World record ==
In what was most likely his most significant athletic accomplishment outside of the Olympic games, while competing for Syracuse, Prinstein set a running long jump world record of 7.235 m (23 ft 8 7/8 in), increasing the prior record by several feet, in New York on June 11, 1898. However, the record was soon broken, first by William Newburn of Ireland on June 18, 1898, and then by future rival Alvin Kraenzlein on May 26, 1899.

On April 28, 1900, Prinstein set a new world record of 7.50 m (24 ft 7 1/4 in) at Philadelphia's Penn Relays. Four months later, on August 29, 1900, this record was also broken by Peter O'Connor of Ireland.

A versatile track and field athlete, besides specializing in the long and triple jumps, he ran sprints and relays, pole-vaulted, hurdled, and high-jumped during collegiate competition at Syracuse. He even played on one of the school's earliest basketball teams. He was lean but not exceedingly tall, and though his height estimates from various sources vary, Syracuse University publications place his height at 5 ft 7 3/4 in (172.1 cm).

== Olympic games ==
Prinstein won the silver medal in the long jump at the 1900 Summer Olympics in Paris, France, losing to Alvin Kraenzlein after being denied permission by Syracuse officials to compete in the final because it was contested on a Sunday – despite the fact that Prinstein was a Jew, and Kraenzlein, who was a Christian, did compete. The two had had an informal agreement not to compete on Sunday: when Prinstein learned that Kraenzlein had competed, he became angry and, depending on the account, punched Kraenzlein in the face or was restrained from doing so. Sportsmanship was important to Prinstein, and despite their rivalry, he and Kraenzlein, a four-time gold medalist in 1904, became good friends and remained so throughout Prinstein's life. The following day, Prinstein won the gold medal in the hop, step and jump (triple jump), beating 1896 champion James Connolly with a leap of 14.47 meters which simultaneously set the Olympic Record.

Competing as a member of the Irish American Athletic Club in the St. Louis Olympics in 1904, he won both the long jump (setting an Olympic record) and the hop, step and jump on the same day, the only athlete ever to win both events in the same games. He also came 5th in both the 60 m and 400 m dash.

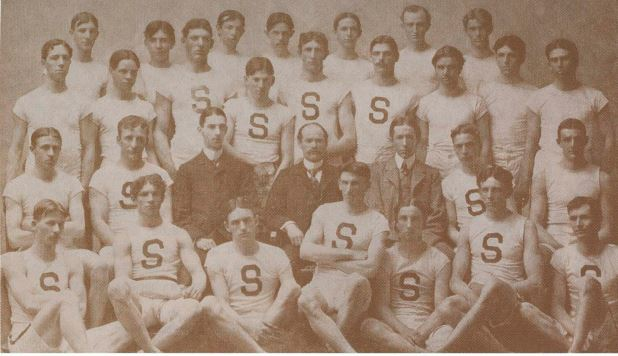
Prinstein (front row, 2nd from left), with the 1899 Syracuse Track Team

In Athens 1906 he again won the long jump competition, beating the world record holder, Peter O'Connor. The only judge for the competition was Matthew Halpin, who was manager of the American team. O'Connor protested, but was overruled. He continued to protest Halpin's decisions through the remainder of the competition. The distances were not announced until the end of the competition. When they were, Prinstein had won with his very first jump. Malcolm Ford, a sportswriter who had once been a long-jumper, wrote in the New York Mail and Express, "The great feature of his (Prinstein's) jumping is the rise which he gets after leaving takeoff...He has an unusually pretty style and impresses one that he always knows what he is doing."

== Later career ==
Prinstein in Syracuse University Track Gear

Prinstein did not compete in the Olympics after 1906. He began the practice of law in Syracuse, and after graduation around 1902 practiced predominantly real estate law in New York City, while living in Jamaica, Queens. By 1904 he had a stationery business, a real estate company, and a business selling legal forms to lawyers, in addition to his law practice. In mid-October 1910, he was reported to be guilty of unprofessional conduct to the Appellate division of the Supreme Court. A former Supreme Court Justice Gildersleeve recommended Prinstein be suspended from practice for one year. On February 10, 1911, Prinstein was officially disbarred for a period by the Appellate division of the Supreme Court as a result of fraud in connection with a $200 payment he was given by a client to close a real estate transaction. Prinstein provided a bank statement verifying he deposited the $200 on September 19, 1907, but it was later found Prinstein had spent the money. A six-month suspension was recommended by ex-Justice Gildersleeve. Several sources claim he was a lawyer in good standing prior to the incident. After his temporary disbarment ended in the summer of 1911, Prinstein may have continued to practice law or as a Syracuse University website claims, he focused more on his businesses.

He died on March 10, 1925, at age 46 of a heart ailment at Mount Sinai Hospital, New York, after having been hospitalized for three months. He was survived by his widow, Henrietta, and a young son, Elsner or Eddie who was nine. Henrietta served as Secretary of the Temple Israel Sisterhood in 1920.

== Honors ==
Myer Prinstein was inducted into the International Jewish Sports Hall of Fame in 1982. In 2000, he was inducted as a member into the National Track and Field Hall of Fame, in New York City, and in 2008 he was inducted into the Greater Syracuse Sports Hall of Fame. In April 2001, he was enshrined on the Penn Relays Wall of Fame in Philadelphia, where he had set his world long jump record in 1900.

== See also ==
- List of Jewish American athletes
- List of select Jewish track and field athletes
