= Deaths in October 1986 =

The following is a list of notable deaths in October 1986.

Entries for each day are listed alphabetically by surname. A typical entry lists information in the following sequence:

- Name, age, country of citizenship at birth, subsequent country of citizenship (if applicable), reason for notability, cause of death (if known), and reference.

== October 1986 ==
=== 1 ===
- Archie League, 79, American air traffic controller.
- William Manning, 83, Australian politician, member of the Western Australian Legislative Assembly (1956-1974).
- Seán Moore, 73, Irish politician, member of Dáil Éireann, Lord Mayor of Dublin.
- Fernand Picard, 69, Canadian politician, member of the National Assembly of Quebec (1966-1976).
- John Potts, 82, English footballer.
- Dražen Ričl, 24, Yugoslav rock musician (Crvena jabuka) and comedian, traffic collision.
- Frank Samblebe, 71, Australian rules footballer.

=== 2 ===
- Ron Rutherford, 80, Australian rules footballer.
- F. Wayne Valley, 72, American businessman and football executive, owner of Oakland Raiders, cancer.

=== 3 ===
- Vince DiMaggio, 74, American Major League baseball player (Pittsburgh Pirates), brother of Joe DiMaggio, colon cancer.
- Shunzo Kido, 97, Japanese Olympic equestrian (1928, 1932).
- Heinie Mueller, 74, American Major League Baseball player (Philadelphia Phillies).
- Sergey Preminin, 20, Soviet navy sailor, averted meltdown in nuclear submarine K-219, hyperthermia.
- Han Xianchu, 73, Chinese general in the People's Liberation Army.

=== 4 ===
- Raymond E. Baldwin, 93, American politician, member of the U.S. Senate and Governor of Connecticut.
- Robert Broadbent, 81, Australian Olympic cyclist (1924).
- Mike Butterworth, 62, British comic book writer (The Trigan Empire), heart attack.
- Jeff Clements, 54, English rugby union player.
- Sarala Devi, 82, Indian politician and social activist, member of Odisha Legislative Assembly.
- Arno von Lenski, 93, Nazi German Wehrmacht general and politician.
- Raimundo Morales, 88, Spanish Olympic tennis player (1924).
- Desiderius Orban, 101, Hungarian and Australian painter, kidney disease.
- Valentín Sabate, 64, Spanish Olympic water polo player (1948).

=== 5 ===
- George Packer Berry, 87, American physician and medical educator.
- Mike Burgmann, 39, Australian racing driver, racing crash.
- Timothy Creasey, 63, British army general.
- Abraham Feinberg, 87, American rabbi, activist and singer, cancer.
- Rudolf Flesch, 75, Austrian-born American readability expert and author (Why Johnny Can't Read).
- William Karlsen, 76 Norwegian Olympic backstroke swimmer (1932).
- Zdzisław Kumiszcze, 49, Polish Olympic hurdler (1960).
- Collette Lyons, 78, American actress, wife of George Randolph Hearst.
- Héctor Maturano, 65, Argentine Olympic boxer (1952).
- Mairin Mitchell, 91, British and Irish writer and journalist.
- Peter Phelps, 77, English cricketer.
- Emanuel Sayles, 79, American jazz banjoist.
- Hal B. Wallis, 87, American film producer (Casablanca, True Grit, The Adventures of Robin Hood), diabetes.
- James H. Wilkinson, 67, English mathematician (Wilkinson matrix, Wilkinson's polynomial), heart attack.

=== 6 ===
- Marie-Hélène Arnaud, 52, French model and actress, the "face of Chanel".
- Yuri Babayev, 58, Soviet physicist, co-designers of the Tsar Bomba.
- Gokulbhai Bhatt, 88, Indian politician and social worker, Chief Minister of Sirohi State.
- Harold Brooke, 87, Australian Olympic sailor (1960).
- Robert L. Larson, 88, American jurist.
- Tom Ledwidge, 75, Australian rules footballer.
- Guy Prendergast, 81, British army officer and explorer.
- David Rubinoff, 89, Russian-born American violinist.
- Robert Six, 79, American businessman, CEO of Continental Airlines.
- Wallace Wade, 94, American football player and sports coach.

=== 7 ===
- Allan Macy Butler, 92, American pediatrician.
- Cheryl Crawford, 84, American theatre producer and director (Group Theatre).
- Irvine Finlay Corbett, 71, Canadian politician, plane crash.
- Arthur Galsworthy, 70, British diplomat, High Commissioner to New Zealand, ambassador to the Republic of Ireland.
- Yōjirō Ishizaka, 86, Japanese novelist and short story writer.
- Iwan Iwanoff, 67, Bulgarian and Australian architect, pneumonia.
- Liu Bocheng, 93, Chinese general in the People's Liberation Army.
- Jerzy Łojek, 54, Polish historian.
- David D. O'Malley, 73, American politician, member of the Wisconsin State Assembly (1958-1977).
- Janina Oszast, 78, Polish biologist and resistance movement member.
- George Owens, 86, Australian rules footballer.
- J. G. Phillips, 75, Australian economist, Governor of the Reserve Bank of Australia, suicide.
- Paul Tournier, 88, Swiss physician and pastoral counselor, cancer.

=== 8 ===
- Nels Anderson, 97, American sociologist and author (The Hobo).
- Walter Burkemo, 67, American golfer, PGA Championship winner.
- Gerhard Dietrich, 58, German pedagogue.
- Ícaro Mello, 72, Brazilian Olympic high jumper (1936).
- Edna Roper, 73, Australian politician.
- Shadi Abdel Salam, 56, Egyptian film director and screenwriter (The Night of Counting the Years).
- Max Surkont, 64, American Major League baseball player (Boston/Milwaukee Braves).

=== 9 ===
- Lajos Balogh, Hungarian Olympic long jumper (1928).
- Eddie Johnson, 58, American Olympic boxer (1948).
- Harald Reinl, 78, Austrian film director (Chariots of the Gods), murdered.
- James J. Reynolds, Jr., 79, American civil servant, Under Secretary of Labor.
- Jo-Jo White, 77, American Major League baseball player (Detroit Tigers).

=== 10 ===
- Lyndall Barbour, 70, Australian actress.
- Gerold Braunmühl, 51, West German diplomat, assassinated.
- Mary Cholmondeley, 80, British socialite and heiress.
- Antonio di Benedetto, 63, Argentinian novelist (Zama).
- Han Drijver, 59, Dutch Olympic field hockey player. (1948, 1952).
- Nieves Hernández, 84, Mexican Olympic footballer (1928).
- Sigfred Jensen, 77, Danish footballer.
- Rusty Lane, 87, American actor and college professor (Crime with Father).
- Marie Neurath, 88, German and English designer and illustrator of children's books, co-developer of Isotype.
- Frank O'Neal, 65, American cartoonist.
- Michele Pellegrino, 83, Italian cardinal.
- Michael Player, 25–26, American serial killer (Skid Row Slayer), suicide.
- Priaulx Rainier, 83, South African–born British composer.
- Russ Van Atta, 80, American Major League baseball player (St. Louis Browns).
- Gleb Wataghin, 86, Ukrainian-Italian physicist.

=== 11 ===
- Gregorio Álvarez, 96, Argentinian historian and physician.
- Bob Brooker, 59, Australian rules footballer.
- Norm Cash, 52, American Major League baseball player (Detroit Tigers), drowned.
- John Crockett, 68, British television and stage director.
- Georges Dumézil, 88, French linguist, stroke.
- Barker Fairley, 99, British-born Canadian painter and literary scholar.
- David Hand, 86, American animator (Walt Disney Productions), stroke.
- Gyula Kovács, 69, Hungarian Olympic wrestler (1948, 1952, 1956).
- Boris Leven, 78, Russian-born American production designer and Academy Award winner (West Side Story).
- Ed McNamara, 65, Canadian actor (For Gentlemen Only, Bayo).
- Bronte Clucas Quayle, 66, Australian barrister, civil servant, and solicitor.
- Al Ullman, 72, American politician, member of the U.S. House of Representatives, prostate cancer.

=== 12 ===
- Szabolcs Fényes, 74, Hungarian composer.
- John J. Herrera, 76, American attorney and activist, president of the League of United Latin American Citizens.
- George Mandy, 80, South African cricketer.

=== 13 ===
- Maidie Andrews, 93, English actress.
- Eunice Crowther, 70, British singer, dancer, and choreographer.
- Ken Earl, 60, English cricketer.
- Abram Hill, 76, American playwright (On Strivers Row), co-founded American Negro Theatre, emphysema.
- Fred K. Mahaffey, 52, American army general, commander in chief U.S. Readiness Command, cancer.
- Sir Joseph Napier, 4th Baronet, 91, British baronet and soldier.
- William Passmore, 71, South African Olympic boxer (1936).
- Hermann von Siemens, 101, German industrialist, chairman of Siemens.

=== 14 ===
- Milovan Ćirić, 68, Yugoslav footballer and manager (Red Star Belgrade).
- Shepard J. Crumpacker Jr., 69, American politician, member of the United States House of Representatives (1951-1957).
- Yvette Dugay, 54, American actress (Cattle Queen of Montana).
- Spec O'Donnell, 75, American actor.
- Takanori Ogisu, 84, Japanese-born French painter.
- Barry Salvage, 39, English footballer (Brentford, Millwall), heart attack.
- Keenan Wynn, 70, American actor (The Hucksters), pancreatic cancer.
- Takahiko Yamanouchi, 84, Japanese theoretical physicist (quantum mechanics).

=== 15 ===
- Al Stricklin, 78, American pianist.
- Alex Josey, 76, British-Singaporean journalist, known for biography of Lee Kuan Yew, Parkinson's disease.
- Larry Kopf, 95, American Major League Baseball player.
- Rani Padmini, 23–24, Indian actress (Parankimala, Kilikkonjal), murdered.
- Jacqueline Roque, 60, French wife of Pablo Picasso, suicide.
- Marcus Samuel, 77, British businessman and hereditary peer, director of Lloyds Bank.
- Jerry Smith, 43, American NFL footballer (Washington Redskins), AIDS.
- Freule Wttewaall van Stoetwegen, 85, Dutch politician, member of the Netherlands House of Representatives (1945-1971).

=== 16 ===
- Manolo Álvarez Mera, 62, Cuban-born tenor.
- Harold Beamish, 90, New Zealand WW1 flying ace.
- Joseph Fontaine, 86, Canadian politician, member of the House of Commons of Canada (1945-1957).
- Arthur Grumiaux, 65, Belgian violin virtuoso, stroke.
- Yukihiko Haida, 77, American composer and ukulele player.
- Giovanni Invernizzi, 60, Italian Olympic rower (1948, 1952).
- Sydney Jagbir, 73, Trinidadian cricketer.
- Manas Mukherjee, 43, Indian composer.
- Sandro Puppo, 68, Italian footballer and manager (Venezia, Italy), Olympic gold medalist.
- Carlo Romei, 61, Italian politician.
- Ted Sagar, 76, English international footballer (Everton, England).
- Jacques Van Caelenberghe, 76, Belgian footballer.
- Princess Yolanda of Savoy, 85, Italian royal, daughter of Victor Emmanuel III, heart failure.

=== 17 ===
- Boris Arkadyev, 87, Soviet footballer and coach (Soviet Union).
- Jean Bidot, 81, French cyclist.
- Malcolm Burns, 76, New Zealand agricultural scientist, university lecturer and administrator.
- Hamish Fraser, 73, Scottish journalist and political activist, Red Terror participant.
- Stan Judkins, 79, Australian rules footballer (Richmond).
- Ron Kass, 51, American film producer (Naked Yoga), cancer.
- Leah Rhodes, 84, American costume designer (Adventures of Don Juan).
- Carlos Rodríguez, 77, Mexican Olympic sports shooter (1952).
- René Thirifays, 66, Belgian footballer.

=== 18 ===
- Earl Frederick Crabb, 87, Canadian WWI flying ace.
- Sverre Ingolf Haugli, Norwegian Olympic speed skater (1952, 1956).
- Niat Qabool Hayat Kakakhel, 81, Pakistani politician.
- Clyde S. Kilby, 84, American writer, founded Marion E. Wade Center.
- John J. McNamara, 54, American author and Olympic sailor (1964).
- Wilhelm Orlik-Rückemann, 92, Polish army general.

=== 19 ===
- Moses Asch, 80, Polish-born American recording engineer and executive, founder of Folkways Records.
- Aquino de Bragança, 62, Indian-born Mozambican journalist and diplomat, plane crash.
- Karlo Bulić, 76, Croatian actor (Naše malo misto).
- George Cheroke, 65, American football player (Cleveland Browns).
- Dele Giwa, 39, Nigerian journalist, founder of Newswatch magazine, assassinated.
- Leon Henderson, 91, American economist, administrator of the Office of Price Administration.
- Stanley Lebowsky, 59, American composer and conductor (Chicago, Jesus Christ Superstar).
- Oldřich Lipský, 62, Czech film director and screenwriter.
- Samora Machel, 53, Mozambican politician, president of Mozambique, plane crash.
- Simon Mahon, 72, British politician, Member of Parliament.
- H. Freeman Matthews, 87, American diplomat, ambassador to Austria, The Netherlands and Sweden.
- Lawrence McKillip, 62, American Olympic bobsledder (1956, 1964).
- Peter McLean, 61, Australian rugby league footballer.
- Shafeek Nader, 60, co-founder of Northwestern Connecticut Community College, brother of Ralph Nader, heart failure.
- Kottarakkara Sreedharan Nair, 64, Indian Malayalam actor (Chemmeen).
- George Pipgras, 86, American Major League baseball player (New York Yankees) and umpire.
- Joe Ryan, 69, Australian rules footballer.
- Arseny Sokolov, 76, Soviet theoretical physicist (synchrotron radiation).
- May Wilson, 80–81, American artist, pneumonia.

=== 20 ===
- Luciano Agnolín, 70, Argentine footballer.
- Michael Joe Costello, 82, Irish military leader (Irish War of Independence).
- Anton Krammer, 57, Austrian Olympic footballer (1952).
- Alain Moineau, 58, French Olympic cyclist (1948).
- George Tuttle, 81, American NFL player (Green Bay Packers), and politician.
- Tadao Uesako, 65. Japanese Olympic gymnast (1952).
- Hugh Vaughan-Thomas, 76, Welsh cricketer.
- Tommy Walker, 63, American event director, composer of "Charge!", complications of heart surgery.

=== 21 ===
- Theodor Busse, 88, Nazi German army General of the Infantry).
- Pelagio Cruz, 74, Filipino military general, chief of staff of the Armed Forces of the Philippines.
- Gisela Fackeldey, 65, German actress.
- Gadabout Gaddis, 90, American fisherman and television presenter (The Flying Fisherman).
- Fritz Hochwälder, 75, Austrian playwright.
- T. Krishna, 36, Indian Telugu film director and screenwriter (Pratighatana, Repati Pourulu).
- Lionel Murphy, 64, Australian politician and judge, Attorney-General of Australia, justice of the High Court of Australia, cancer.
- Betsy Muus, 95, Belgian sculptor.
- Edwin Albert Robson, 81, American jurist.
- George Taylor, 76, English cricketer.
- Vittorio Tracuzzi, 63, Italian Olympic basketball player (1948).
- Diwakarla Venkatavadhani, 75, Indian Telugu writer.
- Kas Vidruk 61, Canadian CFL player.

=== 22 ===
- Jane Dornacker, 39, American rock musician, comedian and traffic reporter (Leila and the Snakes), helicopter crash.
- Ivor Francis, 67, Canadian-American actor (Room 222).
- Bhagwanti Navani, 46, Indian Sindhi singer and actress.
- Albert Szent-Györgyi, 93, Hungarian biochemist and politician (Vitamin C), Nobel laureate (Physiology or Medicine).
- Wayland Hand, 79, American folklorist.
- Reg Humphries, 75, Australian rules footballer.
- Jesse Pike, 96, American Olympic cyclist (1912).
- Sven Strömberg, 75, Swedish Olympic sprinter (1936).
- Thorgeir Stubø, 42, Norwegian jazz guitarist and composer.
- Jenny Toitgans, 81, Belgian Olympic discus thrower (1928).
- Bernard Joseph Topel, 83, American Roman Catholic prelate, Bishop of Spokane.
- Ye Jianying, 89, Chinese politician and army general.

=== 23 ===
- Paul Brophy, 49, American firefighter, condition sparked right to die debate, dehydration.
- Johnny Dell Isola, 74, American NFL player (New York Giants).
- Edward Adelbert Doisy, 92, American biochemist, 1943 Nobel Prize Laureate.
- Esquerita, 48–51, American singer, songwriter and pianist, AIDS.
- Ivor D. Fenton, 97, American politician, member of the United States House of Representatives (1939-1963).
- Paul Gehrman, 74, American Major League Baseball player (Cincinnati Reds).
- Ronald Long, 75, English-American actor (Love of Life), heart faailure.
- Conrad O'Brien-ffrench, 92, British intelligence officer (MI6) and mountaineer.

=== 24 ===
- John R. Allan, 80, Scottish author and journalist.
- Hugh Craig Atkinson, 52, American librarian.
- Michael Brennan, 90, Irish general, Chief of Staff of the Irish Defence Forces.
- Johnny Dyani, 40, South African jazz double bassist, vocalist and pianist (The Blue Notes), liver ailment.
- František Janda, 76, Czech Olympic wrestler (1936).
- Joseph B. Johnson, 93, Swedish-born American politician, Governor of Vermont.
- Enrique Margall, 42, Spanish Olympic basketball player (1968, 1972).
- Henry Osmond-Clarke, 83, British surgeon.

=== 25 ===
- Larry Beil, 63, American NFL footballer (New York Giants).
- Elizabeth H. Brödel, 83, American medical illustrator.
- Carroll A. Edson, 94, American scouting leader, co-founded Order of the Arrow.
- Guillermo Eizaguirre, 77, Spanish international footballer (Sevilla, Spain).
- Ricardo Sanz García, 87, Spanish militant, leader of the Confederación Nacional del Trabajo.
- Jack Hartigan, 58, Australian rules footballer.
- Anthony Hill, 85, English cricketer.
- Howard S. McDonald, 92, American academic administrator, president of the California State University.
- Władysław Soporek, 57, Polish footballer and manager.
- Tadao Tannaka, 77, Japanese mathematician (Tannaka–Krein duality).
- Forrest Tucker, 67, American actor (F Troop), lung cancer.

=== 26 ===
- Arne Andersen, 86, Norwegian football player and Olympian (1920).
- Hüseyin Çakıroğlu, 29, Turkish footballer.
- Ed Holley, 87, American Major League baseball player.
- Jackson Scholz, 89, American sprinter and Olympic gold medalist.
- Marcel Simon, 79, French religious historian (Verus Israel).

=== 27 ===
- Sherman Adams, 87, American politician, Governor of New Hampshire, member of U.S. House of Representatives.
- Alan Branscombe, 50, English jazz pianist and alto saxophonist.
- Alexandra Cordes, 50, German writer.
- Bob Ingamells, 72, Australian politician, member of the Tasmanian House of Assembly (1959-1976).
- Albert Maes, 80, Belgian Olympic weightlifter (1924, 1928).
- Carl-Enock Svensson, 91, Swedish Olympic athlete (1920).
- Geoff Willis, 65, Australian rules footballer.

=== 28 ===
- Robert Arthur, 76, American film producer and screenwriter (Francis the Talking Mule).
- Julien Joseph Audette, 72, Canadian aviator.
- Afzal Bangash, 62, Pakistani politician and activist.
- Sidney Bollon, 86, English cricketer.
- John Braine, 64, English novelist (Room at the Top), gastric haemorrhage.
- Richard Elton Goodwin, 79, British army officer.
- Marga Klompé, 74, Dutch politician, member of the House of Representatives.
- Adelaide Lawson, 97, American artist.
- Ian Marter, 42, English actor (Doctor Who) and writer, heart attack.
- Emil Moeller, 84, Canadian politician, member of the Legislative Assembly of Manitoba (1962-1966).
- Eddie Waring, 76, British rugby league commentator, dementia.
- René Weissmann, 56, French Olympic boxer (1952).

=== 29 ===
- Gottfried Eichelbrönner, 84, German farmer and politician, member of the Landtag of Bavaria (1946-1962).
- Mimis Fotopoulos, 73, Greek actor and writer, heart attack.
- Marcel Gascoin, 79, French furniture designer.
- Maurice Leblanc-Smith, 90, British WW1 flying ace.
- Arturo Medina, 88, Chilean Olympic athlete (1920).
- Abel Meeropol, 83, American songwriter and poet ("Strange Fruit").
- Aaron Resnick, 71, American architect, co-founder of Usonia Historic District, heart attack.
- Ronald Thom, 63, Canadian architect (Massey College).
- Harry Voigt, 73, German Olympic athlete (1936).

=== 30 ===
- Reginald Keller, 92, English cricketer and British Army officer.
- Otto Knefler, 63, German footballer and manager.
- Andrzej Markowski, 62, Polish composer and conductor, founder of Wratislavia Cantans festival.
- Tandiono Manu, 73, Indonesian politician, Minister of Agriculture.
- Elisabeth Schwarzhaupt, 85, German politician, Federal Minister of Health.
- Frank Spillane, 83, Australian rugby league footballer.

=== 31 ===
- Harry Askew, 68, British Olympic long jumper (1948).
- John Blackinger, 81, American football executive (San Francisco 49ers) and politician.
- Olaf Hansen, 80, Norwegian Olympic boxer (1924).
- Bob Hardisty, 64, English footballer (Great Britain Olympic football team).
- Marcella Martin, 70, American actress (Gone with the Wind).
- Robert S. Mulliken, 90, American physicist and chemist (molecular orbital theory), Nobel laureate (Chemistry), heart failure.
- Bruno Snell, 90, German classical philologist (Die Entdeckung des Geistes).
- Félicien Vervaecke, 79, Belgian cyclist.
- Gregorio F. Zaide, 79, Filipino historian, president of the Philippine Historical Association.
