= Athletics at the 1920 Summer Olympics – Men's pentathlon =

Men's pentathlon at the Games of the VII Olympiad
- Venue: Olympisch Stadion
- Date: August 16, 1920
- Competitors: 19 from 8 nations

Medalists
1st place, gold medalist(s)		Eero Lehtonen	Finland
2nd place, silver medalist(s)		Everett Bradley	United States
3rd place, bronze medalist(s)		Hugo Lahtinen	Finland

The men's pentathlon was a track and field athletics event held as part of the Athletics at the 1920 Summer Olympics programme. It was the second time the event was held.

== Results ==
=== Long jump ===
Event 1
Place	Athlete	Distance	Score
1	Brutus Hamilton (USA)	6.86	1
2	Eero Lehtonen (FIN)	6.635	2
3	Everett Bradley (USA)	6.61	3
4	Hugo Lahtinen (FIN)	6.59	4
5	Robert LeGendre (USA)	6.505	5
6	Axel-Erik Gyllenstolpe (SWE)	6.415	6
7	Helge Løvland (NOR)	6.32	7
8	Bertil Ohlson (SWE)	6.29	8
9	Ossian Nylund (FIN)	6.285	9
10	Aleksander Klumberg (EST)	6.25	10
11	Edmond Médécin (MON)	6.21	11
12	Evert Nilsson (SWE)	6.20	12
13	Ole Reistad (NOR)	6.095	13
14	Carl-Enock Svensson (SWE)	5.895	14
15	Konstantinos Roubesis (GRE)	5.89	15
16	Jonni Myyrä (FIN)	5.80	16
17	Dimitrios Andromidas (GRE)	5.655	17
18	Robert Dunne (USA)	5.595	18
19	Hiroshi Masuda (JPN)	4.51	19

=== Javelin throw ===
Event 2
Place	Athlete	Distance	Score
1	Aleksander Klumberg (EST)	60.76	1
2	Eero Lehtonen (FIN)	54.67	2
3	Hugo Lahtinen (FIN)	54.25	3
4	Helge Løvland (NOR)	53.13	4
5	Evert Nilsson (SWE)	50.85	5
6	Carl-Enock Svensson (SWE)	50.43	6
7	Axel-Erik Gyllenstolpe (SWE)	49.88	7
8	Everett Bradley (USA)	49.16	8
9	Ossian Nylund (FIN)	48.65	9
10	Brutus Hamilton (USA)	48.36	10
11	Robert LeGendre (USA)	44.6	11
12	Bertil Ohlson (SWE)	43.68	12
13	Robert Dunne (USA)	41.52	13
14	Hiroshi Masuda (JPN)	39.82	14
15	Ole Reistad (NOR)	38.99	15
16	Edmond Médécin (MON)	31.37	16
17	Konstantinos Roubesis (GRE)	30.25	17
18	Dimitrios Andromidas (GRE)	24.11	18
—	Jonni Myyrä (FIN)	DNS	—

After 2 events
Place	Athlete	1	2	Total
1	Eero Lehtonen (FIN)	2	2	4
2	Hugo Lahtinen (FIN)	4	3	7
3	Aleksander Klumberg (EST)	10	1	11
3	Helge Løvland (NOR)	7	4	11
3	Everett Bradley (USA)	3	8	11
3	Brutus Hamilton (USA)	1	10	11
7	Axel-Erik Gyllenstolpe (SWE)	6	7	13
8	Robert LeGendre (USA)	5	11	16
9	Evert Nilsson (SWE)	12	5	17
10	Ossian Nylund (FIN)	9	9	18
11	Carl-Enock Svensson (SWE)	14	6	20
11	Bertil Ohlson (SWE)	8	12	20
13	Edmond Médécin (MON)	11	16	27
14	Ole Reistad (NOR)	13	15	28
15	Robert Dunne (USA)	18	13	31
16	Konstantinos Roubesis (GRE)	15	17	32
17	Hiroshi Masuda (JPN)	19	14	33
18	Dimitrios Andromidas (GRE)	17	18	35
19	Jonni Myyrä (FIN)	16	—	DNF-1 (16)

=== 200 metres ===
Event 3
Place	Athlete	Time	Score
1	Eero Lehtonen (FIN)	23.0	1
1	Everett Bradley (USA)	23.0	1
1	Robert LeGendre (USA)	23.0	1
4	Brutus Hamilton (USA)	23.4	4
5	Hugo Lahtinen (FIN)	23.6	5
5	Bertil Ohlson (SWE)	23.6	5
7	Carl-Enock Svensson (SWE)	23.8	7
7	Robert Dunne (USA)	23.8	7
9	Ole Reistad (NOR)	23.9	9
10	Helge Løvland (NOR)	24.0	10
10	Edmond Médécin (MON)	24.0	10
12	Axel-Erik Gyllenstolpe (SWE)	24.2	12
12	Evert Nilsson (SWE)	24.2	12
14	Ossian Nylund (FIN)	25.2	14
15	Aleksander Klumberg (EST)	25.3	15
16	Konstantinos Roubesis (GRE)	25.8	16
17	Dimitrios Andromidas (GRE)	29.0	17
—	Hiroshi Masuda (JPN)	DNS	—
—	Jonni Myyrä (FIN)	DNS	—

After 3 events
Place	Athlete	1	2	3	Total
1	Eero Lehtonen (FIN)	2	2	1	5
2	Everett Bradley (USA)	3	8	1	12
2	Hugo Lahtinen (FIN)	4	3	5	12
4	Brutus Hamilton (USA)	1	10	4	15
5	Robert LeGendre (USA)	5	11	1	17
6	Helge Løvland (NOR)	7	4	10	21
7	Bertil Ohlson (SWE)	8	12	5	25
7	Axel-Erik Gyllenstolpe (SWE)	6	7	12	25
9	Aleksander Klumberg (EST)	10	1	15	26
10	Carl-Enock Svensson (SWE)	14	6	7	27
11	Evert Nilsson (SWE)	12	5	12	29
12	Ossian Nylund (FIN)	9	9	14	32
13	Ole Reistad (NOR)	13	15	9	37
13	Edmond Médécin (MON)	11	16	10	37
15	Robert Dunne (USA)	18	13	7	38
16	Konstantinos Roubesis (GRE)	15	17	16	48
17	Dimitrios Andromidas (GRE)	17	18	17	52
18	Hiroshi Masuda (JPN)	19	14	—	DNF-2 (33)
19	Jonni Myyrä (FIN)	16	—	—	DNF-1 (16)

=== Discus throw ===
Event 4
Place	Athlete	Distance	Score
1	Bertil Ohlson (SWE)	39.80	1
2	Helge Løvland (NOR)	39.51	2
3	Aleksander Klumberg (EST)	38.62	3
4	Robert LeGendre (USA)	37.39	4
5	Brutus Hamilton (USA)	37.13	5
6	Everett Bradley (USA)	36.78	6
7	Eero Lehtonen (FIN)	34.64	7
8	Evert Nilsson (SWE)	34.62	8
9	Robert Dunne (USA)	34.28	9
10	Axel-Erik Gyllenstolpe (SWE)	33.50	10
11	Carl-Enock Svensson (SWE)	32.15	11
12	Ole Reistad (NOR)	31.98	12
13	Hugo Lahtinen (FIN)	31.12	13
14	Edmond Médécin (MON)	30.00	14
15	Ossian Nylund (FIN)	26.97	15
—	Konstantinos Roubesis (GRE)	DNS	—
—	Dimitrios Andromidas (GRE)	DNS	—
—	Hiroshi Masuda (JPN)	DNS	—
—	Jonni Myyrä (FIN)	DNS	—

After 4 events
Place	Athlete	1	2	3	4	Total
1	Eero Lehtonen (FIN)	2	2	1	7	12
2	Everett Bradley (USA)	3	8	1	6	18
3	Brutus Hamilton (USA)	1	10	4	5	20
4	Robert LeGendre (USA)	5	11	1	4	21
5	Helge Løvland (NOR)	7	4	10	2	23
6	Hugo Lahtinen (FIN)	4	3	5	13	25
7	Bertil Ohlson (SWE)	8	12	5	1	26
8	Aleksander Klumberg (EST)	10	1	15	3	29
9	Axel-Erik Gyllenstolpe (SWE)	6	7	12	10	35
10	Evert Nilsson (SWE)	12	5	12	8	37
11	Carl-Enock Svensson (SWE)	14	6	7	11	38
12	Robert Dunne (USA)	18	13	7	9	47
12	Ossian Nylund (FIN)	9	9	14	15	47
14	Ole Reistad (NOR)	13	15	9	12	49
15	Edmond Médécin (MON)	11	16	10	14	51
16	Konstantinos Roubesis (GRE)	15	17	16	—	DNF-3 (48)
17	Dimitrios Andromidas (GRE)	17	18	17	—	DNF-3 (52)
18	Hiroshi Masuda (JPN)	19	14	—	—	DNF-2 (33)
19	Jonni Myyrä (FIN)	16	—	—	—	DNF-1 (16)

=== 1500 metres ===
Event 5
Place	Athlete	Time	Score
1	Hugo Lahtinen (FIN)	4:36.0	1
2	Eero Lehtonen (FIN)	4:40.2	2
3	Bertil Ohlson (SWE)	4:42.8	3
4	Helge Løvland (NOR)	4:45.8	4
5	Robert LeGendre (USA)	4:46.0	5
6	Everett Bradley (USA)	5:10.0	6
7	Brutus Hamilton (USA)	5:12.8	7
—	Aleksander Klumberg (EST)	DNS	—
—	Axel-Erik Gyllenstolpe (SWE)	DNS	—
—	Evert Nilsson (SWE)	DNS	—
—	Carl-Enock Svensson (SWE)	DNS	—
—	Robert Dunne (USA)	DNS	—
—	Ossian Nylund (FIN)	DNS	—
—	Ole Reistad (NOR)	DNS	—
—	Edmond Médécin (MON)	DNS	—
—	Konstantinos Roubesis (GRE)	DNS	—
—	Dimitrios Andromidas (GRE)	DNS	—
—	Hiroshi Masuda (JPN)	DNS	—
—	Jonni Myyrä (FIN)	DNS	—

Final standings
Place	Athlete	1	2	3	4	5	Total
1	Eero Lehtonen (FIN)	2	2	1	7	2	14
2	Everett Bradley (USA)	3	8	1	6	6	24
3	Hugo Lahtinen (FIN)	4	3	5	13	1	26
4	Robert LeGendre (USA)	5	11	1	4	5	26
5	Helge Løvland (NOR)	7	4	10	2	4	27
6	Brutus Hamilton (USA)	1	10	4	5	7	27
7	Bertil Ohlson (SWE)	8	12	5	1	3	29
8	Aleksander Klumberg (EST)	10	1	15	3	100	DNF-4 (29)
9	Axel-Erik Gyllenstolpe (SWE)	6	7	12	10	100	DNF-4 (35)
10	Evert Nilsson (SWE)	12	5	12	8	100	DNF-4 (37)
11	Carl-Enock Svensson (SWE)	14	6	7	11	100	DNF-4 (38)
12	Robert Dunne (USA)	18	13	7	9	100	DNF-4 (47)
12	Ossian Nylund (FIN)	9	9	14	15	100	DNF-4 (47)
14	Ole Reistad (NOR)	13	15	9	12	100	DNF-4 (49)
15	Edmond Médécin (MON)	11	16	10	14	100	DNF-4 (51)
16	Konstantinos Roubesis (GRE)	15	17	16	100	100	DNF-3 (48)
17	Dimitrios Andromidas (GRE)	17	18	17	100	100	DNF-3 (52)
18	Hiroshi Masuda (JPN)	19	14	100	100	100	DNF-2 (33)
19	Jonni Myyrä (FIN)	16	100	100	100	100	DNF-1 (16)

== Sources ==
- Belgium Olympic Committee (1957). Olympic Games Antwerp 1920: Official Report (in French).
- Wudarski, Pawel (1999). "Wyniki Igrzysk Olimpijskich" (in Polish).
