= Combined events at the Olympics =

Athletics events at the Olympics with scores based on multiple events

Combined events at the Olympic Games
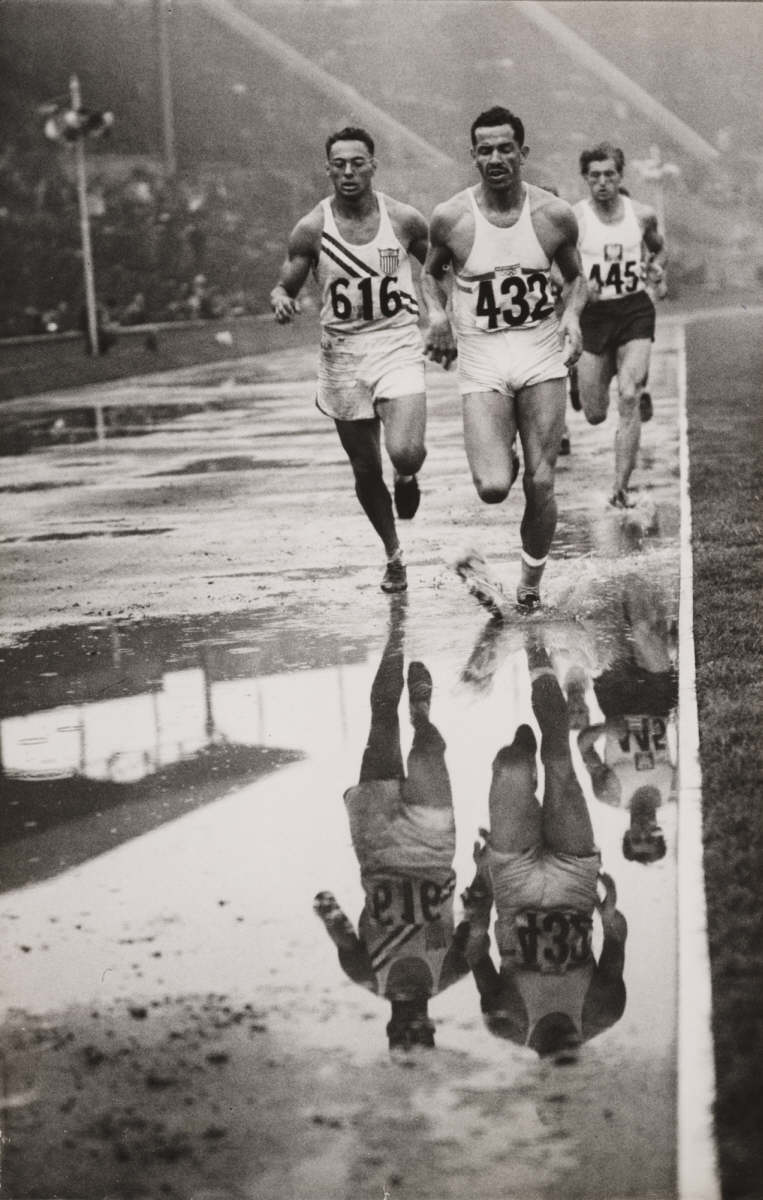
- Men competing in the 1500 m of the 1948 Olympic decathlon

Overview
- Sport: Athletics
- Gender: Men and women
- Years held: Men's decathlon: 1912 – 2024; Women's heptathlon: 1984 – 2024; Women's pentathlon: 1964 – 1980

Olympic record
- Men: 9018 pts Damian Warner (2020)
- Women: 7291 pts Jackie Joyner-Kersee (1988)

Reigning champion
- Men: Markus Rooth (NOR)
- Women: Nafissatou Thiam (BEL)

Combined events at the Summer Olympics have been contested in several formats at the multi-sport event. There are two combined track and field events in the current Olympic athletics programme: a men's decathlon (100 metres, long jump, shot put, high jump, 400 metres, 110 metres hurdles, discus throw, pole vault, javelin throw, and 1500 metres) and a women's heptathlon (100 metres hurdles, high jump, shot put, 200 metres, long jump, javelin throw, and 800 metres).

The first men's events came at the 1904 Summer Olympics: a triathlon had long jump, shot put, and 100-yard dash events, while an all-around championship saw athletes compete over ten events, forming the basis for the decathlon. No combined events were held at the subsequent games, but the 1912 Summer Olympics saw the introduction of the modern decathlon event and also a men's pentathlon (which lasted for three games). The first women's event came in 1964 in the form of the women's pentathlon. This was amended to include two more events, becoming the heptathlon at the 1984 Summer Olympics, reflecting the development of women's sport.

The Olympic record in the decathlon is 9018 points, set by Canadian athlete Damian Warner in 2021. Jackie Joyner-Kersee's score of 7291 points to win in 1988 is both the current Olympic and world record for the heptathlon – this remains the only occasion that record has been broken at the Olympics. The men's decathlon world record has had a strong link with the competition, with the Olympic gold medalist breaking the world record in 1928, 1932, 1936, 1952, 1972, 1976, and 1984.

Five men have won two Olympic combined event titles. Bob Mathias, Daley Thompson and Ashton Eaton have all won back-to-back decathlon titles, Jim Thorpe won both the decathlon and pentathlon titles in 1912, and Eero Lehtonen won two Olympic pentathlon titles. Nafissatou Thiam is the most successful athlete, having won three Olympic heptathlon titles, she is, alongside Jackie Joyner-Kersee, the only one with three Olympic combined events medals.

In 1912, Thorpe was designated the "World's Greatest Athlete" by Gustav V of Sweden and this title is traditionally given to the reigning Olympic decathlon champion in the media. Thorpe's two gold medals were stripped in 1913 on the grounds that he had broken amateurism rules (having taken expense money for playing baseball), but the International Olympic Committee restored him as the champion in 1982, 30 years after his death, admitting that the protest against Thorpe’s eligibility was not brought within the required 30 days (other medalists were not demoted).

The 1906 Intercalated Games, now not considered an official Olympic event, featured an event based on the Ancient Olympic pentathlon, combining four track and field events with a wrestling match.

== Medal summary ==
=== Men's decathlon ===
Games	Gold	Silver	Bronze
1912 Stockholm	Jim Thorpe; United States	Hugo Wieslander; Sweden; Charles Lomberg; Sweden	Gösta Holmér; Sweden
1920 Antwerp	Helge Løvland; Norway	Brutus Hamilton; United States	Bertil Ohlson; Sweden
1924 Paris	Harold Osborn; United States	Emerson Norton; United States	Aleksander Klumberg; Estonia
1928 Amsterdam	Paavo Yrjölä; Finland	Akilles Järvinen; Finland	Ken Doherty; United States
1932 Los Angeles	Jim Bausch; United States	Akilles Järvinen; Finland	Wolrad Eberle; Germany
1936 Berlin	Glenn Morris; United States	Bob Clark; United States	Jack Parker; United States
1948 London	Bob Mathias; United States	Ignace Heinrich; France	Floyd Simmons; United States
1952 Helsinki	Bob Mathias; United States	Milt Campbell; United States	Floyd Simmons; United States
1956 Melbourne	Milt Campbell; United States	Rafer Johnson; United States	Vasili Kuznetsov; Soviet Union
1960 Rome	Rafer Johnson; United States	Yang Chuan-kwang; Formosa	Vasili Kuznetsov; Soviet Union
1964 Tokyo	Willi Holdorf; United Team of Germany	Rein Aun; Soviet Union	Hans-Joachim Walde; United Team of Germany
1968 Mexico City	Bill Toomey; United States	Hans-Joachim Walde; West Germany	Kurt Bendlin; West Germany
1972 Munich	Mykola Avilov; Soviet Union	Leonid Lytvynenko; Soviet Union	Ryszard Katus; Poland
1976 Montreal	Bruce Jenner (Note: Jenner is now known as Caitlyn due to gender transition in 2015.); United States	Guido Kratschmer; West Germany	Mykola Avilov; Soviet Union
1980 Moscow	Daley Thompson; Great Britain	Yuriy Kutsenko; Soviet Union	Sergei Zhelanov; Soviet Union
1984 Los Angeles	Daley Thompson; Great Britain	Jürgen Hingsen; West Germany	Siegfried Wentz; West Germany
1988 Seoul	Christian Schenk; East Germany	Torsten Voss; East Germany	Dave Steen; Canada
1992 Barcelona	Robert Změlík; Czechoslovakia	Antonio Peñalver; Spain	Dave Johnson; United States
1996 Atlanta	Dan O'Brien; United States	Frank Busemann; Germany	Tomáš Dvořák; Czech Republic
2000 Sydney	Erki Nool; Estonia	Roman Šebrle; Czech Republic	Chris Huffins; United States
2004 Athens	Roman Šebrle; Czech Republic	Bryan Clay; United States	Dmitriy Karpov; Kazakhstan
2008 Beijing	Bryan Clay; United States	Andrei Krauchanka; Belarus	Leonel Suárez; Cuba
2012 London	Ashton Eaton; United States	Trey Hardee; United States	Leonel Suárez; Cuba
2016 Rio De Janeiro	Ashton Eaton; United States	Kevin Mayer; France	Damian Warner; Canada
2020 Tokyo	Damian Warner; Canada	Kevin Mayer; France	Ashley Moloney; Australia
2024 Paris	Markus Rooth; Norway	Leo Neugebauer; Germany	Lindon Victor; Grenada
2028 Los Angeles			

==== Multiple medalists ====
Rank	Athlete	Nation	Olympics	Gold	Silver	Bronze	Total
1=	Bob Mathias	United States	1948–1952	2	0	0	2
1=	Daley Thompson	Great Britain	1980–1984	2	0	0	2
1=	Ashton Eaton	United States	2008–2016	2	0	0	2
4=	Milt Campbell	United States	1952–1956	1	1	0	2
4=	Rafer Johnson	United States	1956–1960	1	1	0	2
4=	Roman Šebrle	Czech Republic	2000–2004	1	1	0	2
4=	Bryan Clay	United States	2004–2008	1	1	0	2
8=	Mykola Avilov	Soviet Union	1972–1976	1	0	1	2
8=	Damian Warner	Canada	2016–2020	1	0	1	2
10=	Akilles Järvinen	Finland	1928–1932	0	2	0	2
10=	Kevin Mayer	France	2016–2020	0	2	0	2
12	Hans-Joachim Walde	West Germany; United Team of Germany	1964–1968	0	1	1	2
13=	Floyd Simmons	United States	1948–1952	0	0	2	2
13=	Vasili Kuznetsov	Soviet Union	1956–1960	0	0	2	2
13=	Leonel Suárez	Cuba	2008–2012	0	0	2	2

==== Medals by country ====
Rank	Nation	Gold	Silver	Bronze	Total
1	United States	14	8	7	29
2=	Great Britain	2	0	0	2
2=	Norway	2	0	0	2
4	Soviet Union	1	3	4	8
5	Germany^{[nb]}	1	2	2	5
6	Finland	1	2	0	3
7	Sweden	1	1	2	4
8	Czech Republic	1	1	1	3
9	East Germany	1	1	0	2
10	Canada	1	0	2	3
11	Estonia	1	0	1	2
12	Czechoslovakia	1	0	0	1
13	West Germany	0	3	2	5
14	France	0	3	0	3
15=	Belarus	0	1	0	1
15=	Chinese Taipei	0	1	0	1
15=	Spain	0	1	0	1
18	Cuba	0	0	2	2
19=	Kazakhstan	0	0	1	1
19=	Poland	0	0	1	1
19=	Australia	0	0	1	1
19=	Grenada	0	0	1	1

- ^{nb} The German total includes teams both competing as Germany and the United Team of Germany, but not East or West Germany.

=== Women's heptathlon ===
Games	Gold	Silver	Bronze
1984 Los Angeles	Glynis Nunn; Australia	Jackie Joyner; United States	Sabine Everts; West Germany
1988 Seoul	Jackie Joyner-Kersee; United States	Sabine John; East Germany	Anke Behmer; East Germany
1992 Barcelona	Jackie Joyner-Kersee; United States	Irina Belova; Unified Team	Sabine Braun; Germany
1996 Atlanta	Ghada Shouaa; Syria	Natallia Sazanovich; Belarus	Denise Lewis; Great Britain
2000 Sydney	Denise Lewis; Great Britain	Yelena Prokhorova; Russia	Natallia Sazanovich; Belarus
2004 Athens	Carolina Klüft; Sweden	Austra Skujytė; Lithuania	Kelly Sotherton; Great Britain
2008 Beijing	Nataliya Dobrynska; Ukraine	Hyleas Fountain; United States	Kelly Sotherton; Great Britain
2012 London	Jessica Ennis; Great Britain	Lilli Schwarzkopf; Germany	Austra Skujytė; Lithuania
2016 Rio de Janeiro	Nafissatou Thiam; Belgium	Jessica Ennis-Hill; Great Britain	Brianne Theisen-Eaton; Canada
2020 Tokyo	Nafissatou Thiam; Belgium	Anouk Vetter; Netherlands	Emma Oosterwegel; Netherlands
2024 Paris	Nafissatou Thiam; Belgium	Katarina Johnson-Thompson; Great Britain	Noor Vidts; Belgium
2028 Los Angeles			

==== Multiple medalists ====
Seven women have won multiple medals in Olympic heptathlon, while an eighth achieved this feat in the earlier Olympic Pentathlon. Of these, only Jackie Joyner-Kersee and Nafissatou Thiam have won three medals. Only Nafissatou Thiam won three titles.

Rank	Athlete	Nation	Olympics	Gold	Silver	Bronze	Total
1	Nafissatou Thiam	Belgium	2016–2024	3	0	0	3
2	Jackie Joyner-Kersee	United States	1984–1992	2	1	0	3
3	Jessica Ennis	Great Britain	2012–2016	1	1	0	2
4	Denise Lewis	Great Britain	1996–2000	1	0	1	2
5=	Natallia Sazanovich	Belarus	1996–2000	0	1	1	2
5=	Austra Skujytė	Lithuania	2004–2012	0	1	1	2
7	Kelly Sotherton	Great Britain	2004–2008	0	0	2	2
(Note: Pentathlon medalist)	Burglinde Pollak	East Germany	1972–1976	0	0	2	2

==== Medals by country ====
Rank	Nation	Gold	Silver	Bronze	Total
1	Belgium	3	0	1	4
2	Great Britain	2	2	3	7
3	United States	2	2	0	4
4=	Australia	1	0	0	1
4=	Sweden	1	0	0	1
4=	Syria	1	0	0	1
4=	Ukraine	1	0	0	1
8=	Russia	0	1	1	2
8=	Belarus	0	1	1	2
8=	East Germany	0	1	1	2
8=	Germany	0	1	1	2
8=	Lithuania	0	1	1	2
8=	Netherlands	0	1	1	2
14	Unified Team	0	1	0	1
15=	Canada	0	0	1	1
15=	West Germany	0	0	1	1

== Defunct events ==
=== Men's all-around ===
Consisted of 100 yards, shot put, high jump, 880 yd walk, hammer throw, pole vault, 120 yd hurdles, weight throw, long jump and mile run.

Games	Gold	Silver	Bronze
1904 St. Louis	Tom Kiely (GBR)	Adam Gunn (USA)	Truxtun Hare (USA)

=== Men's triathlon ===
Consisted of long jump, shot put, and 100 yards.

Games	Gold	Silver	Bronze
1904 St. Louis	Max Emmerich (USA)	John Grieb (USA)	William Merz (USA)

=== Men's pentathlon ===
Consisted of long jump, javelin throw, 200 metres, discus throw, and 1500 metres. Eero Lehtonen was the most successful athlete in the event's three-edition history, winning two of the three gold medals on offer and being the only person to reach the podium twice.

Games	Gold	Silver	Bronze
1912 Stockholm	Jim Thorpe; United States	Ferdinand Bie; Norway; James Donahue; United States	Frank Lukeman; Canada
1920 Antwerp	Eero Lehtonen; Finland	Everett Bradley; United States	Hugo Lahtinen; Finland
1924 Paris	Eero Lehtonen; Finland	Elemér Somfay; Hungary	Robert LeGendre; United States

=== Women's pentathlon ===
Consisted of 100 metres hurdles, shot put, high jump, long jump, and 200 metres. In 1980, the 200 metres was replaced by the 800 metres. Burglinde Pollak, a bronze medalist in 1972 and 1976, was the only woman to win two Olympic pentathlon medals during its five-edition history.

Games	Gold	Silver	Bronze
1964 Tokyo	Irina Press; Soviet Union	Mary Rand; Great Britain	Galina Bystrova; Soviet Union
1968 Mexico City	Ingrid Becker; West Germany	Liese Prokop; Austria	Annamária Tóth; Hungary
1972 Munich	Mary Peters; Great Britain	Heide Rosendahl; West Germany	Burglinde Pollak; East Germany
1976 Montreal	Siegrun Siegl; East Germany	Christine Laser; East Germany	Burglinde Pollak; East Germany
1980 Moscow	Nadiya Tkachenko; Soviet Union	Olga Rukavishnikova; Soviet Union	Olga Kuragina; Soviet Union

== Intercalated Games ==
The 1906 Intercalated Games were held in Athens and at the time were officially recognised as part of the Olympic Games series, with the intention being to hold a games in Greece in two-year intervals between the internationally held Olympics. However, this plan never came to fruition and the International Olympic Committee (IOC) later decided not to recognise these games as part of the official Olympic series. Some sports historians continue to treat the results of these games as part of the Olympic canon.

No strictly track and field combined event featured on the programme, as happened at the 1904 Summer Olympics, but the Greeks introduced a variation of the Ancient Olympic pentathlon. This contained four track and field events – standing long jump, ancient-style discus throw, javelin throw and a stadion race (192 m) – with the final event being Greco-Roman wrestling.

American Martin Sheridan was the initial favourite, having already won gold and silver medals in individual jump and throws events, but dropped out due to injury. Lawson Robertson and István Mudin each won two of the rounds (Robertson the long jump and stadion, Mudin the discus and wrestling), but it was Sweden's Hjalmar Mellander who won the gold medal with 24 points. The Swede never finished in the top two of a round, but he performed consistently, never below seventh place in the 27-man field. Mudin of Hungary took a close second place with 25 points. Third place was taken by another Swede, Eric Lemming, who later went on to win two consecutive Olympic gold medals in the javelin throw.

Games	Gold	Silver	Bronze
1906 Athens	Hjalmar Mellander (SWE)	István Mudin (HUN)	Eric Lemming (SWE)
