= Athletics at the 1920 Summer Olympics – Men's decathlon =

Men's decathlon at the Games of the VII Olympiad
- Venue: Olympisch Stadion
- Dates: August 20–21, 1920
- Competitors: 23 from 11 nations

Medalists
1st place, gold medalist(s)		Helge Løvland	Norway
2nd place, silver medalist(s)		Brutus Hamilton	United States
3rd place, bronze medalist(s)		Bertil Ohlson	Sweden

The men's decathlon was a track and field athletics event held as part of the Athletics at the 1920 Summer Olympics programme.

== Results ==
The best score for each event is highlighted.

Final standings
Place	Athlete	1 100m	2 LJ	3 SP	4 HJ	5 400m	6 DT	7 110mH	8 PV	9 JT	10 1500m	Total
1	Helge Løvland (NOR)	668.8	676.600	585	608	751.84	886.0	700.94	595	642.775	690.4	6803.355
2	Brutus Hamilton (USA)	809.6	687.625	627	538	744.32	781.5	655.34	649	644.700	634.0	6771.085
3	Bertil Ohlson (SWE)	668.8	714.575	573	608	744.32	810.0	717.66	649	419.475	677.2	6580.030
4	Gösta Holmér (SWE)	714.4	588.400	572	678	687.92	848.0	605.18	595	632.050	611.2	6532.150
5	Evert Nilsson (SWE)	619.2	527.250	605	748	718.00	525.0	603.28	703	677.700	707.2	6433.530
6	Valdemar Wickholm (FIN)	762.0	637.400	610	538	827.04	829.0	509.42	487	498.400	707.2	6405.460
7	Eugene Vidal (USA)	668.8	639.850	582	608	718.00	800.5	699.42	649	293.800	701.2	6358.570
8	Axel-Erik Gyllenstolpe (SWE)	668.8	693.750	535	608	714.24	829.0	560.72	433	578.525	612.4	6331.435
9	Ernst Gerspach (SUI)	668.8	608.000	525	538	669.12	791.0	527.66	541	474.200	607.0	5947.780
10	Constant Bucher (SUI)	714.4	571.250	437	328	706.72	601.0	514.36	433	325.150	642.4	5273.280
11	René Joannes-Powell (BEL)	619.2	592.075	413	468	691.68	715.0	357.04	433	137.325	665.2	5091.520
12	Gensabulo Noguchi (JPN)	643.0	517.350	279	328	661.60	0.0	116.88	271	298.200	553.6	3668.630
—	Harry Goelitz (USA)	668.8	567.575	547	608	785.68	867.0	555.02	379	348.250	—	DNF
—	Einar Ræder (NOR)	668.8	675.375	565	608	718.00	810.0	374.14	217	305.350	—	DNF
—	Aleksander Klumberg (EST)	571.6	659.450	627	678	699.20	715.0	646.60	541	—	—	DNF
—	Everett Ellis (USA)	668.8	525.925	611	538	759.36	886.0	483.96	325	—	—	DNF
—	Carlo Butti (ITA)	524.0	544.300	527	468	631.52	620.0	—	—	—	—	DNF
—	Eero Lehtonen (FIN)	762.0	743.975	532	398	766.88	—	—	—	—	—	DNF
—	Eduard Hašek (TCH)	762.0	638.625	459	398	721.76	—	—	—	—	—	DNF
—	Pekka Johansson (FIN)	571.6	617.800	635	468	548.80	—	—	—	—	—	DNF
—	Apostolos Nikolaidis (GRE)	476.4	472.025	605	608	—	—	—	—	—	—	DNF
—	Dimitrios Andromidas (GRE)	524.0	490.400	458	468	—	—	—	—	—	—	DNF
—	Hugo Lahtinen (FIN)	668.8	664.350	472	0	—	—	—	—	—	—	DNF

== Sources ==
- Belgium Olympic Committee (1957). Olympic Games Antwerp 1920: Official Report (in French).
- Wudarski, Pawel (1999). "Wyniki Igrzysk Olimpijskich" (in Polish).
