= List of flag bearers for Norway at the Olympics =

Norway at the Olympics
- IOC code: NOR
- NOC: Norwegian Olympic Committee and Confederation of Sports
- Website: www.idrettsforbundet.no (in Norwegian)
- Medals: Gold 188 Silver 174 Bronze 158 Total 520

Summer appearances
- 1900; 1904; 1908; 1912; 1920; 1924; 1928; 1932; 1936; 1948; 1952; 1956; 1960; 1964; 1968; 1972; 1976; 1980; 1984; 1988; 1992; 1996; 2000; 2004; 2008; 2012; 2016; 2020; 2024

Winter appearances
- 1924; 1928; 1932; 1936; 1948; 1952; 1956; 1960; 1964; 1968; 1972; 1976; 1980; 1984; 1988; 1992; 1994; 1998; 2002; 2006; 2010; 2014; 2018; 2022; 2026

Other related appearances
- 1906 Intercalated Games

This is a list of flag bearers who have represented Norway at the Olympics.

Flag bearers carry the national flag of their country at the opening ceremony of the Olympic Games.

#	Event year	Season	Flag bearer	Sport
1	1906	Summer	Ole Tobias Olsen	Shooting
2	1908	Summer	Oskar Bye	Gymnastics
3	1920	Summer	Helge Løvland	Athletics (track and field)
4	1924	Winter	Harald Strøm	Speed skating
5	1928	Winter	Ole Reistad	Military patrol
6	1928	Summer	Ketil Askildt	Athletics (track and field)
7	1932	Winter	Johan Grøttumsbraaten	Nordic combined
8	1932	Summer	Olav Sunde	Athletics (track and field)
9	1936	Winter	Ivar Ballangrud	Speed skating
10	1936	Summer	Otto Berg	Athletics (track and field)
11	1948	Winter	Birger Ruud	Ski jumping
12	1948	Summer	Godtfred Holmvang	Athletics (track and field)
13	1952	Winter	Hjalmar Andersen	Speed skating
14	1952	Summer	Martin Stokken	Athletics (track and field)
15	1956	Winter	Sverre Stenersen	Nordic combined
16	1956	Summer	Thor Thorvaldsen	Sailing
17	1960	Winter	Knut Johannesen	Speed skating
18	1960	Summer	Sverre Strandli	Athletics (track and field)
19	1964	Winter	Knut Johannesen	Speed skating
20	1964	Summer	Harald V of Norway	Sailing
21	1968	Winter	Bjørn Wirkola	Ski jumping
22	1968	Summer	Berit Berthelsen	Athletics (track and field)
23	1972	Winter	Magnar Solberg	Biathlon
24	1972	Summer	Harald Barlie	Greco-Roman wrestling
25	1976	Winter	Pål Tyldum	Cross-country skiing
26	1976	Summer	Leif Jenssen	Weightlifting
27	1980	Winter	Jan Egil Storholt	Speed skating
28	1984	Winter	Bjørg Eva Jensen	Speed skating
29	1984	Summer	Alf Hansen	Rowing
30	1988	Winter	Oddvar Brå	Cross-country skiing
31	1988	Summer	Grete Waitz	Athletics (track and field)
32	1992	Winter	Eirik Kvalfoss	Biathlon
33	1992	Summer	Jorunn Horgen	Sailing
34	1994	Winter	Bjørn Dæhlie	Cross-country skiing
35	1996	Summer	Linda Andersen	Sailing
36	1998	Winter	Espen Bredesen	Ski jumping
37	2000	Summer	Vebjørn Rodal	Athletics (track and field)
38	2002	Winter	Liv Grete Skjelbreid-Poirée	Biathlon
39	2004	Summer	Harald Stenvaag	Shooting
40	2006	Winter	Pål Trulsen	Curling
41	2008	Summer	Ruth Kasirye	Weightlifting
42	2010	Winter	Tommy Jakobsen	Ice hockey
43	2012	Summer	Mira Verås Larsen	Canoe racing
44	2014	Winter	Aksel Lund Svindal	Alpine skiing
45	2016	Summer	Ole Kristian Bryhn	Shooting
46	2018	Winter	Emil Hegle Svendsen	Biathlon
47	2020	Summer	Tomoe Hvas	Swimming
47	2020	Summer	Anne Vilde Tuxen	Diving
48	2022	Winter	Kjetil Jansrud	Alpine skiing
48	2022	Winter	Kristin Skaslien	Curling
49	2024	Summer	Katrine Lunde	Handball
49	2024	Summer	Christian Sørum	Volleyball

== See also ==
- Norway at the Olympics
