= Peter Phelps (disambiguation) =

Peter Phelps (born 1960) is an Australian actor, singer and writer.

Peter Phelps may also refer to:

- Peter Phelps (politician) (born 1968), Australian politician
- Peter Phelps (cricketer) (1909–1986), English cricketer
- Peter Phelps (swimmer) (born 1945), Australian former swimmer
