= Pentathlon at the Olympics =

Pentathlon at the Olympics may refer to:

- Modern pentathlon at the Summer Olympics
- Athletics pentathlon at the Summer Olympics
