= Everett Bradley =

Everett Bradley may refer to:

- Everett Bradley (athlete) (1897–1969), American pentathlete and Olympic medalist
- Everett Bradley (musician), American multi-instrumentalist
