= Rolland Hein =

American academic (1932–2023)

Rolland Hein (September 12, 1932 – March 10, 2023) was an American academic of English literature. He was professor emeritus of English at Wheaton College, Wheaton, Illinois.

== Early life and education ==
Hein was born on September 12, 1932, as the son of George and Henrietta Hein. He grew up on a farm outside Cedar Rapids, Iowa. He attended Bob Jones University and graduated from Wheaton College in 1954.

While at Wheaton, Hein studied under Clyde Kilby, who was responsible for helping to secure the papers of writers C. S. Lewis and J. R. R. Tolkien for the Marion E. Wade Center at Wheaton College.

Hein earned a bachelor of divinity degree in 1957 from Grace Theological Seminary and a master's degree in English literature from Purdue University in 1962. He then earned a PhD from Purdue in 1971.

== Professional career ==
Hein began his career as a pastor at a church in Flora, Indiana. He then joined the faculty of Wheaton College in 1970. He taught courses in modern British literature and contemporary American literature. Hein was a George MacDonald scholar and author of several books, including Growing With My Garden, Christian Mythmakers, "The Harmony Within", George MacDonald: Victorian Mythmaker", and others.

Hein retired from Wheaton in 1997.

== Personal life and death ==
Hein was married to his wife Dorothy for 67 years. They had a son, Steven, and a daughter, Christine. Hein died in Carol Stream, Illinois, on March 10, 2023, at the age of 90.
