= Eduard Hašek =

Czech athlete

Eduard Hašek (15 December 1893 – 25 October 1960) was a Czechoslovak track and field athlete who competed in the 1920 Summer Olympics. In 1920 he was eliminated in the first round of the 100 metres competition. He also participated in the decathlon event, but withdrew after the fifth contest.
