= Everett Ellis =

American decathlete (1897–1973)

Personal information
- Born: January 12, 1897 Dorchester, Boston, United States
- Died: January 6, 1973 (aged 75) Salem, Missouri, United States

Sport
- Sport: Athletics
- Event: Decathlon

Everett Ellis (January 12, 1897 – January 6, 1973) was an American athlete. He competed in the men's decathlon at the 1920 Summer Olympics.
