= Dimitrios Andromedas =

Greek hurdler (1889–1929)

Personal information
- Nationality: Greek
- Born: 17 March 1889 Geraki, Greece
- Died: 17 June 1929 (aged 40) Worcester, Massachusetts, U.S.

Sport
- Sport: Track and field
- Event: 110 metres hurdles

Dimitrios Andromedas (17 March 1889 – 17 June 1929) was a Greek decathlete.

He competed in four events at the 1920 Summer Olympics. He finished seventeenth in the pentathlon and failed to finish the decathlon. He also competed in the 110 metres hurdles and the high jump without reaching the final.

Migrating to the United States before World War I, he was known as James Andromedas and settled in Lowell, Massachusetts. He was a member of the Lowell Greek-American Club and the YMCA, and coached at the Worcester Academy. He died of pneumonia at the age of 40.
