= Ossian Nylund =

Finnish triple jumper, long jumper and pentathlete

Ossian Rudolf Nylund (22 April 1894 in Helsinki – 19 December 1939) was a Finnish track and field athlete who competed in the 1920 Summer Olympics. In 1920, he finished seventh in the triple jump event. He also participated in the pentathlon competition. He was twelfth overall but did not start in the final 1500 metres run.
