= Colin Duriez =

English writer (1947–2025)

Colin Duriez (19 July 1947 – 1 November 2025) was an English writer on fantasy, especially that of the Inklings literary group centred around the Christian authors C. S. Lewis and J. R. R. Tolkien. He won the Clyde S. Kilby Award in 1994 for his research on the Inklings.

== Life and works ==
Colin Duriez was born in Derbyshire on 19 July 1947. He moved to Leicester in 1983 to work with a small publisher, IVP, as a commissioning editor. He took various teaching and editing jobs, and in 2002 he started his own business in Keswick, Cumbria, InWriting, devoted to writing, editorial services, and book acquisition for publishers.

Duriez won the Clyde S. Kilby Award in 1994 for his research on the Inklings, the literary group that included J. R. R. Tolkien and C. S. Lewis. He has been described as "the most useful scholar writing on Lewis today." He has published many books on Christian literary figures, and spoke to literary, academic and professional groups. His television documentaries include A Quest for Meaning – Myth, Imagination & Faith in the Literature of J.R.R. Tolkien & C.S. Lewis.

Duriez died from complications of Alzheimer's disease on 1 November 2025, at the age of 78. At the time of his death, Duriez lived in Wallingford, Oxfordshire with wife and fellow author Cindy Zudys, having previously lived in Keswick, Cumbria. As of February 2025, he had been due to stand trial at Leicester Crown Court, having been charged with historical child sex offences alleged to have occurred between 1989 and 1991.

== Reception ==
=== Bedeviled: Lewis, Tolkien, and the Shadow of Evil ===
Benjamin C. Parker, reviewing Duriez's Bedeviled: Lewis, Tolkien, and the Shadow of Evil, writes that the strengths of the book include its thorough connection of Lewis's writings to earlier literature on the subject, and his setting of his thesis about the Inklings in terms of 21st century events and literature. Parker finds the analysis of issues related to Christianity "profound", and states that the book is accessible both to academics and the general public, with the more scholarly details relegated to endnotes.

=== The Oxford Inklings: Lewis, Tolkien, and Their Circle ===
Courtney Petrucci, reviewing The Oxford Inklings: Lewis, Tolkien, and Their Circle, writes that the book's "great strength" is "its effective use of other Inklings' writings to give the reader a sense for what the group was like and how its most prominent members [Lewis, Tolkien, Owen Barfield, and Charles Williams] were understood" by the less-famous members. Petrucci finds the book remarkable in succeeding in balancing the coverage, offering fresh "insights and perspectives", and bringing out the complicated ideas that the Inklings discussed while telling the basic story of the group.

=== Tolkien and C. S. Lewis and The Inklings Handbook ===
John E. McKinley, in his review of the biography Tolkien and C. S. Lewis: The Gift of Friendship and The Inklings Handbook: A Comprehensive Guide to the Lives, Thought and Writings of C. S. Lewis, J. R. R. Tolkien, Charles Williams, Owen Barfield and Their Friends, writes that these are "excellent resources" for readers new to Tolkien and Lewis, and useful too to "devoted reader[s]" of their "imaginative and provocative writings". The biography is in McKinley's view unique in showing how the friendship between the two writers stimulated and inspired both of them "to write Christian mythology and apologetics". He adds that Duriez shows that both men were opposed to the "mechanization" of the modern age; both took "delight in imagination"; and both "embrace[d] historic Christianity".

== Books ==
=== Literary ===
- 1990 The C. S. Lewis Handbook (Monarch Publications/Baker Book House)
- 1992 Tolkien and Middle-earth Handbook (Monarch Publications/Baker Book House/Angus & Robertson)
- 2000 The C.S. Lewis Encyclopedia (Crossway)
- 2001 (with David Porter) The Inklings Handbook (Azure/Chalice)
- 2001 Tolkien and the Lord of the Rings: A Guide to Middle Earth (Azure/Hidden Spring)
- 2006 The Poetic Bible (compiler) (SPCK)
- 2007 The Unauthorised Harry Potter Companion (Sutton)
- 2007 A Field Guide to Harry Potter
- 2008 A Field Guide to Narnia
- 2013 The A-Z of C.S. Lewis: An Encyclopedia of His Life, Thought and Writings (Lion Hudson)
- 2015 (with Cindy Kiple) Bedeviled: Lewis, Tolkien and the Shadow of Evil (IVP Books)

=== Biography ===
- 2003 Tolkien and C.S. Lewis: The Gift of Friendship (HiddenSpring)
- 2005 The C.S. Lewis Chronicles (Darton Longman & Todd)
- 2013 C.S. Lewis, A biography of friendship (Lion Books)
- 2015 Francis Schaeffer: An Authentic Life (Crossway)
- 2015 The Oxford Inklings: Lewis, Tolkien and their Circle (Lion Books)
- 2018 J.R.R. Tolkien: The Making of a Legend (Rydon)
- 2020 Dorothy Sayers: A Biography: Deah, Dane, and Lord Peer Wimsey (Lion Hudson)

=== History ===
- 2008 AD 33: The Year That Changed the World (History Press)
