= Hiroshi Masuda =

Japanese pentathlete

Personal information
- Nationality: Japanese
- Born: 23 October 1901

Sport
- Sport: Athletics
- Event: Pentathlon

Hiroshi Masuda (born 23 October 1901, date of death unknown) was a Japanese track and field athlete. He competed in the men's pentathlon at the 1920 Summer Olympics.
