= Edmond Médécin =

Monegasque sprinter (1898–1951)

Personal information
- Nationality: Monegasque
- Born: 20 November 1898
- Died: 16 February 1951 (aged 52)

Sport
- Sport: Sprinting
- Event: 100 metres

Edmond Médécin (20 November 1898 – 16 February 1951) was a Monegasque sprinter. He competed in the men's 100 metres at the 1920 Summer Olympics.
