= Diwakarla Venkatavadhani =

Divakarla Venkatavadhani
- Born: 23 June 1911; Yendagandi
- Died: 21 October 1986; Mumbai
- Education: Ph.D.
- Occupation: Poet
- Spouse: Divakarla Chandravati
- Children: 7
- Writing career
- Language: Telugu
- Notable works: Andhra Vangmaya Charitra; Nannayya; Pothana; Sahitya Sopanamulu; Learn Telugu in 30 Days; Andhra Vyasavali
- Notable awards: Kalaprapoorna

Divakarla Venkatavadhani (23 June 1911 – 21 October 1986) was a Telugu scholar. He created a stage-worthy literary feature called Bhuvana Vijayam, a replay of a poetic tribute-cum-symposium in Krishnadevaraya's court, by Ashta diggajas.

== Life ==
Divakarla was the first poet to stage Bhuvanavijayam in Hyderabad for the first time, playing the role of Allasani Peddana in the play. Tirumala Tirupathi Devasthanam (TTD) published the sacred texts into Telugu in 1984 under Acharya Diwakarla Venkatavadhani as the chief editor. A forum called as Divakarla Vedika was formed to showcase his works.

== Works ==
He contributed to the work of translating Andhra Mahabharatam written in archaic Telugu into the current Telugu. This project was headed by Tirumala Tirupati Devasthanams.
