= George Tuttle =

American football player (1905–1986)

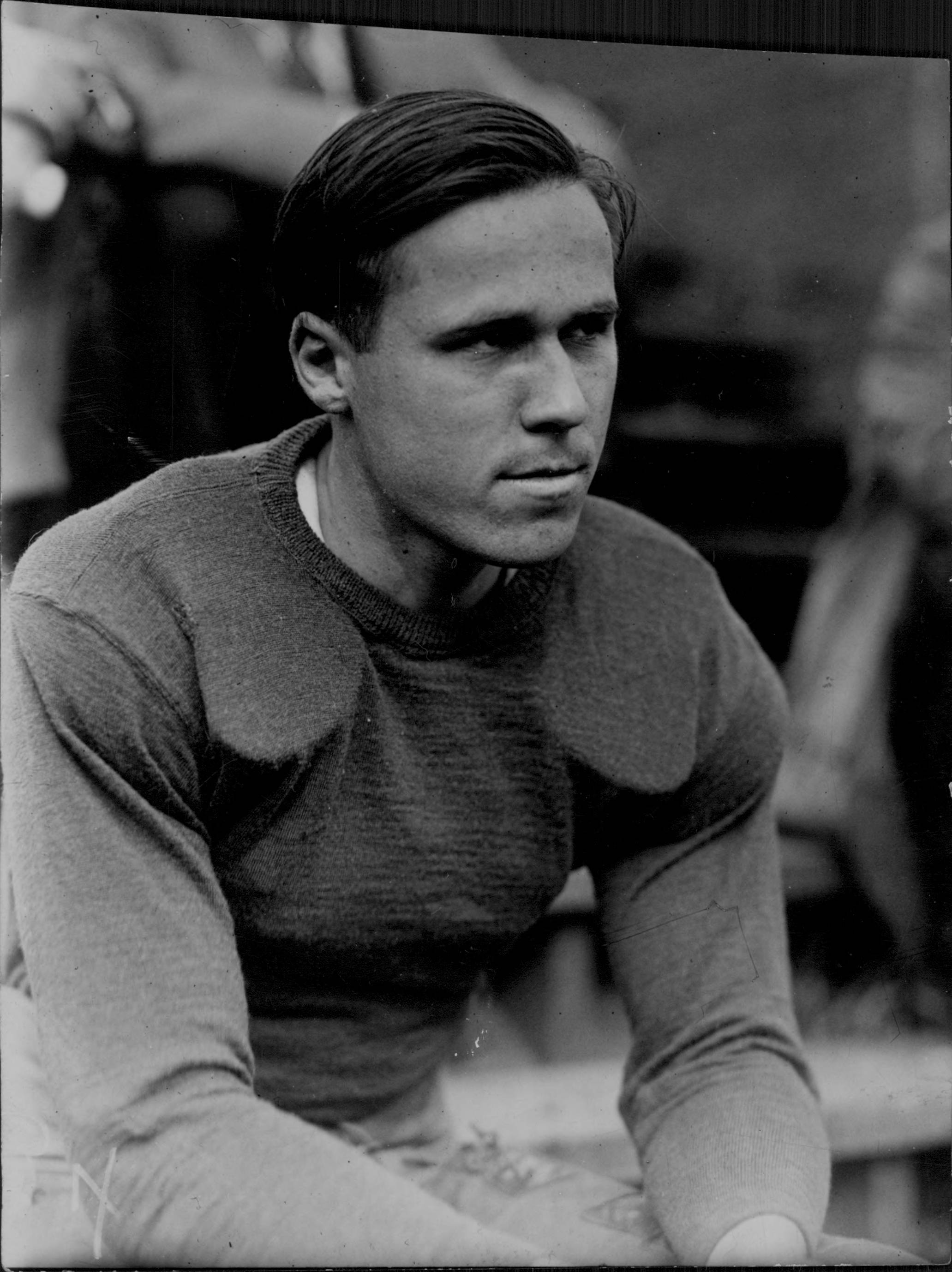

Profile
- Position: End

Personal information
- Born: January 14, 1905; Minneapolis, Minnesota, U.S.
- Died: October 20, 1986 (aged 81); Minneapolis, Minnesota, U.S.
- Listed height: 5 ft 11 in (1.80 m)
- Listed weight: 180 lb (82 kg)

Career information
- College: Minnesota

Career history
- Green Bay Packers (1927)

Career statistics
- Games played: 1
- Stats at Pro Football Reference

George Karl Tuttle (January 14, 1905 – October 20, 1986) was an American football player, politician, and bowling-alley owner.

Tuttle was born in Minneapolis in 1905 and attended South High School in that city. He attended the University of Minnesota where he played college football from 1923 to 1926.

He also played one game at the end position for the Green Bay Packers of the National Football League (NFL) during the 1927 NFL season.

After graduating from Minnesota, he was a coach at Virginia High School in Virginia, Minnesota, and at Central High School in Duluth, Minnesota.

Tuttle served as the freshman football coach at the University of Minnesota from 1930 to 1935. He also served as the state recreation director for the Works Projects Administration in the late 1930s.

He later operated bowling alleys, starting with the eight-lane Tuttle Recreation Center in Minneapolis in 1939. He later operated the Hiawatha Bowl in Minneapolis from 1956 to 1960 and the Stardust Lanes starting in 1961. From 1955 to 1969, he was also a commentator on the television program "Bowlerama".

Tuttle was elected as an alderman and served on the Minneapolis city council in the late 1940s and early 1950s. In his later years, he lived in Edina, Minnesota. He died in 1986 at age 81 at the Metropolitan Medical Center in Minneapolis.
