= Gerhard Dietrich (pedagogue) =

- Born: 26 November 1927; Aue, Saxony, Germany
- Died: 8 October 1986 (aged 58); East Berlin, East Germany
- Occupations: Pedagogue; Teacher (higher education); University Professor (Leipzig)
- Political party: KPD; SED

Gerhard Dietrich (26 November 1927 – 8 October 1986) was a leading German pedagogue and a Trades Union official.

From 1952 to 1980 he worked at what was then the Karl Marx University of Leipzig on the Structuring and Methodology of teaching Biology. Between 1980 and 1986 he was General Secretary of the Berlin based Academy of Pedagogic Sciences.

== Life ==
=== Early years ===
Gerhard Dietrich was born on 26 November, 1927. The son of a metal worker, Dietrich attended school locally at Hundshübel on the north side of the Ore Mountains that divide Saxony from Bohemia. Between 1942 and 1944 he attended the commerce focused High school at nearby Eibenstock, training for a career as a baker. He was a member of the Hitler Youth between 1941 and 1945. Dietrich was sent to perform military service in 1944/45 and spent the period May–December 1945 in an Allied internment camp (Camp 2228) in the Rhineland.

=== Career ===
In 1945–46 Dietrich was employed at a factory in Stützengrün that made brushes. In 1946 he joined the KPD (Communist party). However, the part of Germany in which he lived was in the process of being transformed into the German Democratic Republic (East Germany), a new state created under a nation-building project that had been prepared in some detail by a team that had arrived from Moscow in April–May 1945. The plans did not envisage a genuine multi-party political system, and by the end of 1946 Gerhard Dietrich was a member of the country's ruling SED (Socialist Unity Party of Germany / Sozialistische Einheitspartei Deutschlands).

There was an acute shortage of working-age people in Germany by 1945, and from 1946 till 1949 Dietrich, like many others, worked as a pre-qualified trainee teacher at a junior school. He worked during these years in Hundshübel, after which he became a full teacher, working at the middle school, now becoming involved in teacher training. In 1949 he took a teaching job at the senior school in Schneeberg.

Later in 1949 he moved to the Karl Marx University in Leipzig where for three years, till 1952, he was a student at the Pedagogy faculty. He then stayed on, between 1952 and 1956, as a research assistant. He then, still at Leipzig, took a lectureship, remaining in post till 1963. During this period he received a doctorate in Pedagogy in 1957 and further promotion in 1962. A professorship incorporating a teaching contract followed in 1963. From 1964 till 1969, still at Leipzig Gerhard Dietrich was Prorektor für wissenschaftlichen Nachwuchs ("vice-rector for young scientists") which was followed by a period from 1970 till 1976 as Director of the Pedagogy Section and head of the Teaching Methodology department.

From 1977 till 1980 Dietrich was chairman of the Arbeitsgemeinschaft Pädagogische Wissenschaft ("Association of Educational Science") and ordentlicher Professor for the Methodology of Biology Teaching. He was also chairman of the Zentrale Fachkommission Biologiemethodik des Ministeriums für Volksbildung und des Ministeriums für Hoch- und Fachschulwesen der DDR ("Central Commission on Biology Methodology of the Ministries of Peoples' Education and of Higher Education and Specialist Training in the German Democratic Republic"). On top of this, since 1970 Dietrich had been a member of the national Academy of Pedagogical Sciences (APW), and from 1980 until his death in 1986 he served as General Secretary of this institution. Finally, between 1980 and 1986 he was a member of the Central Executive Committee of the Education and Training Trades Union.

== Publications ==
- Die Sicherung der Lernergebnisse im Biologieunterricht; Berlin 1962
- Methodik Biologieunterricht; Berlin 1976
- (with Friedrich W. Stöcker) Fachlexikon ABC Biologie : ein alphabetisches Nachschlagewerk für Wissenschaftler und Naturfreunde: H. Deutsch, 1986
- (with Annelies Müller-Hegemann) Jugendlexikon Biologie; Bibliographisches Institut, 1987
