= Evert Nilsson =

Swedish decathlete

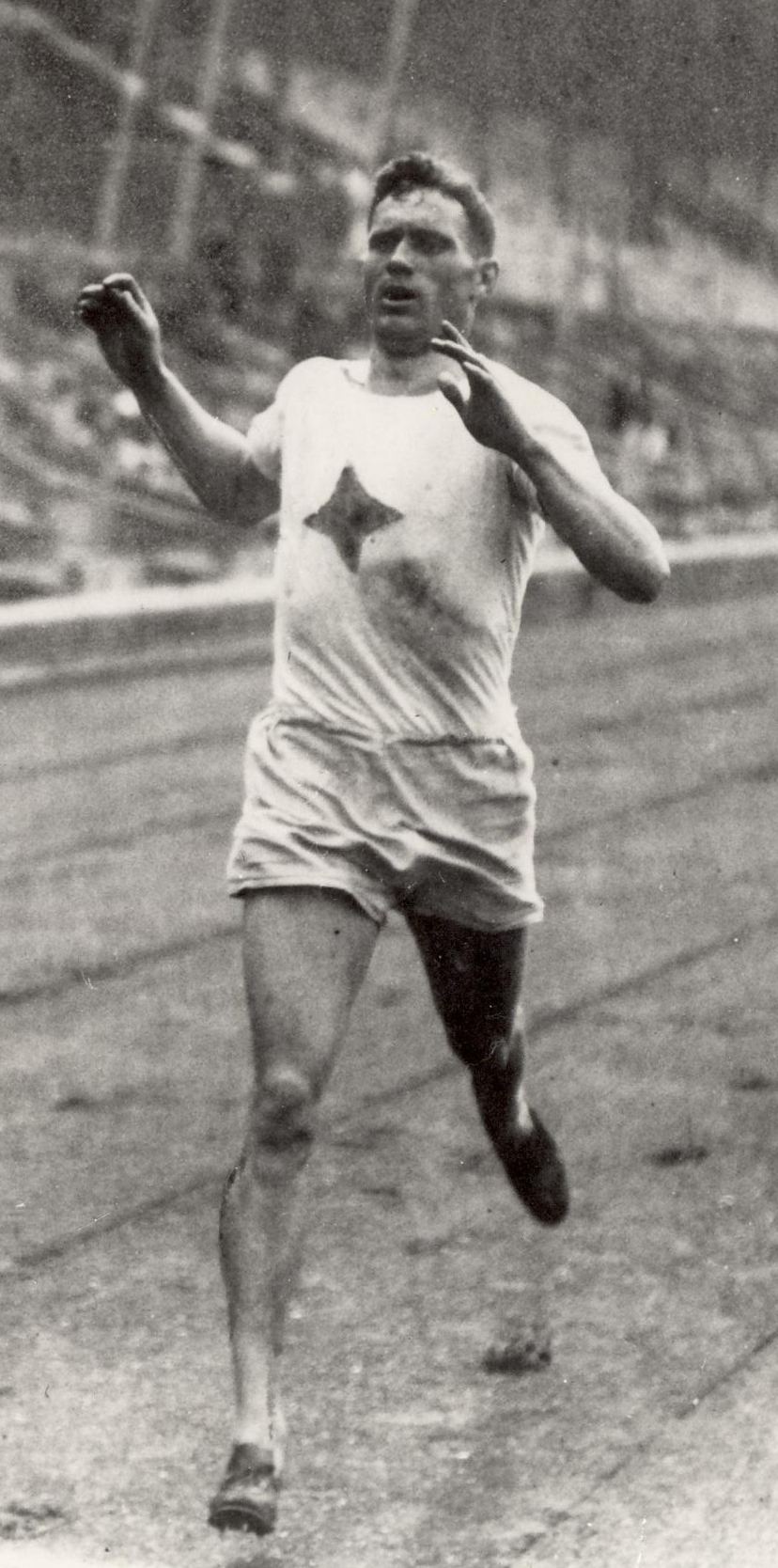

Personal information
- Born: 22 October 1894 Gamleby, Sweden
- Died: 14 February 1973 (aged 78) Vikingstad, Sweden

Sport
- Sport: Athletics
- Event(s): Pentathlon, decathlon, high jump
- Club: IFK Oskarshamn; IFK Halmstad

Achievements and titles
- Personal best(s): Dec – 6142 (1925); HJ – 1.84 m (1920)

Evert Reinhold Emanuel "Västervik" Nilsson (22 October 1894 – 14 February 1973) was a Swedish pentathlete and decathlete who competed at the 1920 and 1924 Summer Olympics. In 1920 he finished fifth in the decathlon; in the pentathlon he placed tenth, despite not running the 1500 m stage. Four years later, he withdrew from the decathlon and pentathlon competitions after the fourth contest. Nilsson was Swedish champion in the pentathlon (1921–23) and decathlon (1920, 1923, 1925 and 1926) and held national records in both events.
