= Kas Vidruk =

Profile
- Positions: Offensive lineman, Linebacker

Personal information
- Born: October 6, 1925; Šiauliai, Lithuania
- Died: October 21, 1986 (aged 61)

Career information
- College: St. Paul High School, Winnipeg

Career history
- 1942, 1945–1947: Winnipeg Blue Bombers
- 1948–1950: Montreal Alouettes
- 1951–1955: Winnipeg Blue Bombers

Awards and highlights
- Grey Cup champion (1949)

Kas Vidruk was a Grey Cup champion Canadian Football League player. He played on both offense and defence as a centre, guard, tackle and linebacker.

When only 17 years old, and just out of high school, Vidruk signed with the Winnipeg Blue Bombers in 1942 for $50 (making him perhaps the youngest player and first Lithuanian in the history of the CFL). The Bombers suspended operations in 1943 (becoming the Winnipeg RCAF Bombers) and Vidruk enlisted in the Royal Canadian Navy. Upon his return in 1945 he rejoined the Bombers. He played in the 1945 Grey Cup loss to the Toronto Argonauts.

He moved to Montreal in 1948, playing for the Montreal Alouettes and beginning studies at McGill University that would lead to his Physical Education degree. In 1949 he was an integral part of the Larks first Grey Cup championship as a replacement for all-star Eagle Keys at centre and a backup at every other line position. He played 3 seasons with Montreal, for a total of 30 games. Returning to Winnipeg, he played for 5 more seasons, including the 1953 Grey Cup.

He studied at University of Manitoba. Vidruk became deeply involved in the Winnipeg amateur sports community:

Pan Am Games Society and Faculties Board (1966-69), Manitoba Football Official Association, Canadian Football League Official, Manitoba Amateur Football Association, founding member of the Manitoba High School Athletic Association, Chairman of the Manitoba Sports Federation Boards of Directors (1978-81), Sports Federation of Canada Board Member (1982-85), Vice Chairman of the Manitoba Sports Hall of Fame (1979-85), active member of the Manitoba Waterski Association.

For all his good works, he was enshrined in the Manitoba Sports Hall of Fame in 1987. He died on October 21, 1986.
