= Helge Løvland =

Norwegian decathlete (1890–1984)

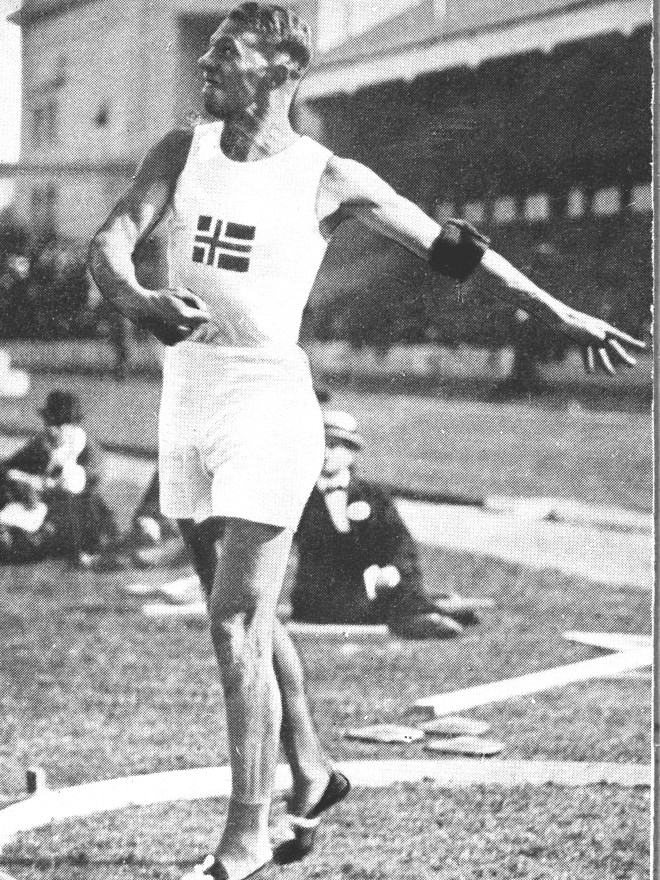
- Løvland at the 1920 Olympic Games

Personal information
- Full name: Helge Andreas Løvland
- Born: 11 May 1890 Froland, Norway
- Died: 26 April 1984 (aged 93) Oslo, Norway
- Education: Norwegian Military Academy
- Occupation: Military officer (Lieutenant colonel)
- Years active: 1913–1920 (athletics)
- Employers: Norwegian Armed Forces; Norwegian Confederation of Sports (secretary-general)
- Height: 1.88 m (6 ft 2 in)

Sport
- Events: Pentathlon, decathlon, 110 metres hurdles, long jump, discus throw, javelin throw
- Club: IF Ørnulf
Medal record
Men's athletics
Representing Norway
Olympic Games
Gold medal – first place	1920 Antwerp	Decathlon

Helge Andreas Løvland (11 May 1890 – 26 April 1984) was a Norwegian military officer, track and field athlete, sports official and writer. He won the gold medal in the decathlon at the 1920 Olympics. Løvland was awarded the Egebergs Ærespris in 1919.

== Early life and education ==
He was born in Froland Municipality as a son of forest owner Anders Løvland (1852–1928) and Helga née Lyngrot. He was a nephew of Norway's Prime Minister from 1907 to 1908, Jørgen Løvland. Helge Løvland attended Arendal Upper Secondary School, but completed the examen artium at Aars og Voss School in 1911. He resided in Kristiania until he graduated from the Norwegian Military Academy in 1914. He then resided in Harstad for two years as a Premier Lieutenant, also taking the State School of Gymnastics in 1917. He returned to Kristiania, and was in 1919 promoted to Captain in the infantry.

== National-level career ==
In Kristiania, he joined the sports club IF Ørnulf and made a local breakthrough in an athletics meet in 1913. Løvland then entered the 1914 Norwegian Championships, and won the 110 metres hurdles. He also managed a bronze medal in the long jump and silver in the javelin throw. He did not enter the 1915 or 1916 championships.

Løvland returned to win four more national titles in the high hurdles, in 1917, 1918, 1919 and 1920. He also won the long jump in 1919. He did that by erasing Ferdinand Bie's championship record, but in turn, Sverre Hansen overtook it in 1921. Moreover Løvland took three silver medals in the discus throw before winning the event in 1920, and won silver and bronze medals in the javelin in 1917, 1919 and 1920.

Coming late into the combined events, Løvland won the Norwegian titles in the pentathlon in 1918 and 1919 as well as decathlon in 1919 and 1920. He set Norway's first official pentathlon record in 1918, and improved it three times in 1918 and 1919. His last record stood until 1933. Løvland's only decathlon record was set in July 1919 at Frogner Stadium. The points score was 7786.920 following the scoring system at the time; the modern scoring system (from 1985) sets it to 6033 points. As a Norwegian record, it stood until 1931, although that score was lower according to the modern system. His 7786.920 score was also an unofficial world record; official world records were not instituted until 1922.

When it came to the Norwegian record in the 110 metres hurdles, Løvland faced 15.8 set by Ferdinand Bie in 1912. Løvland tied the result twice in 1918, and also improved it by 0.1 second in 1919, but all four results were disregarded as records. In three instances, it happened according to the rule at the time (until 1934) that no hurdles could be overturned. Løvland finally beat Bie's time in August 1919, clocking in 15.7 seconds in Bergen. One week later, he lowered it to 15.3 seconds at Frogner Stadium. This record was tied once by himself and six times by others until Holger Albrechtsen overtook it in 1929.

Løvland was also a gymnast, with his exploits in both sports awarding him the Egebergs Honorary Prize in 1919. The King's Cup, awarded to the best overall athlete at the Norwegian Championships, was given to Løvland in 1919 and 1920.

== Olympic gold ==
Partially owing to World War I, Løvland would enter only one international competition, the 1920 Olympic Games. Here, he was also Norway's flag bearer. The first event was the pentathlon, where Løvland only finished fifth. The pentathlon did not include his favourite event, the 110 metres hurdles.

Having tied with Brutus Hamilton in the pentathlon, the American became Løvland's main rival in the decathlon. Hamilton took the lead after the first event, the 100 metres, which was exacerbated by the long jump and shot put. Løvland performed below par in the long jump, but beat Hamilton in the 400 metres and high hurdles, and became the overall winner of the discus throw. Løvland also set a personal best in the pole vault, and according to the scorekeepers, he had the chance of winning the decathlon if he finished the 1500 metres 9 seconds faster than Hamilton. As Løvland finished 9.4 seconds ahead of Hamilton (4:48.4 versus 4:57.8 minutes), the Norwegian camp celebrated victory. Some declared Hamilton the winner, and following numerous messages back and forth, the 1500 metres score as well as Løvland's points score in the discus was also corrected, and he was finally pronounced winner. Løvland retired after the Olympics.

Løvland's Olympic victory score was 6803.355 points; 5803 according to the 1985 scoring system. Løvland is the oldest decathlon winner at the Olympics. He was Norway's second Olympic champion in the combined events, though Ferdinand Bie's pentathlon victory in 1912 has been revised, first as a joint gold with Jim Thorpe, and finally with Thorpe as the sole victor. Løvland would eventually be followed by Markus Rooth who won the Olympic decathlon of 2024. In between, Norway also had the 1946 European champion in the decathlon, Godtfred Holmvang, who spoke on being directly inspired by Løvland growing up, as they resided in the same district, and Holmvang was impressed by Løvland's physical stature.

== Post-active career ==
From 1921, Løvland served in the Norwegian Armed Forces as Sports Inspector until 1930. He was then secretary-general of the Norwegian Confederation of Sports and the Norwegian Olympic Committee until 1940.

He also impacted a generation with his textbook on training instructions, Idrettsbok for norske gutter (1925). Other books include Fri-idrett (1924), Helse- og treningslære (1938) and Hold deg i form (1940).

The occupation of Norway by Nazi Germany entailed a sports strike, in which most of organized sports in Norway ceased its activity, in part orchestrated by Løvland. He was later arrested in August 1943 during the occupying power's crackdown on military officers. He was shipped to Germany and imprisoned in Schildberg and Luckenwalde.

After the war, he returned to the Armed Forces as a sports consultant, also chairing its Sports Council (Forsvarets idrettsråd) from 1948 to his retirement in 1955. He reached the rank of Major in 1950 and Lieutenant Colonel in 1953. He also sat on the planning committee for the Norwegian School of Sport Sciences, which would eventually be built at Sognsvann. Løvland was further decorated with the Ling Medal from the Swedish Gymnastics Federation in 1939, the King's Medal of Merit in gold in 1940, and the Swedish Sports Confederation Gold Medal in 1954.

== Personal life ==
Løvland married Gerd Holmboe Helmers (1898–1986) in August 1921; they had a daughter in 1923 and sons in 1925 and 1930. They resided in three different then-suburbs of Oslo, Grefsen from 1921, Blommenholm from 1926, and Smestad from 1935. Løvland was active within pistol shooting, chairing the Norske Offiserers Pistolklubb in 1948–1950, and was also a hobby chess player. He died in Oslo in 1984. A bronze relief depicting Løvland was unveiled in Froland on 9 June 2001.

Awards and achievements
Preceded by Gunnar Andersen	Egebergs Ærespris; 1919	Succeeded by Harald Strøm
Preceded by none (1912)	Olympic flag bearer for Norway; 1920	Succeeded by Harald Strøm (1924 Winter)
