= Wilkinson matrix =

Numerical lineral algebra

In linear algebra, Wilkinson matrices are symmetric, tridiagonal, order-N matrices with pairs of nearly, but not exactly, equal eigenvalues. It is named after the British mathematician James H. Wilkinson. For N = 7, the Wilkinson matrix is given by

$$\begin{bmatrix}
3 & 1 & 0 & 0 & 0 & 0 & 0 \\
1 & 2 & 1 & 0 & 0 & 0 & 0 \\
0 & 1 & 1 & 1 & 0 & 0 & 0 \\
0 & 0 & 1 & 0 & 1 & 0 & 0 \\
0 & 0 & 0 & 1 & 1 & 1 & 0 \\
0 & 0 & 0 & 0 & 1 & 2 & 1 \\
0 & 0 & 0 & 0 & 0 & 1 & 3 \\
\end{bmatrix}.$$

Wilkinson matrices have applications in many fields, including scientific computing, numerical linear algebra, and signal processing.
