= Nieves Hernández =

Mexican footballer (1901-1986)

Personal information
- Date of birth: 30 October 1901
- Date of death: 11 October 1986 (aged 84)
- Position: Midfielder

Senior career*
Years	Team	Apps	(Gls)
- C.D. Marte

International career
1928	Mexico Olympic	1	(0)
- * Club domestic league appearances and goals

Nieves Hernández (30 October 1901 – 10 October 1986) was a Mexican footballer who represented his nation at the 1928 Summer Olympics in the Netherlands.
