= Ken Earl =

English cricketer

Personal information
- Full name: Kenneth John Earl
- Born: 10 November 1925; Low Fell, Gateshead, County Durham, England
- Died: 13 October 1986 (aged 60); Ryton, County Durham, England
- Batting: Right-handed
- Bowling: Right-arm fast-medium

Domestic team information
- Years: Team
- 1950: Minor Counties
- 1948–1965: Northumberland

Career statistics
Competition	First-class
Matches	2
Runs scored	4
Batting average	1.00
100s/50s	–/–
Top score	4
Balls bowled	370
Wickets	9
Bowling average	18.00
5 wickets in innings	1
10 wickets in match	–
Best bowling	5/75
Catches/stumpings	2/–
- Source: Cricinfo, 16 August 2012

Kenneth John Earl (10 November 1925 – 13 October 1986) was an English cricketer. Earl was a right-handed batsman who bowled right-arm fast-medium. He was born in Low Fell, Gateshead, County Durham. Earl was married to Barbara and had two sons, Alex (b1977) and James (b1982). Alex lives in Alberta, Canada, and James in Yorkshire, England.
