= Gottfried Eichelbrönner =

German politician

- Born: 12 November 1901; Bergtheim, Bavaria, Germany
- Died: 29 October 1986 (aged 84); Bergtheim, Bavaria, Germany
- Occupations: Farmer and politician
- Political party: Christian Social Union of Bavaria

Gottfried Eichelbrönner (12 November 1901 – 29 October 1986) was a German farmer and politician from the Christian Social Union of Bavaria. He was a member of the Landtag of Bavaria from 1946 to 1962.
