= Clyde S. Kilby =

American writer and academic

Clyde Samuel Kilby (26 September 1902, in Johnson City, Tennessee – 18 October 1986, in Columbus, Mississippi) was an American writer and English professor, best known for his scholarship on the Inklings, especially J. R. R. Tolkien and C. S. Lewis. A professor at Wheaton College (Illinois) for most of his life, Kilby founded the Marion E. Wade Center there, making it a center for the study of the Inklings, their friends (such as Dorothy Sayers), and their influences (such as George MacDonald).

== Biography ==
Kilby's parents, James Lafayette and Sophronia Kilby, lived along the Nolichuckey River in the north portion of East Tennessee's hill country. The youngest of eight children, he was the first of his family to graduate from college. While studying at the University of Arkansas, he worked part-time in the registrar's office at nearby John Brown University. Clyde graduated in 1929, and the next year married Martha Harris, a mathematics teacher at JBU. They moved to Minnesota, where Kilby earned a master's degree in 1931 from the University of Minnesota.

In 1935, Kilby moved to Wheaton, Illinois, where he became an assistant professor of English. In 1938, he earned his Ph.D. by correspondence from NYU. He became chair of the English department at Wheaton in 1951, a post he retained until 1966. Dr. Kilby retired from teaching at Wheaton in 1981, and retired to Columbus, Mississippi, his wife's hometown, where he died on October 18, 1986.

In his honour, the Clyde S. Kilby Award for Inkling Studies was issued (one notable winner is Colin Duriez), and also the Clyde S. Kilby Research Grant (Diana Pavlac Glyer is a recipient). There is a Clyde S. Kilby Chair at Wheaton College (currently Christina Bieber Lake).

== Lewis and Inkling scholarship ==
Kilby became interested in the works of Lewis in 1943 after reading The Case for Christianity, the first part of the later-published Mere Christianity. He then read all of Lewis' works, designed a popular course around the mythopoetic works of Lewis and Tolkien, and began a long-term correspondence with Lewis that lasted until the author's death in 1963. The fourteen letters of his correspondence with Lewis became the core of a collection of papers on first Lewis, then the Inklings, and finally a set of seven connected British authors:

- Owen Barfield
- G. K. Chesterton
- C. S. Lewis
- George MacDonald
- Dorothy L. Sayers
- J. R. R. Tolkien
- Charles Williams

This collection developed into the Marion E. Wade Center at Wheaton College, today a major resource for twentieth-century British literature scholarship. Kilby's portrait hangs in the Kilby Reading Room at the Wade Center, along with a plaque which reads in part:

Dr. Clyde S. Kilby (1902–1986) was the founder and first curator of the Marion E. Wade Collection. Dr. Kilby's career in the world of literature was a distinguished one. . . . In all [that he accomplished], Dr. Kilby was supported by his wife, Martha Harris Kilby. Mrs. Kilby's lively interest, wise counsel, and dedicated work were the foundation for everything that Dr. Kilby did. Together, Clyde and Martha Kilby challenged generations of Wheaton students and others to seek the world of the imagination with all their heart and mind.

== Students ==
- Rolland Hein
- John Piper
- Robert Siegel

== Bibliography ==
- 1959: Minority of One: the Biography of Jonathan Blanchard.
- 1964: The Christian World of C.S. Lewis.
- 1968: Niekas 19:39-41
  - "Many Meetings with Tolkien: An Edited Transcript of Remarks at the December 1966 TSA Meeting"
- 1973 C S Lewis : Image Of His World
- 1976: Tolkien & The Silmarillion
- 1982: Brothers and Friends: The Diaries of Major Warren Hamilton Lewis (with Marjorie Lamp Mead)
- 1984: Mythlore #10
  - "The Outer Dimension of Myth"
- 1995: Myth, Allegory and Gospel
  - "Mythic and Christian Elements in Tolkien"

== Awards ==
- 1971 - Mythopoeic Award, Mythopoeic Scholarship Award for Inklings Studies
