= Michael Player =

American serial killer

- Born: September 6, 1960; Los Angeles, California, U.S.
- Died: October 10, 1986 (aged 26); Los Angeles, California, U.S.
- Cause of death: Suicide by firearm
- Other names: "The Skid Row Slayer"; Marcus Nisby
- Conviction: N/A
- Penalty: N/A

Details
- Victims: 10
- Span of crimes: September – October 1986
- Country: United States
- State: California
- Date apprehended: N/A

Michael Player (September 6, 1960 – October 10, 1986) was an American serial killer who committed a total of ten murders in the Los Angeles neighborhood of Skid Row, earning him the nickname The Skid Row Slayer. Since the mid-1970s, it was the third case of a serial killer who operated in the area.

== Early years ==
Little is known about Michael Player's early life. He was born in 1960 and led a criminal lifestyle under the nickname Marcus Nisby, for which he was prosecuted several times by the Californian authorities in the late 1970s. At the turn of the 1980s, he was convicted of a robbery, and in October 1983, he was arrested while trying to commit theft, convicted again, and sentenced to six months in prison.

In the summer of 1984, he was arrested for illegal possession of weapons, again convicted, and sentenced to two years of imprisonment. Having received parole in 1985, Player again committed several minor offenses, as a result of which he was arrested for violating the conditions of parole and received a 60-day prison sentence in July 1985.

== Murders ==
As victims, Player chose mostly homeless people who led a marginal existence, attacking them from behind and shooting them execution style. All of the killings were committed in the early hours of the day. The murders began on September 4, 1986, when Player walked up behind 54-year-old Rudolfo Roque and shot him in the back of the head. Roque was not homeless and had arrived from San Diego a few days earlier for the purpose of visiting a friend.

After killing Roque, Michael got rid of the weapon but failed to escape in time and was detained by police. After being interrogated at the police station, he was released due to a lack of evidence. The next five murders were all of homeless people and all of them were shot while sleeping. A few days after Roque's killing, Player shot dead 66-year-old Rick Stamps. On September 13, he shot dead 31-year-old Rojello Sirven and wounded 47-year-old Joseph Griffin in the Skid Row area. Griffin initially survived, despite his serious injuries, but succumbed to his injuries due to complications on October 5.

On September 20, 66-year-old Marshall Singer was shot in the back of the head. Three days later, Player shot 36-year-old David Towns, after which he committed a double murder. On September 30, he shot and killed 25-year-old Christopher Boyle and 56-year-old Leon Gaines in separate attacks. On October 7, he attacked and killed a 23-year-old Korean, Chang Kang. Like the first victim, Kang was not homeless and had come from Texas so he could visit some relatives. The day after, Player murdered 44-year-old Wayne Ellis in Athens Park while he was sleeping. On October 9, he attempted to kill Terrence Dunn, but he managed to survive. Dunn provided a description of the attacker to the authorities, on the basis of which a facial composite was created.

== Death and exposure ==
On October 10, 1986, Michael Player shot himself in a Los Angeles hotel. While investigating his death, a search was conducted on the apartment, during which police located bloodstained shoes and two pistols, .38 and .22 caliber. A ballistic examination subsequently confirmed that all the victims had been killed with the weapons belonging to Player. Terrence Dunn, the only surviving victim, also identified him from a photograph as the same man who had tried to kill him on October 9. Based on these facts, the police pinned all ten murders on the now-deceased Player, and was announced to media representatives by Los Angeles Police Chief Daryl Gates in February 1987. The reason for Player's suicide, as well as his motive for the murders, remains unclear.

== See also ==
- Vaughn Greenwood
- Skid Row Stabber

General:

- List of serial killers in the United States
