= Frank Samblebe =

Australian rules footballer, born 1915

Personal information
- Full name: Frank Andrew Samblebe
- Born: 28 January 1915; Cohuna, Victoria
- Died: 1 October 1986 (aged 71); Prahran, Victoria
- Original team: Melbourne High
- Height: 177 cm (5 ft 10 in)
- Weight: 79 kg (174 lb)
- Position: Defence

Playing career^{1}
Years	Club	Games (Goals)
1937–40, 1943	Hawthorn	53 (1)
- ^{1} Playing statistics correct to the end of 1943.

Frank Andrew Samblebe (28 January 1915 – 1 October 1986) was an Australian rules footballer who played with Hawthorn in the Victorian Football League (VFL).

Samblebe made his debut in 1937, he was recruited from Teachers College (V.A.F.A.) where he was studying to become a school teacher. He played most of his career playing off the back flank where he was required to run in straight lines. In 1939 Samblebe broke his arm against Fitzroy in round 4 and missed the rest of the season. He returned to the team in 1940. His employment with the Education Department as a school teacher kept him away for the 1941 and 1942 seasons.

He had one final hoo-haw in 1943 before retiring for good.

Samblebe was the principal of the Westall High School when the UFO incident occurred at his school.
