= Eero Lehtonen =

Finnish track and field athlete

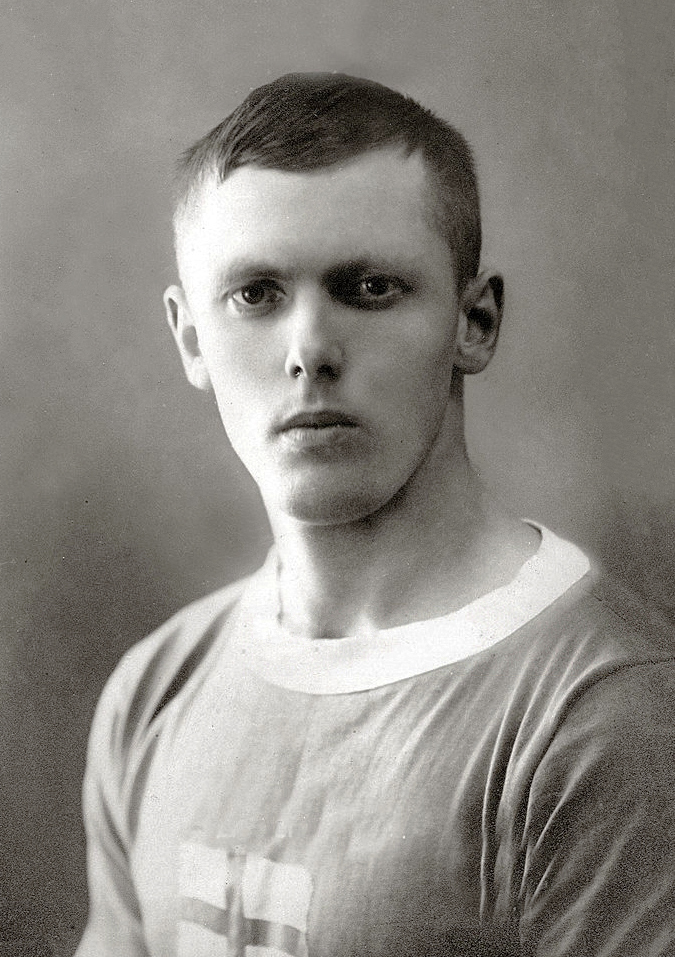
- Eero Lehtonen c. 1920

Personal information
- Born: 21 April 1898 Mikkeli, Finland
- Died: 9 November 1959 (aged 61) Helsinki, Finland
- Height: 1.84 m (6 ft 0 in)
- Weight: 78 kg (172 lb)

Sport
- Sport: Athletics
- Event: Pentathlon
- Club: Mikkelin Kilpa-Veikot, Mikkeli

Achievements and titles
- Personal bests: 400 m – 53.0 (1924); LJ – 7.02 m (1920); Pentathlon – 3416 (1924)
Medal record
Representing Finland
Olympic Games
Gold medal – first place	1920 Antwerp	Pentathlon
Gold medal – first place	1924 Paris	Pentathlon

Eero Reino Lehtonen (21 April 1898 – 9 November 1959) was a Finnish athlete. He competed at the 1920 Olympics in the pentathlon, long jump, and decathlon, and at the 1924 Olympics in the pentathlon and 4 × 400 m relay. He won the pentathlon at both Games, but performed poorly in other events. He retired after learning that the pentathlon was excluded from the 1928 Olympics.

In 1920, Lehtonen won the national titles in the pentathlon and long jump, setting a new national long jump record at 7.02 m. At the 1920 Olympics, he tried the decathlon, but gave up after five events. He semi-retired after the Olympics but returned in 1922, winning the national long jump and pentathlon titles again. At the 1924 Olympic pentathlon, Robert LeGendre set a world record in the long jump, but Lehtonen performed better overall and won the gold medal.

In 1984, a bronze statue of Lehtonen was installed at the sports park in Mikkeli, his hometown.
