= Carl-Enock Svensson =

Swedish athlete

Personal information
- Nationality: Swedish
- Born: 3 January 1895 Lund, Sweden
- Died: 27 October 1986 (aged 91) Lund, Sweden

Sport
- Sport: Athletics
- Event: Pentathlon

Carl-Enock Svensson (3 January 1895 – 27 October 1986) was a Swedish athlete. He competed in the men's pentathlon at the 1920 Summer Olympics.
