= Wilkinson's polynomial =

Polynomial in numerical analysis

Graph of Wilkinson's polynomial

Graph of $\sgn(w(x))\ln(1+|w(x)|)$

In numerical analysis, Wilkinson's polynomial is a specific polynomial which was used by James H. Wilkinson in 1963 to illustrate a difficulty when finding the roots of a polynomial: the location of the roots can be very sensitive to perturbations in the coefficients of the polynomial.

The polynomial is
$$w(x) = \prod_{i=1}^{20} (x - i) = (x-1) (x-2) \cdots (x-20).$$
Sometimes, the term Wilkinson's polynomial is also used to refer to some other polynomials appearing in Wilkinson's discussion.

== Background ==
Wilkinson's polynomial arose in the study of algorithms for finding the roots of a polynomial
$$p(x) = \sum_{i=0}^n c_i x^i.$$
It is a natural question in numerical analysis to ask whether the problem of finding the roots of p from the coefficients c_{i} is well-conditioned. That is, we hope that a small change in the coefficients will lead to a small change in the roots. Unfortunately, this is not the case here.

The problem is ill-conditioned when the polynomial has a multiple root. For instance, the polynomial x^{2} has a double root at x = 0. However, the polynomial x^{2} − ε (a perturbation of size ε) has roots at ±√ε, which is much bigger than ε when ε is small.

It is therefore natural to expect that ill-conditioning also occurs when the polynomial has zeros which are very close. However, the problem may also be extremely ill-conditioned for polynomials with well-separated zeros. Wilkinson used the polynomial w(x) to illustrate this point (Wilkinson 1963).

In 1984, he described the personal impact of this discovery:

Speaking for myself I regard it as the most traumatic experience in my career as a numerical analyst.

Wilkinson's polynomial is often used to illustrate the undesirability of naively computing eigenvalues of a matrix by first calculating the coefficients of the matrix's characteristic polynomial and then finding its roots, since using the coefficients as an intermediate step may introduce an extreme ill-conditioning even if the original problem was well-conditioned.

== Conditioning of Wilkinson's polynomial ==
Wilkinson's polynomial
$$w(x) = \prod_{i=1}^{20} (x - i) = (x-1)(x-2) \cdots (x-20)$$
clearly has 20 roots, located at x = 1, 2, ..., 20. These roots are far apart. However, the polynomial is still very ill-conditioned.

Expanding the polynomial, one finds
$$\begin{align}
w(x) = {} & x^{20}-210 x^{19}+20615 x^{18}-1256850x^{17}+53327946 x^{16} \\
& {}-1672280820x^{15}+40171771630 x^{14}-756111184500x^{13} \\
& {}+11310276995381x^{12}-135585182899530x^{11} \\
& {}+1307535010540395x^{10}-10142299865511450x^9 \\
& {}+63030812099294896x^8-311333643161390640x^7 \\
& {}+1206647803780373360x^6-3599979517947607200x^5 \\
& {}+8037811822645051776x^4-12870931245150988800x^3 \\
& {}+13803759753640704000x^2-8752948036761600000x \\
& {}+2432902008176640000.
\end{align}$$

If the coefficient of x^{19} is decreased from −210 by 2^{−23} to −210.0000001192, then the polynomial value w(20) decreases from 0 to −2^{−23} 20^{19} = −6.25×10^{17}, and the root at x = 20 grows to x ≈ 20.8. The roots at x = 18 and x = 19 collide into a double root at x ≈ 18.62 which turns into a pair of complex conjugate roots at x ≈ 19.5 ± 1.9i as the perturbation increases further. The 20 roots become (to 5 decimals)
$$\begin{array}{rrrrr}
1.00000 & 2.00000 & 3.00000 & 4.00000 & 5.00000 \\[8pt]
6.00001 & 6.99970 & 8.00727 & 8.91725 & 20.84691 \\[8pt]
10.09527\pm {} & 11.79363 \pm {} & 13.99236\pm{} & 16.73074\pm{} & 19.50244 \pm {} \\[-3pt]
0.64350i & 1.65233i & 2.51883i & 2.81262i & 1.94033i
\end{array}$$

Some of the roots are greatly displaced, even though the change to the coefficient is tiny and the original roots seem widely spaced. Wilkinson showed by the stability analysis discussed in the next section that this behavior is related to the fact that some roots α (such as α = 15) have many roots β that are "close" in the sense that |α − β| is smaller than |α|.

Wilkinson chose the perturbation of 2^{−23} because his Pilot ACE computer had 30-bit floating point significands, so for numbers around 210, 2^{−23} was an error in the first bit position not represented in the computer. The two real numbers −210 and −210 − 2^{−23} are represented by the same floating point number, which means that 2^{−23} is the unavoidable error in representing a real coefficient close to −210 by a floating point number on that computer. The perturbation analysis shows that 30-bit coefficient precision is insufficient for separating the roots of Wilkinson's polynomial.

== Stability analysis ==
Suppose that we perturb a polynomial p(x) = Π (x − α_{j}) with roots α_{j} by adding a small multiple t·c(x) of a polynomial c(x), and ask how this affects the roots α_{j}. To first order, the change in the roots will be controlled by the derivative
$${d\alpha_j \over dt} = -{c(\alpha_j)\over p^\prime(\alpha_j)}.$$
When the derivative is small, the roots will be more stable under variations of t, and conversely if this derivative is large the roots will be unstable. In particular, if α_{j} is a multiple root, then the denominator vanishes. In this case, α_{j} is usually not differentiable with respect to t (unless c happens to vanish there), and the roots will be extremely unstable.

For small values of t the perturbed root is given by the power series expansion in t
$$\alpha_j + {d\alpha_j \over dt} t + {d^2\alpha_j \over dt^2} {t^2\over 2!} + \cdots$$
and one expects problems when |t| is larger than the radius of convergence of this power series, which is given by the smallest value of |t| such that the root α_{j} becomes multiple. A very crude estimate for this radius takes half the distance from α_{j} to the nearest root, and divides by the derivative above.

In the example of Wilkinson's polynomial of degree 20, the roots are given by α_{j} = j for j = 1, ..., 20, and c(x) is equal to x^{19}. So the derivative is given by
$${d\alpha_j \over dt} = -{\alpha_j^{19}\over \prod_{k\ne j}(\alpha_j-\alpha_k)} = -\prod_{k\ne j}{\alpha_j\over \alpha_j-\alpha_k} . \,\!$$
This shows that the root α_{j} will be less stable if there are many roots α_{k} close to α_{j}, in the sense that the distance |α_{j} − α_{k}| between them is smaller than |α_{j}|.

Example. For the root α_{1} = 1, the derivative is equal to 1/19! which is very small; this root is stable even for large changes in t. This is because all the other roots β are a long way from it, in the sense that |α_{1} − β| = 1, 2, 3, ..., 19 is larger than |α_{1}| = 1. For example, even if t is as large as –10000000000, the root α_{1} only changes from 1 to about 0.99999991779380 (which is very close to the first order approximation 1 + t/19! ≈ 0.99999991779365). Similarly, the other small roots of Wilkinson's polynomial are insensitive to changes in t.

Example. On the other hand, for the root α_{20} = 20, the derivative is equal to −20^{19}/19! which is huge (about 43000000), so this root is very sensitive to small changes in t. The other roots β are close to α_{20}, in the sense that |β − α_{20}| = 1, 2, 3, ..., 19 is less than |α_{20}| = 20. For t = −2^{−23}, the first-order approximation 20 − t·20^{19}/19! = 25.137... to the perturbed root 20.84... is terrible; this is even more obvious for the root α_{19} where the perturbed root has a large imaginary part but the first-order approximation (and for that matter all higher-order approximations) are real. The reason for this discrepancy is that |t| ≈ 0.000000119 is greater than the radius of convergence of the power series mentioned above (which is about 0.0000000029, somewhat smaller than the value 0.00000001 given by the crude estimate) so the linearized theory does not apply. For a value such as t = 0.000000001 that is significantly smaller than this radius of convergence, the first-order approximation 19.9569... is reasonably close to the root 19.9509...

At first sight the roots α_{1} = 1 and α_{20} = 20 of Wilkinson's polynomial appear to be similar, as they are on opposite ends of a symmetric line of roots, and have the same set of distances 1, 2, 3, ..., 19 from other roots. However the analysis above shows that this is grossly misleading: the root α_{20} = 20 is less stable than α_{1} = 1 (to small perturbations in the coefficient of x^{19}) by a factor of 20^{19} = 5242880000000000000000000.

== Wilkinson's second example ==
The second example considered by Wilkinson is
$$w_2(x) = \prod_{i=1}^{20} (x - 2^{-i}) = (x-2^{-1})(x-2^{-2}) \cdots (x-2^{-20}).$$
The twenty roots of this polynomial are in a geometric progression with common ratio 2, and hence the quotient
$$\alpha_j\over \alpha_j-\alpha_k$$
cannot be large. Indeed, the roots of w_{2} are quite stable to large relative changes in the coefficients.

== The effect of the basis ==
The expansion
$$p(x) = \sum_{i=0}^n c_i x^i$$
expresses the polynomial in a particular basis, namely that of the monomials. If the polynomial is expressed in another basis, then the problem of finding its roots may cease to be ill-conditioned. For example, in a Lagrange form, a small change in one (or several) coefficients need not change the roots too much. Indeed, the basis polynomials for interpolation at the points 0, 1, 2, ..., 20 are
$$\ell_k(x) = \prod_{i = 0,\ldots,20 \atop i \neq k} \frac{x - i}{k - i}, \qquad\text{for}\quad  k=0,\ldots,20.$$

Every polynomial (of degree 20 or less) can be expressed in this basis:
$$p(x) = \sum_{i=0}^{20} d_i \ell_i(x).$$

For Wilkinson's polynomial, we find
$$w(x) = (20!) \ell_0(x) = \sum_{i=0}^{20} d_i \ell_i(x) \quad\text{with}\quad d_0=(20!) ,\, d_1=d_2= \cdots =d_{20}=0.$$

Given the definition of the Lagrange basis polynomial ℓ_{0}(x), a change in the coefficient d_{0} will produce no change in the roots of w. However, a perturbation in the other coefficients (all equal to zero) will slightly change the roots. Therefore, Wilkinson's polynomial is well-conditioned in this basis.
