= George Mandy =

South African cricketer

Personal information
- Born: 13 July 1906; Bathurst District, South Africa
- Died: 12 October 1986 (aged 80); Grahamstown, South Africa
- Source: Cricinfo, 12 December 2020

George Mandy (13 July 1906 – 12 October 1986) was a South African cricketer. He played in nineteen first-class matches from 1926/27 to 1947/48.
