= Axel-Erik Gyllenstolpe =

Swedish decathlete

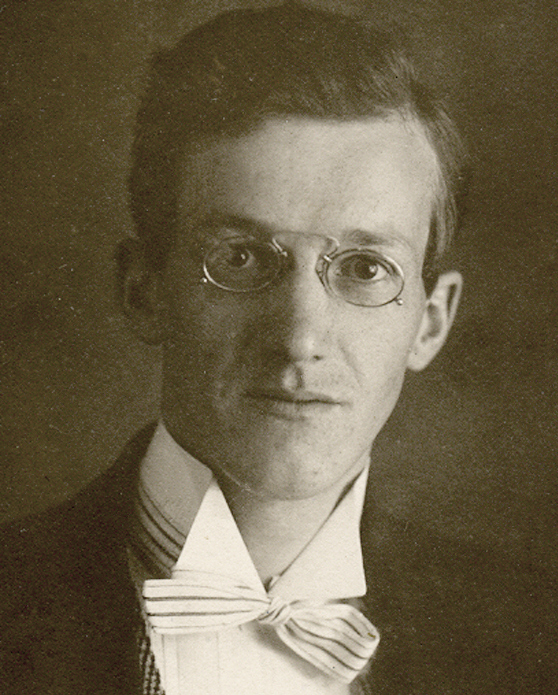

Personal information
- Born: 18 April 1894 Filipstad, Sweden
- Died: 19 July 1954 (aged 60) Karlstad, Sweden

Sport
- Sport: Athletics
- Event: Decathlon
- Club: GSGF, Gävle

Achievements and titles
- Personal best(s): Decathlon – 6000 (1921); 110 mH – 15.9 (1920); 400 mH – 61.8 (1917); HJ – 1.80 m (1919); LJ – 6.80 m (1919); JT – 55.12 m (1920)

Karl Johan Axel-Erik "Gyllen" Gyllenstolpe (18 April 1894 – 19 July 1954) was a Swedish track and field athlete. He competed in the 1920 Summer Olympics and placed eighth in the decathlon event. He also finished ninth in the pentathlon, though he did not start in the final 1500 metres run.
