= Everett Bradley (athlete) =

American pentathlete (1897–1969)

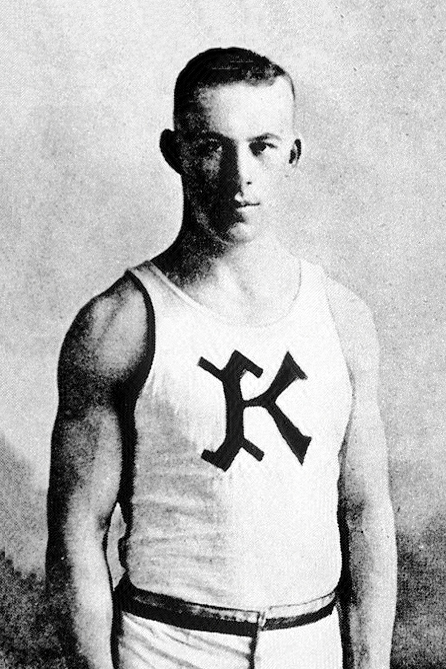
- Bradley around age 22 in U. Kansas Track Jersey circa 1920

Personal information
- Born: May 19, 1897 Cedar Rapids, Iowa, United States
- Died: July 25, 1969 (aged 72) Wichita, Kansas, United States
- Education: University of Kansas
- Occupation: Bradley Brothers Oil founder
- Height: 1.78 m (5 ft 10 in)
- Weight: 79 kg (174 lb)
- Spouse: Margaret Matthews Leighty
- Children: 3 sons

Sport
- Sport: Athletics
- Events: Decathlon, javelin throw, long jump
- College team: University of Kansas
- Club: Kansas Jayhawks, Lawrence
- Coached by: Karl Schlademan (U. of Kansas); John Francis Moakley (Olympics)

Achievements and titles
- Personal bests: Javelin – 47.42 m (1920); Long Jump – 7.08 m (1922); Decathlon – 6,138 pts. (1920)
Medal record
Representing the United States
Olympic Games
Silver medal – second place	1920 Antwerp	Pentathlon

Everett Lewis Bradley (May 19, 1897 – July 25, 1969) was an American track and field athlete who competed for the University of Kansas, and won a silver medal at the 1920 Olympics in Atwerp, Belguim in the Pentathlon. In 1929, he founded the Bradley Brothers Oil Company with his brother and after leasing Rice County's Welch Oil field, the site of Bornholdt field, his wells became highly productive, allowing him to amass a considerable fortune through the 1940's.

== Early life ==
Bradle was born May 19, 1897 in Cedar Rapids, Iowa. After a family move, he competed for the Cherokee High School track team, in Cherokee, Oklahoma, possibly the school currently known as Sequoyah High School in Cherokee County, Oklahoma. At the Ark Valley Track meet in 1917, he scored a total of 23 of his high school's total 29 points, easily becoming the meet's high points scorer, and accumulating more individual points than the second place team from Wichita High School. In the well-known and highly attended Pennsylvania Relays in 1920, he was recognized as one of the country's top track and field athletes. While attending Cherokee High School, in April, 1918 as a High School Senior, Bradley held Alfalfa County records of 48 feet, 8 inches in the 12-lb. shot-put, 110 feet, 6 inches in the discus throw in 1917, and held a second place county record in the high jump of 5 feet 8 inches.

== 1920 Olympic trials ==
In July, 1920, he qualified for the 1920 Summer Olympics, held in July in Harvard Stadium in Cambridge, Massachusetts, Traverse Island, New York, and New York City. He qualified for the Olympics with a second place finish in the decathlon and a third place finish in the pentathlon.

== 1920 Antwerp Olympics ==
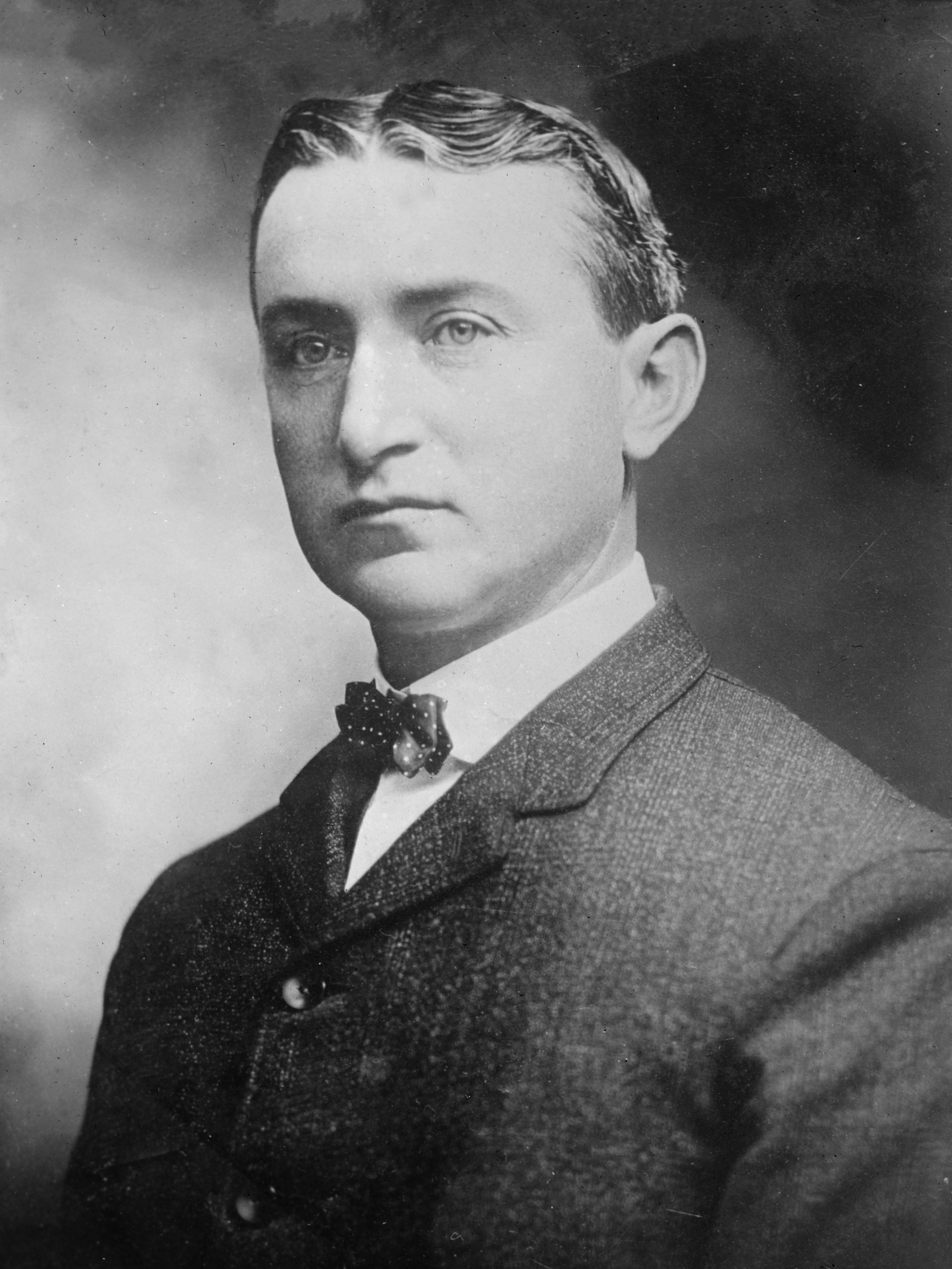
Track Coach Moakley

Though he had excelled in a variety of track and field events, Bradley competed only in the Pentathlon at the 1920 Antwerp Olympics, where he won a silver medal and was coached by Head 1920 U.S. Olympic Track and Field Coach John Francis Moakley, the track and field coach for Cornell University. Gold medalist Ero Lehtonen of Finland won the event by a large margin with points in 1985 tables of 3383, with Bradley a distant second with 3165 points, and Hugo Lahtinen also of Finland, the bronze medalist with 3270 points in 1985 tables.

Gold medalist Lehtonen easily established his lead, and moved to first place by the second event, the javelin throw. He never lost his lead, finishing in a second or first position in all but one of the five events. A close battle took place for the silver and bronze medals, however. Bradley, Hugo Lahtinen of Finland, Hege Lovland of Norway, and Brutus Hamilton of the U.S. were very close in the scoring system throughout much of the competition. Bradley managed to finish ahead of Americans Brutus Hamilton of the U.S. and Bob Legendre of the U.S., who finished third and fourth, though they had outscored him in the Olympic trial competition.

=== University of Kansas ===
Enrolling around the Fall of 1918, and graduating in June 1922, Bradley ran track for the University of Kansas under Head Coach Karl Schlademan. He graduated with a degree in geology around 1922, serving as a team Captain beginning as a Sophomore the year in which he won his pentathlon silver medal at the 1920 Olympics. Later in 1939, he received the Kansas University Haworth Award for Distinguished Alumni in Geology.

By April 1921, Bradley had completed a broad jump of 23 feet, 1 inch, after winning the Pentathlon at the 1920 Penn relays.

=== Oil career ===
Bradley later worked for his own oil company Bradley brothers, which he founded with his brother Orval in 1929. In 1939, his company purchased leases near Rice County's Welch Oil field, the site of the Bornholdt field, which together with the Welch, Windom, and Ogallah fields produced close to 30 million barrels of oil, worth in the billions of dollars in modern currency. Continuing to work in oil production, he eventually accumulated considerable wealth.

=== Marriage ===
Bradley was married on the evening of June 14, 1940 to Margaret Matthews Leighty of Wichita and Washington, Kansas, in Wichita's St. James Episcopal Church. The couple met at the University of Kansas, in Lawrence and both were graduates. They planned to intially reside in the Wichita area after their wedding trip.

In public service, in 1959, Bradley served in the role of President for the Wichita Crime Commission.

Bradley died on July 26, 1969 at the age of 72 in Wichita, Kansas. He was found near his house in a pond, still in his night wear. The coroner ruled the death a likely drowning. He was survived by his widow Margaret, three sons, and his brother in business, Orval. Services were held July 28, 1969 at Downing Mortuary. A Kansas University geology scholarship was set up as a memorial in association with the University of Kansas Endowment Association.
