= Marion E. Wade Center =

Coordinates: 41.8706°N 88.1012°W

The Marion E. Wade Center at Wheaton College (Illinois) is a special research collection of papers, books, and manuscripts, primarily relating to seven authors from the United Kingdom. Four of them are the Inklings Owen Barfield, C. S. Lewis, J. R. R. Tolkien, and Charles Williams. The other authors are G. K. Chesterton, George MacDonald, and Dorothy L. Sayers. The collection also includes materials on Lewis's wife, the poet Joy Davidman. The center is named after Marion E. Wade, founder of ServiceMaster.

The Wade Center serves primarily as a research center, attracting scholars from around the world. It holds at least one copy of every book written by the Wade authors, plus books, articles, and other materials about the writers. It holds the world's fullest collection of Sayers's writings, including 30,000 pages of letters and documents both published and unpublished. For some of the Wade authors, collections of family documents are also available.

The center's museum features memorabilia and changing displays about the authors from its collection of books, letters, manuscripts, and artifacts.

== History and organization ==
The center was founded in 1965 by Clyde S. Kilby. In 2001 a new building was completed at the edge of the Wheaton College campus to house the Wade Center, with an expanded reading room, classroom space, and an enlarged exhibits area. C. S. Lewis's dining-room table, which used to serve as desk space for visiting researchers, has been moved into the exhibits area near the Wade's own Lewis wardrobe.

The Wade Center's second director, after Kilby, was Lyle W. Dorsett, who headed the center from 1983 until 1990. From 1994 until 2013, the small staff was headed by director Christopher W. Mitchell (author of Through the Wardrobe and into the Mind of C. S. Lewis, 2009), until his departure to teach at Torrey Honors Institute at Biola University. From 2013 until 2018, Marjorie Lamp Mead acted as interim director of the Wade Center. She is the author of A Reader's Guide Through the Wardrobe: Exploring C. S. Lewis's Classic Story, and of A Reader's Guide To Caspian: a journey into C. S. Lewis's Narnia. From July 2018, the Wade Center was headed by co-directors David Downing and Crystal Downing. David C. Downing is the author of four scholarly books on C.S. Lewis: Planets in Peril, The Most Reluctant Convert, Into the Wardrobe, and Into the Region of Awe. Crystal Downing has written two books on Dorothy Sayers, Writing Performances: The Stages of Dorothy L. Sayers, which was granted the Barbara Reynolds Award for best Sayers scholarship in 2009 by the Dorothy L. Sayers Society, and Subversive: Christ, Culture and the Shocking Dorothy L. Sayers along with nearly 100 other scholarly essays. Since July 2024, Jim Beitler has been serving as director of the Wade Center, alongside associate director Marjorie Lamp Mead. Beitler’s books include Seasoned Speech: Rhetoric in the Life of the Church and Charitable Writing: Cultivating Virtue Through Our Words (with co-author Richard Hughes Gibson).

The center hosts special events related to its authors, such as meetings of scholarly societies, book discussions and classes.

== Publications ==
The Wade Center publishes the journal VII: Journal of the Marion E. Wade Center, highlighting works by and about Wade-related authors, including Inklings and Tolkien research.
