= Hugo Lahtinen =

Finnish pentathlete (1891–1977)

Personal information
- Nationality: Finnish
- Born: Hugo Jalmari Lahtinen; 29 November 1891 Tampere, Grand Duchy of Finland, Russian Empire
- Died: 29 December 1977 (aged 86)
Medal record
Men's athletics
Representing Finland
Bronze medal – third place	1920 Antwerp	Pentathlon

Hugo Jalmari Lahtinen (29 November 1891, Tampere – 29 December 1977) was a Finnish athlete who mainly competed in the men's pentathlon during his career. He competed for Finland at the 1920 Summer Olympics in Antwerp, Belgium, where he won the bronze medal in the men's pentathlon.
