= Bertil Ohlson =

Swedish decathlete

Olympic medal record

Men's athletics

Representing Sweden
Bronze medal – third place	1920 Antwerp	Decathlon

Bertil Gustaf Emanuel Ohlson (22 January 1899 – 6 September 1970) was a Swedish athlete who competed mainly in the men's decathlon. He competed for Sweden in the 1920 Summer Olympics held in Antwerp, Belgium in the Decathlon, where he won the bronze medal.
