= Ole Reistad =

Norwegian athlete and officer (1898–1949)

Ole Imerslun Reistad
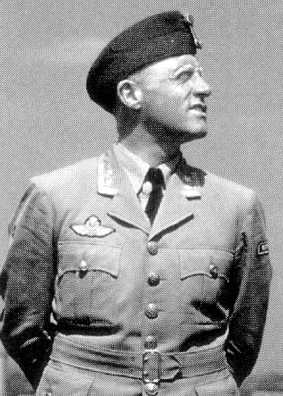
- Reistad as an oberstløytnant
- Born: 26 June 1898; Furuset, Oslo, Norway
- Died: 22 December 1949 (aged 51)
- Allegiance: Norway
- Service years: 1921–1949
- Rank: Oberst (Colonel) of the Royal Norwegian Army from 1946
- Commands: Commander of: • Scout Flight at Kjeller Airport (1939–1940); • Norwegian Army Air Service (1940); • Little Norway training camp (1941–1945); • Norwegian Air Command North (1945–1949)
- Conflicts: World War II
- Awards: • Egebergs Ærespris; • Royal Norwegian Order of St Olav
- Spouse: Bergljot
- Other work: Olympic athlete Aviation leader

Ole Imerslun Reistad (26 June 1898 – 22 December 1949) was a Norwegian military officer and accomplished sports person. He competed at the 1920 Summer Olympics in modern pentathlon, and also became Norwegian champion in the sport. He competed in military patrol at the 1928 Winter Olympics, winning the competition. During World War II, he was the leader of the training camp Little Norway in Canada.

== Personal life ==
Reistad was born in Aker; the son of Christen Reistad and Gudborg Imerslun. He was married to Bergljot Huseby from 1927. He died in Oslo in 1949, only 51 years old.

He is the great-grandfather of Norwegian handball player Henny Reistad.

== Sports career ==
In the pentathlon he finished fourteenth at the 1920 Summer Olympics and became Norwegian champion in 1922. He also participated in the 1928 Olympic Winter Games in St. Moritz, Switzerland, in the demonstration event military patrol. He was also the Norwegian flag bearer at the opening ceremony. In 1922, he was awarded the prestigious Norwegian sports award - the Egebergs Ærespris - for achievements in multiple sports.

== Military career ==
During the campaign following Nazi Germany's assault on Norway on 9 April 1940, Reistad was an air unit commander and led the operations from Bardufoss Air Station against the German forces.

Shortly before his death, he was appointed a Commander with the Star of the Order of St. Olav.

== Literature ==
- Ole Reistad, "The Spirit of Little Norway" (Biography), Edvard Omholt-Jensen.

Awards
Preceded by Harald Strøm	Egebergs Ærespris; 1922	Succeeded by Johan Støa
