= Peter Phelps (cricketer) =

English cricketer

Cricket information
- Batting: Right-handed
- Bowling: Right-arm medium

Career statistics
Competition	First-class
Matches	3
Runs scored	4
Batting average	11.00
100s/50s	0/0
Top score	25
Catches/stumpings	1/–
- Source: CricInfo, 7 November 2022

Peter Horsley Phelps (5 February 1909 – 5 October 1986) was an English first-class cricketer who played three matches for Worcestershire in the early 1930s.

He batted at six in each of his four innings, but was not a success: scores of 3, 7, 11 and 4 were hardly what the county was looking for. He was never called upon to bowl his medium pace at first-class level, but he did take a single catch, to dismiss Leicestershire's Harold Riley.

Phelps was born in Malvern, Worcestershire; he died aged 77 in Earlswood, Redhill, Surrey.
