= Aleksander Klumberg =

Estonian decathlete

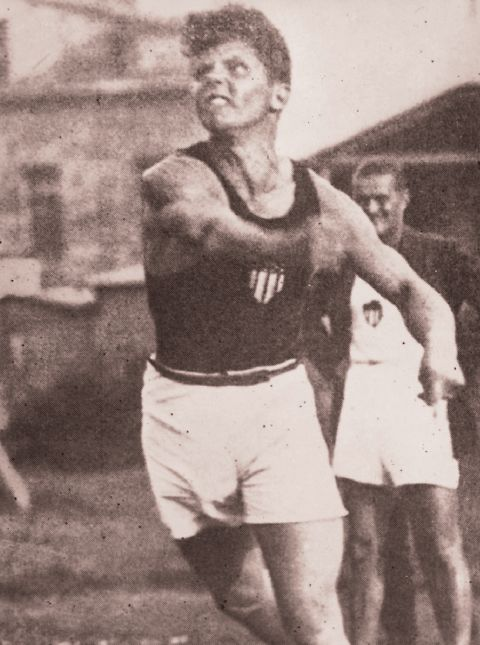

Personal information
- Born: 17 April 1899 Tallinn, Estonia, Russian Empire
- Died: 10 February 1958 (aged 58) Tallinn, then part of Estonian SSR, Soviet Union
- Height: 174 cm (5 ft 9 in)
- Weight: 74 kg (163 lb)

Sport
- Sport: Athletics
- Event: Decathlon
- Club: Kalev Tallinn

Achievements and titles
- Personal bests: Dec – 6087 (1922); JT – 63.60 m (1935); DT – 42.38 m (1922); SP – 13.63 m (1922); LJ – 7.20 m (1923); TJ – 14.33 m (1924); HJ – 1.83 m PV – 3:50 m 100 m – 11.6; 400 m – 54.4; 1500 m – 4:44.3; 110 mH – 16.4
Medal record
Representing Estonia
Olympic Games
| Bronze medal – third place | 1924 Paris | Decathlon |

Aleksander Klumberg (since 1936 Kolmpere; 17 April 1899 – 10 February 1958) was an Estonian decathlete. He represented Estonia in several events at the 1920 Summer Olympics in Antwerp, and won the bronze medal in the decathlon at the 1924 Summer Olympics in Paris. In 1922, he became the first official world record holder in the decathlon. Arrested by the Soviet occupation authorities during World War II, Klumberg was deported from Estonia, imprisoned in a Russian Gulag camp from 1945 to 1954, and deported to Siberia in 1954–1955.

Klumberg took up athletics around 1912 and, already in 1915–1917, set multiple records of the then Russian Empire in several jumping and throwing events. Besides athletics he won three Estonian titles in bandy. In 1918–1919, he fought in the Estonian War of Independence as a volunteer. After that he worked as a physical education instructor with the Estonian army (1919–20), military schools (1924–1926) and police schools (1927 and 1942–1944).

Klumberg represented Estonia in several track and field events at the 1920 Summer Olympics in Antwerp. At the British 1922 AAA Championships he finished third behind Vilho Niittymaa in the discus, third behind Paavo Johansson in the javelin and third behind Vilho Tuulos in the triple jump event.

In 1922, he became the first official world record holder in the decathlon (although with a performance inferior to the 1912 Olympics series of Jim Thorpe).

Klumberg won the bronze medal in the decathlon at the 1924 Summer Olympics in Paris.

Klumberg coached the national athletics teams of Poland (1927–1932) and Estonia, and in this capacity attended the 1928, 1932 and 1936 Summer Olympics. Klumberg was the coach of Janusz Kusociński when the Polish athlete won gold in the 10,000 meters event at the 1932 Summer Olympics in Los Angeles.

After the Soviet invasion of Estonia during World War II, Klumberg was arrested by the Soviet NKVD in 1944 and deported from Estonia to Russia, where he received a lengthy prison sentence. From 1945 to 1954 he was imprisoned at the Dubravlag, one of several Gulag special camps in the Mordovian ASSR for political prisoners. After the 1954 release from the prison camp, he was deported to the Krasnoyarsk region in Siberia. Soviet authorities permitted him to return to Estonia only in 1956. He died two years after that and was buried at the Rahumäe cemetery in Tallinn.

Records
| Preceded by First recognised holder | Men's Decathlon World Record Holder; 5 July 1920 – 12 July 1924 | Succeeded by (United States) Harold Osborn |
