= Robert LeGendre =

American pentathlete

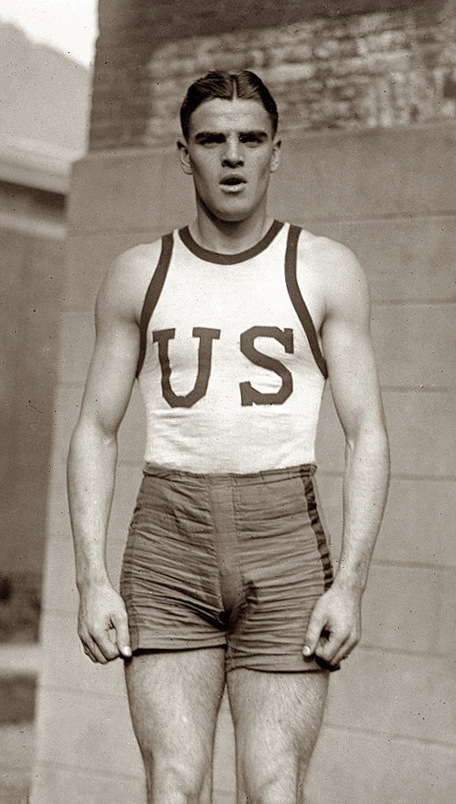
- Robert LeGendre in 1919

Personal information
- Born: January 7, 1898 Lewiston, Maine, United States
- Died: January 21, 1931 (aged 33) Brooklyn, New York, United States
- Education: Georgetown University
- Height: 1.90 m (6 ft 3 in)
- Weight: 88 kg (194 lb)

Sport
- Sport: Athletics
- Events: Pentathlon, decathlon, long jump
- Club: Polytechnic Harriers, London

Achievements and titles
- Personal bests: Decathlon – 6576 (1920); LJ – 7.76 m (1924); 200 m – 22.4 (1919)
Medal record
Representing the United States
Olympic Games
Bronze medal – third place	1924 Paris	Pentathlon

Robert "Bob" Lucien LeGendre (January 7, 1898 – January 21, 1931) was an American track and field athlete. He competed in the pentathlon at the 1920 and 1924 Summer Olympics and finished in fourth and third place, respectively. He failed to qualify for the 1924 Olympics in the long jump, yet at the 1924 Olympic pentathlon competition he set a world record in that event at 7.76 metres (25.5 ft). He won the pentathlon at the Inter-Allied Games in 1919, beating Eugene Vidal and Géo André.

Born in Lewiston, Maine to French-Canadian parents, LeGendre would lose his father at the age of 1, leaving his mother to raise Bob and his 9 siblings by herself (she would later pass while LeGendre was aged 19). He spent a year at Hebron Academy, before his enrollment at Georgetown University in Washington, D.C.

While studying at Georgetown, LeGendre also played American football and baseball. He earned Ph.D. and D.D.S. degrees there and signed a Hollywood contract as a film actor. He abandoned the movie career and became a dentist in Washington.

LeGendre died of bronchial pneumonia at the Naval Hospital in Brooklyn, New York, on January 21, 1931, aged 33.
