= Everett (given name) =

- Pronunciation: English: /eˈverˈett/
- Gender: Male

Origin
- Origin: English; German
- Meaning: brave as a boar, hardy

Other names
- See also: Evert, Everette, Everhard, Eberhard

Everett is a masculine given name. It is derived from the Old English name Eoforheard and the Germanic Eberhard.

Eoforheard has two elements: 'eofor' (boar), and 'heard' (brave, hardy). Thus Everett means brave as a boar or strong as a boar. Spelling variants include Evert (Dutch and Swedish) and Everette.

People with or referred to by the name include:

== Arts and music ==
- Everett Phipps Babcock, architect
- Everett Barksdale, American jazz guitarist
- E. F. Bleiler, American science fiction editor
- Everett Bradley (musician), American multi-instrumentalist
- Everett B. Cole, American science fiction writer
- Everett De Morier, American writer and playwright
- Everett Garrison, maker of bamboo fly rods
- Everett M. Gilmore, American tuba player
- Everett Helm, American composer
- Everett Gee Jackson, American impressionist painter
- Everett Leroy Jones, birthname of writer Amiri Baraka
- Everett Kinstler, American artist
- Everett Lee, American conductor and violinist
- Everett Lewis, American independent filmmaker
- Everett McCorvey, American tenor, conductor, and producer
- Everett Morton, English drummer
- Everett Nourse, organist
- Everett Owens, pen name for Rob Thomas
- Everett Peck, American illustrator, comics artist, cartoonist and animator
- J. Everett Prewitt, American novelist
- Everett Robbins, American pianist and composer
- Everett Ruess, American artist, poet, and writer
- Everett S. Sherman, covered bridge builder
- Everett Shinn, American realist painter
- Everett Spruce, American painter
- Everett Titcomb, American organist and composer
- Everett True, American musician and journalist
- Everett Warner, American impressionist painter
- Everett Woods, architect

== Business ==
- Everett M. Arnold, comic book publisher
- Everett Klipp, stock trader
- Everett F. Merrill, American businessman and city manager
- Everett Nordstrom, American businessman, chairman and CEO
- Everett Stern, American businessman and whistleblower

== Film and television ==
- Everett Brown, American actor
- Everett De Roche, American-Australian screenwriter
- Everett Douglas, American film editor
- Everett Freeman, American screenwriter and producer
- Everett Glass, American character actor
- Everett Greenbaum, American television and film writer and actor
- Everett Eugene Grunz, birthname of American actor E. G. Marshall
- Edward Everett Horton, American actor
- Everett Lewis, American filmmaker
- Everett McGill, American actor
- Everett Sloane, American character actor

== Government, politics, and religion ==
- Everett O. Alldredge, American archivist
- Everett Chamberlin Benton, Massachusetts politician
- Everett Bidwell, Wisconsin politician
- Everett E. Bierman, United States Ambassador
- Everett E. Bolle, member of the Wisconsin State Assembly
- Everett H. Brant, North Dakota politician
- Everett Brown (politician), New York politician
- Everett Ellis Briggs, American diplomat
- Everett Francis Briggs, miner's activist
- Everett G. Burkhalter, California politician
- Everett A. Carpenter, former member of the New York State Assembly
- Everett Colby, New Jersey politician
- Everett R. Combs, American politician from Virginia
- Everett Dirksen, American politician
- Everett E. Dow, member of the Wisconsin State Assembly
- Everett F. Drumright, United States Ambassador
- Everett Dunn, civil engineer and labor negotiator
- Everett Eissenstat, American government official and businessman
- Everett Gendler, American rabbi and civil rights advocate
- Everett S. Graffeo, former Presiding Patriarch
- Everett E. Hatcher, American Drug Enforcement Administration agent
- Everett Hindley, Canadian politician
- Everett Inbody, former judge of the Nebraska Court of Appeals
- Everett Johnson, former member of the Kansas House of Representatives
- Everett Holland Jones, Bishop of West Texas
- B. Everett Jordan, United States senator from North Carolina
- Everett Kelly, former member of the Florida House of Representatives
- Everett Kent, Pennsylvania politician
- C. Everett Koop, Surgeon General of the United States
- Everett J. Lake, Connecticut politician
- Everett LaFond, former member of the Wisconsin Senate
- Everett McBride, former member of the New Hampshire House of Representatives
- Everett McDonald, Canadian politician
- E. H. McEachren, Arizona politician
- Everett J. Murphy, Illinois politician
- Everett Newcomb, Canadian politician
- Everett Osmond, Canadian politician
- Everett Parker, activist and minister
- Everett R. Peters (1894–1972), American farmer and politician
- Everett Piper, conservative commentator and former university president
- Everett Sanders, American political figure
- Everett P. Wheeler, anti-suffrage activist
- Everett Irvine Wood, Canadian politician
- Everett Riley York, law clerk and Washington politician

== Military ==
- Everett W. Anderson, American Civil War soldier
- Everett Alvarez Jr., former United States Navy officer
- Everett Russell Bailey, United States Army physician
- Everett Ernest Blakely, United States Air Force pilot
- Everett Richard Cook, United States Army/Air Force pilot
- Everett W. Holstrom, United States Army Air Forces pilot
- Everett Hughes (United States Army officer), 17th U.S. Army Chief of Ordnance
- Everett F. Larson, United States Marine killed in action and ship namesake
- Everett P. Pope, United States Marine
- Everett W. Stewart, United States Army/Air Force pilot

== Scientists and scholars ==
- Everett Smith Beneke, American mycologist
- Everett L. Bull, American computer scientist
- Everett C. Dade, mathematician
- Everett Fahy, American art historian
- Everett Ferguson, American Christian studies scholar
- Everett Fox, Judaic and Bible studies professor
- Everett L. Fullam, Priest and biblical scholar
- Everett Peter Greenberg, American microbiologist
- Everett Carll Ladd, American political scientist
- Everett Franklin Lindquist, American education professor
- Everett Joel Hall, professor and businessman
- Everett Hall, American philosopher
- Everett F. Harrison, American theologian
- Everett Hughes (sociologist), American sociologist
- Everett Dean Martin, American social psychologist and philosopher
- Everett Mendelsohn, American science historian
- Everett T. Moore, American librarian
- Everett C. Olson, American zoologist
- E. F. Phillips, American beekeeper
- Everett Reimer, education theorist
- Everett Rogers, American communication theorist and sociologist
- Everett K. Rowson, American Middle Eastern and Islamic studies professor
- Everett L. Shostrom, American psychotherapist
- Everett Shock, American geochemist
- Everett E. Vokes, American oncologist
- Everett J. Waring, American attorney
- Everett Worthington, clinical psychologist and professor

== Sports ==
- Everett Bacon, American college football quarterback
- Everett Bowman, American rodeo cowboy
- Everett Bradley (athlete), American pentathlete
- Everett B. Camp, American football player and coach
- Everett Case, American basketball coach
- Everett Dawkins, American football defensive tackle
- Everett Dean, American college basketball and baseball coach
- Everett Dunklee, American cross-country skier
- Everett Ellis, American decathlon athlete
- Everett Fitzhugh, American sports broadcaster
- Everett Gay, American former football player
- Everett Golson, former American football quarterback
- Everett Kell, birth name of American baseball player Skeeter Kell
- Everett E. Kelley, American college football player
- Everett Lindsay, American football player
- Everett Little, American football player
- Everett McGowan, American ice hockey player
- Everett McIver, American former football player
- Everett McLeod, Maine politician
- Everett T. Moore, footballer
- Everett Nelson, Negro league baseball pitcher
- Everett Sanipass, Canadian retired ice hockey forward
- Everett Scott, American professional baseball player
- Everett Strupper, American football player
- Everett Stull, American former baseball pitcher
- Everett Sweeley, American football player and coach
- Everett Teaford, American former baseball pitcher
- Everett Withers, American football coach
- Everett Whittingham, Jamaican cricketer
- Everett Yon, American football player and coach

== Fictional characters ==
- Everett Acker, a character from Better Call Saul
- Everett K. Ross, character in Marvel Comics
- Everett Thomas, alter ego of Marvel Comics character Synch
- Everett Young, a Stargate Universe character

== Others ==
- Everett Bridgewater, bankrobber
- Everett C. Erle, American philatelist
- Everett Farmer, Canadian murderer
- Everett Klippert, last person convicted of gross indecency for homosexual behavior in Canada
- Edward Everett Brown (1858–1919) American lawyer, author, civil rights activist

== See also ==
- Everett (surname)
- Everette
- Everett (disambiguation)
