= Aberhart =

Aberhart is a surname. Notable people with the surname include:

- Denis Aberhart (born 1953), New Zealand former first class cricketer
- Laurence Aberhart (born 1949), New Zealand photographer
- Wayne Aberhart (born 1958), New Zealand cricketer
- William Aberhart (1878–1943), Canadian politician and seventh Premier of Alberta

== See also ==
- William Aberhart High School
- Eberhart (disambiguation)
