= Rev =

Rev, REV or Rév may refer to:

== Abbreviations ==
=== Rev. ===
- Rev., an abbreviation for revolution, as in Revolutions per minute
- Rev., an abbreviation for the religious style The Reverend
- Rev., the abbreviation for Runtime Revolution, a development environment
- Rev., an abbreviation for the Book of Revelation
- Rev., an abbreviation for Reverse
- Rev., an abbreviation for Revision
- Rev., an abbreviation for Revolver
- Rev., an abbreviation for Review, as in:
  - Chem. Rev. (Chemical Reviews), a peer-reviewed scientific journal
  - Phys. Rev. (Physical Review), an American scientific journal

=== Revs ===
- Revs (video game), a 1984 Formula Three simulation computer game
- Revs (graffiti artist), tag name of a graffiti artist in New York City
- The Revs, an Irish rock band
- Revs, the nickname for the New England Revolution soccer club in America

== Acronyms ==
- REV Bremerhaven, a professional hockey team in Germany's 2nd Bundesliga league
- REV (Conference), the International Conference on Remote Engineering and Virtual Instrumentation
- Iomega REV, a removable disk storage system
- Range-extended vehicle
- Redlands East Valley High School
- Regulator of Virion, a protein of HIV
- Representative elementary volume
- Revised English Version, an Internet Bible version by Spirit & Truth Fellowship International 2012
- Réseau Express Vélo, a network of bicycle lanes in Montreal
- Robotic Enhanced Vehicles (R.E.V.), a toy sold by WowWee

== Companies ==
- Rev (company), a speech-to-text and captioning company
- Revlon, an American multinational cosmetics, skin care, fragrance, and personal care company
- REV Group, an American manufacturer of specialty vehicles
- Equalize Health, formerly D-Rev, a non-profit product development company

== Music ==
- Rev-Ola Records, a UK record label formed in 1988
- Rev (Perry Farrell album), 1999
- Rev (Ten Foot Pole album), 1994
- Rev (Ultra Vivid Scene album), 1992
- Rev (The Reverend Horton Heat album), 2014

== People ==
- Rev I of Iberia (died 216), king of (Caucasian) Iberia (i.e., eastern Georgia)
- Rev II of Iberia (4th century), a prince who functioned as a co-king to his father Mirian III, the first Christian Georgian ruler
- Rev Cannady (1904–1981), baseball player in the Negro leagues
- Lívia Rév (1916–2018), classical concert pianist
- Martin Rev (born 1947), instrumentalist from New York punk-era electronic band Suicide
- The Rev (James Owen Sullivan, 1981–2009), drummer for the band Avenged Sevenfold
- Joseph Simmons, better known as Rev Run, of Run-DMC

== Other uses ==
- Rev (comics), a Marvel Comics supervillain
- Rev (drink), an alcopop
- Rev (HIV), an HIV gene
- Rev. (TV series), a BBC sitcom (2010–2014) about an inner-city priest
- Rev Bem, a fictional character in the television series Gene Roddenberry's Andromeda
- Rev limiter, a device attached to an internal combustion engine
- Rev, a type of semantic link
- Rév, the Hungarian name for Vadu Crișului Commune, Bihor County, Romania
- REV, the product code used by Nintendo for Wii hardware and software, a reference to the platform's prototype name of Revolution
- Ram 1500 REV, a range-extended plug-in hybrid truck
- G.rev, a Japanese arcade videogame developer
- Horns Rev, a shallow area in the eastern North Sea
- Şəlvə, Khojali, or Rev, a village in the Republic of Artsakh de facto (Azerbaijan de jure)
- Resident Evil Veronica

== See also ==
- Rav, an honorific title
- Reverse (disambiguation)
- Reverend (disambiguation)
- Revolution (disambiguation)
- Revolve (disambiguation)
