= Everett Township, Nebraska =

Everett Township, Nebraska may refer to the following places:

- Everett Township, Burt County, Nebraska
- Everett Township, Dodge County, Nebraska

== See also ==
- Everett Township (disambiguation)
