= Evert =

- Pronunciation: Dutch: [eˈvert] Swedish: [eˈvert] Finnish: [eˈvert] Icelandic: [ehˈvert] Norwegian: [ehˈvert]
- Gender: Male

Origin
- Origin: Dutch, Swedish, Icelandic, Finnish, Norwegian
- Meaning: brave as a boar, hardy

Other names
- See also: Everett, Everhard, Eberhard

Evert is a Dutch and Nordic short form of the Germanic masculine name "Everhard" (alternative Eberhard). The Germanic meaning is brave as a boar. The Finnish spelling is Eevert. The diminutive form is Eef. The English variant is Everett. The related surname is Everts.

Notable people with the name include:

== Given name ==
- Evert van Aelst (1602–1657), Dutch still life painter
- Evert Andersen (1772–1809), Norwegian naval officer
- Evert Augustus Duyckinck (1816–1878), American publisher and biographer
- Evert Azimullah (born 1938), Surinamese diplomat, politician, and writer
- Evert Båge (1925–2021), Swedish Air Force major general
- Evert Jan Baerends (born 1945), Dutch theoretical chemist
- Evert Bancker (mayor) (1665–1734), New Netherland/New York trader and politician
- Evert Bancker (speaker) (1721–1803), New York merchant and politician
- Evert Basch
- Evert Bastet (born 1950), Canadian sailor
- Evert van Benthem (born 1958), Dutch speed skater
- Evert Willem Beth (1908–1964), Dutch philosopher and logician
- Evert Björn (1888–1974), Swedish middle-distance runner
- Evert Bloemsma (1958–2005), Dutch type designer and graphic designer
- Evert Jan Boks (1838–1914), Dutch painter
- Evert Jan Brill (1812–1871), Dutch publisher
- Evert Brouwers (born 1990), Dutch footballer
- Evert Jan Bulder (1894–1973), Dutch footballer
- Evert Collier (1642–1708), Dutch painter
- Evert Dolman (1946–1993), Dutch racing cyclist
- Evert Dudok (born 1959), Dutch engineer and CEO
- Evert Eloranta (1879–1936), Finnish politician
- Evert Endt (born 1933), Dutch-born French designer
- Evert Geradts (born 1943), Dutch cartoonist
- Evert Grift (1922–2009), Dutch racing cyclist
- Evert Groenewald (fl. 1963–1999), South African Navy officer
- Evert Gunnarsson (1929–2022), Swedish rower
- Evert Hingst (1969–2005), Dutch lawyer and murder victim
- Evert Hoek (born 1933), South African-Canadian civil engineer
- Evert-Jan 't Hoen (born 1975), Dutch baseball player
- Evert Hokkanen (1864–1918), Finnish farmworker and politician
- Evert Horn (1585–1615), Swedish soldier
- Evert Hoving (born 1953), Dutch middle-distance runner
- Evert Huttunen (1884–1924), Finnish journalist and politician
- Evert Jakobsson (1886–1960), Finnish javelin thrower
- Evert Johansson (1903–1990), Finnish canoeist
- Evert Kamerbeek (1934–2008), Dutch decathlete
- Evert Karlsson (1920–1996), Swedish ski jumper
- Evert Koops (1885–1938), Dutch sprinter
- Evert Kroes (born 1950), Dutch rower
- Evert Kroon (1946–2018), Dutch water polo goalkeeper
- Evert Johan Kroon (born 1966), Netherlands Antilles swimmer
- Evert Kulenius (1879–1958), Finnish schoolteacher and politician
- Evert Larock (1865–1901), Belgian painter
- Évert Lengua (born 1983), Peruvian footballer
- Evert van Linge (1895–1964), Dutch footballer
- Evert Lundquist (1904–1994), Swedish painter and graphic artist
- Evert Lundqvist (1900–1979), Swedish footballer
- Evert van Milligen (born 1948), Dutch VVD politician
- Evert Musch (1918–2007), Dutch painter
- Evert van Muyden (1853–1922), Swiss engraver, illustrator and painter
- Evert Nilsson (1894–1973), Swedish pentathlete and decathlete
- Evert Nyberg (1925–2000), Swedish long-distance runner
- Evert Oudendijck (1650–1695), Dutch painter
- Evert Pieters (1856–1932), Dutch painter
- Evert Ploeg (born 1963), Australian portrait painter.
- Evert Skoglund (born 1953), Italian footballer
- Evert V. Snedecker (1838–1899), American racing horse trainer and owner
- Evert Sodergren (1920–2013), American studio furniture maker
- Evert Svensson (1925–2024), Swedish sociologist and politician
- Evert Sparks (1879–1972), Canadian (Alberta) politician
- Evert Taube (1890–1976), Swedish author, artist, composer and singer
- Evert Verbist (born 1984), Belgian road cyclist
- Evert Verwey (1905–1981), Dutch chemist
- Evert Ysbrandszoon Ides (1657–1708), Danish traveller and diplomat

== Surname ==
- Alexei Evert (1857–1926), General in the Russian Empire
- Angelos Evert (1894–1970), Greek police officer
- Chris Evert (born 1954), American tennis player
  - Evert Cup, women's tennis tournament named after her
  - Chris Evert (horse), racing horse named after her
- James Evert (1924–2015), American tennis coach, father of Chris and Jeanne
- Jason Evert (born 1975), Catholic author and chastity speaker
- Jeanne Evert (1957–2020), American tennis player
- Miltiadis Evert (1939–2011), Greek politician.

== See also ==
- Ebert
- Everett (given name)
- Everts (surname)
