= Everett =

Everett may refer to:

== Places ==
=== Canada ===
- Everett, Ontario, a community in Adjala–Tosorontio, Simcoe County
- Everett Mountains, a range on southern Baffin Island in Nunavut

=== United States ===
- Everett, Massachusetts, in Middlesex County, Massachusetts north of Boston
- Everett, Missouri, an unincorporated community
- Everett, Nebraska, an unincorporated community
- Everett, New Jersey, an unincorporated community
- Everett, Ohio, an unincorporated community
- Everett, Pennsylvania, in Bedford County, Pennsylvania
  - Everett Area School District, a public school district in Bedford Country.
- Everett, Washington, the county seat and largest city in Washington state's Snohomish County
  - Everett Massacre, an armed confrontation between local authorities and members of the Industrial Workers of the World union
  - Boeing Everett Factory, an airplane assembly building owned by Boeing
- Everett Township (disambiguation), a list of townships named Everett

=== Elsewhere ===
- Everett Range, Antarctica, an ice-covered mountain range in Antarctica

== People ==
- Everett (given name)
- Everett (surname)

== Sports teams ==
- Everett Raptors, a professional indoor football team
- Everett AquaSox, a Minor League Baseball team of Northwest League
- Everett Silvertips, an American major junior ice hockey team

== Other uses ==
- Everett, the Microsoft pre-release codename for Visual Studio .NET 2003
- Everett Piano Company, a defunct piano company
- Everett Interpretation, another name for the Many-worlds interpretation
- Everett Railroad, a shortline and heritage railroad
- Everett Turnpike, a toll road in New Hampshire

== Machinery - City of Everett ==
- N7470 or the City of Everett, the first flight-worthy Boeing 747-100 airliner
- SS City of Everett, a whaleback steamship best known for being both the first American steamship to pass through the Suez Canal and the first to circumnavigate the globe, the ship was launched in 1894 and foundered in the Gulf of Mexico in October 1923

== See also ==
- Everette (disambiguation)
- Everitt, an American automobile manufactured from 1909 to 1912 by the E-M-F Company (Everitt-Metzger-Flanders)
- Evert (disambiguation)
