= Evertz (surname) =

Evertz is a surname of German and Dutch origin. It is a patronymic name derived from the personal name Everhard or Evert, meaning "son of Evert." Notable people with the name include:

- Carlo Evertz (born 1990), Belgian footballer
- Gabriele Evertz (born 1945), German-American painter
- Scott Evertz, American PR adviser
- Theodor Evertz (fl. c. 1554), Franco-Flemish composer

== See also ==
- Evertz (disambiguation)
