= Inversion =

Inversion or inversions may refer to:

== Arts ==
- Inversion (artwork), a 2005 temporary sculpture in Houston, Texas
- Inversion (music), a term with various meanings in music theory and musical set theory
- Inversions (novel) by Iain M. Banks
- Inversion (video game), a 2012 third person shooter for Xbox 360, PlayStation 3, and PC
- Inversions (EP), the 2014 extended play album by American rock music ensemble The Colourist
- Inversions (album), a 2019 album by Belinda O'Hooley
- Inversion (film), a 2016 Iranian film

== Linguistics and language ==
- Inversion (linguistics), grammatical constructions where two expressions switch their order of appearance
- Inversion (prosody), the reversal of the order of a foot's elements in poetry
- Anastrophe, a figure of speech also known as an inversion

== Mathematics and logic ==
- Additive inverse
- Involution (mathematics), a function that is its own inverse (when applied twice, the starting value is obtained)
- Inversion (discrete mathematics), any item that is out of order in a sequence
- Inverse element
- Inverse function, a function that undoes the operation of another function.
- Inversive geometry#Circle inversion, a transformation of the Euclidean plane that maps generalized circles to generalized circles
- Inversion in a point, or point reflection, a kind of isometric (distance-preserving) transformation in a Euclidean space
- Inversion transformation, a conformal transformation (one which preserves angles of intersection)
- Method of inversion, the image of a harmonic function in a sphere (or plane); see Method of image charges
- Multiplicative inverse, the reciprocal of a number (or any other type of element for which a multiplication function is defined)
- Matrix inversion, an operation on a matrix that results in its multiplicative inverse
- Model inversion
- Set inversion

== Natural sciences ==
=== Biology and medicine ===
- Inversion (evolutionary biology), a hypothesis about the evolution of the dorsoventral axis in animals
- Inversion (kinesiology), movement of the sole towards the median plane
- Chromosomal inversion, where a segment of a chromosome is reversed end-to-end
- Inversion therapy, the practice of hanging upside down (heart higher than head) for supposed health benefits

=== Geology ===
- Inversion (geology), the relative uplift of a previously basinal area resulting from local shortening, in structural geology
- Quartz inversion, a change in the crystal structure of quartz at high temperatures
- Relief inversion, when a previous depression becomes a landform that stands out from its surroundings
- Seismic inversion, transforming seismic reflection data into a quantitative rock-property description of a geological formation

=== Physics and chemistry ===
- Island of inversion, a group of elements with abnormal nuclear shell structure
- Nitrogen inversion, a chemical process in which a trigonal nitrogen-containing structure turns inside-out
- Population inversion, in statistical mechanics, when a system exists in state with more members in an excited state than in lower-energy states
- Pyramidal inversion, a chemical process in which a trigonal structure turns inside-out
- Inverted sugar syrup, a chemical reaction converting sucrose into glucose and fructose

=== Other uses in the natural sciences ===
- Inverse problem, the process of calculating from a set of observations the causal factors that produced them
- Inversion (meteorology), air temperature increasing with height

== Other uses ==
- Priority inversion, the condition of a low-priority task holding a shared resource that a high-priority task needs
- Inversion in postcolonial theory, a discursive strategy/gesture in cultural and subaltern studies
- Roller coaster inversion, which turns riders upside-down
- Tax inversion, a form of tax avoidance by moving corporate ownership to low-tax nations

== See also ==
- Inverse (disambiguation)
- Inverter (disambiguation)
- Sexual inversion (disambiguation)
- Involution (disambiguation)
- Eversion (disambiguation)
- Reversal (disambiguation)
