= McCorvey =

McCorvey is a surname. Notable people with the surname include:

- Everett McCorvey, American classical tenor, teacher, impresario, conductor, and producer
- Kez McCorvey (born 1972), American football player
- Norma McCorvey (1947–2017), American activist
- Woody McCorvey, American football coach and administrator
