= Malinovo Castle =

Historic site in Slovakia

- Eberhard
- Malinovo, Bratislava Region, Slovakia
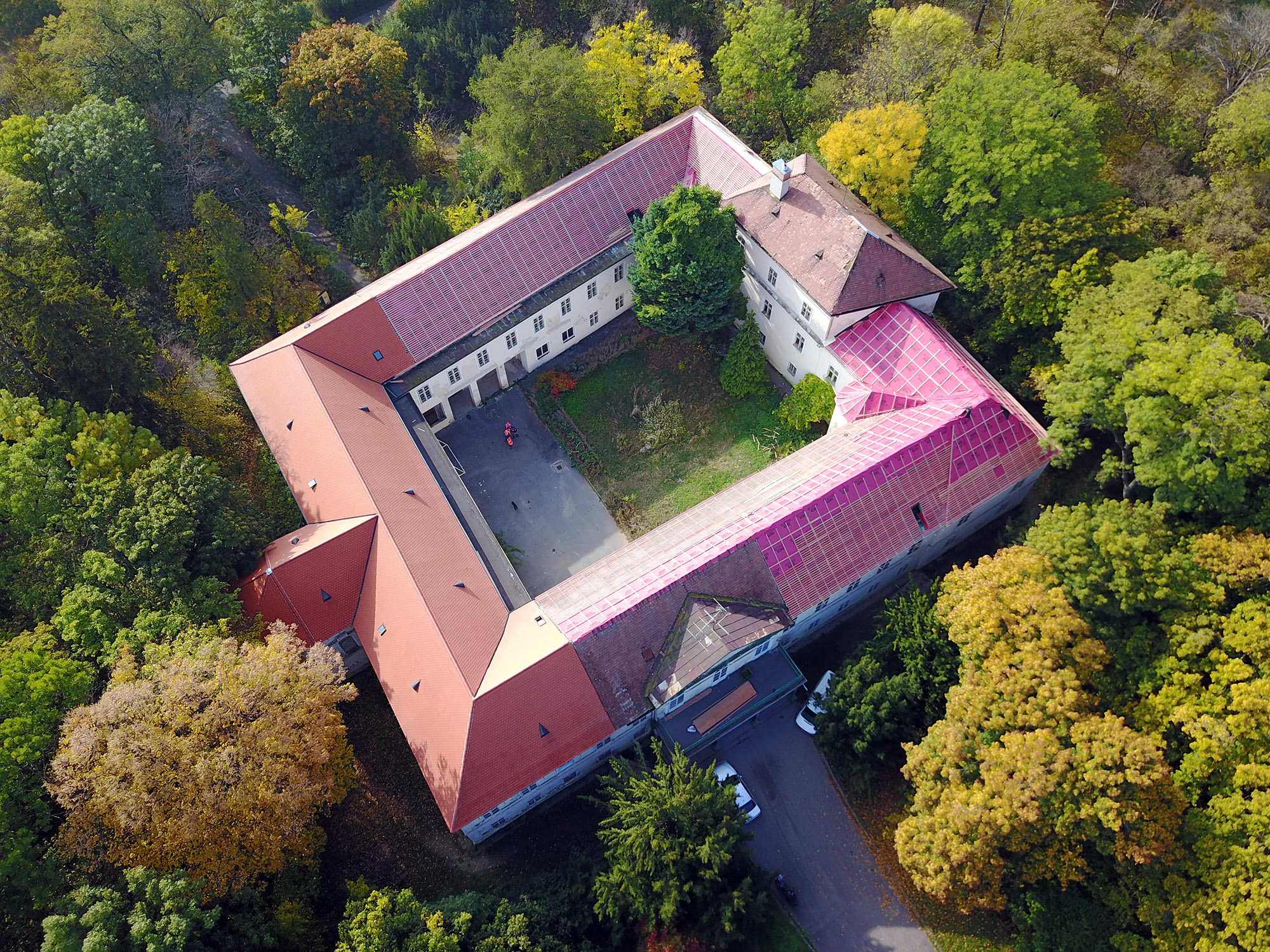
- Ariel view of the castle

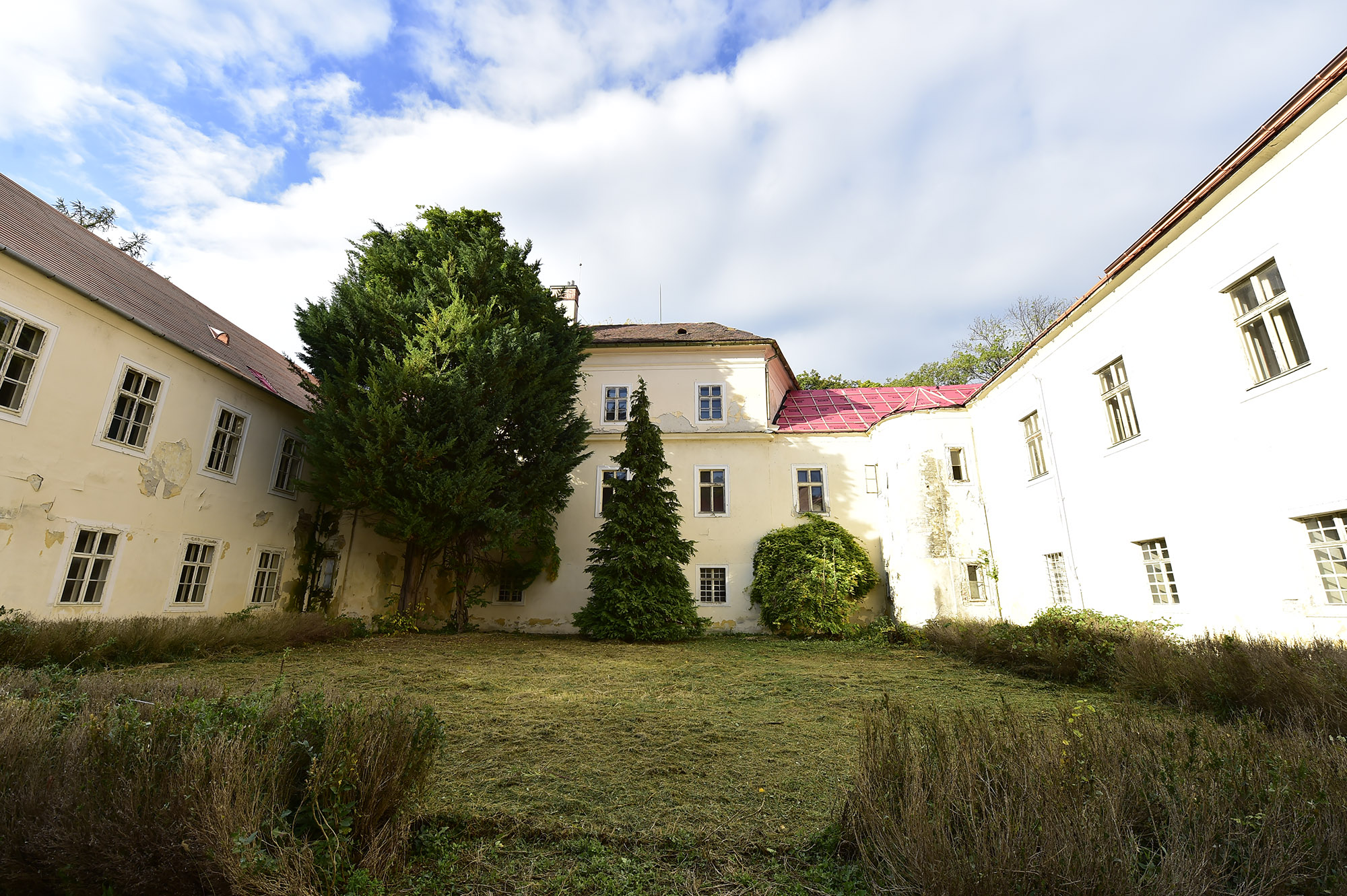
- Within the manor

Site information
- Type: Castle

Location
- Coordinates: 48.152778°N 17.2975°E

Malinovo Castle, also referred to as Eberhard, is a mansion in the village of Malinovo in the Bratislava Region of Slovakia. The classicist-style building was rebuilt from a former moated castle.

The castle was first mentioned in 1209. The estate belonged to the counts of Svätý Jur and Pezinok. After 1677, the water castle was rebuilt into a Renaissance mansion with a chapel, while the moat has been partially preserved to this day. In the 19th century, the four-story building was rebuilt by the Aponi family and the mansion took on its current appearance. It currently houses the Gustáv Čejku Associated Secondary School of Horticulture. There is an English park from the 19th century on the premises.

== Names and etymology ==
The original name comes from a Germanic personal name Eberhardt. The earliest mentions are Yberhart (1209), Ybrehart (1216), Eburhardi (1260). In 1946, the castle was renamed to Malinvovo after the village changed its name in honor of Soviet Marshal Rodion Malinovsky.

== Description ==
The building is a four-wing, two-story structure with semicircular extensions at the corners. It was built on the foundations of a medieval fortress, still partly visible today, surrounded by a moat. The manor features a central courtyard known for its excellent acoustics. Above the entrance gate, supported by four columns, is a terrace with a triangular tympanum. Its current appearance dates from a 19th-century Classicist renovation.

The interior was adapted for use as a gardening school, retaining features such as coats of arms of Archbishop Szelepcsényi and early Baroque stucco mascarons. In 2010, the school moved out, and the manor has been largely vacant since, except for a brief period in 2014 when it was used as a filming location for the series "Secret Lives". In June 2017, restoration work began, including roof repairs and replacement.

== History ==
The original castle was likely built between 1344 and 1385. The estate belonged to the counts of Svätý Jur and Pezinok. It was conquered by the Moravian Margrave Prokop, who aided his relatives in gaining the Hungarian throne. After his departure, the castle's ownership was divided among various noble families, including Sv. Jura, Pezina, Mérey, Pálffy, Balassa, Pázmány, Hederváry, and Forgách. In the 17th century, Archbishop Juraj Szelepcsényi acquired the estate and transformed the castle into a late Renaissance fortress with defensive moats, supporting Habsburg interests and anti-Reformation efforts. In the 19th century, the Counts of Apponyi acquired the property, rebuilding it into a neoclassical country house surrounded by a park. The estate served as their main seat until the early 20th century. After the founding of Czechoslovakia, the manor was repurposed as a horticultural school, operating until 2010 when the school relocated.

== Findings ==
During renovations in 2026, archaeologists uncovered various artifacts and building materials from the medieval era. These include brick fragments called fingernails, ceramic shards, remains of roofing, plaster, mortar, as well as metal items like crossbow arrowheads, a key, and numerous nails. A portion of the finds consists of stone architectural elements likely originating from the original castle structures. Most discoveries were made near the moat and the remains of an uncovered bridge, which probably dates to the Renaissance period.

== See also ==
- List of castles in Slovakia
