= Everts =

Everts may refer to:

== Places ==
- Everts, California
- Everts Township, Minnesota
- Mount Everts, Wyoming

== Other uses ==
- Everts (surname), including a list of people with the name
- Everts Air, airline based in Fairbanks, Alaska

== See also ==
- Evert (disambiguation)
- Eversion (disambiguation)
