= Inversion operator =

Inversion operator may refer to:

- Inversion operator, the operator that assigns the inverse element to an element of a group
- Inversion in a point
- Chromosomal inversion, the reordering of genes in a DNA-sequence

== See also ==
- Inversion (disambiguation)
