= Everette =

Everette is the name of:

== Given name ==
- Everette Brown (born 1987), American football linebacker
- Everette Lee DeGolyer (1886–1956), Dallas oilman, geophysicist and philanthropist
- Everette Harp (born 1961), blues, jazz, and gospel performer
- Everette B. Howard (1873–1950), U.S. Representative from Oklahoma
- Everette Howard Hunt (1918–2007), American author and spy known by E. Howard Hunt
- Everette Maddox (1944–1989), New Orleans poet
- Everette Stephens (born 1966), American basketball player

== Surname ==
- Daylen Everette (born 2004), American football player
- Leon Everette (born 1948), American country music artist

== See also ==
- Everett (disambiguation)
- Everett (surname)
- Everett (given name)
