= Frederick Eberhardt =

Frederick Eberhardt may refer to:

- Frederick Eberhardt (philanthropist) (1868–1946), American engineer, philanthropist, university administrator and president of Gould & Eberhardt
- Frederick Eberhardt (philosopher) (born 1978), American philosopher
