= INV =

INV may refer to:

- Inverter (logic gate)
- Inverness Airport, IATA airport code
- Inverness railway station, Scotland; National Rail station code INV
- Inverness-shire, county in Scotland, Chapman code
- Irish National Volunteers
- Inverse (mathematics)
- Invected (Drosophila melanogaster gene)
