= Inverter (disambiguation) =

A power inverter is a device that converts direct current to alternating current.

Inverter may also refer to

- Inverter (logic gate) or NOT gate, a device that performs a logical operation
- Inverter air conditioner, a type of air conditioner that uses a power inverter to vary the speed of the compressor motor to continuously regulate temperature
- Impedance inverter, a device that produces the mathematical inverse of an electrical impedance—see Quarter-wave impedance transformer

== See also ==
- Inverse (disambiguation)
- Inversion (disambiguation)
- Rectifier
- Thyristor
- HVDC converter station - A device that converts AC power to and from high voltage DC
