= Reversion =

Reversion may refer to:

- Conversion to Islam, also called reversion
- Reversion (2012 film), an animated short film
- Reversion (2015 film), an American science fiction thriller film
- Reversion (genetics), a back mutation
- Reversion (law)
- Reversion (software development)
- Series reversion, in mathematics

== See also ==
- Reversal (disambiguation)
- Reverse (disambiguation)
- Reversis, a card-game
- Reverted (film), a 1994 film
