= Everts (surname) =

Everts is a North German and Dutch surname, a patronymic from Evert. Notable people with the name include:

- Carmen Everts (born 1968), German civil servant
- Clint Everts (born 1984), American baseball player
- George Everts (born 1842), American politician
- Harry Everts (born 1952), Belgian motocross racer
- Kellie Everts (born 1945), American stripper, bodybuilder, church founder
- Liam Everts (born 2004), Belgian motocross racer
- Orpheus Everts (1826–1903), American physician, writer
- Sabine Everts (born 1961), German heptathlete
- Sheri Everts, American academic
- Stefan Everts (born 1972), Belgian motocross racer
- Thomas H. Everts (1835–1925), American physician, politician, and newspaper editor
- Truman C. Everts (1816–1901), American explorer

== See also ==
- Everts (disambiguation)
