= Inverse =

Inverse or invert may refer to:

== Science and mathematics ==
- Inverse (logic), a type of conditional sentence which is an immediate inference made from another conditional sentence
- Additive inverse, the inverse of a number that, when added to the original number, yields zero
- Compositional inverse, a function that "reverses" another function
- Inverse element
- Inverse function, a function that "reverses" another function
  - Generalized inverse, a matrix that has some properties of the inverse matrix but not necessarily all of them
- Multiplicative inverse (reciprocal), a number which when multiplied by a given number yields the multiplicative identity, 1
  - Inverse matrix of an Invertible matrix

== Other uses ==
- Invert level, the base interior level of a pipe, trench or tunnel
- Inverse (website), an online magazine
- An outdated term for an LGBT person; see Sexual inversion (sexology)

== See also ==
- Inversion (disambiguation)
- Inverter (disambiguation)
- Opposite (disambiguation)
- Reverse (disambiguation)
- Complement (disambiguation)
