= Reverse =

Reverse or reversing may refer to:

== Arts and media ==
- Reverse (Eldritch album), 2001
- Reverse (Morandi album), 2005
- Reverse (2009 film), a Polish comedy-drama film
- Reverse (2019 film), an Iranian crime-drama film
- Reverse (2017 TV series), a South Korean family melodrama revenge television series
- Reverse (2026 TV series), an upcoming South Korean mystery revenge thriller television series
- "Reverse", a 2014 song by SomeKindaWonderful
- "Reverse", a 2026 song by MNEK
- REVERSE art gallery, in Brooklyn, NY, US
- Reverse tape effects including backmasking, the recording of sound in reverse
- Reversing: Secrets of Reverse Engineering, a book by Eldad Eilam
- Tegami Bachi: REVERSE, the second season of the Tegami Bachi anime series, 2010

== Driving ==
- Reverse gear, in a motor or mechanical transmission
- Reversing (vehicle maneuver), reversing the direction of a vehicle
- Turning a vehicle through 180 degrees

== Sports and games ==
- Reverse (American football), a trick play in American football
- Reverse swing, a cricket delivery
- Reverse (bridge), a type of bid in contract bridge

== Technology ==
- Reverse engineering, a process of determining design from a finished product
- Reverse gear, in a motor or mechanical transmission
  - Reversing gear of a steam locomotive
- Reverse lookup, using a value to retrieve a unique key in an associative array
  - Reverse telephone directory
  - Reverse DNS lookup
- Reverse tape effects including backmasking, the recording of sound in reverse
- Thrust reversal, the reversing of a jet engine's thrust direction
- Reversing type, a method to highlight a piece of text in printing
- Reverse charging, charging from a typically charge receive-only device
  - Reverse wireless charging
  - Vehicle-to-load (V2L)
    - Vehicle-to-vehicle (V2V)

== Other uses ==
- Obverse and reverse, the two faces of objects such as coins, paper money, medals and fabrics

== See also ==
- Auto-reverse
- Reversal (disambiguation)
- Reversion (disambiguation)
- Revers, display of reverse side of jacket cuffs, etc.
- Reversi, board game
- Reverxe, album
