= Everett Township =

Everett Township is the name of the following places within the United States:

- Everett Township, Michigan, in Newaygo County
- Everett Township, Burt County, Nebraska
- Everett Township, Dodge County, Nebraska

== See also ==
- Everett (disambiguation)
