= Tina Marais =

Canadian textile artist from Cape Town, South Africa

- Born: 23 August 1977 (age 49); Cape Town, South Africa
- Occupation: Textile artist
- Parents: Evert Groenewald (father); Retha Groenewald (mother)

Tina Marais (born 23 August 1977) is a Canadian textile artist. She is known for her 3-dimensional fabric and mixed media sculptures as well as her cultural mediation projects.

== Biography ==
Marais attended the Open Window Art Academy in Pretoria, South Africa from 1996 to 1999, where she earned two diplomas: one in fine arts, and one in visual communication with a fine art specialization.

In 2008, Marais moved to Canada with her family, settling first in Ontario before settling in Quebec in 2011. She lives and works in the greater Montreal region. In 2022, she earned a Masters Degree in Fibre and Material Practices from Concordia University in Montreal.

== Career ==
Marais has been interested in textiles since early childhood. She has been drawn to textiles due to their variety of textures and colours, their ability to capture movement, and their accessibility as a medium.

Marais' work focuses on diversity, integration, human impacts on the environment, social transformation and immigration. She tries to capture flow, or the element of change within her work. Marais' fascination with movement created by the wind, and the sea, began as a child in South Africa. Human displacement and human environmental degradation are viewed by her in the same flow lines as the wind and sea. A part of her interest in migration and refugees she relates to her own migration from South Africa to Canada.

=== Cultural mediation projects ===
Marais has been involved in various cultural mediation projects throughout the greater Montreal region supported by the municipalities there.

==== La Danse des Mains (the Dance of the Hands) ====
Sculpture inside Salle Pauline Julien, 15615 Boul Gouin O, Sainte-Geneviève, QC, 2019

307 participants, including adult students in francization at Cégep Gérald-Godin, special education classes from the Marguerite-Bourgeoys School and l'école Secondaire Saint-George worked alongside Struthers making hands out of wire that were then covered in tissue paper. These hands were turned into two large multi-pronged pretzel shapes. Inspired by her own isolation when moving to Quebec without speaking French, Struthers worked with others to whom body language was needed for communication. This bodily communication is represented by the Dance of the Hands.

==== Ligne's d'eau ====
interior textile wall installations and one outdoor sculpture, 2018–2019,
2017 Quebec flood victims were invited to participate and create works that used the idea of water lines as a starting point. Yarn and copper symbolizing the danger of raising water and electricity were used. The project encompassed six locations. textile installation inside the community centre: 394 Rue Main, Hudson, QC outside sculpture corner of Chemin des Cheneaux, and Boul. De La Cité-Des-Jeunes, Vaudreuil-Dorion, QC, textile installation inside the town hall, 44 Rue de l'Église, Vaudreuil-sur-le-Lac, QC textile installation inside the Library 102 Rue Saint-Pierre, Rigaud, QC textile installation inside the community centre, 74, 7e Avenue Terrasse-Vaudreuil, QC textile installation inside the community centre, 694 rue Tisseur, Pointe-Fortune, QC

==== Je m'attache a la culture (I am attached to the Culture) ====
Sculpture inside 190 Avenue Saint Charles, Vaudreuil-Dorion QC, 2014

Through various public and community events, Marais had over 1500 participants committing to the idea of culture and writing their name on a long thin piece of cloth. These clothes were then sewed into long rolls and placed onto a series of large meandering interlocked circles forming a Gordian Knot that were created out of soft 17" tubing. The finished work was approximately 10 feet long by three feet wide and 7 feet tall.

=== Public Sculptures, from Cultural mediation Projects ===
- Le Flux de L'Or Bleu, textile installation in the Théâtre Paul-Émile Meloche 400 Avenue Saint-Charles, Vaudreuil-Dorion, QC, 2019
- Vibrer Ensemble Sculpture is outside Centre des Femmes la Moisson,321 Grand Boulevard, L'Île-Perrot, QC, 2019
- Unité dans la Diversité, Sculpture on corner of avenue saint Charles, and Boulevard Harwood autoroute 20, Ville de Vaudreuil-Dorion,2018
- Au Fil des Terres textile installation inside the Regional Municipality Counsel Hall de Vaudreuil-Soulanges, 280 Boulevard Harwood, 2017
- Mon Nid Chez Moi, 23 panel textile installation inside 3031/309 Boulevard de la Gare, Vaudreuil-Dorion QC, 2015
- Plus Haut Plus Loin, suspended sculpture inside City Hall, 2555 Rue Dutrisac, Vaudreuil-Dorion, 2015

=== Public sculptures ===
- Travaillons Ensemble, sculpture on the corner of Avenue Saint charles and rue Paul Gerin-Lajoie, Vaudreuil-Dorion QC, 2016 with Monika Brinkman & Mozaik
- Au Coeur de ma Communauté, outside wall mural, Avenue Saint Charles Vaudreuil-Dorion QC, 2015 with Monica Brinkman.

== Exhibitions ==
=== Selected solo exhibitions ===
- CODEX II, Mary E. Black Gallery, 2020, Halifax, Canada
- CODEX, 2017 Galerie de la Ville, Dollard des Ormeaux, Canada
- Soixante 17, 2017, Musée Régional de Vaudreuil-Soulanges, Canada
- Racines au Carre, 2015, Salle Hélène-Rouette, L'Île-Bizard, Canada

=== Selected group exhibitions ===
- 16th International Triennial of Tapestry, 2019, Łódź, Poland
- Contemporâneo, international textile art exhibition, 2019, Brazil
- WorldTextile Association's International Biennial of Contemporary Textile Art; 2019, Madrid, Spain; 2017, Montevideo, Uruguay
- Scythia, the 12th International Biennial of Contemporary Textile Art, 2018, Ivano-Frankivsk, Ukraine
- The Brain Project, 2017; 2016, Toronto, Canada
- International Textile Biennial 2017, Kunststichting Perspektief vzw, Haacht, Belgium

== Awards ==
- Artiste dans la communauté 2021, Arts Council of Quebec, CALQ, Quebec Canada
- Artist of the Year 1996 Merit Award, Pretoria, South-Africa, South African Art Society
- Honorable mention VII World Textile Art Biennial in Montevideo, 2017
- ideau Partnership Award 2020 for La Danse des Mains
