= Evertz =

Evertz may refer to:

- Evertz (surname), a list of people with the name
- Evertz Technologies – A broadcast equipment manufacturer in Burlington, Ontario
