= Moore v. Younger =

Legal case

- Court: California Court of Appeals
- Full case name: Everett T. Moore et al., Plaintiffs and Appellants, v. Evelle J. Younger, as Attorney General, Defendant and Respondent.
- Decided: January 30, 1976
- Citation: 54 Cal.App.3d 1122; 127 Cal. Rptr. 171

Court membership
- Judges sitting: Otto M. Kaus, Herbert L. Ashby, James H. Hastings

Case opinions
- Decision by: Kaus
- Concurrence: Ashby, Hastings

Keywords
- Censorship; Intellectual freedom

The United States court case of Moore v. Younger, 54 Cal. App. 3d 1122 (Cal. App. 1976) originated from a somewhat ambiguous law, California's Harmful Matter Statute. California Attorney General Evelle J. Younger "claimed that individual librarians could be prosecuted for giving juveniles access to questionable reading materials." University of California, Los Angeles Librarian Everett T. Moore, as plaintiff, challenged the Attorney General through legal action. In February 1976, one month after he retired from UCLA, Moore won his case. All librarians in California were found to be exempt from the Harmful Matter Statute by the California Court of Appeals.
