= Malinovo, Slovakia =

Malinovo Éberhárd
- Municipality
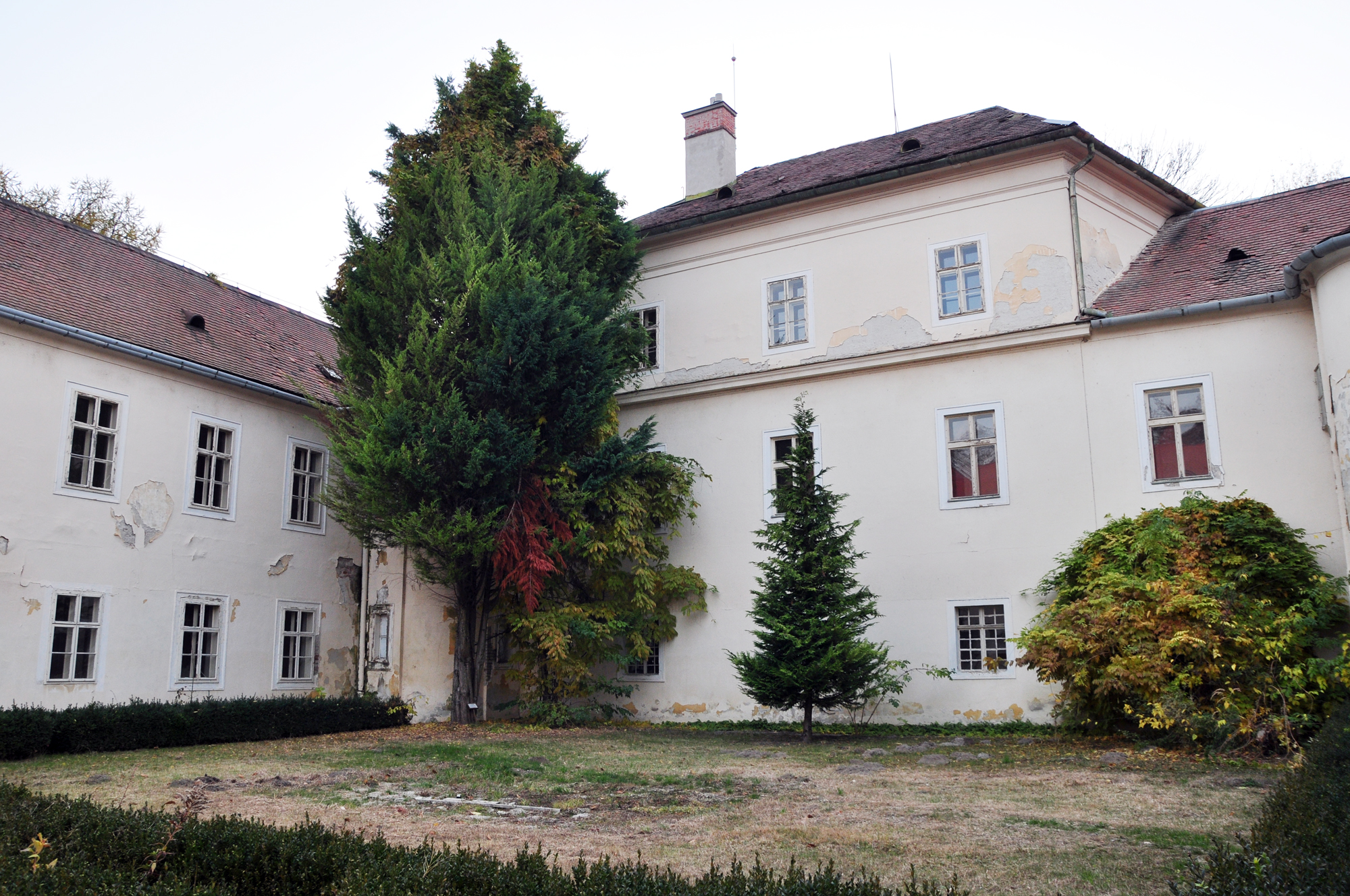
- Court of the Apponyi castle

- Flag

- Location of Malinovo in the Bratislava Region Location of Malinovo in Slovakia
- Coordinates: 48.16°N 17.30°E
- Country: Slovakia
- Region: Bratislava Region
- District: Senec District
- First mentioned: 1209

Government
  - Mayor: Edit Valacsai

Area
  - Total: 8.82 km^{2} (3.41 sq mi)
- Elevation: 129 m (423 ft)

Population (2025)
  - Total: 4,201
- Time zone: UTC+1 (CET)
  - Summer (DST): UTC+2 (CEST)
- Postal code: 900 45
- Area code: +421 16
- Vehicle registration plate (until 2022): SC
- Website: www.malinovo.sk

Malinovo (German: Eberhardt, Hungarian: Éberhárd) is a village and municipality in western Slovakia in Senec District in the Bratislava Region.

== Names and etymology ==
The original name comes from a Germanic personal name Eberhardt. The earliest mentions are Yberhart (1209), Ybrehart (1216), Eburhardi (1260). In 1946, the village was renamed to Malinovo in honor of Soviet Marshal Rodion Malinovsky. Éberhárd is still the official name in the language of the Hungarian minority.

== Geography ==
The municipality lies at an altitude of 129 metres (423 ft) and covers an area of 8.82 km^{2} (3.41 sq mi) (2025).

== History ==
In historical records the village was first mentioned in 1209. In the 13th century, the village was inhabited by Germans who lived there until the 16th century. Malinovo was an important port on the Little Danube where also river tolls were charged. In 1548, the village was already completely abandoned and re-settled again. In 1773, it was already mostly Hungarian.

The old village castle was acquired in June 1763 by Count György Apponyi of the Apponyi family. It was rebuilt into its current form by the Apponyis in the early 19th century. Statesman György Apponyi died in the castle in 1899, and his son Albert Apponyi often received guests there. In 1923 it became the home of the State Agricultural School of Czechoslovakia. It is still home to a Horticultural School named after Gustav Čejka (cs).

After World War I, it became a part of Czechoslovakia. Between 1938 and 1945, through the First Vienna Award, Malinovo became a part of Miklós Horthy's Hungary . After World War II, the Hungarian population was partially expelled and replaced by Slovaks from Hungary.

== Point of Interest ==
The Apponyi castle is still standing in a public park, but (as of late 2019) in need of renovation.

== Population ==
Population statistic (10 years)
Year	1995	2005	2015	2025
Count	1259	1409	2870	4201
Difference		+11.91%	+103.69%	+46.37%

Population statistic
Year	2024	2025
Count	4146	4201
Difference		+1.32%

It has a population of 4201 people (31 December 2025).

=== Ethnicity ===
Census 2021 (1+ %)
Ethnicity	Number	Fraction
Slovak	3021	77.72%
Hungarian	640	16.46%
Not found out	274	7.04%
Total	3887	

In year 2021 was 3887 people by ethnicity 3021 as Slovak, 640 as Hungarian, 274 as Not found out, 36 as Czech, 28 as Rusyn, 28 as Other, 15 as German, 13 as Ukrainian, 8 as Italian, 7 as Vietnamese, 6 as Serbian, 6 as Polish, 5 as Bulgarian, 4 as Romani, 4 as Romanian, 4 as Austrian, 3 as Russian, 3 as English, 1 as Chinese and 1 as Korean.

Note on population: The difference values of population numbers in the table "Population statistic" and in the sections "Ethnicity" & "Religion" is caused by the use of various statistical methods.

=== Religion ===
Census 2021 (1+ %)
Religion	Number	Fraction
Roman Catholic Church	1845	47.47%
None	1441	37.07%
Not found out	265	6.82%
Evangelical Church	121	3.11%
Greek Catholic Church	56	1.44%
Total	3887	

In year 2021 was 3887 people by religion 1845 from Roman Catholic Church, 1441 from None, 265 from Not found out, 121 from Evangelical Church, 56 from Greek Catholic Church, 22 from Ad hoc movements, 18 from Calvinist Church, 18 from Eastern Orthodox Church, 17 from Other, 14 from Buddhism, 12 from Jehovah's Witnesses, 9 from Other and not ascertained christian church, 9 from Apostolic Church, 8 from Christian Congregations in Slovakia, 7 from United Methodist Church, 6 from Baptists Church, 5 from Islam, 5 from Seventh-day Adventist Church, 4 from Paganism and natural spirituality, 3 from Hinduism, 1 from Jewish community and 1 from Church of Jesus Christ of Latter-day Saints.

According to the 2011 census, the municipality had 1,861 inhabitants. 1,158 of inhabitants were Slovaks, 625 Hungarians, 13 Czechs and 65 others and unspecified.
