= Eversion =

Eversion (from the verb evert) is the process of turning inside-out. Eversion may refer to:

- Eversion (kinesiology), the anatomical term of motion denoting the movement of the sole of the foot away from the median plane
- Eversion (video game), a 2010 platform video game by Guilherme S. Tows
- In sea cucumbers, a form of autotomy in which the animal ejects its internal organs as a defensive strategy
- Stomach eversion in starfish, where prey is digested externally through an inside-out stomach, usually into a bivalve.
- Sphere eversion, the mathematical process of smoothly turning a sphere inside out
- Eversion (novel), a novel by Alastair Reynolds published on 26th May 2022

== See also ==
- Everts (disambiguation)
- Inversion (disambiguation)
- Inside Out (disambiguation)
