= Jacques Alfred van Muyden =

Swiss artist (1818–1898)

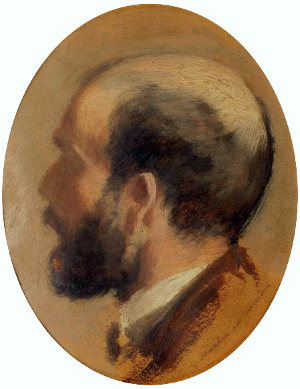
Self-portrait (date unknown)

Jacques Alfred van Muyden (22 October 1818, Lausanne - 11 May 1898, Geneva) was a Swiss history, portrait and genre painter, engraver, and a co-founder of the Society of Swiss Painters and Sculptors.

== Biography ==
His mother was Swiss, but his father was a Dutchman from Utrecht. His family wanted him to study law, but he chose painting instead. He was originally self-taught, but his early works were good enough for him to gain entrance to the Academy of Fine Arts, Munich, where he studied with Wilhelm von Kaulbach.

He returned home in 1842 but, not long after, on the recommendation of Marc-Louis Arlaud, he moved to Rome. Sick and generally unsuccessful, despite a showing at the Salon in 1846, he returned to Lausanne again in 1848 as the Revolutions began. The following year he married the sister of the Genevan painter, Étienne Duval (1824-1914). Their sons, Albert-Steven (1849-1910), Evert and Henri (1860-1936) all became painters.

From 1850 to 1856, he and his family lived in Rome, then purchased a villa in Champel, near Geneva. In 1857, some of his works were purchased by Napoleon III.

That same year, he and the Mayor of Cologny, Auguste Turrettini, co-founded the "Gesellschaft der Freunde der bildenden Künste". They also established a permanent exhibition, which he oversaw for twenty-three years. Three years later, he was one of the many founding members of the "Gesellschaft der Schweizer Maler und Bildhauer" and served as its Chairman on several occasions.

From 1880 to 1882, he was involved in copyright issues, attempting to establish that the right of reproduction belongs to a work's creator only, not to its owner.

== Selected paintings ==
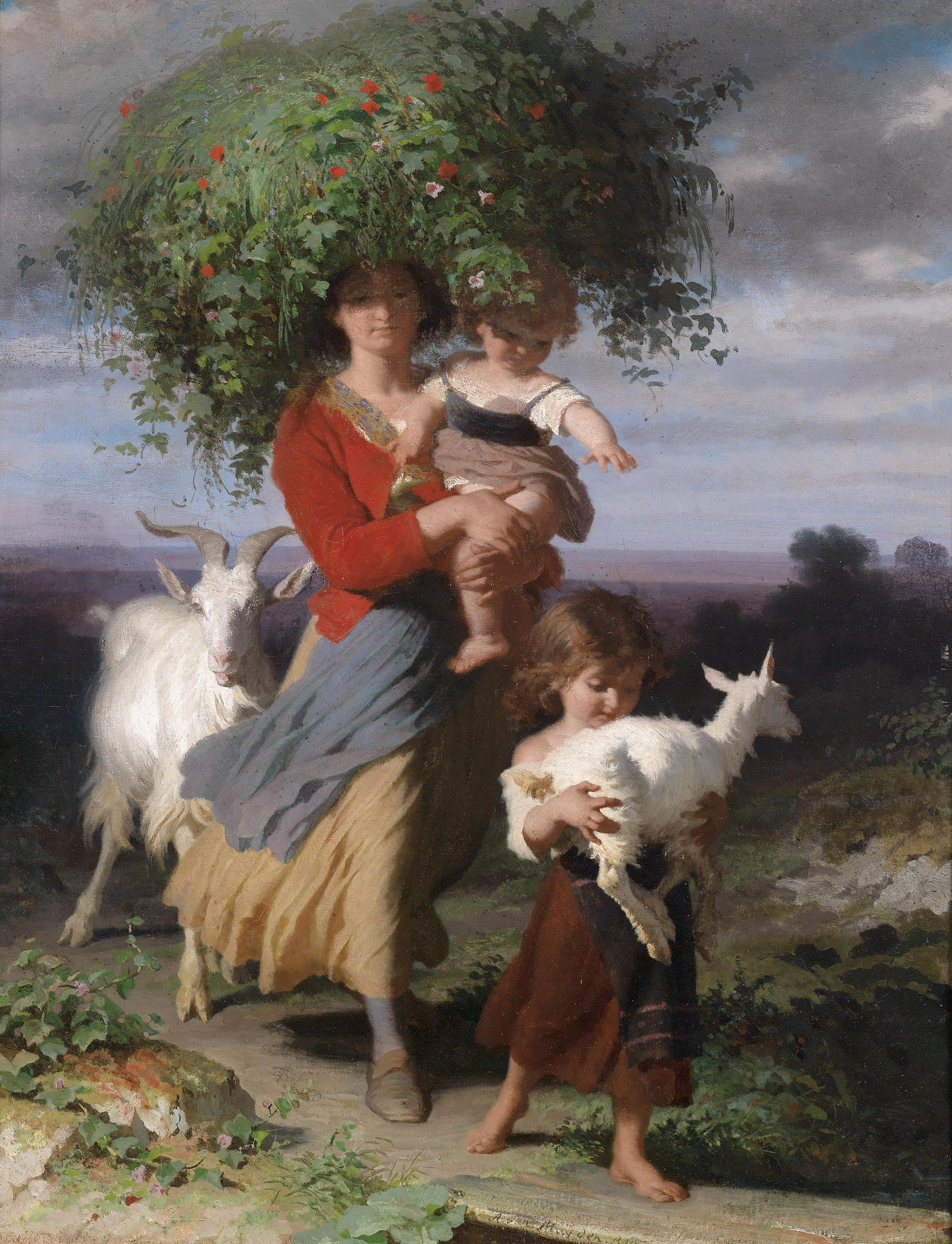
Mother returning Home
with Children

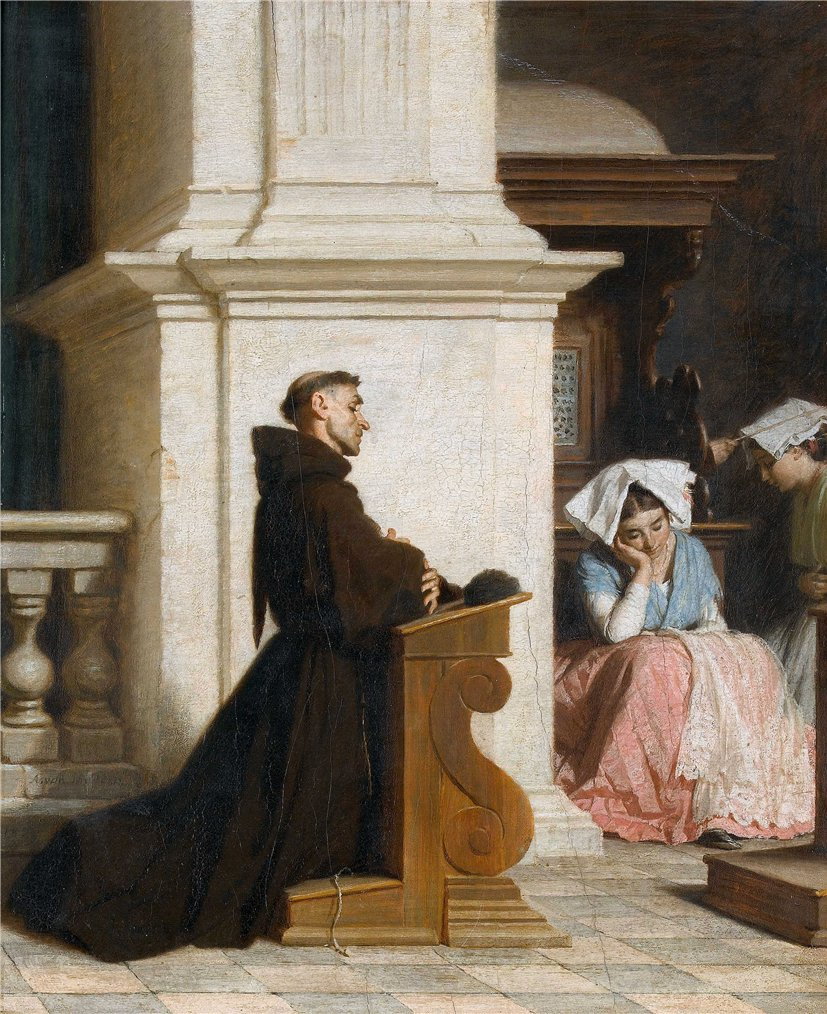
Praying Monk

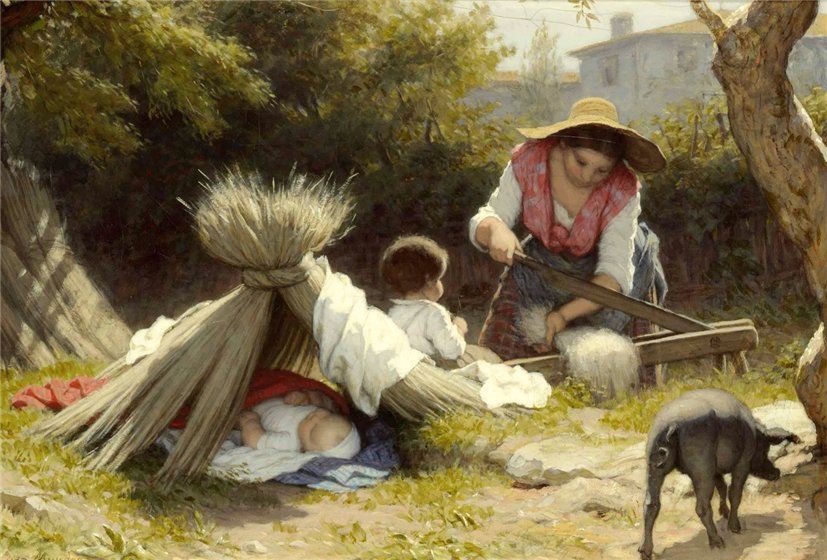
Farm Chores

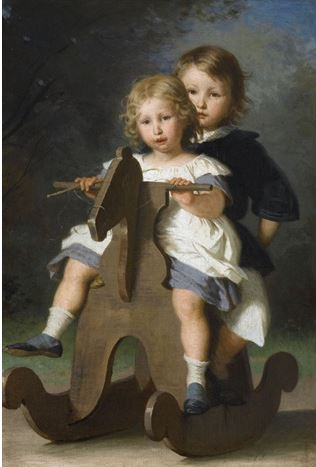
His sons, Théophile
and Berthold

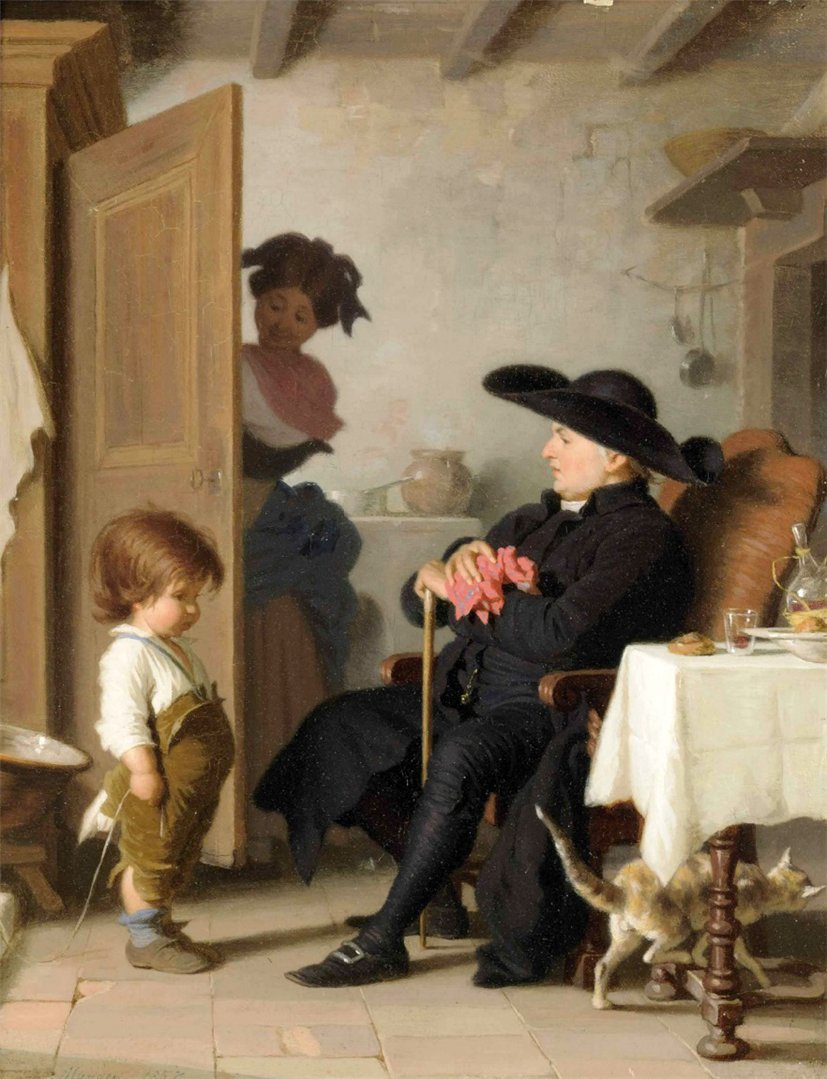
Words of Wisdom
