= Wayne Aberhart =

New Zealand cricketer (born 1958)

Personal information
- Full name: Wayne Aberhart
- Born: 10 May 1958 (age 68); Motueka
- Batting: Right-handed
- Bowling: Right-arm medium
- Relatives: Denis Aberhart (brother)

Career statistics
Competition	First-class
Matches	2
Runs scored	28
Batting average	14
100s/50s	0/0
Top score	24
Balls bowled	234
Wickets	1
Bowling average	119
5 wickets in innings	0
10 wickets in match	0
Best bowling	1/50
Catches/stumpings	0/–
- Source: CricketArchive, 26 June 2016

Wayne Aberhart (born 10 May 1958) is a New Zealand cricketer who played for Wellington in first-class cricket. His two first-class appearances occurred during the 1985–86 New Zealand cricket season.
