= Reversal =

Reversal often refers to:

- Reversal (law), when the decision of a court of appeal is that the judgment of a lower court was incorrect
- Reversal (wrestling), an action in which a defender achieves an offensive position

Reversal may also refer to:

== Entertainment ==
- "Reversal" (Arrow), a 2017 episode of the American television series Arrow
- Reversal (film), a 2001 American movie about wrestling
- Reversal (video game), a 1981 a video game for the Apple II
- The Reversal, a 2010 novel by Michael Connelly

== Related ==
=== Terms ===
- Geomagnetic reversal, a change in a planet's magnetic field such that the positions of magnetic north and magnetic south are interchanged
- Medical reversal, when a newer and methodologically superior clinical trial produces results that contradict existing clinical practice
- Reversal agent, an antidote
- Reversal film, a type of photographic film that produces a positive image on a transparent base
- Reversal test, a heuristic designed to spot and eliminate status quo bias
- Reversal theory, a structural, phenomenological theory of personality, motivation, and emotion in the field of psychology
- Risk reversal, a measure of the volatility skew or to a trading strategy in finance
- Role reversal, a psychotherapeutic technique
- Russian reversal, a type of joke, usually starting with the words "In Soviet Russia"
- Thrust reversal, the temporary diversion of an aircraft engine's thrust

=== Concepts ===
- Aristotle's concept of peripeteia, a reversal of circumstances, or turning point
- Reversal, a formal language concept, see Formal language#Operations on languages
- Reversal, an options-trading strategy, see Reversal (options)

== See also ==
- Reverse (disambiguation)
- Reversion (disambiguation)
