= Everett Bridgewater =

American bank robber

Everett Bridgewater (born c.1902) was an American bank robber during the Prohibition era. He is best known as an early associate of Harry Pierpont.

== Criminal career ==
=== Pierpont-Bridgewater-Northern Gang, 1924-25 ===
==== South Marion State Bank, Marion, Indiana, November 26, 1924 ====
At 2:45 in the afternoon of November 26, 1924, seven young, unmasked, well-dressed bandits held up the officers and two customers of the South Marion State Bank at Thirty-first and Washington streets in Marion, Indiana, robbing the bank of approximately $4,000.00 in cash. No one was injured, and not a shot was fired. Five men went inside, two stayed outside.

The leader of the gang walked in ahead of the others and ordered "hands up", forcing the cashier and bookkeeper into the vault. According to newspaper accounts, the gang had evidently studied the situation, knew the surroundings, and carried out their job with clockwork precision and uncanny accuracy.

After the robbery, the bandits jumped into a purring Nash motor car and sped off south. Sixteen towns in a fifty-mile radius of Marion were notified of the robbery, and to be on the lookout for a Nash car with yellow license plates. One report had them heading west on State Route 35, another report had them travelling east through Bluffton, Indiana at a high speed. A couple from Fairmount, Indiana reported seeing a car matching that of the robbers at three o'clock, traveling west through Hackelman, Indiana in the direction of Elwood, Indiana. Grant County Sheriff Bert Renbarger and his deputies stopped a Nash car matching the description at Sweetser, Indiana but the occupants were found to be out of town businessmen.

Initial reports indicated that based on the description of the bandits, they were believed to be the same gang who had robbed the Farmers National Bank at Converse, Indiana the week before. Sheriff Renbarger speculated the robbers might be from South Bend, Terre Haute, Chicago, or Logansport.

==== Citizens State Bank, Noblesville, Indiana, December 16, 1924 ====
Just before closing time on December 16, 1924, seven unmasked bandits made an unsuccessful attempt to rob the Citizens State Bank. The bandit's car drove up to the side of the bank and six men leaped to the sidewalk and ran into the building, brandishing revolvers.

While three robbers rushed to the rear of the bank to cover officials, the other three ordered several customers and the cashier to hold up their hands. The leader of the bandits cautioned his associates to listen for an alarm repeatedly. With a revolver near his head, bank President Dunn touched a button on the floor which started a burglar alarm. The bandits immediately ran out the door and sped away with nothing for their effort. The bandits headed north in a Cadillac bearing Indiana license plate 11829 at a high speed.

==== Shelby Hardware Store, Lebanon, Indiana, December 22, 1924 ====
On December 22, 1924, the John D. Shelby Hardware Store of Lebanon, Indiana was robbed of two rifles, two double barreled shot guns, one hammerless double barrel shot gun, two single shot rifles, one Marlin rifle, repeater, two Remington repeating rifles, eight pocket knives, one six inch barrel pistol, one 32 German automatic revolver, about fifty boxes of ammunition, four flashlights, several batteries, and other articles.

Boone County, Indiana Sheriff Joe C. Cain notified Grant County, Indiana Sheriff Renbarger of the list of items stolen from the Lebanon store and stated that the robbers were driving a Moon sedan, with the license 443–554, which was stolen from Indianapolis the night of the Lebanon robbery. The automobile belonged to George W. Killinger, Jr. of 1922 North Pennsylvania street in Indianapolis and was reported stolen on December 22.

==== Upland State Bank, Upland, Indiana, December 23, 1924 ====
At 3:45 in the afternoon of December 23, 1924, six armed bandits entered the Upland State Bank within fifteen minutes of closing time and robbed the bank of approximately $2500.00

The bandits attempted to lock the cashier and a female employee in the bank vault. Finding that the safe would not work, they began scooping all of the money in sight as well as all the money in sight in the safe, consisting of paper and silver. One of the bandits cautioned bank officials against making false moves under pain of having "hell shot out of them".

After getting all the money in sight, they quickly left the bank and hopped into a waiting automobile, in which the sixth bandit sat, and departed north out of Upland, where it was reported they turned west.

A good description of the men was secured by Deputy Sheriffs John Schell and Woody Smith, who conversed with the six men at a filing station at Highland avenue and Washington streets in Marion at about 2:30 in the afternoon that day. The men had been asking about the road to Hartford City and that they desired to find State Road 35.

The men were first noticed in Marion driving a Moon car, bearing the license plate number 443-554, which was seen driving the wrong way around the public square. The license number matched one that had been in town about a week before, when it ran a stop sign at Fourth and Nebraska streets and failed to stop when called on by the police.

Reports indicated that Sheriff Renbarger notified many surrounding cities and Indianapolis, as it was believed that the gang had a headquarters in that city and was the same crowd who attempted to hold up a bank at Noblesville, Indiana the week before.

The automobile used by the bandits of the Upland State Bank and the Lebanon hardware store was found abandoned in the mud at Kempton, Indiana on December 27, 1924. Authorities learned that the car became mired in the mud around 7:30 in the evening of December 23. The men walked to a local home and called a garage at Kempton. The garage worker started to take the men to Frankfort, Indiana at their request. Carrying shotguns, rifles, revolvers and satchels, the men changed their minds and asked to be dropped off at the edge of town at Lebanon, Indiana. The men told the garage mechanic they had been out hunting and were from Louisville, Kentucky and wished to get home for Christmas.

No one ever came back for the car, and authorities were notified.

==== Arrest in Kokomo, Indiana, March 22, 1925 ====
On March 22, 1925, Everett, along with Harry Pierpont, was arrested by Kokomo, Indiana police on suspicion of possessing a stolen car. However, the possession of the Ford roadster they were driving was found to be legitimate and they were released.

==== First State Bank of Galveston, Galveston, Indiana, June 6, 1925 ====
On June 6, 1925, three bandits entered the First State Bank of Galveston, Indiana around 9 o'clock and robbed the bank of $3,000. A fourth bandit stayed at the wheel of a Studebaker automobile.

The cashier of the bank was alone at the time of the robbery. Two and a half miles from Galveston the car was abandoned.

==== Arrest in Indianapolis, Indiana, June 19, 1925 ====
At the trial of habitual criminal Earl Northern, Bridgewater was accused as a principal in the South Kokomo bank robbery as well as the South Marion robbery. It was noted that if apprehended, Bridgewater would likely be turned over to Grant County authorities as the case against him was stronger there.

Bridgewater managed to elude authorities for several months before being captured by Indianapolis police on June 19, 1925. Arrested along with Bridgewater were Clinton Simms, 25, and Bridgewater's brother-in-law, William A. Zander.

Bridgewater confessed to police that he had obtained an estimated $33,000 in cash and double that amount in securities. He confessed to participating in the robberies at Upland, Marion, Kokomo and New Harmony. At the time of his arrest, police found two army rifles, a shotgun and a revolver with 150 rounds of ammunition in Bridgewater's possession.

Bridgewater was transferred to Kokomo and entered a guilty plea to the four bank robberies the next day. According to an AP report, "Less than five minutes was required for Judge John Marshall to hear the plea of guilty and to pass sentence," with Bridgewater to spend at least 10 and no more than 21 years in prison and sent to the state reformatory at Pendleton. Bridgewater spent the next nine years in prison, but was paroled in 1934 from the Indiana State Penitentiary in Michigan City, Indiana based on affidavits that "he is a model prisoner and has taken correspondence courses in accounting and chemistry since he entered the prison.

==== Arrest of Other Bridgewater Gang Members ====
Shortly after Bridgewater's arrest and sentencing to at least 10 years in prison, three other members of the Bridgewater gang were arrested.

On June 30, 1925, Norman Lipscomb, 23, was arrested in Indianapolis after an exchange of gunfire and was being questioned about a number of recent robberies. He was described as a known member of the gang formerly headed by Bridgewater.

On July 3, 1925, a George "Dewey" Elliott was arrested in Indianapolis and was believed to be connected with the Kokomo bank bandit gang. Kokomo police were doubting that the man arrested in Indianapolis was the same as the Kokomo "Dewey" Elliott, husband of local madam Pearl Elliott. The Kokomo Elliott was a known associate of Pierpont and Bridgewater.

On July 4, 1925, Clifford Roth was arrested in Indianapolis as the fourth member of the gang who robbed the Galveston Bank under $5,000 bond on a vagrancy charge. Roth was implicated through the confessions of other members of the "Bridgewater gang", but denied being involved when arrested.

=== Robberies in Indiana, 1935 ===
==== Grocery store, Dublin, Indiana, December 21, 1935 ====
On December 21, 1935, Bridgewater along with Clyde Steinbarger and Eugene Dickson, robbed a grocery store in Dublin, Indiana. Witnesses at the trial identified Bridgewater as the trigger man who fired several shots at store employees as they attempted to flee.

Tried at Richmond, Indiana, Judge Earl Keisker gave Bridgewater the mandatory sentence of not less than 10 nor more than 25 years. Bridgewater had to complete the remainder of his original sentence from Howard County Judge Marshall for the South Kokomo Bank robbery, making the minimum sentence 21 years and the maximum of 36 years before he could be paroled.

Bridgewater attempted to bargain with the original judge, Judge Hoelscher, boasting of his knowledge of John Dillinger and telling how the prison break had denied his receiving parole. When these efforts failed, Bridgewater obtained a change of venue and threw himself on the mercy of Special Judge Kiesker.
