= Eberhard =

Eberhard is an old Germanic name meaning the strength or courage of a wild boar.

== People ==
=== First name ===
- Eberhard of Friuli (815–866), Duke and key figure in the Carolingian Empire
- Eberhard of Béthune (died 1212), Flemish grammarian
- Eberhard I, Count of Bonngau (died 937)
- Eberhard I, Duke of Württemberg (1445–1496)
- Eberhard II, Count of Württemberg (after 1315–1392)
- Eberhard III, Duke of Franconia (c. 885–939)
- Eberhard (Archbishop of Trier) (1010–1066)
- Eberhard of Salzburg (died 1164), Bishop of Salzburg and saint
- Eberhard Zacharias Munck af Rosenschöld (1775–1840), Swedish vaccine pioneer
- Eberhard Anheuser (1806–1880), soap and candle maker, co-founder of Anheuser-Busch
- Eberhard Esche (1933–2006), German actor
- Eberhard Gienger (born 1951), German politician (CDU) and former West German gymnast
- Eberhard Jüngel (1934–2021), German Lutheran theologian
- Eberhard Wagner (born 1938), German linguist and author
- Eberhard Weber (born 1940), German jazz musician and composer

=== Last name ===
- Eberhard family, a prominent Swiss industrialist family (Eberhard & Co.) from Bern whose origin has been traced back to the 10th century
  - George-Emile Eberhard (1868–1936), founder of Eberhard & Co.
  - George Eberhard, George-Emile's son and heir
  - Maurice Eberhard, George-Emile's son and heir
- Christian August Gottlob Eberhard (1769–1884), German writer
- Dennis Eberhard (1943–2005), American composer
- Fritz Eberhard (1896–1982), German journalist
- Hans J. Müller-Eberhard (1927–1998), molecular immunologist
- Hermann Eberhard (1852–1908), 19th-century German explorer who discovered Giant sloth remains at Cueva del Milodon Natural Monument
- Johann Augustus Eberhard (1739–1809), German theologian
- Martin Eberhard (born 1960), co-founder and former CEO of Tesla Motors
- Mary Jane West-Eberhard (born 1941), contemporary biologist upon social wasps and phenotypic plasticity
- Matthias Eberhard (1815–1876), Roman Catholic Bishop of Trier
- Paul Eberhard (1917–1983), Swiss bobsledder
- Théodore Eberhard (1812–1874), Luxembourgish architect and politician
- Wolfram Eberhard (1909–1989), a sociologist of rural China

== Companies ==
- Eberhard's, supermarket chain in Michigan

== Places ==
- Malinovo Castle, often referred to as Eberhard

== See also ==
- Everard, anglicized version of the name
- Evert, Dutch version of the name
- Eberhardt
- Eberhart (disambiguation)
