= Sexual inversion =

Sexual inversion may refer to:

- Sexual inversion (sexology), a term for homosexuality found primarily in older scientific literature
  - Sexual Inversion, a textbook by Havelock Ellis about homosexuality
- A metamorphic change in the gender of an animal
- A reversal in the normal sexual behavior of an animal, e.g. males being submissive, or females exhibiting mounting behavior
