= Denis Aberhart =

New Zealand cricketer and school teacher

Personal information
- Full name: Denis Charles Aberhart
- Born: 23 March 1953 (age 73); Motueka, Tasman, New Zealand
- Batting: Right-handed
- Bowling: Right-arm medium
- Relatives: Wayne Aberhart (brother)

Domestic team information
- Years: Team
- 1976/77–1982/83: Central Districts
- 1983/84: Canterbury

Career statistics
Competition	First-class	List A
Matches	38	17
Runs scored	597	82
Batting average	13.65	8.20
100s/50s	0/0	0/0
Top score	40*	15*
Balls bowled	6,094	848
Wickets	101	20
Bowling average	23.16	29.05
5 wickets in innings	5	0
10 wickets in match	0	0
Best bowling	6/55	4/32
Catches/stumpings	24/–	4/–
- Source: Cricinfo, 23 November 2021

Denis Charles Aberhart (born 23 March 1953) is a New Zealand former first-class cricketer who played for Canterbury and Central Districts between 1976/77 and 1983/84. He was a school teacher who served as principal of several schools in Christchurch.

== Life and career ==
Aberhart was a right-arm medium-pace bowler and useful lower-order batsman. His best first-class figures were 6 for 55 for Central Districts against Auckland in 1982–83. Auckland, chasing 284 to win, were 269 for 6 before Aberhart took the last four wickets to give Central Districts victory by eight runs. In December 1981 he won the player of the match award when he took 4 for 32 against Auckland when Central Districts won by three wickets. He also played for Marlborough in the Hawke Cup. Captaining Marlborough in a Hawke Cup elimination match in 1979–80 against Buller, he took 5 for 11 and 7 for 21 (match figures of 37.2–22–32–12).

Aberhart became coach of Canterbury during the 1990s before serving as full-time coach of New Zealand between 2001 and 2004. He was a director of Canterbury Cricket for eleven years, and is a board member of the Marlborough Cricket Association.

Aberhart was a school teacher for nearly 50 years. He was Principal of St Paul's School in the Christchurch suburb of Dallington, then of Our Lady of Fatima School in another suburb, Mairehau, and was finally Principal of Our Lady of Victories School in Upper Riccarton, Christchurch, between 2015 and his retirement in July 2021.
