= Eberhart =

Eberhart is both a surname and a given name. Notable people with the name include:

== Surname ==
- Adolph Olson Eberhart (1870–1944), American politician
- Mark Eberhart, American chemist and author
- Meredith J. Eberhart, American hiker
- Mignon G. Eberhart (1899–1996), American author
- Ralph Eberhart (born 1946), United States Air Force general
- Richard Eberhart (1904–2005), American poet
- Russell C. Eberhart, American electrical engineer
- Sean Eberhart (born 1966), American politician

== Given name ==
- Eberhart Jensen (1922–2003), Norwegian astrophysicist

== Fictional characters ==
- Joanna Eberhart, protagonist of the novel The Stepford Wives and the two film adaptations

== See also ==
- Eberhart Steel Products Company of Buffalo, New York, United States
- Eberhard
- Eberhardt
