= Evert Groenewald =

Evert Phillipus Groenewald
- Relatives: daughter Tina Struthers
- Military career
- Allegiance: South Africa
- Branch: South African Navy
- Service years: 1963 - 1999
- Rank: Rear Admiral
- Nickname: Gringo
- Commands: Chief of Naval Operations; Chief of Naval Staff Intelligence
- Awards: Southern Cross Decoration; Southern Cross Medal; Military Merit Medal

Rear Admiral Evert Groenewald is a retired South African Navy officer, who served as Chief of Naval Operations before his retirement in 1999.

He joined the Navy in 1963 at the South African Naval College and later obtained a BMil (BSc) at the South African Military Academy

He commanded the submarines SAS Emily Hobhouse and SAS Johanna van der Merwe

He served as Chief of Naval Staff Intelligence as a commodore and on 1 May 1996 was promoted to rear admiral and appointed Chief of Naval Operations.

He retired in 1999 and the post of Chief of Naval Operations was re-organised into Flag Officer Fleet during a Navy restructuring.

== Awards and decorations ==
- Southern Cross Medal (1975) (SM)
- Military Merit Medal (MMM)
- Pro Patria Medal
- Southern Africa Medal
- General Service Medal (South Africa)
- Unitas (Unity) Medal
- Good Service Medal (Gold (30 Years))
- Good Service Medal (Silver (20 Years))
- Good Service Medal (Bronze (10 Years))

== See also ==
- South African Navy

Military offices
Preceded by Johan Retief	Chief of Naval Staff Operations; 1996-1999	Post disestablished
Unknown	Chief of Naval Staff Intelligence; 1992–1996	Succeeded by Peter Keene
