= Evert Kulenius =

Finnish politician (1879–1958)

Matts Evert Kulenius (8 March 1879, Terjärv - 4 February 1958) was a Finnish schoolteacher and politician. He was a member of the Parliament of Finland from 1922 to 1927, representing the Swedish People's Party of Finland (SFP).
