= REVERSE art gallery =

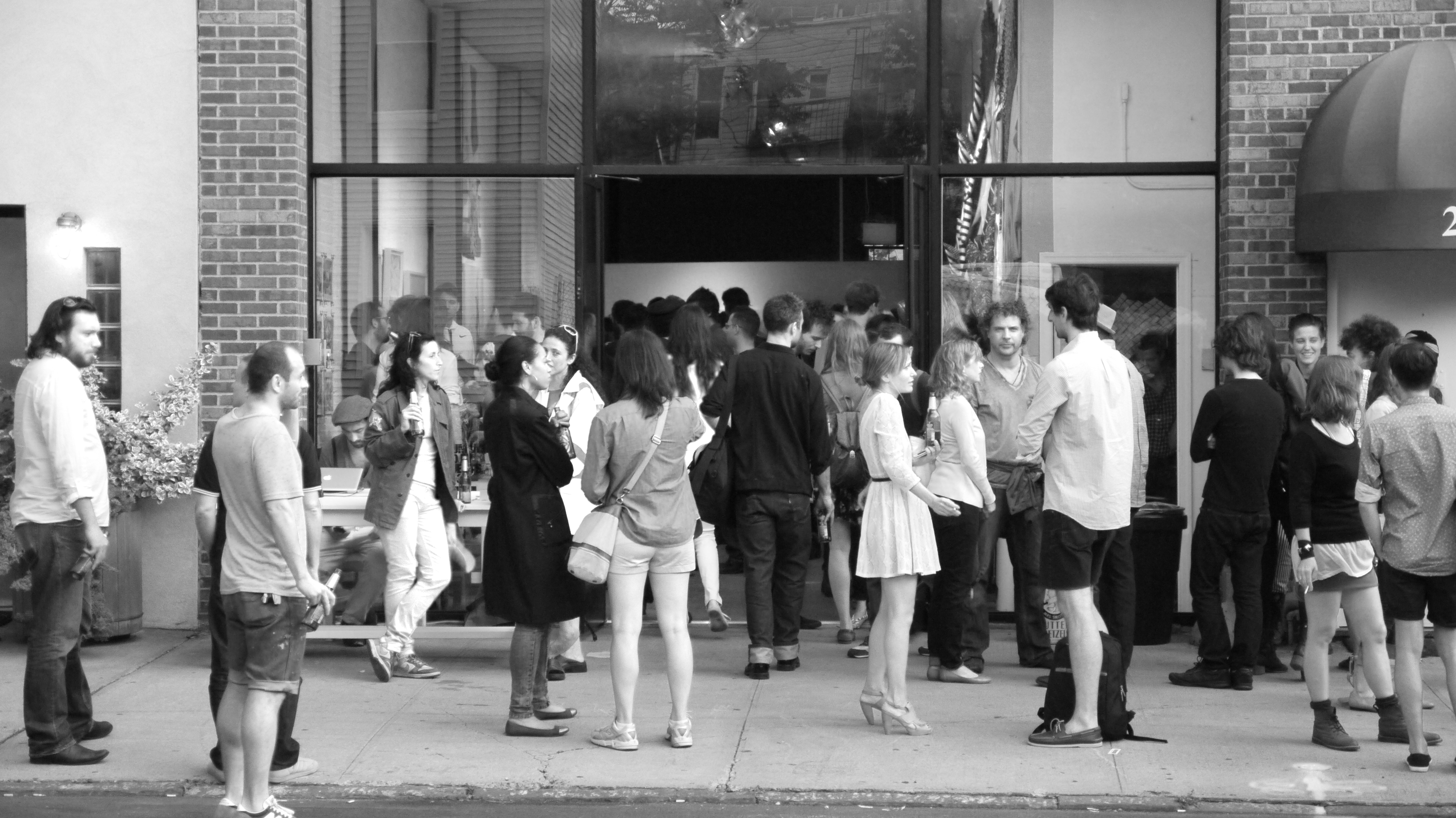
REVERSE in Williamsburg, Brooklyn

REVERSE was an art space located in Williamsburg, Brooklyn, that served as a platform for new and experimental forms of expression. From 2012 to 2016, REVERSE provided emerging, mid-career, local and international artists with opportunities to create and exhibit new work.

REVERSE hosts an ongoing open call for curatorial proposals. Andrea Wolf, artist and Director of REVERSE, described the space: “[REVERSE] is a place where young curators will have an opportunity to take risks that wouldn't be accepted in more conservative galleries.” Since its inception, REVERSE has worked collaboratively with outside curators, including AD Projects and Christian Berman, to produce numerous exhibitions and programs, including The Impossible Project (curated by NY based artist Renzo Ortega) and REVERSE Open Lab. Through its Artist Community, REVERSE supports a select group of artists who feature regularly in its exhibitions and projects. Members include: CHi KA, Melissa F. Clarke, Brandon Friend & Jason Douglas Griffin, Daria Irincheeva and Alexsey Yudzon.
