= Evert van Milligen =

Dutch politician and accountant

Evert van Milligen (born 1948 in Otterlo) is a Dutch politician and former Chartered Accountant. As a member of the People's Party for Freedom and Democracy (Volkspartij voor Vrijheid en Democratie) he was a member of the municipal council of Ede from 2002 to 2008. Since 2008 he has been an alderman of the same municipality.
