= Evert Huttunen =

Finnish politician and journalist (1884–1924)

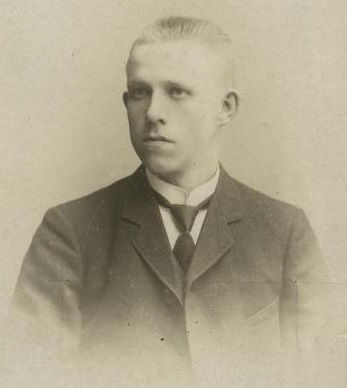
Evert Huttunen, c. 1910

Evert Johan Valdemar Huttunen (8 May 1884, Toksovo, Saint Petersburg Governorate - 29 March 1924) was a Finnish journalist and politician. He was a member of the Parliament of Finland from 1916 until his death in 1924, representing the Social Democratic Party of Finland (SDP). He did not take part in the Finnish Civil War, maintaining a neutral attitude.
