= Evert van Muyden =

Swiss engraver, illustrator and painter

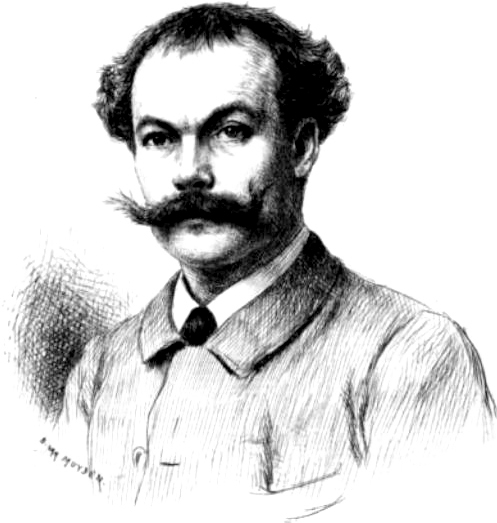
Self-portrait

Evert Louis van Muyden (18 July 1853, Albano Laziale – 27 February 1922, Orsay) was an engraver, illustrator and painter, born to Swiss parents. His brothers, Albert-Steven van Muyden (1849-1910) and Henri van Muyden (1860-1936) were also artists.

== Biography ==
At first studying with his father, the painter Jacques Alfred van Muyden (1818–1898), Evert later lived and studied in Geneva at the Beaux-Arts, under Carl Steffeck in Berlin and under Jean-Léon Gérôme at the Paris Beaux-Arts. He worked in Rome between 1879 and 1884, concentrating on landscapes, and showing the clear influence of Corot.

After 1885, he worked in Paris painting animals in the style of Antoine-Louis Barye. He virtually lived at the Museum National d'Histoire Naturelle in Paris and the Zoologischer Garten in Basle, creating hundreds of drawings and engravings of plants and animals. He was sought after as an illustrator of books, providing images for Champfleury's Contes choisis (Paris, 1899) and Emil Frey's Die Kriegstaten der Schweizer (Neuchatel, 1905).

His engravings and book illustrations remained popular, overshadowing his occasional portraits and sculptures.

== Gallery ==
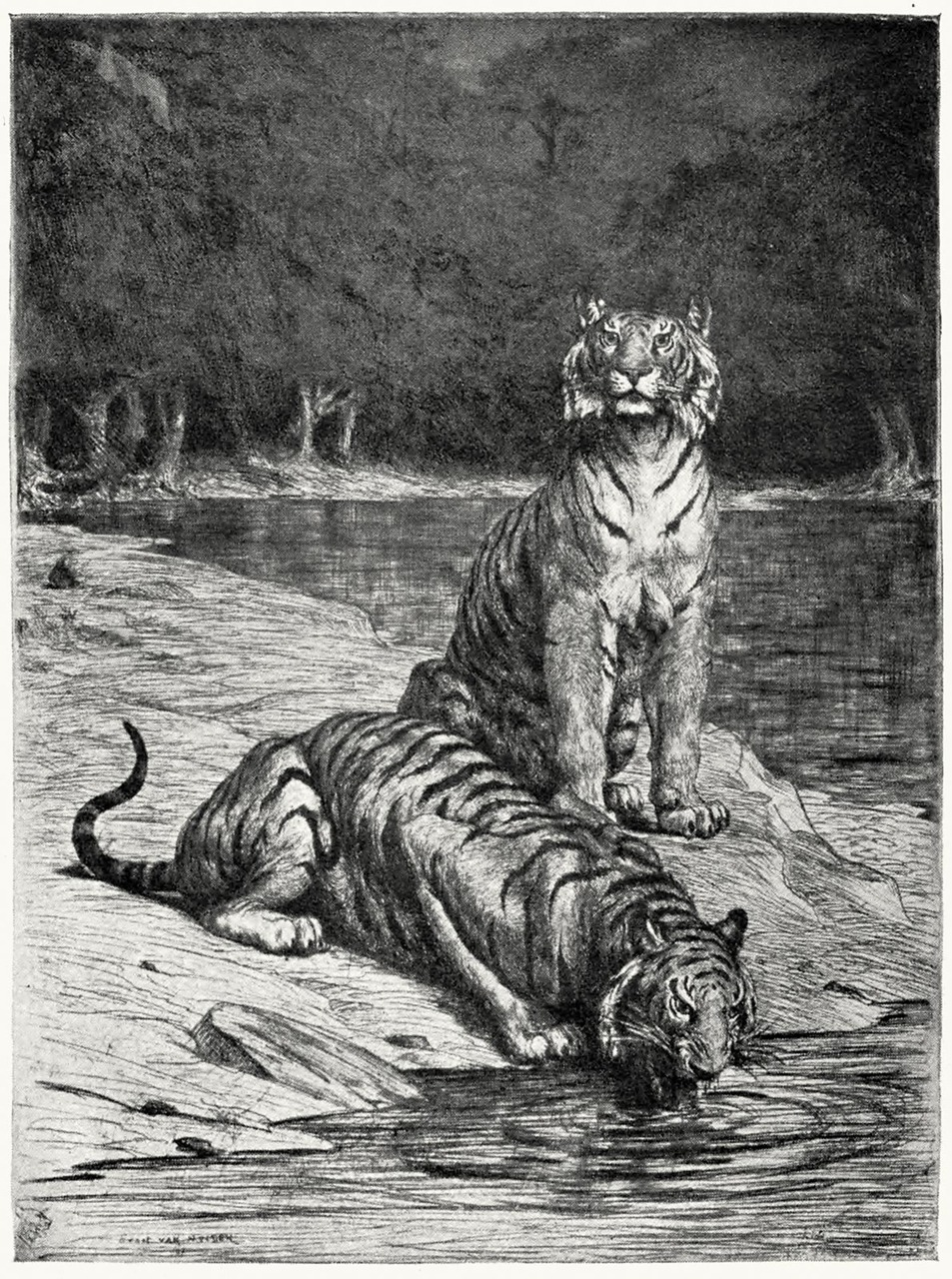
Bengal Tigers

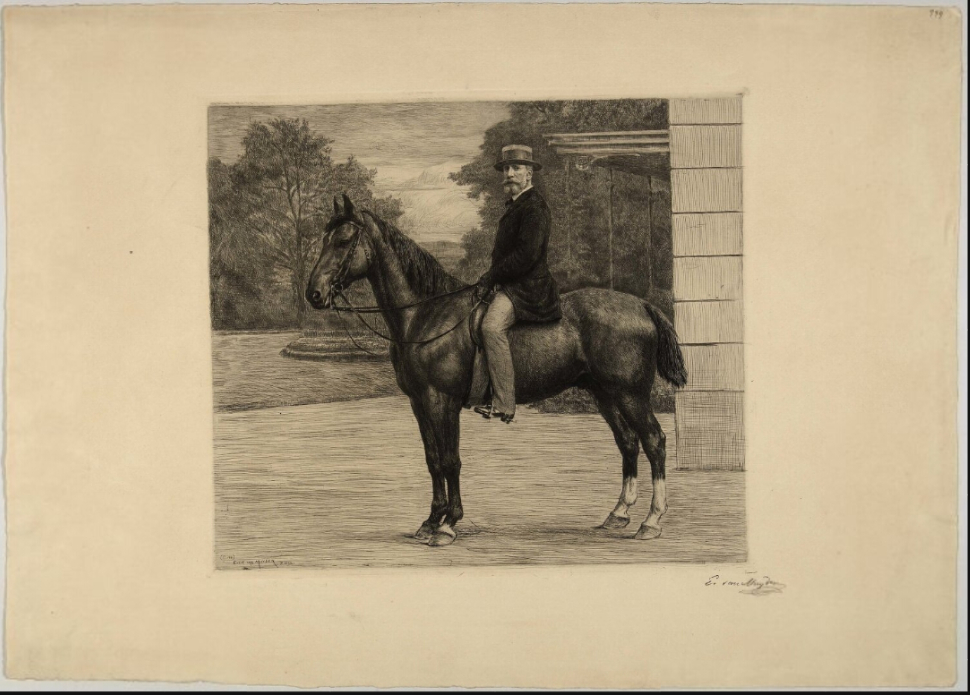
Portrait of Émile Gautier

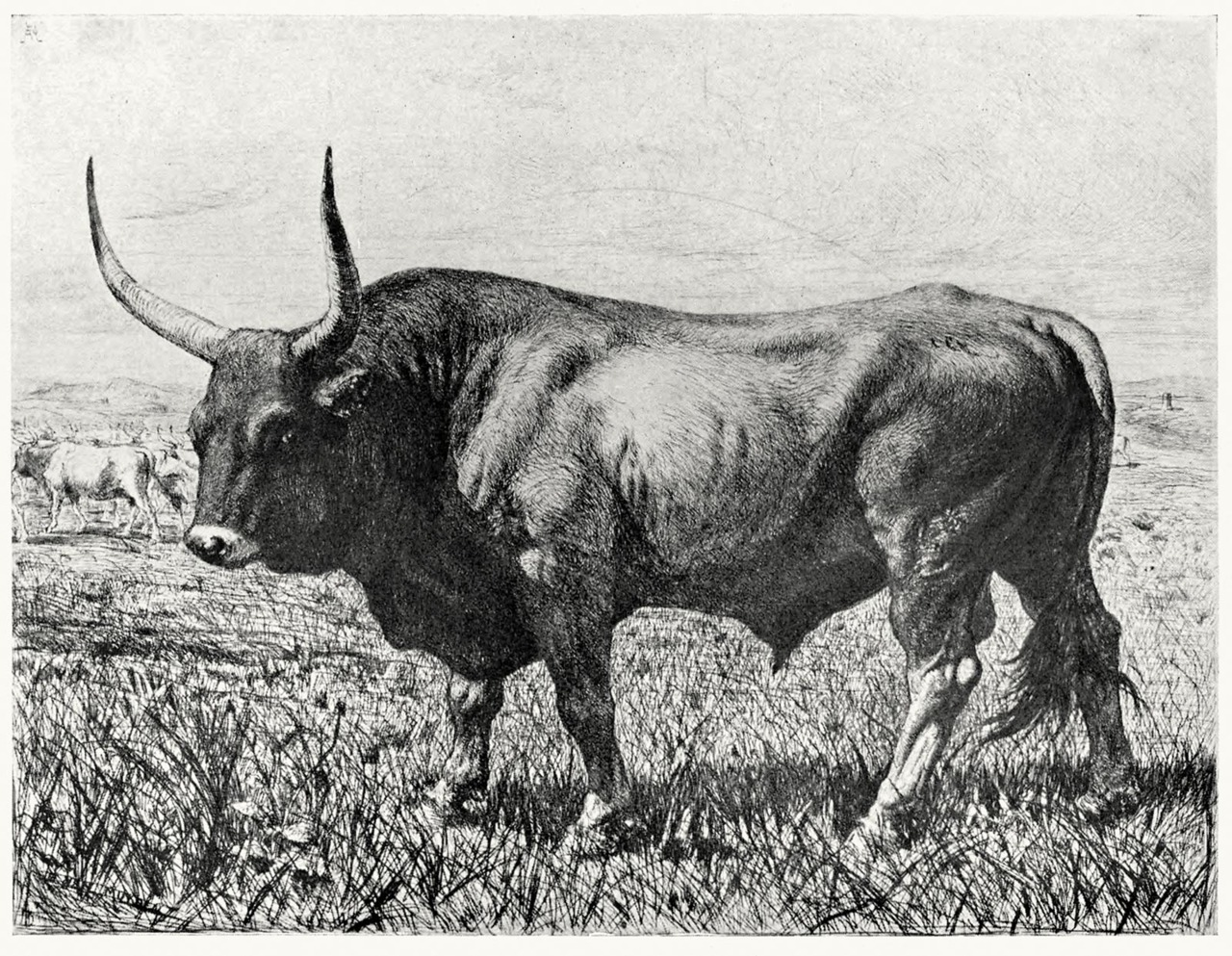
Bull of the Roman Campagna

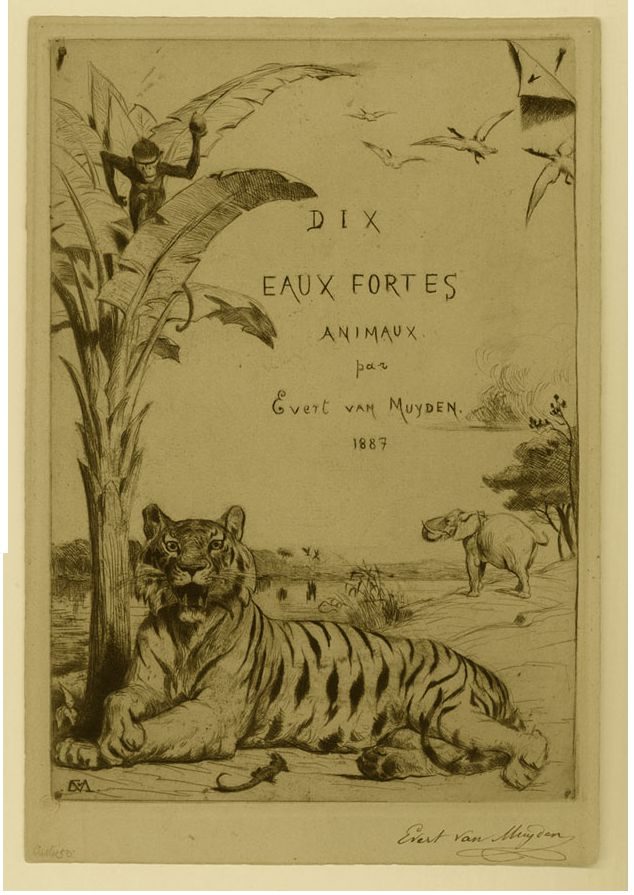
Book Cover
