= J. Everett Prewitt =

American novelist

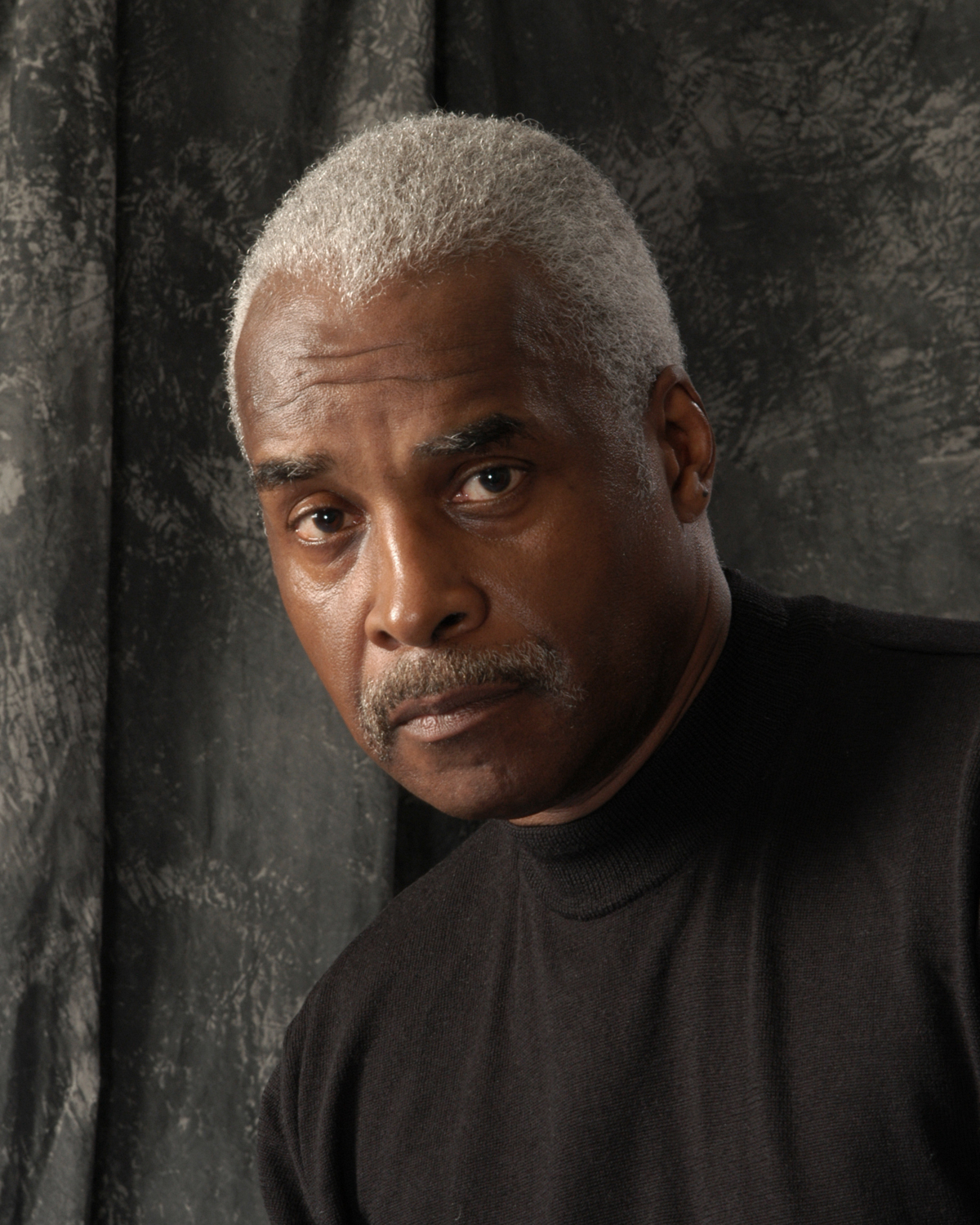
- Prewitt at Rodney Brown Studio
- Born: November 12, 1942 (age 83); Cleveland, Ohio, United States
- Education: Lincoln University (Pennsylvania) (1966, B.A.) Cleveland State University, Cleveland, Ohio (1978, MS in Urban Studies)
- Alma mater: Lincoln University (Pennsylvania) and Cleveland State University, Cleveland, Ohio
- Occupations: Author and Real Estate Consultant
- Children: Lia Martin, Eric Prewitt
- Writing career
- Language: English
- Years active: 1972–present
- Period: 1962–1977
- Genre: Historical Fiction
- Notable works: Snake Walkers, A Long Way Back, Something About Ann
- Notable awards: Snake Walkers: First Prize, Los Angeles Black Book Expo; Fiction Honor Award, Black Caucus of the American Library Association, Inc. A Long Way Back: First Place, Independent Publishers of New England
- Website: eprewitt.com

James Everett Prewitt (born November 12, 1942) is an American novelist and former Army officer who served in the Vietnam War.

== Novels ==
Prewitt's debut novel, Snake Walkers, won the Bronze award in the General Fiction category of ForeWord Magazine's Book of the Year Award. In 2006, Snake Walkers was also honored by the Black Caucus of the American Library Association. It won First Place for Fiction at the Los Angeles Black Book Expo in March 2005 and 2nd place at the Independent Book Awards held in New York City in 2005. Snake Walkers also won first place in the USA Best Book Awards 2005.

Prewitt's second novel, A Long Way Back, was published in 2015. It received the Seal of Approval from Literary Classics, and was also a finalist for the Montaigne Award, and the INDIEFAB Book of the Year Award. A Long Way Back won the Independent Publishers of New England first place award, the Silver Award from Literary Classics, and the Silver Award from the Military Writers Society of America (MWSA).

The second edition of Prewitt's third novel, Something About Ann, was published January 2024. The first edition won the 2018 Eric Hoffer da Vinci Eye Finalist The second edition was a finalist in the 2024 International Book Awards and a finalist in the 2024 Independent Author Network.

Prewitt's Autobiography, "A Life In The Sunshine," was published in September 2025.

== Education ==
Prewitt received his bachelor's degree from Lincoln University in Pennsylvania and a master's degree from Cleveland State University. He was awarded the title of distinguished alumni from both schools.
