= Eberhardt =

Eberhardt is a Germanic surname. It may refer to:

== People ==
- Andrei Eberhardt (1856–1919), Russian naval officer
- Charles Eberhardt (1871–1965), American diplomat
- Cliff Eberhardt (b. 1954), American contemporary folk singer and songwriter
- Erich Eberhardt (1913–1965), German military officer
- Frederick Eberhardt (philanthropist) (1868–1946), American engineer, philanthropist, university administrator and president of Gould & Eberhardt
- Frederick Eberhardt (philosopher) (born 1978), American philosopher
- Georg Eberhardt (1914–1943), German military officer
- Henri Eberhardt (1913–1976), French canoeist
- Hugo Eberhardt (1874–1959), German architect
- Isabelle Eberhardt (1877–1904), Swiss writer and explorer of North Africa
- Thom Eberhardt (b. 1947), American film director, producer and screenwriter
- Walter von Eberhardt (1862–1944), German general
- William Eberhardt, American forger of the Dare Stones

== Locations ==
- Fitzner-Eberhardt Arid Lands Ecology Reserve, an area of the Hanford Reach National Monument, Washington, US

== Companies ==
- Otto Eberhardt Patronenfabrik, German World War II munitions and arms manufacturer

== See also ==
- Eberhard
- Eberhart (disambiguation)
