= Reverse charge =

Reverse charge may refer to:

- Reverse charge call or collect telephone call
- Charging a device's battery from another, charged, device; see Inductive charging § Electronic devices
