= Everett T. Moore =

Everett Thomson Moore
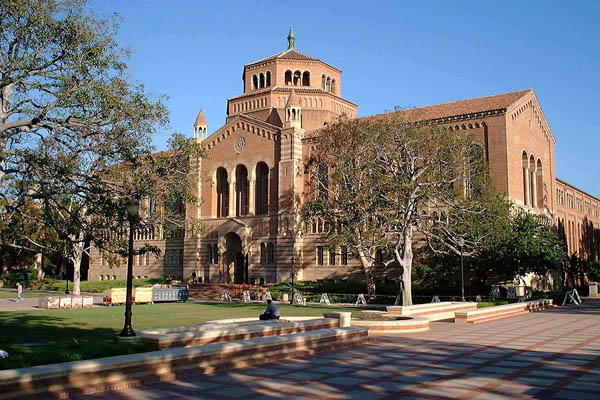
- Powell Library at UCLA
- Born: August 6, 1909; Highland Park, California
- Died: January 5, 1988 (aged 78)
- Occupations: Librarian, writer, educator
- Writing career
- Notable work: Freedom to Read Foundation activist

Everett Thomson Moore (August 6, 1909 – January 5, 1988) was an American librarian active in the Freedom to Read Foundation, which promoted intellectual freedom in libraries. Moore is most famous for challenging California's attorney general on issues of censorship and intellectual freedom in libraries in the case of Moore v. Younger. In 1999, American Libraries named him one of the "100 Most Important Leaders We Had in the 20th Century".

== Biography ==
Moore was born in Highland Park, California. He graduated from Occidental College in Los Angeles with a Bachelor of Arts in 1931 and went on to earn his Master of Arts in English from Harvard University in 1933. After teaching at The Webb School for several years, Moore earned his library science certificate from the University of California, Berkeley in 1939.

He worked as an academic librarian at the University of Illinois, University of California, Berkeley, and University of California, Los Angeles, eventually joining UCLA's School of Library Service faculty in 1961.

During World War II Moore served as a major in the United States Army. Stationed in the Southwest Pacific, he worked as an education officer under General Douglas MacArthur.

== Censorship after World War II ==
After World War II, censorship was often linked with patriotism. The McCarthy era and the Cold War had begun. Communist and leftist literature was frequently challenged, as was literature on feminism, sex education, critiques of capitalism, and civil rights. In Alabama, a controversial new law required "that every book used in college or public school...was to be labeled to indicate that the author was or was not an advocate of Communism..." Pressure was applied to New Jersey libraries by the Sons of the American Revolution for similar labeling. The group also insisted on an application of sorts to gain access to Communist literature which they felt "should not be freely available in libraries..." This "dark...very unfortunate chapter in American history" included public, private, or often secret interrogations of American citizens. Led by Wisconsin senator Joseph McCarthy, it was a modern-day witch hunt of sorts in that an individual American's intellectual thought was suspect and invoking the Fifth Amendment right was often detrimental. This is verified with McCarthy's interrogation of one New York City teacher:

According to the transcript, McCarthy asked an aide to transmit the testimony to the city's board of education. "I assume with this testimony they will discharge this man," McCarthy said. He turned to the teacher and added, "I may say your wife's testimony is being transmitted to the board of education also. I assume she will be discharged too."

Moore explores the story in Bartlesville, Oklahoma, of Free Public librarian Ruth Brown, in his book Issues of Freedom in American Libraries (1964). Moore states, "so many threats to the freedom to read occurred during the early 1950s." Although Brown was not under suspicion for being a Communist, she had included magazines such as the New Republic, The Nation and Soviet Russia Today in the library collection. A group called the Citizens' Committee filed a complaint which was investigated by the city. The City Commission sided with the Citizens' Committee but was unable to impose consequences, especially since Brown had the support of the library board. The City Commission repealed an ordinance that then allowed them to "assume control of the library." They were able to overrule the library board and fire Brown. Moore declares that although this particular story is all but forgotten, "her case did more...than any other in our time to shock librarians...into examining their beliefs in intellectual freedom."

McCarthyism fell out of favor after the "harsh treatment of Army officers", especially Colonel Chester T. Brown, who refused to answer questions. McCarthy stated, "Any man in the uniform of his country who refused to give information to a committee of the Senate which represents the American people, that man is not fit to wear the uniform of his country." "Such attacks infuriated President Eisenhower, who had been a high-ranking officer in World War II. McCarthy died three years after the unpopular 1954 Army–McCarthy hearings on May 2, 1957." Current Michigan Senator Carl Levin denounced McCarthyism, stating, "To attack people personally for their political beliefs and to browbeat them for asserting their rights, is no longer something which people are willingly engaged in..."

== Issues of Freedom in American Libraries ==
In Issues of Freedom in American Libraries (1964), Moore explores different circumstances of censorship in the United States. Moore notes the popularity in the Soviet Union of Ray Bradbury's book Fahrenheit 451. This book often came under attack in the US during the McCarthy era because it was believed to be a direct criticism of McCarthyism. This initially made the book quite popular in the USSR with some 500,000 unauthorized copies in circulation. The Soviets censored the book after they discovered it was actually a criticism of "tyranny over the mind at any time or place."

Moore continued his research on these issues and continued to be closely involved with libraries on a local and national level in the following capacities:
- President of California Library Association (1964)
- Member of the American Library Association Council (1962–1966)
- Chairman of the American Library Association Board (1966–1972)
- Editor of the Newsletter on the Intellectual Freedom (1960–1961)
- Associate university librarian at UCLA for Public Service, acting department head (1971–1973)
- Vice president of the Freedom to Read Foundation (? – 1974)

Moore was well aware that librarians would often be at the center of this debate and acknowledged the difficulty in differentiating between serious literature and what can fairly be described as obscene. In Moore's book, Issues of Freedom in American Libraries, he explores the divided opinions of these issues. Moore quoted Reverend Wright of Texas who stated that "all America's problems will be solved if he (i.e. Reverend Wright) will be permitted to select the books that should be read."

Some of the books Wright objected to included:

- George Orwell's Nineteen Eighty-Four
- John Steinbeck's The Grapes of Wrath
- Aldous Huxley's Brave New World

According to Moore, there are some psychiatrists, police officers and social workers who have insisted on the link between "reading obscene literature" and "criminality." It was often argued that "serious mental disorders or psychological" problems were at the root of the deviant behavior however these cases admittedly did not include "average adults."

Moore explored the flip side of this argument by referencing Justice William O. Douglas' pamphlet, Freedom of the Mind. Douglas questions why we "...would treat all adults as sick and unable to withstand exposure to the world of ideas." Douglas further questions why Communism is censored without even allowing US citizens to learn the principles of what it means. Why not educate ourselves instead of limit our knowledge? Douglas describes censorship as forcing, "the public to live up to the censor's code of morality..."

== Moore vs. Younger, 54 Cal. App. 3d 1122 (1976) ==
The case of Moore vs. Younger originated from a somewhat ambiguous law, California's Harmful Matter Statute. California Attorney General Evelle J. Younger "claimed that individual librarians could be prosecuted for giving juveniles access to questionable reading materials." Moore, as plaintiff, challenged the Attorney General through legal action. In February 1976, one month after he retired from UCLA, Moore won his case. All librarians in California were found to be exempt from the Harmful Matter Statute by the California Court of Appeals.

The court declares that it was the intention of the Legislature to provide librarians with exemption from application of the Harmful Matter Statute when acting in the discharge of their duties. The court declares alternatively that the availability and distribution of books at public and school libraries is necessarily always in furtherance of legitimate educational and scientific purposes.... And accordingly, librarians are not subject to prosecution under the Harmful Matter Statute for distributing library materials to minors in the course and scope of their duties as librarians.

Moore vs. Younger is still relevant today and was cited in 2001 in Kathleen R. vs. City of Livermore, 87 Cal. App. 4th 684 (Cal. App. 1st Dist. 2001). The case involved children and Internet instruction. The library stated, "We cannot presume that such instruction would include lessons on finding obscenity or other harmful matter on the Internet...such lessons would not further the library's stated mission."

Censorship is often a gray area and some lawyers have noted that in the United States it may not be possible to uphold certain laws, "without doing violence to due process of law and to the free-press provisions of the Constitution.

== Intellectual freedom ==
Moore died on January 5, 1988. Fellow librarian at the University of Illinois, Beverly P. Lynch described Moore:

The epitome of what we all strive to be as librarians: unassuming, yet exacting; intellectually demanding; precise in his work; both scholarly and humble...He respected every colleague, be they supervisor, peer, subordinate. He strove to make their work excellent through his own.

Moore's contribution to intellectual freedom and libraries is substantial. UCLA Librarian Gary E. Strong expressed what a "world-class research library" UCLA had become and praised those who helped: "You should know the names of John Goodman, Lawrence Clark Powell...Everett Moore, Seymour Lubetzky, Francis Clarke Sayers...Robert Vosper, Russell Shank and Robert Hayes..." Moore is also included in the American Libraries' list of "100 most important leaders we had in the 20th century."

When Everett Moore realized librarians were in danger of losing their full ability to "provide people with the information they request, not to judge the uses to which that information will be put" he took legal action to assure everyone had the opportunity to access "a universal collection of knowledge and creativity for future generations."

== Works by Everett T. Moore ==
- Issues of Freedom in American Libraries. (1964) Chicago: American Library Association Bulletin Volumes 54–57, June 1960 – June 1963.
- Papers in civil action of Everett T. Moore ... et al. against Evelle J. Younger, Attorney General of the State of California (1972)
- In the United States District Court, Central District of California, J. Dollen, Anita Iceman, American Library Association, California Library Association, ... J. Younger, defendant: Brief for Plaintiffs (1973)
- "A Rationale for Bookburners: A Further Word From Ray Bradbury," American Library Association Bulletin, May 1961, pp. 403–404 also In ALA Bulletin, Vol. 55, No. 5, May 1961. pp. 403–404.

== Works about Everett T. Moore ==
- Harlan, Robert D. (1978) The colonial printer: Two views: a paper read at a Clark Library Seminar on Intellectual Freedom, June 19, 1976, in honor of Everett T. Moore (William Andrews Clark Memorial Library seminar papers)
