= Roberta Everett =

British artist

- Born: Roberta Hatcher; 1906; Surrey
- Died: 1979 (aged 72–73); Harrow, London
- Education: Goldsmiths School of Art; City and Guilds of London Art School
- Known for: Sculpture

Roberta Alice Gordon Everett (née Roberta Hatcher; 29 May 1906 – 1979) was a British sculptor who produced busts and figures in bronze, clay and plaster.

== Biography ==
Everett was born in Surrey where she was raised by her mother, after her father died while she was still a young child. She attended the Wallington County School before studying at Goldsmiths School of Art in London and then at the City and Guilds of London Art School. Having gained her Art Teachers' Diploma, Everett began a teaching career alongside producing sculptures and other artworks. She taught art and crafts at schools and colleges at Brentwood in Essex and at Shoreditch and Bow in east London where she was the senior art mistress at the Coborn School for Girls from 1948 to 1950. As an artist, Everett worked in clay, plaster, stone and bronze to produce busts, heads and figures. She exhibited works at the Royal Academy in London between 1928 and 1949 and also at the Paris Salon and with the Royal Glasgow Institute of the Fine Arts and in Bradford. She lived at Hornchurch in Essex and then at Harrow in Middlesex, where she died in 1979.
