= Rev (company) =

Transcription service and company

- Industry: Transcription
- Founded: 2010; 15 years ago
- Founder: Dan Kokotov; David Abrameto; Jason Chicola; Josh Breinlinger; Mark Chen; Paul Huck
- Headquarters: Austin, Texas, U.S.
- Website: rev.com

Rev is an American speech-to-text company that provides closed captioning, subtitles, and transcription services. The company, based in San Francisco and Austin, was founded in 2010. PC Magazine named the service an "Editor's Choice" in 2018, and ranked it as the best transcription service of 2019.
