= Everett L. Shostrom =

American psychotherapist

Everett Leo Shostrom was an American psychotherapist. His approach to psychotherapy was eclectic, integrating a wide range of theory, practice, and research. He was perhaps most well known for his film Three Approaches to Psychotherapy and his famous book Man, the Manipulator. He also produced well known tests and inventories including the Personal Orientation Inventory, Personal Orientation Dimensions, the Pair Attraction Inventory, and the Caring Relationship Inventory.

== Three Approaches to Psychotherapy ==
Shostrom in 1965 produced a series of videoed therapy sessions between "Gloria", one of his patients, and three of the leading psychotherapists of that time; Carl Rogers, Fritz Perls and Albert Ellis. Each therapist took a different approach to help Gloria with her problems - in particular discussing her difficulty with being honest to her daughter Pam while dating men again since her divorce. The approaches taken by the three therapists were respectively Person-centered therapy, Gestalt therapy, and Rational Emotive Behavior Therapy. The film has been widely used as a training aid for counselors and therapists. Shostrom subsequently produced Three Approaches to Psychotherapy II in 1977 featuring himself as a therapist, Carl Rogers, and Arnold Lazarus with a client named Kathy. Shostrom then produced a third iteration of the training program with a focus on cognitive therapies with psychologists Hans Strupp, Donald Meichenbaum, and psychiatrist Aaron T. Beck with a client named Richard in 1986.

== Personal Orientation Inventory ==
The Personal Orientation Inventory is a system developed by Shostrom (1963) to measure factors related to self-actualisation. It uses 120 pairs of choice items to make up ten sub-scales. With these scales being designed to address various aspects of the systems of personal values being held by the subject. The instruments were chosen on the basis of value concepts which he saw as having wide personal and social relevance. His claim was that it is suitable for, and it has been used in, a wide range of different areas. These include colleges, businesses, clinics as well as with counselors.

== Selected publications ==
- Shostrom, E. L. (1967). Man, the manipulator: the inner journey from manipulation to actualization. Nashville, Abingdon Press.
- Brammer, L. M., & Shostrom, E. L. (1968). Therapeutic psychology; fundamentals of actualization counseling and psychotherapy. Englewood Cliffs, N.J., Prentice-Hall.
