= Everett (surname) =

Everett (anglicization of the Gaelic Eibhearard) is a surname. Notable people with the surname include:

== Entertainers ==
- Betty Everett (1939–2001), American soul singer, famous for her song "The Shoop Shoop Song (It's in His Kiss)"
- Bridget Everett (born 1972), American comedian
- Chad Everett (1936–2012), American actor
- Dylan Everett (born 1995), Canadian actor
- Geoff Everett, British guitarist and vocalist
- Kenny Everett (1944–1995), popular British entertainer
- Mark Oliver Everett (born 1963), US musician, founder of Eels
- Timmy Everett (1939–1977), American actor, dancer
- Rupert Everett (born 1959), British actor

== Politics and government ==
- A. Catherine Everett, Manitoba, Canada judge
- Alexander Hill Everett (1792–1847), American diplomatist, politician and man of letters
- Alfred Hart Everett (1848–1898), British colonial administrator and naturalist
- Edward Everett (1794–1865), American politician
- Fats Everett (1915–1969), American politician
- Garth Everett (1954–2023), American attorney and politician
- James Everett (politician) (1889–1967), senior Irish politician
- Ralph B. Everett (born 1951), president and chief executive officer of the Joint Center for Political and Economic Studies
- Robert Ashton Everett (1915–1969), American politician
- Robert W. Everett (1839–1915), American representative from Georgia
- Robinson O. Everett (1928–2009), American lawyer and judge
- Ron Everett, aka Maulana Karenga (born 1941), US political activist and social scientist
- Terry Everett (1937–2024), American politician
- William Everett (1839–1910), American politician

== Sports ==
- Adam Everett (born 1977), American baseball player
- Allan Everett (footballer) (1913–2003), Australian rules footballer
- Carl Everett (born 1971), American baseball player
- Danny Everett (born 1966), American runner
- Donny Everett (1997–2016), American baseball player
- Dudley Everett (1912–1943), Australian cricketer
- Gerald Everett (born 1994), American football player
- Harold Everett (1891–1979), English cricketer
- Jim Everett, (born 1963), American football player
- Jim Everett (Australian footballer) (1884–1968), Australian rules footballer
- Kevin Everett (born 1982), American football player
- Neil Everett (born 1962), US sports announcer
- Robert W. H. Everett (1901–1942), British jockey

== Other people ==
- Alexander Everett (1921–2005), British self-improvement and personal development consultant
- Alfred Hart Everett (1848–1898), British civil servant in Borneo and naturalist
- Amy "Dolly" Everett (2003–2018), Australian cyberbullying victim who took her life
- Barbara Everett (1932–2025), Canadian-born British academic and literary critic
- Bill Everett (1917–1973), American comic book writer
- Daniel Everett (born 1951), American linguistics professor
- Elizabeth Hawley Everett (1857–1940), American suffragist, author, and academic
- Frank Everett (1861–1920), Washington state pioneer and businessman
- H. D. Everett (1851–1923), British female novelist
- Hugh Everett III (1930–1982), US physicist, quantum mechanics theorist
- John R. Everett (1918–1992), American college president
- Joseph David Everett (1831–1904), English physicist, professor, and writer
- Joy Everett (born 1953), Australian botanist
- Julian F. Everett (1869–1955), American architect
- Minnie Everett (1874–1956), Australian ballet and operetta producer
- Percival Everett (born 1956), American novelist
- Robert Everett (computer science) (1921–2018), computer scientist (MIT, Mitre)
- Roberta Everett (1906–1979), English artist
- Raymond Everett Lisle (1910–1994), American attorney, officer in the US Foreign Service, and Dean of Brooklyn Law School
- Sylvester T. Everett (1838-1922), American financier

== Fictional characters ==
- Lee Everett, the playable character in the video game The Walking Dead
- Morgan Everett, character in the video game Deus Ex

== See also ==
- John Everet, highwayman in Everet v Williams, 1700s English court case about contracts to commit crimes
- Evert, surname
