= Everhard =

Everhard is both a surname and a masculine given name, a variant of Eberhard. People with the name include:

Surname:

- Erik Everhard (1976), stage name of Mitchell Hartwell, a Canadian pornographic actor and director
- Nancy Everhard (1957), American former actress

Given name:

- Everhard Jabach (1618–1695), French businessman, art collector and director of the French East India Company
