= Everett Township, Dodge County, Nebraska =

Everett Township
- Township
- Location in Dodge County
- Coordinates: 41°36′35″N 096°36′57″W
- Country: United States
- State: Nebraska
- County: Dodge

Area
  - Total: 35.98 sq mi (93.18 km^{2})
  - Land: 35.56 sq mi (92.09 km^{2})
  - Water: 0.42 sq mi (1.09 km^{2}) 1.17%
- Elevation: 1,293 ft (394 m)

Population (2020)
  - Total: 227
  - Density: 6.38/sq mi (2.46/km^{2})
- GNIS feature ID: 0837996

Everett Township is one of fourteen townships in Dodge County, Nebraska, United States. The population was 227 at the 2020 census. A 2021 estimate placed the township's population at 221.

A small portion of the Village of Hooper lies within the Township.

Everett Township was organized in 1871.

== See also ==
- County government in Nebraska
