= Frederick Eberhardt (philosopher) =

American philosopher (born 1978)

Fredrick Eberhardt
- Born: 1978 (age 47–48)

Education
- Education: London School of Economics (BS), Carnegie Mellon University (MS, PhD)

Philosophical work
- Era: 21st-century philosophy
- Region: Western philosophy
- Institutions: California Institute of Technology, Washington University in St. Louis
- Main interests: philosophy of science
- Website: http://www.its.caltech.edu/~fehardt/index.html

Fredrick Eberhardt (born 1978) is an American philosopher and professor of philosophy at the California Institute of Technology. Previously he was a faculty member in the Philosophy-Neuroscience-Psychology program at Washington University in St. Louis. Eberhardt is known for his works on philosophy of science.
