= Everett McCorvey =

American opera singer (born 1957)

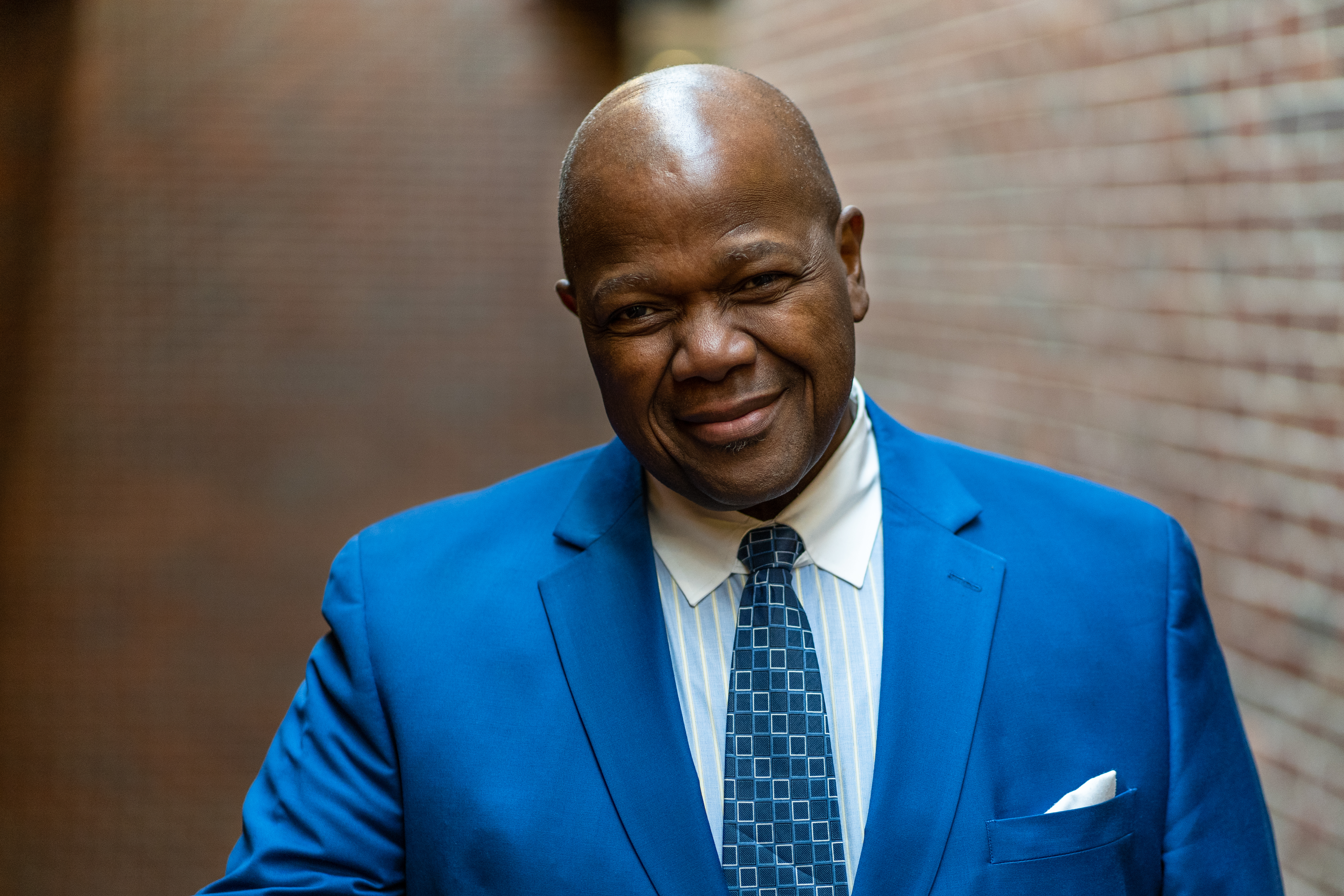
McCorvey in 2020

Everett McCorvey (born 1957) is an American classical tenor, teacher, impresario, conductor and producer, living in Lexington, Kentucky, where he holds an Endowed Chair in Opera Studies at the University of Kentucky, is director of the University of Kentucky Opera Theatre and Professor of Voice. He is also the founder and conductor of the American Spiritual Ensemble, Artistic Director of the National Chorale and President of Global Creative Connections, a production company producing live public and private events. He has also been on faculty at the American Institute of Musical Studies in Graz, Austria, the Opera Theatre of St. Louis, and the Bay View Music Festival in Bay View, Michigan. His students have won numerous national and international singing competitions and regularly perform at leading houses throughout the world.

McCorvey, a native of Montgomery, Alabama, received his degrees from the University of Alabama, including a Doctorate of Musical Arts. He founded the American Spiritual Ensemble in 1995, a group of classically trained singers that tours nationally and internationally performing American spirituals.

Since 2014 McCorvey has been artistic director and principal conductor of the National Chorale of New York City, a symphonic choir which performs the great choral titans of the choral literature at Lincoln Center.

McCorvey has sung with the Metropolitan Opera in New York, at the Kennedy Center in Washington, D.C., and at other houses in the United States and abroad. He performs regularly as a soloist and with his wife, soprano Alicia Helm, and has been a guest conductor for orchestras and vocal groups throughout the United States and in other countries.

== Early life and education ==
Everett David McCorvey was born in Montgomery, Alabama, on December 3, 1957, to David and Olga McCorvey, a postal worker and librarian. He grew up during the Civil Rights Movement. His father was a deacon at First Baptist Church where Ralph Abernathy was the minister. Martin Luther King Jr. lived in the same neighborhood. "The whole Civil Rights movement of the '60s was part of my life", he said in a 2015 profile by Creative Lexington. McCorvey recalled some of his childhood experiences of racism in an interview in 2020 that was broadcast on WUKY. The grade school he attended was across the street from a church where Civil Rights leaders were meeting, he said, and as a second grader he saw troopers "go up into the church on horseback and beat everybody out of the church".

Neither parent was involved in the arts but McCorvey explained in a 2011 National Endowment for the Arts Art Works interview that his family housed students who attended the local historically black college, Alabama State Teacher's College, and that his love of music began at age eight when he heard one of them practice the trumpet. McCorvey graduated from Jefferson Davis High School in Montgomery in 1975 then attended the University of Alabama in Tuscaloosa, receiving a Bachelor of Music in Vocal Performance in 1979, a Master of Music, with an emphasis on vocal performance and choral conducting, in 1981, and Doctor of Musical Arts in Vocal Performance in 1989, with a dissertation on The Art Songs of Black American Composers. In 2015 he was recognized with the Alabama Distinguished Artist Award, which honors a professional artist who "has earned significant national acclaim for their art over an extended period".

== Teaching ==
McCorvey joined the faculty of the University of Kentucky in 1991 as an assistant professor of voice. He was named a full professor of voice in 1997 and became the director and executive producer of the University of Kentucky Opera Theatre that year. Since 2006 he has held the Lexington Opera Society Endowed Chair in Opera Studies. Prior to U.K., he taught at Knoxville College (1989–1991), at Newtown High School in Queens, New York (1985–1986) and at Shelton State Community College in Tuscaloosa (1980–1983.)

Two of McCorvey's students have won the National Metropolitan Opera Auditions (Gregory Turay, 1995 and Reginald Smith Jr., 2015) and several have performed at the Met as well as other leading opera houses in the United States and Europe. Former students also include Broadway performers, movie and television actors: Reshma Shetty, Phumzile Sojola, Andrea Jones Sojola and Jennifer Fair.

== Performance ==
McCorvey lived and worked in New York where he was cast in the 1983 revival of Porgy and Bess at Radio City Music Hall.

He has performed in many venues in the United States, Mexico, China and Europe, including the Metropolitan Opera, the Kennedy Center, Teatro Comunale in Florence, Italy, and Queen Elizabeth Hall in London, England.

== American Spiritual Ensemble ==
McCorvey founded the American Spiritual Ensemble in 1995, a group of about two dozen professional singers performing spirituals and other compositions of African American composers with the mission of keeping the American Negro Spiritual alive. "I began to realize this great spiritual tradition was being lost . ... So I wanted to try to preserve these spirituals." McCorvey said in a 2018 interview with the Associated Press, "While slavery is no longer legal, people are still enslaved in a lot of ways—they can be a slave to drugs, to alcohol, to abuse—and what happens is these songs with messages give us a way out. They're powerful, and the way they make you feel is empowered."

The group has presented over 400 concerts including 18 tours of the United States and 16 tours of Spain. The American Spiritual Ensemble has released several CDs and has been featured in two U.S. Public Broadcasting System (PBS) broadcasts, The Spirituals and a special concert featuring the American Spiritual Ensemble.

Composer Paul Carey wrote of an ASE performance in Memphis, Tennessee, that it was "one of the greatest concerts I have ever heard... McCorvey himself is an impressive conductor and interpreter of this music, his conducting being about the rhythms, sub-rhythms, and the importance of beat weight of this music; he also brings out word stresses and inflections that lesser conductors would never even think of."

== Conducting ==
McCorvey studied conducting under Frederick Prentice at the University of Alabama and has since worked extensively with Robert Baldwin, now at the University of Utah, and John Nardolillo at the University of Kentucky. In addition to conducting the American Spiritual Ensemble on tour and the National Chorale at Lincoln Center, McCorvey's guest conducting stints have included the Mythos Opera Festival in Taormina, Sicily, and the North Czech Philharmonic in Prague, Czech Republic. In 2019 McCorvey joined the board of directors of the International Conductors Guild, which represents over 1,100 symphony, band and choral conductors worldwide. In September 2021 McCorvey conducted the National Chorale and the Field Band and Soldiers' chorus in a concert commemorating the 20th anniversary of the attacks on the World Trade Center at Liberty State Park in New Jersey. He conducted the world premiere of Stella Sung's operatic adaptation of Marjorie Kinnan Rawlings' The Secret River, with libretto by Mark Campbell at Opera Orlando in December, 2021.

== Producing ==
As director of the University of Kentucky Opera Theatre, McCorvey has produced over 40 operas, including world premieres of River of Time, Our Lincoln, Hotel Casablanca and God Bless Us Everyone by Thomas Pasatieri, and Bounce – The Basketball Opera. Under McCorvey UKOT has also staged the first university productions of The Little Prince by Rachel Portman, A Streetcar Named Desire by André Previn and Silent Night by Kevin Puts. Annually since 1992 he has produced, been the musical director for and sung in "It's a Grand Night for Singing", a Broadway Review concert of song and dance that includes popular and classical numbers performed by students, faculty and community members. The production has expanded from one performance originally to six over two weekends.

McCorvey is also the music director of New York's Messiah Sing-In at Lincoln Center

McCorvey served as the executive director of the 2010 Alltech FEI World Equestrian Games in Lexington,

== Personal ==
McCorvey is married to Alicia Helm and they have three children, Elizabeth, Julia and David

== Honors and awards ==
- McCorvey was the 2018 recipient of the University of Kentucky Libraries Medallion for Intellectual Achievement Award.
- 2020 SEC Faculty Achievement Award for the University of Kentucky
- 2015 Alabama Governor's Artists Award Recipient

== Recordings ==
- 2016 Stand the Storm Jeryl Cunningham-Fleming, soprano, Everett McCorvey, producer
- 2014 The American Spiritual Ensemble Live at the American Cathedral in Paris CD & DVD Everett McCorvey, conductor, Michel Violet
- 2013 Been In The Storm So Long Negro Spirituals and Arts Songs, Kenneth Overton, baritone; Everett McCorvey, producer
- 2013 L ost Melodies Hope Koehler Performs Songs of John Jacob Niles, Hope Koehler soprano, James Douglass, piano, Everett McCorvey, producer
- 2011 Swing Low Sweet Chariot The American Spiritual Ensemble, Everett McCorvey, producer
- 2010 Die Fledermaus UK Opera Theatre, Everett McCorvey, producer – Albany Records
- 2010 The Spirit of the Holidays, The American Spiritual Ensemble, Everett McCorvey, producer
- 2008 The Lass from the Low Countree: Songs of John Jacob Niles Hope Koehler, soprano, James Douglass, piano, Everett McCorvey, producer – Albany Records
- 2008 The Hotel Casablanca UK Opera Theatre, Everett McCorvey, producer – Albany Records
- 2006 The Spirituals The American Spiritual Ensemble, Everett McCorvey, producer
- 2002 The American Soloist Julius P. Williams, conductor, Everett McCorvey, tenor – Albany Records
- 2004 Mosaic Angela Brown, soprano, Everett McCorvey, producer – Albany Records
- 2003 Lily of the Valley The American Spiritual Ensemble, Everett McCorvey, producer
- 2001 It's A Grand Night for Singing! A Gershwin Celebration, Everett McCorvey, producer
- 2001 The Tender Land UK Opera Theatre, Kirk Trevor, conductor, Everett McCorvey, producer – Albany Records
- 2000 Ol' Time Religion, The American Spiritual Ensemble, Everett McCorvey, producer
- 1997 Symphonic Brotherhood Music of African-American Composers, Julius Williams, conductor, Everett McCorvey, tenor – Albany Records
- 1998 On My Journey Now The American Spiritual Ensemble, Everett McCorvey, conductor and producer
- 1997 It's A Grand Night for Singing! The First 5 Years, Everett McCorvey, producer

== Video and DVD releases ==
- 2017 It's a Grand Night for Singing: 25th Anniversary – Kentucky Education Television (KET) producer
- 2014 The American Spiritual Ensemble Live at the American Cathedral in Paris DVD
- 2011 The Opening Ceremony, 2012 Alltech FEI World Equestrian Games – DVD of the opening ceremonies of the Alltech 2010 FEI World Equestrian Games, produced by Global Creative Connections and filmed by NBC Sports.
- 2007 The Spirituals – A co-production of Dos Vatos Productions, Kentucky Educational Television (KET), and the Independent Television Service (ITVS), with funding provided by the Corporation for Public Broadcasting.
- 2005 A Tribute and a Toast to Opera – Kentucky Education Television (KET) producer
- 2002 It's a Grand Night for Singing: 10th Anniversary – Kentucky Education Television (KET) producer
- 2001 Impresario – Bringing Talent to the Stage – showcasing the talents of Everett McCorvey, Dos Vatos Production

== Board memberships ==
- 2019 – Present: International Conductors Guild Board of Directors
- 2013 – 2019: Baptist Seminary of Kentucky (Chairman 2016–2019)
- 2009 – 2011: University of Kentucky Board of Trustees
- 2004 – Present Vice-chair, Kentucky Arts Council
- 1998 – 2010: National Opera Association

== University service ==
- 2013–present: Strategic planning committee
- 2011 Presidential Search Committee
- 2009–2011: UK Board of Trustees
- 1999 Chair – President's Convocation in commemoration of 50 Years of African Americans at the University of Kentucky, culminated in visit by Archbishop Desmond Tutu.
