= Athletics at the 1924 Summer Olympics – Men's pentathlon =

Men's pentathlon at the Games of the VIII Olympiad
- Venue: Stade Olympique Yves-du-Manoir
- Date: July 7, 1924
- Competitors: 30 from 17 nations

Medalists
1st place, gold medalist(s)		Eero Lehtonen; Finland
2nd place, silver medalist(s)		Elemér Somfay; Hungary
3rd place, bronze medalist(s)		Robert LeGendre; United States

The men's pentathlon event was part of the track and field athletics programme at the 1924 Summer Olympics. It was the third and last appearance of a pentathlon at the Olympics. The competition was held on Monday, July 7, 1924. Thirty pentathletes from 17 nations competed.

== Records ==
Robert LeGendre set a new world record in long jump during this competition. He improved the old records:

World Record	7.69	(United States) Edward Gourdin	Cambridge (GBR)	July 23, 1923
Olympic Record	7.60	(United States) Albert Gutterson	Stockholm (SWE)	July 12, 1912

== Results ==
=== Long jump ===
The long jump was the first event and started at 2:00 p.m.

Group 1

Place	Athlete	Width	Overall Rank
1	Robert LeGendre (USA)	7.765 WR	1
2	Brutus Hamilton (USA)	6.83	4
3	Elemér Somfay (HUN)	6.77	5
4	Eero Lehtonen (FIN)	6.68	7
5	Denis Duigan (AUS)	6.545	9
6	Gaston Médécin (MON)	6.49	10
7	Evert Nilsson (SWE)	6.40	13
8	Iivari Yrjölä (FIN)	6.25	18
9	Constant Bucher (SUI)	6.17	21
10	Roger Viel (FRA)	5.92	25
11	Fred Zinner (BEL)	5.88	26
12	Georgios Zakharopoulos (GRE)	5.485	27
13	Percy Spark (GBR)	5.29	30

Group 2

Place	Athlete	Width	Overall Rank
1	Mort Kaer (USA)	6.96	2
2	Hugo Lahtinen (FIN)	6.895	3
3	Leo Leino (FIN)	6.72	6
4	Göran Unger (SWE)	6.56	8
5	Clifford Argue (USA)	6.46	11
6	Donald Slack (GBR)	6.43	12
7	Josse Ruth (BEL)	6.38	14
8	Aleksa Spahić (YUG)	6.32	15
9	Léon Courtejaire (FRA)	6.29	16
10	Albino Pighi (ITA)	6.25	17
11	Martin Mølster (NOR)	6.20	19
12	Harry de Keijser (NED)	6.19	20
13	Seiichi Ueda (JPN)	6.05	22
14	Adolfo Contoli (ITA)	5.99	23
15	Bertil Fastén (SWE)	5.98	24
16	Antonín Svoboda (TCH)	5.37	28
17	Stelios Benardis (GRE)	5.345	29

=== Javelin throw ===
The javelin throw was the second event and started at 2:45 p.m.

Group 1

Place	Athlete	Width	Overall Rank
1	Elemér Somfay (HUN)	52.07	2
2	Iivari Yrjölä (FIN)	51.72	3
3	Evert Nilsson (SWE)	51.17	4
4	Eero Lehtonen (FIN)	50.93	5
5	Georgios Zakharopoulos (GRE)	49.00	7
6	Brutus Hamilton (USA)	48.96	8
7	Robert LeGendre (USA)	48.04	11
8	Denis Duigan (AUS)	45.60	16
9	Roger Viel (FRA)	42.58	19
10	Percy Spark (GBR)	41.19	21
11	Fred Zinner (BEL)	40.15	22
12	Constant Bucher (SUI)	38.95	24
13	Gaston Médécin (MON)	32.43	29

Group 2

Place	Athlete	Width	Overall Rank
1	Leo Leino (FIN)	54.12	1
2	Mort Kaer (USA)	50.20	6
3	Hugo Lahtinen (FIN)	48.76	9
4	Göran Unger (SWE)	48.45	10
5	Martin Mølster (NOR)	47.91	12
6	Bertil Fastén (SWE)	47.58	13
7	Léon Courtejaire (FRA)	47.58	14
8	Seiichi Ueda (JPN)	47.47	15
9	Harry de Keijser (NED)	44.07	17
10	Adolfo Contoli (ITA)	42.98	18
11	Clifford Argue (USA)	41.48	20
12	Albino Pighi (ITA)	39.82	23
13	Antonín Svoboda (TCH)	37.88	25
14	Josse Ruth (BEL)	36.78	26
15	Stelios Benardis (GRE)	35.58	27
16	Donald Slack (GBR)	34.18	28
17	Aleksa Spahić (YUG)	31.00	30

=== 200 metres ===
The third event was the 200 metres. The heats started at 3:45 p.m.

Heat 1

Place	Athlete	Time	Overall Rank
1	Clifford Argue (USA)	23.4	=5
2	Roger Viel (FRA)	23.8	=8
3	Evert Nilsson (SWE)	25.0	=21

Heat 2

Place	Athlete	Time	Overall Rank
1	Mort Kaer (USA)	23.0	=1
2	Denis Duigan (AUS)	23.8	=8
3	Fred Zinner (BEL)	25.2	24

Heat 3

Place	Athlete	Time	Overall Rank
1	Brutus Hamilton (USA)	24.4	=18
2	Aleksa Spahić (YUG)	25.0	=21
—	Georgios Zakharopoulos (GRE)	DNS	—

Heat 4

Place	Athlete	Time	Overall Rank
1	Eero Lehtonen (FIN)	23.0	=1
2	Donald Slack (GBR)	23.8	=8
3	Constant Bucher (SUI)	24.4	=18

Heat 5

Place	Athlete	Time	Overall Rank
1	Adolfo Contoli (ITA)	23.8	=8
2	Göran Unger (SWE)	23.8	=8
3	Percy Spark (GBR)	27.0	28

Heat 6

Place	Athlete	Time	Overall Rank
1	Elemér Somfay (HUN)	23.4	=5
2	Antonín Svoboda (TCH)	24.0	=13
3	Harry de Keijser (NED)	24.2	=15

Heat 7

Place	Athlete	Time	Overall Rank
1	Josse Ruth (BEL)	24.2	=15
2	Seiichi Ueda (JPN)	25.4	25
—	Iivari Yrjölä (FIN)	DNS	—

Heat 8

Place	Athlete	Time	Overall Rank
1	Robert LeGendre (USA)	23.0	=1
2	Hugo Lahtinen (FIN)	23.8	7
3	Léon Courtejaire (FRA)	24.6	20

Heat 9

Place	Athlete	Time	Overall Rank
1	Martin Mølster (NOR)	24.2	=15
2	Bertil Fastén (SWE)	25.8	26
3	Stelios Benardis (GRE)	26.2	27

Heat 10

Place	Athlete	Time	Overall Rank
1	Leo Leino (FIN)	23.4	=5
2	Gaston Médécin (MON)	24.0	=13
3	Albino Pighi (ITA)	25.0	=21

Standings after three events

After these three events only the top twelve competitors were allowed to participate in the following discus throw contest.

Place	Athlete	Long jump	Javelin	200 m	Total
1	Mort Kaer (USA)	2	6	1	9
2	Leo Leino (FIN)	6	1	4	11
3	Elemér Somfay (HUN)	5	2	5	12
4	Eero Lehtonen (FIN)	7	5	1	13
4	Robert LeGendre (USA)	1	11	1	13
6	Hugo Lahtinen (FIN)	3	9	7	19
7	Göran Unger (SWE)	8	10	8	26
8	Brutus Hamilton (USA)	4	8	18	30
9	Denis Duigan (AUS)	9	16	8	33
10	Clifford Argue (USA)	11	20	5	36
11	Evert Nilsson (SWE)	13	4	21	38
12	Martin Mølster (NOR)	19	12	15	46
13	Donald Slack (GBR)	12	28	8	48
14	Adolfo Contoli (ITA)	23	18	8	49
14	Léon Courtejaire (FRA)	16	13	20	49
16	Roger Viel (FRA)	25	19	8	52
16	Gaston Médécin (MON)	10	29	13	52
16	Harry de Keijser (NED)	20	17	15	52
19	Josse Ruth (BEL)	14	26	15	55
20	Albino Pighi (ITA)	17	23	21	61
21	Seiichi Ueda (JPN)	22	15	25	62
22	Constant Bucher (SUI)	21	24	18	63
22	Bertil Fastén (SWE)	24	13	26	63
24	Aleksa Spahić (YUG)	15	30	21	66
24	Antonín Svoboda (TCH)	27	25	13	66
26	Fred Zinner (BEL)	26	22	24	72
27	Percy Spark (GBR)	30	21	28	79
28	Stelios Benardis (GRE)	29	27	27	83
—	Iivari Yrjölä (FIN)	18	3	—	DNF
—	Georgios Zakharopoulos (GRE)	27	7	—	DNF

After the determination of the twelve competitors who will participate in the next event all other results from the non-qualified pentathletes were deleted. This gave the following order and current standing at this point of the competition:

Place	Athlete	Long jump	Javelin	200 m	Total
1	Mort Kaer (USA)	2	5	1	8
2	Robert LeGendre (USA)	1	9	1	11
2	Leo Leino (FIN)	6	1	4	11
4	Eero Lehtonen (FIN)	7	4	1	12
4	Elemér Somfay (HUN)	5	2	5	12
6	Hugo Lahtinen (FIN)	3	7	7	17
7	Brutus Hamilton (USA)	4	6	11	21
8	Göran Unger (SWE)	8	8	8	24
9	Evert Nilsson (SWE)	11	3	12	26
10	Clifford Argue (USA)	10	12	5	27
11	Denis Duigan (AUS)	9	9	11	28
12	Martin Mølster (NOR)	12	10	10	32

Eero Lehtonen and Elemér Somfay later gold and silver medalists tied in fourth place after three events. The biggest winner of the deletion of the results from the non-qualified competitors was Robert LeGendre. He came up from fourth and second place. The biggest loss had Denis Duigan who came from ninth back to eleventh.

=== Discus throw ===
The discus throw was the fourth event and started at 4:30 p.m.

The leader after three events Mort Kaer was able to finish only in tenth place. While Eero Lehtonen, Olympic champion in pentathlon at the 1920 Games, won the discus throw competition.

Place	Athlete	Width
1	Eero Lehtonen (FIN)	40.44
2	Elemér Somfay (HUN)	37.76
3	Brutus Hamilton (USA)	37.70
4	Robert LeGendre (USA)	36.76
5	Hugo Lahtinen (FIN)	36.08
6	Göran Unger (SWE)	35.11
7	Martin Mølster (NOR)	34.69
8	Leo Leino (FIN)	33.62
9	Evert Nilsson (SWE)	33.45
10	Mort Kaer (USA)	32.70
11	Denis Duigan (AUS)	27.26
—	Clifford Argue (USA)	DNS

After the fourth event again only the best six pentathletes from the overall standings advanced to the last contest. Mort Kaer who only managed to finish in tenth place in the discus throw came back to fourth place overall - enough to participate in the final 1500 metres run. Brutus Hamilton who finished third in the discus throw did not improve his seventh place overall and failed to qualify for the 1500 metres run. So the first six places were unchanged and three Finns, two US-Americans, and one Hungarian started in the final.

Place	Athlete	Long jump	Javelin	200 m	Discus	Total
1	Eero Lehtonen (FIN)	7	4	1	1	13
2	Elemér Somfay (HUN)	5	2	5	2	14
3	Robert LeGendre (USA)	1	9	1	4	15
4	Mort Kaer (USA)	2	5	1	10	18
5	Leo Leino (FIN)	6	1	4	1	19
6	Hugo Lahtinen (FIN)	3	7	7	5	22
7	Brutus Hamilton (USA)	4	6	11	3	24
8	Göran Unger (SWE)	8	8	8	6	30
9	Evert Nilsson (SWE)	11	3	12	9	35
10	Denis Duigan (AUS)	9	9	11	11	39
10	Martin Mølster (NOR)	12	10	10	7	39
—	Clifford Argue (USA)	10	12	5	DNS	DNF

At this point of the competition the results from the non-qualified competitors were not deleted so the results stand for the final event.

=== 1500 metres ===
The 1500 metres run was the fifth and final event and started at 5:15 p.m.

Place	Athlete	Time
1	Eero Lehtonen (FIN)	4:47.1
2	Elemér Somfay (HUN)	4:48.4
3	Robert LeGendre (USA)	4:52.6
4	Leo Leino (FIN)	4:55.4
5	Hugo Lahtinen (FIN)	4:55.6
6	Mort Kaer (USA)	5:38.6

== Final standings ==
The medal ranks were unchanged after the 1500 metres run. Eero Lehtonen was able to win his second gold medal in Olympic pentathlon. He also became the last Olympic champion in pentathlon as this event was discontinued. The new world record holder in long jump Robert LeGendre finished third and won the bronze medal. He would have won the gold medal if this contest were scored by points tables. But his ninth place in the javelin throw pushed him back. And he did not participate in the Olympic long jump event held the next day, because he did not compete in this event at the US Olympic trials.

Place	Athlete	Long jump	Javelin	200 m	Discus	1500 m	Total
1	Eero Lehtonen (FIN)	7	4	1	1	1	14
2	Elemér Somfay (HUN)	5	2	5	2	2	16
3	Robert LeGendre (USA)	1	9	1	4	3	18
4	Leo Leino (FIN)	6	1	4	1	4	23
5	Mort Kaer (USA)	2	5	1	10	6	24
6	Hugo Lahtinen (FIN)	3	7	7	5	5	27
