= Athletics at the 1924 Summer Olympics – Men's decathlon =

Men's decathlon at the Games of the VIII Olympiad
- Venue: Stade Olympique Yves-du-Manoir
- Date: 11–12 July 1924
- Competitors: 36 from 22 nations

Medalists
1st place, gold medalist(s)		Harold Osborn; United States
2nd place, silver medalist(s)		Emerson Norton; United States
3rd place, bronze medalist(s)		Aleksander Klumberg; Estonia

The men's decathlon event was part of the track and field athletics programme at the 1924 Summer Olympics. It was the fourth appearance of a decathlon at the Olympics. The competition was held on Friday, 11 July, and Saturday, 12 July 1924. Thirty-six decathletes from 22 nations competed.

== Results ==
=== 100 meters ===
This event was held on 11 July 1924.

Rank	Athlete	Country	Time	Points
1	Harold Osborn	United States	11.2	857.2
2	Constant Bucher	Switzerland	11.4	809.6
2	Enrique Thompson	Argentina	11.4	809.6
2	Ernst Gerspach	Switzerland	11.4	809.6
2	Gabriel Sempé	France	11.4	809.6
2	Gvido Jekals	Latvia	11.4	809.6
2	Harry de Keijser	Netherlands	11.4	809.6
8	Adolf Meier	Switzerland	11.6	762.0
8	Adolfo Contoli	Italy	11.6	762.0
8	Aleksander Klumberg	Estonia	11.6	762.0
8	Donald Slack	Great Britain	11.6	762.0
8	Ernest Sutherland	South Africa	11.6	762.0
8	Elemér Somfay	Hungary	11.6	762.0
8	Emerson Norton	United States	11.6	762.0
8	Harry Frieda	United States	11.6	762.0
8	Helge Jansson	Sweden	11.6	762.0
8	Tokushige Noto	Japan	11.6	762.0
8	Gaston Médécin	Monaco	11.6	762.0
8	Édouard Armand	Haiti	11.6	762.0
20	Antoni Cejzik	Poland	11.8	714.4
20	Denis Duigan	Australia	11.8	714.4
20	Elmar Rähn	Estonia	11.8	714.4
20	Eugen Uuemaa	Estonia	11.8	714.4
20	Josse Ruth	Belgium	11.8	714.4
20	Paavo Yrjölä	Finland	11.8	714.4
20	Peroslav Ferković	Yugoslavia	11.8	714.4
20	Valter Ever	Estonia	11.8	714.4
20	Bill Shanahan	Ireland	11.8	714.4
20	Otto Anderson	United States	11.8	714.4
30	Antti Huusari	Finland	12.0	666.8
30	Bertil Fastén	Sweden	12.0	666.8
30	Iivari Yrjölä	Finland	12.0	666.8
33	Evert Nilsson	Sweden	12.2	619.2
33	Stelios Benardis	Greece	12.2	619.2
35	Ðuro Gašpar	Yugoslavia	12.6	524.0
36	Percy Spark	Great Britain	12.8	476.4

=== Long jump ===
This event was held on 11 July 1924.

Rank	Athlete	Country	Distance (m)	Points
1	Aleksander Klumberg	Estonia	6.96	843.200
2	Emerson Norton	United States	6.92	833.400
2	Harold Osborn	United States	6.92	833.400
4	Ernest Sutherland	South Africa	6.67	772.150
5	Gaston Médécin	Monaco	6.52	735.400
6	Iivari Yrjölä	Finland	6.50	730.500
7	Eugen Uuemaa	Estonia	6.49	728.050
8	Gvido Jekals	Latvia	6.48	725.600
9	Ernst Gerspach	Switzerland	6.46	720.700
10	Valter Ever	Estonia	6.45	718.250
11	Tokushige Noto	Japan	6.42	710.900
12	Elemér Somfay	Hungary	6.40	706.000
12	Evert Nilsson	Sweden	6.40	706.000
14	Édouard Armand	Haiti	6.385	702.325
15	Adolfo Contoli	Italy	6.37	698.650
16	Helge Jansson	Sweden	6.32	686.400
17	Josse Ruth	Belgium	6.31	683.950
17	Paavo Yrjölä	Finland	6.31	683.950
19	Elmar Rähn	Estonia	6.27	674.150
20	Bill Shanahan	Ireland	6.20	657.000
21	Bertil Fastén	Sweden	6.18	652.100
22	Adolf Meier	Switzerland	6.175	650.875
23	Peroslav Ferković	Yugoslavia	6.17	649.650
24	Antti Huusari	Finland	6.16	647.200
25	Constant Bucher	Switzerland	6.12	637.400
26	Enrique Thompson	Argentina	6.10	632.500
27	Gabriel Sempé	France	6.08	627.600
28	Denis Duigan	Australia	6.03	615.350
29	Harry de Keijser	Netherlands	6.00	608.000
30	Donald Slack	Great Britain	5.98	603.100
31	Harry Frieda	United States	5.94	593.300
32	Stelios Benardis	Greece	5.70	534.500
33	Antoni Cejzik	Poland	5.68	529.600
34	Ðuro Gašpar	Yugoslavia	5.305	437.725
35	Percy Spark	Great Britain	5.17	404.650
–	Otto Anderson	United States	No mark	0

=== Shot put ===
This event was held 11 July 1924.

Rank	Athlete	Country	Distance (m)	Points
1	Paavo Yrjölä	Finland	13.28	794.0
2	Iivari Yrjölä	Finland	13.08	774.0
3	Emerson Norton	United States	13.04	770.0
4	Aleksander Klumberg	Estonia	12.27	693.0
5	Helge Jansson	Sweden	12.22	688.0
6	Antti Huusari	Finland	12.025	668.5
7	Antoni Cejzik	Poland	11.875	653.5
8	Harold Osborn	United States	11.435	609.5
9	Bertil Fastén	Sweden	11.415	607.5
10	Harry de Keijser	Netherlands	11.31	597.0
11	Gaston Médécin	Monaco	11.295	595.5
12	Harry Frieda	United States	11.01	567.0
13	Ðuro Gašpar	Yugoslavia	10.95	561
14	Valter Ever	Estonia	10.90	556.0
15	Ernest Sutherland	South Africa	10.865	552.5
16	Percy Spark	Great Britain	10.86	552.0
17	Peroslav Ferković	Yugoslavia	10.56	522.0
18	Elemér Somfay	Hungary	10.555	521.5
19	Adolfo Contoli	Italy	10.54	520.0
20	Gvido Jekals	Latvia	10.41	507.0
21	Ernst Gerspach	Switzerland	10.355	501.5
22	Enrique Thompson	Argentina	10.345	500.5
23	Gabriel Sempé	France	10.335	499.5
24	Evert Nilsson	Sweden	10.095	475.5
25	Adolf Meier	Switzerland	10.00	466.0
26	Stelios Benardis	Greece	9.895	455.5
27	Denis Duigan	Australia	9.735	439.5
28	Constant Bucher	Switzerland	9.71	437.0
29	Eugen Uuemaa	Estonia	9.63	429.0
30	Bill Shanahan	Ireland	9.615	427.5
31	Tokushige Noto	Japan	9.555	421.5
32	Elmar Rähn	Estonia	9.525	418.5
33	Donald Slack	Great Britain	8.765	342.5
34	Josse Ruth	Belgium	8.74	340.0
35	Édouard Armand	Haiti	8.65	331.0

=== High jump ===
This event was held 11 July 1924.

Rank	Athlete	Country	Height (m)	Points
1	Harold Osborn	United States	1.97	1056
2	Emerson Norton	United States	1.92	986
3	Helge Jansson	Sweden	1.83	860
4	Ernest Sutherland	South Africa	1.80	818
4	Iivari Yrjölä	Finland	1.80	818
6	Aleksander Klumberg	Estonia	1.75	748
6	Denis Duigan	Australia	1.75	748
8	Antoni Cejzik	Poland	1.70	678
8	Antti Huusari	Finland	1.70	678
8	Enrique Thompson	Argentina	1.70	678
8	Ernst Gerspach	Switzerland	1.70	678
8	Gvido Jekals	Latvia	1.70	678
8	Josse Ruth	Belgium	1.70	678
8	Valter Ever	Estonia	1.70	678
8	Bill Shanahan	Ireland	1.70	678
16	Adolfo Contoli	Italy	1.65	608
16	Bertil Fastén	Sweden	1.65	608
16	Donald Slack	Great Britain	1.65	608
16	Eugen Uuemaa	Estonia	1.65	608
16	Gabriel Sempé	France	1.65	608
21	Constant Bucher	Switzerland	1.60	538
21	Elemér Somfay	Hungary	1.60	538
21	Elmar Rähn	Estonia	1.60	538
21	Harry Freida	United States	1.60	538
21	Harry de Keijser	Netherlands	1.60	538
21	Paavo Yrjölä	Finland	1.60	538
21	Stelios Benardis	Greece	1.60	538
21	Gaston Médécin	Monaco	1.60	538
21	Édouard Armand	Haiti	1.60	538
21	Ðuro Gašpar	Yugoslavia	1.60	538
31	Peroslav Ferković	Yugoslavia	1.50	398
31	Tokushige Noto	Japan	1.50	398
33	Percy Spark	Great Britain	1.40	258
–	Adolf Meier	Switzerland	No mark	0
–	Evert Nilsson	Sweden	No mark	0

=== 400 meters ===
This event was held 11 July 1924.

Rank	Athlete	Country	Time	Points
1	Tokushige Noto	Japan	51.4	879.68
2	Josse Ruth	Belgium	51.8	864.64
3	Denis Duigan	Australia	52.0	857.12
3	Enrique Thompson	Argentina	52.0	857.12
5	Emerson Norton	United States	53.0	819.52
5	Gaston Médécin	Monaco	53.0	819.52
5	Édouard Armand	Haiti	53.0	819.52
8	Harold Osborn	United States	53.2	812.00
9	Antti Huusari	Finland	53.4	804.48
9	Ernst Gerspach	Switzerland	53.4	804.48
11	Elmar Rähn	Estonia	53.6	796.96
12	Constant Bucher	Switzerland	54.0	781.92
12	Harry Frieda	United States	54.0	781.92
12	Iivari Yrjölä	Finland	54.0	781.92
15	Gvido Jekals	Latvia	54.2	774.40
15	Helge Jansson	Sweden	54.2	774.40
17	Aleksander Klumberg	Estonia	54.4	766.88
18	Bertil Fastén	Sweden	54.6	759.36
18	Harry de Keijser	Netherlands	54.6	759.36
18	Paavo Yrjölä	Finland	54.6	759.36
21	Peroslav Ferković	Yugoslavia	55.0	744.32
22	Adolf Meier	Switzerland	55.2	736.80
22	Donald Slack	Great Britain	55.2	736.80
24	Antoni Cejzik	Poland	55.4	729.28
24	Eugen Uuemaa	Estonia	55.4	729.28
24	Bill Shanahan	Ireland	55.4	729.28
27	Adolfo Contoli	Italy	55.8	714.24
27	Valter Ever	Estonia	55.8	714.24
29	Ernest Sutherland	South Africa	56.0	706.72
30	Gabriel Sempé	France	56.8	676.64
31	Stelios Benardis	Greece	57.6	646.56
32	Percy Spark	Great Britain	59.0	593.92
33	Ðuro Gašpar	Yugoslavia	1:02.2	473.60

=== 110 meter hurdles ===
This event was held 12 July 1924.

Rank	Athlete	Country	Time	Points
1	Harold Osborn	United States	16.0	905
2	Antti Huusari	Finland	16.6	848
2	Ernest Sutherland	South Africa	16.6	848
2	Emerson Norton	United States	16.6	848
5	Ernst Gerspach	Switzerland	16.8	829
5	Josse Ruth	Belgium	16.8	829
5	Bill Shanahan	Ireland	16.8	829
8	Adolf Meier	Switzerland	17.0	810
8	Eugen Uuemaa	Estonia	17.0	810
10	Gabriel Sempé	France	17.2	791
10	Tokushige Noto	Japan	17.2	791
12	Adolfo Contoli	Italy	17.4	772
13	Aleksander Klumberg	Estonia	17.6	753
13	Donald Slack	Great Britain	17.6	753
15	Antoni Cejzik	Poland	17.8	734
15	Enrique Thompson	Argentina	17.8	734
15	Gvido Jekals	Latvia	17.8	734
15	Helge Jansson	Sweden	17.8	734
19	Gaston Médécin	Monaco	18.0	715
20	Constant Bucher	Switzerland	18.4	677
20	Elmar Rähn	Estonia	18.4	677
22	Paavo Yrjölä	Finland	18.8	639
23	Harry Frieda	United States	19.0	620
23	Harry de Keijser	Netherlands	19.0	620
23	Édouard Armand	Haiti	19.0	620
26	Stelios Benardis	Greece	19.2	601
27	Peroslav Ferković	Yugoslavia	20.4	487
–	Percy Spark	Great Britain	DQ	0
–	Denis Duigan	Australia	DQ	0
–	Iivari Yrjölä	Finland	DQ	0
–	Bertil Fastén	Sweden	DQ	0

=== Discus throw ===
This event was held 12 July 1924.

Rank	Athlete	Country	Distance (m)	Points
1	Harry de Keijser	Netherlands	38.41	741.60
2	Paavo Yrjölä	Finland	38.14	731.34
3	Antoni Cejzik	Poland	37.385	702.65
4	Aleksander Klumberg	Estonia	36.795	680.23
5	Harry Frieda	United States	35.095	615.63
6	Constant Bucher	Switzerland	34.78	603.66
7	Harold Osborn	United States	34.51	593.40
8	Ernst Gerspach	Switzerland	33.91	570.60
9	Antti Huusari	Finland	33.15	541.72
10	Emerson Norton	United States	33.11	540.20
11	Percy Spark	Great Britain	33.085	539.25
12	Adolfo Contoli	Italy	32.92	532.98
13	Gvido Jekals	Latvia	32.25	507.52
14	Helge Jansson	Sweden	32.08	501.06
15	Gabriel Sempé	France	32.04	499.54
16	Enrique Thompson	Argentina	30.895	456.03
17	Ernest Sutherland	South Africa	30.83	453.56
18	Stelios Benardis	Greece	30.56	443.30
19	Eugen Uuemaa	Estonia	28.46	363.50
20	Gaston Médécin	Monaco	27.65	332.72
21	Peroslav Ferković	Yugoslavia	25.895	266.03
22	Bill Shanahan	Ireland	25.06	234.30
23	Donald Slack	Great Britain	24.32	206.18
24	Josse Ruth	Belgium	23.87	189.08
25	Tokushige Noto	Japan	23.61	179.20
26	Édouard Armand	Haiti	21.885	113.65
27	Elmar Rähn	Estonia	No mark	0

=== Pole vault ===
This event was held 12 July 1924.

Rank	Athlete	Country	Height	Points
1	Emerson Norton	United States	3.80	919.0
2	Harold Osborn	United States	3.50	757.0
2	Harry de Keijser	Netherlands	3.50	757.0
4	Ernst Gerspach	Switzerland	3.40	703.0
4	Harry Frieda	United States	3.40	703.0
6	Aleksander Klumberg	Estonia	3.30	649.0
6	Peroslav Ferković	Yugoslavia	3.30	649.0
6	Ernest Sutherland	South Africa	3.30	649.0
6	Eugen Uuemaa	Estonia	3.30	649.0
10	Antti Huusari	Finland	3.20	595.0
10	Josse Ruth	Belgium	3.20	595.0
10	Édouard Armand	Haiti	3.20	595.0
13	Adolfo Contoli	Italy	3.10	541.0
13	Helge Jansson	Sweden	3.10	541.0
15	Stelios Benardis	Greece	2.92	443.8
16	Antoni Cejzik	Poland	2.90	433.0
16	Constant Bucher	Switzerland	2.90	433.0
18	Bill Shanahan	Ireland	2.82	389.8
19	Elmar Rähn	Estonia	2.80	379.0
19	Gabriel Sempé	France	2.80	379.0
21	Enrique Thompson	Argentina	2.73	341.2
21	Paavo Yrjölä	Finland	2.73	341.2
23	Donald Slack	Great Britain	2.60	271.0
24	Gvido Jekals	Latvia	2.53	233.2
25	Tokushige Noto	Japan	2.30	109.0
–	Gaston Médécin	Monaco	No height	0

=== Javelin throw ===
This event was held 12 July 1924.

Rank	Athlete	Country	Distance (m)	Points
1	Aleksander Klumberg	Estonia	57.70	909.250
2	Harry Frieda	United States	54.90	832.250
3	Antti Huusari	Finland	53.65	787.875
4	Paavo Yrjölä	Finland	52.93	778.075
5	Ernest Sutherland	South Africa	51.015	725.4125
6	Helge Jansson	Sweden	47.20	620.500
7	Adolfo Contoli	Italy	46.935	613.2125
8	Harold Osborn	United States	46.69	606.475
9	Antoni Cejzik	Poland	46.23	593.825
10	Ernst Gerspach	Switzerland	44.82	555.050
11	Harry de Keijser	Netherlands	44.66	550.650
12	Enrique Thompson	Argentina	43.37	515.175
13	Gvido Jekals	Latvia	43.02	505.550
14	Emerson Norton	United States	42.09	479.975
15	Eugen Uuemaa	Estonia	40.69	441.475
16	Stelios Benardis	Greece	40.64	440.100
17	Constant Bucher	Switzerland	39.415	406.4125
18	Bill Shanahan	Ireland	39.00	395.000
19	Elmar Rähn	Estonia	38.38	377.950
20	Peroslav Ferković	Yugoslavia	36.59	328.725
21	Donald Slack	Great Britain	36.11	315.525
22	Tokushige Noto	Japan	35.22	291.050
23	Josse Ruth	Belgium	32.28	210.200
24	Gaston Médécin	Monaco	30.68	166.200
25	Édouard Armand	Haiti	11.64	0.000

=== 1500 meters ===
This event was held 12 July 1924.

Rank	Athlete	Country	Time	Points
1	Enrique Thompson	Argentina	4:32.4	786.4
2	Josse Ruth	Belgium	4:36.4	762.4
3	Peroslav Ferković	Yugoslavia	4:37.0	758.8
4	Antti Huusari	Finland	4:37.2	757.6
5	Édouard Armand	Haiti	4:42.4	726.4
6	Elmar Rähn	Estonia	4:44.0	716.8
7	Tokushige Noto	Japan	4:45.8	706.0
8	Gaston Médécin	Monaco	4:49.6	683.2
9	Harold Osborn	United States	4:50.0	680.8
10	Adolfo Contoli	Italy	4:56.0	644.8
11	Constant Bucher	Sweden	4:57.2	637.6
12	Harry Frieda	United States	5:02.6	605.2
13	Ernst Gerspach	Switzerland	5:08.2	571.6
14	Paavo Yrjölä	Finland	5:08.6	569.2
15	Antoni Cejzik	Poland	5:11.6	551.2
16	Donald Slack	Great Britain	5:11.8	550.0
17	Harry de Keijser	Netherlands	5:15.4	528.4
18	Aleksander Klumberg	Estonia	5:16.0	524.8
19	Gvido Jekals	Latvia	5:19.0	506.8
19	Ernest Sutherland	South Africa	5:19.0	506.8
21	Helge Jansson	Sweden	5:22.0	488.8
22	Stelios Benardis	Greece	5:25.6	467.2
23	Eugen Uuemaa	Estonia	5:32.4	426.4
24	Emerson Norton	United States	5:38.0	392.8
25	Bill Shanahan	Ireland	5:41.4	372.4

== Final standings ==
Rank	Athlete	Total
1st place, gold medalist(s)	Harold Osborn (USA)	7710.775
2nd place, silver medalist(s)	Emerson Norton (USA)	7350.895
3rd place, bronze medalist(s)	Aleksander Klumberg (EST)	7329.360
4	Antti Huusari (FIN)	7005.175
5	Ernest Sutherland (RSA)	6794.1425
6	Ernst Gerspach (SUI)	6743.530
7	Helge Jansson (SWE)	6656.160
8	Harry Frieda (USA)	6618.300
9	Paavo Yrjölä (FIN)	6548.525
10	Harry de Keijser (NED)	6509.610
11	Adolfo Contoli (ITA)	6406.8825
12	Antoni Cejzik (POL)	6319.455
13	Enrique Thompson (ARG)	6310.525
14	Gvido Jekals (LAT)	5981.670
15	Constant Bucher (SUI)	5961.5925
16	Eugen Uemaa (EST)	5899.105
17	Joseph Ruth (BEL)	5866.670
18	Peroslav Ferković (YUG)	5517.925
19	William Shanahan (IRL)	5426.680
20	Gaston Médecin (MON)	5347.540
21	Elmar Rähn (EST)	5292.760
22	Tokushige Noto (JPN)	5248.330
23	Édouard Armand (HAI)	5207.895
24	Stelios Benardis (GRE)	5189.160
25	Donald Slack (GBR)	5148.105
–	Otto Anderson (USA)	DNF
–	Dennis Duigan (AUS)	DNF
–	Valter Ever (EST)	DNF
–	Bertil Fastén (SWE)	DNF
–	Đuro Gašpar (YUG)	DNF
–	Adolf Meier (SUI)	DNF
–	Evert Nilsson (SWE)	DNF
–	Gabriel Sempé (FRA)	DNF
–	Elemér Somfay (HUN)	DNF
–	Arthur Spark (GBR)	DNF
–	Iivari Yrjölä (FIN)	DNF
