= 1923 International Universities Championships =

Multi-sport event in Paris, France

I International Universities Championships
- Slogan
- Nations: 12
- Events: 2 sports
- Opening: May 3, 1923
- Closing: May 6, 1923
- Opened by: Alexandre Millerand
- Main venue: Stade de Colombes

The 1923 International Universities Championships was organised by the Union Nationale des Étudiants de France (UNEF) and held in Paris, France. Taking place from 3–6 May, ten nations were present in the men's only programme, which included athletics (18 events) and fencing (4 events).

== Background ==
The first modern athletics clubs in the world were founded at Cambridge University in 1857, and Oxford University in 1860. Those universities held Inter-'Varsity Sports, also called The Cambridge and Oxford Athletic Games, from 1864 onwards. Other varsity matches developed between Cambridge and Oxford universities and spread to Harvard University and Yale University in the United States.

English peace campaigner Hodgson Pratt was an early advocate of a global international sports competition between student athletes. He proposed the motion which was passed at the 1891 Universal Peace Congress in Rome to create a series of international student conferences in rotating host capital cities, with activities including art and sport. This did not come to fruition, but a national multi-sport event for university students was created in Germany in 1909 in the form of the Academic Olympia. Five editions were held from 1909 to 1913, all of which were hosted in Germany following the cancellation of an Italy-based event. By 1918, students' union presidents in the United Kingdom expressed the need to have an association to promote sport at universities across the country. The Inter-Varsity Athletics Board of England and Wales (IVAB) was established in 1919 and organised the first inter-varsity track and field meeting that year at Manchester University. In the United States, the National Collegiate Athletic Association (NCAA), at the time a discussion group and rules-making body, organised its first National Collegiate Track and Field Championships in 1921.

== Organisation and events ==
At the start of the 20th century, Jean Petitjean of France began attempting to organise a "University Olympic Games". After discussion with Pierre de Coubertin, the founder of the modern Olympic Games, Petitjean was convinced not to use the word "Olympic" in the tournament's name. Petitjean's efforts led to the 1923 International Universities Championships.

The championships was organised by the Union Nationale des Étudiants de France (UNEF). Held in Paris, France from 3–6 May, ten nations were present in the men's only programme, which included athletics (18 events) and fencing (4 events).

== Athletics medal summary ==
Event	Gold		Silver		Bronze	
100 metres	Charles Paddock (USA)	10.4	Bohus Fleischer (TCH)	11.4e	Fournier (FRA)	Not known
200 metres	Charles Paddock (USA)	21.0	Bohus Fleischer (TCH)	22.4e	Carlo Mereu (ITA)	Not known
400 metres	Adriaan Paulen (NED)	51.2	Wilbeaux (BEL)	Not known	Gossé (FRA)	Not known
800 metres	Paul Martin (SUI)	1:57.0	Adriaan Paulen (NED)	1:57.2e	Pierre Villeneuve (FRA)	2:00.5e
1500 metres	Suby (FRA)	4:20.8	René Chatelain (FRA)	Not known	Francis Bordes (FRA)	Not known
5000 metres	R.A.S. Castell (ENG)	16:28.0	Pippo Orio (ITA)	16:28.8e	Binder (FRA)	Not known
110 m hurdles	Otto van Rappart (NED)	16.0	Gabriel Sempé (FRA)	16.1e	Adolfo Contoli (ITA)	Not known
400 m hurdles	René Resal (FRA)	59.4	Vigoni (BEL)	Not known	Maurice Frichoux (FRA)	Not known
4 × 100 m relay	Netherlands; Harry van Rappard; Oscar van Rappard; Wim Venlet; Chris Bovens	44.8	Italy	44.8	Belgium; Émile Vercken; Fred Zinner; Roels; Wilbeaux	45.0e
4 × 400 m relay	France; Gossé; Pierre Villeneuve; Le Floch; René Resal	3:32.0	Belgium	3:32.0	Italy	Not known
1000 m medley relay	Netherlands; Adriaan Paulen; Harry van Rappard; Wim Venlet; Chris Bovens	2:05.2	Italy	2:05.2	Belgium	Not known
High jump	Louis Zwahlen (FRA)	1.79	Gabriel Sempé (FRA); Ettore Uicich (ITA)	1.75	Not awarded	
Pole vault	Henry Petersen (DEN)	3.70	Adolfo Contoli (ITA); Jan Milde (TCH)	3.40	Not awarded	
Long jump	Gabriel Sempé (FRA)	7.06	Georges Krotoff (FRA)	6.59	Alois Sobotka (TCH)	6.54
Shot put	Jan Milde (TCH)	12.84	Dušan Ivkovic (TCH)	12.22	Édouard Duhour (FRA)	11.73
Discus throw	Jan Milde (TCH)	35.92	Antonín Svoboda (TCH)	35.88	Gabriel Sempé (FRA)	33.46
Javelin throw	Carlo Clemente (ITA)	53.80	Marco Manuel Gismondi (ITA)	47.84	Václav Chmelík (TCH)	47.26
Pentathlon	Adolfo Contoli (ITA)	09.00	Antonín Svoboda (TCH)	12.00	Fred Zinner (BEL)	14.00

== Medal table ==
Rank	Nation	Gold	Silver	Bronze	Total
1	France (FRA)	5	4	8	17
2	Italy (ITA)	2	5	4	11
3	Czechoslovakia (TCH)	2	5	2	9
4	Netherlands (NED)	2	1	0	3
5	United States (USA)	2	0	0	2
6	Denmark (DEN)	1	0	0	1
6	England (ENG)	1	0	0	1
6	Switzerland (SUI)	1	0	0	1
9	Belgium (BEL)	0	3	3	6
Totals (9 entries)		16	18	17	51

== Participating nations ==
- Belgium
- Czechoslovakia
- Denmark
- Estonia
- France
- Italy
- Great Britain
- Netherlands
- Lithuania
- Poland
- Switzerland
- United States

== See also ==
- FISU World University Games § Precursors
- University and college sport
