= Athletics at the 1924 Summer Olympics – Men's long jump =

Men's long jump at the Games of the VIII Olympiad
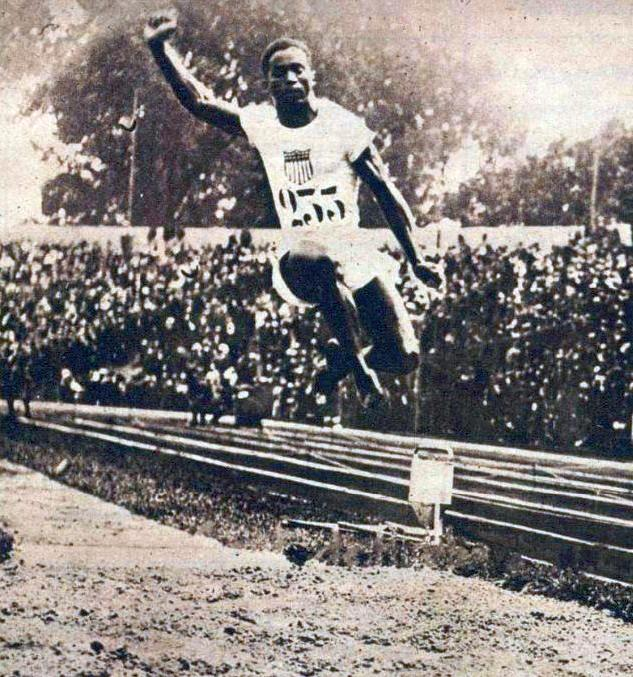
- DeHart Hubbard
- Venue: Stade Olympique Yves-du-Manoir
- Date: July 8, 1924
- Competitors: 34 from 21 nations
- Winning distance: 7.445

Medalists
1st place, gold medalist(s)		DeHart Hubbard; United States
2nd place, silver medalist(s)		Edward Gourdin; United States
3rd place, bronze medalist(s)		Sverre Hansen; Norway

The men's long jump event was part of the track and field athletics programme at the 1924 Summer Olympics. The competition was held on Tuesday, July 8, 1924. 34 long jumpers from 21 nations competed. The maximum number of athletes per nation was 4. The event was won by DeHart Hubbard of the United States, the nation's sixth title in the event (having not won only at the 1920 Games). Sverre Hansen won Norway's first long jump medal with the bronze.

== Background ==
This was the seventh appearance of the event, which is one of 12 athletics events to have been held at every Summer Olympics. The only returning finalist from the 1920 Games was fifth-place finisher Erling Aastad of Norway. The favorite was DeHart Hubbard of the United States, the 1922–1924 AAU champion and winner of the U.S. Olympic trials.

Bulgaria, Ecuador, Estonia, Haiti, India, Japan, Mexico, and Poland each made their first appearance in the event. The United States appeared for the seventh time, the only nation to have long jumpers at each of the Games thus far.

== Competition format ==
The 1924 format continued to use the two-round format used in 1900 and since 1908, with the six-man finals introduced in 1920 (though a tie for sixth led to seven jumpers advancing this time). Each jumper had three jumps in the qualifying round; finalists received an additional three jumps, with qualifying round jumps still counting if the final jumps were not better.

== Records ==
These were the standing world and Olympic records (in metres) prior to this competition. Robert LeGendre, who did not compete in this event, set a new world record in the pentathlon contest one day earlier.

World record	Robert LeGendre (USA)	7.765	Paris, France	7 July 1924
Olympic record	Robert LeGendre (USA)	7.765	Paris, France	7 July 1924

== Schedule ==
Date	Time	Round
Tuesday, 8 July 1924	14:00	Qualifying; Final

== Results ==
The best six long jumpers, all four groups counted together, qualified for the final. In this case seven competitors were allowed to participate in the final, because two jumpers tied in sixth place in the qualification. The jumping order and the jumping series are not available.

Rank	Athlete	Nation	Qualifying		Final	Best mark
Rank	Athlete	Nation	Distance	Rank	Final	Best mark
1st place, gold medalist(s)	DeHart Hubbard	United States	7.120	3	7.445	7.445
2nd place, silver medalist(s)	Edward Gourdin	United States	7.190	2	7.275	7.275
3rd place, bronze medalist(s)	Sverre Hansen	Norway	7.260	1	Unknown	7.260
4	Vilho Tuulos	Finland	7.070	4	Unknown	7.070
5	Louis Wilhelme	France	6.990	5	Unknown	6.990
6	Christopher MacKintosh	Great Britain	6.880	6	6.92	6.920
7	Virgilio Tommasi	Italy	6.880	6	6.89	6.890
8	Jaap Boot	Netherlands	6.860	8	Did not advance	6.860
9	Albert Rose	United States	6.855	9	Did not advance	6.855
10	Mikio Oda	Japan	6.830	10	Did not advance	6.830
10	Pauli Sandström	Finland	6.830	10	Did not advance	6.830
12	Silvio Cator	Haiti	6.810	12	Did not advance	6.810
13	Erling Aastad	Norway	6.720	13	Did not advance	6.720
14	Richard Honner	Australia	6.635	14	Did not advance	6.635
14	Dalip Singh	India	6.635	14	Did not advance	6.635
16	Marcel Guillouet	France	6.620	16	Did not advance	6.620
17	Adolf Meier	Switzerland	6.610	17	Did not advance	6.610
18	Alois Sobotka	Czechoslovakia	6.590	18	Did not advance	6.590
19	Valter Ever	Estonia	6.585	19	Did not advance	6.585
20	Louis-Henri Albinet	France	6.550	20	Did not advance	6.550
21	Väinö Rainio	Finland	6.540	21	Did not advance	6.540
22	Gaston Médécin	Monaco	6.510	22	Did not advance	6.510
23	Paul Hammer	Luxembourg	6.240	23	Did not advance	6.240
24	Paul Couillaud	France	6.220	24	Did not advance	6.220
25	Josef Macháň	Czechoslovakia	6.090	25	Did not advance	6.090
26	Kiril Petrunov	Bulgaria	6.000	26	Did not advance	6.000
27	Konstantinos Pantelidis	Greece	5.940	27	Did not advance	5.940
28	Francisco Contreras	Mexico	5.735	28	Did not advance	5.735
29	Jos Hilger	Luxembourg	5.680	29	Did not advance	5.680
29	Alberto Jurado	Ecuador	5.680	29	Did not advance	5.680
31	Stanisław Sośnicki	Poland	5.670	31	Did not advance	5.670
32	Alfonso Stoopen	Mexico	5.480	32	Did not advance	5.480
33	William Comins	United States	—	33	Did not advance	No mark
33	Hannes de Boer	Netherlands	—	33	Did not advance	No mark

== Sources ==
- Official Report
- Wudarski, Pawel (1999). "Wyniki Igrzysk Olimpijskich" (in Polish).
