= Athletic Federation of Yugoslavia =

- Sport: Athletics
- Abbreviation: ASJ
- Founded: 11 September 1921
- Affiliation: IAAF
- Affiliation date: 1922
- Regional affiliation: EAA
- Headquarters: Zagreb (1921–1941); Belgrade (1948–2003)

The Athletic Federation of Yugoslavia (Serbo croatian Atletski Savez Jugoslavije) was the governing body for the sport of athletics in Yugoslavia. It was founded in Zagreb as Yugoslav Light Athletics Federation (JLAS - Jugoslavenski lakoatletski savez).

== History ==
=== Interwar period (1922–1941) ===
The organization was originally established on 11 September 1921 in Zagreb, as Jugoslavenski atletski savez or JAS for short (French: Fédération yougoslave d'athlétisme), and its first president was Veljko Ugrinić as the umbrella organization for the sport of athletics in the Kingdom of Yugoslavia (officially styled "Kingdom of Serbs, Croats and Slovenes" from 1918 to 1929).

The federation initially had 19 members, which were either athletics clubs or athletics sections of multi-sports clubs based in Ljubljana, Zagreb, Zrenjanin, Belgrade, Samobor and Bukovac. At the time, the association governed both "light athletics" (track and field) and "heavy athletics" (boxing, wrestling) sports.

In 1923 heavy athletics was spun off into a separate federation, and the organization was renamed Yugoslav Light Athletics Federation (Jugoslavenski lakoatletski savez) or JLAS. That same year, four regional sub-associations were established in major urban areas (Zagreb, Belgrade, Ljubljana, Vojvodina) and a fifth was added in the early 1930s, in Split.

In 1938 the name was reverted to JAS, and briefly between mid-1939 until the collapse of the country in 1941 it was called Atletski savez Kraljevine Jugoslavije (ASKJ).

Immediately after foundation in 1922 the federation was recognized by the International Amateur Athletic Federation (IAAF) which allowed it to send Yugoslav athletes to international competitions. The first Yugoslav Olympians in athletics were Peroslav Ferković, Đuro Gašpar, Veljko Narančić, Stanko Perpar, and Aleksa Spahić, who competed at the 1924 Summer Olympics in Paris in the decathlon, pentathlon, shot put, discus throw, and 200 metres events.

Yugoslav athletes continued to compete at the 1928 Summer Olympics in Amsterdam, the 1932 Summer Olympics in Los Angeles, and the 1936 Summer Olympics in Berlin. In their last Olympic appearance before the war, Yugoslavia sent 21 track and field athletes to Berlin (16 men and five women). The best result among women was by Jelica Stanojević from the Belgrade club SK Jugoslavija—also the first female Olympian for Yugoslavia—who came in 12th in women's javelin throw. The best result among men was Aleksa Kovačević of HAŠK Concordia, who came in 11th in shot put.

In 1929 the Yugoslav Athletics Federation was also one of the founding members of Balkan Games, an annual regional athletics event for Balkan countries. The event was held in Athens every year between 1929 and 1933, and in 1934 Zagreb hosted the first edition held outside of Greece. In 1938 another edition was hosted in Belgrade.

The federation also maintained official Yugoslav records since its inception. The first men's official records were dated from 1919 and the first national competitions, which predated the establishment of the federation. The first women's records were from 1923. Throughout the 1920s and 1930s JAS organized national individual championships for men and women, and in 1930 team and cross championships were also added.

The seat of the organization remained in Zagreb during this entire period. Following the outbreak of World War II and the April 1941 invasion of Yugoslavia the newly installed authorities of the Nazi-allied NDH regime in Zagreb shut down the organization.

=== Post-war period (1945–1991) ===
Immediately after World War II the new communist authorities of SFR Yugoslavia reorganized sports, and formed a central government body to regulate and organize fiskultura ("physical education") and sports facilities for mass sport, known as FISAJ. In 1945 a committee for athletics was formed with FISAJ, and across Yugoslavia multi-sports societies were founded, with sections for athletics.

In August 1947 the Yugoslav Olympic Committee was re-established in Belgrade, tasked with coordinating the Olympic team for the first post-war Olympics in 1948. Around that time it was also decided to replace a single centralized body with national sports federations, so on 4 July 1948 the new ASJ (Atletski savez Jugoslavije) was re-established, headquartered in Belgrade.

In the late 1940s and early 1950s athletics becomes one of the main sports promoted by the government, with mass games and cross country running becoming the most popular events. In 1948 national under-20s championship is introduced, lowered to under-18s by 1950.

During this period, ASJ was subdivided into regional organizations, operating in each of the six Yugoslav republics (SR Bosnia and Herzegovina, SR Croatia, SR Macedonia, SR Montenegro, SR Serbia, SR Slovenia) and two autonomous provinces (SAP Kosovo and SAP Vojvodina). Separate branches for coaches and referees were also established.

== Affiliations ==
- International Association of Athletics Federations (IAAF)
- European Athletic Association (EAA)
- Association of the Balkan Athletics Federations
- Yugoslav Olympic Committee

== Events hosted ==
- 1934 Balkan Games in Zagreb
- 1938 Balkan Games in Belgrade
- 1954 Balkan Athletics Championships in Belgrade
- 1956 Balkan Athletics Championships in Belgrade
- 1961 Balkan Athletics Championships in Belgrade
- 1962 European Athletics Championships in Belgrade
- 1966 Balkan Athletics Championships in Sarajevo
- 1971 Balkan Athletics Championships in Zagreb
- 1976 Balkan Athletics Championships in Celje
- 1981 Balkan Athletics Championships in Sarajevo
- 1986 Balkan Athletics Championships in Ljubljana
- 1990 European Athletics Championships in Split

== Administrators ==
=== Presidents ===
- 1921–1938: Veljko Ugrinić
- 1938–1940: Josip Gruden
- 1948–1950: Branko Drašković
- 1950–1952: Gen. Dušan Korać
- 1952–1963: Vlado Ivković
- 1964–1972: Hakija Pozderac
- 1972: Džemal Muminagić
- 1972–1978: Gen. Miloš Šumonja
- 1978–1981: Bojan Polak
- 1981–1982: Milan Vranić
- 1982–1983: Dragan Nikitović
- 1983–1984: Strate Arsovski
- 1984–1985: Gjëmshit Duriqi
- 1985–1991: Mehmed Sokolović
- 1992–1994: Dragoslav Jovanović
- 1994–2000: Svetozar Krstić

=== Secretaries general ===
- 1922–1941: Đuro Graf, Nikola Inkey, Alko Kohn, Josip Wachs, Zdravko Frančić, Slavko Marian, Zdravko Muhvić
- 1948–2000: Slavoljub Đukić, Artur Takač, Petar Vuković, Vlado Marjanović, Milorad Josipović, Ivica Matijević, Ivica Možek
