= Yugoslavian Athletics Championships =

Annual track and field competition

- Sport: Track and field
- Founded: 1920
- Country: Yugoslavia

The Yugoslavian Athletics Championships was an annual outdoor track and field competition organised by the Athletic Federation of Yugoslavia, which served as the national championship for the sport in Yugoslavia.

The event was first held in 1920, two years after the foundation of the Kingdom of Yugoslavia, and events for women were added to the schedule in 1923. The championships continued with the post-war Socialist Federal Republic of Yugoslavia state. Participation diminished as various regions broke away from the country and set up their own national championships. From 1992 onwards, only Serbian and Montenegrin athletes took part. The Yugoslavian Championships ceased in 2003 with the renaming of the remnant constituents of Yugoslavia as Serbia and Montenegro that year. Separate annual championship events were held for cross country running, road running and racewalking events. There was also a Yugoslavian Indoor Athletics Championships.

== Events ==
The competition programme featured a total of 37 individual Yugoslavian Championship athletics events, 19 for men and 18 for women. For each of the sexes, there are seven track running events, two obstacle events, four jumps, four throws, and one combined track and field event. Men also competed in the steeplechase, which did not become a standard event for women until after the breakup of Yugoslavia.

Track running

- 100 metres, 200 metres, 400 metres, 800 metres, 1500 metres, 5000 metres, 10,000 metres

Obstacle events

- 100 metres hurdles (women only), 110 metres hurdles (men only), 400 metres hurdles, 3000 metres steeplechase (men only)

Jumping events

- Pole vault, high jump, long jump, triple jump

Throwing events

- Shot put, discus throw, javelin throw, hammer throw

Combined events

- Decathlon (men only), Heptathlon (women only)

A men's 10,000 metres race walk was held at the competition for the first time in 1989.

The women's programme gradually expanded to match the men's. On the track, the 1500 m was added in 1969, the 3000 metres in 1972 and the 10,000 metres in 1988. A 5000 m was added in 1996 and the 3000 m event ceased after 1998, effectively having been replaced. Similarly, the women's pentathlon was replaced by the heptathlon in 1981. The 80 metres hurdles was contested until 1969, after which the international standard distance of 100 m hurdles was used. A 400 m hurdles event was introduced in 1976. The women's field events reached parity with the men's after the addition of triple jump in 1990, and hammer throw and pole vault in 1996. Racewalking for women over 5000 m was introduced in 1994.
