= Association générale des étudiants français en Afrique noire =

Dakaran student organization

Association générale des étudiants français en Afrique noire (French for 'General Association of French Students in Black Africa', abbreviated AGEFAN) was a student organization in Dakar. AGEFAN was set up in 1956, as French students pulled out of the General Students Association of Dakar (AGED), as AGED transformed itself into the General Students Union of West Africa (UGEAO). In particular, the French students reacted negatively to the fact that UGEAO used the name 'West Africa' rather than 'French West Africa'. AGEFAN affiliated itself to the National Union of Students of France (UNEF), a body that AGED had refused to member an affiliate of. In general, AGEFAN kept a low profile at the Dakar campus.

AGEFAN published the bulletin AGE-Presse.
