= Osvaldo Licini =

Italian painter

Osvaldo Licini (22 March 1894 – 11 October 1958) was an Italian painter, active as an abstract artist.

== Biography ==
Licini was born in Monte Vidon Corrado in the Marche, Italy, on March 22, 1894. His father was Vincenzo Licini, a lithographer, and his mother was Amedea Corazza, a local hatmaker originally from Bologna. Licini's parents emigrated to Paris, France, not long after his birth, and in 1896 Corazza birthed Esmeralda Licini, Osvaldo's sister. While Licini's parents raised Esmeralda in Paris, the young Licini was left in his hometown under the care of his grandparents. He held artistic ambitions from a young age and decided to attend the Accademia di Belle Arti di Bologna at the age of 14, where one of his fellow students was Giorgio Morandi. There Licini engaged with many different art styles, including Futurism, although he didn't strictly adhere to any. At the age of 19 Licini joined the Italian army and fought in World War I, and was injured at the battle of Podgora.While recovering from his injury in a military hospital in Florence, Licini met a young Swiss woman by the name of Beatrice Mueller, with whom he had a son, who they named Paolo. In 1917, after a falling out with Mueller, Licini decided to travel to Paris to see his mother and sister (his father had died years previously). At Paris, Licini frequently visited the Café de la Rotonde, where he met Pablo Picasso, and Leopold Zborowski, an art merchant who later sponsored much of Licini's art. During his time at Paris, Licini also met Amedeo Modigliani, who became his friend. In the late 1920s Licini married the Swedish artist Nancy Hellstroem. Licini became an abstract artist around 1930 after his encounter with the Parisian Circle et Carré and Abstraction-Création groups. He was elected Mayor of Monte Vidon Corrado in 1946 and the town opened the Center for Osvaldo Licini Studies (Centro Studi Osvaldo Licini) in 1986, which, from 2013 onwards, has included the Osvaldo Licini House Museum, where Licini's house and most important works are displayed

== Art ==
Licini's art is considered abstract.
