= Sverre Hansen =

Sverre Hansen may refer to:

- Sverre Hansen (athlete) (1899–1991), Norwegian long jumper
- Sverre Hansen (footballer) (1913–1974), Norwegian footballer
- Sverre Hansen (actor) (1919–1995), Norwegian actor
