= Erling Aastad =

Norwegian track and field athlete

Erling Rudolf Aastad (2 March 1898 – 30 June 1963) was a Norwegian long jumper and sprinter.

He was born in Kristiania. At the 1920 Summer Olympics he finished fifth in the long jump final with a jump of 6.885 metres. He also competed for the 4 × 100 m relay team which was disqualified in the first round of the relay event. At the 1924 Summer Olympics he finished thirteenth in the long jump with 6.72 metres, and at the 1928 Summer Olympics he finished fourteenth with 7.07 metres.

He became Norwegian champion in long jump in 1920 and 1925–1930, won a silver medal in 1921 and bronze medals in 1918 and 1924. He represented the clubs Fagforeningernes TIF and Torodd IF. He also won a silver medal in the 100 metres in 1925, behind Bjarne Guldager and ahead of Charles Hoff. Here he achieved 10.9 seconds, which was his lifetime best. His personal best long jump was 7.45 metres, achieved in August 1925 on Bislett stadion.

7.45 metres was the Norwegian record until 1934, when it was broken by Otto Berg. Aastad had previously held a record with 7.22 metres between September 1921 and August 1922. It was broken by Sverre Hansen. Aastad also held the national record in the 4 × 100 metres relay from 1920 to 1935, and in Swedish relay from 1925 to 1926. He participated in six international matches.

After the war, he worked as manager and accountant in the Norwegian Athletics Association from 1945 to 1949. From 1951 to 1952 he was a member of the elite sports committee. He was later employed in Norsk Jungnerakkumulatorfabrikk.
