= Adriaan Paulen =

Dutch athlete and president of the IAAF

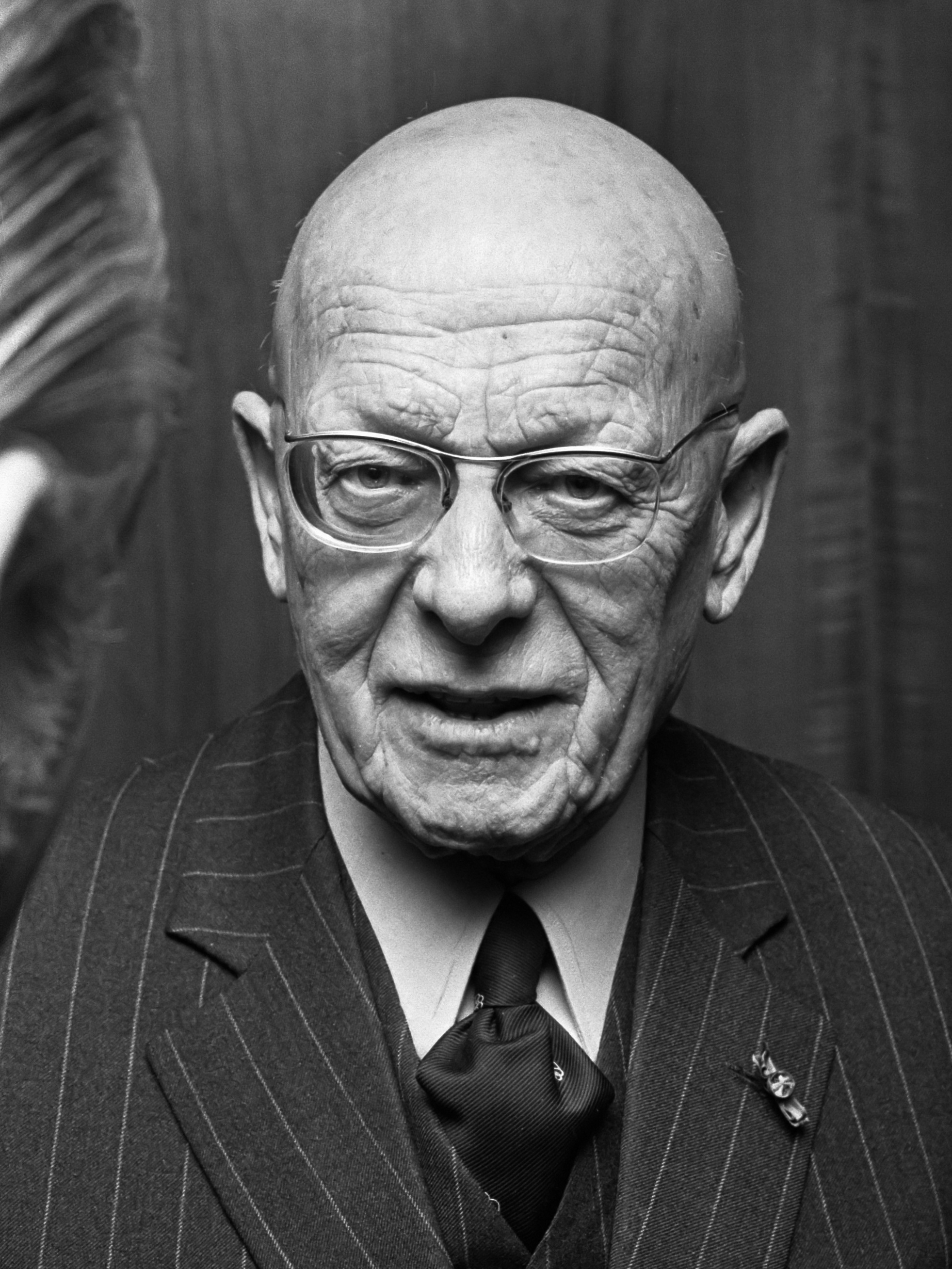
- Paulen in 1976

Medal record

Men's athletics

Representing the Netherlands

World Student Games
Gold medal – first place	1923 Paris	400 metres
Silver medal – second place	1923 Paris	800 metres

Adriaan "Adje" Paulen RMWO (Dutch: [ˈaːdrijaːn ˈɑtɕə ˈpʌulən]; 12 October 1902 – 9 May 1985) was a Dutch athlete who competed from 1917 to 1931. During World War II, he was part of the Dutch resistance in the Netherlands. Following World War II, Paulen became a sports official, becoming president of the IAAF (then International Amateur Athletic Federation), serving from 1976 to 1981.

== Sporting career ==
Competing in three Summer Olympics, Paulen earned his best finish of seventh in the 800 m event at Antwerp in 1920. In 1924, he became first of over forty world record breakers (up to his 1985 death) in athletics at Bislett stadion in Oslo, setting a record in 500 m, then an official distance. Besides competing at the 1928 Summer Olympics in Amsterdam, Paulen was also a member of the Organizing Committee.

Stepping down from his athletic career in 1931, Paulen also participated in the Monte Carlo Rally eight times and once competed in the Dutch TT MotoGP event. In his youth, Paulen competed in football at an international level.

== World War II ==
When Nazi Germany invaded the Netherlands in May 1940, Paulen joined the Nederlandsche Unie, an organisation that strived for co-operation with the German occupier. In August 1940 Paulen participated in fusion talks between the Nederlandse Unie and the fascistic Nationaal Front, which original name was Zwart Front (Black Front). Other participants for the Nederlandse Unie during these talks were Jan de Quay, after the war minister-president, Louis Einthoven, former head of the Rotterdam police and afterwar director of the BVD (secret service) and Hans Linthorst Homan, commissioner of the Queen in the province Groningen. For the Nationaal Front the infamous fascist Leader Arnold Meijer was head of a four men delegation. During these talks Jan de Quay, head of the delegation of the Nederlandse Unie, called himself a fascist, the Nederlandse Unie a fascistic organisation and said that he opposed democracy. The fusion talks failed.

Later during the war, Paulen was engineer at a coal mining industry, the Dutch State Mines. Workers started a strike and Paulen refused to give the Germans a list of strikers and was convicted to death, however Paulen was released soon. In 1944 Paulen crossed the front and joined the allied troops. Paulen met some of the British Army forces during Operation Market Garden in September 1944. Paulen kept a diary regarding Operation Market Garden and its aftermath that was released to the public in 1989, four years after his 1985 death, including meeting with United States Army officials during that time and would eventually be made a Colonel in the US Army.

=== Medal of Freedom and Knighthood ===
On 7 January 1946, by general order number 8, Paulen was awarded the US Medal of Freedom with bronze palm. On 12 September 1947, by Royal Decree, Paulen was knighted by Queen Wilhelmina of the Netherlands, receiving the fourth class (Knight) of the Military William Order. The Order is the highest and oldest military honour of the Kingdom of the Netherlands, bestowed for "performing excellent acts of Bravery, Leadership and Loyalty in battle". The award is comparable to the British Victoria Cross and seldom awarded.

== Sporting official ==
Following the end of World War II, Paulen played a key role in rebuilding the IAAF in 1946. He also served as president from the Dutch Athletic Committee (KNAU) from 1946 to 1964. In 1965, Paulen served as director of the Dutch Olympic Committee, a position he held until 1970. While working for the KNAU and Dutch Olympic Committee, he also served as an official for the IAAF. Paulen's most infamous role as an IAAF official was at the 1972 Summer Olympics in Munich. Controversy arose in the pole vault, when the new Cata-Pole, used by defending champion American Bob Seagren and Sweden's Kjell Isaksson, was declared to be illegal, by the IAAF, on 25 July. The pole was banned based on the fact that the pole contained carbon fibers; after an East German-led protest revealed that it contained no carbon fibers, the ban was lifted on 27 August. Three days later the IAAF reversed itself again, reinstating the ban. The poles were then confiscated from the athletes. Seagren and Isaksson believed this gave other athletes, like the eventual gold medalist, Wolfgang Nordwig, an unfair advantage. Seagren and Isaksson were given substitute poles which they had never used before to jump with. Isaksson, who had lost the world record to Seagren only two months earlier, did not clear a height in the qualifying round and was eliminated, leaving the stadium in disgust afterwards. After Seagren’s last vault, he was so incensed by the way that IAAF officials had handled the event that he took the pole he had been forced to vault with, and handed it back to Paulen. Paulen succeeded David Burghley as IAAF President in 1976 and served in that position until 1981. During Paulen's tenure, he led the fight to control doping within athletics.

== Death and legacy ==
Paulen died during an operation on a broken hip in 1985. The FBK Games in Hengelo were named in Paulen's honor from 1987 to 2000.

Sporting positions
Preceded by (United Kingdom) David Burghley	Presidents of the IAAF; 1976–1981	Succeeded by (Italy) Primo Nebiolo
