= Emerson Norton =

American decathlete

Olympic medal record

Men's athletics

Representing the United States
Silver medal – second place	1924 Paris	Decathlon

Emerson Carlysle Norton (November 16, 1900, in Kansas City, Kansas – March 10, 1986, in Sanford, Florida) was an American athlete who competed mainly in the decathlon event. He competed for the United States in the 1924 Summer Olympics held in Paris, France in the decathlon where he won the silver medal.
