= Josef Machaň =

Czech athlete

Personal information
- Nationality: Czech
- Born: 11 February 1906 Pardubice, Austria-Hungary
- Died: 7 July 1979 (aged 73) Pardubice, Czechoslovakia

Sport
- Sport: Athletics
- Events: Long jump High jump

Josef Machaň (11 February 1906 – 7 July 1979) was a Czech athlete. He competed in the men's long jump and the men's high jump at the 1924 Summer Olympics.
