= Maryam Pougetoux =

French activist

Maryam Pougetoux (born 1999) is a French activist and student union leader. Pougetoux is a current Vice-President of Unef, the National Union of Students of France. Pougetoux was previously the president of the UNEF section of the Sorbonne. Pougetoux was raised in the Paris suburbs by her parents, converts to Islam who originated from the Correze department of southwestern France.

A French Muslim who wears a hijab in public, Pougetoux rose to prominence after a 2018 televised interview while serving as Sorbonne's UNEF president. The interview was on the subject of reforms to college entrance procedures, but attention was immediately focused on her hijab and whether it posed a threat to France's principle of laïcité, or strict secularism.

Pougetoux' choice to wear a hijab was severely criticized by many members of France's establishment, including the incumbent Interior Minister, Gérard Collomb. The ensuing controversy was seen as a continuation of the long-standing Islamic headscarf controversy in France, including a 2004 ban on the wearing of the hijab in schools and by public servants. Pougetoux was caricatured on the front page of satirical magazine Charlie Hebdo in a way that a Guardian opinion writer described as "ape-like". Pougetoux professed to be surprised by the amount of controversy her choice to wear the hijab during the interview had provoked, and said that she was unoffended by her depiction in Charlie Hebdo.

Pougetoux subsequently became a vice-president of the national French student union. In fall 2020, when she testified before the French National Assembly on the impact of the COVID-19 pandemic on students while wearing a hijab, four parliamentarians protested by leaving the meeting.
