= Clifford Argue =

American pentathlete

Personal information
- Born: December 2, 1901 Port Hueneme, California, United States
- Died: April 4, 1970 (aged 68) Newport Beach, California, United States

Sport
- Sport: Athletics
- Event: Pentathlon

Clifford Argue (December 2, 1901 – April 4, 1970) was an American athlete. He competed in the men's pentathlon at the 1924 Summer Olympics.
