= Seiichi Ueda =

Japanese pentathlete

Personal information
- Nationality: Japanese
- Born: 1 March 1899 Izumo, Shimane, Japan

Sport
- Sport: Athletics
- Event: Pentathlon

Seiichi Ueda (born 1 March 1899, date of death unknown) was a Japanese track and field athlete. He competed in the men's pentathlon at the 1924 Summer Olympics.
