= William Comins =

American long jumper

Personal information
- Born: April 16, 1901 Stafford, Connecticut, United States
- Died: July 14, 1965 (aged 64)

Sport
- Sport: Athletics
- Event: Long jump

William Comins (April 16, 1901 – July 14, 1965) was an American athlete. He competed in the men's long jump at the 1924 Summer Olympics.
