= Göran Unger =

Swedish pentathlete

Personal information
- Nationality: Swedish
- Born: 29 September 1899 Bollnäs, Sweden
- Died: 6 April 1982 (aged 82) Danderyd, Sweden

Sport
- Sport: Athletics
- Event: Pentathlon

Göran Unger (29 September 1899 – 6 April 1982) was a Swedish athlete. He competed in the men's pentathlon at the 1924 Summer Olympics.
