= Antti Huusari =

Finnish decathlete

Personal information
- Nationality: Finnish
- Born: 10 July 1898 Kouvola, Grand Duchy of Finland
- Died: 16 February 1973 (aged 74) Kouvola, Finland

Sport
- Sport: Athletics
- Event: Decathlon

Antti Huusari (10 July 1898 – 16 February 1973) was a Finnish athlete. He competed in the men's decathlon at the 1924 Summer Olympics.
