= Josse Ruth =

Belgian athletics competitor

Personal information
- Full name: Joseph Ruth
- Nationality: Belgian
- Born: 30 October 1896 Belgium

Sport
- Country: Belgium
- Sport: Athletics
- Event(s): Pentathlon; Decathlon
- Club: OM Milano

Achievements and titles
- Personal best: Decathlon: 5384 (1924)

Josse Ruth (born 30 October 1896, date of death unknown) was a Belgian athlete. Ruth competed for his native country at the 1924 Summer Olympics in pentathlon and decathlon.

== Achievements ==
Year	Competition	Venue	Position	Event	Performance	Notes
1924	Olympic Games	(France) Paris	19th	Pentathlon	55	
1924	Olympic Games	(France) Paris	17th	Decathlon	5866.670	

== See also ==
- Belgium at the 1924 Summer Olympics
