= Albert Rose (athlete) =

American long jumper

Albert Edward Rose (November 10, 1901 – March 28, 1961) was an American track and field athlete who competed in the 1924 Summer Olympics. He was born in Syracuse, New York. In 1924 he was eliminated in the qualification of the long jump competition and finished ninth overall.
