= Pauli Sandström =

Finnish long jumper

Personal information
- Nationality: Finnish
- Born: 25 December 1899
- Died: 13 March 1988 (aged 88)

Sport
- Sport: Athletics
- Event: Long jump

Pauli Sandström (25 December 1899 – 13 March 1988) was a Finnish athlete. He competed in the men's long jump at the 1924 Summer Olympics.
