= William Shanahan =

Irish decathlete

Personal information
- Nationality: Irish
- Born: 22 March 1897; Kilcarney, County Tipperary, Ireland
- Died: 29 May 1954 (aged 57); County Tipperary, Ireland

Sport
- Sport: Athletics
- Event: Decathlon

William Shanahan (22 March 1897 – 29 May 1954) was an Irish athlete. He competed in the men's decathlon at the 1924 Summer Olympics.
