= Louis-Henri Albinet =

French long jumper (1898–1991)

Personal information
- Full name: Louis Casimir Henri Albinet
- Nationality: French
- Born: 19 July 1898 Narbonne, France
- Died: 22 July 1991 (aged 93) Hyères, France

Sport
- Sport: Athletics
- Event: Long jump

Louis-Henri Albinet (19 July 1898 – 22 July 1991) was a French athlete. He competed in the men's long jump at the 1924 Summer Olympics.
