= Léon Courtejaire =

French pentathlete

Personal information
- Nationality: French
- Born: 1 March 1901
- Died: 30 January 1973 (aged 71)

Sport
- Sport: Athletics
- Event: Pentathlon

Léon Courtejaire (1 March 1901 – 30 January 1973) was a French athlete. He competed in the men's pentathlon at the 1924 Summer Olympics.
