= Martin Mølster =

Norwegian pentathlete

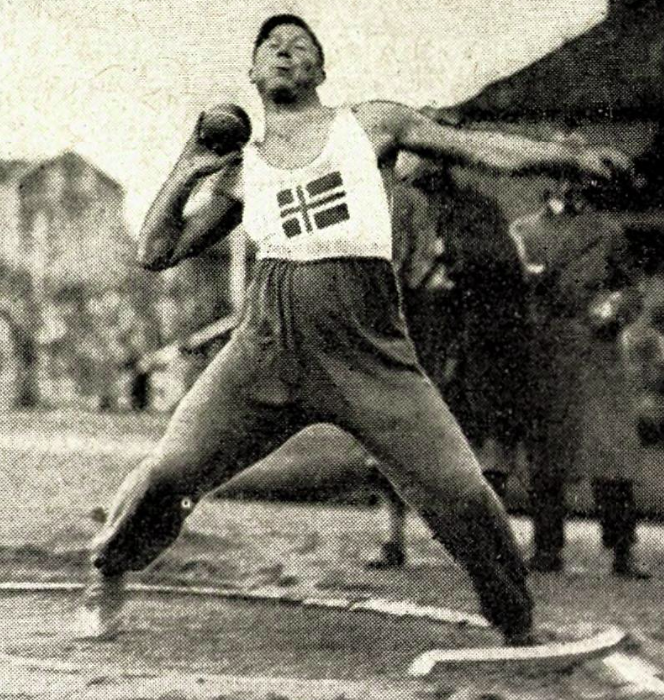
- Martin on 1 September 1930, in a game between Norway and Sweden. He threw 14,13 meters and won, but Norway lost 82–123

Personal information
- Born: 11 October 1900 Voss Municipality, Norway
- Died: 13 March 1968 (aged 67)

Sport
- Sport: Track and field

Martin Mølster (11 October 1900 – 13 March 1968) was a Norwegian pentathlete.

He was born in Voss Municipality, and represented the club IL Bjart. He competed in pentathlon at the 1924 Summer Olympics, when he placed eleventh.
