= Mort Kaer =

American football player and pentathlete (1903–1992)

Profile
- Position: Halfback

Personal information
- Born: September 7, 1903; Omaha, Nebraska, U.S.
- Died: January 11, 1992 (aged 88); Mount Shasta, California, U.S.

Career information
- College: USC

Career history
- 1931: Frankford Yellow Jackets

Awards and highlights
- Consensus All-American (1926); First-team All-PCC (1926)
- College Football Hall of Fame

Morton Armour Kaer (September 7, 1903 – January 11, 1992), nicknamed "Devil May", was an American athlete in track and an All-American collegiate and professional football player. He was born in Omaha, Nebraska, and died in Mount Shasta, California.

At the 1924 Summer Olympics in Paris, he placed fifth in the Olympic pentathlon competition.

He was a halfback for the USC Trojans from 1924 to 1926. In 1925, he set a school record by scoring 19 touchdowns, which led the nation that year, tying Peggy Flournoy's mark. The record lasted 43 years, broken in 1968 by O. J. Simpson. In Kaer's three years he had 36 touchdowns, a career record for the school, tied by Simpson in 1967 and 1968. He was elected All-American in 1926.

Five years after his college career, Kaer played one year of professional football, 1931, with the Frankford Yellow Jackets of the National Football League. He became coach at Weed High School in Weed, California, where he accumulated a record of 187–47–7 over 28 years in which his teams won 17 conference championships.

He was elected to the College Football Hall of Fame in 1972.
