= Ettore Uicich =

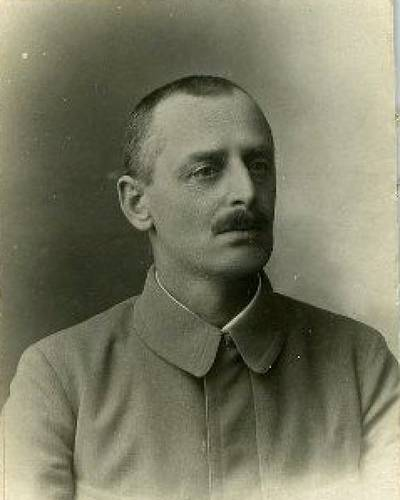
- Born: Ettore Vittorio Uicich; 16 July 1870; Pisino, Istria, Austria-Hungary
- Died: 19 July 1915 (aged 45); Monte Calvario, Austria-Hungary
- Military career
- Allegiance: Kingdom of Italy
- Rank: Bersalier Lieutenant
- Unit: Brigata "Re"
- Conflicts: Battle of Podgora
- Awards: Silver Medal of Military Valor

Ettore Uicich (16 July 1870 – 19 July 1915) was an Istrian Italian irredentist and war volunteer.

== Biography ==
Ettore Vittorio Uicich was born in Pisino, Istria (then under Austrian rule), on 16 July 1870. A trader by profession, Uicich was an ardent irredentist already in his youth. He always strove for the "Italianness" of "his hometown and of all of Istria". In 1908, he founded the Italian cycling club Intrepido in his hometown of Pisino (now Pazin, Croatia). During World War I, in July 1914, he received a letter of drafting by Austria-Hungary. Uicich, however, had already left his family and was moving to Italy. Before leaving Pisino, he put his Italian flag into a box and dug it in an alley as a token of "faith and hope". It was dug up by his friends in October 1916, dug in a safer place, and dug up again and displayed on his house upon the entry of the Bersaglieri in Pisino in November 1918. His flag is now kept in the Museum of the Risorgimento (Modena) of Modena.

In Italy, Uicich advocated for interventionism, and when Italy entered the war, despite his age of 45, he joined the Italian Army as a volunteer in Udine. He joined the infantry regiment Brigata "Re", holding the rank of Bersalier Lieutenant.

He was killed in the Battle of Podgora. He was posthumously awarded the Silver Medal of Military Valor.
