= Marcel Guillouet =

French long jumper

Personal information
- Nationality: French
- Born: 14 February 1898
- Died: 8 April 1973 (aged 75)

Sport
- Sport: Athletics
- Event: Long jump

Marcel Guillouet (14 February 1898 – 8 April 1973) was a French athlete. He competed in the men's long jump at the 1924 Summer Olympics.
