= Leo Leino =

Finnish decathlete and pentathlete

Personal information
- Full name: Oskar Leo Leino
- Nationality: Finnish
- Born: 21 April 1900 Uusikaupunki, Varsinais-Suomi, Finland
- Died: 21 June 1988 (aged 88) Luumäki, Etelä-Karjala, Finland
- Height: 5 ft 11 in (180 cm)
- Weight: 163 lb (74 kg)

Sport
- Country: Finland
- Sport: Athletics

Oskar Leo Leino (21 April 1900 – 21 June 1988), known as Leo Leino, was a Finnish athlete who competed at the 1924 Summer Olympics. He was a pentathlete and gained a total of 23 points in the final.
