= Alois Sobotka =

Czech long jumper

Personal information
- Nationality: Czech
- Born: 5 February 1904 Uherské Hradiště, Austria-Hungary
- Died: 1 June 1977 (aged 73)

Sport
- Country: Czechoslovakia
- Sport: Athletics
- Event: Long jump

Alois Sobotka (5 February 1904 – 1 June 1977) was a Czech athlete. He competed for Czechoslovakia in the men's long jump at the 1924 Summer Olympics.
