= Adolfo Contoli =

Combined events (1898–1988)

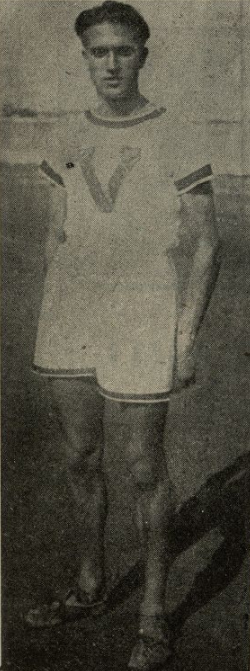
- Adolfo Contoli

Personal information
- National team: Italy: 1 cap (1924)
- Born: 19 February 1898 Bologna, Italy
- Died: 28 May 1988 (aged 90)

Sport
- Country: Italy
- Sport: Athletics
- Event: Combined events
- Club: Virtus Bologna

Achievements and titles
- Personal best: Decathlon: 5543 pt (1924)

Adolfo Contoli (19 February 1898 – 28 May 1988) was an Italian versatile athlete. He participated at the 1924 Summer Olympics. He was born in Bologna.

== Achievements ==
Year	Competition	Venue	Position	Event	Performance	Note
1908	Olympic Games	(France) Paris	15th	Pentathlon	3 events	
1908	Olympic Games	(France) Paris	11th	Decathlon	5,543 pt.	

== National titles ==
Adolfo Contoli has won 24 times the individual national championship.

- 5 wins on 100 metres hurdles (1921, 1922, 1923, 1924, 1926)
- 2 wins on 400 metres hurdles (1920, 1921)
- 1 win on Pole vault (1923)
- 2 wins on Long jump (1920, 1922)
- 3 wins on Standing high jump (1920, 1921, 1922)
- 3 wins on Standing long jump (1920, 1921, 1922)
- 3 wins on Standing triple jump (1920, 1921, 1922)
- 4 wins on Pentathlon (1921, 1922, 1923, 1924)
- 1 win on Decathlon (1922)

== See also ==
- Men's long jump Italian record progression
- Italian Athletics Championships - Multi winners
