= Veljko Ugrinić =

Croatian footballer

Personal information
- Date of birth: 28 December 1885
- Place of birth: Stara Gradiška, Croatia-Slavonia, Austria-Hungary
- Date of death: 15 July 1958 (aged 72)
- Place of death: Zagreb, PR Croatia, FPR Yugoslavia

Managerial career
- Years: Team
- 1920–1924: Yugoslavia

Veljko Ugrinić (28 December 1885 – 15 July 1958) was a Croatian football manager. He coached ten matches of the Yugoslavia national football team between 1920 and 1924.
