= Paul Couillaud =

French long jumper

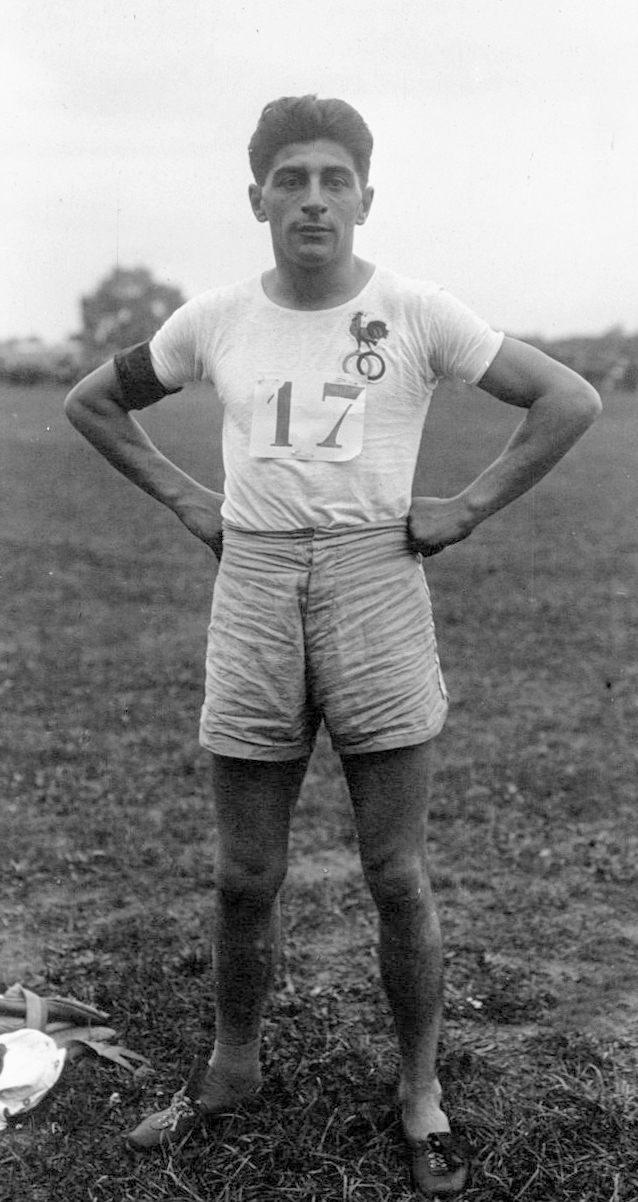
- Paul Couillaud in 1921

Personal information
- Born: 31 December 1893
- Died: 15 March 1962 (aged 68)

Sport
- Sport: Athletics
- Event: Long jump
- Club: Stade français, Paris

Achievements and titles
- Personal best: 7.05 m (1923)

Paul Couillaud (31 December 1893 – 15 March 1962) was a French long jumper. He competed at the 1924 Summer Olympics and finished 24th.
