= Peroslav Ferković =

Croatian decathlete

Personal information
- Nationality: Croatian
- Born: 26 April 1903; Zagreb, Austria-Hungary
- Died: 11 January 1982 (aged 78); Zagreb, Yugoslavia

Sport
- Sport: Athletics
- Event: Decathlon

Peroslav Ferković (26 April 1903 – 11 January 1982) was a Croatian athlete. He competed in the men's decathlon at the 1924 Summer Olympics, representing Yugoslavia.
