= Albino Pighi =

Italian track and field athlete

Personal information
- Nationality: Italian
- Born: 13 May 1903 Verona
- Died: 15 October 1971 (aged 68) Verona

Sport
- Country: Italy
- Sport: Athletics
- Event(s): Shot put Discus throw Combined events

Albino Pighi (13 May 1903 - 15 October 1971) was an Italian shot putter. discus thrower and pentathlete who competed at the 1924 Summer Olympics.

== National titles ==
He won twelve times the national championships at senior level.

- Italian Athletics Championships
  - Shot put: 1924, 1925, 1926, 1928, 1930, 1932 (6)
  - Discus throw: 1924, 1925, 1926, 1928, 1930, 1931 (6)
