= Edward Gourdin =

American athlete and jurist (1897-1966)

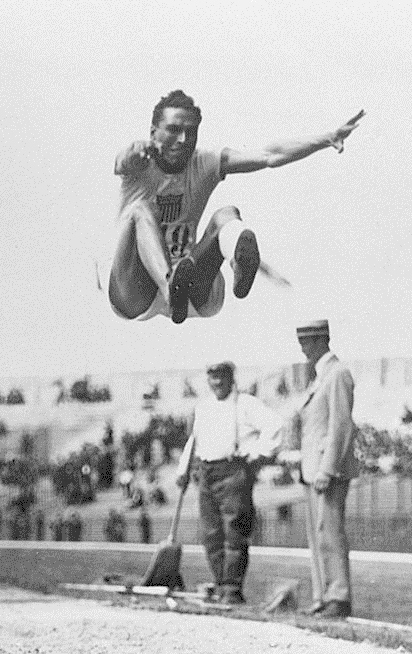
- Gourdin at the 1924 Olympics

Personal information
- Full name: Edward Orval Gourdin
- Born: August 10, 1897 Jacksonville, Florida, U.S.
- Died: July 22, 1966 (aged 68) Quincy, Massachusetts, U.S.
- Education: Harvard University
- Height: 6 ft 0 in (1.83 m)
- Weight: 174 lb (79 kg)

Sport
- Country: United States
- Sport: Athletics
- Event: Long jump
- Club: Dorchester Club

Achievements and titles
- Personal best: 7.69 m (1921)
Medal record
Men's athletics
Representing the United States
Olympic Games
Silver medal – second place	1924 Paris	Long jump

Edward Orval Gourdin (August 10, 1897 – July 22, 1966) was an American athlete and jurist. He was the first man in history to make 25 feet in the long jump and the first African-American and the first self-identified Native American (Seminole descent) to be appointed a Superior Court judge in New England.

He won the silver medal in the long jump at the 1924 Summer Olympics in Paris, France. Following his return from the Olympics, Gourdin was admitted to the bar. He left his law practice in 1935 to serve as Assistant United States Attorney from Massachusetts. In 1951 he was appointed to the Roxbury District Court. On July 22, 1958, he was appointed by governor Foster Furcolo to serve on the Massachusetts Superior Court, the Commonwealth's second highest court. He remained on the court until his death on July 22, 1966.

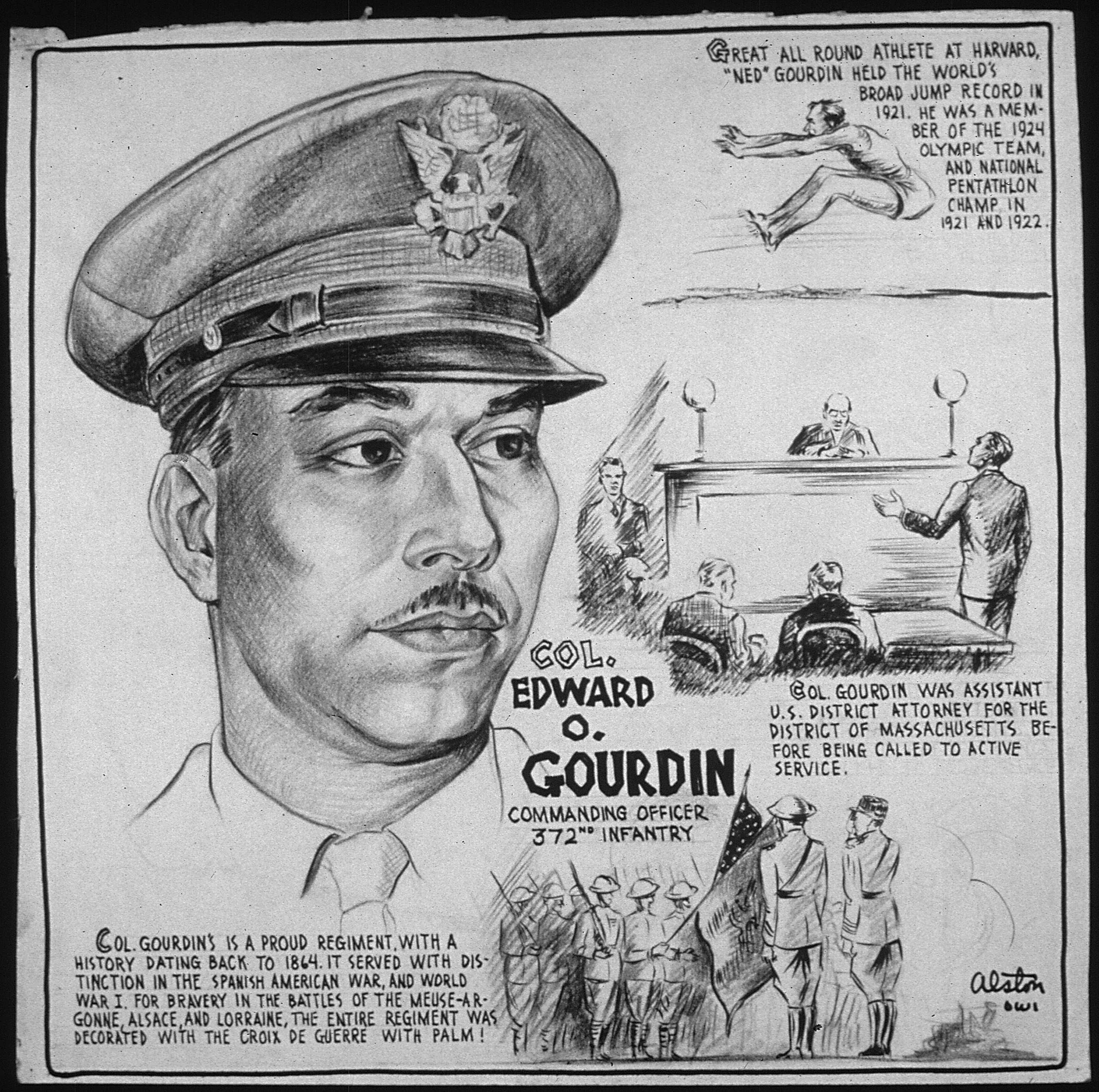
Illustration of Edward Gourdin by Charles Henry Alston

Gourdin attended Harvard University, where he was a member of Alpha Phi Alpha fraternity.

== See also ==
- List of African-American jurists
