= Roger Viel =

French Olympian hurdler (1902–1981)

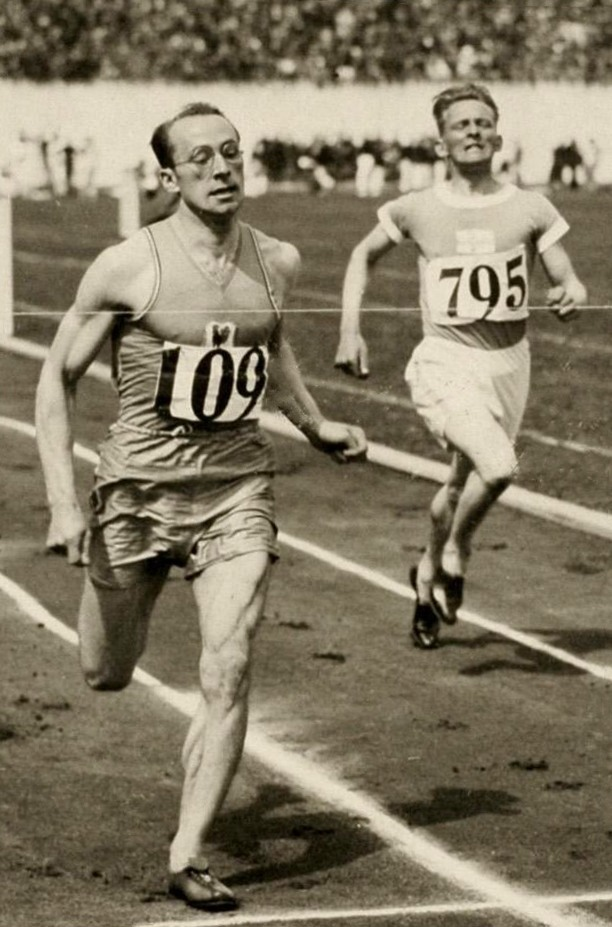
- Roger Viel (left) at the 1928 Olympics

Personal information
- Born: 27 October 1902 Caen, France
- Died: 3 October 1981 (aged 78) ouveciennes, Yvelines, France
- Height: 180 cm (5 ft 11 in)
- Weight: 70 kg (154 lb)

Sport
- Sport: Athletics
- Club: Stade français, Paris

Roger Germain Jean Viel (27 October 1902 – 3 October 1981) was a French athlete who competed at two Olympic Games.

== Career ==
Viel competed at the 1924 Olympic Games with the best achievement of 16th place in the pentathlon in 1924.

Viel finished third behind Lord Burghley in the 440 yards hurdles event at the 1928 AAA Championships. Shortly afterwards he represented France again at the 1928 Olympic Games in Amsterdam, Netherlands, where he competed in the 400 metres hurdles and pentathlon.
