= Antoni Cejzik =

Polish decathlete (1900–1939)

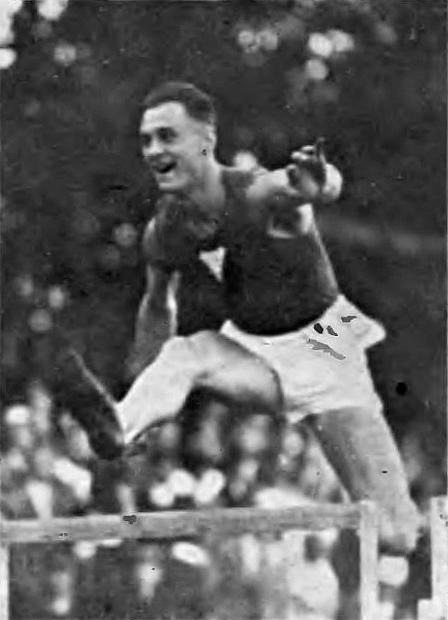
- Antoni Cejzik in 1927

Personal information
- Nationality: Polish
- Born: 15 May 1900 Yelets, Russian Empire
- Died: 12 September 1939 (aged 39) Brwinów, Poland

Sport
- Sport: Athletics
- Event: Decathlon

Antoni Cejzik (15 May 1900 – 12 September 1939) was a Polish athlete. He moved to Poland in 1924 as an eight-time Soviet champion in various athletics competitions and the Soviet record holder in decathlon.

Cejzik competed in the men's decathlon at the 1924 Summer Olympics and the 1928 Summer Olympics. He was killed in action during World War II.
