= Elemér Somfay =

Hungarian pentathlete

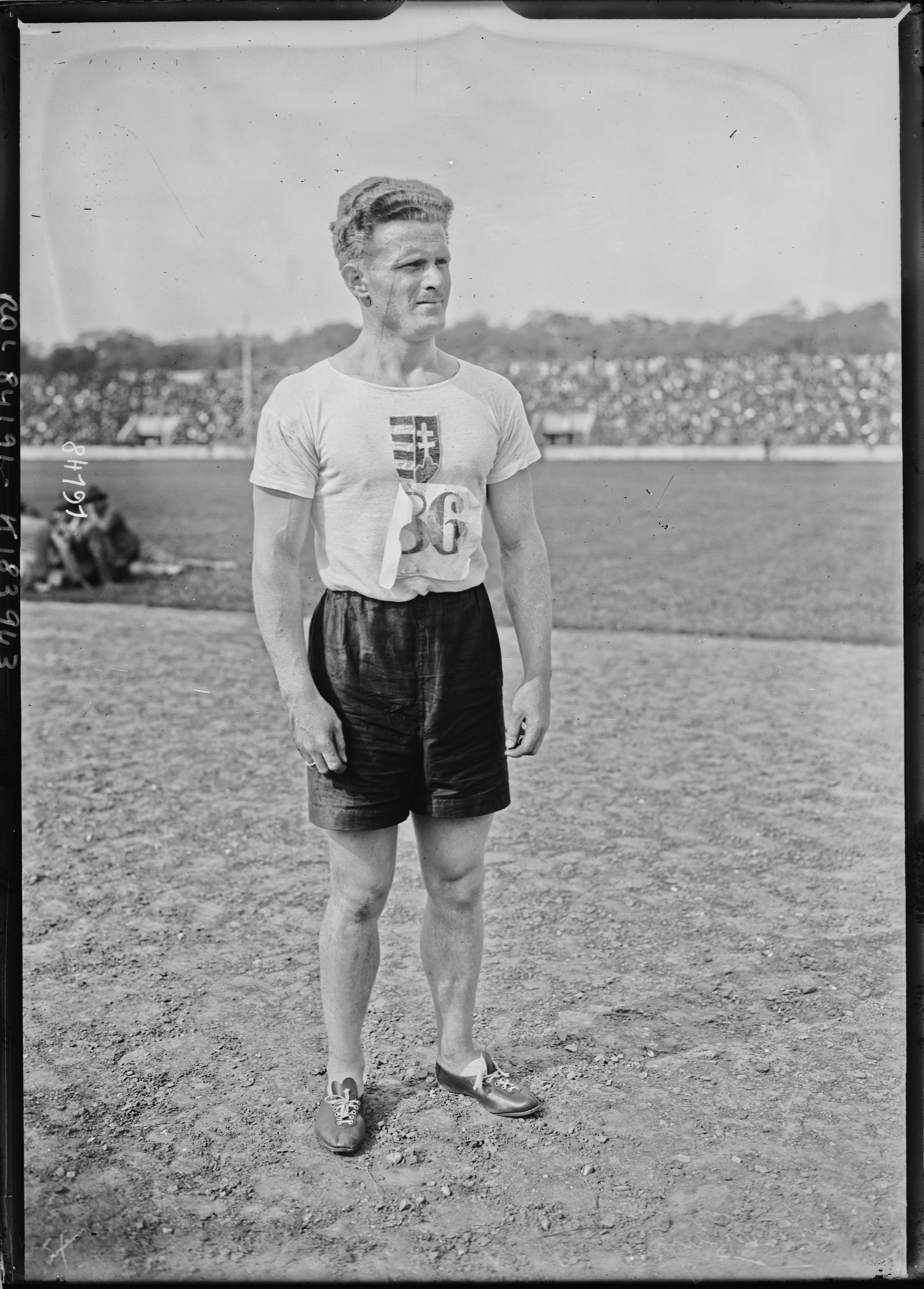

Personal information
- Born: 28 August 1898 Budapest, Hungary
- Died: 15 May 1979 (aged 80) Budapest, Hungary

Sport
- Sport: Pentathlon, modern pentathlon
- Club: Magyar AK/Ludovika Akadémia Sportegyesület
Medal record
Men's athletics
Representing Hungary
Olympic Games
| Silver medal – second place | 1924 Paris | Pentathlon |

Elemér Somfay (28 August 1898 – 15 May 1979) was a Hungarian athlete who competed mainly in the pentathlon and competed at the 1924 Summer Olympics.

== Career ==
Somfay competed for a Hungary at the 1924 Olympic Games held in Paris, France, in the Pentathlon, where he won the silver medal.

The following year Somfay won the British AAA Championships title in the triple jump event at the 1925 AAA Championships. Somfay finished third behind Willem Peters at the 1927 AAA Championships.

He later competed in the modern pentathlon at the 1932 Summer Olympics.
