= Dennis Duigan =

Australian decathlete

Personal information
- Full name: Dennistoun Vaughan Duigan
- Nationality: Australian
- Born: 16 December 1902 Elwood, Victoria, Australia
- Died: 17 June 1962 (aged 59) Sunnybank, Queensland, Australia

Sport
- Sport: Athletics
- Event: Decathlon

Dennistoun Vaughan Duigan (16 December 1902 – 17 June 1962) was an Australian athlete. He competed in the men's decathlon at the 1924 Summer Olympics. He was born in Elwood, a suburb of Melbourne, Victoria.
