= Percy Spark =

British decathlete

Personal information
- Full name: Arthur Percy Spark
- Nationality: British
- Born: 4 June 1894 Durris, Scotland
- Died: 29 August 1953 (aged 59) Stoke-on-Trent, England

Sport
- Sport: Athletics
- Event: Decathlon

Arthur Percy Spark (4 June 1894 – 29 August 1953) was a British athlete. He competed in the men's decathlon at the 1924 Summer Olympics. Later, he was Lord Mayor of Stoke-on-Trent between 1949 and 1950.
