= Bertil Fastén =

Swedish decathlete

Personal information
- Nationality: Swedish
- Born: 1 April 1900 Stockholm, Sweden
- Died: 18 January 1928 (aged 27) Uppsala, Sweden

Sport
- Sport: Athletics
- Event: Decathlon

Bertil Fastén (1 April 1900 – 18 January 1928) was a Swedish athlete. He competed in the men's decathlon at the 1924 Summer Olympics.
