= Đuro Gašpar =

Croatian decathlete (1900–1981)

Personal information
- Nationality: Croatian
- Born: 22 April 1900 Zagreb, Austria-Hungary
- Died: 21 October 1981 (aged 81) Zagreb, Yugoslavia

Sport
- Sport: Athletics
- Event: Decathlon

Đuro Gašpar (22 April 1900 – 21 October 1981) was a Croatian athlete. He competed in the men's decathlon at the 1924 Summer Olympics, representing Yugoslavia.
