= Antonín Svoboda (athlete) =

Czech sprinter

Personal information
- Nationality: Czechoslovak
- Born: 12 January 1900
- Died: 29 October 1965 (aged 65) Znojmo, Czechoslovakia

Sport
- Sport: Track and field
- Events: 100m, pentathlon

Antonín Svoboda (12 January 1900 – 29 October 1965) was a Czechoslovak sprinter. He competed in the men's 100 metres and the pentathlon events at the 1924 Summer Olympics.
