= Donald Slack =

British decathlete (1896–1973)

Personal information
- Nationality: British
- Born: 16 July 1896 Upton-upon-Severn, England
- Died: 23 September 1973 (aged 77) Worcester, England

Sport
- Sport: Athletics
- Event: Decathlon

Donald Slack (16 July 1896 – 23 September 1973) was a British athlete. He competed in the men's decathlon at the 1924 Summer Olympics.
