= Union Nationale des Étudiants de France =

French student union

National Union of Students of France Union nationale des étudiants de France
- Institution: France's universities
- Location: 127, rue de l'Ourcq - 75019 Paris, France
- Established: 4 May 1907; 119 years ago
- President: Manon Moret
- Members: 30,000 claimed (2021)
- Affiliations: European Students' Union
- Website: www.unef.fr

The National Union of Students of France (French: Union nationale des étudiants de France, pronounced [ynjɔ̃ nɑsjɔnal dez‿etydjɑ̃ də fʁɑ̃s]; abbr. UNEF) is a national students' union in France. It is historically close to the Socialist Party, with many of its members joining the party after leaving student life.

It works to represent the interest of students for national and local governments, political parties, the government bodies concerned with higher education and their administration of the universities. The organisation is also active on the international arena.

== History ==
1907: UNEF foundation by the merging of many AGEs (Associations Générales d'Étudiants, Students' General Associations) from different towns at a meeting held in Lille.

1923: Organised the 1923 International Universities Championships. (Note: In 1918, students' union presidents in the United Kingdom expressed the need to have an association to promote sport at universities across the country. The Inter-Varsity Athletics Board of England and Wales (IVAB) was established in 1919 and organised the first inter-varsity track and field meeting that year at Manchester University.)

1946: Adoption of the Charter of Grenoble which define the student as a "young intellectual worker". Since then, the UNEF has considered itself to be a part of the labour movement. The creation in France of the students' social security and welfare systems are the result of UNEF activism.

1950s: The UNEF led the protest for independence of Algeria.

1968: May 68 revolt. On 27 May the meeting of the UNEF, most outstanding of the events of May 68, proceeds and gathers 30.000 to 50.000 people in the Stade Sebastien Charlety.

1971 to 2001: The UNEF was split between UNEF-SE (Solidarité Étudiante, Students' solidarity) (linked to the French Communist Party) and UNEF-US (Unité Syndicale, Union Unity), which later evolved into UNEF-ID (Indépendante et Démocratique, Independence and democracy) (linked to the Internationalist Communist Organisation and close to the Socialist Party).

1986: The UNEFs led a victorious strike against student fees and selection at college admission.

1995: Major protests against a government project of minimum wage for youth lower than for other salaries.

2001: The UNEFs eventually reunified under the name 'UNEF'.

2001: Yassir Fichtali elected new chairman.

2005: Bruno Julliard elected new chairman.

2006: The UNEF played a major role in students' contestation of the prime minister Dominique de Villepin's Contrat première embauche.

2007: Jean-Baptiste Prévost elected new chairman.

2011: Emmanuel Zemmour elected new chairman.

2014: William Martinet elected new chairman.

2016: Lilâ Le Bas elected new chairman.

2019: Mélanie Luce elected new chairman.

== Democracy ==
Today, the UNEF is still composed of the different AGEs. There is one AGE in each town where a university is located, except in Paris, where there is an AGE by university. Membership is individual: every student can choose to join the AGE of his/her home town.

The UNEF holds a national conference every two years. National conference is the sovereign body of the UNEF and decide the UNEF policy.

Conferences are contested by factions:

- Majorité Nationale (National Majority): 80% of the votes in 2007
- Tendance pour une UNEF Unitaire et Démocratique (For a unitarian and democratic UNEF): 13%
- Tendance Refondation Syndicale (Union's refoundation): 7%

The conference also elects an administrative commission (Commission Administrative) to be the UNEF 'parliament' between conferences. The commission elects the National Board, the executive body.

== Related organisations ==
The UNEF has created many national federations:

- CECED (Comité Étudiant Contre l'Extrême Droite, Students' Committee against Far Right)
- FERUF (Fédération des Étudiants en Résidences Universitaires de France, Resident Students Federation)
- UCEF (Union des Coopératives Étudiantes de France, Union of Students' Cooperatives)
- FENEC (Fédération Nationale des Étudiants Chercheurs)

The UNEF has also participated in the creation of different bodies related to students:

- MNEF, then replaced by LMDE in 2000 (La Mutuelle Des Etudiants) which operates the students' social security system
- ESIB in 1981, named ESU in 2007 (European Students Union)

== Controversies ==
=== Gender-based and sexual violence ===
Amid the international backdrop of allegations against Harvey Weinstein reported by The New York Times and The New Yorker the French daily newspaper Le Monde published in November 2017 two detailed investigations into alleged sexual harassment and predation within UNEF, implicating former presidents Jean-Baptiste Prévost and Emmanuel Zemmour. In an editorial, over 80 current and former female members and activists of UNEF signed an open letter denouncing “an exacerbated expression of physical and sexual domination” and calling out a “system of sexual predation” that had developed under Prévost and continued under Zemmour. In response, Prévost acknowledged that the organisation was “undoubtedly not free from reproach”.

In spite of multiple pressions, the daily newspaper Libération published in February 2018 a long article with sixteen testimonies of female activists who have suffered from rape, sexual harassment and abuse within the organisation.

In December 2017, the president of the UNEF chapter in Nice, Paul Morançay, resigned after it was revealed that the local branch had attempted to suppress a rape complaint filed by a student against a masseur recommended by the chapter. The cover-up reportedly prompted the departure of a large portion of the branch’s members Following these revelations, UNEF established a dedicated email address to collect testimonies from victims[90]. While UNEF president Lilâ Le Bas asserted that “silence and the code of omertà no longer prevail”, the scandal highlighted enduring issues of moral harassment and systemic sexism within the organisation.

Despite multiple pressures the newspaper Libération published in February 2018 an extensive follow-up article containing sixteen testimonies from female activists who reported rape, sexual harassment, and other abuses within UNEF. The revelations prompted ongoing scrutiny of the student union’s internal culture and governance.

=== Allegations of discrimination and racism ===
In March 2019, UNEF joined in the protests and criticisms organised by anti-racist activists—including the Ligue de défense noire africaine, the Brigade anti-négrophobie, and the CRAN—against the staging of The Suppliants by Aeschylus at the Sorbonne. The activists objected to the actresses portraying the Danaïdes (Egyptians in the play) who wore darkened makeup and copper-coloured masks, practices they considered to constitute blackface[105]. UNEF characterised this as the “perpetuation of racist patterns”. Cultural figures criticised the protests as a “logic of fundamentalist and identity-based censorship”. Both the Ministers of Higher Education and of Culture “strongly condemned this unprecedented violation of freedom of expression”. Pierre Jourde, a former UNEF official at Paris XII, described the union as having become “stupid, totalitarian, illiterate, and obscurantist,” calling it “a union of Taliban”.

In 2021, UNEF became the focus of controversy when its president stated in a radio interview that the union was convening meetings from which white individuals were excluded.

=== Accusation of Islamophobia ===
Regarding the wearing of the veil, UNEF took a position in 2013 opposing its display within university premises.

However, in 2018, when a veiled UNEF official at Paris IV University faced criticism—some perceiving a contradiction with the union’s feminist values and the display of a religious symbol—UNEF defended her. Former UNEF president Bruno Julliard stated that “UNEF’s discourse in defending the veil tramples decades of struggle”. Similarly, Jean-Christophe Cambadélis, another former president, remarked: “This veiled woman is a provocation. If UNEF does not return to a more union-focused approach, prioritising the defence of student rights, they will end up as a small sect”.

According to an investigation by Abel Mestre of Le Monde, UNEF established a prayer room in 2015 during a national collective meeting at the request of Muslim activists. The journalist noted that it was “an episode that will not be repeated”. The union later changed its approach, as its membership declined and agreements were made with Étudiants musulmans de France during several student elections.

In January 2018, alongside the union Solidaires étudiant-e-s at Paris VII University, UNEF attempted to prevent a performance of the play Letter to the Scammers of Islamophobia Who Play into the Hands of Racists, adapted from Charb’s book, on the grounds that the event “contributes to the racist construction of an internal enemy within a racialised and dangerous category: the Muslim”.

UNEF’s positions on these issues have been criticised by intellectuals, journalists, and political parties. Jack Dion, deputy editorial director of Marianne, argued that the union was rehabilitating blasphemy.

On 17 September 2020, during a parliamentary hearing on “COVID-19 and Youth,” three deputies from Les Républicains (Marianne Dubois, Pierre-Henri Dumont, Frédéric Reiss) and a representative of the presidential majority (Anne-Christine Lang) walked out in protest against the presence of UNEF vice-president Maryam Pougetoux, who was wearing a hijab. However, the committee chair, Sandrine Mörch, stated that “no rules prohibit the wearing of religious symbols for those being heard”.

On 19 October 2020, following the decapitation of history teacher Samuel Paty, UNEF members participating in demonstrations were booed, with attendees criticising statements made by UNEF officials regarding Islamism.
