= Iivari Yrjölä =

Finnish decathlete

Personal information
- Nationality: Finnish
- Born: 10 September 1899 Hämeenkyrö, Grand Duchy of Finland
- Died: 11 November 1985 (aged 86) Vilppula, Finland

Sport
- Sport: Athletics
- Event: Decathlon

Iivari Yrjölä (10 September 1899 – 11 November 1985) was a Finnish athlete. He competed in the men's decathlon at the 1924 Summer Olympics.
