= Georgios Zacharopoulos =

Greek athlete

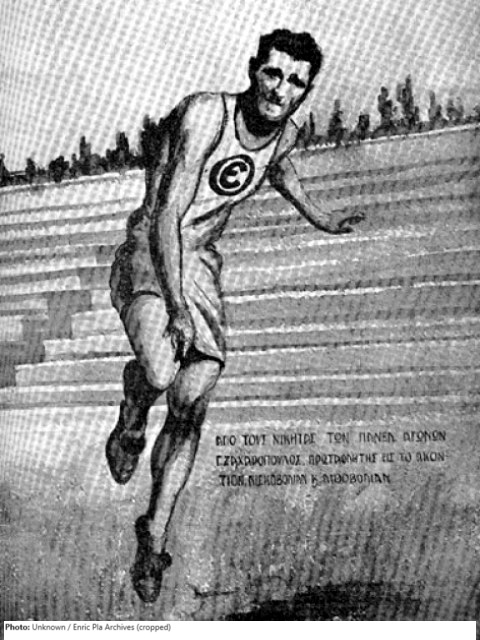

Personal information
- Native name: Γεώργιος Ζαχαρόπουλος
- National team: Greece
- Born: 29 December 1897 Agioi Pantes, Phocis
- Died: 23 March 1978 (aged 80) Athens
- Years active: 1920 - 1934
- Height: 1.97 m (6 ft 6 in)

Sport
- Country: Greece
- Sport: Athletics
- Event(s): Javelin Throw, Stone Throw, Discus Throw, Pentathlon, Long Jump
- Club: Panionios G.S , Ethnikos G.S.

Achievements and titles
- Olympic finals: 1924,1928
- Personal best: Javelin Throw : 63.41m (1930)

Georgios Zacharopoulos (born 29 December 1897, 23 March 1978) was a Greek athlete. He competed at the 1924 Summer Olympics and the 1928 Summer Olympics. He was a Balkan champion in the sport of javelin in 1929 and 1930 and as the Greek champion in javelin, discus throw, and stone throw.

== Greek Athletics Championship Results ==
His recorded participations in Panhellenic games were between 1925 and 1929. He won 18 medals (11 Gold, 5 Silver, 2 Bronze) during his presence in the games. The table below lists his performances.

| Year | Javelin Throw | Discus Throw | Stone Throw | Greek Discus Throw | Shot Put |
|---|---|---|---|---|---|
| 1925 | Gold | Silver | Gold | Bronze | Silver |
| 1926 | Gold | DNP | Gold | DNP | Silver |
| 1927 | Gold | Gold | Gold | Gold | Silver |
| 1928 | Gold | Bronze | Gold | DNP | Silver |
| 1929 | Gold | DNP | DNP | DNP | DNP |
| Total | 5 | 3 | 4 | 2 | 4 |

== Balkan Athletics Championship Results ==
He took part in the inaugural balkan athletics championship in 1929 winning one gold medal in javelin throw. Also he competed in the 1930 edition winning another javelin throw gold.

| Year | Event | Classification | Performance in m |
|---|---|---|---|
| 1929 | Javelin Throw | 1 | 60.51 |
| 1930 | Javelin Throw | 1 | 63.41 |

== 1924 & 1928 Summer Olympic Games ==
In the 1924 games in Paris he competed in various track and field events and was also the flag bearer for the Greek delegation at the closing ceremony of the games. In the 1928 games in Amsterdam he competed in various track and field events. The table below lists his performances.

| Year | Host | Event | Classification |
|---|---|---|---|
| 1924 | Paris, France | Javelin Throw | 15th |
| 1924 | Paris, France | Discus Throw | 30th |
| 1924 | Paris, France | 4x100 Relay | Did Not Start |
| 1924 | Paris, France | Triple Jump | Did Not Start |
| 1924 | Paris, France | Modern Pentathlon | Did Not Start |
| 1928 | Amsterdam, The Netherlands | Shot Put | Did Not Start |
| 1928 | Amsterdam, The Netherlands | Discus Throw | Did Not Start |
| 1928 | Amsterdam, The Netherlands | Javelin Throw | 20 r1/2 |
