= Sverre Hansen (athlete) =

Norwegian long jumper (1899–1991)

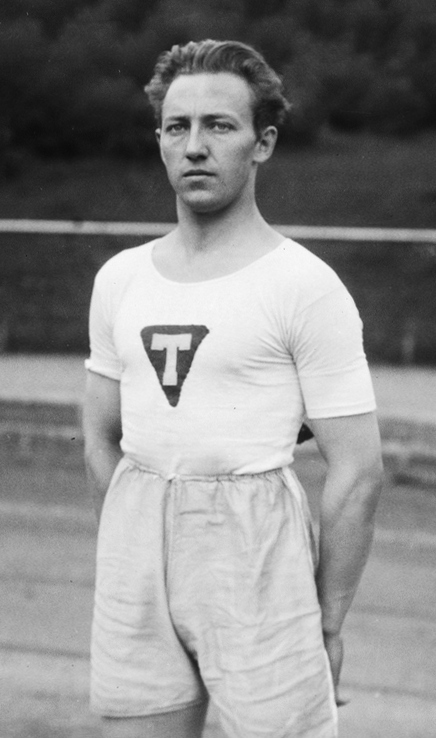
- Sverre Hansen, Oslo 1924

Personal information
- Born: 12 November 1899 Oslo, Norway
- Died: 25 February 1991 (aged 91) Oslo, Norway

Sport
- Sport: Athletics
- Event: high jump/ long jump
- Club: Torodd IF, Oslo
Medal record
Men's athletics
Representing Norway
Bronze medal – third place	1924 Paris	Long jump

Sverre Hilmar Hansen (12 November 1899 – 25 February 1991) was a Norwegian long jumper, who competed at the Olympic Games.

== Career ==
Hansen was Norwegian champion in long jump in 1921–1924. He finished second behind Pierre Lewden in the high jump event and second behind fellow Norwegian Charles Hoff in the long jump evvent at the British 1922 AAA Championships.

At the 1924 Summer Olympics he won a bronze medal with a jump of 7.26 metres. His personal best jump was 7.285 metres, achieved in August 1924 in Kristiania.
