= Gabriel Sempé =

French athletics competitor

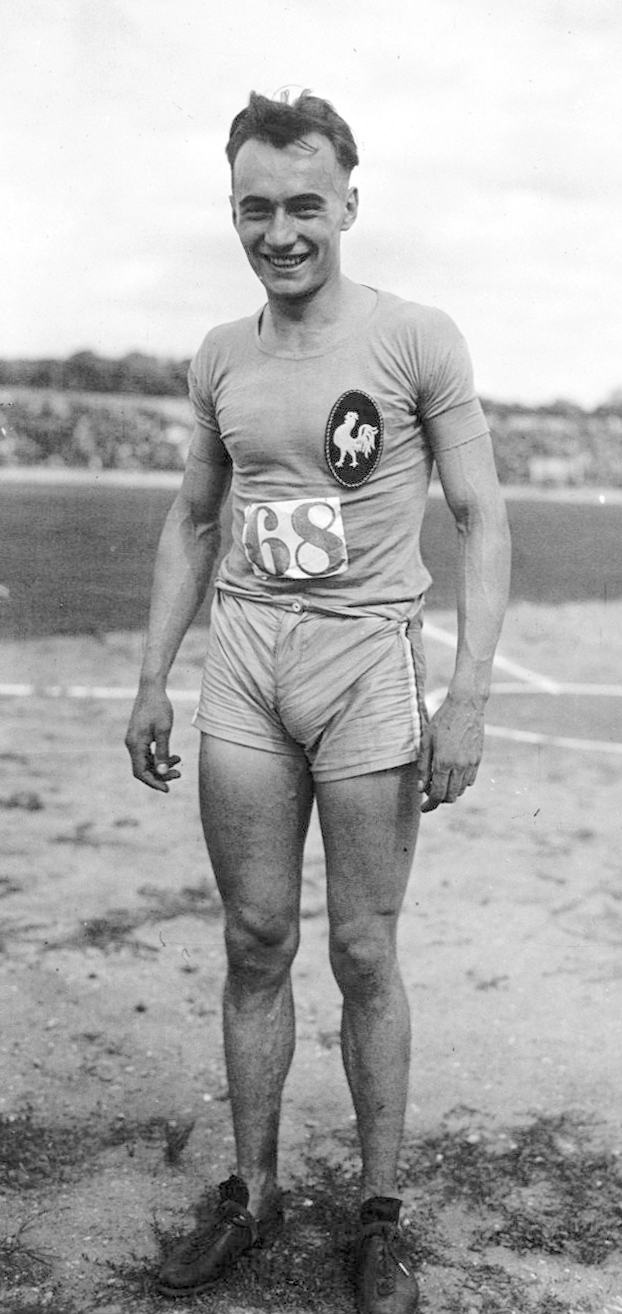
- Gabriel Sempé in 1923

Personal information
- Born: 2 April 1901 Tarbes, France
- Died: 24 February 1990 (aged 88)
- Height: 188 cm (6 ft 2 in)
- Weight: 76 kg (168 lb)

Sport
- Sport: Athletics
- Event(s): Sprint, hurdles, long jump, decathlon
- Club: Bordeaux EC; Ecole de Joinville

Achievements and titles
- Personal best(s): 100 m – 10.8 (1926); 110 mH – 14.8 (1928); LJ – 7.06 m (1923)

Gabriel Sempé (2 April 1901 – 24 February 1990) was a French athlete. He competed in the 110 m hurdles at the 1924 and 1928 Summer Olympics, but failed to reach the finals; in 1924 he also did not finish his decathlon programme.
