= Fred Zinner =

Belgian sprinter (1903–1994)

Sigismond "Fred" Zinner
Personal information
- Nationality: Belgian
- Born: 14 August 1903 Antwerp, Belgium
- Died: 6 January 1994 (aged 90)

Sport
- Sport: Sprinting
- Event: 100 metres

Fred Zinner (14 August 1903 – 6 January 1994) was a Belgian sprinter. He competed in the men's 100 metres at the 1928 Summer Olympics.
