= Constant Bucher =

Swiss decathlete

Personal information
- Nationality: Swiss
- Born: 6 February 1900
- Died: 11 March 1985 (aged 85)

Sport
- Sport: Athletics
- Event: Decathlon

Constant Bucher (6 February 1900 – 11 March 1985) was a Swiss athlete. He competed in the men's decathlon at the 1920 Summer Olympics and the 1924 Summer Olympics.
