= Stelios Benardis =

Greek decathlete

Personal information
- Nationality: Greek
- Born: 1907

Sport
- Sport: Athletics
- Event: Decathlon

Stelios Benardis (born 1907, date of death unknown) was a Greek athlete. He competed in the decathlon at the 1924 Summer Olympics and the 1928 Summer Olympics.
