= Harry de Keijser =

Dutch athlete (1900–1995)

Personal information
- Nationality: Dutch
- Born: 11 September 1900 Roosendaal, Netherlands
- Died: 2 January 1995 (aged 94) Leusden, Netherlands

Sport
- Sport: Athletics
- Event: Pole vault

Harry de Keijser (11 September 1900 – 2 January 1995) was a Dutch athlete. He competed in three events at the 1924 Summer Olympics.
