= Battle of Podgora =

World War I battle between armies of the Kingdom of Italy and Austria-Hungary

- Part of Italian Front during the First World War
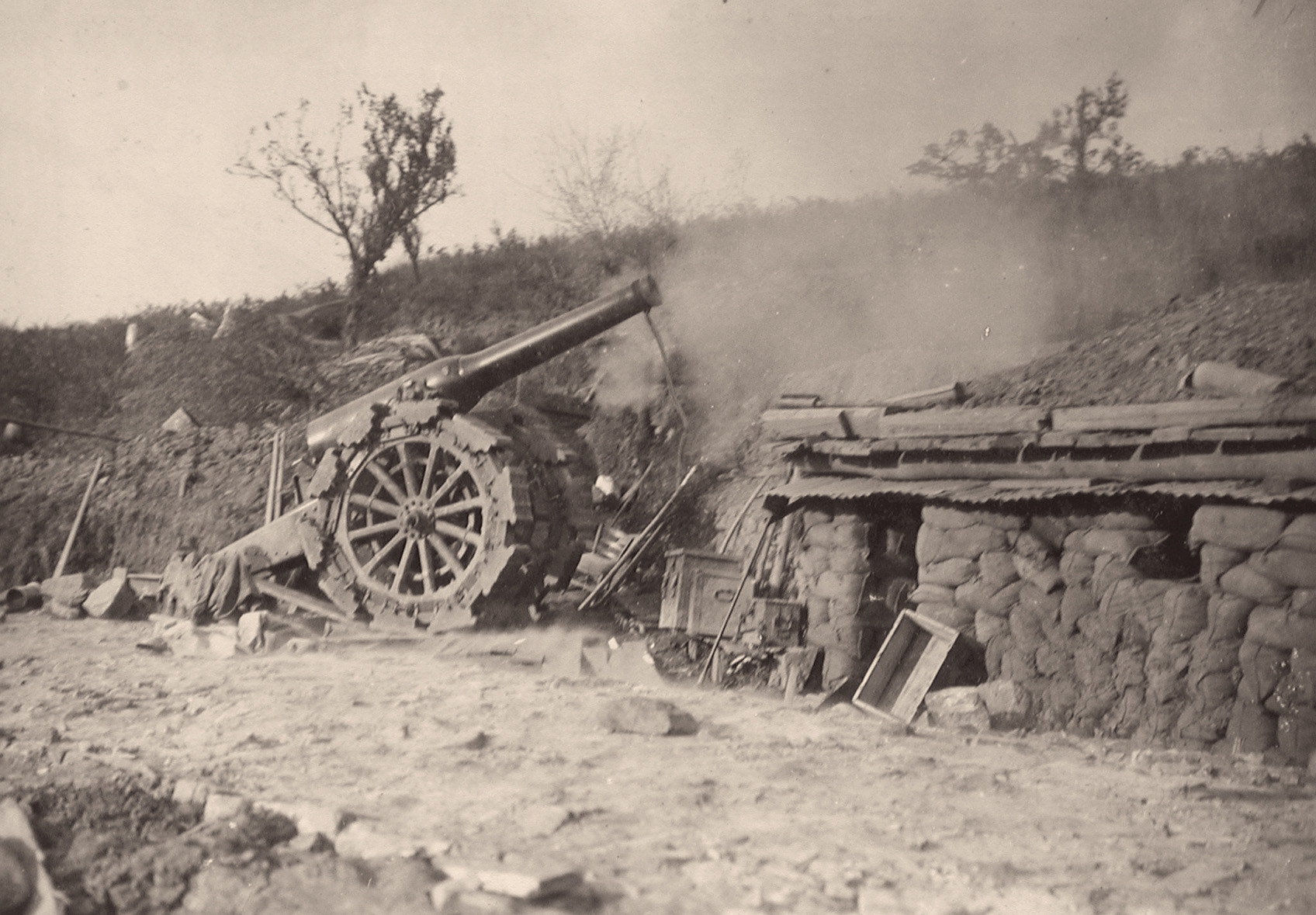
- Italian artillery firing on Podgora
Date	19 July 1915
Location	Podgora, Austria-Hungary
Result	Austro-Hungarian victory

Belligerents
Italy	Austria-Hungary

Commanders and leaders
(Kingdom of Italy) Luigi Cadorna (Kingdom of Italy) Emanuele Filiberto (Kingdom of Italy) Luigi Capello	(Austria-Hungary) Conrad von Hötzendorf (Austria-Hungary) Svetozar Boroević von Bojna (Austria-Hungary) Archduke Eugen of Austria

Strength
1,600	400

Casualties and losses
53 dead 143 injured 11 missing	Heavy

The Battle of Podgora was a battle between Italian and Austro-Hungarian forces during World War I on the Isonzo front.

Podgora, also known as Monte Calvario in Italian and Kalvarija in Slovenian, was a key defensive position for the Austro-Hungarian forces during the early battles of the Isonzo, protecting the strategic city of Gorizia. Heavily fortified with trenches, barbed wire, and machine-gun posts, it was supported by artillery on the peaks.

On 19 June 1915, Italian forces launched an attack, initially targeting the Austro-Hungarian trenches with artillery fire. Despite intense resistance and heavy casualties, the Italian Bersaglieri managed to advance but were ultimately halted. Subsequent reinforcements failed to secure further gains, and heavy losses led to the cessation of the attack. The battle ended with significant casualties for the Italians, who eventually captured Podgora during the Sixth Battle of the Isonzo, leading to the conquest of Gorizia on 6 August 1916.

== Background ==
Podgora, also known as Monte Calvario in Italian and Kalvarija in Slovenian, was one of the main bulwarks of the Austro-Hungarian defense of the strategically important city of Gorizia during the early battles of the Isonzo. It was heavily fortified with multiple lines of trenches, barbed wire and machine-gun posts. Further protection was provided by the Austro-Hungarian artillery positioned on the peaks.

== The Battle ==
On 19 June 1915 at 10:20am the attack began with the 75 mm battery hitting the Austro-Hungarian trenches on the left where the machine guns were located. At 11:00am, the 8th Company, under the command of Captain Vallaro, jumped from the trench, followed 30 meters by Lieutenant Losco's 7th and, another 30 metres, by Captain Lazari's 9th. The Carabinieri immediately came under intense Austro-Hungarian fire which slowed down until it halted the advance of the 7th Company, which was soon left without its commander, who was mortally wounded (Lieutenant Losco would be remembered as the first Carabinieri officer to die in battle during the first world War). Some elements of the 8th Company managed to overtake their comrades from the 7th, settling close to the enemy fences. The 9th Company managed to advance to where the 7th and 8th had already been stopped despite suffering heavy casualties which including their commanding officer Captain Lazari who was seriously wounded. Once the survivors had reorganised, a new bayonet attack was launched which brought the Carabinieri a few meters from the enemy fences, in a fold of ground. But the action was costly and the position proved to be very precarious, so much so that after a few minutes, among others, lieutenant colonel Pranzetti and lieutenants Parziale and Struffi were wounded. The heavy losses prevented the 3rd Battalion from continuing the action so at 13:00 the 4th and 5th companies of the 2nd Battalion went into action. The intense enemy fire, however, allowed only a few elements to reunite with the survivors of the 3rd Battalion: among the first wounded were lieutenants De Dominicis and Ciuffoletti. The 2nd battalion of the 36th Infantry Regiment also intervened in support, but was unable to advance. Meanwhile, on the left, the Austro-Hungarians had repelled an attack by the 1st Infantry Regiment, and managed to gain a favorable position to strike the Carabinieri from behind.

Given the deteriorating situation, the Carabinieri were ordered to settle as best they could on the positions they had captured at such a high cost and prepare to defend against a possible Austro-Hungarian counterattack. It was also planned to renew the attack with the support of the 2nd battalion of the 36th Infantry Regiment. However, a few minutes before the appointed time the order was revoked by the command of the VI Army Corps because, in consideration of the losses already suffered, it was deemed necessary to prepare for the new attack with more effective artillery fire.

== Aftermath ==
At a height of 240m at 18:00, the wounded were cleared away. Taking advantage of the darkness of the night, some volunteer Carabinieri took care of the recovery and burial of the fallen. The day ended with 53 dead, 143 wounded and 11 missing. Podgora would later be captured by the infantry of the Casale brigade (11th and 12th Infantry Regiment) during the Sixth Battle of the Isonzo, which would lead to the conquest of Gorizia on 6 August 1916.
