= Gaston Médécin =

Monegasque athlete (1901–1983)

Personal information
- Nationality: Monegasque
- Born: 8 January 1901
- Died: 8 March 1983 (aged 82)

Sport
- Sport: Athletics
- Events: Long jump Decathlon

Gaston Médécin (8 January 1901 – 8 March 1983) was a Monegasque athlete. He competed at the 1924 Summer Olympics and the 1928 Summer Olympics. The Salle Gaston Médecin, an indoor sports arena in Fontvieille, Monaco, is named after him.
