= Sasaki (surname) =

Sasaki (佐々木) is the 13th most common Japanese surname. Less common variants are 佐咲, 佐佐木 and 笹木.

== Notable people with the surname ==
- Akio Sasaki (佐々木 彰生; born 1991), Japanese figure skater
- Akira Sasaki (佐々木 明; born 1981), Japanese alpine skier
- Ayaka Sasaki (佐々木 彩夏; born 1996), Japanese idol and singer
- Ayumu Sasaki (佐々木 歩夢; born 2000), Japanese motorcycle racer
- Chihaya Sasaki (佐々木 千隼; born 1994), Japanese baseball player
- Daichi Sasaki (佐々木 大地; born 1995), Japanese shogi player
- Daiju Sasaki (佐々木 大樹; born 1999), Japanese footballer
- Daiki Sasaki (佐々木 大樹; born 1991), Japanese race car driver
- Daisuke Sasaki (佐々木 大輔; born 1985), Japanese professional wrestler
- Daizo Sasaki (born 1990), Japanese kickboxer
- Eiji Sasaki (佐々木 英治; 1915–2007), Japanese businessman
- Eri Sasaki (佐々木 恵梨; born 1989), Japanese musician
- Sasaki Gensō (佐々木 玄宗; born 1947), Japanese Zen Buddhist
- Hankyu Sasaki (佐々木 半九; 1896–1971), Imperial Japanese Navy admiral
- Haruno Sasaki (佐々木 春乃; born 1995), Japanese handball player
- Hayato Sasaki (佐々木 勇人; born 1982), Japanese footballer
- Hideo Sasaki (1919–2000), American landscape architect
- Sasaki Hideyoshi (佐々木 秀義; 1112–1184), Japanese samurai
- Hiro Sasaki, Japanese professional wrestler
- Hirohisa Sasaki (佐々木 浩久; born 1961), Japanese film director and screenwriter
- Hirokazu Sasaki (佐々木 博和; born 1962), Japanese footballer and manager
- Hiroki Sasaki (佐々木 宏樹; born 1993), Japanese footballer
- Hiroko Sasaki, Japanese pianist
- Hiroyuki Sasaki (佐々木 裕之; born 1956), Japanese geneticist
- Hisayuki Sasaki (佐々木 久行; 1964–2013), Japanese golfer
- Hitoshi Sasaki (footballer, born 1891) (佐々木 等; 1891–1982), Japanese footballer and manager
- Ikki Sasaki (佐々木 一輝; born 1991), Japanese footballer
- Isao Sasaki (佐々木 功; born 1942), Japanese voice actor, actor and singer
- Jiro Sasaki (佐々木 二郎; born 1956), Japanese swimmer
- Joh Sasaki (佐々木 譲; born 1950), Japanese writer and journalist
- Jun Sasaki (佐々木 潤; born 1966), Japanese singer-songwriter and journalist
- Kaori Sasaki (佐々木 香織; born 1971), Japanese swimmer
- Katsuhiko Sasaki (佐々木 勝彦; born 1944), Japanese actor and voice actor
- Kazuaki Sasaki (佐々木 一昭; born 1967), Japanese cyclist
- Kazuhiro Sasaki (佐々木 主浩; born 1968), Japanese baseball player
- Kazumasa Sasaki (佐々木 一正; born 1989), Japanese ice hockey player
- Kazunari Sasaki (佐々木 一成; born 1962), Japanese cross-country skier
- Kenichi Sasaki (佐々木 健一; born 1950), Japanese handball player
- Kensho Sasaki (佐々木 憲昭; born 1945), Japanese politician
- Kensuke Sasaki (佐々木 健介; born 1966), Japanese professional wrestler
- Kichizo Sasaki (佐々木 吉蔵; 1912–1983), Japanese sprinter
- Kizen Sasaki (佐々木 喜善; 1886–1933), Japanese folklorist
- Koji Sasaki (佐々木 康治; born 1936), Japanese footballer
- Sasaki Kojirō (佐々木 小次郎; c. 1585 – 1612), Japanese swordsman
- Kokone Sasaki (佐々木 心音; born 1990), Japanese actress, singer-songwriter, television personality and gravure idol
- Kon Sasaki (佐々木 崑; 1918–2009), Japanese photographer
- Kota Sasaki (佐々木 孝太; born 1974), Japanese racing driver
- Kōrō Sasaki (佐々木 耕郎; 1895–1978), Japanese politician
- Kōzō Sasaki (佐々木 更三; 1900–1985), Japanese politician
- Kumi Sasaki (idol) (佐々木 久美; born 1996), Japanese idol
- Kuranosuke Sasaki (佐々木 蔵之介; born 1968), Japanese actor
- Kyozan Joshu Sasaki (1907–2014), Japanese Zen Buddhist
- Lisa Sasaki (born 1975), American museum director
- Madoka Sasaki (佐々木 望; 1883-1927), Japanese zoologist
- Maki Sasaki (佐々木 マキ; born 1946), Japanese manga artist
- Makoto Sasaki (baseball) (佐々木 誠; born 1965), Japanese baseball player
- Makoto Sasaki (shogi) (佐々木 慎; born 1980), Japanese shogi player
- Mamoru Sasaki (佐々木 守; 1936-2006), Japanese screenwriter
- Mana Sasaki (佐々木真菜, Sasaki Mana; born 1997), Japanese para-athlete
- Masanao Sasaki (佐々木 雅尚; born 1962), Japanese footballer
- Mayu Sasaki (佐々木 繭; born 1993), Japanese women's footballer
- Megumi Sasaki (佐々木 芽生; born 1962), Japanese filmmaker and writer
- Miki Sasaki (佐々木 みき; born 1976), Japanese volleyball player
- Mikio Sasaki (佐々木 幹夫; born 1937), Japanese chief executive
- Mikirō Sasaki (佐々木 幹郎; born 1947), Japanese poet and writer
- Mikoi Sasaki (佐々木 未来; born 1991), Japanese voice actress and singer
- Minoru Sasaki (佐佐木 登; 1893–1961), Japanese general
- Mirei Sasaki (佐々木 美玲, born 1999), Japanese idol and model
- Mitsuzo Sasaki (佐々木 味津三; 1896–1934), Japanese writer
- Motoko Sasaki (佐々木 基子; born 1967), Japanese actress and striptease performer
- Mutsumi Sasaki (ささき むつみ), Japanese illustrator
- Nanae Sasaki (佐々木 七恵; 1956–2009), Japanese long-distance runner
- Sasaki Nariyori (佐々木 成頼; 976–1003), Japanese daimyō
- Nobuo Sasaki (佐々木 信男; born 1956), Japanese handball player
- Nobutsuna Sasaki (佐佐木 信綱; 1872–1963), Japanese poet and literature academic
- Noriko Sasaki (佐々木 倫子; born 1961), Japanese manga artist
- Norio Sasaki (佐々木 則夫; born 1958), Japanese footballer and manager
- Nozomi Sasaki (model) (佐々木 希; born 1988), Japanese model
- Nozomi Sasaki (voice actress) (ささき のぞみ; born 1983), Japanese voice actress
- Nozomu Sasaki (佐々木 望; born 1967), Japanese voice actor
- Paul Shinji Sasaki (パウロ 佐々木 鎮次; 1885–1946), Japanese Anglican bishop
- Ray Sasaki (born 1948), American trumpeter
- Rie Sasaki (佐々木 理江; born 24 August 1982), Japanese politician
- Rintaro Sasaki (born 2005), Japanese baseball player
- Rio Sasaki (佐々木 りお; born 2002), Japanese actress
- Rōki Sasaki (佐々木 朗希; born 2001), Japanese baseball player
- Sasaki Rui (佐々木 累), Japanese swordswoman
- Rui Sasaki (born 1984), glass artist from Japan
- Run Sasaki (佐々木 るん; born 1956), Japanese voice actress
- Ruth Fuller Sasaki (1892–1967), American Zen Buddhist
- Ryo Sasaki (佐々木 亮), Japanese manga artist and illustrator
- Ryosuke Sasaki (佐々木 亮輔; born 1993), Japanese handball player
- Ryuta Sasaki (佐々木 竜太; born 1988), Japanese footballer
- Ryuzo Sasaki (笹木 竜三; 1956–2022), Japanese politician
- Sadako Sasaki (佐々木 禎子; 1943–1955), child victim of the atomic bombing of Hiroshima
- Satoru Sasaki (佐々木 悟; born 1985), Japanese long-distance runner
- Sayaka Sasaki (佐咲 紗花; born 1982), Japanese musician
- Seiichiro Sasaki (佐々木 精一郎; born 1945), Japanese long-distance runner
- Seiji Sasaki (佐々木 誠二; born 1965), Japanese voice actor
- Sérgio Sasaki (born 1992), Brazilian artistic gymnast
- Setsuko Sasaki (佐々木 節子; born 1944), Japanese volleyball player
- Shigeo Sasaki (佐々木 重夫; 1912–1987), Japanese mathematician
- Shigetaka Sasaki, Canadian judoka
- Shirō Sasaki (佐々木 史朗; born 1939), Japanese film producer
- Sho Sasaki (佐々木 翔; born 1982), Japanese badminton player
- Sho Sasaki (footballer) (佐々木 翔; born 1989), Japanese footballer
- Shōichirō Sasaki (佐々木昭一郎; 1936–2024), Japanese filmmaker
- Shota Sasaki (佐々木 将汰; born 1993), Japanese slalom canoeist
- Shozo Sasaki (佐々木 昭三; born 1944), Japanese biathlete
- Shu Sasaki (佐佐木 周; born 1991), Japanese footballer
- Sokei-an Sasaki Shigetsu (曹渓庵 佐々木 指月; 1882–1945), Japanese Zen Buddhist
- Sueaki Sasaki (佐々木 末昭; born 1942), Japanese swimmer
- Tadahiro Sasaki (佐々木 忠広; born 1970), Japanese boxer
- Tadashi Sasaki (banker) (佐々木 直; 1907–1988), Japanese banker
- Tadashi Sasaki (engineer) (佐々木 正; 1915–2018), Japanese engineer
- Tadashi Sasaki (musician), Japanese classical guitarist
- Takahiro Sasaki (politician) (佐々木 隆博; born 1949), Japanese politician
- Takaoki Sasaki (佐々木 隆興; 1878–1966), Japanese biochemist and oncologist
- Sasaki Takatsuna (佐々木 高綱; 1160–1214), Japanese samurai
- Sasaki Takauji (佐々木 高氏; 1306–1373), Japanese samurai
- Sasaki Takayuki (佐々木 高行; 1830–1910), Japanese politician
- Takumi Sasaki (佐々木 匠; born 1998), Japanese footballer
- Tatsuo Sasaki (musician) (佐々木 達夫; born 1944), Japanese musician
- Tatsuo Sasaki (wrestler) (佐々木 竜雄; born 1942), Japanese sport wrestler
- Terufumi Sasaki (佐々木 輝文), Japanese surgeon
- Sasaki Tōichi (佐々木 到一; 1886–1995), Japanese soldier
- Sasaki Tomiaki (佐々木 富明; 1746 – after 1827), Japanese sculptor
- Tomio Sasaki (佐々木 富雄; born 1945), Japanese alpine skier
- Tomoko Sasaki (佐々木 知子; born 1955), Japanese lawyer, politician and writer
- Tomoyuki Sasaki (佐々木 共之; born 1963), Japanese sailor
- Toshinao Sasaki (佐々木 俊尚; born 1961), Japanese journalist
- Toshiro Sasaki (佐左木 俊郎; 1900–1933), Japanese writer
- Tsubasa Sasaki (born 1995), Japanese slalom canoeist
- Umeji Sasaki (佐々木 梅治; born 1945), Japanese actor and voice actor
- Wataru Sasaki (佐々木 渉; born 1996), Japanese footballer
- Yasuji Sasaki (born 1967), Japanese chef
- Yasushi Sasaki (佐々木 康; 1908–1993), Japanese film director
- Yoji Sasaki (佐々木 陽次; born 1992), Japanese footballer
- Yōko Sasaki (佐々木 瑶子; born 1975), Japanese voice actress and actress
- Yoshihide Sasaki (佐々木 喜英; born 1987), Japanese actor
- Yoshinori Sasaki (佐々木 嘉則; born 1974), Japanese professional wrestler known as Mammoth Sasaki
- Sasaki Yoshikiyo (佐々木 義清; 1161–1242), Japanese samurai
- Yūka Sasaki (佐々木 優香; born 1987), Japanese ten-pin bowler
- Yuki Sasaki (mixed martial artist) (佐々木 有生; born 1976), Japanese mixed martial artist
- Yūki Sasaki (shogi) (佐々木 勇気; born 1994), Japanese shogi player
- Yūko Sasaki (佐々木 優子; born 1982), Japanese cricketer
- Yuta Sasaki (佐々木 佑太; born 1989), better known as Ulka Sasaki, Japanese mixed martial artist

== Fictional characters ==
- Sasaki (Haruhi Suzumiya) (佐々木), a character in the light novel series The Melancholy of Haruhi Suzumiya
- Chizuru Sasaki (千鶴), acharacter in manga series Haikyū!!, the position is Wing Spiker
- Haise Sasaki (佐々木 琲世), an alias of Ken Kaneki, protagonist of the manga series Tokyo Ghoul
- Johnny Sasaki (ジョニー 佐々木), a character in the video game Metal Gear Solid
- "Overflowing" Sasaki, an antagonistic character of the manga series One Piece
- Isaburou Sasaki (佐々木 異三郎), a character in the manga series GinTama
- Sasaki Hina, a Japanese racer from Bang Bang Racing and Yandere Simulator OC character
- Kiiko Sasaki (佐々木 妃子), a character in the manga series Laughing Under the Clouds
- Makie Sasaki (佐々木 まき絵), a character in the manga series Negima
- Mirai Sasaki (佐々木未来), a character in the manga series My Hero Academia
- Rika Sasaki (佐々木 利佳), a character in the manga series Cardcaptor Sakura
- Sasaki Ryujiro (佐々木 龍), a character in the anime series Samurai Champloo
- Tsuyoshi Sasaki (佐々木 剛), a character in the manga series Kodomo no Omocha
- Miyo Sasaki (佐々木美代), a character in the movie A Whisker Away
- Marurin Sasaki (ささき まるりん), one of the students in Challenge Kindergarten in the Shima Shima Tora no Shimajirou series.
- Maguro Sasaki (佐々木まぐろ), a character in the video game series Puyo Puyo
- Sasaki Shuumei (佐々木 秀鳴), one of the two main characters in the manga series Sasaki and Miyano
- Sasaki Hitomi (佐々木 仁美), one of the sixteen characters in the video project, Tetro Danganronpa: Pink.

== See also ==
- Sasaki clan, a samurai clan
