= Athletics at the 1917 Far Eastern Championship Games =

III Far Eastern Championship Games
- Dates: May 1917
- Host city: Tokyo, Japan
- Events: 18
- Participation: 3 nations

At the 1917 Far Eastern Championship Games, the athletics events were held in Tokyo, Japan in May. A total of eighteen events were contested in the men-only competition. The javelin throw was contested for the first time and a ten mile run was included for the first and only time as the sole long-distance running event (replacing the 8-mile race held in 1915). Japan won most of the individual track medals, while China and the Philippines were the most successful in the field events section.

Fortunato Catalon of the Philippines completed a sprint double in the 100-yard and 220-yard runs. Japan's Gishiro Taku completed a similar feat in the middle-distance running events. Filipino long jumper C. Cardenas was the only individual to retain their title from the 1915 Shanghai Championship Games. The decathlon winner Genzaburo Noguchi of Japan went on to become the first person to represent his country in the event at the 1920 Summer Olympics.

== Medal summary ==
=== Men ===
Event	Gold		Silver		Bronze	
100 yards	Fortunato Catalon (PHI)	10.0	Nicolas Llaneta (PHI)	10.4	Sasago Madono (JPN)	10.4
220 yards straight	Fortunato Catalon (PHI)	23.8	Sasago Madono (JPN)	24.2	Joji Hattori (JPN)	24.6
440 yards	Shinsaku Yamanouchi (JPN)	55.0	Iwao Saeki (JPN)	55.2	Pedro Ablan (PHI)	56.2
880 yards	Gishiro Taku (JPN)	2:12.2	Shinsaku Yamanouchi (JPN)	2:14.0	Ichiro Sawada (JPN)	2:15.0
One mile	Gishiro Taku (JPN)	4:56.4	Kenkichi Inoue (JPN)	4:59.4	Tadanao Suzuki (JPN)	5:04.0
Ten miles	Genichi Hashimoro (JPN)	???	Tominosuke Kato (JPN)	???	Hitoshi Sasaki (JPN)	???
120 yd hurdles	Constantino Rabaya (PHI)	17.0	Chang Chingfu (CHN)	???	Jose Lozada (PHI)	???
220 yd hurdles straight	Isabelo Astraquillo (PHI)	28.6	Calixto Bello (PHI)	28.8	Sapnu (PHI)	29.0
4×220 yd relay	Philippines (PHI)	1:38.2	Japan (JPN)	1:39.2	China (CHN)	???
4×400 yd relay	Japan (JPN)	3:41.0	Philippines (PHI)	3:42.0	China (CHN)	???
High jump	Yuan Qingxiang (CHN)	1.67 m	Kuo Chiaoyen (CHN)	1.65 m	Chen Wuten (CHN)	1.62 m
Pole vault	Tang Ichung (CHN)	3.15 m	Kuo Chiaoyen (CHN)	3.07 m	Llanes (PHI)	2.99 m
Long jump	C. Cardenas (PHI)	6.63 m	Genaro Saavedra (PHI)	6.55 m	Simon Santos (PHI)	6.48 m
Shot put	Alejo Alvarez (PHI)	10.69 m	Cabanilla (PHI)	10.44 m	Mun Chipan (CHN)	10.29 m
Discus throw	Rafael Montes (PHI)	33.36 m	Alejo Alvarez (PHI)	31.10 m	Liu Inwu (CHN)	29.54 m
Javelin throw	Kenkichi Saito (JPN)	43.74 m	C. Cardenas (PHI)	38.54 m	Chen Chuju (CHN)	37.68 m
Pentathlon	Masajiro Sagiyama (JPN)	295 pts	Tu Jungtang (CHN)	287 pts	Chu Wuto (CHN)	252 pts
Decathlon	Genzaburo Noguchi (JPN)	678 pts	Wenceslao Villanueva (PHI)	??? pts	Genaro Saavedra (PHI)	??? pts
