= Ricardo Rada Peral =

Spanish officer

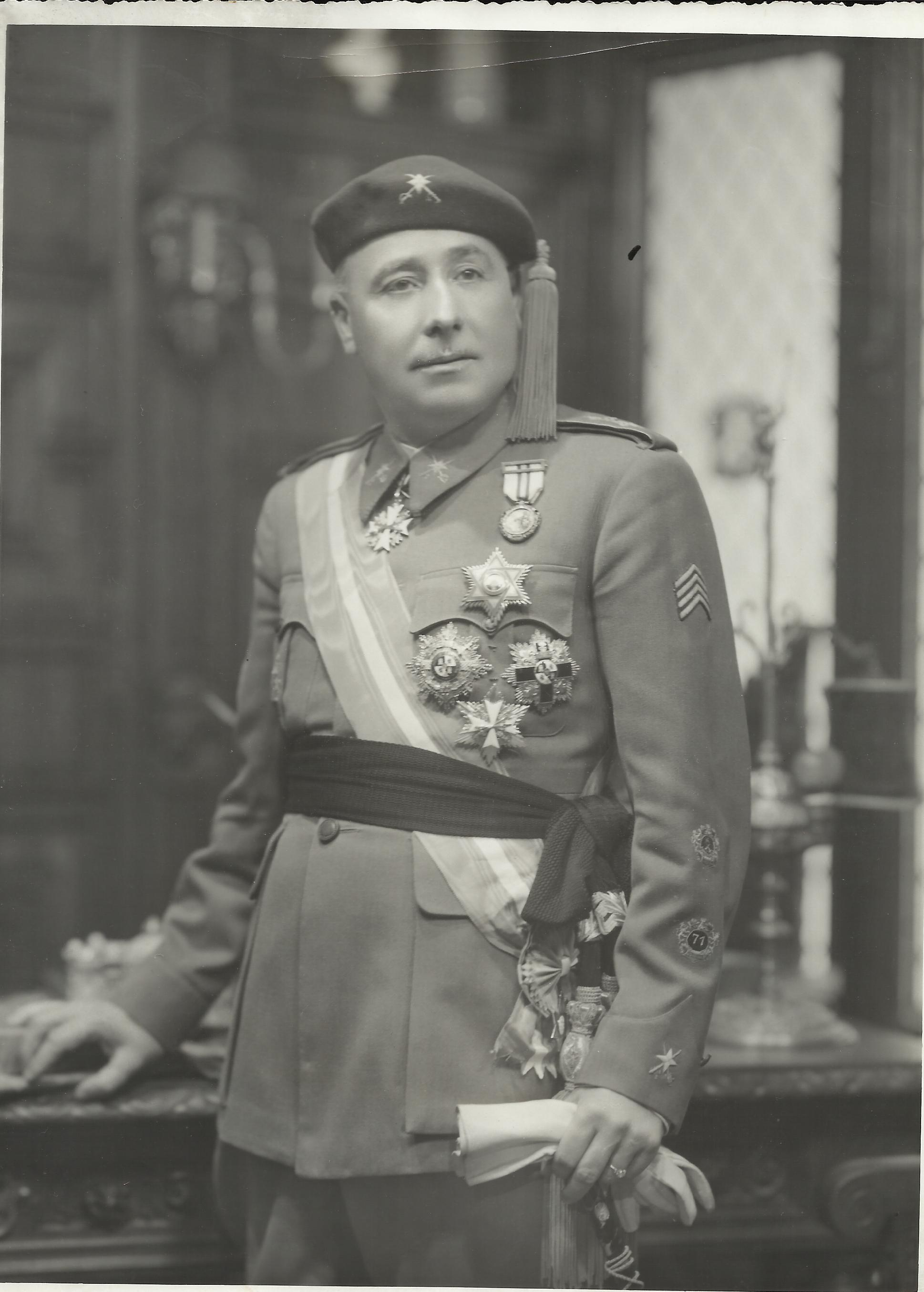
- Born: 5 February 1885; Málaga, Spain
- Died: 8 June 1956 (aged 81); Madrid, Spain
- Occupation: professional officer
- Known for: military
- Political party: Falange, Carlism

Ricardo Rada Peral (5 February 1885 – 8 June 1956) was a Spanish officer, who rose to the rank of lieutenant general. In the 1910s and 1920s he spent 12 years in Morocco, both on combat missions and garrison service; during the Spanish Civil War he sided with the Nationalists and commanded units up to a corps. In the 1940s he was the first commander of the first Spanish armored division. His highest army assignment was command of the II. Military Region (Seville) in 1946-1952. He is best known as instructor and de facto leader of paramilitary militias of the Falangists (Primera Línea) in 1933-1934 and the Carlists (Requeté) in 1935-1936. Until the 1930s he did not engage in politics; later following a brief period in Falange Española he joined Comunión Tradicionalista and entered the top Carlist wartime executive. In the late 1930s he fully identified with the Francoist regime and abandoned other party activity.

== Family and youth ==
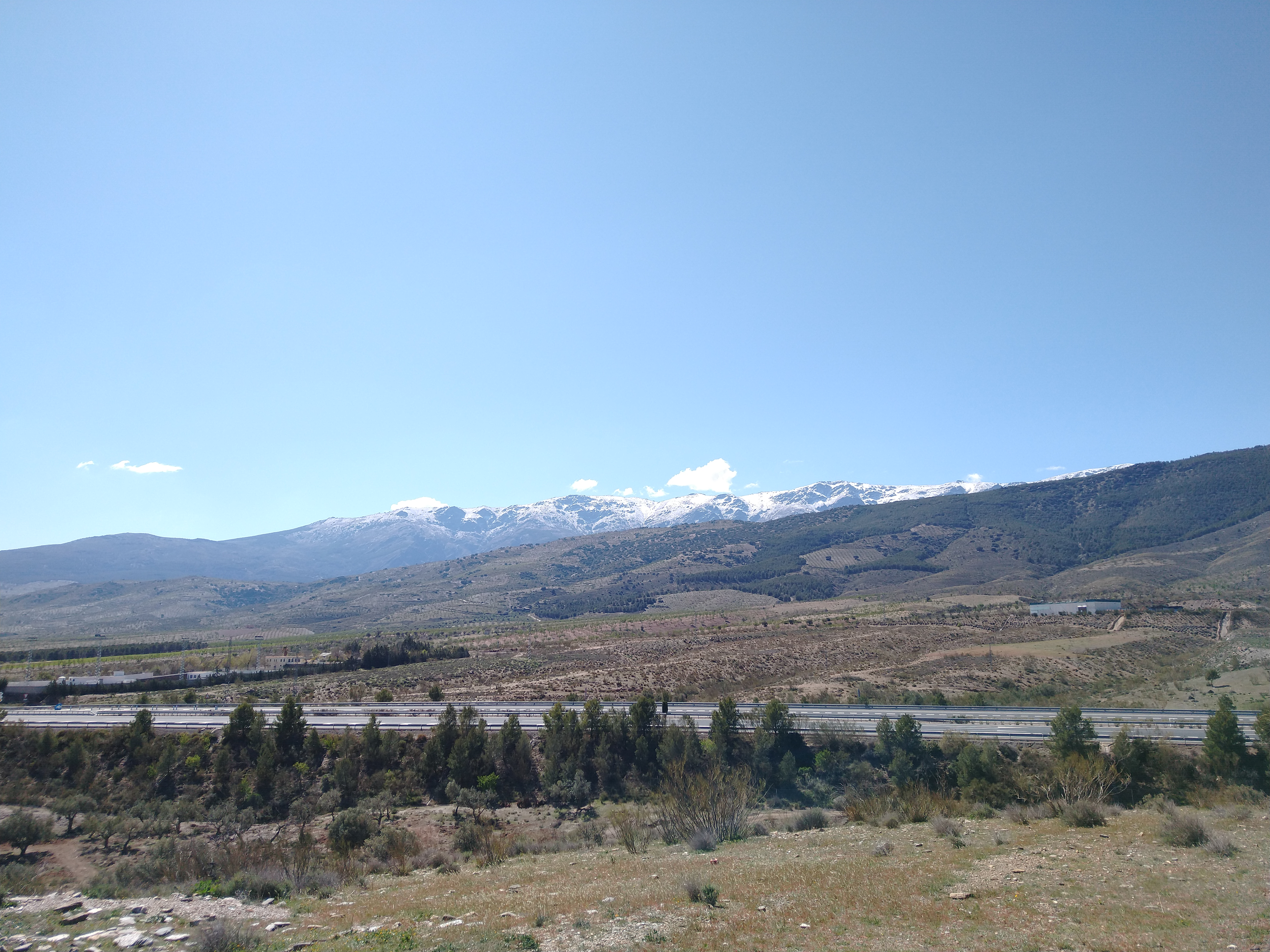
Fiñana landscape

Rada descended from an Andalusian family of military traditions. His paternal grandfather, Ricardo Rada Martínez from Granada (died 1900) served in Guardia Civil. He fought during the Hispano-Moroccan war and during the Third Carlist War in the Alfonsist ranks; he received military honors for his contribution to defense of Bilbao and other campaigns. Since the late 1870s he held numerous high Guardia Civil positions in Andalusia and retired as a highly decorated coronel subinspector of the Benemérita. At unspecified time he married Nicolasa Cortines Espinosa de los Monteros; they had 5 children. One of them was the father of Ricardo, most likely the oldest of the siblings, Ricardo Rada Cortines (1858-1923). He also joined Guardia Civil, but later moved to infantry; in 1888 he served as teniente, in 1903 he was comandante, in 1911 he rose to teniente coronel, and he retired as general de brigada. He married Natalia Peral Obispo (1861-1946), daughter to a landholder family from Guadix; she later inherited real estate in Fiñana and Abla.

The couple had 9 children, Ricardo born as the second oldest and the first son. There is close to nothing known about his childhood, probably spent in the maternal estates; in the late 1890s he was already a boarder at the Instituto Provincional in Almeria. Relatively late at the age of 21 he commenced the military career; in 1906 Rada entered the infantry academy in Toledo. He progressed in line with the standard curriculum and graduated in 1909; he was nominated to the lowest officer rank, segundo teniente. His first assignment was to Badajoz, where in 1909 he commenced regular garrison duties.

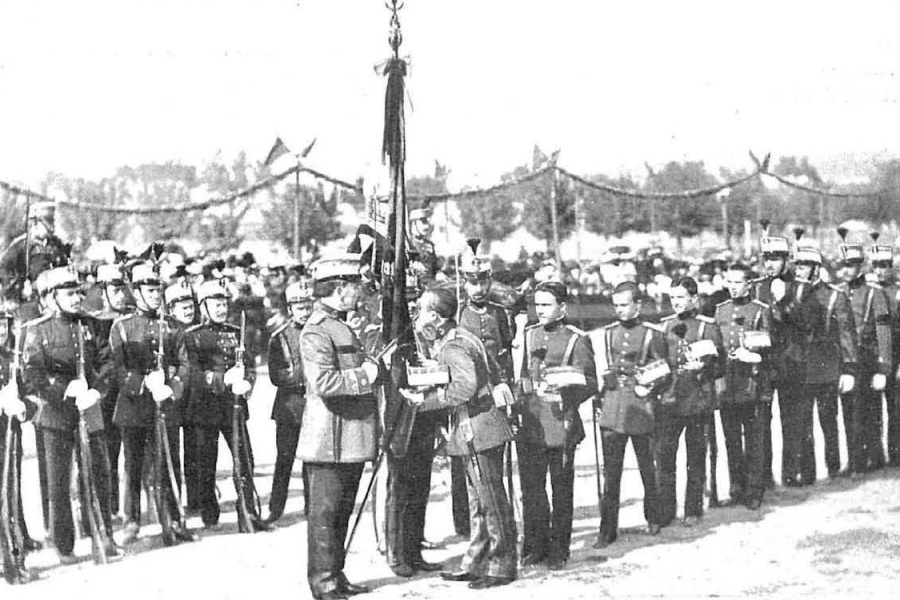
Toledo cadets taking oath, 1910s

In 1911 Rada married Presentación Martínez Martínez; her father Juan Manuel Martínez Alcalde was the landowner from Huéneja. Ricardo and Presentación had 5 children, born between the early 1910s and the early 1920s. Ricardo and Francisco Rada Martínez joined the army and served in Nationalist troops during the civil war; the former later specialized as engineer and in the early 1970s he was subdirector general de Montes de España, the latter became a military and then a civilian doctor. Juan was a lawyer and Manuel an official. María died in 1921 at 3 years of age. Among other Rada’s relatives, his brothers José and Rafael became officers; the former died in 1920, the latter in 1924 in Morocco. Two of his sisters also passed away prematurely, Rosario in 1899 and Dolores in 1920. The other four, Francisco, Eduardo, Ramón and Juana, did not become public figures. Some authors claim that Ricardo “was descendant” to a well-known Navarrese Carlist military Teodoro Rada Delgado (1822-1874), but data hardly match; it appears to be an ex-post attempt to enhance Rada’s links to Carlism.

== Junior officer ==
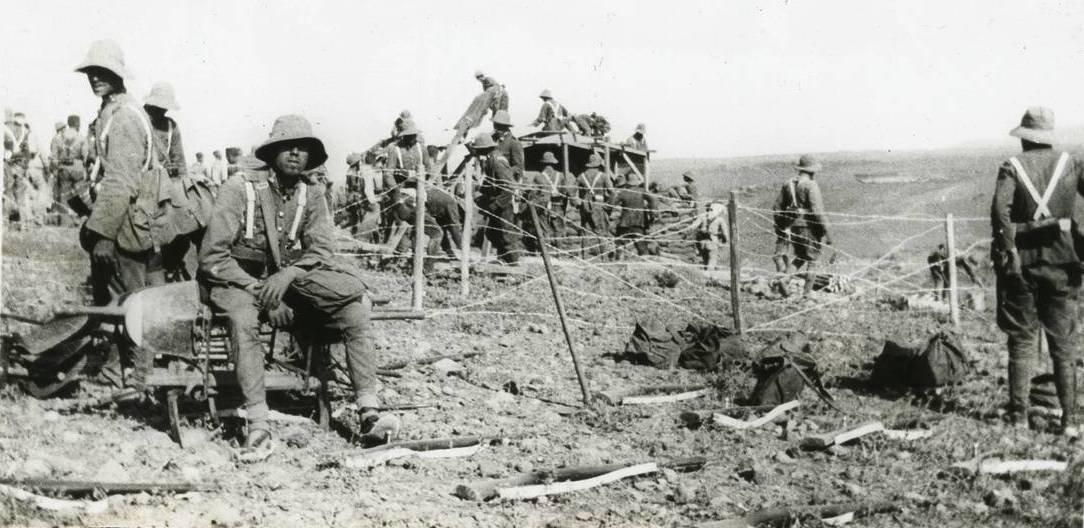
Spanish troops in Morocco

Rada served in Badajóz for some 2 years before in 1911 he was promoted to primer teniente de infantería. He apparently considered joining Guardia Civil, but in 1912 for unclear reasons he was removed from the list of candidates and posted to 10. Regimiento de Infantería de Córdoba. Following 1 more year of garrison service in 1913 he was posted to Morocco. His first spell lasted slightly over a year, between the summer of 1913 and the autumn of 1914; it fell on the war period known as Campaña de Yebala. Rada’s exact unit is not known. Initially shortly after arrival and due to illness he was hospitalized in Ceuta. He returned to line in early 1914, commencing a very intense spell of combat missions, first at Rincón de Medik at the outskirts of Tetuan and then during few other engagements in the hinterland, known as skirmishes at Malalien, Río Martín and Loma Amarilla. In September 1914 he was assigned to 5. Infantry Regiment del Infante in Zaragoza. In 1915 he received the first military honor, Cruz del Mérito Militar 1st class. In early 1916 Rada was promoted to capitán de infantería, though “por antigüedad” and not “por méritos de guerra”. The 1916 military annual lists him among officers of 2. Regiment da la Reina in Larache, but it is not clear whether he indeed returned to Africa. The same year he assumed duties in the 18. Regiment in Almería, where in 1917 he was decorated with Medalla Militar de Marruecos.

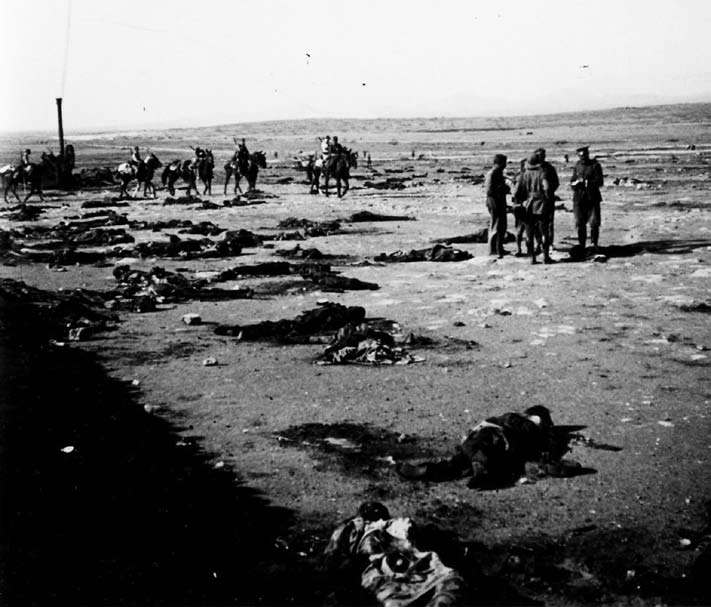
corpses of Spanish military after the Annual carnage

Rada served in Almería between 1918 and 1919. In 1920 he was back in Africa, listed as officer of the 2. Regimiento de Madrid, stationed in Ceuta. His second spell in Morocco lasted over 2 years, between 1921 and 1923. It is known that with an unspecified regiment he took part in the Battle of Annual in 1921; his unit survived the carnage and was sent to Melilla as reinforcements. In late 1921 he assumed command of 4. Compañía del Batallón Expedicionario of the 5. Infantry Regiment. On this position he took part in numerous combat actions; during one of them he was personally leading a bayonet charge. Some of the missions were defensive operations carried out as protection of own logistical lines, some were frontal assault engagements, and some were sieges of enemy strongholds; during different spells Rada served under command of Emilio Barrera, Federico Berenguer, José Sanjurjo and Miguel Campins. Following one more period in hospital and a brief period in 71. Regimiento de La Corona in Almeria in 1922, in 1922-1923 he kept serving on combat, policing and convoy protection missions with La Corona, mostly in eastern part of the protectorate. e.g. near Taza or Nador. Some included fierce and hardly successful battles, like the attempt to seize control over the area known as Zoco el Jemis de Beni-Bu-Ifrur. In 1922 his regiment received Medalla Militar Colectiva. In August 1923 Rada was promoted to comandante, this time for combat merits.

== Senior officer ==
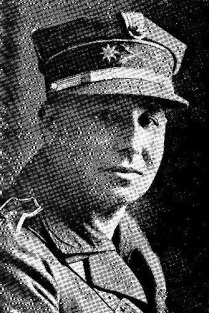
Rada in 1926

Following the coup of Primo de Rivera in 1923, the dictator dispatched military inspectors (delegados gubernativos) to reform local government and instill patriotism in the population; they were expected to root out the patronage networks of caciques and catalyze the emergence of new, prototypical Spanish citizen. In December 1923 Rada was nominated to such a role and assigned to the Almerían district of Vera; he kept building local primoriverista structures, like Somatén. One scholar claims that instead of fighting caciquismo, Rada sided with one of the local factions. In general, the concept of delegados gubernativos attracted increasing criticism; some claimed that it backfired by alienating local population and generating animosity towards the army. Since mid-1924 Primo started to withdraw his delegados; in 1924 Rada was recalled to Morocco.

The third Rada’s spell in Africa was the longest one and lasted almost 7 years, though out of these only 3 years were on combat missions. This time he was posted to the freshly formed Spanish foreign legion, known as Tercio de Extranjeros. His bandera saw action mostly in eastern Morocco, where Rada was noted by his superiors as “distinguiéndose siempre en cuantos momentos fue empleado, por su valor frío, rayano en el estoicismo, honrándose de haberlo tenido bajo su mando” and noted in the press. He was wounded and following treatment in the Almería hospital he returned to line, again wounded and this time treated in Tetuán until the spring of 1925. He then assumed command of 7. Bandera and then the 1. Bandera. In 1926 he took part in the Alhucemas landing; in 1925-1926, he either reported to or closely co-operated with Francisco Franco, Agustín Muñoz Grandes and Emilio Mola. Since 1927, Rada was commanding larger battle formations which included 2 banderas and auxiliary sub-units. At the time he was awarded Cruz de 2ª Clase del Mérito Militar, Cruz de 2ª Clase de María Cristina and Cruz de 2ª Clase del Mérito Naval.

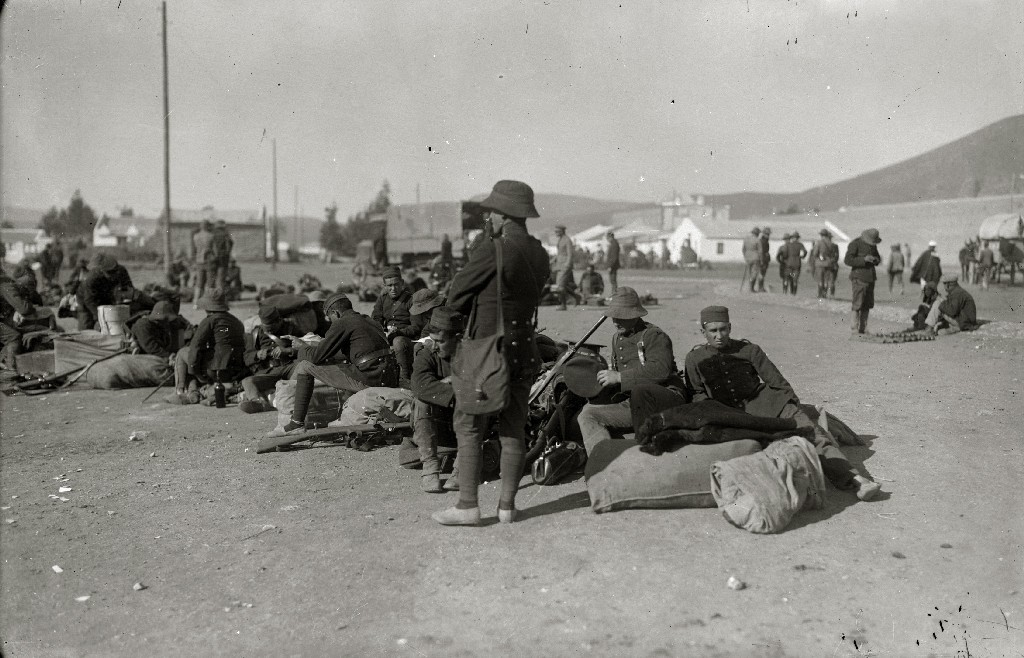
garrison service, Morocco

In 1927, the Spanish army suffocated the rising, and fighting in the protectorate ceased. Rada was given command of the Touima garrison near Nador, composed mostly of the 1. Tercio of the Legion. In 1928, he received the French Legion of Honour; the following year he was granted Medalla Militar Individual for his service in the mid-1920s. In 1929, he was already teniente coronel. Following the advent of the Republic in 1931, Rada initially received some minor further honors, but his situation changed when the government of Manuel Azaña embarked on major reform of the army. One of its objectives was to scale down what was perceived as an overgrown officer corps; the government deployed a scheme, partially forcing and partially encouraging officers to retire. It is not clear what mechanism worked for Rada; in June 1931, he passed from active service to reserve; the same year he left Morocco. As a 46-year-old pensioner, he settled in Almería; later he took up a job at Compañía Tabacalera.

== Early conspiracy ==
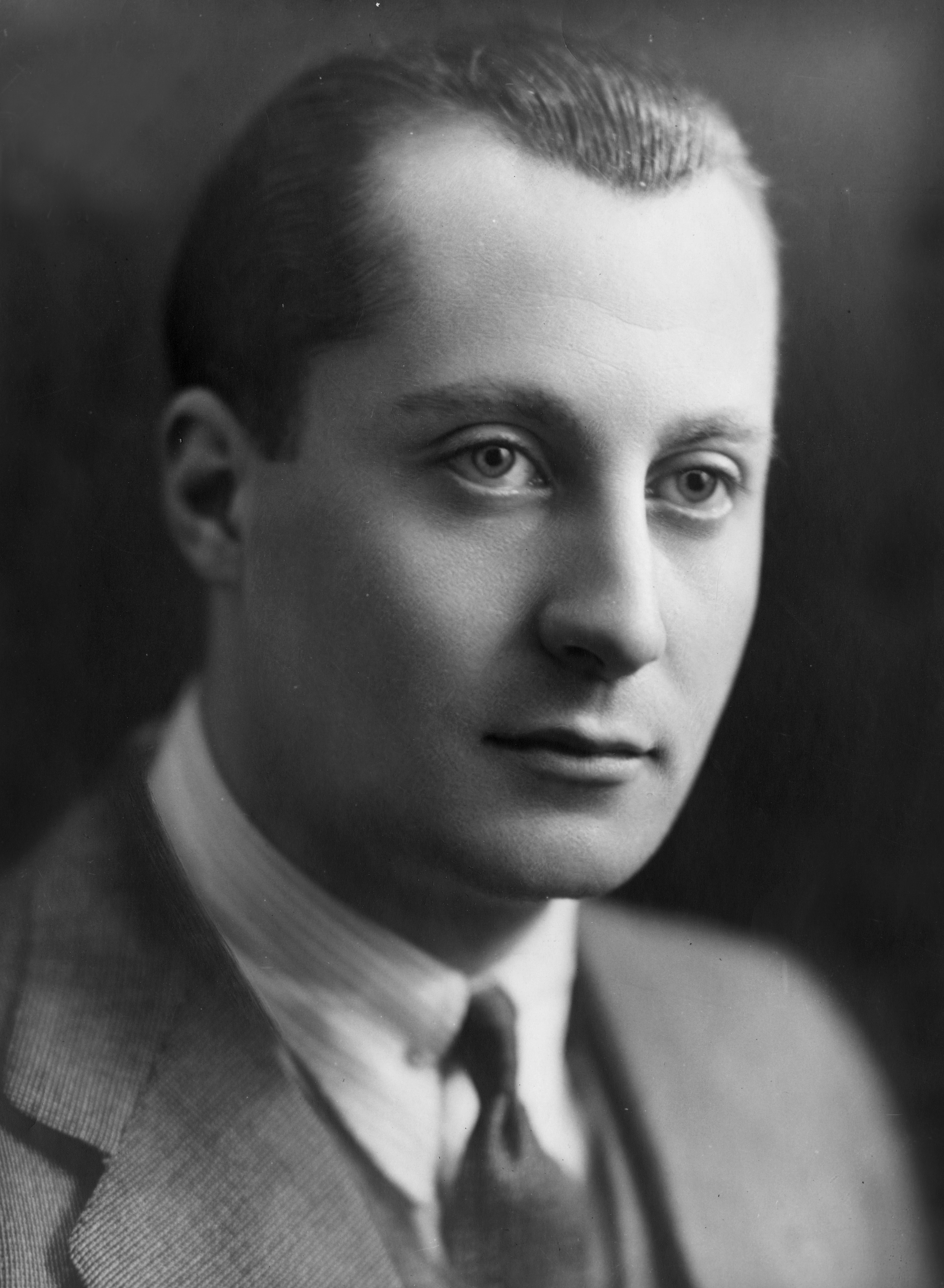
José Antonio

Data on Rada’s fate during the republican period is confusing and at times contradictory. The uncontested information is that politically he initially tended to sympathize with the local Almería branch of Acción Popular. However, during 1932-1933, he underwent rapid radicalization and since then scholars associate him with extreme right organisations. Few claim that already at this stage he joined the Carlists, but the prevailing opinion is that he rather opted for the nascent Falange Española. He either moved to Madrid or visited the capital frequently, and was often seen during meetings at the Ballena Alegre café, along the likes of Emilio Rodríguez Tarduchy or Luis López Pando. At least since 1934 on Falangist rallies, he appeared among top personalities, be it Jose Antonio Primo de Rivera or Raimundo Fernández-Cuesta. It is not clear what was his formal position within the party. According to some sources, it was so high that he greatly influenced appointments of jefes provinciales or even entire provincial executive bodies, at least in Andalusia.

At some point in 1933 or 1934, Rada got involved in buildup of the Falangist shirt branch; it was officially known as Primera Línea. According to some sources, he became the key man behind the organisation; others tend to agree, but note that formally and jointly with Román Ayza, he was one of two deputy commanders (“auxiliares”), while head of the branch was Luis Arredondo. At Primera Línea, Rada was instrumental when forming and training the Falangist militia, including teaching them “elementary facts about handling weapons”. However, over time some differences developed between Rada and other FE leaders. Some scholars consider him “more independent” and distinguish him from “staunch supporters”; others are more specific and list Rada among “monárquicos alfonsinos”; eventually in early 1935 this group – with Rada and Juan Antonio Ansaldo its best known representatives – resigned and left Falange.

Falangist standard

In late 1933, Rada engaged in other organisation, a semi-clandestine Unión Militar Española; its format was a hybrid between political pressure group and a corporative structure, sort of a trade union within the army. He was among 7 members of its Consejo Ejecutivo; some scholars list him, after Bartolomé Barba Hernández and along Rodríguez Tarduchy, Luis Arredondo Acuña and Gumersindo de la Gándara Morella the key man in the UME decision-making command layer. None of the sources consulted provides exact information on his contribution to the UME stand and its course towards the governmental policy. However, he is listed as a prominent person who in 1934-1936 labored to forge and then maintain contacts with political parties, apart from Falange also with the Alfonsists (Antonio Goicoechea, José Calvo Sotelo) and the Carlists (Manuel Fal Conde, José Luis Zamanillo). During final months of the Republic, Rada clearly advanced conspiracy against the regime, including violent action and potentially a coup.

== Carlist conspiracy ==
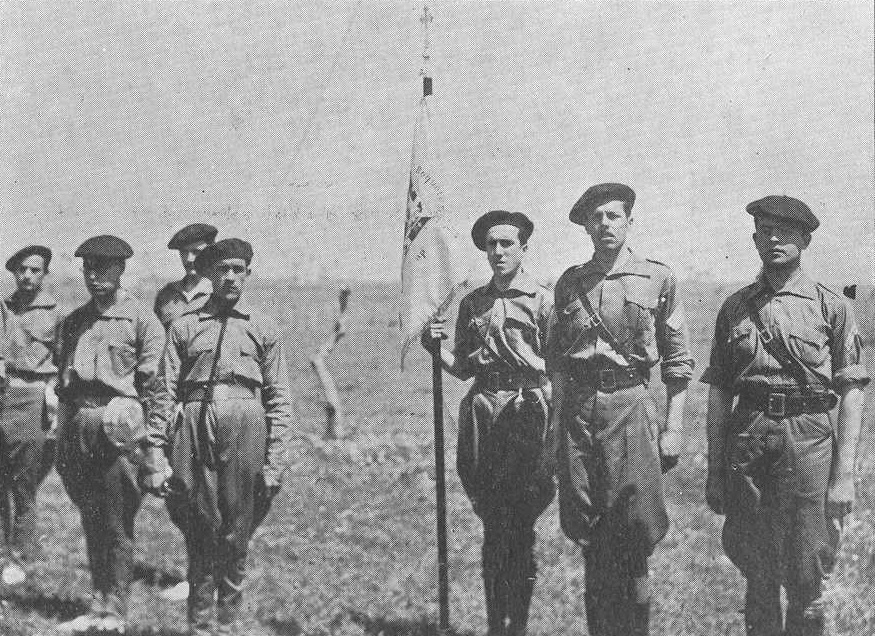
requeté drill, mid-1930s

Some scholars claim that Rada approached Carlism when he was still related to Falange or that he trained militias of both groupings simultaneously; one author even maintains that he was first working for the Carlists, then moved to FE and then returned to Comunión Tradicionalista. The dominating view, however, is that Rada joined the Traditionalists some time in early 1935. Like in Falange, his focus was on training the party militia, Requeté. According to some authors, the previous commander, Enrique Varela, returned to active military service and officially had to resign as Jefé Nacional; he continued as de facto commander, but formally his role was taken by Rada. Others claim he was Varela’s deputy, while most claim that Rada replaced Varela. He was assigned a title of Inspector General del Requeté. Rada proved vital for further Carlist military buildup; in late spring of 1936, Requeté grouped 10,000 fully armed and trained men plus 20,000 forming an auxiliary pool. In contrast to urban-oriented action groups "primarily accustomed to street fighting and pistolerismo", maintained by other parties, Requeté was a "genuine citizen army" capable of performing small-scale tactical military operations.

Since mid-1935, Rada was openly present at Carlist public gatherings, e.g. in Catalonia; the Republican security services tried to watch him closely. In general elections of February 1936, he stood as a Carlist candidate within the Candidatura Contrarrevolucionaria coalition in Almería, but failed. Afterwards, he fully dedicated himself to technical plans of a Requeté military action, though it is not clear whether as professional officer he indeed supported a ruritanian plan of Carlist-only rising, developed and prepared in May and June 1936. In the spring, he was appointed member of freshly-created Junta Técnica Militar, headed by Mario Muslera; the body was formed by professional officers, apart from Rada also by Alejandro Utrilla, Eduardo Baselga and José Sanjurjo, son of the exiled general. According to some, he headed so-called sección interna.

Carlist standard

Since June 1936, Rada was hectically active tying the knots of the conspiracy, both from the Carlist and from the UME end. Mola nominated him to co-ordinate UME preparations in Almeria and neighboring provinces, which he did ensuring also the Traditionalist presence in the plans. Within Carlism, his focus was on Navarre; he toured the region personally visiting minor towns and making sure all was ready for the rising. Historians think him a man which “proved an invaluable link between the Communion and the conspiring officers”. He represented a different strategy than the Traditionalist leader, Fal; the latter intended to close a political deal with the military before committing requetés, Rada preferred the opposite. Rada was reportedly “visibly chafing at the delay caused by Fal Conde’s obduracy” and eventually he formed a dissenting group, which cornered Fal and pressured him to declare Carlist participation with no tangible commitments on part of Mola.

== Civil War ==
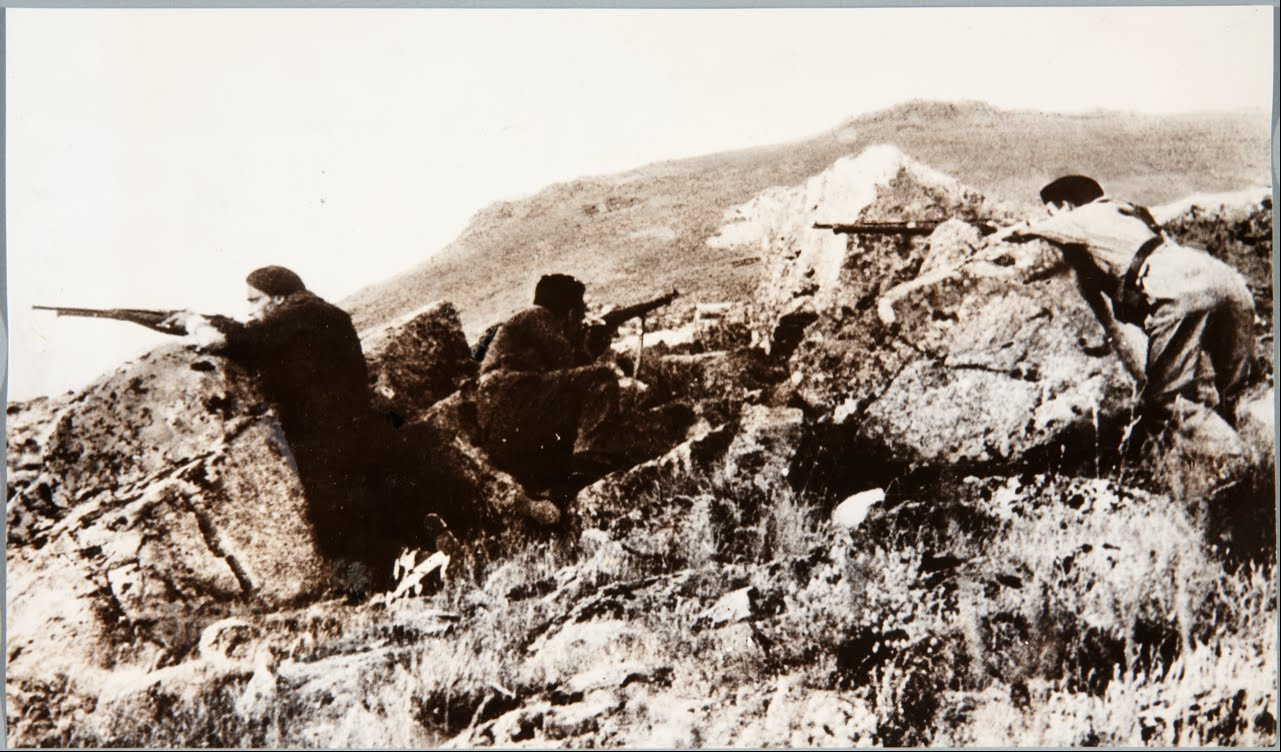
Guadarrama fightings, 1936

During the July 1936 coup, Rada resided in Navarre; following smooth seizure of the region, as second in command of a rebel column led by Francisco García Escámez, he left Pamplona. Having suffocated a resistance island in Logroño on July 22 they reached Sierra de Guadarrama and engaged in combat for control of mountain passes. After a local breakthrough, his troops reached Braojos, but failed to advance further. In August and September, Rada led his men in the Navafria sector fighting for Puerto de Lozoya; he was promoted to full coronel. In November, his units crossed Navalperal and Fresnedellas; in Brunete, he joined the units of Varela. In December, he set his HQ in Leganés. Since early 1937, Rada was commanding mixed units comparable to a brigade, including requetés but also the Moroccans. His men seized Cerro de los Angeles and then Vaciamadrid. In February and March, he was crucially involved in the Battle of Jarama. In April he took command of 2. Brigade from 4. Division.

In the summer of 1936, Rada was nominated to the wartime Carlist executive, Junta Nacional Carlista de Guerra; as head of requetés he formed part of its Sección Militar. Following death of the Carlist king Alfonso Carlos back in 1936, Rada declared full loyalty to the new dynastic leader, Don Javier. However, he demonstrated no reluctance when Comunión Tradicionalista was forcefully merged into a new state party, Falange Española Tradicionalista; in May 1937, he was nominated one of 2 deputy commanders of the new, combined FET militia. He was among some 10 top Carlists in the FET structures. Some episodes suggest that within FET he tried to assure Carlist domination, but the evidence is not clear. Following nomination he left his troops for Salamanca, but his role of militia commander was formal. In June he flew to Africa to raise the 152. Division in Tetuan. In July 1937, Rada was nominated Gobernador Militar de Cáceres and commanded the provincial frontline, relying mostly on the 152. Division. As governor, he was responsible for harsh repressive measures.

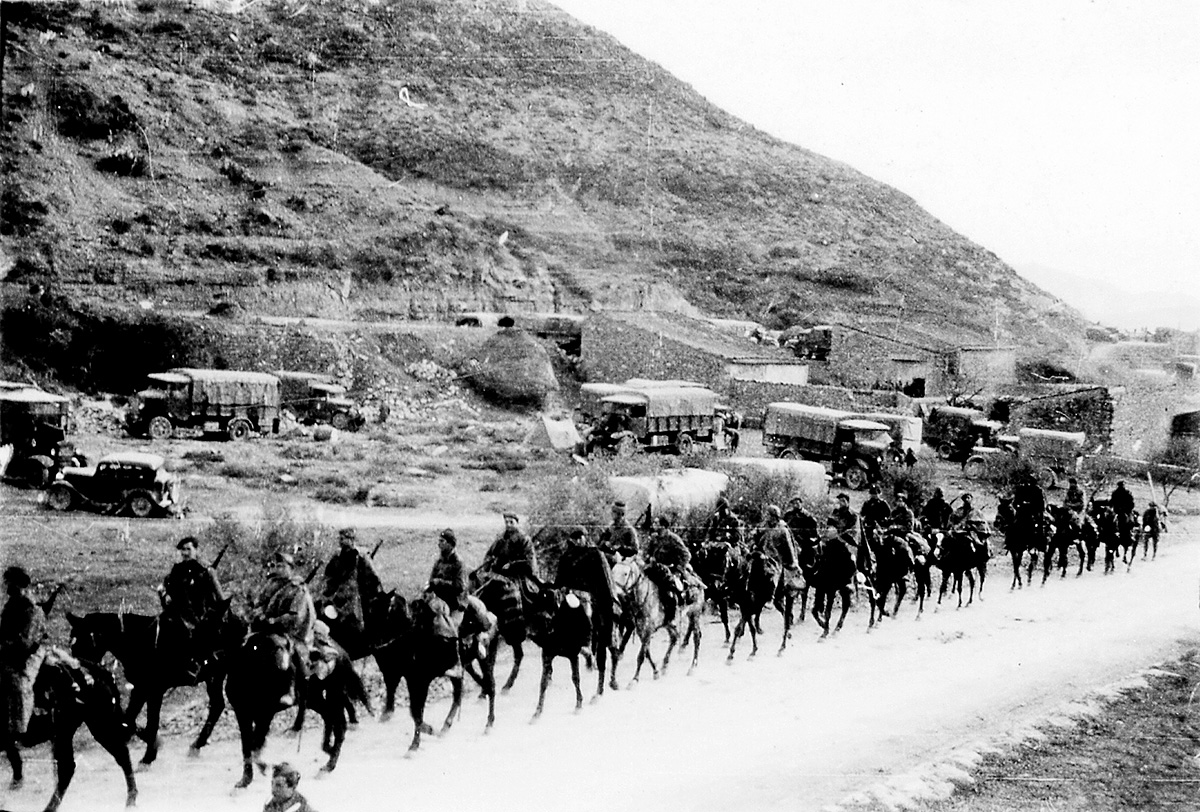
advancing Nationalists, early 1939

In March 1938, Rada was released from his Cáceres duties; his 152. (which included Carlist units of Tercio de Cristo Rey and Tercio de Alcazar) was deployed at the confluence of Soria, Zaragoza and Guadalajara provinces. Following some combat in May, they moved to the Calatayud sector; Rada was promoted to Brigadier. In late spring he led advance across northern Aragon and in late May set his HQ in Tremp, already in Catalonia. In August the division was shuttled to the Ebro bend and took part in fierce combat across key sectors, including Villalba dels Arcs, Vertice Gaeta, and then in September and October in Sierra de Fatarrella. In November 1938, Rada assumed command of Cuerpo de Ejército Marroquí; with his HQ in Batea and then Montanejos, he took part in failed assaults towards the Valencian plains. At the war’s end, his corps reached the outskirts of Valencia.

== Post-war career ==
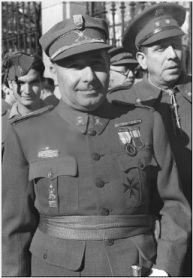
Rada, 1941

In late 1939, Rada temporarily assumed command of Cuerpo de Ejército de Castilla; later he ceded the 152. and assumed command of 13. Division, based in Barcelona. He was also nominated inspector of armored troops, a branch hardly existent in the Spanish army and composed mostly of the captured ex-Soviet T-26 vehicles. A spate of honors followed, with Medalla de Campaña, Cruz Roja del Mérito Militar, and two Cruces de Guerra. In 1940, he was nominated Presidente de la Sociedad de Socorros Mutuos del Arma de Infantería. The same year he visited Nazi Germany learning from tank warfare experiences in Poland and was awarded the Verdienstorden vom Deutschen Adler, apart from Portuguese and Italian honors received later. In 1941, he was nominated vocal suplente in Tribunal Especial para la Represión de la Masonería y el Comunismo; it is not clear how long he served. In 1942, Rada was promoted to division general; in 1943 he ceased as jefe of 13. Division and assumed command of División Acorazada, the first armored division in the Spanish army. At this post, he served until 1945.

During short spells in the mid-1940s, Rada acted as caretaker commander of I. Región Militar (Madrid); in 1945, he became commander of Cuerpo de Ejército de Maestrazgo. In 1946, he was promoted to teniente general and took command of II. Región Militar (Seville) and Cuerpo de Ejército de Andalucia. This proved the highest position in his military career, the one he held for an unusually long period of 6 years until 1952; that year he relinquished command of a tangible force and assumed management of Museo del Ejército. Though in 1955 he passed to reserve, Rada headed the museum until his death.

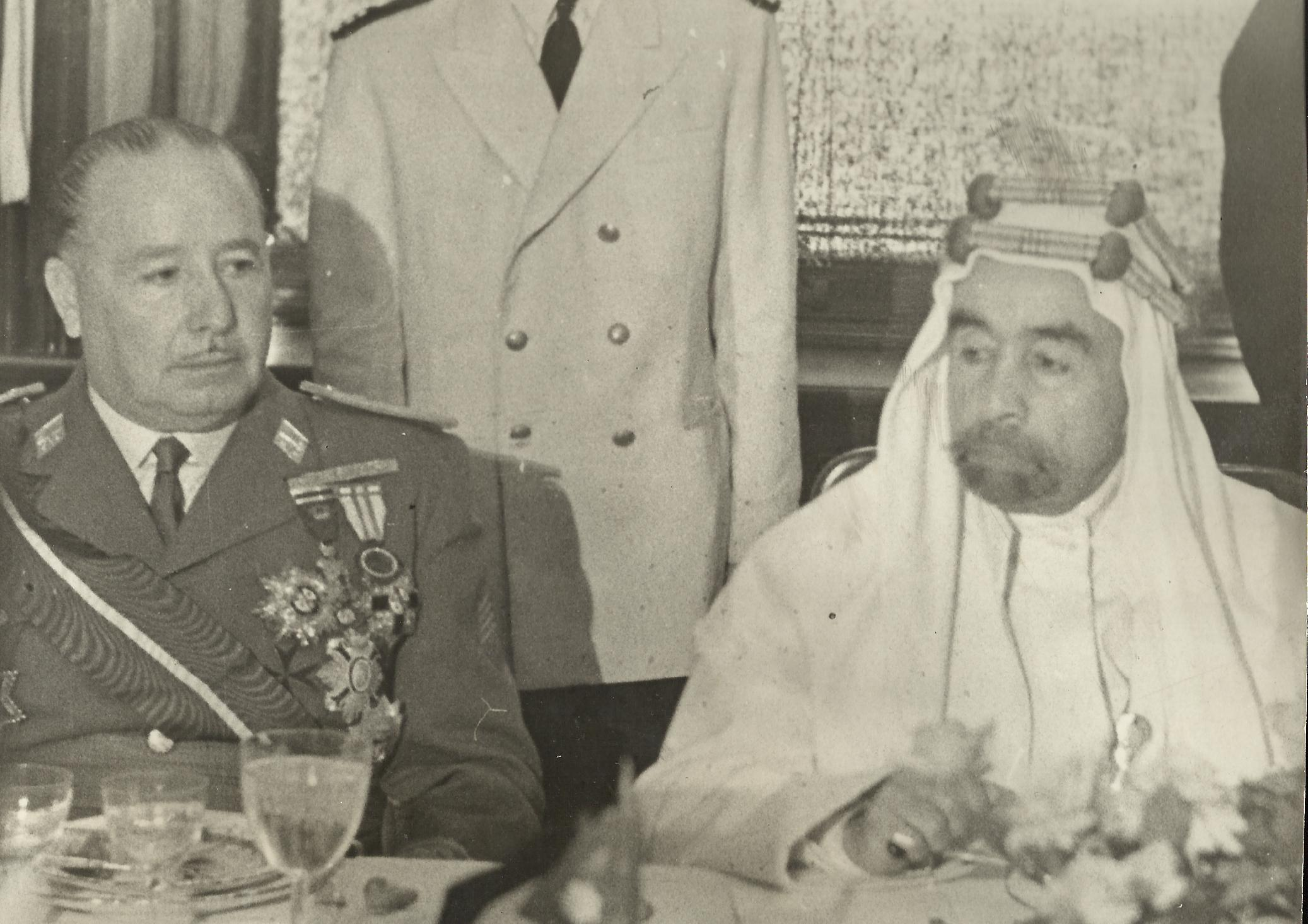
with Moroccan leader, 1950s

There is little information on Rada’s post-war political allegiances. He appeared to have been loyal to Franco, did not sign letters pressing monarchist restoration, was admitted at personal audiences in 1939, 1945, 1946 and 1952, and in 1948 received Gran Cruz de la Orden del Mérito Civil, one of the highest decorations available. However, within Falange he was considered a reactionary monarchist and a representative of an oligarchy which aimed at “restauración social”. In the early 1940s, he secretly conferred with the Carlists possibly up to the point of mounting some schemes. The Francoist security reported with unease that during Semana Santa in Granada a fully uniformed requeté unit paraded across the city saluted on tribune by Utrilla and Rada. Another report claimed that Carlists operated a front organisation directed by Tomás Lucendo Muñoz, “persona de la confianza del General Rada”. Some scholars claim that in the early 1940s, he was “el general de ideología carlista más significado y de mayor pedigrí tradicionalista de todo el ejército”. However, no work on Carlist history in the post-war era mentions Rada as involved, and it seems that though he might have nurtured some Traditionalist sympathies, politically he got fully integrated with the Francoist regime.

== See also ==
- Falange Española de las JONS
- Carlism
- Traditionalism (Spain)
- Armoured Division No. 1 "Brunete"

== Footnotes ==
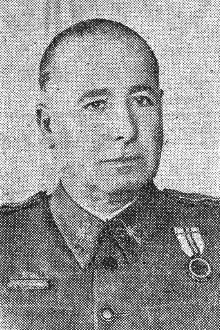
Rada, 1946
