= Tatsuo Sasaki =

Tatsuo Sasaki may refer to:

- Tatsuo Sasaki (musician) (佐々木 達夫, born 1944), Japanese musician
- Tatsuo Sasaki (wrestler) (佐々木 竜雄, born 1942), Japanese sport wrestler
