= Alejo Alvarez =

Filipino shot putter and discus thrower

Medal record

Men's athletics

Representing the Philippines

Far Eastern Championship Games
Gold medal – first place	1917 Tokyo	Shot put
Silver medal – second place	1917 Tokyo	Discus throw
Gold medal – first place	1919 Manila	Shot put
Gold medal – first place	1919 Manila	Discus throw

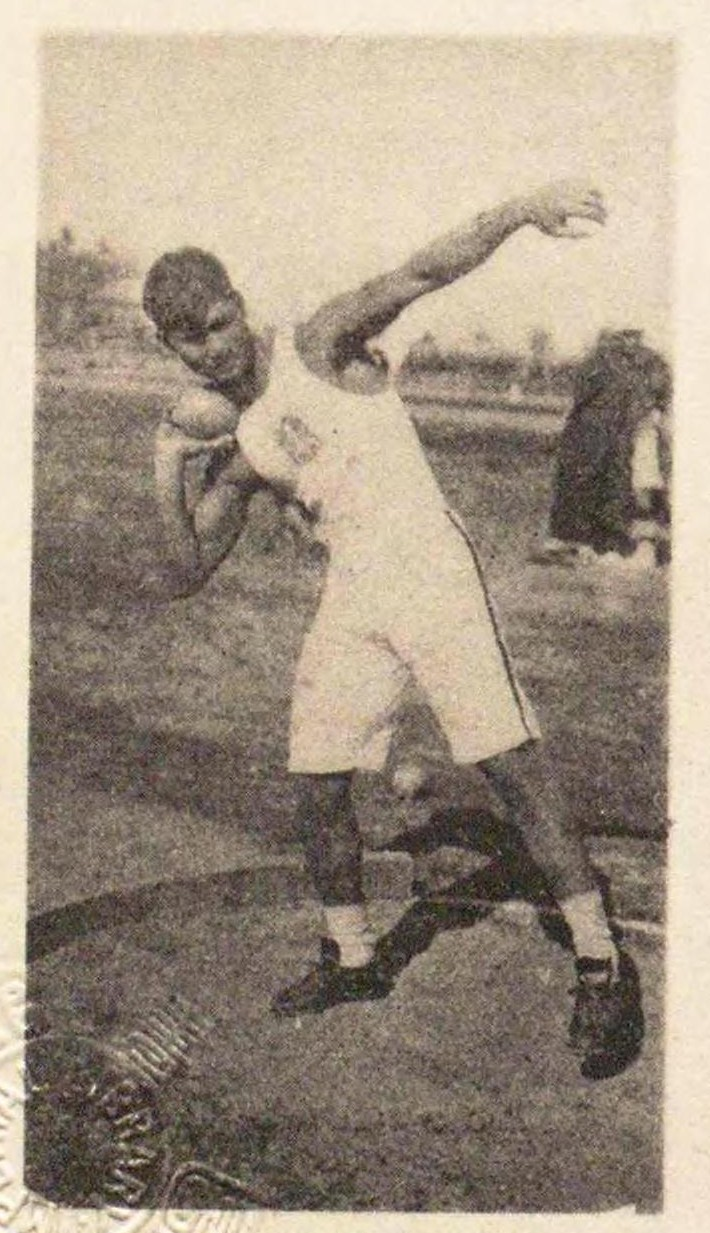
Alejo Alvarez

Alejo Alvarez (c. 1890s – c. 1940s) was a Filipino track and field athlete who competed in the shot put and discus throw events.

Alongside Regino Ylanan, he was the most successful throws athlete at the Far Eastern Championship Games. Alvarez competed in two editions of the competition. At the 1917 Tokyo Games he won the shot put with a throw of 10.69 m (35 ft 3/4 in) and was runner-up in the discus to compatriot Rafael Montes with a mark of 31.10 m (102 ft 1/4 in).

He returned at the following edition in Manila in 1919 and completed a throws double for the host nation. He won the discus with a throw of 32.20 m (105 ft 7 1/2 in) and defended his shot put title with 11.38 m (37 ft 4 in) – the first time a man cleared eleven metres at the event. This made him one of Asia's foremost throws athletes at the start of the 20th century. He was one of only a dozen track athletes to win three or more individual titles during the history of the Far Eastern Championship Games, which was the first major multi-sport event in Asia and a forerunner to the Asian Games.

He was killed in the Philippines during World War II, defending against the Japanese invasion.
