= Toshirō =

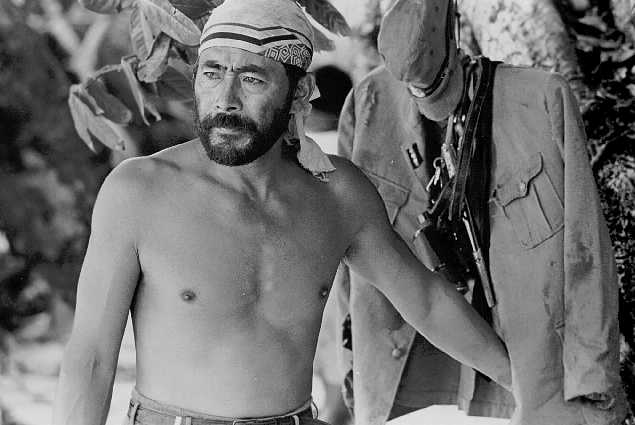
- Toshiro Mifune (1920–1997), Japanese actor
- Pronunciation: toɕiɾoɯ (IPA)
- Gender: Male

Origin
- Origin: Japanese
- Meaning: It can have many different meanings depending on the kanji used.

Other names
- Alternative spelling: Tosiro (Kunrei-shiki) Tosiro (Nihon-shiki) Toshirō, Toshiro, Toshirou, Toshiroh (Hepburn)

Toshirō is a masculine Japanese given name.

== Written forms ==
Toshirō can be written using different combinations of kanji characters. Here are some examples:

- 利郎, "advantage, son"
- 敏郎, "agile, son"
- 俊郎, "sagacious, son"
- 利朗, "advantage, bright"
- 敏朗, "agile, bright"
- 俊朗, "sagacious, bright"

The name can also be written in hiragana としろう or katakana トシロウ.

== Notable people with the name ==
- Toshiro Ide (井手 俊郎, 1910–1988), Japanese screenwriter.
- Toshiro Kageyama (影山 利郎, 1926–1990), Japanese Go player.
- Toshiro Kandagawa (神田川 俊郎, 1939–2021), Japanese chef.
- Toshiro Konishi (トシロウ・コニシ, 1953–2016), Japanese-Peruvian chef, musician and television personality.
- Toshiro Masuda (増田 俊郎, born 1959), Japanese composer.
- Toshiro Mayuzumi (黛 敏郎, 1929–1997), Japanese composer.
- Toshirō Mifune (三船 敏郎, 1920–1997), Japanese actor.
- Toshirō Mutō (武藤 敏郎, born 1943), former Deputy Governor of the Bank of Japan.
- Toshiro Nomura (野村 敏郎), Japanese astronomer.
- Toshiro Sasaki (佐左木 俊郎, 1900–1933), Japanese author.
- Toshiro Suga (菅 俊朗, born 1950), aikido instructor.
- Toshiro Tashiro (田代 俊郎; born 1942), Japanese sport wrestler.
- Toshiro Tomochika (友近 聡朗, born 1975), Japanese politician.
- Toshiro Tsuchida (土田 俊郎, born 1964), Japanese game director.
- Toshiro Yabuki (矢吹 俊郎, born 1961), Japanese music composer.
- Toshiro Yamabe (山部 俊郎, 1926–2000), Japanese Go player.
- Toshirō Yanagiba (柳葉 敏郎, born 1961), Japanese actor.

== Fictional characters ==
- Toshiro Kurusu (栗栖 敏郎), a character in the 2001 anime film WXIII: Patlabor the Movie 3.
- Toshiro Hijikata (土方 十四郎), a character in the manga and anime series Gintama.
- Toshiro Umezawa (梅澤 俊郎), a character in the collectible card game Magic: The Gathering.
- Toshiro Hitsugaya (日番谷 冬獅郎), the captain of tenth division in Bleach.
- Toshiro Makabe, a character in the video game Shogo: Mobile Armor Division
