= Athletics at the 1919 Far Eastern Championship Games =

IV Far Eastern Championship Games
- Dates: May 1919
- Host city: Manila, Philippines
- Events: 18
- Participation: 3 nations

At the 1919 Far Eastern Championship Games, the athletics events were held in Manila, Philippines in May. A total of 18 athletics events were contested at the competition. The five-mile road race was held for the last time, being replaced by a five-mile track race at the following edition.

The host nation, the Philippines, dominated in the sport, winning thirteen of the eighteen gold medals on offer. The Japanese took three gold medals, reaching the podium in running events only. China's two golds came in the combined track and field events and most of its other medals came in field events.

Fortunato Catalon of the Philippines defended both his 100-yard dash and 220-yard dash titles from the 1917 edition. Two of his team mates, shot putter Alejo Alvarez and high hurdles specialist Constantino Rabaya, were the only other athletes to repeat as champions. Alvarez also won the discus throw title on this occasion. Japan's best athlete was Kiyoji Ikuta, who won the mile run and five-mile titles. Chu Ente was the only Chinese to top the athletics podium at the games, and he did so twice by winning the decathlon and pentathlon.

== Medal summary ==
Event	Gold		Silver		Bronze	
100 yards	Fortunato Catalon (PHI)	10.0	Sasago Madono (JPN)	???	Nicholas Machan (PHI)	???
220 yards straight	Fortunato Catalon (PHI)	23.0	Sasago Madono (JPN)	???	Francisco Danao (PHI)	???
440 yards	Francisco Danao (PHI)	51.6	Valentin Malinao (PHI)	???	Iwao Saeki (JPN)	???
880 yards	Iwao Saeki (JPN)	2:05.0	Valentin Malinao (PHI)	???	Juan Taduran (PHI)	???
One mile	Kiyoji Ikuta (JPN)	4:52.0	Gishiro Taku (JPN)	???	Chang Taping (CHN)	???
Five miles (road)	Kiyoji Ikuta (JPN)	29:26	Shondsuke Koide (JPN)	???	Umali (PHI)	???
120 yd hurdles	Constantino Rabaya (PHI)	16.2	Emilio Bucoy (PHI)	???	Andres Buenaventura (PHI)	???
220 yd hurdles straight	Calixto Bello (PHI)	26.4	Cattrell (PHI)	???	Cabalse (PHI)	???
4×220 yd relay	Philippines (PHI)	1:38.2	China (CHN)	???	Only two finishers	
4×400 yd relay	Philippines (PHI)	3:36.0	Japan (JPN)	???	China (CHN)	???
High jump	Rufino Ico (PHI)	1.72 m	Shi Chiaohan (CHN)	??? m	Leung Chungkan (CHN)	??? m
Pole vault	Antonio Alo (PHI)	3.31 m	Faustino Carlos (PHI)	??? m	Puno (PHI)	??? m
Long jump	Nicholas Machan (PHI)	6.57 m	Simon Santos (PHI)	??? m	Genaro Saavedra (PHI)	??? m
Shot put	Alejo Alvarez (PHI)	11.38 m	Mang Chimao (CHN)	??? m	Merced (PHI)	??? m
Discus throw	Alejo Alvarez (PHI)	32.20 m	Tu Jungtang (CHN)	31.44 m	Mang Chimao (CHN)	??? m
Javelin throw	J. Guambam (PHI)	46.44 m	Rufino Ico (PHI)	??? m	Francisco Danao (PHI)	??? m
Pentathlon	Chu Ente (CHN)	359 pts	Tu Jungtang (CHN)	358 pts	Wenceslao Villanueva (PHI)	318 pts
Decathlon	Chu Ente (CHN)	755 pts	Juan Taduran (PHI)	752 pts	Shi Chiaohan (CHN)	697 pts
