= Sasaki =

Sasaki may refer to:

- Sasaki (clan), Japanese clan
- Sasaki (surname), Japanese surname
- Sasaki (company), American landscape architecture firm
- Sasaki and Miyano, Japanese manga series
- Sasaki and Peeps, Japanese light novel series
