= Tomiaki =

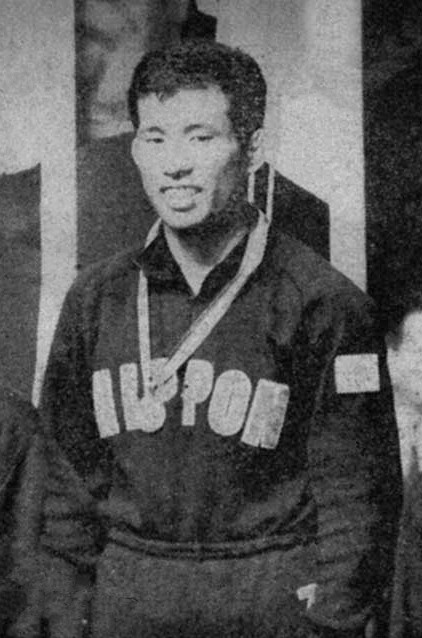
- Tomiaki Fukuda, Japanese sport wrestler and sports official
- Pronunciation: tomiakʲi (IPA)
- Gender: Male

Origin
- Origin: Japanese
- Meaning: Different meanings depending on the kanji used

Tomiaki is a masculine Japanese given name.

== Written forms ==
Tomiaki can be written using different combinations of kanji characters. Some examples:

- 富明, "enrich, bright"
- 富朗, "enrich, clear"
- 富晃, "enrich, clear"
- 富章, "enrich, masculine"
- 富旭, "enrich, rising sun"
- 富亮, "enrich, clear"
- 富彰, "enrich, clear"
- 富昭, "enrich, clear"
- 富秋, "enrich, autumn"
- 富晶, "enrich, sparkle"
- 冨明, "enrich, bright"
- 冨朗, "enrich, clear"
- 冨晃, "enrich, clear"
- 冨章, "enrich, masculine"
- 冨旭, "enrich, rising sun"
- 冨亮, "enrich, clear"

The name can also be written in hiragana とみあき or katakana トミアキ.

== Notable people with the name ==
- Tomiaki Fukuda (福田 富昭; born 1941), Japanese sport wrestler and sports official
- Tomiaki Iso (礒 富昭; born 1954), Japanese rower
- Tomiaki Sasaki (佐々木 富明; 1746 – after 1827), Japanese sculptor
