= Fiñana =

Fiñana, Spain
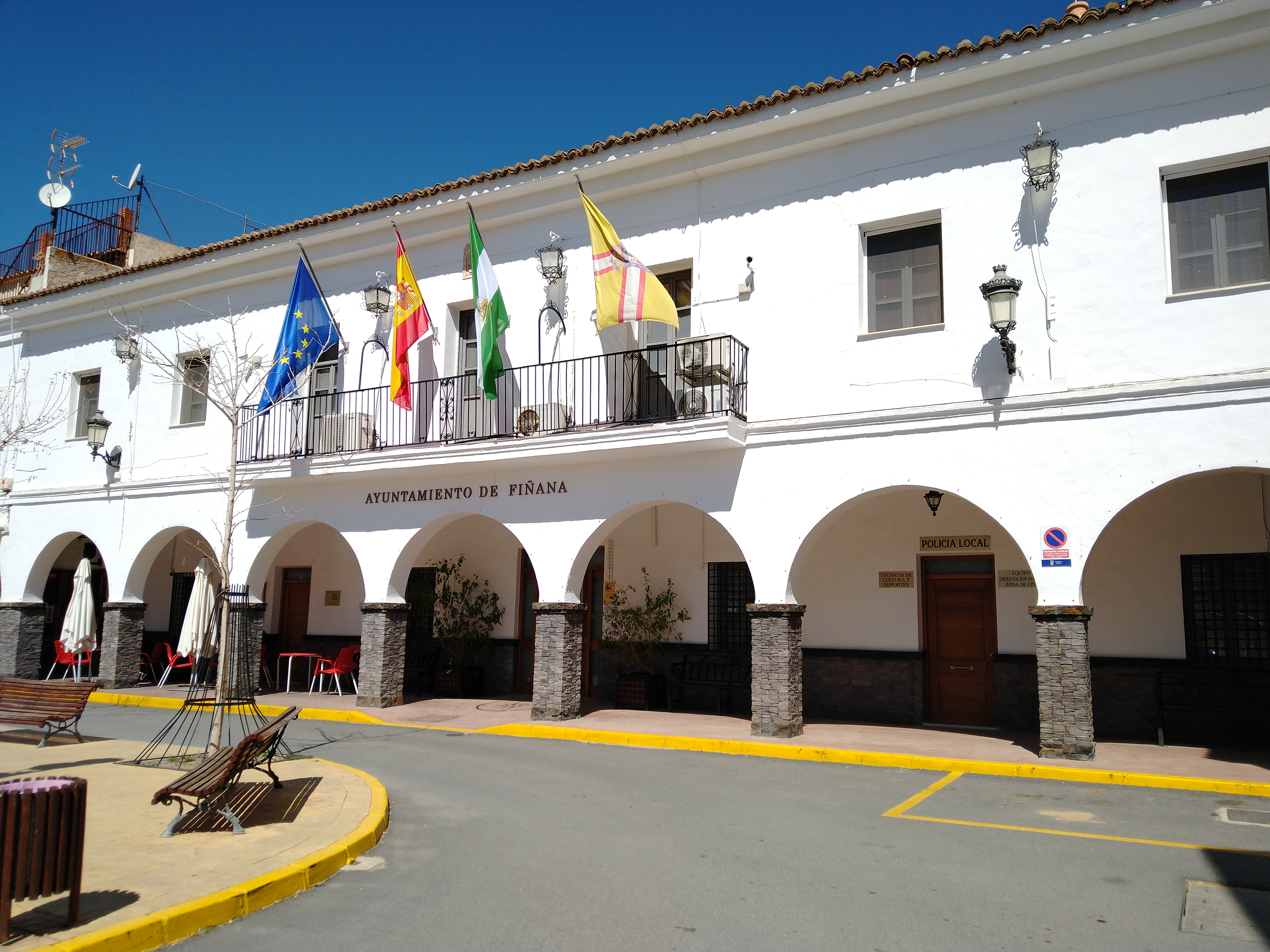
- Town hall

- Flag Coat of arms
- Interactive map of Fiñana, Spain
- Coordinates: 37°10′N 2°50′W
- Country: Spain
- Community: Andalusia
- Municipality: Almería

Government
  - Mayor: Rafael Montes (PSOE)

Area
  - Total: 135 km^{2} (52 sq mi)
- Elevation: 950 m (3,120 ft)

Population (2025-01-01)
  - Total: 1,956
  - Density: 14.5/km^{2} (37.5/sq mi)
- Time zone: UTC+1 (CET)
  - Summer (DST): UTC+2 (CEST)
- Website: finana.com

Fiñana is a municipality of Almería province, in the autonomous community of Andalusia, Spain.

== Demographics ==
Historical population
Year	Pop.	±%
1999	1,727	—
2000	1,741	+0.8%
2001	2,514	+44.4%
2002	2,488	−1.0%
2003	2,450	−1.5%
2004	2,432	−0.7%
2005	2,442	+0.4%
2018	1,992	−18.4%
Source: INE (Spain)
