= The Flow of a River, The Sound of a Violin =

1981 film by Isamu Imakake

- Film poster
- Directed by: Shōichirō Sasaki
- Screenplay by: Shōichirō Sasaki
- Starring: Yukiyo Nakao
- Cinematography: Tetsuro Katsuragi
- Edited by: Tetsuo Matsumoto
- Distributed by: NHK
- Release date: 1 May 1981 (Japan)
- Running time: 80 minutes
- Country: Japan
- Language: Japanese

The Flow of a River, The Sound of a Violin (Japanese: 川の流れはバイオリンの音, Hepburn: Kawa no Nagare wa Violin no Oto) is a 1981 Japanese television film written and directed by Shōichirō Sasaki.

== Cast ==
- Yukiyo Nakao as Eiko
- Jean Rodi
- Giovanni Zaniboni
- Lorenzo Cigoli

== Production ==
The Flow of a River, The Sound of a Violin was written and directed by Shōichirō Sasaki. Filming was done in Cremona, Italy. This was the first part of Sasaki's river trilogy and was followed by Rainbow of Andalusia (1983) and Spring: Sound of Light (1984).

== Release ==
NHK aired the film on 1 May 1981 at 7:30 PM and re-aired it on 11 October at 1:05 PM. It received the Grand Prize at the 36th Agency for Cultural Affairs Arts Festival. The river trilogy was re-aired by the NHK from July 22—24 2025.

== Works cited ==
=== News ===
- 佐々木昭一郎のドラマ3作品がNHKで3日連続オンエア、ゲストに是枝裕和と中尾幸世 [Three dramas by Shoichiro Sasaki will air on NHK for three consecutive days, with Hirokazu Kore-eda and Yukiyo Nakao as guest stars.]. Natalie (in Japanese). 12 July 2025. Archived from the original on 19 April 2026.

=== Web ===
- "Ishji Takashi". Archivio della Liuteria Cremonese. Archived from the original on 27 August 2026.
- NHKアーカイブス(番組) [NHK Archives (Program)]. NHK (in Japanese). Archived from the original on 10 May 2007.
- ＮＨＫ特集 川の流れはバイオリンの音～イタリア・ポー川～ [NHK Special: The Flow of the River Sounds Like a Violin - The Po River in Italy]. NHK (in Japanese).
- "The Flow of a River, The Sound of a Violin". Mubi. Archived from the original on 27 August 2026.
