= Kenkichi Saito =

Japanese swimmer

Personal information
- Native name: 斎藤 兼吉
- Full name: Kenkichi Saito
- Nationality: Japanese
- Born: 2 January 1895
- Died: 26 October 1960 (aged 65)

Sport
- Sport: Swimming
Medal record
Men's athletics
Representing Japan
Far Eastern Championships
Gold medal – first place	1917 Tokyo	Javelin throw
Men's swimming
Representing Japan
Far Eastern Championships
Gold medal – first place	1917 Tokyo	100 yd freestyle
Gold medal – first place	1917 Tokyo	4×100 yd freestyle
Gold medal – first place	1917 Tokyo	4×200 yd freestyle

Kenkichi Saito (斎藤 兼吉, Saitō Kenkichi; 2 January 1895 – 26 October 1960) was a Japanese swimmer, thrower, and educator.

== Biographical ==
Kenkichi Saito was born on 2 January 1895 in Takachi in Sado, Niigata. Growing up, Saito was active in multiple sports. He practiced athletics, judo, baseball, kendo, rowing, swimming, and sumo. Later, he studied at Niigata Normal School and then advanced to Tokyo Higher Normal School to become a teacher. In his first year of studying at the latter school, he joined the swimming club.

Saito won his first national championship title in the 50-yard freestyle at the 1918 National Swimming Championships in Osaka. The following year, he competed at the 1917 Far Eastern Championship Games and won gold medals in the men's 100 yard freestyle, men's 4×100 yard freestyle relay, and men's 4×200 yard freestyle relay in swimming, and the men's javelin in athletics. In the same year, he competed at the National Athletics Championships and won the javelin and discus. He won the men's javelin in the following competition the next year.

He then represented Japan at the 1920 Summer Olympics in Antwerp, Belgium. He initially entered five athletics events but withdrew from all of them. Instead he competed in swimming, competing in the men's 100 metre freestyle and men's 400 metre freestyle.

Saito competed in the heats of the former event on 22 August against five other swimmers. There, he placed last in his round and did not advance to the semifinals. Four days later, he competed in the latter against one other swimmer. He placed second, though advanced to the semifinals with a time of 6:16.8. In the semifinals, he did not finish his race and did not advance to the finals. Although he did not medal, he did learn Duke Kahanamoku's crawl style in swimming and eventually studied sport in Europe for a year.

Once he returned to Japan, he taught physical education at Osaka with a focus on swimming. He then moved to Manchuria and served on the staff of the Manchuria Medical University, the Manchurian College of Education, and the South Manchurian Railway Headquarters to promote physical education in schools in the area. Saito would also join the Dalian Manchu Club baseball business team.

After World War II, Saito returned to his hometown and worked as a part-time teacher and coach. Later, he was a professor in the Faculty of Education at Kanazawa University and Niigata University, with a focus on physical education. He later became professor at Chukyo University in 1959 before dying from gastric cancer on 26 October 1960 in Nagoya.
