= Touima =

Taouima
- Town
- Interactive map of Taouima
- Country: Morocco
- Region: Oriental
- Province: Nador Province

Population (2004)
  - Total: 6,909
- Time zone: UTC+0 (GMT)

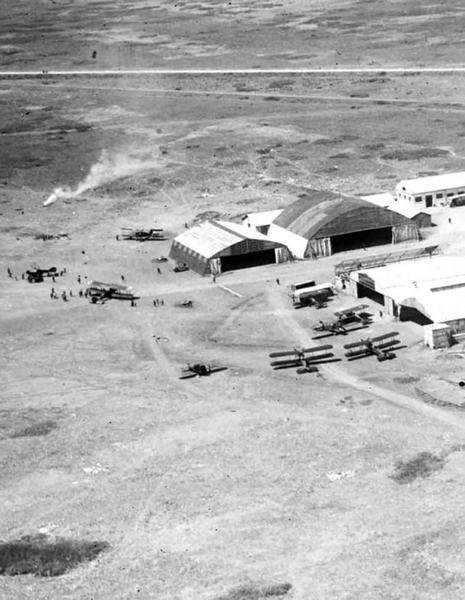
Touima aerodrome

Taouima is a town in Nador Province, Oriental, Morocco. According to the 2004 census it has a population of 6,909.
