= Gensabulo Noguchi =

Japanese athletics competitor

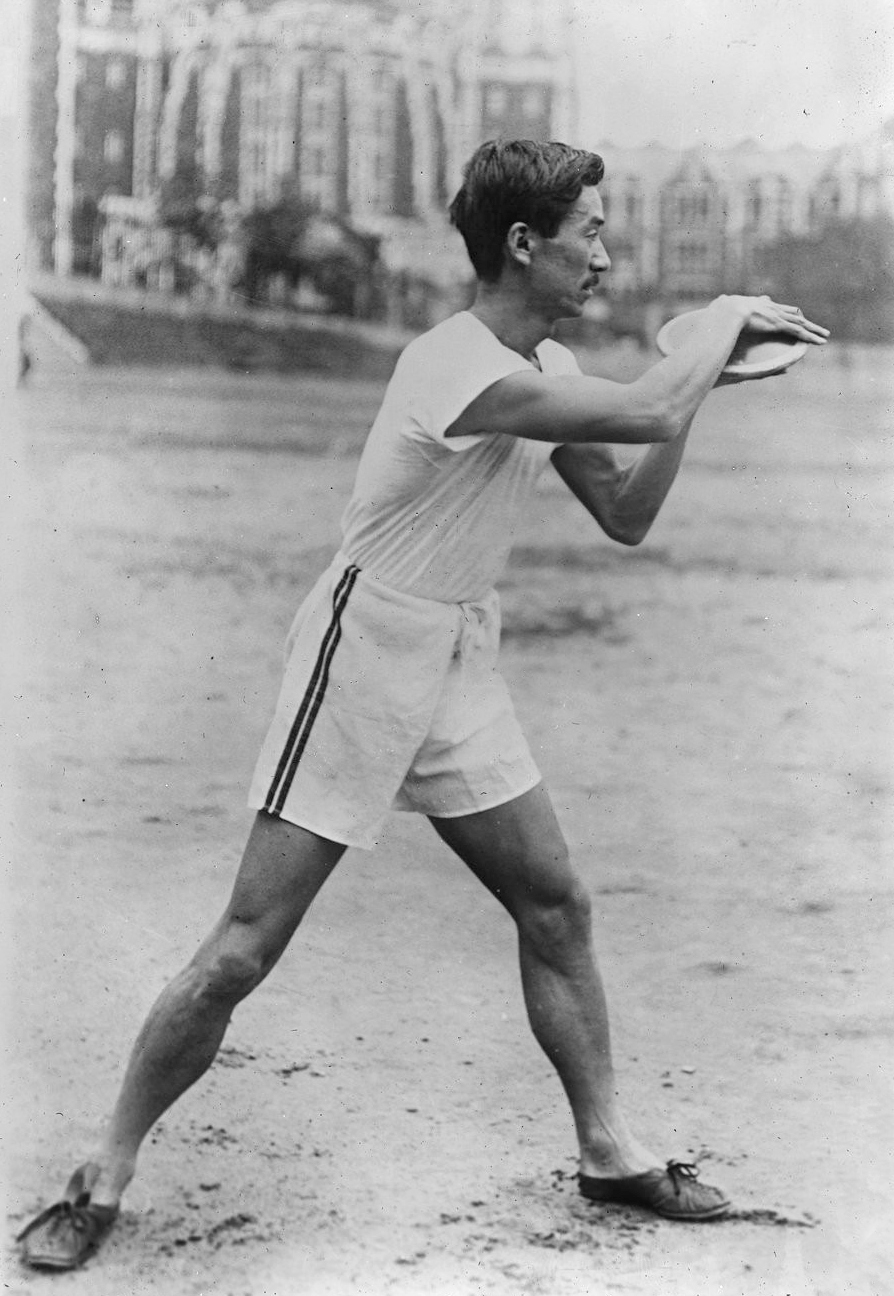
- Noguchi in 1920

Personal information
- Born: August 24, 1888
- Died: March 16, 1967 (aged 78)

Sport
- Sport: Athletics
- Event: Decathlon

Achievements and titles
- Personal best: 3755 (1920)

Gensabulo Noguchi (野口 源三郎, Noguchi Gensaburō; August 24, 1888 – March 16, 1967) was a Japanese decathlete and educator. He competed at the 1920 Summer Olympics and finished in 12th place. Noguchi was also the flag bearer for Japan at those games. He later was a professor of physical education at such universities as the Tokyo University of Education (now Tsukuba University) and Saitama University, contributing to the development of school athletics in Japan.
