= Tatsuo Sasaki (musician) =

American percussionist (born 1944)

Tatsuo Sasaki (佐々木 達夫, born March 30, 1944) is a Japanese percussionist, playing timpani, xylophone and marimba. He became a naturalized American citizen and lives in San Diego, California.

== Career ==
Born in Okayama, Japan, Sasaki received a Fulbright Scholarship to Juilliard while he was a senior at Tokyo University of Arts and Music and studied timpani with Saul Goodman, timpanist with the New York Philharmonic. He received several lessons from noted xylophonist, Yoichi Hiraoka in New York and performed recitals in New York City. In 1966, Sasaki was accepted by the American Symphony Orchestra directed by Leopold Stokowski as a percussionist. In 1967 he was invited by the Israel Philharmonic Orchestra and performed as the assistant timpanist and percussionist for two years.

Sasaki returned to Japan in 1969 and became a member of the Japan Philharmonic Orchestra. He served at Sakuyo Conservatoire as percussion instructor and gave his first solo recital in Tokyo in 1972.

Later that year, Sasaki was invited to the Brazilian Symphony Orchestra and relocated to Rio de Janeiro as a principal timpanist. After 18 months in the orchestra, Peter Erős, music director of San Diego Symphony, invited Sasaki to his orchestra in the US. Sasaki moved to San Diego in the fall of 1973 and served as principal timpanist for the San Diego Symphony and San Diego Opera until his retirement in 2006. He taught timpani, percussion and marimba at University of San Diego and Grossmont College.

Sasaki was featured as a xylophone soloist with the San Diego Symphony, the Glendale Symphony and others. He performed Fantasy on Japanese Wood Prints by Alan Hovhaness conducted by Andre Kostelanetz; Marimba Concerto by Robert Kurka; Concertino for Marimba by Paul Creston, Suite No. 2 by J. S. Bach, and other pieces.

After retirement from the orchestra, Sasaki concentrated his work on the marimba through his teachings, masterclasses, and conducting marimba ensembles in Tokyo and Nagoya. In 2009 Sasaki formed The Marimba Duo with marimbist/music arranger/music publisher Michiko Noguchi in Tokyo. The Marimba Duo released several CDs and performed concerts.

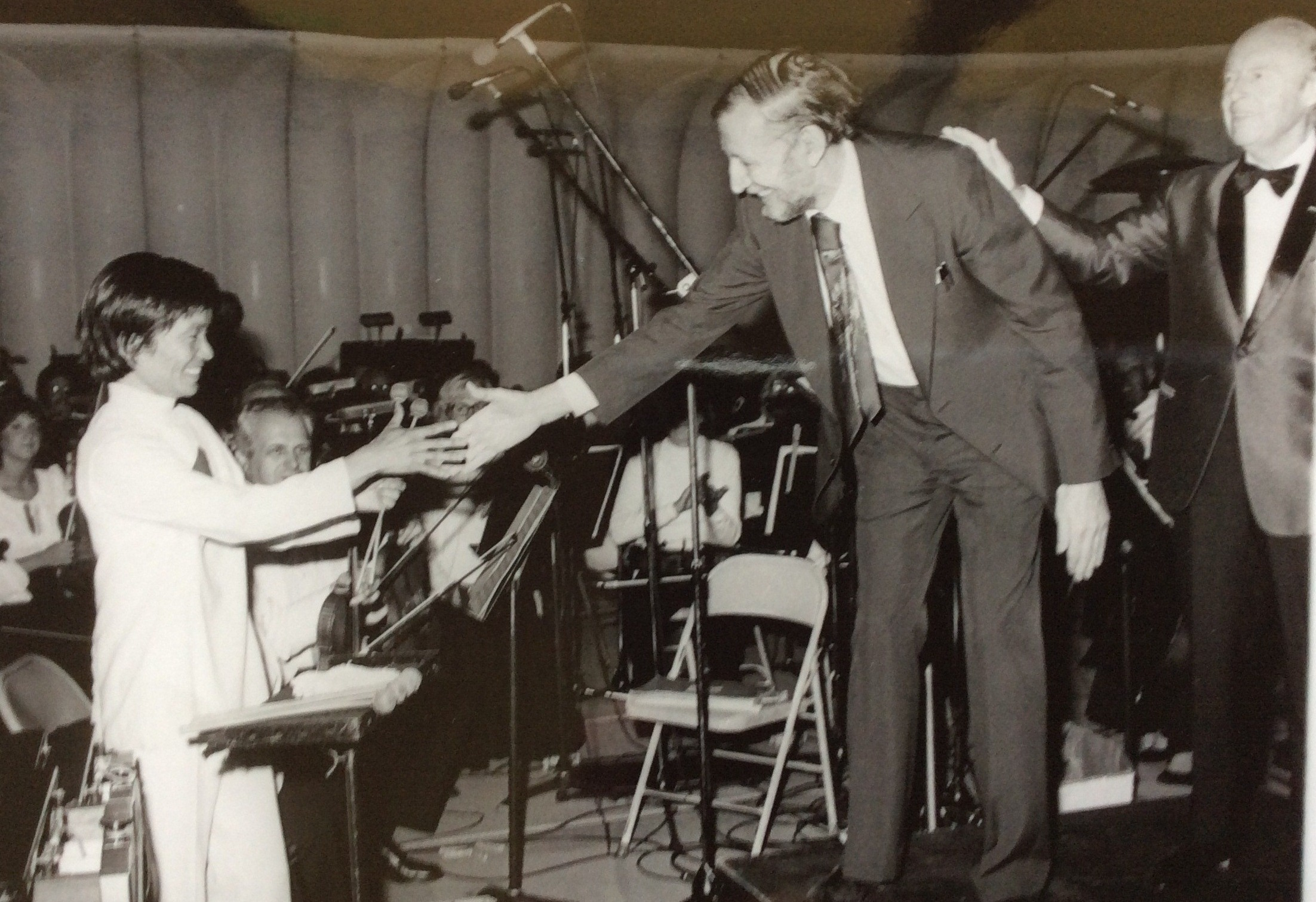
At the concert Fantasy on Japanese Woodprints (1975); Sasaki, Allan Hovhaness, Andre Kostelanetz (left to right)

== Recorded CDs ==
- 1983 Xylophone Artistry (solo) Musical Heritage Society, US
- 2009 Riverdance (The Marimba Duo) Kleos, US
- 2011 Tempest (The Marimba Duo) Kleos, US
- 2017 Back to Bach (The Marimba Duo + Marimba Ensemble) Kojima Recording, Japan
