= Shōichirō Sasaki =

Japanese film director (1936–2024)

- 佐々木昭一郎
- Born: January 25, 1936; Tokyo, Japan
- Died: June 14, 2024 (aged 88)
- Occupation: Filmmaker
- Notable work: Dream Island Girl; Four Seasons: Utopiano; River series

Shōichirō Sasaki (佐々木昭一郎, Sasaki Shōichirō; January 25, 1936 – June 14, 2024) was a Japanese filmmaker.

== Biography ==
Sasaki was born on January 25, 1936, in Tokyo, Japan. During World War II, Sasaki was frequently evacuated to the countryside. His father, Shūichirō, was a freelance journalist who had been fired in 1930 after criticizing the Japanese military. After working in Manchukuo under surveillance by the Special Higher Police, Shūichirō returned to Tokyo in July 1943. According to Shōichirō, his father began to bleed from the mouth and collapsed after eating a peach from a vendor while they were travelling to his father's native Miyagi Prefecture. His father was then hauled away by secret police agents disguised as sailors, and died in custody.

Sasaki graduated from Rikkyo University and was hired by NHK in 1960, and began directing radio dramas. He collaborated with Shūji Terayama on the 1966 radio drama Comet Ikeya, Terayama adding a fictional narrative to Sasaki's interviews with amateur astronomer Kaoru Ikeya. Sasaki directed several films for NHK, beginning with the 1969 film Mother. His films won multiple awards and enjoyed support primarily from young viewers, influencing future directors such as Hirokazu Kore-eda, Naomi Kawase and Shinya Tsukamoto. After retiring from NHK in 1995, Sasaki worked as a professor at Bunkyo University until 2005. His first and only feature film, Harmonics Minyoung, is an anti-war quasi-documentary musical in Japanese, Korean and English, with period scenes based on his own wartime experiences including the death of his father.

Sasaki died on June 14, 2024, at the age of 88.

== Selected filmography ==
Mother	マザー	1970
Wanderer	さすらい	1971
Dream Island Girl	夢の島少女	1974
Red Flowers	紅い花	1976
Four Seasons: Utopiano	四季・ユートピアノ	1980
The Flow of a River, The Sound of a Violin	川の流れはバイオリンの音	1981
Rainbow of Andalusia	アンダルシアの虹	1981
Spring: The Light of Sound	春・音の光	1984
Tokyo on the City	東京 オン・ザ・シティー	1986
Summer Album	夏のアルバム	1986
Under the Shade of a Coolabah Tree	クーリバの木の下で	1987
The Sound of the Bell–from Prague to Hiroshima	鐘のひびき 〜プラハからヒロシマへ	1988
Nanairo Village	七色村	1989
Jan Letzel Apocalypse – The Man Who Built the Hiroshima Dome (aka The Paradise Garden)	ヤン・レツル物語 〜広島ドームを建てた男	1991
Paradise of Paradise: The Sound of Mother	パラダイス オブ パラダイス 〜母の声〜	1993
The Screams of August	八月の叫び	1995
Harmonics Minyoung	ミンヨン 倍音の法則	2014
