= Yoichi Hiraoka =

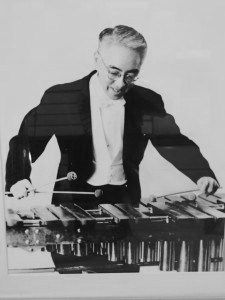
Yoichi Hiraoka

Yoichi Hiraoka (平岡 養一, Yoichi Hiraoka, August 16, 1907 – July 13, 1981) was a xylophonist in Japan. He permanently resided in the United States in 1963.

== Career ==
Hiraoka passed an audition with NBC in 1930, and for the next 11 years his xylophone music was heard every day throughout the United States. After nearly 4,000 days with NBC, the Second World War resulted in Hiraoka's resignation from NBC. He gave recitals in New York City and received high praises from New York Times. He also entrusted many records and works, and left many achievements.

After returning to Japan, he became a national hero and began making daily appearances at recitals and on radio programs, building up the popularity of xylophone playing in Japan. Hiraoka later moved to the United States in 1963 and eventually obtained American citizenship.

In 1978, Hiraoka was awarded Japan's Order of the Sacred Treasure, 4th Class (Gold Rays with Rosette).

== Document ==
Yoichi Hiraoka: His Artistic Life and His Influence on the Art of Xylophone Performance
