= Rafael Montes =

Rafael Montes (November 27, 1923 – January 8, 2012) was a Salvadoran physician and operatic tenor.

== Biography ==
Montes was born in San Salvador. He was the son of Rosario Lemus de Montes and Dr. Baltazar Montes, founder of the Hospital Bloom, Medical College of El Salvador and the School of Nursing. As a fourth-year medical student he decided to follow his true passion: music. He began to perform in his native country, Guatemala and Nicaragua in events organized by Iris Sol, a well known singing instructor in the country at the time. Through his efforts he was able to be accepted into the San Francisco Opera in California. While in San Francisco he met singing master Bellini who saw great potential in the young Rafael and gave him a scholarship to train under him. Under Bellini he was able to perfect his vocal techniques but also received training in composing works, stage performing and singing operas, operettas and zarzuelas.

Later, he met Francis Bloem, president of the Beverly Hills performing arts company, who saw his potential and sent him to a singing contest in New Orleans, where Montes won third place. He was pleasantly surprised as he was invited to perform at the 20th anniversary commemoration of the bombing of Pearl Harbor at the Disneyland Hotel in Los Angeles on December 7, 1961. He performed the only musical number, accompanied on piano by Bloem.

His later performances took him to various U.S. locations, Argentina and other Latin American countries. In addition to his role as a dramatic tenor, musician, guitarist, composer, voice coach and music teacher he was also the founder of the Opera of El Salvador, which even in its early years boasted 80 members and a group of soloists. He was also the director of culture of the Universidad Nacional (1977-1979) and later founded the trio Mangoré .

== Awards and recognition ==
Plaque of honor at the Cultural Center of El Salvador in 2004, Cultural prize, Recognition by Lic. Antonia Portillo de Galindo specializing in Voice, Channel 4 TV awards (El Salvador) in 2008, as well as numerous other awards for developing his students.

== Later life ==
He married Zoila Yolanda Diaz, who was also a singer in the 1940s and 1950s. He had five children with her: Nora, Yolanda, Anabella, Marlene and Gina.
