= Hitoshi Sasaki =

Japanese footballer and manager

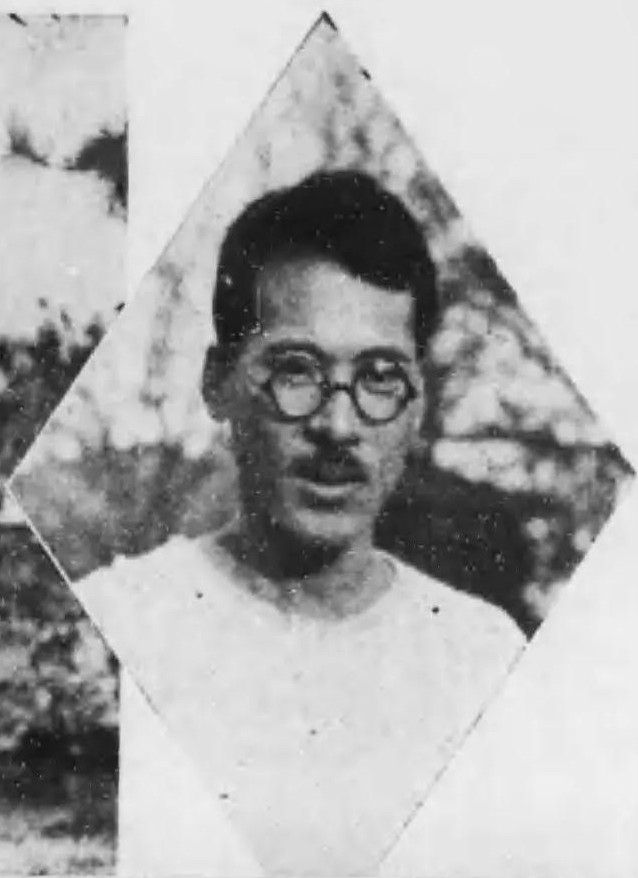
- Image of Hitoshi Sasaki

Personal information
- Full name: Hitoshi Sasaki
- Date of birth: 1891
- Place of birth: Fukushima, Empire of Japan
- Date of death: July 23, 1982 (aged 90–91)
- Place of death: Suginami, Tokyo, Japan
- Position: Midfielder

Youth career
- Tokyo Higher Normal School

International career
| Years | Team | Apps | (Gls) |
| 1917 | Japan | 1 | (0) |

Managerial career
- 1921: Japan

Hitoshi Sasaki (佐々木 等, Sasaki Hitoshi; 1891 – July 23, 1982) was a Japanese football player and manager. He managed Japan national team.

== Coaching career ==
Sasaki was born in Fukushima Prefecture in 1891. After graduating from Tokyo Higher Normal School, in May 1921, he became manager for Japan national team for 1921 Far Eastern Championship Games in Shanghai. He managed 2 matches at this competition, but Japan lost in both matches (1-3, v Philippines and 0-4, v Republic of China). These matches are not counted as International A Match because Japan Football Association was not founded.

== After retirement ==
After retirement, Sasaki became a professor and he taught at Utsunomiya University, Fukushima University, Chukyo University and Japan Women's College of Physical Education and so on.

On July 23, 1982, Sasaki died of lung thrombus in Suginami, Tokyo at the age of 91.
