= Sasago Tani =

Japanese sprinter

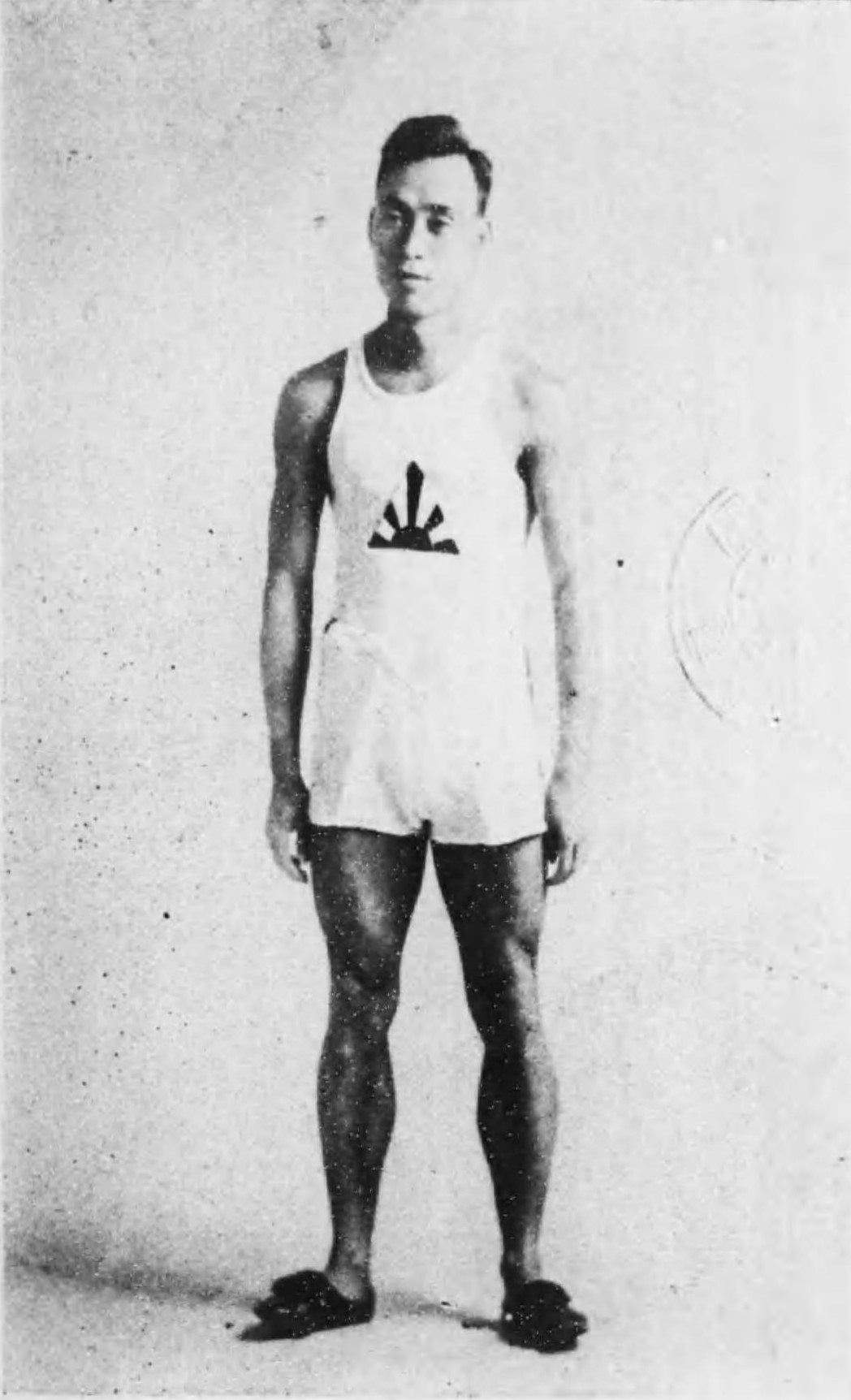
- 1924

Personal information
- Nationality: Japanese
- Born: 9 May 1894
- Died: 24 July 1956 (aged 62)

Sport
- Sport: Track and field
- Event(s): 100m, 200m

Sasago Tani (谷 三三五, Tani Sasago; 9 May 1894 – 24 July 1956) was a Japanese sprinter. He competed in the men's 100 metres and the 200 metres events at the 1924 Summer Olympics.

Tani was born Sasago Madono (真殿 三三五) in Iri Village in the former Wake District (today Bizen City) of Okayama Prefecture. He graduated from Meiji University and worked for the Japanese Government Railways, among other jobs. By 1924 he had changed his surname to Tani. In November 1925, at the age of 31, he became the first Japanese sprinter to break the 11-second mark in the 100 metre dash. He died in 1956.
