= Sasaki Tomiaki =

Japanese netsuke carver

- 佐々木 富明
- Born: 1746
- Died: 1827 (aged 80–81)
- Known for: Netsuke carver

Sasaki Tomiaki (佐々木 富明; 1746 – after 1827) was a Japanese netsuke carver. His work can be seen at the Los Angeles County Museum of Art.
