= Toshiro Sasaki =

Japanese author

Toshiro Sasaki (佐左木 俊郎, Sasaki Toshirō) (April 14, 1900 – March 13, 1933) was a Japanese author in the early 20th century. Most of his works have been published through the Aozora Bunko project.

He was born in Miyagi Prefecture.
