= List of Olympic medalists in athletics (men) =

This is the complete list of men's medalists in athletics at the Summer Olympics. It does not include the medalists from the Athletics at the 1906 Intercalated Games – these are no longer regarded as an official part of the Olympic chronology by the IOC.

== Men's events ==
=== 100 metres ===
Games	Gold	Silver	Bronze
1896 Athens	Thomas Burke; United States	Fritz Hofmann; Germany	Francis Lane; United States
1896 Athens	Thomas Burke; United States	Fritz Hofmann; Germany	Alajos Szokolyi; Hungary
1900 Paris	Frank Jarvis; United States	Walter Tewksbury; United States	Stan Rowley; Australia
1904 St. Louis	Archie Hahn; United States	Nathaniel Cartmell; United States	William Hogenson; United States
1908 London	Reggie Walker; South Africa	James Rector; United States	Robert Kerr; Canada
1912 Stockholm	Ralph Craig; United States	Alvah Meyer; United States	Donald Lippincott; United States
1920 Antwerp	Charley Paddock; United States	Morris Kirksey; United States	Harry Edward; Great Britain
1924 Paris	Harold Abrahams; Great Britain	Jackson Scholz; United States	Arthur Porritt, Baron Porritt; New Zealand
1928 Amsterdam	Percy Williams; Canada	Jack London (athlete); Great Britain	Georg Lammers; Germany
1932 Los Angeles	Eddie Tolan; United States	Ralph Metcalfe; United States	Arthur Jonath; Germany
1936 Berlin	Jesse Owens; United States	Ralph Metcalfe; United States	Tinus Osendarp; Netherlands
1948 London	Harrison Dillard; United States	Barney Ewell; United States	Lloyd LaBeach; Panama
1952 Helsinki	Lindy Remigino; United States	Herb McKenley; Jamaica	McDonald Bailey; Great Britain
1956 Melbourne	Bobby Morrow; United States	Thane Baker; United States	Hector Hogan; Australia
1960 Rome	Armin Hary; United Team of Germany	Dave Sime; United States	Peter Radford; Great Britain
1964 Tokyo	Bob Hayes; United States	Enrique Figuerola; Cuba	Harry Jerome; Canada
1968 Mexico City	Jim Hines; United States	Lennox Miller; Jamaica	Charles Greene; United States
1972 Munich	Valeriy Borzov; Soviet Union	Robert Taylor; United States	Lennox Miller; Jamaica
1976 Montreal	Hasely Crawford; Trinidad and Tobago	Don Quarrie; Jamaica	Valeriy Borzov; Soviet Union
1980 Moscow	Allan Wells; Great Britain	Silvio Leonard; Cuba	Petar Petrov; Bulgaria
1984 Los Angeles	Carl Lewis; United States	Sam Graddy; United States	Ben Johnson; Canada
1988 Seoul	Carl Lewis; United States	Linford Christie; Great Britain	Calvin Smith; United States
1992 Barcelona	Linford Christie; Great Britain	Frankie Fredericks; Namibia	Dennis Mitchell; United States
1996 Atlanta	Donovan Bailey; Canada	Frankie Fredericks; Namibia	Ato Boldon; Trinidad and Tobago
2000 Sydney	Maurice Greene; United States	Ato Boldon; Trinidad and Tobago	Obadele Thompson; Barbados
2004 Athens	Justin Gatlin; United States	Francis Obikwelu; Portugal	Maurice Greene; United States
2008 Beijing	Usain Bolt; Jamaica	Richard Thompson; Trinidad and Tobago	Walter Dix; United States
2012 London	Usain Bolt; Jamaica	Yohan Blake; Jamaica	Justin Gatlin; United States
2016 Rio de Janeiro	Usain Bolt; Jamaica	Justin Gatlin; United States	Andre De Grasse; Canada
2020 Tokyo	Marcell Jacobs; Italy	Fred Kerley; United States	Andre De Grasse; Canada
2024 Paris	Noah Lyles; United States	Kishane Thompson; Jamaica	Fred Kerley; United States
2028 Los Angeles			

=== 200 metres ===
Games	Gold	Silver	Bronze
1900 Paris	Walter Tewksbury; United States	Norman Pritchard; India	Stan Rowley; Australia
1904 St. Louis	Archie Hahn; United States	Nate Cartmell; United States	William Hogenson; United States
1908 London	Robert Kerr; Canada	Robert Cloughen; United States	Nate Cartmell; United States
1912 Stockholm	Ralph Craig; United States	Donald Lippincott; United States	Willie Applegarth; Great Britain
1920 Antwerp	Allen Woodring; United States	Charley Paddock; United States	Harry Edward; Great Britain
1924 Paris	Jackson Scholz; United States	Charley Paddock; United States	Eric Liddell; Great Britain
1928 Amsterdam	Percy Williams; Canada	Walter Rangeley; Great Britain	Helmut Körnig; Germany
1932 Los Angeles	Eddie Tolan; United States	George Simpson; United States	Ralph Metcalfe; United States
1936 Berlin	Jesse Owens; United States	Mack Robinson; United States	Tinus Osendarp; Netherlands
1948 London	Mel Patton; United States	Barney Ewell; United States	Lloyd LaBeach; Panama
1952 Helsinki	Andy Stanfield; United States	Thane Baker; United States	James Gathers; United States
1956 Melbourne	Bobby Morrow; United States	Andy Stanfield; United States	Thane Baker; United States
1960 Rome	Livio Berruti; Italy	Lester Carney; United States	Abdoulaye Seye; France
1964 Tokyo	Henry Carr; United States	Paul Drayton; United States	Edwin Roberts; Trinidad and Tobago
1968 Mexico City	Tommie Smith; United States	Peter Norman; Australia	John Carlos; United States
1972 Munich	Valeriy Borzov; Soviet Union	Larry Black; United States	Pietro Mennea; Italy
1976 Montreal	Don Quarrie; Jamaica	Millard Hampton; United States	Dwayne Evans; United States
1980 Moscow	Pietro Mennea; Italy	Allan Wells; Great Britain	Don Quarrie; Jamaica
1984 Los Angeles	Carl Lewis; United States	Kirk Baptiste; United States	Thomas Jefferson; United States
1988 Seoul	Joe DeLoach; United States	Carl Lewis; United States	Robson da Silva; Brazil
1992 Barcelona	Michael Marsh; United States	Frankie Fredericks; Namibia	Michael Bates; United States
1996 Atlanta	Michael Johnson; United States	Frankie Fredericks; Namibia	Ato Boldon; Trinidad and Tobago
2000 Sydney	Konstantinos Kenteris; Greece	Darren Campbell; Great Britain	Ato Boldon; Trinidad and Tobago
2004 Athens	Shawn Crawford; United States	Bernard Williams; United States	Justin Gatlin; United States
2008 Beijing	Usain Bolt; Jamaica	Shawn Crawford; United States	Walter Dix; United States
2012 London	Usain Bolt; Jamaica	Yohan Blake; Jamaica	Warren Weir; Jamaica
2016 Rio de Janeiro	Usain Bolt; Jamaica	Andre De Grasse; Canada	Christophe Lemaitre; France
2020 Tokyo	Andre De Grasse; Canada	Kenny Bednarek; United States	Noah Lyles; United States
2024 Paris	Letsile Tebogo; Botswana	Kenny Bednarek; United States	Noah Lyles; United States
2028 Los Angeles			

=== 400 metres ===
Games	Gold	Silver	Bronze
1896 Athens	Thomas Burke; United States	Herbert Jamison; United States	Charles Gmelin; Great Britain
1900 Paris	Maxie Long; United States	William Holland; United States	Ernst Schultz; Denmark
1904 St. Louis	Harry Hillman; United States	Frank Waller; United States	Herman Groman; United States
1908 London	Wyndham Halswelle; Great Britain	None awarded	None awarded
1912 Stockholm	Charles Reidpath; United States	Hanns Braun; Germany	Edward Lindberg; United States
1920 Antwerp	Bevil Rudd; South Africa	Guy Butler; Great Britain	Nils Engdahl; Sweden
1924 Paris	Eric Liddell; Great Britain	Horatio Fitch; United States	Guy Butler; Great Britain
1928 Amsterdam	Ray Barbuti; United States	James Ball; Canada	Joachim Büchner; Germany
1932 Los Angeles	Bill Carr; United States	Ben Eastman; United States	Alex Wilson; Canada
1936 Berlin	Archie Williams; United States	Godfrey Brown; Great Britain	James LuValle; United States
1948 London	Arthur Wint; Jamaica	Herb McKenley; Jamaica	Mal Whitfield; United States
1952 Helsinki	George Rhoden; Jamaica	Herb McKenley; Jamaica	Ollie Matson; United States
1956 Melbourne	Charles Jenkins; United States	Karl-Friedrich Haas; United Team of Germany	Voitto Hellsten; Finland
1956 Melbourne	Charles Jenkins; United States	Karl-Friedrich Haas; United Team of Germany	Ardalion Ignatyev; Soviet Union
1960 Rome	Otis Davis; United States	Carl Kaufmann; United Team of Germany	Malcolm Spence; South Africa
1964 Tokyo	Mike Larrabee; United States	Wendell Mottley; Trinidad and Tobago	Andrzej Badeński; Poland
1968 Mexico City	Lee Evans; United States	Larry James; United States	Ron Freeman; United States
1972 Munich	Vincent Matthews; United States	Wayne Collett; United States	Julius Sang; Kenya
1976 Montreal	Alberto Juantorena; Cuba	Fred Newhouse; United States	Herman Frazier; United States
1980 Moscow	Viktor Markin; Soviet Union	Rick Mitchell; Australia	Frank Schaffer; East Germany
1984 Los Angeles	Alonzo Babers; United States	Gabriel Tiacoh; Ivory Coast	Antonio McKay; United States
1988 Seoul	Steve Lewis; United States	Butch Reynolds; United States	Danny Everett; United States
1992 Barcelona	Quincy Watts; United States	Steve Lewis; United States	Samson Kitur; Kenya
1996 Atlanta	Michael Johnson; United States	Roger Black; Great Britain	Davis Kamoga; Uganda
2000 Sydney	Michael Johnson; United States	Alvin Harrison; United States	Greg Haughton; Jamaica
2004 Athens	Jeremy Wariner; United States	Otis Harris; United States	Derrick Brew; United States
2008 Beijing	LaShawn Merritt; United States	Jeremy Wariner; United States	David Neville; United States
2012 London	Kirani James; Grenada	Luguelín Santos; Dominican Republic	Lalonde Gordon; Trinidad and Tobago
2016 Rio de Janeiro	Wayde van Niekerk; South Africa	Kirani James; Grenada	LaShawn Merritt; United States
2020 Tokyo	Steven Gardiner; Bahamas	Anthony Zambrano; Colombia	Kirani James; Grenada
2024 Paris	Quincy Hall; United States	Matthew Hudson Smith; Great Britain	Muzala Samukonga; Zambia
2028 Los Angeles			

=== 800 metres ===
Games	Gold	Silver	Bronze
1896 Athens	Edwin Flack; Australia	Nándor Dáni; Hungary	Dimitrios Golemis; Greece
1900 Paris	Alfred Tysoe; Great Britain	John Cregan; United States	David Hall; United States
1904 St. Louis	Jim Lightbody; United States	Howard Valentine; United States	Emil Breitkreutz; United States
1908 London	Mel Sheppard; United States	Emilio Lunghi; Italy	Hanns Braun; Germany
1912 Stockholm	Ted Meredith; United States	Mel Sheppard; United States	Ira Davenport; United States
1920 Antwerp	Albert Hill; Great Britain	Earl Eby; United States	Bevil Rudd; South Africa
1924 Paris	Douglas Lowe; Great Britain	Paul Martin; Switzerland	Schuyler Enck; United States
1928 Amsterdam	Douglas Lowe; Great Britain	Erik Byléhn; Sweden	Hermann Engelhard; Germany
1932 Los Angeles	Tommy Hampson; Great Britain	Alex Wilson; Canada	Phil Edwards; Canada
1936 Berlin	John Woodruff; United States	Mario Lanzi; Italy	Phil Edwards; Canada
1948 London	Mal Whitfield; United States	Arthur Wint; Jamaica	Marcel Hansenne; France
1952 Helsinki	Mal Whitfield; United States	Arthur Wint; Jamaica	Heinz Ulzheimer; Germany
1956 Melbourne	Tom Courtney; United States	Derek Johnson; Great Britain	Audun Boysen; Norway
1960 Rome	Peter Snell; New Zealand	Roger Moens; Belgium	George Kerr; British West Indies
1964 Tokyo	Peter Snell; New Zealand	Bill Crothers; Canada	Wilson Kiprugut; Kenya
1968 Mexico City	Ralph Doubell; Australia	Wilson Kiprugut; Kenya	Tom Farrell; United States
1972 Munich	Dave Wottle; United States	Yevhen Arzhanov; Soviet Union	Mike Boit; Kenya
1976 Montreal	Alberto Juantorena; Cuba	Ivo Van Damme; Belgium	Rick Wohlhuter; United States
1980 Moscow	Steve Ovett; Great Britain	Sebastian Coe; Great Britain	Nikolay Kirov; Soviet Union
1984 Los Angeles	Joaquim Cruz; Brazil	Sebastian Coe; Great Britain	Earl Jones; United States
1988 Seoul	Paul Ereng; Kenya	Joaquim Cruz; Brazil	Saïd Aouita; Morocco
1992 Barcelona	William Tanui; Kenya	Nixon Kiprotich; Kenya	Johnny Gray; United States
1996 Atlanta	Vebjørn Rodal; Norway	Hezekiél Sepeng; South Africa	Frederick Onyancha; Kenya
2000 Sydney	Nils Schumann; Germany	Wilson Kipketer; Denmark	Djabir Saïd-Guerni; Algeria
2004 Athens	Yuriy Borzakovskiy; Russia	Mbulaeni Mulaudzi; South Africa	Wilson Kipketer; Denmark
2008 Beijing	Wilfred Bungei; Kenya	Ismail Ahmed Ismail; Sudan	Alfred Kirwa Yego; Kenya
2012 London	David Rudisha; Kenya	Nijel Amos; Botswana	Timothy Kitum; Kenya
2016 Rio de Janeiro	David Rudisha; Kenya	Taoufik Makhloufi; Algeria	Clayton Murphy; United States
2020 Tokyo	Emmanuel Korir; Kenya	Ferguson Rotich; Kenya	Patryk Dobek; Poland
2024 Paris	Emmanuel Wanyonyi; Kenya	Marco Arop; Canada	Djamel Sedjati; Algeria
2028 Los Angeles			

=== 1500 metres ===
Games	Gold	Silver	Bronze
1896 Athens	Edwin Flack; Australia	Arthur Blake; United States	Albin Lermusiaux; France
1900 Paris	Charles Bennett; Great Britain	Henri Deloge; France	John Bray; United States
1904 St. Louis	Jim Lightbody; United States	Frank Verner; United States	Lacey Hearn; United States
1908 London	Mel Sheppard; United States	Harold Wilson; Great Britain	Norman Hallows; Great Britain
1912 Stockholm	Arnold Jackson; Great Britain	Abel Kiviat; United States	Norman Taber; United States
1920 Antwerp	Albert Hill; Great Britain	Philip Baker; Great Britain	Lawrence Shields; United States
1924 Paris	Paavo Nurmi; Finland	Willy Schärer; Switzerland	H. B. Stallard; Great Britain
1928 Amsterdam	Harri Larva; Finland	Jules Ladoumègue; France	Eino Purje; Finland
1932 Los Angeles	Luigi Beccali; Italy	Jerry Cornes; Great Britain	Phil Edwards; Canada
1936 Berlin	Jack Lovelock; New Zealand	Glenn Cunningham; United States	Luigi Beccali; Italy
1948 London	Henry Eriksson; Sweden	Lennart Strand; Sweden	Willem Slijkhuis; Netherlands
1952 Helsinki	Josy Barthel; Luxembourg	Bob McMillen; United States	Werner Lueg; Germany
1956 Melbourne	Ron Delany; Ireland	Klaus Richtzenhain; United Team of Germany	John Landy; Australia
1960 Rome	Herb Elliott; Australia	Michel Jazy; France	István Rózsavölgyi; Hungary
1964 Tokyo	Peter Snell; New Zealand	Josef Odložil; Czechoslovakia	John Davies; New Zealand
1968 Mexico City	Kipchoge Keino; Kenya	Jim Ryun; United States	Bodo Tümmler; West Germany
1972 Munich	Pekka Vasala; Finland	Kipchoge Keino; Kenya	Rod Dixon; New Zealand
1976 Montreal	John Walker; New Zealand	Ivo Van Damme; Belgium	Paul-Heinz Wellmann; West Germany
1980 Moscow	Sebastian Coe; Great Britain	Jürgen Straub; East Germany	Steve Ovett; Great Britain
1984 Los Angeles	Sebastian Coe; Great Britain	Steve Cram; Great Britain	José Manuel Abascal; Spain
1988 Seoul	Peter Rono; Kenya	Peter Elliott; Great Britain	Jens-Peter Herold; East Germany
1992 Barcelona	Fermín Cacho; Spain	Rachid El Basir; Morocco	Mohamed Suleiman; Qatar
1996 Atlanta	Noureddine Morceli; Algeria	Fermín Cacho; Spain	Stephen Kipkorir; Kenya
2000 Sydney	Noah Ngeny; Kenya	Hicham El Guerrouj; Morocco	Bernard Lagat; Kenya
2004 Athens	Hicham El Guerrouj; Morocco	Bernard Lagat; Kenya	Rui Silva; Portugal
2008 Beijing	Asbel Kiprop; Kenya	Nick Willis; New Zealand	Mehdi Baala; France
2012 London	Taoufik Makhloufi; Algeria	Leonel Manzano; United States	Abdalaati Iguider; Morocco
2016 Rio de Janeiro	Matthew Centrowitz Jr. United States	Taoufik Makhloufi; Algeria	Nick Willis; New Zealand
2020 Tokyo	Jakob Ingebrigtsen; Norway	Timothy Cheruiyot; Kenya	Josh Kerr; Great Britain
2024 Paris	Cole Hocker; United States	Josh Kerr; Great Britain	Yared Nuguse; United States
2028 Los Angeles			

=== 5000 metres ===
Games	Gold	Silver	Bronze
1912 Stockholm	Hannes Kolehmainen; Finland	Jean Bouin; France	George Hutson; Great Britain
1920 Antwerp	Joseph Guillemot; France	Paavo Nurmi; Finland	Eric Backman; Sweden
1924 Paris	Paavo Nurmi; Finland	Ville Ritola; Finland	Edvin Wide; Sweden
1928 Amsterdam	Ville Ritola; Finland	Paavo Nurmi; Finland	Edvin Wide; Sweden
1932 Los Angeles	Lauri Lehtinen; Finland	Ralph Hill; United States	Lauri Virtanen; Finland
1936 Berlin	Gunnar Höckert; Finland	Lauri Lehtinen; Finland	Henry Jonsson; Sweden
1948 London	Gaston Reiff; Belgium	Emil Zátopek; Czechoslovakia	Willem Slijkhuis; Netherlands
1952 Helsinki	Emil Zátopek; Czechoslovakia	Alain Mimoun; France	Herbert Schade; Germany
1956 Melbourne	Vladimir Kuts; Soviet Union	Gordon Pirie; Great Britain	Derek Ibbotson; Great Britain
1960 Rome	Murray Halberg; New Zealand	Hans Grodotzki; United Team of Germany	Kazimierz Zimny; Poland
1964 Tokyo	Bob Schul; United States	Harald Norpoth; United Team of Germany	Bill Dellinger; United States
1968 Mexico City	Mohammed Gammoudi; Tunisia	Kipchoge Keino; Kenya	Naftali Temu; Kenya
1972 Munich	Lasse Virén; Finland	Mohammed Gammoudi; Tunisia	Ian Stewart; Great Britain
1976 Montreal	Lasse Virén; Finland	Dick Quax; New Zealand	Klaus-Peter Hildenbrand; West Germany
1980 Moscow	Miruts Yifter; Ethiopia	Suleiman Nyambui; Tanzania	Kaarlo Maaninka; Finland
1984 Los Angeles	Saïd Aouita; Morocco	Markus Ryffel; Switzerland	António Leitão; Portugal
1988 Seoul	John Ngugi; Kenya	Dieter Baumann; West Germany	Hansjörg Kunze; East Germany
1992 Barcelona	Dieter Baumann; Germany	Paul Bitok; Kenya	Fita Bayisa; Ethiopia
1996 Atlanta	Vénuste Niyongabo; Burundi	Paul Bitok; Kenya	Khalid Boulami; Morocco
2000 Sydney	Million Wolde; Ethiopia	Ali Saïdi-Sief; Algeria	Brahim Lahlafi; Morocco
2004 Athens	Hicham El Guerrouj; Morocco	Kenenisa Bekele; Ethiopia	Eliud Kipchoge; Kenya
2008 Beijing	Kenenisa Bekele; Ethiopia	Eliud Kipchoge; Kenya	Edwin Soi; Kenya
2012 London	Mo Farah; Great Britain	Dejen Gebremeskel; Ethiopia	Thomas Longosiwa; Kenya
2016 Rio de Janeiro	Mo Farah; Great Britain	Paul Chelimo; United States	Hagos Gebrhiwet; Ethiopia
2020 Tokyo	Joshua Cheptegei; Uganda	Mohammed Ahmed; Canada	Paul Chelimo; United States
2024 Paris	Jakob Ingebrigtsen; Norway	Ronald Kwemoi; Kenya	Grant Fisher; United States
2028 Los Angeles			

=== 10,000 metres ===
Games	Gold	Silver	Bronze
1912 Stockholm	Hannes Kolehmainen; Finland	Lewis Tewanima; United States	Albin Stenroos; Finland
1920 Antwerp	Paavo Nurmi; Finland	Joseph Guillemot; France	James Wilson; Great Britain
1924 Paris	Ville Ritola; Finland	Edvin Wide; Sweden	Eero Berg; Finland
1928 Amsterdam	Paavo Nurmi; Finland	Ville Ritola; Finland	Edvin Wide; Sweden
1932 Los Angeles	Janusz Kusociński; Poland	Volmari Iso-Hollo; Finland	Lasse Virtanen; Finland
1936 Berlin	Ilmari Salminen; Finland	Arvo Askola; Finland	Volmari Iso-Hollo; Finland
1948 London	Emil Zátopek; Czechoslovakia	Alain Mimoun; France	Bertil Albertsson; Sweden
1952 Helsinki	Emil Zátopek; Czechoslovakia	Alain Mimoun; France	Aleksandr Anufriyev; Soviet Union
1956 Melbourne	Vladimir Kuts; Soviet Union	József Kovács; Hungary	Al Lawrence; Australia
1960 Rome	Pyotr Bolotnikov; Soviet Union	Hans Grodotzki; United Team of Germany	Dave Power; Australia
1964 Tokyo	Billy Mills; United States	Mohammed Gammoudi; Tunisia	Ron Clarke; Australia
1968 Mexico City	Naftali Temu; Kenya	Mamo Wolde; Ethiopia	Mohammed Gammoudi; Tunisia
1972 Munich	Lasse Virén; Finland	Emiel Puttemans; Belgium	Miruts Yifter; Ethiopia
1976 Montreal	Lasse Virén; Finland	Carlos Lopes; Portugal	Brendan Foster; Great Britain
1980 Moscow	Miruts Yifter; Ethiopia	Kaarlo Maaninka; Finland	Mohamed Kedir; Ethiopia
1984 Los Angeles	Alberto Cova; Italy	Mike McLeod; Great Britain	Michael Musyoki; Kenya
1988 Seoul	Brahim Boutayeb; Morocco	Salvatore Antibo; Italy	Kipkemboi Kimeli; Kenya
1992 Barcelona	Khalid Skah; Morocco	Richard Chelimo; Kenya	Addis Abebe; Ethiopia
1996 Atlanta	Haile Gebrselassie; Ethiopia	Paul Tergat; Kenya	Saleh Hissou; Morocco
2000 Sydney	Haile Gebrselassie; Ethiopia	Paul Tergat; Kenya	Assefa Mezgebu; Ethiopia
2004 Athens	Kenenisa Bekele; Ethiopia	Sileshi Sihine; Ethiopia	Zersenay Tadese; Eritrea
2008 Beijing	Kenenisa Bekele; Ethiopia	Sileshi Sihine; Ethiopia	Micah Kogo; Kenya
2012 London	Mo Farah; Great Britain	Galen Rupp; United States	Tariku Bekele; Ethiopia
2016 Rio de Janeiro	Mo Farah; Great Britain	Paul Tanui; Kenya	Tamirat Tola; Ethiopia
2020 Tokyo	Selemon Barega; Ethiopia	Joshua Cheptegei; Uganda	Jacob Kiplimo; Uganda
2024 Paris	Joshua Cheptegei; Uganda	Berihu Aregawi; Ethiopia	Grant Fisher; United States
2028 Los Angeles			

=== Marathon ===
The distance of the marathon at the Olympics has varied in the early years, before being standardized at 42,195 m in 1924, the distance that was run at the 1908 Olympics. In other years, the distances have been:

- 1896: 40,000 m (approximately)
- 1900: 40,260 m (25.02 mi)
- 1904: 40,000 m (24.85 mi)
- 1912: 40,200 m (24.98 mi)
- 1920: 40,750 m (25.32 mi)

Games	Gold		Silver		Bronze	
1896 Athens	Spyridon Louis; Greece	2:58:50	Charilaos Vasilakos; Greece	3:06:03	Gyula Kellner; Hungary	3:06:35
1900 Paris	Michel Théato; France	2:59:45	Émile Champion; France	3:04:17	Ernst Fast; Sweden	3:37:14
1904 St. Louis	Thomas Hicks; United States	3:28:53	Albert Corey; United States	3:34:52	Arthur Newton; United States	3:47:33
1908 London	Johnny Hayes; United States	2:55:18.4	Charles Hefferon; South Africa	2:56:06.0	Joseph Forshaw; United States	2:57:10.4
1912 Stockholm	Ken McArthur; South Africa	2:36:54.8	Christian Gitsham; South Africa	2:37:52.0	Gaston Strobino; United States	2:38:42.4
1920 Antwerp	Hannes Kolehmainen; Finland	2:32:35.8	Jüri Lossmann; Estonia	2:32:48.6	Valerio Arri; Italy	2:36:32.8
1924 Paris	Albin Stenroos; Finland	2:41:22.6	Romeo Bertini; Italy	2:47:19.6	Clarence DeMar; United States	2:48:14.0
1928 Amsterdam	Boughera El Ouafi; France	2:32:57	Manuel Plaza; Chile	2:33:23	Martti Marttelin; Finland	2:35:02
1932 Los Angeles	Juan Carlos Zabala; Argentina	2:31:36	Sam Ferris; Great Britain	2:31:55	Armas Toivonen; Finland	2:32:12
1936 Berlin	Sohn Kee-chung; Japan	2:29:19.2	Ernest Harper; Great Britain	2:31:23.2	Nam Sung-yong; Japan	2:31:42.0
1948 London	Delfo Cabrera; Argentina	2:34:51.6	Tom Richards; Great Britain	2:35:07.6	Étienne Gailly; Belgium	2:35:33.6
1952 Helsinki	Emil Zátopek; Czechoslovakia	2:23:03.2	Reinaldo Gorno; Argentina	2:25:35.0	Gustaf Jansson; Sweden	2:26:07.0
1956 Melbourne	Alain Mimoun; France	2:25:00	Franjo Mihalić; Yugoslavia	2:26:32	Veikko Karvonen; Finland	2:27:47
1960 Rome	Abebe Bikila; Ethiopia	2:15:16.2	Rhadi Ben Abdesselam; Morocco	2:15:41.6	Barry Magee; New Zealand	2:17:18.2
1964 Tokyo	Abebe Bikila; Ethiopia	2:12:11.2	Basil Heatley; Great Britain	2:16:19.2	Kōkichi Tsuburaya; Japan	2:16:22.8
1968 Mexico City	Mamo Wolde; Ethiopia	2:20:26	Kenji Kimihara; Japan	2:23:31	Mike Ryan; New Zealand	2:23:45
1972 Munich	Frank Shorter; United States	2:12:19	Karel Lismont; Belgium	2:14:31	Mamo Wolde; Ethiopia	2:15:08
1976 Montreal	Waldemar Cierpinski; East Germany	2:09:55	Frank Shorter; United States	2:10:45	Karel Lismont; Belgium	2:11:12
1980 Moscow	Waldemar Cierpinski; East Germany	2:11:03	Gerard Nijboer; Netherlands	2:11:20	Satymkul Dzhumanazarov; Soviet Union	2:11:35
1984 Los Angeles	Carlos Lopes; Portugal	2:09:21	John Treacy; Ireland	2:09:56	Charlie Spedding; Great Britain	2:09:58
1988 Seoul	Gelindo Bordin; Italy	2:10:32	Douglas Wakiihuri; Kenya	2:10:47	Ahmed Salah; Djibouti	2:10:59
1992 Barcelona	Hwang Young-cho; South Korea	2:13:23	Kōichi Morishita; Japan	2:13:45	Stephan Freigang; Germany	2:14:00
1996 Atlanta	Josia Thugwane; South Africa	2:12:36	Lee Bong-ju; South Korea	2:12:39	Erick Wainaina; Kenya	2:12:44
2000 Sydney	Gezahegne Abera; Ethiopia	2:10:11	Erick Wainaina; Kenya	2:10:31	Tesfaye Tola; Ethiopia	2:11:10
2004 Athens	Stefano Baldini; Italy	2:10:55	Meb Keflezighi; United States	2:11:29	Vanderlei de Lima; Brazil	2:12:11
2008 Beijing	Samuel Wanjiru; Kenya	2:06:32	Jaouad Gharib; Morocco	2:07:16	Tsegay Kebede; Ethiopia	2:10:00
2012 London	Stephen Kiprotich; Uganda	2:08:01	Abel Kirui; Kenya	2:08:27	Wilson Kipsang Kiprotich; Kenya	2:09:37
2016 Rio de Janeiro	Eliud Kipchoge; Kenya	2:08:44	Feyisa Lelisa; Ethiopia	2:09:54	Galen Rupp; United States	2:10:05
2020 Tokyo	Eliud Kipchoge; Kenya	2:08:38	Abdi Nageeye; Netherlands	2:09:58	Bashir Abdi; Belgium	2:10:00
2024 Paris	Tamirat Tola; Ethiopia	2:06:26	Bashir Abdi; Belgium	2:06:47	Benson Kipruto; Kenya	2:07:00
2028 Los Angeles						

=== Half marathon race walk ===
Games	Gold	Silver	Bronze
2028 Los Angeles			

=== 110 metres hurdles ===
Games	Gold	Silver	Bronze
1896 Athens	Thomas Curtis; United States	Grantley Goulding; Great Britain	none awarded
1900 Paris	Alvin Kraenzlein; United States	John McLean; United States	Fred Moloney; United States
1904 St. Louis	Frederick Schule; United States	Thaddeus Shideler; United States	Lesley Ashburner; United States
1908 London	Forrest Smithson; United States	John Garrels; United States	Arthur Shaw; United States
1912 Stockholm	Fred Kelly; United States	James Wendell; United States	Martin Hawkins; United States
1920 Antwerp	Earl Thomson; Canada	Harold Barron; United States	Feg Murray; United States
1924 Paris	Daniel Kinsey; United States	Sid Atkinson; South Africa	Sten Pettersson; Sweden
1928 Amsterdam	Sid Atkinson; South Africa	Steve Anderson; United States	John Collier; United States
1932 Los Angeles	George Saling; United States	Percy Beard; United States	Don Finlay; Great Britain
1936 Berlin	Forrest Towns; United States	Don Finlay; Great Britain	Fritz Pollard; United States
1948 London	William Porter; United States	Clyde Scott; United States	Craig Dixon; United States
1952 Helsinki	Harrison Dillard; United States	Jack Davis; United States	Arthur Barnard; United States
1956 Melbourne	Lee Calhoun; United States	Jack Davis; United States	Joel Shankle; United States
1960 Rome	Lee Calhoun; United States	Willie May; United States	Hayes Jones; United States
1964 Tokyo	Hayes Jones; United States	Blaine Lindgren; United States	Anatoly Mikhailov; Soviet Union
1968 Mexico City	Willie Davenport; United States	Ervin Hall; United States	Eddy Ottoz; Italy
1972 Munich	Rod Milburn; United States	Guy Drut; France	Thomas Hill; United States
1976 Montreal	Guy Drut; France	Alejandro Casañas; Cuba	Willie Davenport; United States
1980 Moscow	Thomas Munkelt; East Germany	Alejandro Casañas; Cuba	Aleksandr Puchkov; Soviet Union
1984 Los Angeles	Roger Kingdom; United States	Greg Foster; United States	Arto Bryggare; Finland
1988 Seoul	Roger Kingdom; United States	Colin Jackson; Great Britain	Tonie Campbell; United States
1992 Barcelona	Mark McKoy; Canada	Tony Dees; United States	Jack Pierce; United States
1996 Atlanta	Allen Johnson; United States	Mark Crear; United States	Florian Schwarthoff; Germany
2000 Sydney	Anier García; Cuba	Terrence Trammell; United States	Mark Crear; United States
2004 Athens	Liu Xiang; China	Terrence Trammell; United States	Anier García; Cuba
2008 Beijing	Dayron Robles; Cuba	David Payne; United States	David Oliver; United States
2012 London	Aries Merritt; United States	Jason Richardson; United States	Hansle Parchment; Jamaica
2016 Rio de Janeiro	Omar McLeod; Jamaica	Orlando Ortega; Spain	Dimitri Bascou; France
2020 Tokyo	Hansle Parchment; Jamaica	Grant Holloway; United States	Ronald Levy; Jamaica
2024 Paris	Grant Holloway; United States	Daniel Roberts; United States	Rasheed Broadbell; Jamaica
2028 Los Angeles			

=== 400 metres hurdles ===
Games	Gold	Silver	Bronze
1900 Paris	Walter Tewksbury; United States	Henri Tauzin; France	George Orton; United States
1904 St. Louis	Harry Hillman; United States	Frank Waller; United States	George Poage; United States
1908 London	Charles Bacon; United States	Harry Hillman; United States	Jimmy Tremeer; Great Britain
1912 Stockholm	not included in the Olympic program		
1920 Antwerp	Frank Loomis; United States	John Norton; United States	August Desch; United States
1924 Paris	Morgan Taylor; United States	Erik Wilén; Finland	Ivan Riley; United States
1928 Amsterdam	David Burghley; Great Britain	Frank Cuhel; United States	Morgan Taylor; United States
1932 Los Angeles	Bob Tisdall; Ireland	Glenn Hardin; United States	Morgan Taylor; United States
1936 Berlin	Glenn Hardin; United States	John Loaring; Canada	Miguel White; Philippines
1948 London	Roy Cochran; United States	Duncan White; Ceylon	Rune Larsson; Sweden
1952 Helsinki	Charles Moore; United States	Yuriy Lituyev; Soviet Union	John Holland; New Zealand
1956 Melbourne	Glenn Davis; United States	Eddie Southern; United States	Josh Culbreath; United States
1960 Rome	Glenn Davis; United States	Clifton Cushman; United States	Dick Howard; United States
1964 Tokyo	Rex Cawley; United States	John Cooper; Great Britain	Salvatore Morale; Italy
1968 Mexico City	David Hemery; Great Britain	Gerhard Hennige; West Germany	John Sherwood; Great Britain
1972 Munich	John Akii-Bua; Uganda	Ralph Mann; United States	David Hemery; Great Britain
1976 Montreal	Edwin Moses; United States	Michael Shine; United States	Yevgeniy Gavrilenko; Soviet Union
1980 Moscow	Volker Beck; East Germany	Vasyl Arkhypenko; Soviet Union	Gary Oakes; Great Britain
1984 Los Angeles	Edwin Moses; United States	Danny Harris; United States	Harald Schmid; West Germany
1988 Seoul	André Phillips; United States	Amadou Dia Ba; Senegal	Edwin Moses; United States
1992 Barcelona	Kevin Young; United States	Winthrop Graham; Jamaica	Kriss Akabusi; Great Britain
1996 Atlanta	Derrick Adkins; United States	Samuel Matete; Zambia	Calvin Davis; United States
2000 Sydney	Angelo Taylor; United States	Hadi Al-Somaily; Saudi Arabia	Llewellyn Herbert; South Africa
2004 Athens	Félix Sánchez; Dominican Republic	Danny McFarlane; Jamaica	Naman Keïta; France
2008 Beijing	Angelo Taylor; United States	Kerron Clement; United States	Bershawn Jackson; United States
2012 London	Félix Sánchez; Dominican Republic	Michael Tinsley; United States	Javier Culson; Puerto Rico
2016 Rio de Janeiro	Kerron Clement; United States	Boniface Mucheru Tumuti; Kenya	Yasmani Copello; Turkey
2020 Tokyo	Karsten Warholm; Norway	Rai Benjamin; United States	Alison dos Santos; Brazil
2024 Paris	Rai Benjamin; United States	Karsten Warholm; Norway	Alison dos Santos; Brazil
2028 Los Angeles			

=== 3000 metres steeplechase ===
Games	Gold	Silver	Bronze
1920 Antwerp	Percy Hodge; Great Britain	Patrick Flynn; United States	Ernesto Ambrosini; Italy
1924 Paris	Ville Ritola; Finland	Elias Katz; Finland	Paul Bontemps; France
1928 Amsterdam	Toivo Loukola; Finland	Paavo Nurmi; Finland	Ove Andersen; Finland
1932 Los Angeles	Volmari Iso-Hollo; Finland	Thomas Evenson; Great Britain	Joe McCluskey; United States
1936 Berlin	Volmari Iso-Hollo; Finland	Kalle Tuominen; Finland	Alfred Dompert; Germany
1948 London	Tore Sjöstrand; Sweden	Erik Elmsäter; Sweden	Göte Hagström; Sweden
1952 Helsinki	Horace Ashenfelter; United States	Vladimir Kazantsev; Soviet Union	John Disley; Great Britain
1956 Melbourne	Chris Brasher; Great Britain	Sándor Rozsnyói; Hungary	Ernst Larsen; Norway
1960 Rome	Zdzisław Krzyszkowiak; Poland	Nikolay Sokolov; Soviet Union	Semyon Rzhishchin; Soviet Union
1964 Tokyo	Gaston Roelants; Belgium	Maurice Herriott; Great Britain	Ivan Belyayev; Soviet Union
1968 Mexico City	Amos Biwott; Kenya	Benjamin Kogo; Kenya	George Young; United States
1972 Munich	Kipchoge Keino; Kenya	Ben Jipcho; Kenya	Tapio Kantanen; Finland
1976 Montreal	Anders Gärderud; Sweden	Bronisław Malinowski; Poland	Frank Baumgartl; East Germany
1980 Moscow	Bronisław Malinowski; Poland	Filbert Bayi; Tanzania	Eshetu Tura; Ethiopia
1984 Los Angeles	Julius Korir; Kenya	Joseph Mahmoud; France	Brian Diemer; United States
1988 Seoul	Julius Kariuki; Kenya	Peter Koech; Kenya	Mark Rowland; Great Britain
1992 Barcelona	Matthew Birir; Kenya	Patrick Sang; Kenya	William Mutwol; Kenya
1996 Atlanta	Joseph Keter; Kenya	Moses Kiptanui; Kenya	Alessandro Lambruschini; Italy
2000 Sydney	Reuben Kosgei; Kenya	Wilson Boit Kipketer; Kenya	Ali Ezzine; Morocco
2004 Athens	Ezekiel Kemboi; Kenya	Brimin Kipruto; Kenya	Paul Kipsiele Koech; Kenya
2008 Beijing	Brimin Kipruto; Kenya	Mahiedine Mekhissi-Benabbad; France	Richard Mateelong; Kenya
2012 London	Ezekiel Kemboi; Kenya	Mahiedine Mekhissi-Benabbad; France	Abel Mutai; Kenya
2016 Rio de Janeiro	Conseslus Kipruto; Kenya	Evan Jager; United States	Mahiedine Mekhissi-Benabbad; France
2020 Tokyo	Soufiane El Bakkali; Morocco	Lamecha Girma; Ethiopia	Benjamin Kigen; Kenya
2024 Paris	Soufiane El Bakkali; Morocco	Kenneth Rooks; United States	Abraham Kibiwot; Kenya
2028 Los Angeles			

=== 4 × 100 metres relay ===
Games	Gold	Silver	Bronze
1912 Stockholm	Great Britain; David Jacobs; Henry Macintosh; Victor d'Arcy; Willie Applegarth	Sweden; Ivan Möller; Charles Luther; Ture Persson; Knut Lindberg	none awarded
1920 Antwerp	United States; Charley Paddock; Jackson Scholz; Loren Murchison; Morris Kirksey	France; René Lorain; René Tirard; René Mourlon; Émile Ali-Khan	Sweden; Agne Holmström; William Petersson; Sven Malm; Nils Sandström
1924 Paris	United States; Loren Murchison; Louis Clarke; Frank Hussey; Al LeConey	Great Britain; Harold Abrahams; Walter Rangeley; Wilfred Nichol; Lancelot Royle	Netherlands; Jan de Vries; Jaap Boot; Harry Broos; Rinus van den Berge
1928 Amsterdam	United States; Frank Wykoff; James Quinn; Charley Borah; Henry Russell	Germany; Georg Lammers; Richard Corts; Hubert Houben; Helmut Körnig	Great Britain; Cyril Gill; Edward Smouha; Walter Rangeley; Jack London
1932 Los Angeles	United States; Bob Kiesel; Emmett Toppino; Hector Dyer; Frank Wykoff	Germany; Helmut Körnig; Friedrich Hendrix; Erich Borchmeyer; Arthur Jonath	Italy; Giuseppe Castelli; Ruggero Maregatti; Gabriele Salviati; Edgardo Toetti
1936 Berlin	United States; Jesse Owens; Ralph Metcalfe; Foy Draper; Frank Wykoff	Italy; Orazio Mariani; Gianni Caldana; Elio Ragni; Tullio Gonnelli	Germany; Wilhelm Leichum; Erich Borchmeyer; Erwin Gillmeister; Gerd Hornberger
1948 London	United States; Barney Ewell; Lorenzo Wright; Harrison Dillard; Mel Patton	Great Britain; Jack Archer; Jack Gregory; Alastair McCorquodale; Kenneth Jones	Italy; Michele Tito; Enrico Perucconi; Antonio Siddi; Carlo Monti
1952 Helsinki	United States; Dean Smith; Harrison Dillard; Lindy Remigino; Andy Stanfield	Soviet Union; Boris Tokarev; Levan Kalyayev; Levan Sanadze; Vladimir Sukharev	Hungary; László Zarándi; Géza Varasdi; György Csányi; Béla Goldoványi
1956 Melbourne	United States; Ira Murchison; Leamon King; Thane Baker; Bobby Morrow	Soviet Union; Leonid Bartenyev; Boris Tokarev; Yuriy Konovalov; Vladimir Sukharev	United Team of Germany; Lothar Knörzer; Leonhard Pohl; Heinz Fütterer; Manfred Germar
1960 Rome	United Team of Germany; Bernd Cullmann; Armin Hary; Walter Mahlendorf; Martin Lauer	Soviet Union; Gusman Kosanov; Leonid Bartenyev; Yuriy Konovalov; Edvin Ozolin	Great Britain; Peter Radford; David Jones; David Segal; Nick Whitehead
1964 Tokyo	United States; Paul Drayton; Gerry Ashworth; Richard Stebbins; Bob Hayes	Poland; Andrzej Zieliński; Wiesław Maniak; Marian Foik; Marian Dudziak	France; Paul Genevay; Bernard Laidebeur; Claude Piquemal; Jocelyn Delecour
1968 Mexico City	United States; Charles Greene; Mel Pender; Ronnie Ray Smith; Jim Hines	Cuba; Hermes Ramírez; Juan Morales; Pablo Montes; Enrique Figuerola	France; Gérard Fenouil; Jocelyn Delecour; Claude Piquemal; Roger Bambuck
1972 Munich	United States; Larry Black; Robert Taylor; Gerald Tinker; Eddie Hart	Soviet Union; Aleksandr Kornelyuk; Vladimir Lovetskiy; Juris Silovs; Valeriy Borzov	West Germany; Jobst Hirscht; Karlheinz Klotz; Gerhard Wucherer; Klaus Ehl
1976 Montreal	United States; Harvey Glance; Lam Jones; Millard Hampton; Steve Riddick	East Germany; Manfred Kokot; Jörg Pfeifer; Klaus-Dieter Kurrat; Alexander Thieme	Soviet Union; Aleksandr Aksinin; Nikolay Kolesnikov; Juris Silovs; Valeriy Borzov
1980 Moscow	Soviet Union; Vladimir Muravyov; Nikolay Sidorov; Aleksandr Aksinin; Andrey Prokofyev	Poland; Krzysztof Zwoliński; Zenon Licznerski; Leszek Dunecki; Marian Woronin	France; Antoine Richard; Pascal Barré; Patrick Barré; Hermann Panzo
1984 Los Angeles	United States; Sam Graddy; Ron Brown; Calvin Smith; Carl Lewis	Jamaica; Albert Lawrence; Greg Meghoo; Don Quarrie; Ray Stewart	Canada; Ben Johnson; Tony Sharpe; Desai Williams; Sterling Hinds
1988 Seoul	Soviet Union; Viktor Bryzhin; Vladimir Krylov; Vladimir Muravyov; Vitaliy Savin	Great Britain; Elliot Bunney; John Regis; Mike McFarlane; Linford Christie	France; Bruno Marie-Rose; Daniel Sangouma; Gilles Quénéhervé; Max Morinière
1992 Barcelona	United States; Michael Marsh; Leroy Burrell; Dennis Mitchell; Carl Lewis; James Jett*	Nigeria; Oluyemi Kayode; Chidi Imoh; Olapade Adeniken; Davidson Ezinwa; Osmond Ezinwa*	Cuba; Andrés Simón; Joel Lamela; Joel Isasi; Jorge Aguilera
1996 Atlanta	Canada; Robert Esmie; Glenroy Gilbert; Bruny Surin; Donovan Bailey; Carlton Chambers*	United States; Jon Drummond; Tim Harden; Michael Marsh; Dennis Mitchell; Tim Montgomery*	Brazil; Arnaldo da Silva; Robson da Silva; Édson Ribeiro; André Domingos
2000 Sydney	United States; Jon Drummond; Bernard Williams; Brian Lewis; Maurice Greene; Tim Montgomery*; Kenny Brokenburr*	Brazil; Vicente de Lima; Édson Ribeiro; André Domingos; Claudinei da Silva; Cláudio Roberto Souza	Cuba; José Ángel César; Luis Alberto Pérez-Rionda; Ivan García; Freddy Mayola
2004 Athens	Great Britain; Jason Gardener; Darren Campbell; Marlon Devonish; Mark Lewis-Francis	United States; Shawn Crawford; Justin Gatlin; Coby Miller; Maurice Greene; Darvis Patton*	Nigeria; Olusoji Fasuba; Uchenna Emedolu; Aaron Egbele; Deji Aliu
2008 Beijing	Trinidad and Tobago; Keston Bledman; Marc Burns; Emmanuel Callender; Richard Thompson; Aaron Armstrong*	Japan; Naoki Tsukahara; Shingo Suetsugu; Shinji Takahira; Nobuharu Asahara	Brazil; Vicente de Lima; Sandro Viana; Bruno de Barros; José Carlos Moreira
2012 London	Jamaica; Nesta Carter; Michael Frater; Yohan Blake; Usain Bolt; Kemar Bailey-Cole*	Trinidad and Tobago; Richard Thompson; Marc Burns; Emmanuel Callender; Keston Bledman	France; Jimmy Vicaut; Christophe Lemaitre; Pierre-Alexis Pessonneaux; Ronald Pognon
2016 Rio de Janeiro	Jamaica; Asafa Powell; Yohan Blake; Nickel Ashmeade; Usain Bolt; Jevaughn Minzie*; Kemar Bailey-Cole*	Japan; Ryota Yamagata; Shōta Iizuka; Yoshihide Kiryū; Asuka Cambridge	Canada; Akeem Haynes; Aaron Brown; Brendon Rodney; Andre De Grasse; Bolade Ajomale*
2020 Tokyo	Italy; Lorenzo Patta; Marcell Jacobs; Fausto Desalu; Filippo Tortu	Canada; Aaron Brown; Jerome Blake; Brendon Rodney; Andre De Grasse	China; Tang Xingqiang; Xie Zhenye; Su Bingtian; Wu Zhiqiang
2024 Paris	Canada; Aaron Brown; Jerome Blake; Brendon Rodney; Andre De Grasse	South Africa; Bayanda Walaza; Shaun Maswanganyi; Bradley Nkoana; Akani Simbine	Great Britain; Jeremiah Azu; Louie Hinchliffe; Nethaneel Mitchell-Blake; Zharnel Hughes; Richard Kilty*
2028 Los Angeles			

Note: * Indicates athletes who ran in preliminary rounds and also received medals.

=== 4 × 400 metres relay ===
Games	Gold	Silver	Bronze
1912 Stockholm	United States; Mel Sheppard; Edward Lindberg; Ted Meredith; Charles Reidpath	France; Charles Lelong; Robert Schurrer; Pierre Failliot; Charles Poulenard	Great Britain; George Nicol; Ernest Henley; James Soutter; Cyril Seedhouse
1920 Antwerp	Great Britain; Cecil Griffiths; Robert Lindsay; John Ainsworth-Davis; Guy Butler	South Africa; Henry Dafel; Clarence Oldfield; Jack Oosterlaak; Bevil Rudd	France; Géo André; Gaston Féry; Maurice Delvart; André Devaux
1924 Paris	United States; Commodore Cochran; Alan Helffrich; Oliver Macdonald; William Stevenson	Sweden; Artur Svensson; Erik Byléhn; Gustaf Wejnarth; Nils Engdahl	Great Britain; Edward Toms; George Renwick; Richard Ripley; Guy Butler
1928 Amsterdam	United States; George Baird; Emerson Spencer; Fred Alderman; Ray Barbuti	Germany; Otto Neumann; Harry Werner Storz; Richard Krebs; Hermann Engelhard	Canada; Alex Wilson; Phil Edwards; Stanley Glover; James Ball
1932 Los Angeles	United States; Ivan Fuqua; Ed Ablowich; Karl Warner; Bill Carr	Great Britain; Crew Stoneley; Tommy Hampson; David Burghley; Godfrey Rampling	Canada; Ray Lewis; James Ball; Phil Edwards; Alex Wilson
1936 Berlin	Great Britain; Freddie Wolff; Godfrey Rampling; Bill Roberts; Godfrey Brown	United States; Harold Cagle; Robert Young; Edward O’Brien; Al Fitch	Germany; Helmut Hamann; Friedrich von Stülpnagel; Harry Voigt; Rudolf Harbig
1948 London	United States; Arthur Harnden; Cliff Bourland; Roy Cochran; Mal Whitfield	France; Jean Kerebel; Francis Schewetta; Robert Chef d'Hôtel; Jacques Lunis	Sweden; Kurt Lundquist; Lars-Erik Wolfbrandt; Folke Alnevik; Rune Larsson
1952 Helsinki	Jamaica; Arthur Wint; Leslie Laing; Herb McKenley; George Rhoden	United States; Ollie Matson; Gene Cole; Charles Moore; Mal Whitfield	Germany; Hans Geister; Günther Steines; Heinz Ulzheimer; Karl-Friedrich Haas
1956 Melbourne	United States; Lou Jones; Jesse Mashburn; Charles Jenkins; Tom Courtney	Australia; Leon Gregory; David Lean; Kevan Gosper; Graham Gipson	Great Britain; Peter Higgins; Michael Wheeler; John Salisbury; Derek Johnson
1960 Rome	United States; Jack Yerman; Earl Young; Glenn Davis; Otis Davis	United Team of Germany; Hans-Joachim Reske; Manfred Kinder; Johannes Kaiser; Carl Kaufmann	British West Indies; Malcolm Spence; Jim Wedderburn; Keith Gardner; George Kerr
1964 Tokyo	United States; Ollan Cassell; Mike Larrabee; Ulis Williams; Henry Carr	Great Britain; Tim Graham; Adrian Metcalfe; John Cooper; Robbie Brightwell	Trinidad and Tobago; Edwin Skinner; Kent Bernard; Edwin Roberts; Wendell Mottley
1968 Mexico City	United States; Vincent Matthews; Ron Freeman; Larry James; Lee Evans	Kenya; Daniel Rudisha; Munyoro Nyamau; Naftali Bon; Charles Asati	West Germany; Helmar Müller; Manfred Kinder; Gerhard Hennige; Martin Jellinghaus
1972 Munich	Kenya; Charles Asati; Munyoro Nyamau; Robert Ouko; Julius Sang	Great Britain; Martin Reynolds; Alan Pascoe; David Hemery; David Jenkins	France; Gilles Bertould; Daniel Velasques; Francis Kerbiriou; Jacques Carette
1976 Montreal	United States; Herman Frazier; Benny Brown; Fred Newhouse; Maxie Parks	Poland; Ryszard Podlas; Jan Werner; Zbigniew Jaremski; Jerzy Pietrzyk	West Germany; Franz-Peter Hofmeister; Lothar Krieg; Harald Schmid; Bernd Herrmann
1980 Moscow	Soviet Union; Remigijus Valiulis; Mikhail Linge; Nikolay Chernetskiy; Viktor Markin	East Germany; Klaus Thiele; Andreas Knebel; Frank Schaffer; Volker Beck	Italy; Stefano Malinverni; Mauro Zuliani; Roberto Tozzi; Pietro Mennea
1984 Los Angeles	United States; Sunder Nix; Ray Armstead; Alonzo Babers; Antonio McKay	Great Britain; Kriss Akabusi; Garry Cook; Todd Bennett; Phil Brown	Nigeria; Sunday Uti; Moses Ugbisien; Rotimi Peters; Innocent Egbunike
1988 Seoul	United States; Danny Everett; Steve Lewis; Kevin Robinzine; Butch Reynolds	Jamaica; Howard Davis; Devon Morris; Winthrop Graham; Bert Cameron	West Germany; Norbert Dobeleit; Edgar Itt; Jörg Vaihinger; Ralf Lübke
1992 Barcelona	United States; Andrew Valmon; Quincy Watts; Michael Johnson; Steve Lewis; Darnell Hall; Charles Jenkins Jr.	Cuba; Lázaro Martínez; Héctor Herrera; Norberto Téllez; Roberto Hernández	Great Britain; Roger Black; David Grindley; Kriss Akabusi; John Regis; Du'aine Ladejo; Mark Richardson
1996 Atlanta	United States; LaMont Smith; Alvin Harrison; Derek Mills; Anthuan Maybank; Jason Rouser	Great Britain; Iwan Thomas; Jamie Baulch; Mark Richardson; Roger Black; Du'aine Ladejo; Mark Hylton	Jamaica; Michael McDonald; Roxbert Martin; Greg Haughton; Davian Clarke; Dennis Blake; Garth Robinson
2000 Sydney	Nigeria; Clement Chukwu; Jude Monye; Sunday Bada; Enefiok Udo-Obong; Nduka Awazie; Fidelis Gadzama	Jamaica; Michael Blackwood; Greg Haughton; Christopher Williams; Danny McFarlane; Sanjay Ayre; Michael McDonald	Bahamas; Avard Moncur; Troy McIntosh; Carl Oliver; Chris Brown
2004 Athens	United States; Otis Harris; Derrick Brew; Jeremy Wariner; Darold Williamson; Kelly Willie; Andrew Rock	Australia; John Steffensen; Mark Ormrod; Patrick Dwyer; Clinton Hill	Nigeria; James Godday; Musa Audu; Saul Weigopwa; Enefiok Udo-Obong
2008 Beijing	United States; LaShawn Merritt; Angelo Taylor; David Neville; Jeremy Wariner; Kerron Clement; Reggie Witherspoon	Bahamas; Andretti Bain; Michael Mathieu; Andrae Williams; Chris Brown; Avard Moncur; Ramon Miller	Great Britain; Martyn Rooney; Andrew Steele; Robert Tobin; Michael Bingham
2012 London	Bahamas; Chris Brown; Michael Mathieu; Ramon Miller; Demetrius Pinder	United States; Joshua Mance; Manteo Mitchell; Tony McQuay; Bryshon Nellum; Angelo Taylor	Trinidad and Tobago; Ade Alleyne-Forte; Lalonde Gordon; Deon Lendore; Jarrin Solomon
2016 Rio de Janeiro	United States; Arman Hall; Tony McQuay; Gil Roberts; LaShawn Merritt; Kyle Clemons*; David Verburg*	Jamaica; Peter Matthews; Nathon Allen; Fitzroy Dunkley; Javon Francis; Rusheen McDonald*	Bahamas; Alonzo Russell; Michael Mathieu; Steven Gardiner; Chris Brown; Stephen Newbold*
2020 Tokyo	United States; Michael Cherry; Michael Norman; Bryce Deadmon; Rai Benjamin; Trevor Stewart*; Randolph Ross*; Vernon Norwood*	Netherlands; Liemarvin Bonevacia; Terrence Agard; Tony van Diepen; Ramsey Angela; Jochem Dobber*	Botswana; Isaac Makwala; Baboloki Thebe; Zibane Ngozi; Bayapo Ndori
2024 Paris	United States; Christopher Bailey; Vernon Norwood; Bryce Deadmon; Rai Benjamin; Quincy Wilson*	Botswana; Bayapo Ndori; Busang Collen Kebinatshipi; Anthony Pesela; Letsile Tebogo	Great Britain; Alex Haydock-Wilson; Matthew Hudson-Smith; Lewis Davey; Charlie Dobson; Samuel Reardon*; Toby Harries*
2028 Los Angeles			

Note: * Indicates athletes who ran in preliminary rounds and also received medals.

The world record is World Athletics Relays Records 2:57.25 T. Robinson Stadium, Nassau (BAB)

=== High jump ===
Games	Gold	Silver	Bronze
1896 Athens	Ellery Harding Clark; United States	James Brendan Connolly; United States	none awarded
1896 Athens	Ellery Harding Clark; United States	Robert Garrett; United States	none awarded
1900 Paris	Irving Baxter; United States	Patrick Leahy; Great Britain	Lajos Gönczy; Hungary
1904 St. Louis	Samuel Jones; United States	Garrett Serviss; United States	Paul Weinstein; Germany
1908 London	Harry Porter; United States	Géo André; France	none awarded
1908 London	Harry Porter; United States	Con Leahy; Great Britain	none awarded
1908 London	Harry Porter; United States	István Somodi; Hungary	none awarded
1912 Stockholm	Alma Richards; United States	Hans Liesche; Germany	George Horine; United States
1920 Antwerp	Richmond Landon; United States	Harold Muller; United States	Bo Ekelund; Sweden
1924 Paris	Harold Osborn; United States	Leroy Brown; United States	Pierre Lewden; France
1928 Amsterdam	Bob King; United States	Benjamin Hedges; United States	Claude Ménard; France
1932 Los Angeles	Duncan McNaughton; Canada	Bob Van Osdel; United States	Simeon Toribio; Philippines
1936 Berlin	Cornelius Johnson; United States	Dave Albritton; United States	Delos Thurber; United States
1948 London	John Winter; Australia	Bjørn Paulson; Norway	George Stanich; United States
1952 Helsinki	Walt Davis; United States	Ken Wiesner; United States	José da Conceição; Brazil
1956 Melbourne	Charles Dumas; United States	Chilla Porter; Australia	Igor Kashkarov; Soviet Union
1960 Rome	Robert Shavlakadze; Soviet Union	Valeriy Brumel; Soviet Union	John Thomas; United States
1964 Tokyo	Valeriy Brumel; Soviet Union	John Thomas; United States	John Rambo; United States
1968 Mexico City	Dick Fosbury; United States	Ed Caruthers; United States	Valentin Gavrilov; Soviet Union
1972 Munich	Jüri Tarmak; Soviet Union	Stefan Junge; East Germany	Dwight Stones; United States
1976 Montreal	Jacek Wszoła; Poland	Greg Joy; Canada	Dwight Stones; United States
1980 Moscow	Gerd Wessig; East Germany	Jacek Wszoła; Poland	Jörg Freimuth; East Germany
1984 Los Angeles	Dietmar Mögenburg; West Germany	Patrik Sjöberg; Sweden	Zhu Jianhua; China
1988 Seoul	Hennadiy Avdyeyenko; Soviet Union	Hollis Conway; United States	Rudolf Povarnitsyn; Soviet Union
1988 Seoul	Hennadiy Avdyeyenko; Soviet Union	Hollis Conway; United States	Patrik Sjöberg; Sweden
1992 Barcelona	Javier Sotomayor; Cuba	Patrik Sjöberg; Sweden	Hollis Conway; United States
1992 Barcelona	Javier Sotomayor; Cuba	Patrik Sjöberg; Sweden	Tim Forsyth; Australia
1992 Barcelona	Javier Sotomayor; Cuba	Patrik Sjöberg; Sweden	Artur Partyka; Poland
1996 Atlanta	Charles Austin; United States	Artur Partyka; Poland	Steve Smith; Great Britain
2000 Sydney	Sergey Klyugin; Russia	Javier Sotomayor; Cuba	Abderahmane Hammad; Algeria
2004 Athens	Stefan Holm; Sweden	Matt Hemingway; United States	Jaroslav Bába; Czech Republic
2008 Beijing	Andrey Silnov; Russia	Germaine Mason; Great Britain	Yaroslav Rybakov; Russia
2012 London	Erik Kynard; United States	Mutaz Essa Barshim; Qatar	none awarded
2012 London	Erik Kynard; United States	Derek Drouin; Canada	none awarded
2012 London	Erik Kynard; United States	Robbie Grabarz; Great Britain	none awarded
2016 Rio de Janeiro	Derek Drouin; Canada	Mutaz Essa Barshim; Qatar	Bohdan Bondarenko; Ukraine
2020 Tokyo	Gianmarco Tamberi; Italy	none awarded	Maksim Nedasekau; Belarus
2020 Tokyo	Mutaz Essa Barshim; Qatar	none awarded	Maksim Nedasekau; Belarus
2024 Paris	Hamish Kerr; New Zealand	Shelby McEwen; United States	Mutaz Essa Barshim; Qatar
2028 Los Angeles			

=== Pole vault ===
Games	Gold	Silver	Bronze
1896 Athens	William Hoyt; United States	Albert Tyler; United States	Evangelos Damaskos; Greece
1896 Athens	William Hoyt; United States	Albert Tyler; United States	Ioannis Theodoropoulos; Greece
1900 Paris	Irving Baxter; United States	Meredith Colket; United States	Carl Albert Andersen; Norway
1904 St. Louis	Charles Dvorak; United States	LeRoy Samse; United States	Louis Wilkins; United States
1908 London	Edward Cook; United States	none awarded	Edward Archibald; Canada
1908 London	Edward Cook; United States	none awarded	Clare Jacobs; United States
1908 London	Alfred Gilbert; United States	none awarded	Clare Jacobs; United States
1908 London	Alfred Gilbert; United States	none awarded	Bruno Söderström; Sweden
1912 Stockholm	Harry Babcock; United States	Frank Nelson; United States	William Halpenny; Canada
1912 Stockholm	Harry Babcock; United States	Frank Nelson; United States	Frank Murphy; United States
1912 Stockholm	Harry Babcock; United States	Marc Wright; United States	Frank Murphy; United States
1912 Stockholm	Harry Babcock; United States	Marc Wright; United States	Bertil Uggla; Sweden
1920 Antwerp	Frank Foss; United States	Henry Petersen; Denmark	Edwin Myers; United States
1924 Paris	Lee Barnes; United States	Glenn Graham; United States	James Brooker; United States
1928 Amsterdam	Sabin Carr; United States	William Droegemueller; United States	Charles McGinnis; United States
1932 Los Angeles	Bill Miller; United States	Shuhei Nishida; Japan	George Jefferson; United States
1936 Berlin	Earle Meadows; United States	Shuhei Nishida; Japan	Sueo Ōe; Japan
1948 London	Guinn Smith; United States	Erkki Kataja; Finland	Bob Richards; United States
1952 Helsinki	Bob Richards; United States	Don Laz; United States	Ragnar Lundberg; Sweden
1956 Melbourne	Bob Richards; United States	Bob Gutowski; United States	Georgios Roubanis; Greece
1960 Rome	Don Bragg; United States	Ron Morris; United States	Eeles Landström; Finland
1964 Tokyo	Fred Hansen; United States	Wolfgang Reinhardt; United Team of Germany	Klaus Lehnertz; United Team of Germany
1968 Mexico City	Bob Seagren; United States	Claus Schiprowski; West Germany	Wolfgang Nordwig; East Germany
1972 Munich	Wolfgang Nordwig; East Germany	Bob Seagren; United States	Jan Johnson; United States
1976 Montreal	Tadeusz Ślusarski; Poland	Antti Kalliomäki; Finland	David Roberts; United States
1980 Moscow	Władysław Kozakiewicz; Poland	Tadeusz Ślusarski; Poland	none awarded
1980 Moscow	Władysław Kozakiewicz; Poland	Konstantin Volkov; Soviet Union	none awarded
1984 Los Angeles	Pierre Quinon; France	Mike Tully; United States	Earl Bell; United States
1984 Los Angeles	Pierre Quinon; France	Mike Tully; United States	Thierry Vigneron; France
1988 Seoul	Sergey Bubka; Soviet Union	Radion Gataullin; Soviet Union	Grigoriy Yegorov; Soviet Union
1992 Barcelona	Maksim Tarasov; Unified Team	Igor Trandenkov; Unified Team	Javier García; Spain
1996 Atlanta	Jean Galfione; France	Igor Trandenkov; Russia	Andrei Tivontchik; Germany
2000 Sydney	Nick Hysong; United States	Lawrence Johnson; United States	Maksim Tarasov; Russia
2004 Athens	Timothy Mack; United States	Toby Stevenson; United States	Giuseppe Gibilisco; Italy
2008 Beijing	Steve Hooker; Australia	Yevgeny Lukyanenko; Russia	Derek Miles; United States
2012 London	Renaud Lavillenie; France	Björn Otto; Germany	Raphael Holzdeppe; Germany
2016 Rio de Janeiro	Thiago Braz; Brazil	Renaud Lavillenie; France	Sam Kendricks; United States
2020 Tokyo	Armand Duplantis; Sweden	Chris Nilsen; United States	Thiago Braz; Brazil
2024 Paris	Armand Duplantis; Sweden	Sam Kendricks; United States	Emmanouil Karalis; Greece
2028 Los Angeles			

=== Long jump ===
Games	Gold		Silver		Bronze	
1896 Athens	Ellery Clark; United States	6.35 m	Robert Garrett; United States	6.18 m	James Brendan Connolly; United States	6.11 m
1900 Paris	Alvin Kraenzlein; United States	7.185 m	Myer Prinstein; United States	7.175 m	Patrick Leahy; Great Britain	6.95 m
1904 St. Louis	Myer Prinstein; United States	7.34 m	Daniel Frank; United States	6.89 m	Robert Stangland; United States	6.88 m
1908 London	Frank Irons; United States	7.48 m	Daniel Kelly; United States	7.09 m	Calvin Bricker; Canada	7.08 m
1912 Stockholm	Albert Gutterson; United States	7.60 m	Calvin Bricker; Canada	7.21 m	Georg Åberg; Sweden	7.18 m
1920 Antwerp	William Petersson; Sweden	7.15 m	Carl Johnson; United States	7.095 m	Erik Abrahamsson; Sweden	7.08 m
1924 Paris	DeHart Hubbard; United States	7.445 m	Edward Gourdin; United States	7.275 m	Sverre Hansen; Norway	7.26 m
1928 Amsterdam	Ed Hamm; United States	7.73 m	Silvio Cator; Haiti	7.58 m	Al Bates; United States	7.40 m
1932 Los Angeles	Ed Gordon; United States	7.64 m	Lambert Redd; United States	7.60 m	Chūhei Nambu; Japan	7.45 m
1936 Berlin	Jesse Owens; United States	8.06 m	Luz Long; Germany	7.87 m	Naoto Tajima; Japan	7.74 m
1948 London	Willie Steele; United States	7.82 m	Bill Bruce; Australia	7.55 m	Herb Douglas; United States	7.54 m
1952 Helsinki	Jerome Biffle; United States	7.57 m	Meredith Gourdine; United States	7.53 m	Ödön Földessy; Hungary	7.30 m
1956 Melbourne	Gregory Bell; United States	7.83 m	John Bennett; United States	7.68 m	Jorma Valkama; Finland	7.48 m
1960 Rome	Ralph Boston; United States	8.12 m	Bo Roberson; United States	8.11 m	Igor Ter-Ovanesyan; Soviet Union	8.04 m
1964 Tokyo	Lynn Davies; Great Britain	8.07 m	Ralph Boston; United States	8.03 m	Igor Ter-Ovanesyan; Soviet Union	7.99 m
1968 Mexico City	Bob Beamon; United States	8.90 m	Klaus Beer; East Germany	8.19 m	Ralph Boston; United States	8.16 m
1972 Munich	Randy Williams; United States	8.24 m	Hans Baumgartner; West Germany	8.18 m	Arnie Robinson; United States	8.03 m
1976 Montreal	Arnie Robinson; United States	8.35 m	Randy Williams; United States	8.11 m	Frank Wartenberg; East Germany	8.02 m
1980 Moscow	Lutz Dombrowski; East Germany	8.54 m	Frank Paschek; East Germany	8.21 m	Valeriy Pidluzhnyy; Soviet Union	8.18 m
1984 Los Angeles	Carl Lewis; United States	8.54 m	Gary Honey; Australia	8.24 m	Giovanni Evangelisti; Italy	8.24 m
1988 Seoul	Carl Lewis; United States	8.72 m	Mike Powell; United States	8.49 m	Larry Myricks; United States	8.27 m
1992 Barcelona	Carl Lewis; United States	8.67 m	Mike Powell; United States	8.64 m	Joe Greene; United States	8.34 m
1996 Atlanta	Carl Lewis; United States	8.50 m	James Beckford; Jamaica	8.29 m	Joe Greene; United States	8.24 m
2000 Sydney	Iván Pedroso; Cuba	8.55 m	Jai Taurima; Australia	8.49 m	Roman Shchurenko; Ukraine	8.31 m
2004 Athens	Dwight Phillips; United States	8.59 m	John Moffitt; United States	8.47 m	Joan Lino Martínez; Spain	8.32 m
2008 Beijing	Irving Saladino; Panama	8.34 m	Godfrey Khotso Mokoena; South Africa	8.24 m	Ibrahim Camejo; Cuba	8.20 m
2012 London	Greg Rutherford; Great Britain	8.31 m	Mitchell Watt; Australia	8.16 m	Will Claye; United States	8.12 m
2016 Rio de Janeiro	Jeff Henderson; United States	8.38 m	Luvo Manyonga; South Africa	8.37 m	Greg Rutherford; Great Britain	8.29 m
2020 Tokyo	Miltiadis Tentoglou; Greece	8.41 m	Juan Miguel Echevarría; Cuba	8.41 m	Maykel Massó; Cuba	8.21 m
2024 Paris	Miltiadis Tentoglou; Greece	8.48 m	Wayne Pinnock; Jamaica	8.36 m	Mattia Furlani; Italy	8.34 m
2028 Los Angeles						

==== Medal table ====
Rank	Nation	Gold	Silver	Bronze	Total
1	United States (USA)	22	15	10	47
2	Great Britain (GBR)	2	0	2	4
3	Greece (GRE)	2	0	0	2
4	East Germany (GDR)	1	2	1	4
5	Cuba (CUB)	1	1	2	4
6	Sweden (SWE)	1	0	2	3
7	Panama (PAN)	1	0	0	1
8	Australia (AUS)	0	4	0	4
9	Germany (GER)	0	2	0	2
9	Jamaica (JAM)	0	2	0	2
9	South Africa (RSA)	0	2	0	2
12	Canada (CAN)	0	1	1	2
13	Haiti (HAI)	0	1	0	1
14	Soviet Union (URS)	0	0	3	3
15	Italy (ITA)	0	0	2	2
15	Japan (JPN)	0	0	2	2
17	Finland (FIN)	0	0	1	1
17	Hungary (HUN)	0	0	1	1
17	Norway (NOR)	0	0	1	1
17	Spain (ESP)	0	0	1	1
17	Ukraine (UKR)	0	0	1	1
Totals (21 entries)		30	30	30	90

=== Triple jump ===
Games	Gold	Silver	Bronze
1896 Athens	James Brendan Connolly; United States	Alexandre Tuffère; France	Ioannis Persakis; Greece
1900 Paris	Myer Prinstein; United States	James Brendan Connolly; United States	Lewis Sheldon; United States
1904 St. Louis	Myer Prinstein; United States	Fred Englehardt; United States	Robert Stangland; United States
1908 London	Tim Ahearne; Great Britain	Garfield MacDonald; Canada	Edvard Larsen; Norway
1912 Stockholm	Gustaf Lindblom; Sweden	Georg Åberg; Sweden	Erik Almlöf; Sweden
1920 Antwerp	Vilho Tuulos; Finland	Folke Jansson; Sweden	Erik Almlöf; Sweden
1924 Paris	Nick Winter; Australia	Luis Brunetto; Argentina	Vilho Tuulos; Finland
1928 Amsterdam	Mikio Oda; Japan	Levi Casey; United States	Vilho Tuulos; Finland
1932 Los Angeles	Chūhei Nambu; Japan	Erik Svensson; Sweden	Kenkichi Oshima; Japan
1936 Berlin	Naoto Tajima; Japan	Masao Harada; Japan	Jack Metcalfe; Australia
1948 London	Arne Åhman; Sweden	George Avery; Australia	Ruhi Sarıalp; Turkey
1952 Helsinki	Adhemar da Silva; Brazil	Leonid Shcherbakov; Soviet Union	Asnoldo Devonish; Venezuela
1956 Melbourne	Adhemar da Silva; Brazil	Vilhjálmur Einarsson; Iceland	Vitold Kreyer; Soviet Union
1960 Rome	Józef Szmidt; Poland	Vladimir Goryaev; Soviet Union	Vitold Kreyer; Soviet Union
1964 Tokyo	Józef Szmidt; Poland	Oleg Fedoseyev; Soviet Union	Viktor Kravchenko; Soviet Union
1968 Mexico City	Viktor Saneyev; Soviet Union	Nelson Prudêncio; Brazil	Giuseppe Gentile; Italy
1972 Munich	Viktor Saneyev; Soviet Union	Jörg Drehmel; East Germany	Nelson Prudêncio; Brazil
1976 Montreal	Viktor Saneyev; Soviet Union	James Butts; United States	João Carlos de Oliveira; Brazil
1980 Moscow	Jaak Uudmäe; Soviet Union	Viktor Saneyev; Soviet Union	João Carlos de Oliveira; Brazil
1984 Los Angeles	Al Joyner; United States	Mike Conley; United States	Keith Connor; Great Britain
1988 Seoul	Khristo Markov; Bulgaria	Igor Lapshin; Soviet Union	Aleksandr Kovalenko; Soviet Union
1992 Barcelona	Mike Conley; United States	Charles Simpkins; United States	Frank Rutherford; Bahamas
1996 Atlanta	Kenny Harrison; United States	Jonathan Edwards; Great Britain	Yoelbi Quesada; Cuba
2000 Sydney	Jonathan Edwards; Great Britain	Yoel García; Cuba	Denis Kapustin; Russia
2004 Athens	Christian Olsson; Sweden	Marian Oprea; Romania	Danil Burkenya; Russia
2008 Beijing	Nelson Évora; Portugal	Phillips Idowu; Great Britain	Leevan Sands; Bahamas
2012 London	Christian Taylor; United States	Will Claye; United States	Fabrizio Donato; Italy
2016 Rio de Janeiro	Christian Taylor; United States	Will Claye; United States	Dong Bin; China
2020 Tokyo	Pedro Pichardo; Portugal	Zhu Yaming; China	Hugues Fabrice Zango; Burkina Faso
2024 Paris	Jordan Díaz; Spain	Pedro Pichardo; Portugal	Andy Díaz; Italy
2028 Los Angeles			

=== Shot put ===
Games	Gold	Silver	Bronze
1896 Athens	Robert Garrett; United States	Miltiadis Gouskos; Greece	Georgios Papasideris; Greece
1900 Paris	Richard Sheldon; United States	Josiah McCracken; United States	Robert Garrett; United States
1904 St. Louis	Ralph Rose; United States	Wesley Coe; United States	Lawrence Feuerbach; United States
1908 London	Ralph Rose; United States	Denis Horgan; Great Britain	John Garrels; United States
1912 Stockholm	Pat McDonald; United States	Ralph Rose; United States	Lawrence Whitney; United States
1920 Antwerp	Ville Pörhölä; Finland	Elmer Niklander; Finland	Harry Liversedge; United States
1924 Paris	Bud Houser; United States	Glenn Hartranft; United States	Ralph Hills; United States
1928 Amsterdam	John Kuck; United States	Herman Brix; United States	Emil Hirschfeld; Germany
1932 Los Angeles	Leo Sexton; United States	Harlow Rothert; United States	František Douda; Czechoslovakia
1936 Berlin	Hans Woellke; Germany	Sulo Bärlund; Finland	Gerhard Stöck; Germany
1948 London	Wilbur Thompson; United States	Jim Delaney; United States	Jim Fuchs; United States
1952 Helsinki	Parry O'Brien; United States	Darrow Hooper; United States	Jim Fuchs; United States
1956 Melbourne	Parry O'Brien; United States	Bill Nieder; United States	Jiří Skobla; Czechoslovakia
1960 Rome	Bill Nieder; United States	Parry O'Brien; United States	Dallas Long; United States
1964 Tokyo	Dallas Long; United States	Randy Matson; United States	Vilmos Varjú; Hungary
1968 Mexico City	Randy Matson; United States	George Woods; United States	Eduard Gushchin; Soviet Union
1972 Munich	Władysław Komar; Poland	George Woods; United States	Hartmut Briesenick; East Germany
1976 Montreal	Udo Beyer; East Germany	Yevgeniy Mironov; Soviet Union	Aleksandr Baryshnikov; Soviet Union
1980 Moscow	Vladimir Kiselyov; Soviet Union	Aleksandr Baryshnikov; Soviet Union	Udo Beyer; East Germany
1984 Los Angeles	Alessandro Andrei; Italy	Mike Carter; United States	Dave Laut; United States
1988 Seoul	Ulf Timmermann; East Germany	Randy Barnes; United States	Werner Günthör; Switzerland
1992 Barcelona	Mike Stulce; United States	Jim Doehring; United States	Vyacheslav Lykho; Unified Team
1996 Atlanta	Randy Barnes; United States	John Godina; United States	Oleksandr Bagach; Ukraine
2000 Sydney	Arsi Harju; Finland	Adam Nelson; United States	John Godina; United States
2004 Athens	Adam Nelson; United States	Joachim Olsen; Denmark	Manuel Martínez; Spain
2008 Beijing	Tomasz Majewski; Poland	Christian Cantwell; United States	Dylan Armstrong; Canada
2012 London	Tomasz Majewski; Poland	David Storl; Germany	Reese Hoffa; United States
2016 Rio de Janeiro	Ryan Crouser; United States	Joe Kovacs; United States	Tom Walsh; New Zealand
2020 Tokyo	Ryan Crouser; United States	Joe Kovacs; United States	Tom Walsh; New Zealand
2024 Paris	Ryan Crouser; United States	Joe Kovacs; United States	Rajindra Campbell; Jamaica
2028 Los Angeles			

=== Discus throw ===
Games	Gold	Silver	Bronze
1896 Athens	Robert Garrett; United States	Panagiotis Paraskevopoulos; Greece	Sotirios Versis; Greece
1900 Paris	Rudolf Bauer; Hungary	František Janda-Suk; Bohemia	Richard Sheldon; United States
1904 St. Louis	Martin Sheridan; United States	Ralph Rose; United States	Nikolaos Georgantas; Greece
1908 London	Martin Sheridan; United States	Merritt Giffin; United States	Bill Horr; United States
1912 Stockholm	Armas Taipale; Finland	Richard Byrd; United States	James Duncan; United States
1920 Antwerp	Elmer Niklander; Finland	Armas Taipale; Finland	Gus Pope; United States
1924 Paris	Bud Houser; United States	Vilho Niittymaa; Finland	Thomas Lieb; United States
1928 Amsterdam	Bud Houser; United States	Antero Kivi; Finland	James Corson; United States
1932 Los Angeles	John Anderson; United States	Henri LaBorde; United States	Paul Winter; France
1936 Berlin	Ken Carpenter; United States	Gordon Dunn; United States	Giorgio Oberweger; Italy
1948 London	Adolfo Consolini; Italy	Giuseppe Tosi; Italy	Fortune Gordien; United States
1952 Helsinki	Sim Iness; United States	Adolfo Consolini; Italy	James Dillion; United States
1956 Melbourne	Al Oerter; United States	Fortune Gordien; United States	Des Koch; United States
1960 Rome	Al Oerter; United States	Rink Babka; United States	Dick Cochran; United States
1964 Tokyo	Al Oerter; United States	Ludvík Daněk; Czechoslovakia	Dave Weill; United States
1968 Mexico City	Al Oerter; United States	Lothar Milde; East Germany	Ludvík Daněk; Czechoslovakia
1972 Munich	Ludvík Daněk; Czechoslovakia	Jay Silvester; United States	Ricky Bruch; Sweden
1976 Montreal	Mac Wilkins; United States	Wolfgang Schmidt; East Germany	John Powell; United States
1980 Moscow	Viktor Rashchupkin; Soviet Union	Imrich Bugár; Czechoslovakia	Luis Delís; Cuba
1984 Los Angeles	Rolf Danneberg; West Germany	Mac Wilkins; United States	John Powell; United States
1988 Seoul	Jürgen Schult; East Germany	Romas Ubartas; Soviet Union	Rolf Danneberg; West Germany
1992 Barcelona	Romas Ubartas; Lithuania	Jürgen Schult; Germany	Roberto Moya; Cuba
1996 Atlanta	Lars Riedel; Germany	Vladimir Dubrovshchik; Belarus	Vasiliy Kaptyukh; Belarus
2000 Sydney	Virgilijus Alekna; Lithuania	Lars Riedel; Germany	Frantz Kruger; South Africa
2004 Athens	Virgilijus Alekna; Lithuania	Zoltán Kővágó; Hungary	Aleksander Tammert; Estonia
2008 Beijing	Gerd Kanter; Estonia	Piotr Małachowski; Poland	Virgilijus Alekna; Lithuania
2012 London	Robert Harting; Germany	Ehsan Haddadi; Iran	Gerd Kanter; Estonia
2016 Rio de Janeiro	Christoph Harting; Germany	Piotr Małachowski; Poland	Daniel Jasinski; Germany
2020 Tokyo	Daniel Ståhl; Sweden	Simon Pettersson; Sweden	Lukas Weißhaidinger; Austria
2024 Paris	Roje Stona; Jamaica	Mykolas Alekna; Lithuania	Matthew Denny; Australia
2028 Los Angeles			

=== Hammer throw ===
Games	Gold	Silver	Bronze
1900 Paris	John Flanagan; United States	Truxtun Hare; United States	Josiah McCracken; United States
1904 St. Louis	John Flanagan; United States	John DeWitt; United States	Ralph Rose; United States
1908 London	John Flanagan; United States	Matt McGrath; United States	Con Walsh; Canada
1912 Stockholm	Matt McGrath; United States	Duncan Gillis; Canada	Clarence Childs; United States
1920 Antwerp	Patrick Ryan; United States	Carl Johan Lind; Sweden	Basil Bennett; United States
1924 Paris	Fred Tootell; United States	Matt McGrath; United States	Malcolm Nokes; Great Britain
1928 Amsterdam	Pat O'Callaghan; Ireland	Ossian Skiöld; Sweden	Edmund Black; United States
1932 Los Angeles	Pat O'Callaghan; Ireland	Ville Pörhölä; Finland	Peter Zaremba; United States
1936 Berlin	Karl Hein; Germany	Erwin Blask; Germany	Fred Warngård; Sweden
1948 London	Imre Németh; Hungary	Ivan Gubijan; Yugoslavia	Robert Bennett; United States
1952 Helsinki	József Csermák; Hungary	Karl Storch; Germany	Imre Németh; Hungary
1956 Melbourne	Hal Connolly; United States	Mikhail Krivonosov; Soviet Union	Anatoliy Samotsvetov; Soviet Union
1960 Rome	Vasily Rudenkov; Soviet Union	Gyula Zsivótzky; Hungary	Tadeusz Rut; Poland
1964 Tokyo	Romuald Klim; Soviet Union	Gyula Zsivótzky; Hungary	Uwe Beyer; United Team of Germany
1968 Mexico City	Gyula Zsivótzky; Hungary	Romuald Klim; Soviet Union	Lázár Lovász; Hungary
1972 Munich	Anatoliy Bondarchuk; Soviet Union	Jochen Sachse; East Germany	Vasiliy Khmelevskiy; Soviet Union
1976 Montreal	Yuriy Sedykh; Soviet Union	Aleksey Spiridonov; Soviet Union	Anatoliy Bondarchuk; Soviet Union
1980 Moscow	Yuriy Sedykh; Soviet Union	Sergey Litvinov; Soviet Union	Jüri Tamm; Soviet Union
1984 Los Angeles	Juha Tiainen; Finland	Karl-Hans Riehm; West Germany	Klaus Ploghaus; West Germany
1988 Seoul	Sergey Litvinov; Soviet Union	Yuriy Sedykh; Soviet Union	Jüri Tamm; Soviet Union
1992 Barcelona	Andrey Abduvaliyev; Unified Team	Igor Astapkovich; Unified Team	Igor Nikulin; Unified Team
1996 Atlanta	Balázs Kiss; Hungary	Lance Deal; United States	Oleksandr Krykun; Ukraine
2000 Sydney	Szymon Ziółkowski; Poland	Nicola Vizzoni; Italy	Igor Astapkovich; Belarus
2004 Athens	Koji Murofushi; Japan	Not awarded	Not awarded
2008 Beijing	Primož Kozmus; Slovenia	Vadim Devyatovskiy; Belarus	Ivan Tsikhan; Belarus
2012 London	Krisztián Pars; Hungary	Primož Kozmus; Slovenia	Koji Murofushi; Japan
2016 Rio de Janeiro	Dilshod Nazarov; Tajikistan	Ivan Tsikhan; Belarus	Wojciech Nowicki; Poland
2020 Tokyo	Wojciech Nowicki; Poland	Eivind Henriksen; Norway	Paweł Fajdek; Poland
2024 Paris	Ethan Katzberg; Canada	Bence Halász; Hungary	Mykhaylo Kokhan; Ukraine
2028 Los Angeles			

=== Javelin throw ===
Games	Gold	Silver	Bronze
1908 London	Eric Lemming; Sweden	Arne Halse; Norway	Otto Nilsson; Sweden
1912 Stockholm	Eric Lemming; Sweden	Julius Saaristo; Finland	Mór Kóczán; Hungary
1920 Antwerp	Jonni Myyrä; Finland	Urho Peltonen; Finland	Pekka Johansson; Finland
1924 Paris	Jonni Myyrä; Finland	Gunnar Lindström; Sweden	Eugene Oberst; United States
1928 Amsterdam	Erik Lundqvist; Sweden	Béla Szepes; Hungary	Olav Sunde; Norway
1932 Los Angeles	Matti Järvinen; Finland	Matti Sippala; Finland	Eino Penttilä; Finland
1936 Berlin	Gerhard Stöck; Germany	Yrjö Nikkanen; Finland	Kalervo Toivonen; Finland
1948 London	Tapio Rautavaara; Finland	Steve Seymour; United States	József Várszegi; Hungary
1952 Helsinki	Cy Young; United States	Bill Miller; United States	Toivo Hyytiäinen; Finland
1956 Melbourne	Egil Danielsen; Norway	Janusz Sidło; Poland	Viktor Tsybulenko; Soviet Union
1960 Rome	Viktor Tsybulenko; Soviet Union	Walter Krüger; United Team of Germany	Gergely Kulcsár; Hungary
1964 Tokyo	Pauli Nevala; Finland	Gergely Kulcsár; Hungary	Jānis Lūsis; Soviet Union
1968 Mexico City	Jānis Lūsis; Soviet Union	Jorma Kinnunen; Finland	Gergely Kulcsár; Hungary
1972 Munich	Klaus Wolfermann; West Germany	Jānis Lūsis; Soviet Union	Bill Schmidt; United States
1976 Montreal	Miklós Németh; Hungary	Hannu Siitonen; Finland	Gheorghe Megelea; Romania
1980 Moscow	Dainis Kūla; Soviet Union	Aleksandr Makarov; Soviet Union	Wolfgang Hanisch; East Germany
1984 Los Angeles	Arto Härkönen; Finland	David Ottley; Great Britain	Kenth Eldebrink; Sweden
1988 Seoul	Tapio Korjus; Finland	Jan Železný; Czechoslovakia	Seppo Räty; Finland
1992 Barcelona	Jan Železný; Czechoslovakia	Seppo Räty; Finland	Steve Backley; Great Britain
1996 Atlanta	Jan Železný; Czech Republic	Steve Backley; Great Britain	Seppo Räty; Finland
2000 Sydney	Jan Železný; Czech Republic	Steve Backley; Great Britain	Sergey Makarov; Russia
2004 Athens	Andreas Thorkildsen; Norway	Vadims Vasiļevskis; Latvia	Sergey Makarov; Russia
2008 Beijing	Andreas Thorkildsen; Norway	Ainārs Kovals; Latvia	Tero Pitkämäki; Finland
2012 London	Keshorn Walcott; Trinidad and Tobago	Antti Ruuskanen; Finland	Vítězslav Veselý; Czech Republic
2016 Rio de Janeiro	Thomas Röhler; Germany	Julius Yego; Kenya	Keshorn Walcott; Trinidad and Tobago
2020 Tokyo	Neeraj Chopra; India	Jakub Vadlejch; Czech Republic	Vítězslav Veselý; Czech Republic
2024 Paris	Arshad Nadeem; Pakistan	Neeraj Chopra; India	Anderson Peters; Grenada
2028 Los Angeles			

=== Decathlon ===
At the St. Louis Games in 1904, the decathlon contest was entitled the All-Around competition, and consisted of: 100 yards dash, shot put, high jump, 800 yard walk, hammer throw, pole vault, 120 yards hurdles, 56 pounds weight throw, long jump, and a mile run.

Games	Gold	Silver	Bronze
1912 Stockholm	Jim Thorpe; United States	Hugo Wieslander; Sweden; Charles Lomberg; Sweden	Gösta Holmér; Sweden
1920 Antwerp	Helge Løvland; Norway	Brutus Hamilton; United States	Bertil Ohlson; Sweden
1924 Paris	Harold Osborn; United States	Emerson Norton; United States	Aleksander Klumberg; Estonia
1928 Amsterdam	Paavo Yrjölä; Finland	Akilles Järvinen; Finland	Ken Doherty; United States
1932 Los Angeles	Jim Bausch; United States	Akilles Järvinen; Finland	Wolrad Eberle; Germany
1936 Berlin	Glenn Morris; United States	Bob Clark; United States	Jack Parker; United States
1948 London	Bob Mathias; United States	Ignace Heinrich; France	Floyd Simmons; United States
1952 Helsinki	Bob Mathias; United States	Milt Campbell; United States	Floyd Simmons; United States
1956 Melbourne	Milt Campbell; United States	Rafer Johnson; United States	Vasili Kuznetsov; Soviet Union
1960 Rome	Rafer Johnson; United States	Yang Chuan-kwang; Formosa	Vasili Kuznetsov; Soviet Union
1964 Tokyo	Willi Holdorf; United Team of Germany	Rein Aun; Soviet Union	Hans-Joachim Walde; United Team of Germany
1968 Mexico City	Bill Toomey; United States	Hans-Joachim Walde; West Germany	Kurt Bendlin; West Germany
1972 Munich	Mykola Avilov; Soviet Union	Leonid Lytvynenko; Soviet Union	Ryszard Katus; Poland
1976 Montreal	Bruce Jenner (Note: Jenner is now known as Caitlyn due to gender transition in 2015.); United States	Guido Kratschmer; West Germany	Mykola Avilov; Soviet Union
1980 Moscow	Daley Thompson; Great Britain	Yuriy Kutsenko; Soviet Union	Sergei Zhelanov; Soviet Union
1984 Los Angeles	Daley Thompson; Great Britain	Jürgen Hingsen; West Germany	Siegfried Wentz; West Germany
1988 Seoul	Christian Schenk; East Germany	Torsten Voss; East Germany	Dave Steen; Canada
1992 Barcelona	Robert Změlík; Czechoslovakia	Antonio Peñalver; Spain	Dave Johnson; United States
1996 Atlanta	Dan O'Brien; United States	Frank Busemann; Germany	Tomáš Dvořák; Czech Republic
2000 Sydney	Erki Nool; Estonia	Roman Šebrle; Czech Republic	Chris Huffins; United States
2004 Athens	Roman Šebrle; Czech Republic	Bryan Clay; United States	Dmitriy Karpov; Kazakhstan
2008 Beijing	Bryan Clay; United States	Andrei Krauchanka; Belarus	Leonel Suárez; Cuba
2012 London	Ashton Eaton; United States	Trey Hardee; United States	Leonel Suárez; Cuba
2016 Rio De Janeiro	Ashton Eaton; United States	Kevin Mayer; France	Damian Warner; Canada
2020 Tokyo	Damian Warner; Canada	Kevin Mayer; France	Ashley Moloney; Australia
2024 Paris	Markus Rooth; Norway	Leo Neugebauer; Germany	Lindon Victor; Grenada
2028 Los Angeles			

== Mixed Events ==
=== 4 × 100 metres relay ===
Games	Gold	Silver	Bronze
2028 Los Angeles			

=== 4 × 400 metres relay ===
Games	Gold	Silver	Bronze
2020 Tokyo	Poland; Kajetan Duszyński; Natalia Kaczmarek; Justyna Święty-Ersetic; Karol Zalewski; Dariusz Kowaluk*; Iga Baumgart*; Małgorzata Hołub-Kowalik*	Dominican Republic; Lidio Andrés Feliz; Marileidy Paulino; Anabel Medina; Alexander Ogando; Luguelín Santos*	United States; Kendall Ellis; Vernon Norwood; Trevor Stewart; Kaylin Whitney; Elija Godwin*; Lynna Irby*; Taylor Manson*; Bryce Deadmon*
2024 Paris	Netherlands; Eugene Omalla; Lieke Klaver; Isaya Klein Ikkink; Femke Bol; Cathelijn Peeters	United States; Vernon Norwood; Shamier Little; Bryce Deadmon; Kaylyn Brown	Great Britain; Samuel Reardon; Laviai Nielsen; Alex Haydock-Wilson; Amber Anning; Nicole Yeargin
2028 Los Angeles			

== Discontinued events ==
=== 60 metres ===
Games	Gold	Silver	Bronze
1900 Paris	Alvin Kraenzlein; United States	Walter Tewksbury; United States	Stan Rowley; Australia
1904 St. Louis	Archie Hahn; United States	William Hogenson; United States	Fay Moulton; United States

=== 5 miles ===
Games	Gold	Silver	Bronze
1908 London	Emil Voigt; Great Britain	Edward Owen; Great Britain	John Svanberg; Sweden

=== 200 metres hurdles ===
Games	Gold	Silver	Bronze
1900 Paris	Alvin Kraenzlein; United States	Norman Pritchard; India	Walter Tewksbury; United States
1904 St. Louis	Harry Hillman; United States	Frank Castleman; United States	George Poage; United States

=== 2500 metres steeplechase ===
Games	Gold	Silver	Bronze
1900 Paris	George Orton; United States	Sidney Robinson; Great Britain	Jacques Chastanié; France

=== 2590 metres steeplechase ===
Games	Gold	Silver	Bronze
1904 St. Louis	James Lightbody; United States	John Daly; Great Britain	Arthur Newton; United States

=== 3200 metres steeplechase ===
Games	Gold	Silver	Bronze
1908 London	Arthur Russell; Great Britain	Archie Robertson; Great Britain	John Eisele; United States

=== 4000 metres steeplechase ===
Games	Gold	Silver	Bronze
1900 Paris	John Rimmer; Great Britain	Charles Bennett; Great Britain	Sidney Robinson; Great Britain

=== 1600 metres relay ===
The first relay event to be held at the Olympics, the 1600 m relay consisted of two legs over 200 m, one over 400 m, and one over 800 m. This "medley" relay was replaced by the 4 × 400 m relay at subsequent Olympics.

Games	Gold	Silver	Bronze
1908 London	United States; William Hamilton; Nate Cartmell; John Taylor; Mel Sheppard	Germany; Arthur Hoffmann; Hans Eicke; Otto Trieloff; Hanns Braun	Hungary; Pál Simon; Frigyes Wiesner; József Nagy; Ödön Bodor

=== 3000 metres team race ===
Games	Gold	Silver	Bronze
1912 Stockholm	United States; Tell Berna; George Bonhag; Abel Kiviat; Louis Scott; Norman Taber	Sweden; Bror Fock; Nils Frykberg; Thorild Olsson; Ernst Wide; John Zander	Great Britain; Joe Cottrill; George Hutson; William Moore; Edward Owen; Cyril Porter
1920 Antwerp	United States; Horace Brown; Ivan Dresser; Arlie Schardt	Great Britain; Joe Blewitt; Albert Hill; William Seagrove	Sweden; Eric Backman; Sven Lundgren; Edvin Wide
1924 Paris	Finland; Elias Katz; Paavo Nurmi; Ville Ritola	Great Britain; Herbert Johnston; Bertram Macdonald; George Webber	United States; William Cox; Edward Kirby; Willard Tibbetts

=== 5000 metres team race ===
Games	Gold	Silver	Bronze
1900 Paris	Great Britain; Charles Bennett; Great Britain; John Rimmer; Great Britain; Sidney Robinson; Great Britain; Alfred Tysoe; Great Britain; Stan Rowley; Australia	France; Henri Deloge; Gaston Ragueneau; Jacques Chastanié; André Castanet; Michel Champoudry	none awarded

=== 3-mile team race ===
Games	Gold	Silver	Bronze
1908 London	Great Britain; Joe Deakin; Archie Robertson; William Coales	United States; John Eisele; George Bonhag; Herbert Trube	France; Louis de Fleurac; Joseph Dreher; Paul Lizandier

=== 4-mile team race ===
Games	Gold	Silver	Bronze
1904 St. Louis	United States; Arthur Newton; George Underwood; Paul Pilgrim; Howard Valentine; David Munson	United States; James Lightbody; United States; Frank Verner; United States; Lacey Hearn; United States; Albert Corey; France; Sidney Hatch; United States	none awarded

=== Cross country (individual) ===
Games	Gold	Silver	Bronze
1912 Stockholm	Hannes Kolehmainen; Finland	Hjalmar Andersson; Sweden	John Eke; Sweden
1920 Antwerp	Paavo Nurmi; Finland	Eric Backman; Sweden	Heikki Liimatainen; Finland
1924 Paris	Paavo Nurmi; Finland	Ville Ritola; Finland	Earl Johnson; United States

=== Cross country (team) ===
Games	Gold	Silver	Bronze
1912 Stockholm	Sweden; Hjalmar Andersson; John Eke; Josef Ternström	Finland; Hannes Kolehmainen; Jalmari Eskola; Albin Stenroos	Great Britain; Frederick Hibbins; Ernest Glover; Thomas Humphreys
1920 Antwerp	Finland; Paavo Nurmi; Heikki Liimatainen; Teodor Koskenniemi	Great Britain; James Wilson; Anton Hegarty; Alfred Nichols	Sweden; Eric Backman; Gustaf Mattsson; Hilding Ekman
1924 Paris	Finland; Paavo Nurmi; Ville Ritola; Heikki Liimatainen	United States; Earl Johnson; Arthur Studenroth; August Fager	France; Henri Lauvaux; Gaston Heuet; Maurice Norland

=== 3000 metres race walk ===
Games	Gold	Silver	Bronze
1920 Antwerp	Ugo Frigerio; Italy	George Parker; Australia	Richard Remer; United States

=== 3500 metres race walk ===
Games	Gold	Silver	Bronze
1908 London	George Larner; Great Britain	Ernest Webb; Great Britain	Harry Kerr; Australasia

=== 10 kilometres race walk ===
Games	Gold	Silver	Bronze
1912 Stockholm	George Goulding; Canada	Ernest Webb; Great Britain	Fernando Altimani; Italy
1920 Antwerp	Ugo Frigerio; Italy	Joseph Pearman; United States	Charles Gunn; Great Britain
1924 Paris	Ugo Frigerio; Italy	Gordon Goodwin; Great Britain	Cecil McMaster; South Africa
1928–1936	not included in the Olympic program		
1948 London	John Mikaelsson; Sweden	Ingemar Johansson; Sweden	Fritz Schwab; Switzerland
1952 Helsinki	John Mikaelsson; Sweden	Fritz Schwab; Switzerland	Bruno Junk; Soviet Union

=== 10 miles race walk ===
Games	Gold	Silver	Bronze
1908 London	George Larner; Great Britain	Ernest Webb; Great Britain	Edward Spencer; Great Britain

=== 20 kilometres race walk ===
Games	Gold	Silver	Bronze
1956 Melbourne	Leonid Spirin; Soviet Union	Antanas Mikėnas; Soviet Union	Bruno Junk; Soviet Union
1960 Rome	Volodymyr Holubnychy; Soviet Union	Noel Freeman; Australia	Stan Vickers; Great Britain
1964 Tokyo	Ken Matthews; Great Britain	Dieter Lindner; United Team of Germany	Volodymyr Holubnychy; Soviet Union
1968 Mexico City	Volodymyr Holubnychy; Soviet Union	José Pedraza; Mexico	Nikolay Smaga; Soviet Union
1972 Munich	Peter Frenkel; East Germany	Volodymyr Holubnychy; Soviet Union	Hans-Georg Reimann; East Germany
1976 Montreal	Daniel Bautista; Mexico	Hans-Georg Reimann; East Germany	Peter Frenkel; East Germany
1980 Moscow	Maurizio Damilano; Italy	Pyotr Pochynchuk; Soviet Union	Roland Wieser; East Germany
1984 Los Angeles	Ernesto Canto; Mexico	Raúl González; Mexico	Maurizio Damilano; Italy
1988 Seoul	Jozef Pribilinec; Czechoslovakia	Ronald Weigel; East Germany	Maurizio Damilano; Italy
1992 Barcelona	Daniel Plaza; Spain	Guillaume LeBlanc; Canada	Giovanni De Benedictis; Italy
1996 Atlanta	Jefferson Pérez; Ecuador	Ilya Markov; Russia	Bernardo Segura; Mexico
2000 Sydney	Robert Korzeniowski; Poland	Noé Hernández; Mexico	Vladimir Andreyev; Russia
2004 Athens	Ivano Brugnetti; Italy	Paquillo Fernández; Spain	Nathan Deakes; Australia
2008 Beijing	Valeriy Borchin; Russia	Jefferson Pérez; Ecuador	Jared Tallent; Australia
2012 London	Chen Ding; China	Érick Barrondo; Guatemala	Wang Zhen; China
2016 Rio de Janeiro	Wang Zhen; China	Cai Zelin; China	Dane Bird-Smith; Australia
2020 Tokyo	Massimo Stano; Italy	Koki Ikeda; Japan	Toshikazu Yamanishi; Japan
2024 Paris	Brian Pintado; Ecuador	Caio Bonfim; Brazil	Álvaro Martín; Spain

=== 50 kilometres race walk ===
Games	Gold	Silver	Bronze
1932 Los Angeles	Tommy Green; Great Britain	Jānis Daliņš; Latvia	Ugo Frigerio; Italy
1936 Berlin	Harold Whitlock; Great Britain	Arthur Tell Schwab; Switzerland	Adalberts Bubenko; Latvia
1948 London	John Ljunggren; Sweden	Gaston Godel; Switzerland	Tebbs Lloyd Johnson; Great Britain
1952 Helsinki	Pino Dordoni; Italy	Josef Doležal; Czechoslovakia	Antal Róka; Hungary
1956 Melbourne	Norman Read; New Zealand	Yevgeny Maskinskov; Soviet Union	John Ljunggren; Sweden
1960 Rome	Don Thompson; Great Britain	John Ljunggren; Sweden	Abdon Pamich; Italy
1964 Tokyo	Abdon Pamich; Italy	Paul Nihill; Great Britain	Ingvar Pettersson; Sweden
1968 Mexico City	Christoph Höhne; East Germany	Antal Kiss; Hungary	Larry Young; United States
1972 Munich	Bernd Kannenberg; West Germany	Veniamin Soldatenko; Soviet Union	Larry Young; United States
1976 Montreal	not included in the Olympic program		
1980 Moscow	Hartwig Gauder; East Germany	Jordi Llopart; Spain	Yevgeniy Ivchenko; Soviet Union
1984 Los Angeles	Raúl González; Mexico	Bo Gustafsson; Sweden	Sandro Bellucci; Italy
1988 Seoul	Vyacheslav Ivanenko; Soviet Union	Ronald Weigel; East Germany	Hartwig Gauder; East Germany
1992 Barcelona	Andrey Perlov; Unified Team	Carlos Mercenario; Mexico	Ronald Weigel; Germany
1996 Atlanta	Robert Korzeniowski; Poland	Mikhail Shchennikov; Russia	Valentí Massana; Spain
2000 Sydney	Robert Korzeniowski; Poland	Aigars Fadejevs; Latvia	Joel Sánchez; Mexico
2004 Athens	Robert Korzeniowski; Poland	Denis Nizhegorodov; Russia	Aleksey Voyevodin; Russia
2008 Beijing	Alex Schwazer; Italy	Jared Tallent; Australia	Denis Nizhegorodov; Russia
2012 London	Jared Tallent; Australia	Si Tianfeng; China	Robert Heffernan; Ireland
2016 Rio de Janeiro	Matej Tóth; Slovakia	Jared Tallent; Australia	Hirooki Arai; Japan
2020 Tokyo	Dawid Tomala; Poland	Jonathan Hilbert; Germany	Evan Dunfee; Canada

=== Marathon walk relay ===
Games	Gold	Silver	Bronze
2024 Paris	Spain; Álvaro Martín; María Pérez	Ecuador; Brian Pintado; Glenda Morejón	Australia; Rhydian Cowley; Jemima Montag

=== Standing high jump ===
Games	Gold	Silver	Bronze
1900 Paris	Ray Ewry; United States	Irving Baxter; United States	Lewis Sheldon; United States
1904 St. Louis	Ray Ewry; United States	Joseph Stadler; United States	Lawson Robertson; United States
1908 London	Ray Ewry; United States	John Biller; United States Konstantinos Tsiklitiras; Greece	None awarded
1912 Stockholm	Platt Adams; United States	Benjamin Adams; United States	Konstantinos Tsiklitiras; Greece

=== Standing long jump ===
Games	Gold	Silver	Bronze
1900 Paris	Ray Ewry; United States	Irving Baxter; United States	Emile Torcheboeuf; France
1904 St. Louis	Ray Ewry; United States	Charles King; United States	John Biller; United States
1908 London	Ray Ewry; United States	Konstantinos Tsiklitiras; Greece	Martin Sheridan; United States
1912 Stockholm	Konstantinos Tsiklitiras; Greece	Platt Adams; United States	Benjamin Adams; United States

=== Standing triple jump ===
Games	Gold	Silver	Bronze
1900 Paris	Ray Ewry (USA)	Irving Baxter (USA)	Robert Garrett (USA)
1904 St. Louis	Ray Ewry (USA)	Charles King (USA)	Joseph Stadler (USA)

=== Shot put (two-handed) ===
Games	Gold	Silver	Bronze
1912 Stockholm	Ralph Rose; United States	Pat McDonald; United States	Elmer Niklander; Finland

=== Discus throw (Greek style) ===
Games	Gold	Silver	Bronze
1908 London	Martin Sheridan; United States	Bill Horr; United States	Verner Järvinen; Finland

=== Discus throw (two-handed) ===
Games	Gold	Silver	Bronze
1912 Stockholm	Armas Taipale; Finland	Elmer Niklander; Finland	Emil Magnusson; Sweden

=== Weight throw ===
Games	Gold	Silver	Bronze
1904 St. Louis	Étienne Desmarteau; Canada	John Flanagan; United States	James Mitchell; United States
1908–1912	not included in the Olympic program		
1920 Antwerp	Pat McDonald; United States	Patrick Ryan; United States	Carl Johan Lind; Sweden

=== Javelin throw (freestyle) ===
Games	Gold	Silver	Bronze
1908 London	Eric Lemming; Sweden	Michalis Dorizas; Greece	Arne Halse; Norway

=== Javelin throw (two-handed) ===
This did not involve throwing with both hands. Distances recorded with each hand were added.

Games	Gold	Silver	Bronze
1912 Stockholm	Julius Saaristo (FIN)	Väinö Siikaniemi (FIN)	Urho Peltonen (FIN)

=== Triathlon ===
Consisted of long jump, shot put, and 100 yards.

Games	Gold	Silver	Bronze
1904 St. Louis	Max Emmerich (USA)	John Grieb (USA)	William Merz (USA)

=== Pentathlon ===
Consisted of long jump, javelin throw, 200 metres, discus throw, and 1500 metres.

Games	Gold	Silver	Bronze
1912 Stockholm	Jim Thorpe; United States	Ferdinand Bie; Norway; James Donahue; United States	Frank Lukeman; Canada
1920 Antwerp	Eero Lehtonen; Finland	Everett Bradley; United States	Hugo Lahtinen; Finland
1924 Paris	Eero Lehtonen; Finland	Elemér Somfay; Hungary	Robert LeGendre; United States

== See also ==
- Athletics at the 1906 Intercalated Games — these Intercalated Games are no longer regarded as official Games by the International Olympic Committee
- List of Asian Games medalists in athletics
- List of Commonwealth Games medallists in athletics (men)
- List of men's Olympic and World Championship athletics sprint champions
