= Athletics at the 1936 Summer Olympics =

Coordinates: 52.5147°N 13.2394°E

Athletics at the Games of the XI Olympiad
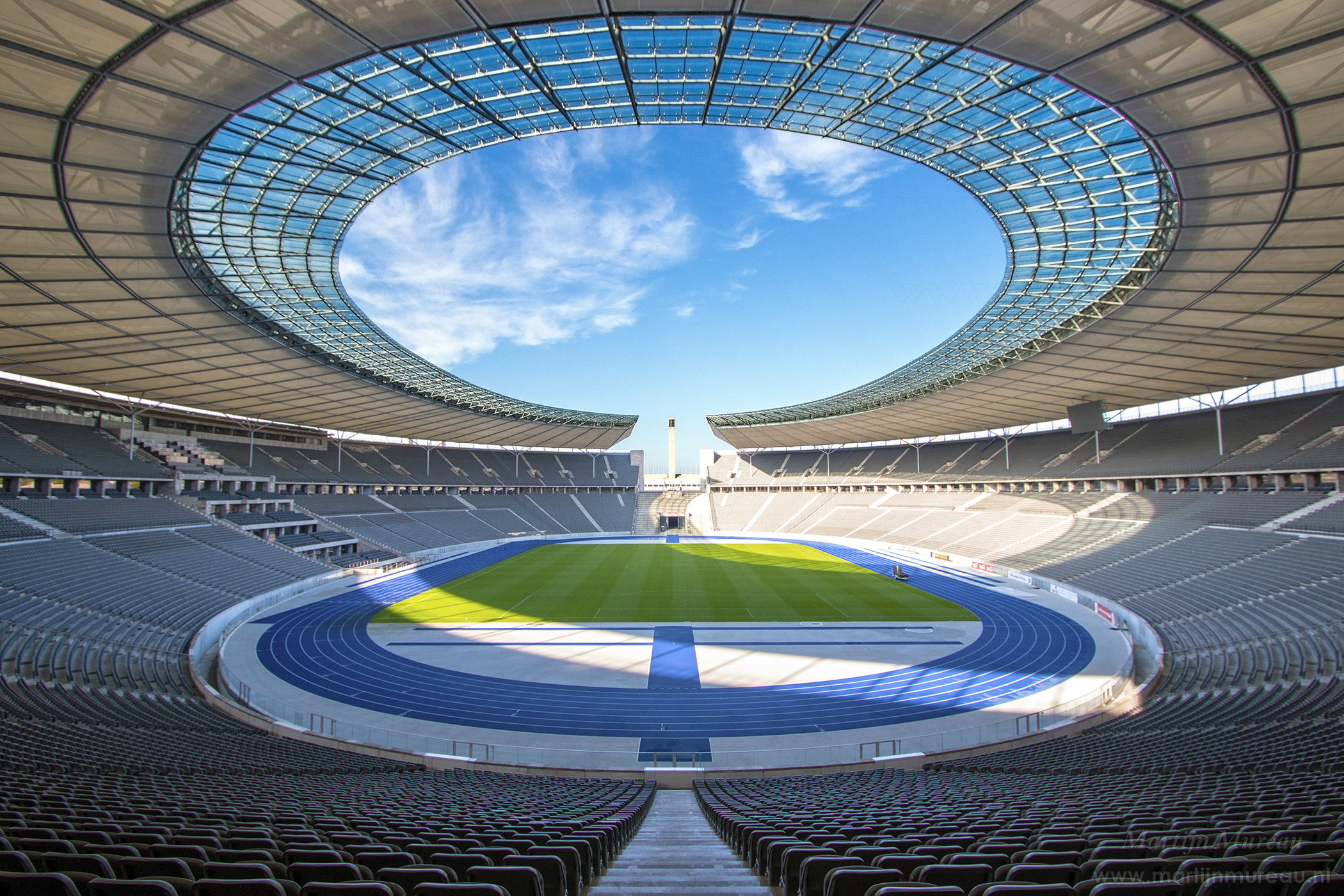
- The newly-built Olympiastadion (pictured in 2015) hosted the events
- No. of events: 29
- Competitors: 776 from 43 nations

At the 1936 Summer Olympics in Berlin, 29 athletics events were contested, 23 for men and 6 for women. The program of events was unchanged from the previous Games. There was a total of 776 participants from 43 countries competing.

== Medal summary ==
Rank	Nation	Gold	Silver	Bronze	Total
1	United States	14	7	4	25
2	Germany	5	4	7	16
3	Finland	3	5	2	10
4	Great Britain	2	5	0	7
5	Japan	2	2	3	7
6	Italy	1	2	2	5
7	Hungary	1	0	0	1
7	New Zealand	1	0	0	1
9	Poland	0	2	1	3
10	Canada	0	1	3	4
11	Switzerland	0	1	0	1
12	Netherlands	0	0	2	2
12	Sweden	0	0	2	2
14	Australia	0	0	1	1
14	Latvia	0	0	1	1
14	Philippines	0	0	1	1
Totals (16 entries)		29	29	29	87

=== Men ===
Event	Gold		Silver		Bronze	
100 metres	Jesse Owens; United States	10.3	Ralph Metcalfe; United States	10.4	Tinus Osendarp; Netherlands	10.5
200 metres	Jesse Owens; United States	20.7	Mack Robinson; United States	21.1	Tinus Osendarp; Netherlands	21.3
400 metres	Archie Williams; United States	46.5	Godfrey Brown; Great Britain	46.7	Jimmy LuValle; United States	46.8
800 metres	John Woodruff; United States	1:52.9	Mario Lanzi; Italy	1:53.3	Phil Edwards; Canada	1:53.6
1500 metres	Jack Lovelock; New Zealand	3:47.8	Glenn Cunningham; United States	3:48.4	Luigi Beccali; Italy	3:49.2
5000 metres	Gunnar Höckert; Finland	14:22.2	Lauri Lehtinen; Finland	14:25.8	Henry Jonsson; Sweden	14:29.0
10,000 metres	Ilmari Salminen; Finland	30:15.4	Arvo Askola; Finland	30:15.6	Volmari Iso-Hollo; Finland	30:20.2
110 metres hurdles	Forrest Towns; United States	14.2	Don Finlay; Great Britain	14.4	Fritz Pollard; United States	14.4
400 metres hurdles	Glenn Hardin; United States	52.4	John Loaring; Canada	52.7	Miguel White; Philippines	52.8
3000 metres steeplechase	Volmari Iso-Hollo; Finland	9:03.8	Kaarlo Tuominen; Finland	9:06.8	Alfred Dompert; Germany	9:07.2
4 × 100 metres relay	United States; Jesse Owens; Ralph Metcalfe; Foy Draper; Frank Wykoff	39.8	Italy; Orazio Mariani; Gianni Caldana; Elio Ragni; Tullio Gonnelli	41.1	Germany; Wilhelm Leichum; Erich Borchmeyer; Erwin Gillmeister; Gerd Hornberger	41.2
4 × 400 metres relay	Great Britain; Freddie Wolff; Godfrey Rampling; Bill Roberts; Godfrey Brown	3:09.0	United States; Harold Cagle; Robert Young; Edward O’Brien; Al Fitch	3:11.0	Germany; Helmut Hamann; Friedrich Von Stülpnagel; Harry Voigt; Rudolf Harbig	3:11.8
Marathon	Son Kitei; Japan	2:29:19.2	Ernest Harper; Great Britain	2:31:23.2	Nan Shoryu; Japan	2:31:42.0
50 kilometres walk	Harold Whitlock; Great Britain	4:30:41.4	Arthur Tell Schwab; Switzerland	4:32:09.2	Adalberts Bubenko; Latvia	4:32:42.2
High jump	Cornelius Johnson; United States	2.03 m	Dave Albritton; United States	2.00 m	Delos Thurber; United States	2.00 m
Pole vault	Earle Meadows; United States	4.35 m	Shuhei Nishida; Japan	4.25 m	Sueo Ōe; Japan	4.25 m
Long jump	Jesse Owens; United States	8.06 m	Luz Long; Germany	7.87 m	Naoto Tajima; Japan	7.74 m
Triple jump	Naoto Tajima; Japan	16.00 m	Masao Harada; Japan	15.66 m	Jack Metcalfe; Australia	15.50 m
Shot put	Hans Woellke; Germany	16.20 m	Sulo Bärlund; Finland	16.12 m	Gerhard Stöck; Germany	15.66 m
Discus throw	Ken Carpenter; United States	50.48 m	Gordon Dunn; United States	49.36 m	Giorgio Oberweger; Italy	49.23 m
Hammer throw	Karl Hein; Germany	56.49 m	Erwin Blask; Germany	55.04 m	Fred Warngård; Sweden	54.83 m
Javelin throw	Gerhard Stöck; Germany	71.84 m	Yrjö Nikkanen; Finland	70.77 m	Kalervo Toivonen; Finland	70.72 m
Decathlon	Glenn Morris; United States	7900	Bob Clark; United States	7601	Jack Parker; United States	7275

=== Women ===
Games	Gold		Silver		Bronze	
100 metres	Helen Stephens; United States	11.5	Stanisława Walasiewicz; Poland	11.7	Käthe Krauß; Germany	11.9
80 metres hurdles	Trebisonda Valla; Italy	11.7	Anni Steuer; Germany	11.7	Betty Taylor; Canada	11.7
4 × 100 metres relay	United States; Harriet Bland; Annette Rogers; Betty Robinson; Helen Stephens	46.9	Great Britain; Eileen Hiscock; Violet Olney; Audrey Brown; Barbara Burke	47.6	Canada; Dorothy Brookshaw; Mildred Dolson; Hilda Cameron; Aileen Meagher	47.8
High jump	Ibolya Csák; Hungary	1.60 m	Dorothy Odam; Great Britain	1.60 m	Elfriede Kaun; Germany	1.60 m
Discus throw	Gisela Mauermayer; Germany	47.63 m	Jadwiga Wajs; Poland	46.22 m	Paula Mollenhauer; Germany	39.80 m
Javelin throw	Tilly Fleischer; Germany	45.18 m	Luise Krüger; Germany	43.29 m	Maria Kwaśniewska; Poland	41.80 m

== Participating nations ==
- Afghanistan (2)
- Argentina (8)
- Australia (5)
- Austria (29)
- Belgium (14)
- Brazil (10)
- Bulgaria (2)
- Canada (30)
- Chile (10)
- Republic of China (22)
- Colombia (6)
- Czechoslovakia (30)
- Denmark (10)
- Egypt (5)
- Estonia (7)
- Finland (37)
- France (41)
- Germany (77)
- Great Britain (52)
- Greece (14)
- Hungary (25)
- Iceland (4)
- India (4)
- Italy (32)
- Japan (46)
- Latvia (7)
- Liechtenstein (2)
- Luxembourg (6)
- Malta (2)
- Mexico (3)
- Netherlands (18)
- New Zealand (3)
- Norway (11)
- Peru (9)
- Philippines (6)
- Poland (17)
- Portugal (2)
- Romania (5)
- South Africa (14)
- Spain (3)
- Sweden (38)
- Switzerland (22)
- United States (77)
- Yugoslavia (22)

== Records broken ==
20 new Olympic records and 6 new world records were set in the athletics events.

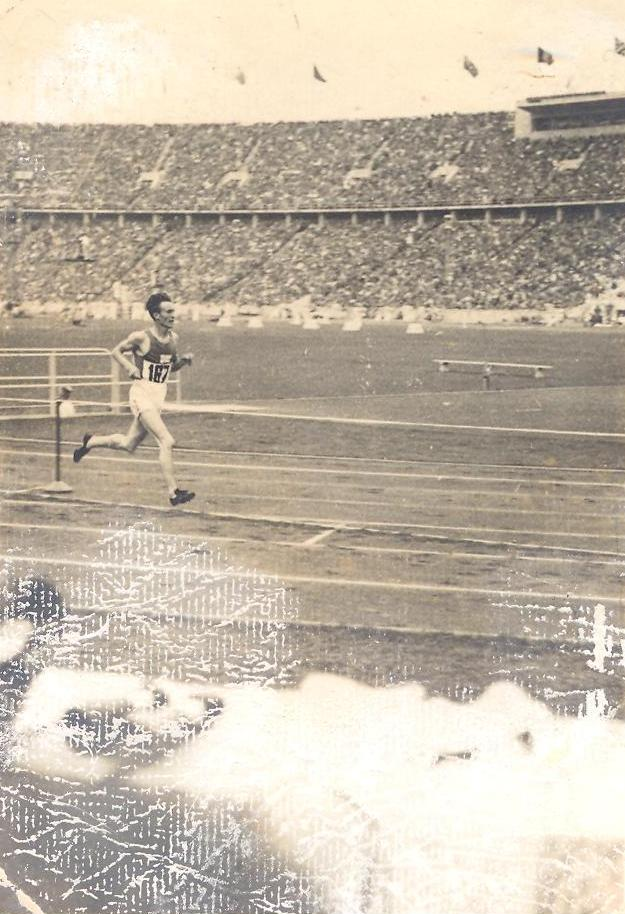
Volmari Iso-Hollo, 3000 m steeplechase, 1936 Summer Olympics

=== Men's Olympic and world records ===
Event	Date	Round	Name	Nationality	Result	OR	WR
200 metres	5 August	Final	Jesse Owens	United States	20.7	OR	
1500 meters	6 August	Final	Jack Lovelock	New Zealand	3:47.8	OR	WR
5000 metres	7 August	Final	Gunnar Höckert	Finland	14:22.2	OR	
110 metres hurdles	6 August	Semi-final	Forrest Towns	United States	14.1	OR	WR
3000 metres steeplechase	8 August	Final	Volmari Iso-Hollo	Finland	9:03.8	OR	
4 × 100 metres relay	9 August	Final	Jesse Owens; Ralph Metcalfe; Foy Draper; Frank Wykoff	United States	39.8	OR	WR
Marathon	9 August	Final	Son Kitei	Japan	2:29:19.2	OR	
50 kilometres walk	5 August	Final	Harold Whitlock	Great Britain	4:30:41.4	OR	
Long jump	4 August	Final	Jesse Owens	United States	8.06 m	OR	
Triple jump	6 August	Final	Naoto Tajima	Japan	16.00 m	OR	WR
High jump	2 August	Final	Cornelius Johnson	United States	2.03 m	OR	
Pole vault	5 August	Final	Earle Meadows	United States	4.35 m	OR	
Shot put	2 August	Final	Hans Woellke	Germany	16.20 m	OR	
Discus throw	5 August	Final	Ken Carpenter	United States	50.48 m	OR	
Hammer throw	3 August	Final	Karl Hein	Germany	56.49 m	OR	
Decathlon	8 August	Final	Glenn Morris	United States	7900	OR	WR

=== Women's Olympic and world records ===
Event	Date	Round	Name	Nationality	Result	OR	WR
80 metres hurdles	5 August	Semi-final	Trebisonda Valla	Italy	11.6	OR	
4 × 100 metres relay	8 August	Heats	Emmy Albus; Käthe Krauß; Marie Dollinger; Ilse Dörffeldt	Germany	46.4	OR	WR
Discus throw	4 August	Final	Gisela Mauermayer	Germany	47.63 m	OR	
Javelin throw	2 August	Final	Tilly Fleischer	Germany	45.18 m	OR	
