= Athletics at the 1936 Summer Olympics – Men's 4 × 400 metres relay =

Men's 4 × 400 metres relay at the Games of the XI Olympiad
- Venue: Olympiastadion: Berlin, Germany
- Dates: August 8, 1936 (heats), August 9, 1936 (final)
- Competitors: from 12 nations
- Teams: 12
- Winning time: 3:09.0

Medalists
1st place, gold medalist(s)		Freddie Wolff; Godfrey Rampling; Bill Roberts; Godfrey Brown	Great Britain
2nd place, silver medalist(s)		Harold Cagle; Robert Young; Edward O'Brien; Alfred Fitch	United States
3rd place, bronze medalist(s)		Helmut Hamann; Friedrich Von Stülpnagel; Harry Voigt; Rudolf Harbig	Germany

The men's 4 × 400 metres relay event at the 1936 Olympic Games took place on August 8 and 9.

== Results ==
=== Heats ===
The fastest two teams in each of the three heats advanced to the final round.

=== Heat 1 ===
Rank	Country	Athletes	Time
1	United States	Harold Cagle, Bob Young, Eddie O'Brien, Al Fitch	3:13.0
2	Hungary	Tibor Ribényi, Zoltán Zsitva, József Vadas, József Kovács	3:17.0
3	Poland	Tadeusz Śliwak, Antoni Maszewski, Kazimierz Kucharski, Klemens Biniakowski	3:17.6
4	Japan	Toyoyi Aihara, Masao Ichihara, Seiken Cho, Hiroyoshi Kubota	3:18.4

=== Heat 2 ===
Rank	Country	Athletes	Time
1	Great Britain	Freddie Wolff, Godfrey Rampling, Bill Roberts, Godfrey Brown (Note: Some contemporary newspapers listed Jack Powell as a runner for Great Britain in the heats instead of Wolff.)	3:14.4
2	Sweden	Sven Strömberg, Per-Olof Edfeldt, Olle Danielsson, Bertil von Wachenfeldt	3:14.6
3	France	Raymond Boisset, Georges Guillez, Georges Henry, Prudent Joye	3:15.2

=== Heat 3 ===
Rank	Country	Athletes	Time
1	Germany	Helmut Hamann, Friedrich von Stülpnagel, Harry Voigt, Rudolf Harbig	3:15.0
2	Canada	Marshall Limon, Phil Edwards, Bill Fritz, Johnny Loaring	3:15.0
3	Italy	Angelo Ferrario, Marsilio Rossi, Otello Spampani, Mario Lanzi	3:16.6
4	South Africa	Willie Botha, Frank Rushton, William Lindeque, Dennis Shore	3:17.8
5	Czechoslovakia	Heinz Lorenz, Evžen Rošický, Břetislav Krátký, Karel Kněnický	3:22.2

=== Final ===
Rank	Country	Athletes	Time
1st place, gold medalist(s)	Great Britain	Freddie Wolff, Godfrey Rampling, Bill Roberts, Godfrey Brown	3:09.0
2nd place, silver medalist(s)	United States	Harold Cagle, Bob Young, Eddie O'Brien, Al Fitch	3:11.0
3rd place, bronze medalist(s)	Germany	Helmut Hamann, Friedrich von Stülpnagel, Harry Voigt, Rudolf Harbig	3:11.8
4	Canada	Marshall Limon, Phil Edwards, Bill Fritz, Johnny Loaring	3:11.8
5	Sweden	Sven Strömberg, Per-Olof Edfeldt, Olle Danielsson, Bertil von Wachenfeldt	3:13.0
6	Hungary	Tibor Ribényi, Zoltán Zsitva, József Vadas, József Kovács	3:14.8
