= Edfeldt =

Edfeldt is a surname. Notable people with the surname include:

- Per-Olof Edfeldt, Swedish sprinter
- Tove Edfeldt (born 1983), Swedish actress
