= Antoni Maszewski =

Polish sprinter

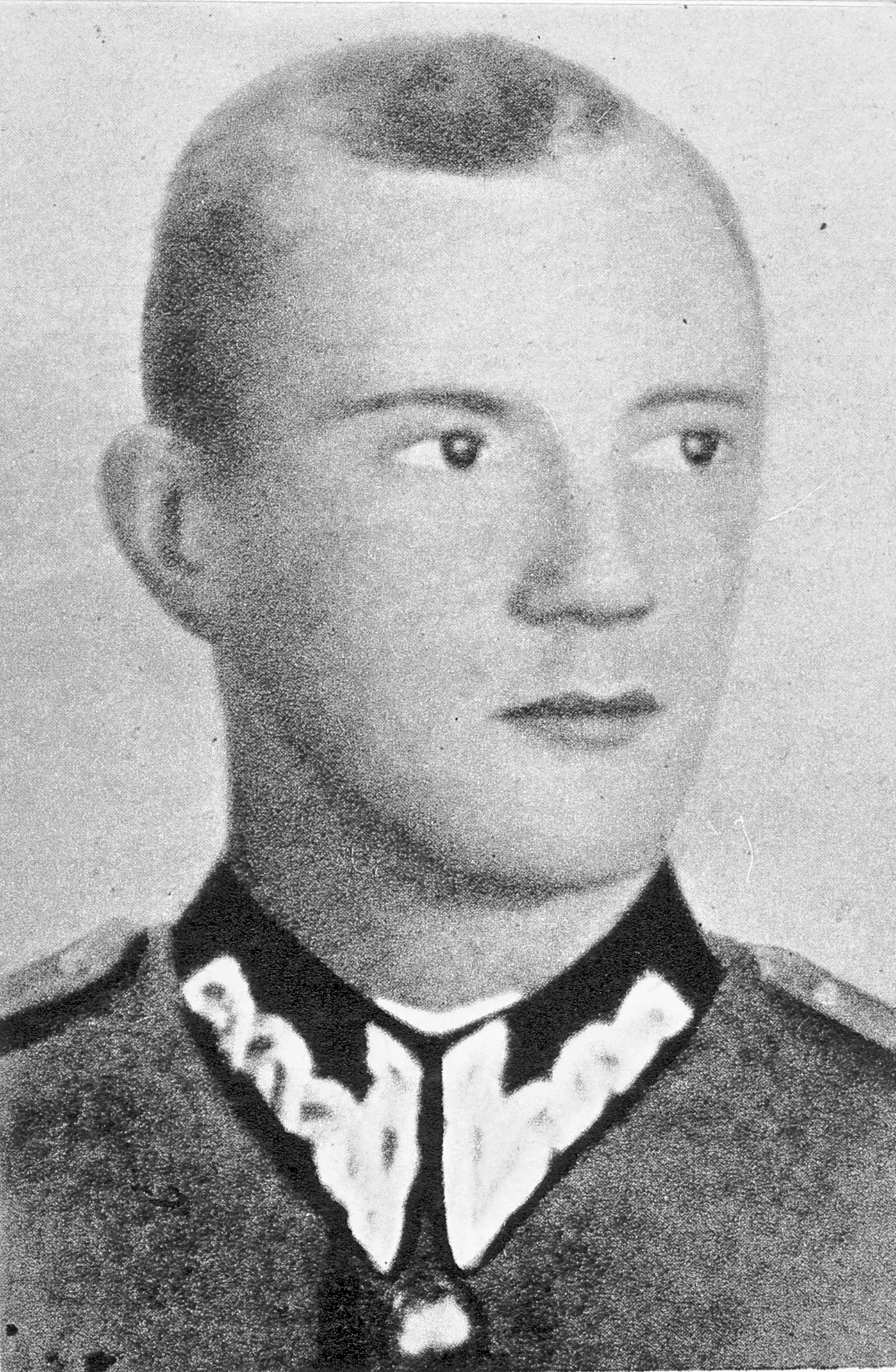
- Maszewski in the 1930s

Personal information
- Nationality: Polish
- Born: 5 May 1908 Kamieńsk, Poland
- Died: 5 August 1944 (aged 36) Falconara Marittima, Italy

Sport
- Sport: Sprinting
- Event: 4 × 400 metres relay

Antoni Maszewski (5 May 1908 – 5 August 1944) was a Polish sprinter. He competed in the men's 4 × 400 metres relay at the 1936 Summer Olympics. He was killed in action during World War II.
