= William Lindeque =

South African sprinter

Personal information
- Nationality: South African
- Born: 13 December 1910
- Died: 26 June 1995 (aged 84)

Sport
- Sport: Sprinting
- Event: 4 × 400 metres relay

William Lindeque (13 December 1910 – 26 June 1995) was a South African sprinter. He competed in the men's 4 × 400 metres relay at the 1936 Summer Olympics.
