= Otello Spampani =

Italian sprinter

Personal information
- Nationality: Italian
- Born: 18 February 1918
- Died: 1 May 1975 (aged 57)

Sport
- Sport: Sprinting
- Event: 4 × 400 metres relay

Otello Spampani (18 February 1918 – 1 May 1975) was an Italian sprinter. He competed in the men's 4 × 400 metres relay at the 1936 Summer Olympics.
