= Heinz Lorenz (athlete) =

Heinz Helmut Lorenz (26 November 1915 – 15 November 2013) was a Czechoslovak-German athlete who competed for Czechoslovakia in the 1936 Summer Olympics in Berlin, Germany. He was born in Litoměřice. He competed with the Czechoslovak team in the Men's 4 x 400 meters relay, but did not advance beyond the preliminary round, his team placing fifth and last. He died in November 2013 at the age of 97 in Geretsried.
