= Garry Cook =

Garry Cook may refer to:

- Garry Cook (runner) (born 1958), British runner
- Garry Cook (sports executive), British sports executive

== See also ==
- Gary Cooke, Irish actor, satirist and writer
- Gary Cooke (footballer) (born 1958), Australian rules footballer
