= Tadeusz Śliwak =

Polish sprinter

Personal information
- Nationality: Polish
- Born: 20 November 1908 Buczacz, Galicia, Austria-Hungary
- Died: 26 February 1991 (aged 82) Winnipeg, Manitoba, Canada

Sport
- Sport: Sprinting
- Event: 4 × 400 metres relay

Tadeusz Śliwak (20 November 1908 – 26 February 1991) was a Polish sprinter. He competed in the men's 4 × 400 metres relay at the 1936 Summer Olympics.

He served with the Polish Air Force at the beginning of the World War II and later made his way to England to serve with the 307th Polish Night-Fighter Squadron as a navigator. He was attached to the RAF from 1941 to 1945. After spending six years in Argentina, he immigrated to Winnipeg and married Dorothy Constable. He was employed with Canada Post until his retirement in 1974. Śliwak was a multi-linguist and translated during the Pan-American Games held in Winnipeg, as well as for various organisations in the city over the years.
