= Hiroyoshi Kubota =

Japanese sprinter

Personal information
- Nationality: Japanese
- Born: 29 April 1913
- Died: c. 2002
- Height: 168 cm (5 ft 6 in)
- Weight: 53 kg (117 lb)

Sport
- Sport: Sprinting
- Event: 400 metres

Hiroyoshi Kubota (窪田 博芳, Kubota Hiroyoshi; born 29 April 1913, died c. 2002) was a Japanese sprinter. He competed in the men's 400 metres at the 1936 Summer Olympics.

He won three times the national title in the 4x400 metre relay with the Waseda University team.

He studied at the Waseda University. His death was reported in a 2002 bulletin published by the Japan Inter-University Athletics Union.
