= Tibor Ribényi =

Hungarian sprinter

Personal information
- Nationality: Hungarian
- Born: 25 November 1914
- Died: 11 May 1981 (aged 67)

Sport
- Sport: Sprinting
- Event: 400 metres

Tibor Ribényi (25 November 1914 – 11 May 1981) was a Hungarian sprinter. He competed in the men's 400 metres at the 1936 Summer Olympics.
