= Per-Olof Edfeldt =

Swedish sprinter

Personal information
- Nationality: Swedish
- Born: 1 November 1914
- Died: 16 June 1988 (aged 73)

Sport
- Sport: Sprinting
- Event: 4 × 400 metres relay

Per-Olof Edfeldt (1 November 1914 – 16 June 1988) was a Swedish sprinter. He competed in the men's 4 × 400 metres relay at the 1936 Summer Olympics.
