= Gary Cooke (footballer) =

Australian rules footballer

Personal information
- Full name: Gary Cooke
- Born: 10 November 1958 (age 67)
- Original team: Springvale
- Height: 174 cm (5 ft 9 in)
- Weight: 71 kg (157 lb)

Playing career^{1}
Years	Club	Games (Goals)
1978	Melbourne	7 (3)
- ^{1} Playing statistics correct to the end of 1978.

Gary Cooke (born 10 November 1958) is a former Australian rules footballer who played with Melbourne in the Victorian Football League (VFL).
