= Helmut Hamann =

German sprinter (1912–1941)

Medal record

Men's athletics

Representing Germany

Olympic Games
Bronze medal – third place	1936 Berlin	4×400 m

Representing Germany

European Championships
Gold medal – first place	1934 Turin	4×400 m

Helmut Hamann (31 August 1912 – 22 June 1941) was a German athlete from Berlin who competed mainly in the 400 metres.

Hamann competed for Germany in the 1936 Summer Olympics held in Berlin, Germany in the 4 × 400 metre relay where he won the bronze medal with his teammates Friedrich von Stülpnagel, Harry Voigt and Rudolf Harbig.

Hamann was killed in Siedliszcze in Poland during fighting on the Eastern Front of World War II.
