= Al Fitch =

American sprinter (1912–1981)

Medal record

Men's athletics

Representing the United States

Olympic Games
Silver medal – second place	1936 Berlin	4x400 m relay

Alfred Lord Fitch (December 1, 1912 – February 17, 1981) was an American athlete who competed mainly in the 400 metres.

He was born in New York. He was an All-American sprinter for the USC Trojans track and field team, finishing runner-up in the 400 m at the 1936 NCAA Track and Field Championships.

He competed for the United States in the 1936 Summer Olympics held in Berlin, Germany in the 4 x 400 metre relay where he won the silver medal with his teammates Harold Cagle, Robert Young and Edward O’Brien.

He died in Orange, California in 1981.
