= Edward O'Brien (sprinter) =

American sprinter (1914–1976)

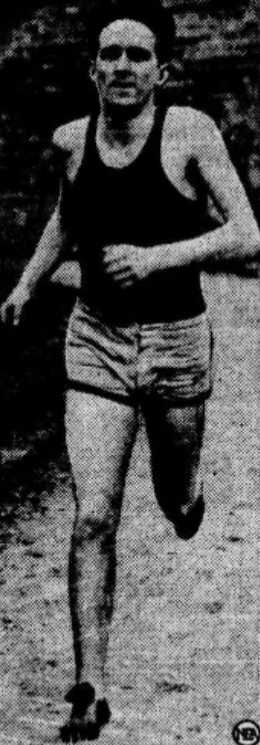

Medal record

Men's athletics

Representing the United States

Olympic Games
Silver medal – second place	1936 Berlin	4x400 m relay

Edward Thomas O'Brien (September 12, 1914 – September 15, 1976) was an American runner who competed mainly in the 400 meters. He competed for the United States in the 1936 Summer Olympics held in Berlin, Germany, in the 4 × 400 meter relay, where he won the silver medal with his teammates Harold Cagle, Robert Young and Alfred Fitch.

O'Brien was All-American in the 400 meters three years in a row. He graduated from Syracuse University in 1937, and was inducted into the Syracuse Hall of Fame, with his trophies on display there. He married Florence Quintin in 1937. He enlisted in the United States Navy in December 1941, serving on a destroyer in the South Pacific.

He had one child, Edward T. O'Brien Jr., a psychologist who resides in Clearwater, Florida. O'Brien died on September 15, 1976, of colon cancer after living for several years at his home in Bermuda.
