= Harold Cagle =

American sprinter (1913–1977)

Medal record

Men's athletics

Representing the United States

Olympic Games
Silver medal – second place	1936 Berlin	4x400 m relay

Harold D. Cagle (August 3, 1913 – November 28, 1977) was an American athlete who competed mainly in the 400 metres.

He competed for the United States in the 1936 Summer Olympics held in Berlin, Germany in the 4 x 400 metre relay where he won the silver medal with his teammates Robert Young, Edward O’Brien and Alfred Fitch.

== Biography ==
Harold D. Cagle was born in Maud, Pottawatomie County, Oklahoma, August 3, 1913 to Homer and Augusta B. Cagle. He had a brother Jay W. and a sister Billie J. His father was in the insurance business. He was a top track star at Maud High School until his family moved to Shawnee, the county seat, for him to finish high school. He was a 1933 Shawnee High School graduate.

He won the state championship in the 440 run in 1933. He began college at Oklahoma Baptist University in Shawnee and competed on the Bison track team. He was clocked at 46.5 in the 440 and through a series of national events qualified for the 1936 U.S. Olympic team. After his success in the Berlin Olympics Cagle returned to OBU where he set several records that endured for many years. After graduation, he served with the U.S. Army beginning May 13, 1941. Cagle taught school and coached track at Marysville, California High School until he retired.

He died November 28, 1977, in Fremont, California at age 64, of an apparent heart attack. He is buried at Sierra View Memorial Park, Olivehurst, California.
