= Harry Voigt =

German sprinter

Medal record

Men's athletics

Representing Germany

Olympic Games
Bronze medal – third place	1936 Berlin	4×400 m

Representing Germany

European Championships
Gold medal – first place	1934 Turin	4×400 m

Harry Voigt (15 June 1913 – 29 October 1986) was a German athlete who competed mainly in the 400 metres.

Voigt was born in Berlin. He competed for Germany in the 1936 Summer Olympics held in Berlin, Germany in the 4 × 400 metre relay where he won the bronze medal with his teammates Helmut Hamann, Friedrich von Stülpnagel and Rudolf Harbig. He died in Barver, Diepholz, Lower Saxony.
