= Robert Young (sprinter) =

Medal record

Men's athletics

Representing the United States

Olympic Games
Silver medal – second place	1936 Berlin	4x400 m relay

Robert Clark "Bob" Young (January 15, 1916 – February 3, 2011) was an American athlete who competed mainly in the 400 metres. He competed for the United States in the 1936 Summer Olympics held in Berlin, Germany, in the 4×400 metre relay where he won the silver medal with his teammates Harold Cagle, Edward O’Brien and Alfred Fitch. He was the youngest member of the team. In college sports, Young competed for UCLA. He was born and died in Bakersfield, California.
