= Godfrey Rampling =

British army officer and Olympic medalist (1909–2009)

- Rampling in 1934

Medal record

Men's athletics

Representing Great Britain

Olympic Games
Gold medal – first place	1936 Berlin	4 × 400 metres
Silver medal – second place	1932 Los Angeles	4 × 400 metres

Representing England

British Empire Games
Gold medal – first place	1934 London	440 yards
Gold medal – first place	1934 London	4 × 440 yards

Godfrey Lionel Rampling (14 May 1909 – 20 June 2009) was an English athlete and army officer who competed for Great Britain in the 1932 Summer Olympics and in the 1936 Summer Olympics. He turned 100 on 14 May 2009 and was the oldest living British Olympian at the time of his death.

== Life and career ==
Rampling was born in Blackheath, London, the son of Gertrude Anne (Taylor) and Horace Johnson Rampling, a costumier. After attending the Royal Military Academy, Woolwich, he was commissioned as a second lieutenant in the Royal Artillery in 1929. In 1932 he was promoted to lieutenant. Rampling won the British AAA championships 440 yards title at the 1931 AAA Championships and the 1934 AAA Championships.

At the 1932 Summer Olympics, Rampling was fourth in his semifinal in the individual 400 metre event and did not reach the final, but ran the anchor leg to help the British 4 × 400 m relay team win the silver medal, behind the United States.

At the 1934 British Empire Games in London, Rampling won the 440 yd (400 m), and helped the English 4 × 440 yards relay team to capture the gold medal.

At the 1936 Berlin Olympics, Rampling was again fourth in the semifinals of 400 metre competition and ran the second leg on the British 4 × 400 m relay team which won the gold medal.

Rampling was a Lieutenant Colonel in the Royal Artillery, attached to NATO, until retiring in 1958 after 29 years' service.

He married Isabel Anne (née Gurteen; 1918–2001); their younger daughter Charlotte became a noted model and film actress. Their eldest daughter Sarah committed suicide in 1967.

He was, as of October 2007, the last surviving male athletics medallist from the 1932 Summer Olympics and the last male gold medallist in athletics from the 1936 Summer Olympics.

Rampling was Britain's oldest living Olympic Gold medallist and also oldest living Olympic competitor. He celebrated his centenary with his family on 14 May 2009 at Bushey in Hertfordshire.

Rampling died in his sleep aged 100 on 20 June 2009.
