= Friedrich von Stülpnagel =

German sprinter

Olympic medal record

Men's athletics

Representing Germany
Bronze medal – third place	1936 Berlin	4 × 400 metre relay

Friedrich Gottlob von Stülpnagel (16 July 1913 – 7 July 1996) was a German track and field athlete who competed mainly in the 400 metres.

Stülpnagel was born in Lichterfelde in the German capital of Berlin. He was the son of Ferdinand Wolf von Stülpnagel (1873–1938) and Martha von Wietersheim (1885–1959), herself the granddaughter of Joseph Azarian and the great-granddaughter of Osmer Abner Bingham of Boston, MA. Ferdinand Wolf von Stülpnagel was chamberlain of the court administration of the Crown Prince. His family, the von Stülpnagel, were members of the German lower nobility.

In Munich on 26 May 1939, Stülpnagel married Dagmar Reinhard (born 25 January 1919), the daughter of Major Hugo Reinhard and Ella Lucke. The marriage ended in divorce in Freiburg on 25 March 1947. Reinhard later married the factory owner Horst Gütermann (born 19 June 1922 in Freiburg).

In Geisenheim on 22 May 1947, Stülpnagel married the Geisenheim native Lucia Luise Gräfin von Ingelheim gen. Echterin von und zu Mespelbrunn (25 December 1917 – 3 June 1958). Lucia Luise was the daughter of Philipp Rudolf Graf von Ingelheim, Archchamberlain of the Duchy of Nassau, and Leopoldine Schenk Gräfin von Stauffenberg.

Stülpnagel competed for Nazi Germany in the 1936 Summer Olympics held in Berlin in the 4 × 400 metre relay where he won the bronze medal with his teammates Helmut Hamann, Harry Voigt and Rudolf Harbig. He also started for the sports club MSV Wünsdorf; in his matches he was 1.87 metres tall and weighed 70 kilograms.

Stülpnagel later became an officer in the German Army, serving as an Oberst in the Bundeswehr after World War II. He died in Munich, Bavaria.
