= Rudolf Harbig =

German middle-distance runner

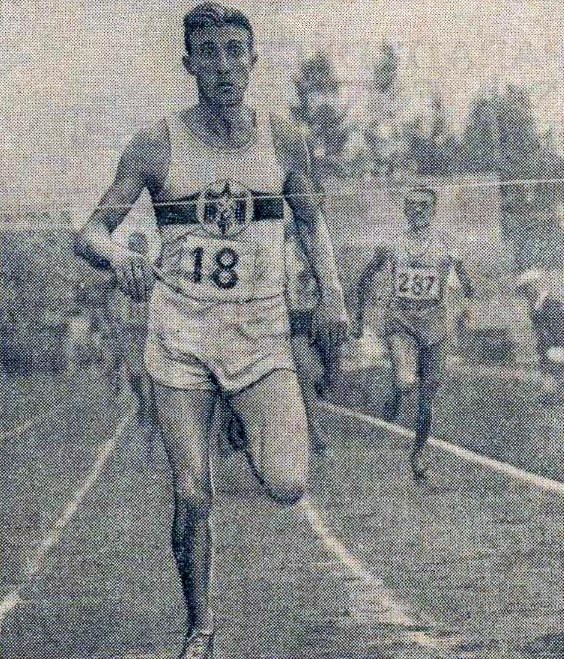
- Harbig during a track event in Frankfurt (Oder), May 1940

Personal information
- Born: 8 November 1913 Dresden, Saxony, German Empire
- Died: 5 March 1944 (aged 30) Olkhovets, Zvenyhorodka Raion, Soviet Union (now Ukraine)

Sport
- Club: Dresdner SC; Eintracht Braunschweig
Medal record
Men's athletics
Representing Germany
Olympic Games
Bronze medal – third place	1936 Berlin	4×400 m
European Championships
Gold medal – first place	1938 Paris	800 m
Gold medal – first place	1938 Paris	4×400 m

Rudolf Waldemar Harbig (8 November 1913 – 5 March 1944) was a German athlete. As a middle-distance runner, he held two world records in the 800 metres and 400 metres. He died while serving as a sergeant in Nazi Germany's military during World War II.

== Life ==
Harbig was born in Dresden, the son of a stoker. From an early age, he joined local sports clubs as an amateur runner and handball player. Having finished school, he began an apprenticeship as a wheelwright but did not obtain an employment due to the Great Depression. Instead he set out as a wandering journeyman, traveling throughout Germany. Back in Dresden, to make a living, he joined the Reichswehr armed forces in 1932.

Harbig, as a professional soldier, continued to participate in track events. On 24 June 1934, he competed in an 800 metres event at the Dresdner SC stadium, won, and was asked to join the preparations for the 1936 Summer Olympics in Berlin. He began a comprehensive interval training supervised by the Dresdner SC officials and athletics coach Josef Waitzer. In summer 1935 he left the military to concentrate on his sporting career, while he still had to take on part-time jobs to earn money.

=== Olympian athlete ===
In July 1936, Harbig won the 800 metres final at the German Athletics Championships at the Mommsenstadion in Berlin, ahead of his toughest rival Wolfgang Dessecker, and obtained the permission to start at the Summer Olympics in August. After three weeks of intensive training, he fell ill with a gastrointestinal infections. So weakened, he arrived in the Berlin Olympiastadion and took a disappointing sixth place in the first heat of the 800 metres, defeated by Canadian Olympian Phil Edwards. Contrary to some official's concerns, he nevertheless stood as a member of the German 4 × 400 metres relay team, together with Friedrich von Stülpnagel, Helmut Hamann, and Harry Voigt. They established themselves in the preliminaries and won the bronze medal in the finals on August 9. Harbig was the final runner, closely followed by Canadian athlete John Loaring.

On 1 May 1937 Harbig joined the Nazi Party, he also held the rank of a Sturmmann of the SA paramilitary forces. He regularly participated in the Party's Struggle Games during the Nuremberg Rallies and voluntarily served the propaganda purposes of Nazi sports official Karl Ritter von Halt. This was coupled with his ultimate rise to the top of German athletics, moving from victory to victory. In July he won the 800 metres at the German Athletics Championships for the second time, equalling the eleven-year-old German record of Otto Peltzer, and one week later made another German best time in the 400 metres at the Berlin Olympiastadion.

One year later Harbig won the 400 metres at the ISTAF Berlin and again the 800 metres at the German Championships at the Hermann–Göring–Stadion in Breslau. On September 4 he defeated his long-time rival Mario Lanzi from Italy at the 1938 European Championships in Athletics in Paris over 800 m in a time of 1:50.6 min. At the same championships he won the gold medal with the German 4 × 400 m relay team.

In the same summer the British runner Sydney Wooderson had set a remarkable new world record over 800 m at 1:48.4 min. When, in 1939, Harbig set a new national record of 1:49.4 he knew that the world record was not an unrealistic prospect. However, in the same season, Mario Lanzi ran a time of 1:49.5 in Pisa. The two rivals met in Milan in July for a much-celebrated race over 800 m on a 500 m-track. In his usual manner Lanzi took the lead and was still in front on the final bend. However, at the start of the 125 m-home-straight Harbig overtook him with an astonishing sprint. He finished with a new world record of 1:46.6 min. Lanzi, behind him, set a new Italian record of 1:49.0.

In the following years Harbig's time turned out to be a very hard record to break. Even track legends Arthur Wint and Mal Whitfield could not threaten it. Not until August 1955 the Belgian runner Roger Moens could set a new world record of 1:45.7. Also, in 1939 Harbig set a world record over 400 m on a 500 m-track in Frankfurt in 46.0 sec. In Dresden in 1941 he set a world record over 1000 m in 2:21.5.

=== World War II and death ===
Harbig's career declined upon the outbreak of World War II in September 1939, whereafter he lost many of his training possibilities. Urged by Nazi official Hans von Tschammer und Osten and Guido von Mengden, Harbig joined the Wehrmacht forces in occupied Poland, while he still prepared for the 1940 Summer Olympics. In the winter of 1940-41 he was drafted to the Fallschirmjäger (paratrooper) forces at the Broitzem airbase in Braunschweig. On 24 May 1941 he set another world record over 800 metres at the Ilgen-Kampfbahn in Dresden.

Later in 1941, Harbig was sent to the Eastern Front and fought in the Battle of Moscow. During the Soviet Dnieper–Carpathian Offensive against the Wehrmacht Army Group South, he was killed fighting with the 2nd Parachute Division at the Voronezh Front near Kirovohrad, Ukraine in 1944. Holding the rank of Feldwebel (Sergeant) at the time, he served in Fallschirmjäger-Regiment 6 under the command of Hauptmann (Captain) Friedrich August von der Heydte as a platoon leader. The exact circumstances of his death are not known.

Records
Preceded by (United Kingdom) Sydney Wooderson	Men's 800 metres World Record Holder; 15 June 1939 – 3 August 1955	Succeeded by (Belgium) Roger Moens
Preceded by (United Kingdom) Godfrey Brown	European Record Holder Men's 400 m 12 August 1939 - 24 June 1955	Succeeded by (Soviet Union) Ardalion Ignatyev
Preceded by (United Kingdom) Sydney Wooderson	European Record Holder Men's 800 m 17 July 1939 - 3 August 1955	Succeeded by (Belgium) Roger Moens

== Sources ==
- Wallechinsky, David (2004). The Complete Book of the Summer Olympics, Toronto: Sport Classic Books. ISBN 1-894963-34-2
