= Athletics at the 1936 Summer Olympics – Women's high jump =

Women's high jump at the Games of the XI Olympiad
- Dates: August 9, 1936

Medalists
| 1st place, gold medalist(s) | | Ibolya Csák; Hungary |
| 2nd place, silver medalist(s) | | Dorothy Odam; Great Britain |
| 3rd place, bronze medalist(s) | | Elfriede Kaun; Germany |

The women's high jump event was part of the track and field athletics programme at the 1936 Summer Olympics. The competition was held on August 9, 1936. The final was won by Ibolya Csák of Hungary.

Gretel Bergmann, a German Jewish athlete, was prevented from competing by the Nazis, although having a personal best of 1.60 m. She was not replaced by a substitute, with Germany having only two athletes in the competition. Dora Ratjen, who finished tied fourth, later revealed she was a boy raised as a girl.

== Results ==
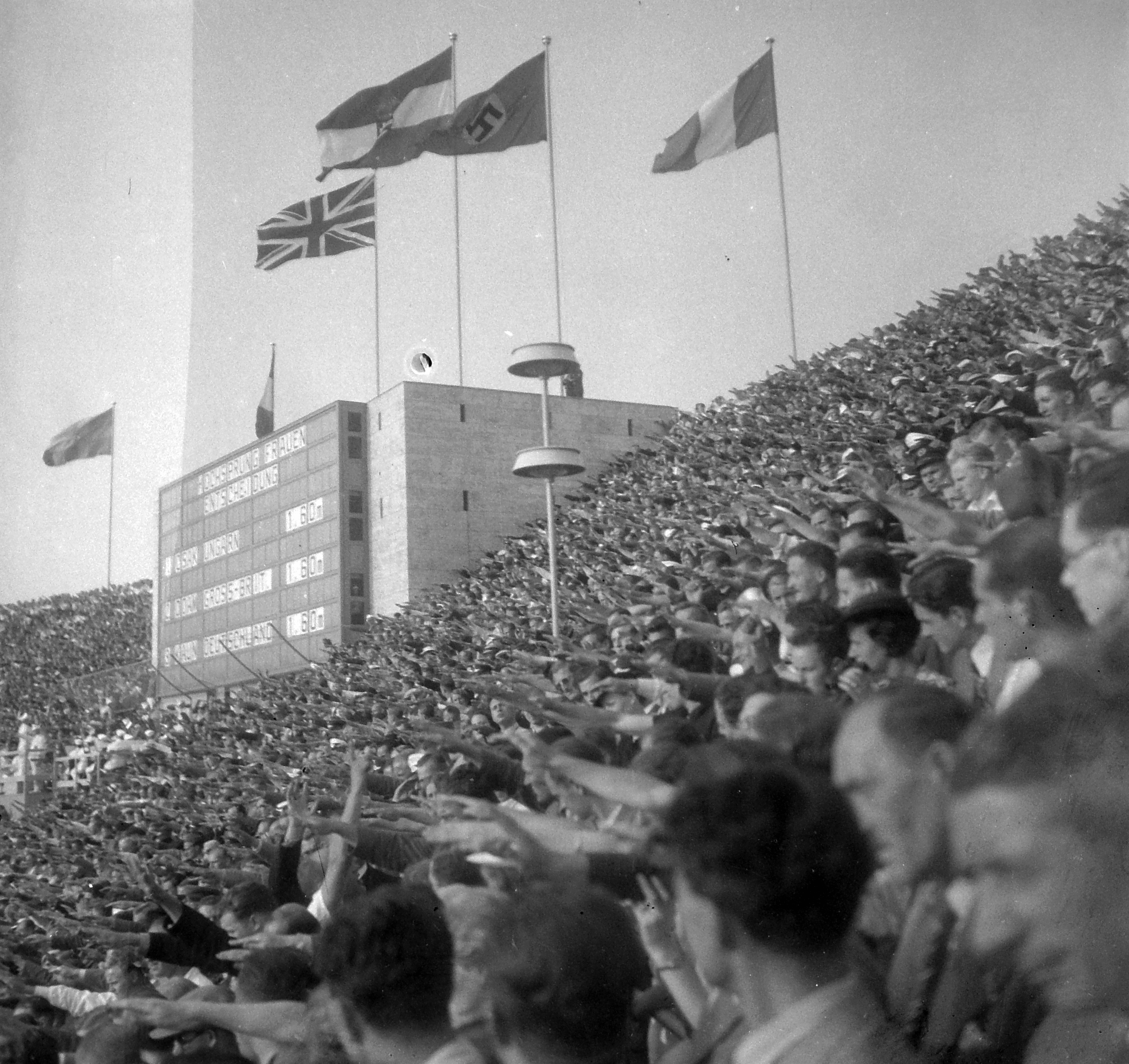
Crowd showing the Nazi salute with the results of the women's high jump event visible on the board in the background

=== Final standings ===
| Rank | Name | Nationality | Height |
|---|---|---|---|
| 1st place, gold medalist(s) | Ibolya Csák | Hungary | 1.60 |
| 2nd place, silver medalist(s) | Dorothy Odam | Great Britain | 1.60 |
| 3rd place, bronze medalist(s) | Elfriede Kaun | Germany | 1.60 |
| 4 | Dora Ratjen | Germany | 1.58 |
| 4 | Marguerite Nicolas | France | 1.58 |
| 6 | Fanny Blankers-Koen | Netherlands | 1.55 |
| 6 | Annette Rogers | United States | 1.55 |
| 6 | Doris Carter | Australia | 1.55 |
| 9 | Alice Arden | United States | 1.50 |
| 9 | Kathlyn Kelley | United States | 1.50 |
| 9 | Margaret Bell | Canada | 1.50 |
| 9 | Wanda Nowak | Austria | 1.50 |
| 9 | Nellie Carrington | Great Britain | 1.50 |
| 14 | Catherine Stevens | Belgium | 1.40 |
| 14 | Tini Koopmans | Netherlands | 1.40 |
| 14 | Junko Nishida | Japan | 1.40 |
| 17 | Irja Lipasti | Finland | 1.30 |
