= Collision (2013 film) =

- DVD cover
- Directed by: David Marconi
- Written by: David Marconi
- Produced by: Luc Besson
- Starring: Roschdy Zem; Frank Grillo; Jaimie Alexander; Marie-Josée Croze; Moussa Maaskri; Charlie Bewley
- Cinematography: Thomas Hardmeier
- Edited by: Julien Rey
- Music by: Richard Horowitz
- Production company: EuropaCorp
- Distributed by: EuropaCorp
- Release date: January 30, 2013 (France)
- Running time: 101 minutes
- Country: France
- Languages: English; Arabic; French
- Box office: €307,416 (Worldwide)

Collision (a.k.a. Intersections) is an English-language French romantic thriller film written and directed by American filmmaker David Marconi, produced by Luc Besson and starring Frank Grillo, Jaimie Alexander, Roschdy Zem, Marie-Josée Croze and Charlie Bewley. The film was released in France on January 30, 2013.

== Plot ==
Taylor and Scott Dolan (Jaimie Alexander and Frank Grillo) are on their honeymoon in Morocco where Taylor plots to kill her rich husband with help from her lover, Travis (Charlie Bewley). The plan goes awry when all parties are involved in a bloody car accident on a remote desert road. They escape the multi-car pileup at a desert intersection and encounter the group of survivors, including a wanted smuggler, Omar (Moussa Maaskri), a French woman, Audrey (Marie-Josée Croze), with a sick baby and Saleh, a mysterious "repairman" (Roschdy Zem). They embark on a journey of deceit and revelation that culminates in the medina of Essaouira.

== Cast ==
- Roschdy Zem as Saleh
- Frank Grillo as Scott Dolan
- Jaimie Alexander as Taylor Dolan
- Marie-Josée Croze as Audrey
- Moussa Maaskri as Omar
- Charlie Bewley as Travis
- Affif Ben Badra as Ayub
- Carlos Leal as Cyril
- Gabriella Wright as Odette

== Production ==
=== Development ===
Collision marks David Marconi's return to directing, twenty years after The Harvest. Brooklyn Decker and Gemma Arterton were considered for role of Taylor but lost out to Jaimie Alexander.

=== Filming ===
Filming started in February 2012 on location in Merzouga and Essaouira, Morocco and lasted a month and a half, with most of the shooting done in sequence. The film was shot mainly in English, however there is also a substantial amount of Arabic dialogue between Moussa Maaskri and Roschdy Zem's characters as well as some French dialogue, involving Zem's, Marie-Josée Croze's and Carlos Leal's characters. The key car crash scene was filmed practically, without visual effects, using DSLR cameras in the cars.

== Soundtrack ==
The soundtrack was composed by Richard Horowitz.

The opening sequence tracks are sung by Sussan Deyhim.

== Release ==
Initially set for November 2012, the film was eventually released in France on January 30, 2013 in 304 theaters, after a premiere on January 25 at the UGC Ciné-Cité Rosny outside of Paris, attended by Roschy Zem and Marie-Josée Croze. In Belgium the film was released a week later, on February 6, in 15 theaters.

== Reception ==
=== Box office performance ===
The film fizzled at the French box-office, debuting at the twelfth spot behind five of that week's other new releases (which included Lincoln, Silver Linings Playbook, and Seven Psychopaths) and making a little over 260,000 euros with an 871 euros per theater average, attracting 52,485 film goers. It fared even worse in its Belgian release where it debuted at the nineteenth spot, behind five of that week's other new releases (which included Hitchcock and Hansel and Gretel: Witch Hunters) and making a little over 26,000 euros with a 1,750 euros per theater average. As of March 3, 2013, Intersections has made a little over 300,000 euros.

=== Critical response ===
The film received an overwhelmingly negative critical response in France. Writing for Critikat, Vincent Avenel calls the script "incoherent", a sentiment echoed by Les Fiches du Cinéma's François Barge-Prieur. Avenel goes on to call the film "absurd" and "empty", all the while criticizing the abundance of product placement and finding Jaimie Alexander's beauty to be the picture's sole saving grace. In Le Monde, Jacques Mandelbaum says the film a "reality TV version" of a survival film while in Version Femina, Anne Michelet laments the lack of tension.

A rare positive review came from Staragora, which praised the film's numerous twists and flawed characters while stating the film was of the kind "one remembers for weeks after having seen it".

== Home media ==
Collision was released in France on DVD and Blu-ray in an extended version on May 30, 2013.
