= Katherine Stevens =

Katherine Stevens (or variants) may refer to:

- Katie Stevens (born 1992), American singer
- Catherine Stevens (1803–1876), English writer
- Catherine Stephens (1794–1882), English singer and actress
- Kaye Stevens (born Catherine Louise Stephens, 1932–2011), American singer and actress
- K. T. Stevens (born Gloria Wood, 1919-), American actress
