= Lydia Rose Bewley =

English actress and comedian

- Born: Lydia Rose Bewley; 9 October 1985 (age 40); Leicestershire, England
- Occupation: Actress
- Years active: 2007–present
- Children: 1
- Relatives: Charlie Bewley (brother)

Lydia Rose Bewley (born 9 October 1985) is an English actress and comedian known for her roles as Jane in The Inbetweeners Movie and The Inbetweeners 2, Metella in Plebs and Bunny in Drifters. She trained at Oxford School of Drama before working in repertory theatre.

== Early life ==
Bewley was born and raised in Leicestershire, one of four children with brothers Charlie, James and Andrew. Her mother is an opera singer and her older brother Charlie played the vampire Demetri in The Twilight Saga films. She was educated at Our Lady's Convent School in Loughborough, and Oakham School, Rutland. She graduated from the Oxford School of Drama in 2007.

== Career ==
After spending two years working as a children's entertainer, Bewley was cast as a supporting character in The Inbetweeners Movie. She appeared as "Metella" in the ITV2 sitcom Plebs from 2013 to 2014; and as "Bunny", one of the lead characters in the E4 sitcom Drifters. She was a member of the ensemble cast of I Live with Models (2015–2017).

== Personal life ==
Bewley is an Honorary Ambassador for the East Midlands Rainbows Children's Hospice. She is married and has one child.

== Filmography ==
=== Film ===
Year	Title	Role	Notes
2008	The Butcher's Shop	Venus	Short
2011	The Inbetweeners Movie	Jane	
2014	The Inbetweeners 2	Jane	
2016	Here Boy	Claudia	Short
2022	Persuasion	Mrs. Penelope Clay	
TBA	Measure	Bryony	Short film

=== Television ===
Year	Title	Role	Notes
2013–14	Plebs	Metella	14 episodes
2013–16	Drifters	Bunny	24 episodes
2015	Code of a Killer	Vicky Wilson	2 episodes
2015	Nelson in His Own Words	Emma, Lady Hamilton	BBC2 drama documentary
2015	Top Coppers	Agent Byrne	1 episode
2015–16	The Royals	Princess Penelope	10 episodes
2016	Drunk History	Various	2 episodes
2017	I Live with Models	Jess	8 episodes
2019	Spoon the Prune	Claire	
2019	Oi, Pussy	Magdalena	2 episodes
2023	Dreaming Whilst Black	Suzy	6 episodes

=== Theatre ===
Year	Title	Role	location
2007	Look Back in Anger	Helena	Lichfield Garrick Theatre
	End of the Line		
2010	The Dark and Cavernous Walls	The Doctor	The Half Moon, Herne Hill
	The Merry Wives of Windsor		
	A Midsummer Night's Dream	Titania and Helena.	
2011	The River Line		Jermyn Street Theatre
