= Margaréta Schieferová =

Slovak discus thrower (1914–2006)

Personal information
- Full name: Margaréta Schieferová
- Nationality: Slovak
- Born: 29 March 1914 Trstín, Austria-Hungary, today Slovakia
- Died: September 2006 (aged 92) Wien, Austria
- Education: Comenius University

Sport
- Country: Czechoslovakia
- Sport: Athletics
- Event: Discus throw
- Club: VŠ Bratislava

Achievements and titles
- Personal best: DT – 35.68 m (1936)
Medal record
Representing (Slovakia) Slovak krajina
Czechoslovak Athletics Championships
Gold medal – first place	1936 Prague	Discus Throw
- Updated on 27 July 2022

Margaréta Schieferová (born 29 March 1914 in Trstín, district Trnava, Austria-Hungary (today Slovakia), died September 2006 in Wien) was a Slovak athlete who competed for Czechoslovakia in the discus throw in the 1936 Olympic Games, finishing in 12th place. She was the first female athlete from Slovakia to participate in the Olympic Games.

== Biography ==
She was born in the village of Trstín, and since 1933 she has been studying law at the Faculty of Law of Comenius University. During her studies, she joined the athletics department of VŠ Bratislava. The talented and well-physically built athlete went from jumping to discus throwing, where she developed into the best Czechoslovak discus thrower in the second half of the 1930s, as she became a Czechoslovak champion and national record holder in 1936.

After the German occupation of Czechoslovakia, the athlete, who achieved the title of Doctor of Laws, devoted herself to athletics only non-competitively, until the 1943–44 season, because she married in Vienna, and lived there under the surnames Imhof and Dusby. She died in September 2006.

== International competitions ==
Year	Competition	Venue	Position	Event	Notes
Representing Czechoslovakia
1936	Olympic Games	Berlin, Germany	12th	Discus	34.03 m

== National titles ==
Czechoslovak Athletics Championships

- 1936 Prague: (gold) (Discus throw, 35.68 m PB)

== Personal bests ==
Outdoor

- Discus throw - 35.68 m NR, 1936
- Shot put - 11.10 m
- 60m - 8.2s
- Long jump - 4.92 m
