= Sister of the Groom =

- Film poster
- Directed by: Amy Miller Gross
- Written by: Amy Miller Gross
- Produced by: Amy Miller Gross; Andrew Carlberg; Tim Harms
- Starring: Alicia Silverstone; Tom Everett Scott; Jake Hoffman; Mathilde Ollivier; Charlie Bewley; Noah Silver; Abigail Marlowe; Mark Blum; Julie Engelbrecht; Ronald Guttman
- Cinematography: Charles Libin
- Edited by: Abbi Jutkowitz
- Music by: Jay Lifton
- Production companies: Mandorla Productions; Premiere Entertainment
- Distributed by: Saban Films
- Release date: December 18, 2020
- Running time: 92 minutes
- Country: United States
- Language: English

Sister of the Groom is a 2020 American comedy film, written and directed by Amy Miller Gross. It stars Alicia Silverstone, Tom Everett Scott, Jake Hoffman, Mathilde Ollivier, Charlie Bewley, Noah Silver, Abigail Marlowe, Mark Blum, Julie Engelbrecht and Ronald Guttman.

Audrey's brother is about to marry a French woman on Audrey's 40th birthday. She freaks out, trying to sabotage the wedding.

It was released on December 18, 2020 by Saban Films.

== Plot ==
Audrey (Alicia Silverstone) rides to the Hamptons with her husband Ethan for her brother Liam's wedding with Clemence, a young French woman (Mathilde Ollivier), rescheduled to take place on the same weekend she turns 40.

Minutes before they arrive, Ethan spills Audrey's coffee over her, and she is not given the chance to change for the casual chic opening Shabbat dinner. Audrey is introduced to the French family at a Shabbat dinner, where she is upset to discover Liam is going to rebuild their family's cherished holiday home and plans to employ an architect other than herself, her former fiance Isaac.

The next day, the family go water-skiing. When Audrey is towelling off, Clemence frankly asks her if she's pregnant, as a post-pregnancy hernia is causing Audrey's abdomen to protrude. Upset, Audrey drives the speed boat too fast when it's Clemence's turn, injuring Clemence's neck/shoulders.

Shortly after, Liam hurts his nose playing basketball. As Audrey is tending Liam, Clemence admonishes Liam for getting hurt just before the wedding and marches Liam off, ignoring his injury. The actual wedding ceremony requires a white dress. As the dress she'd brought with her got stained by massage oil, Audrey needs to go into town to buy a replacement dress. Before Audrey can do this, she and Ethan overhear that the bride-to-be recently aborted Liam's baby. Audrey rushes to tell Liam the news and he comes close to calling the wedding off.

When the dust clears, the wedding is still on, but Audrey is no longer welcome to participate in the main ceremony, standing near the bride and groom under the chuppah. Amidst a huge screaming match between Audrey and Clemence, Audrey's told that Isaac has been invited to the wedding.

Audrey gets a replacement white dress in town. She is at the wedding, but no longer part of the wedding party. At the reception, Isaac makes a pass at her right after Ethan storms off in a jealous huff, upset by her flirtatious behaviour and that he has just learned he is about to lose his job. She and Isaac spend some time together, and he tries to fool around with her, but she stops him, self-conscious about her stomach.

As a way of trying to connect with the bride, Audrey sprinkles ecstasy on her cake. They connect, but soon after Clemence becomes violently ill. In the ambulance, Audrey confesses she sprinkled MDMA on her cake. Audrey comes to realize she can't stand in the way of true love.

Audrey leaves the next morning early, before the Sunday brunch. She leaves an apology note to the couple, accompanying a slide show of them skinny-dipping together as husband and wife. As she gets ready to drive away, Audrey discovers Ethan had slept in the car. Audrey admits she had been drawn to Isaac as she'd wanted to feel young again, but she quickly realised she loves Ethan and their life together. The couple make up, heading home.

== Cast ==
- Alicia Silverstone as Audrey
- Tom Everett Scott as Ethan
- Jake Hoffman as Liam
- Mathilde Ollivier as Clemence
- Charlie Bewley as Isaac
- Noah Silver as Orson
- Abigail Marlowe as Suzette
- Mark Blum as Nat
- Julie Engelbrecht as Bernetta
- Ronald Guttman as Philibert
- Wai Ching Ho as Darling Aquino

== Production ==
In November 2018, it was announced Alicia Silverstone, Tom Everett Scott, Jake Hoffman, Mathilde Ollivier, Charlie Bewley, Noah Silver, Abigail Marlowe, Mark Blum, Julie Engelbrecht and Ronald Guttman had joined the cast of the film, with Amy Miller Gross directing from a screenplay she wrote, with Silverstone serving as an executive producer. The film was retitled from The Pleasure of Your Presence to Sister of the Groom for the European Film Market.

== Release ==
In May 2020, Saban Films acquired distribution rights to the film. It was scheduled to be released on December 18, 2020.

== Reception ==
The movie presently holds a 47% Rottentomatoes score and no score yet for Metacritic.
