= Catherine Stevens =

Catherine Stevens may refer to:

- Catherine Stevens (athlete), Belgian athlete
- Catherine Crowe, née Stevens, author
- Catharine O. Stevens, astronomer, sometimes written as Catherine Stevens
