= List of films about the sport of athletics =

The following is a list of films featuring the sport of athletics, including track and field.

== List ==
Year	Title	Genre	Event(s)	Notes
1927	College	Comedy		Silent film with Buster Keaton trying multiple sports.
1927	Olympic Games	Comedy		Our Gang children's version of the Olympics.
1931	Local Boy Makes Good	Comedy	Sprints	Shy librarian (Joe E. Brown) joins a college track team to impress a girl.
1932	Million Dollar Legs	Comedy	Shot put	W. C. Fields fable of team from "Klopstokia" competing at the 1932 Summer Olympics.
1937	A Million to One	Drama	Decathlon	After his dad is stripped of an Olympic gold medal, Johnny Kent trains to win one.
1954	The Bob Mathias Story	Biographical	Decathlon	A look at career of two-time Olympic gold medalist Bob Mathias.
1955	Geordie	Comedy	Hammer	Story of Scotsman out to get to the Summer Olympics.
1962	It Happened in Athens	Comedy	Marathon	Jayne Mansfield in story set at 1896 Olympics in Greece.
1962	The Loneliness of the Long Distance Runner	Drama	Distance running	Acclaimed film from UK starring Tom Courtenay.
1965	Billie	Comedy	Sprints	Patty Duke as a high school athlete who competes with boys.
1966	Walk, Don't Run	Comedy	Race walking	Final film of Cary Grant, set during the 1964 Tokyo Olympics.
1970	The Games	Drama	Marathon	Ryan O'Neal and Michael Crawford as fictional distance runners.
1973	The World's Greatest Athlete	Comedy	Track	Disney tale of a jungle boy who becomes a star athlete.
1976	The Loneliest Runner	Drama	Marathon	Made for TV, written and directed by Michael Landon.
1978	See How She Runs	Drama	Marathon	Made for TV
1979	Crossbar	Drama	High Jump	Made for TV
1979	The Jericho Mile	Drama	Mile	Made for TV about a prisoner trying to qualify for the Olympics.
1979	Our Winning Season	Drama	Mile	Story of a high school senior during time of the Vietnam War.
1979	Running	Drama	Marathon	Michael Douglas as fictional Olympic distance-running hopeful.
1979	Goldengirl	Sci-fi	Sprints	A scientifically enhanced girl (Susan Anton) trains for the 1980 Moscow Olympics.
1979	A Shining Season	Biographical	Running	True story of John Baker, a girls' track coach dying of cancer.
1981	Chariots of Fire	Drama	Sprints	True story set during 1924 Olympics. Four Academy Awards, including Best Picture.
1981	Graduation Day	Horror	Track	Slasher film about school's track athletes being murdered.
1982	Personal Best	Drama	Track	Mariel Hemingway in fictional story of women's track and field.
1983	Running Brave	Drama	10,000 m	Biographical film on the life and career of Billy Mills, starring Robby Benson.
1985	On the Edge	Drama	Trail running	A distance runner (Bruce Dern) fights for amateurs' rights during California's Dipsea Race.
1985	The Jesse Owens Story	Biographical	Sprints, long jump	True story of legendary 1930s athlete Jesse Owens, portrayed by Dorian Harewood.
1987	Cracked Up	Drama	Track	A high school athlete has a serious problem with cocaine.
1988	Run for Your Life	Drama/Thriller	Marathon	Italian-British production starring David Carradine.
1988	The Four Minute Mile	Biographical	Mile	Record-breaking run of Roger Bannister, made for television.
1991	Across the Tracks	Drama	Track	Brad Pitt and Rick Schroeder as brothers who compete in high school track and field.
1994	Forrest Gump	Comedy-drama	Running	Forrest Gump, among other things, runs repeatedly across the continental United States.
1994	Pentathlon	Thriller	Pentathlon	An East German pentathlete (Dolph Lundgren) defects to USA, where his former coach, now a neo-Nazi, finds and harasses him.
1996	Run for the Dream: The Gail Devers Story	Biographical	100m H	True story of hardships and success of great U.S. athlete Gail Devers.
1997	Prefontaine	Biographical	Running	True story of Oregon middle distance runner Steve Prefontaine, played by Jared Leto.
1998	Without Limits	Biographical	Running	Another version of life and death of Steve Prefontaine, starring Billy Crudup.
1999	Endurance	Drama	Distance running	Biographical film about Haile Gebrselassie.
2000	The Long Run	Drama	Ultramarathon	Story of the Comrades Marathon, an annual 55-mile foot race in South Africa.
2002	Pumpkin	Comedy		Christina Ricci in story about a developmentally challenged youth.
2004	Hitler's Pawn – The Margaret Lambert Story	Documentary	High Jump	True story of Gretel Bergmann, kept out of 1936 Olympics for being Jewish, replaced by an athlete who turned out to be a man. Later dramatized in Berlin 36.
2004	Miracle Run	Family	Cross country	A young autistic boy (Zac Efron) becomes interested in cross-country running.
2005	Four Minutes	Biographical	Mile	Made for TV. Chronicles the successful quest of Roger Bannister to break the four-minute barrier in the mile.
2005	The Ringer	Comedy		Johnny Knoxville bad-taste spoof of Special Olympics.
2005	Saint Ralph	Drama	Marathon	A 15-year-old boy attempts to run in the 1954 Boston Marathon.
2005	Terry	Documentary	Road running	Made for TV. Documents the Marathon of Hope, 1980 attempt of cancer patient and amputee Terry Fox to run across Canada.
2007	Run Fatboy Run	Romantic comedy	Marathon	David Schwimmer-directed comedy about an out-of-shape British man (Simon Pegg) who enters a marathon.
2007	Spirit of the Marathon	Documentary	Marathon	Follows six runners training for the 2005 Chicago Marathon
2008	Racing for Time		Track	Made for TV. Based on a true story about youths in a correctional facility.
2008	Salute	Documentary	Multiple events	Australian film looking back at 1968 Mexico City Olympics, focusing on Peter Norman, who stood alongside Tommie Smith and John Carlos in support of their protest after winning medals in the 200 metres. Directed by Norman's nephew Matt Norman.
2008	The One Man Olympics	Biographical	Track	Biographic of China's first ever Olympian Liu Changchun and his journey to compete in 1932 Summer Olympics.
2009	Berlin 36	Drama	High jump	Top athlete Gretel Bergmann is excluded from Berlin Olympics for being Jewish.
2009	Chasing a Dream	Drama	Mile run	TV film on emotionally scarred boy who attempts to run a sub-4-minute mile.
2009	The Runner		Ultra Trail	
2010	Into the Wind	Documentary	Road running	Made for TV as part of ESPN's 30 for 30 series. Another look at Terry Fox's Marathon of Hope, co-directed by NBA's Steve Nash, who followed Fox's run as a child.
2010	Marion Jones: Press Pause	Documentary	Sprints	Made for TV as part of ESPN's 30 for 30 series. On career of Marion Jones, her 2007 admission of performance-enhancing drug use, and subsequent prison sentence.
2010	The Robber	Drama	Marathon	German film about an Austrian bank-robbing runner.
2012	Paan Singh Tomar	Drama	Steeplechase	Indian film based on the true story of an athlete Paan Singh Tomar.
2012	9.79*	Documentary	100 m	Made for TV as part of ESPN's 30 for 30 series. On men's 100 metres of 1988 Olympics, where Ben Johnson set world record but was disqualified after positive test for steroids.
2012	Fast Girls	Drama	Sprints	British film about two women sprinters.
2013	Ethir Neechal	Comedy/Drama	Marathon	Indian film about a man who tries to accomplish something in life by running a marathon.
2013	Bhaag Milkha Bhaag	Drama	Running	Indian film based on true story of an athlete Milkha Singh.
2013	Runner	Documentary	Distance Running	Made for TV as part of ESPN's Nine for IX series. The stunning collision that defined the one thing missing from the otherwise brilliant career of distance runner Mary Decker
2013	Spirit of the Marathon II	Documentary	Marathon	Runners train for the 2012 Rome Marathon
2014	Unbroken	Biographical	Running	An Olympic runner becomes and survives being a World War II prisoner of war
2014	4 Minute Mile	Drama	Mile Run	A coach decides to train a student with natural athletic talent. Tragedy strikes, forcing the student to confront everything that has been holding him back.
2015	McFarland, USA	Biographical	Cross country	Kevin Costner portrays Jim White, who built the predominantly Latino McFarland High School into a California cross country power.
2016	Race	Biographical	Sprints	A new dramatization of the life of Jesse Owens, highlighted by the 1936 Summer Olympics.
2016	Tracktown	Drama	Long distance running	Training for the Olympics
2020	The Infinite Race	Documentary	Ultramarathon	Made for TV as part of ESPN's 30 for 30 series. The story of the Tarahumara, an indigenous people in Mexico famed for their long-distance running culture who inspired an worldwide ultrarunning craze, while at the same time being ravaged by the country's drug wars.
2020	The Life and Trials of Oscar Pistorius	Documentary	Sprints	Four-part film made for TV as part of ESPN's 30 for 30 series and premiering on the ESPN+ streaming service. Examines Oscar Pistorius from his childhood in the last days of apartheid, to worldwide celebrity as the first double-leg amputee to compete in the able-bodied Olympics, to convicted murderer.
2021	Zero to Hero	Biographical	Sprints	Hong Kong film based on true story of para-athlete So Wa Wai
2021	Never Stop		Sprinting	Retired sprinter Hao Chaoyue competes with his protégé Wu Tianyi in the 100-meter dash.
2021	On Your Mark	Drama	Marathon	A father and son participate in a marathon and thus come to understand and improve themselves.
2023	Listen	Documentary	Multi-event	ESPN+ film documenting the multiple failures of University of Utah officials to address concerns raised by Utes heptathlete Lauren McCluskey, culminating in her 2018 murder.

=== List of highest grossing athletics films ===
The following is a list of athletics films thar surpass $1 million. 73.7% of the films were released after 1975 and films that have not played during this period do not appear on the chart because of ticket-price inflation, population size and ticket purchasing trends not being considered.

List of highest grossing athletics films
Rank	Film	Gross	Year	Ref
1	Forrest Gump	$678,226,465	1994	
2	Unbroken	$161,459,297	2014	
3	Chariots of Fire	$59,318,980	1981	
4	McFarland	$45,710,059	2015	
5	The Ringer (2005 film)	$40,442,443	2005	
6	Run Fatboy Run	$33,478,921	2007	
7	Race	$25,070,261	2016	
8	Graduation Day	$23,894,000	1981	
9	The World's Greatest Athlete	$22,583,370	1973	
10	Personal Best	$5,672,311	1982	
11	Running Brave	$3,000,000	1983	
12	Billie	$1,500,000	1965	
13	Walk, Don't Run	$7,500,000	1966	
14	The Games	$4,895,000	1970	
15	Goldengirl	$3,000,000	1979	
16	Running	$2,800,000	1979	
17	Saint Ralph	$1,881,975	2004	
18	Fast Girls	$1,207,241	2012	
19	Our Winning Season	$1,000,000	1978	

== See also ==
- List of sports films
- List of highest grossing sports films
