= Hide Mineshima =

Japanese discus thrower

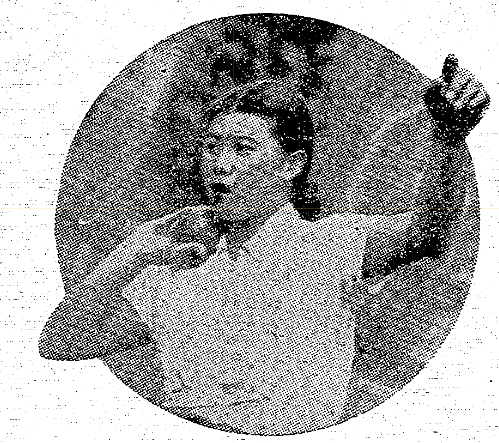

Personal information
- Nationality: Japanese
- Born: 1 February 1916

Sport
- Sport: Athletics
- Event: Discus throw

Hide Mineshima (峰島 秀, Mineshima Hide; born 1 February 1916) was a Japanese athlete. She competed in the women's discus throw at the 1936 Summer Olympics.
