= Vera Neferović =

Croatian discus thrower

Personal information
- Nationality: Croatian
- Born: 12 January 1907
- Died: 13 May 1989 (aged 82)

Sport
- Sport: Athletics
- Event: Discus throw

Vera Neferović (12 January 1907 – 13 May 1989) was a Croatian athlete. She competed in the women's discus throw at the 1936 Summer Olympics, representing Yugoslavia.
