= Margarethe Held =

Austrian discus thrower

Personal information
- Nationality: Austrian
- Born: 19 March 1911

Sport
- Sport: Athletics
- Event: Discus throw

Margarethe Held (born 19 March 1911, date of death unknown) was an Austrian athlete. She competed in the women's discus throw at the 1936 Summer Olympics.
