= Marguerite Nicolas =

French high jumper

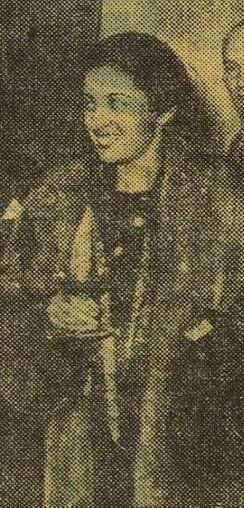

Personal information
- Nationality: French
- Born: 4 June 1916
- Died: 27 November 2001 (aged 85)

Sport
- Sport: Athletics
- Event: High jump

Marguerite Nicolas (4 June 1916 – 27 November 2001) was a French athlete. She competed in the women's high jump at the 1936 Summer Olympics.
