= Mathilde Ollivier =

French actress, producer and model (born 1994)

- Born: 20 September 1994 (age 31); Montparnasse, Paris, France
- Occupations: Model; actress; producer
- Years active: 2016–present
- Website: www.mathildeollivier.com

Mathilde Ollivier (born 20 September 1994) is a French actress, producer and model. She is known for her role in Overlord (2018).

== Early life ==
She was born and brought up in Montparnasse, Paris. She studied drama and dance at the Conservatoire de Paris and the Cours Simon before going to the Paris International Academy of Dance.

== Career ==
=== Modeling ===
Her modeling career has included appearing in the March 2016 edition of Vogue, the October 2016 edition of Purple, and the April 2017 edition of Twin.

=== Acting ===
On the French stage, Ollivier appeared in productions of Dangerous Liaisons.

She starred in J. J. Abrams's 2018 horror film Overlord, portraying Chloe, a Frenchwoman in a Nazi-occupied war-ravaged French village, into which American troops are sent with a mission on the eve of D-Day. In the 2021 film Boss Level, Ollivier was cast alongside Mel Gibson and Naomi Watts. She appeared in Sister of the Groom with Alicia Silverstone in 2020.

Ollivier produced the 2018 documentary Upright Women about the plight of women in Burkina Faso enslaved and forced into marriage.

== Filmography ==
=== Film ===
Year	Title	Role	Notes
2016	Walking Home	Her	Short film
2016	The Misfortunes of François Jane	Charlotte	
2017	La Sainte Famille	Claire	
2018	Upright Women	-	Producer; documentary
2018	Overlord	Chloe	
2019	A Call to Spy	Giselle	
2020	Sister of the Groom	Clemence	
2021	Boss Level	Gabrielle	
2024	The Wailing	Marie	

=== Television ===
Year	Title	Role	Notes
2022	1899	Clémence	Main role
2023	Mrs. Davis	Clara	
TBD	Offline	Jocelyn Higgs	Post-production
