= Ko Nakamura =

Japanese discus thrower (born 1920)

Ko Nakamura (中村 コウ, Nakamura Kō; born April 23, 1920, date of death unknown) was a Japanese discus thrower.

Nakamura competed the 1936 Summer Olympics, placing fourth.

In 1935 she became Japanese champion. Nakamura is deceased.

== Early life ==
Born in Kushiro, Hokkaido . While attending Kushiro Third Elementary School and Hokkai Girls' High School , she was selected to represent Japan at the 1936 Berlin Olympics.

In 1935, he won the Japan Championships with a jump of 35.90m, becoming number one in Japan.

On May 23 and 24, 1936, she won the final qualifying tournament for the Berlin Olympics with a throw of 37.80 m. She competed in the Olympics alongside second-place finisher Hideo Mineshima . On August 4, she placed fourth in the women's discus throw. A scene of her powerful throw appears in the documentary film Festival of the People.

Because he was still young, only 15-16 years old at the time of the Berlin Olympics, he was expected to be a gold medal candidate at the 1940 Tokyo Olympics, but due to the impact of the Sino-Japanese War , the Japanese government gave up the hosting rights, and the tournament was never held, and it ended up being a fantasy.

In January 1939, believing that the Olympics would be held, she participated in a 12-day training camp in Taiwan with Mineshima and Yamauchi Rie.
