= Majoun (album) =

Studio album by Sussan Deyhim, Richard Horowitz
- Released: 1 July 1996
- Genre: World music
- Label: Sony Classical

Majoun is a collaborative album between Sussan Deyhim and Richard Horowitz. The word Majoun means "Potion" in Persian and Arabic, and is an Egyptian delicacy, often containing hashish.

== Track listing ==
All tracks are written by Sussan Deyhim / Richard Horowitz.

No.	Title	Length
1.	"Majoun"	5.52
2.	"Kye Kye (Who Is Who Is)"	8:36
3.	"Agonethi (Shadow Maps)"	7:20
4.	"Whorlon on the Mount of Moon"	10:32
5.	"Coldest Day"	5:04
6.	"Ipissima Verba"	7:24
7.	"Murmur Mutanta"	7:52
8.	"Botachine (Infinitely Curved)"	9:32
Total length:		28:42

== Personnel ==
Credits adapted from liner notes.

Musicians

- Sussan Deyhim – voice
- Richard Horowitz – keyboards
- Byron Wallen - trumpet
- Doug Wimbish - fretless bass
- Peter Freeman – overtone bass
- Steve Shehan - percussion, djembe
- Others

Technical personnel

- Sussan Deyhim – production
- Richard Horowitz – production
- Grace Row – executive production
- Anders Kalmark – programming
- Ray Staff - mastering
- Kerstin Bach – art direction
- Joseph Cultice – photography
