= Junko Nishida =

Japanese high jumper (1915–1942)

Personal information
- Nationality: Japanese
- Born: 3 November 1915
- Died: 30 September 1942 (aged 27)

Sport
- Sport: Athletics
- Event: High jump

Junko Nishida (西田 順子, Nishida Junko; 3 November 1915 – 30 September 1942)) was a Japanese athlete. She competed in the women's high jump at the 1936 Summer Olympics. She died on 30 September 1942, at the age of 27.
