= Berlin 36 =

2009 film set in the Olympic games in fascist Germany directed by Kaspar Heidelbach

- Directed by: Kaspar Heidelbach
- Written by: Lothar Kurzawa
- Starring: Karoline Herfurth; Sebastian Urzendowsky; Axel Prahl
- Music by: Arno Steffen
- Distributed by: X Verleih AG (though Warner Bros.)
- Release date: 10 September 2009
- Running time: 100 minutes
- Country: Germany
- Language: German

Berlin 36 is a 2009 German film telling the fate of Jewish track and field athlete Gretel Bergmann in the 1936 Summer Olympics. In the movie she was replaced by the Nazi regime with a fellow athlete which she befriended. The film, based on a true story, was released in Germany on 10 September 2009.

Reporters at Der Spiegel challenged the historical basis for many of the events in the film, pointing to arrest records and medical examinations indicating German authorities did not determine Dora Ratjen as being male until 1938.

== Plot ==
The athlete Gretel Bergmann wins the high jump championships in the United Kingdom. Since the Nazi racial laws prevented her continuing her training in Germany, being a Jew, her father had sent her to England, where she could live more safely and continue her sporting career.

At the Berlin Olympics in 1936, the Americans and the IOC (International Olympic Committee) demand that Jewish athletes are not to be excluded from the event, especially the high jumper Gretel Bergmann of international fame, thus putting the Nazi Olympic Committee in great difficulty. A victory by a Jewish athlete would seriously humiliate the Nazi party. When her family in Germany is threatened, Gretel returns to Germany. She is included in the German Olympic high jump team, seemingly with the same rights as the other athletes in the training camp.

Hans Waldmann, the coach of the team, is enthusiastic about the skills and discipline of Gretel and adopts a policy of impartiality based solely on sportsmanship. However, Waldmann is dismissed by Nazi party officials and replaced as coach by Sigfrid Kulmbach, loyal to the party. Kulmbach attempts, instead, by every means to discourage the young athlete and undermine her self-esteem.

Her roommate and sole competitor in talent is Marie Ketteler. Marie, however, is really a man, by whom the Nazis want to attain the gold medal in high jump. Between Marie and Gretel, despite numerous threats from outside, a friendship forms.

Despite being the most promising athlete in high jump training, Gretel is suddenly excluded from competition under false pretences, only a few days before the Games. She is replaced by Marie, the second best athlete.

Marie, however, behaves in strange ways: she never takes a bath with her companions, shaves her legs several times a day and has a deep voice. Gretel, therefore, discovers her true identity. Meanwhile, Marie discovers that Gretel was excluded from the race under false pretenses. So Marie decides to deliberately lose the final and decisive leap. The dislodged bar spells the shattering of hope of victory in the German officials, who are dumbstruck. Marie gains only the fourth place. Marie and Gretel, the latter observing the contest as a spectator, exchange a secret happy smile, for their common opposition led to the defeat of the cruel Nazi ambitions and ideals.

== Cast ==
- Karoline Herfurth as Gretel Bergmann
- Sebastian Urzendowsky as Marie Ketteler
- Axel Prahl as Hans Waldmann
- August Zirner as Edwin Bergmann
- Maria Happel as Paula Bergmann
- Franz Dinda as Rudolph Bergmann
- Leon Seidel as Walter Bergmann
- Thomas Thieme as Hans von Tschammer und Osten
- Johann von Bülow as Karl Ritter von Halt
- Julie Engelbrecht as Elisabeth 'Lilly' Vogt
- Klara Manzel as Thea Walden
- Robert Gallinowski as Sigfrid Kulmbach
- Elena Uhlig as Frau Vogel
- Otto Tausig as Leo Löwenstein
- John Keogh as Avery Brundage

== Premiere ==
Berlin 36 premiered on 22 August 2009 in the German capital, Berlin. The film received generally positive reviews from critics. The film has been called "interesting" by the German magazine Der Spiegel and placed in the category "Play" by the German weekly Die Zeit.

In January 2010, the film was presented at the Palm Springs International Film Festival. On the same date, the film was presented at the Atlanta Jewish Film Festival and the New York Jewish Film Festival, a film festival that deals with Jewish history.

During the presentation of the movie at the Atlanta Jewish Film Festival, the consular officer Lutz Görgens compared the theme of the movie to Jeremy Schaap's book Triumph, which tells the story of the American athlete Jesse Owens, who won the gold medal at the 1936 Olympic Games, despite the strong discrimination he suffered. Görgens said that "the book and the movie teaches us about the bad politics of sport. They remind us of the preciousness of political freedom, the excellence of athletic futility, and the true value of friendship".

In fact, unlike the film, Gretel Bergmann, as a young woman, did not know her partner was later determined to be a man, but she learned it only in 1966, reading an article in Time. Bergmann told the magazine Der Spiegel, at the age of 95 years, "I never suspected anything. We all wondered why she never got naked in the shower. Being so shy at seventeen, it seemed absurd, but we thought, well, it is bizarre and weird".

== See also ==
- List of films about the sport of athletics
