= The Last Witch Hunter =

2015 American film by Breck Eisner

- Theatrical release poster
- Directed by: Breck Eisner
- Written by: Cory Goodman; Matt Sazama Burk Sharpless
- Based on: "Melkor the Witch-Hunter" by Vin Diesel
- Produced by: Mark Canton; Vin Diesel; Bernie Goldmann
- Starring: Vin Diesel; Elijah Wood; Rose Leslie; Julie Engelbrecht; Michael Caine
- Cinematography: Dean Semler
- Edited by: Dean Zimmerman; Chris Lebenzon
- Music by: Steve Jablonsky
- Production companies: Mark Canton Productions; One Race Films; Goldmann Pictures
- Distributed by: Summit Entertainment (through Lionsgate)
- Release dates: October 13, 2015 (AMC Loews Lincoln Square); October 23, 2015 (United States)
- Running time: 106 minutes
- Country: United States
- Language: English
- Budget: $71–90 million
- Box office: $146.9 million

The Last Witch Hunter is a 2015 American fantasy action film directed by Breck Eisner and written by Cory Goodman, Matt Sazama and Burk Sharpless, based on the Dungeons & Dragons campaigns of Vin Diesel as "Melkor the Witch-Hunter". The film stars Diesel as an immortal witch-hunter who must stop a plague from ravaging the entire world.

The Last Witch Hunter premiered at the AMC Loews Lincoln Square in New York City on October 13, 2015, and was released in the United States on October 23, by Summit Entertainment, being the last film distributed by the company before it was absorbed into Lionsgate. The film received generally negative reviews from critics, but grossed $146.9 million worldwide. A sequel is in development.

== Plot ==
Eight hundred years ago, the Witch Queen unleashes the Black Plague to wipe out humanity. A band of knights, including a widowed Kaulder, storms her lair and impales her. Before dying, the Queen curses Kaulder with eternal life.

In the present day, Kaulder prevents a teenager from unintentionally destroying an airplane with weather-controlling runes. Kaulder is revealed to be a witch hunter for an organization called the Axe and Cross, which aims to keep the truce between humans and witches and either executes or imprisons witches who break the law. He is aided by a priest called "Dolan", a tradition carried from the battle to destroy the Queen.

The 36th Dolan tells Kaulder he is retiring from his duties and has chosen a new Dolan, but dies in his sleep. Kaulder and the young 37th Dolan, who says witches killed his parents and that Kaulder killed the witches and saved him from a fire which burned 37's hands, deduce that 36 was murdered by a witch. While tracking down the witch, Kaulder finds traces of old dark magic, not seen since before he killed the Queen. It is revealed that 36 is not dead but under a dark magic spell that can only be broken if the witch that cast it is killed.

Using clues that 36 left behind, Kaulder goes to a witch bar, owned by Chloe and Miranda, to buy a memory spell to help him remember how he died and came back. Chloe eventually agrees to perform the spell. During the process of reliving Kaulder's memory, the bar is attacked by the warlock who cursed the 36th Dolan.

The warlock later attacks Chloe at her apartment, though Kaulder saves her. 37 and Kaulder work together to determine the witch's name—Baltasar Ketola, aka Belial. After Belial kills Miranda, Chloe agrees to help Kaulder get what he needs to kill him.

To get the rare ingredient to create another memory spell, they visit another witch, Danique. However, she casts a memory spell on Kaulder, planning to entrap him in his dream forever. Chloe, however, is able to enter his trance and free his mind and the pair escape.

Kaulder asks Chloe to enter his mind and pull out the memory. He discovers that, though the Queen's body burned to ash, the first Dolan chose to spare her heart; if the heart was destroyed, Kaulder would die. They deduce that 36 was attacked because he knew where the heart was hidden and was tortured into revealing its location. They also realize that Belial's real plan is to revive the Queen.

Leaving Chloe and the 37th Dolan behind, Kaulder goes to face Belial to prevent the Queen from returning. Though he kills Belial in a confrontation, the Queen reenters the world through the sacrifice of another witch (Max Schlesinger) and escapes into the city, stealing Kaulder's immortality. 36, who is recovering, encourages Kaulder to continue fighting.

The members of the Witch Council, who guard the Witches' Prison, are killed and the Queen plans to release another plague curse using the imprisoned witches as a magical power source. Using her dream-walking ability, Chloe kills a prisoner, severing the connection with the Queen. Kaulder fights the Queen, and appears close to killing her, until 37 attacks him with a grudge: he reveals his parents were a warlock and witch whom Kaulder killed, though 37 lacks their magical power.

37 asks the Queen to give him that power, but she refuses and kills him, then uses Chloe to complete the connection for the plague curse to form again. Kaulder summons lightning to his sword using the weather runes he confiscated from the teenager on the plane, and throws his sword into the Queen, burning her to ash. Kaulder prepares to kill both himself and the Queen's heart, but Chloe dissuades him, stating that there are things in the darkness worse than the Witch Queen that he needs to continue fighting.

The 36th Dolan agrees to delay his retirement and stay by Kaulder's side. Chloe does as well, and the three form a new team, free from the Axe and Cross. The heartbeat of the Queen is heard within Kaulder's weapon vault in his apartment.

== Cast ==
- Vin Diesel as Kaulder
- Rose Leslie as Chloe
- Elijah Wood as Dolan 37th
- Michael Caine as Dolan 36th
- Ólafur Darri Ólafsson as Baltasar Ketola/Belial
- Julie Engelbrecht as Witch Queen
- Rena Owen as Glaeser
- Isaach De Bankolé as Max Schlesinger
- Lotte Verbeek as Helena, Kaulder's Wife
- Dawn Olivieri as Danique
- Inbar Lavi as Sonya
- Aimee Carrero as Miranda
- Bex Taylor-Klaus as Bronwyn
- Allegra Carpenter as Fatima
- Kurt Angle as Bodyguard #4
- Joe Gilgun as Ellic
- Sloane Coombs as Elizabeth

== Production ==
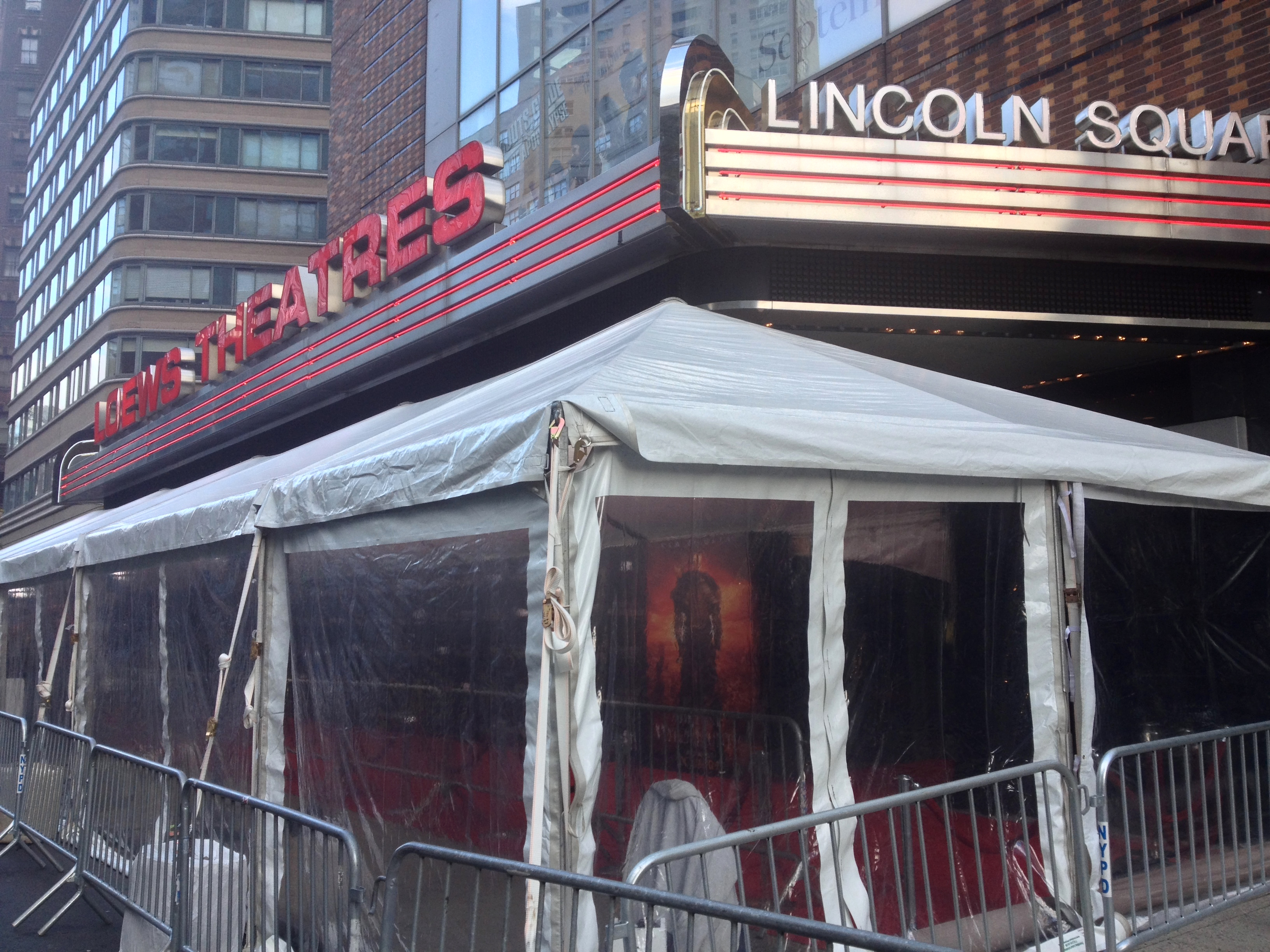
The film's New York premiere was held at the Loews Lincoln Square on October 13, 2015.

In September 2015, Vin Diesel revealed that The Last Witch Hunter would be a film adaptation of Diesel's own Dungeons & Dragons campaigns as "Melkor the Witch-Hunter", an original character of his, having been put in touch with screenwriter (and fellow Dungeons & Dragons player) Cory Goodman to do so after Diesel had mentioned these campaigns in the foreword for the 30th anniversary collection of Dungeons & Dragons. Initially Timur Bekmambetov was to direct but was later replaced by Breck Eisner and Goodman's script was re-written by D.W. Harper before Melisa Wallack was brought on to work on the film's script. Both were uncredited. The production filed for a film tax credit in Pennsylvania and was allocated a tax credit of $14 million. In February 2014, Vin Diesel posted a photo of the film's concept artwork to his Facebook page and Lionsgate CEO Jon Feitheimer commented that if successful, The Last Witch Hunter could become a film franchise. In March 2014, Lakeshore Entertainment boarded the film as co-financier with Lionsgate, but Lakeshore quietly left the project. In July 2014, it was announced that Rose Leslie would be joining the cast as Vin Diesel's co-star, and in August, Elijah Wood, Michael Caine, and Ólafur Darri Ólafsson were also announced as attached to the film. Julie Engelbrecht and Lotte Verbeek will also star. In February 2015, Steve Jablonsky was hired to compose the film's score.

Principal photography for The Last Witch Hunter was initially delayed due to the death of Paul Walker, as the death delayed shooting for Furious 7. Lionsgate officially began setting up for filming in Pittsburgh in June 2014. The filming began on September 5, 2014, in Pittsburgh, as Diesel posted a first look of himself on Facebook. The shoot lasted until December 5.

== Music ==
R&B singer Ciara covered "Paint It Black" by English rock band the Rolling Stones for the film.

On 13 November 2015, The Last Witch Hunter Soundtrack, with music composed by Steve Jablonsky was released.

No.	Title	Length
1.	"I Curse You With Life"	8:11
2.	"Three Is Trouble"	3:21
3.	"Judgement"	3:12
4.	"Well Hello, Witch Hunter"	4:23
5.	"Lights Out"	1:06
6.	"The Witch Queen"	4:06
7.	"I Must Remember"	3:31
8.	"Good Hunting"	6:36
9.	"Remember Your Death"	4:45
10.	"This Isn't Real"	3:50
11.	"I Am Reborn"	4:19
12.	"You Have To Fight"	3:01
13.	"By Iron And Fire"	11:26
14.	"At Your Service"	3:10

== Release ==
The film's New York City premiere was held October 13, 2015 at the Loews Lincoln Square.

== Reception ==
=== Box office ===
The Last Witch Hunter grossed $27.4 million in North America and $113 million in other territories for a worldwide total of $140.4 million, against a budget of $90 million.

The film opened on October 23, 2015 alongside Paranormal Activity: The Ghost Dimension, Rock the Kasbah and Jem and the Holograms, as well as the expanded release of Steve Jobs. In its opening weekend, the film was projected to gross $13 million from 3,082 theaters; it made $525,000 from its Thursday night previews and $3.7 million on its first day. In its opening weekend, the film grossed $10.8 million, finishing fourth at the box office behind The Martian ($15.7 million), Goosebumps ($15.3 million) and Bridge of Spies ($11.3 million).

Outside North America, the film's top openings were in Russia and the CIS ($3.4 million), Brazil ($2 million) and Italy ($1.2 million).

=== Critical response ===
On Rotten Tomatoes, the film has a rating of 17%, based on 138 reviews, with an average rating of 3.9/10. The site's critical consensus reads, "Grim, plodding, and an overall ill fit for Vin Diesel's particular charms, The Last Witch Hunter will bore and/or confuse all but the least demanding action-fantasy fans." On Metacritic, the film has a score of 34 out of 100, based on 22 critics, indicating "generally unfavorable reviews". Audiences polled by CinemaScore gave the film an average grade of "B−" on an A+ to F scale.

Alison Willmore from BuzzFeed News said "It is terrible. It is fabulously entertaining." Inkoo Kang of TheWrap thought it aimed for pulp but wasn't "as fleet, funny, or detailed as it needs to be". Simon Abrams for RogerEbert.com called it "atypically dopey but consummately well-assembled", and praised Diesel as "especially charming".

== Future ==
On June 17, 2015, Diesel stated on his Facebook page that an untitled sequel was in the planning stages. Though it was initially planned to be a franchise, the poor box office showing as well as Diesel's busy film schedule has cast doubts on a sequel getting made.

On March 10, 2020, Diesel stated that Lionsgate is going through with a sequel.

On September 8, 2025, Michael Caine was reported to be coming out of retirement to reprise his role in the sequel, which is now being fast-tracked.

== See also ==
- List of films about witchcraft
