= Hammer of the Gods (2013 film) =

- Theatrical poster
- Directed by: Farren Blackburn
- Written by: Matthew Read
- Produced by: Rupert Preston; Huberta Von Liel
- Starring: Charlie Bewley; Clive Standen; James Cosmo
- Cinematography: Stephan Pehrsson
- Edited by: Sam Williams
- Music by: Benjamin Wallfisch
- Production company: Vertigo Films
- Distributed by: Magnet Releasing
- Release date: 5 July 2013
- Running time: 103 minutes
- Country: United Kingdom
- Language: English
- Box office: $641 (US)

Hammer of the Gods is a 2013 British action film directed by Farren Blackburn and released on 5 July 2013. In it, a dying Viking king sends his son on a quest to seek out his older brother, the clan's only hope of defeating an approaching enemy horde.

== Plot ==
Britain 871 AD. After the Battle of Ashdown Young Norse prince Steinar arrives in England with a complement of 500 reserve warriors to combat a Saxon uprising that is crushing the occupying forces led by his father, King Bagsecg. Arriving at his father's camp, Steiner attends a family meeting with his father, his older brother Harold, and their younger half brother Vali, who is disliked by everyone but Steinar for being half Saxon. Absent is their older brother, Hakan, who has not been seen for over a decade due to a bitter animosity between him and their father, the cause unknown to Steinar.

Bagsecg, who is bedridden and dying, dreads leaving the throne to Harold (now next in line due to Hakan's absence) whose insistence that diplomacy, rather than being their best option, would instead put their clan under English rule. He orders Steinar to kill Vali for cowardice, to test his strength as a leader.

Steinar refuses and warns Harold off, who attempts it himself to gain favour with their father. Furious, Bagsecg dismisses Harold and Vali and charges Steinar with a near impossible task. Despite still harbouring contempt for his eldest son, Bagsecg orders Steinar to venture deep into the hostile English lands to find Hakan and bring him back so he may assume the throne.

Steinar departs with his closest comrades: his close friend Hagen, a Berserker named Grim, and Jokul, a superstitious believer in omens. Later they are joined by Vali who warns he has witnessed Harold secretly meeting with the Saxon King. Despite the urgency to return, Steinar pushes forward. later they encountered a woman who is being tied to a rock and stoned by couple saxon men they demand them to release her they refuse and it resulted in a fierce battle won by steinar and his friend when Grim release her she tried to stab one of the men who stoned her only to accidentally slice grim's cheek enrage he killed her

They approach Ivar the Boneless, a Viking recluse and sodomite who lives with a slave girl named Agnes and a mute catamite. He agrees to lead them to where he believes Hakan to be and departs with Agnes while abandoning the latter.

The group however are pursued by hooded men who slay Grim and later capture them all. Revealed to be soldiers of the Christian faith, their captain confirms that Harold has been secretly negotiating a surrender, on condition he remains in power over his people. But the captain proposes to Steinar that he would be best suited to rule his clan, if he would agree to submit to Christianity. Steinar refuses, knowing the stranglehold Christians would have on his people. Vali, however, switches sides to save his own neck and is taken to a nearby church, while Ivar is castrated for biting off the ear of a soldier.

Agnes (who had evaded capture) frees Steinar, who then frees Hagen and Jokul. Ivar dies from blood loss but tells Steinar where he may find Hakan. They rescue Vali, but Hagen and Jokul demand he be killed for his cowardice and treachery, forcing Steinar to kill Hagen by duel to protect his brother.

Now down to four, they head into an eerie forest and are captured again, this time by a tribe who dwell deep within a nearby cave. Taken there, Jokul is killed and later served up as the tribe's banquet, Vali again switches sides, while Agnes is claimed by the tribal chief, Steinar's older brother Hakan, who the tribe worship as a god.

During the tribal festivities, Steinar encounters his mother Astrid, whom he believed dead, and who is also deluded by Hakan's megalomania. Further shocking revelations are made as Steinar finally learns the truth behind Hakan's exile. To his disgust, his mother and brother openly share a passionate kiss, revealing their incestuous relationship.

After Hakan kills Vali to further his dominance over the tribe, he and Steinar are lowered into a dark pit to fight to the death. Despite Astrid secretly handing Hakan a knife to win, Steinar emerges the victor. The tribe bow in submission while Astrid, in an attempt to kill Steinar, is thrown into the pit by him.

Steinar later returns to Bagsecg's camp with Agnes, and presents Hakan's head to his father. Harold argues he was supposed to bring Hakan back alive. But Bagsecg responds "He was sent to find a king" seeing that Steinar is now ready to lead their people and gives him full command of the Nordic Army.

Steinar then kills Harold for his treachery and weakness, much to Bagsecg's applause who can now rest easy knowing the kingdom is in good hands. Later, with Agnes by his side who is now his wife and queen, he musters his army to confront the approaching Saxon forces which he orders to charge with him leading it.

== Cast ==
- Charlie Bewley as Prince Steinar
- Clive Standen as Hagen
- Michael Jibson as Grim
- James Cosmo as King Bagsecg
- Elliot Cowan as Hakan
- Guy Flanagan as Jokul
- Glynis Barber as Astrid
- Ivan Kaye as Ivar
- Alexandra Dowling as Agnes
- Finlay Robertson as Prince Harold
- Francis Magee as Ulric The Chronicler
- Salomon Thomson as Wilfred
- Michael Lindall as Saxon Leader
- Laura Sibbick as Saxon Woman
- Theo Barklem-Biggs as Prince Vali

== Reception ==
On review aggregator Rotten Tomatoes, Hammer of the Gods holds an approval rating of 29%, based on 21 reviews, and an average rating of 3.98/10. On Metacritic, the film has a weighted average score of 44 out of 100, based on 5 critics, indicating "mixed or average reviews".

Tom Huddleston of Time Out London rated it 3/5 stars and wrote "It's hardly high art, but for a cheapjack homegrown action flick this is surprisingly solid." Philip French of The Observer called it "a nasty, brutal and relatively short entertainment, aimed at middle-of-the-woad Conanists." Peter Beech of The Guardian rated it 3/5 stars and wrote "A sense of humour and some pyrotechnically gory skirmishes enliven this tale of a Viking in hostile Saxon terrain". Matt Glasby of Total Film rated it 2/5 stars and wrote "Gamely directed and acted, but a little threadbare in terms of plot and design, it’s suitably savage but not quite fun enough to forgive the flaws." Dean Essner of Slant Magazine rated it 0.5/5 stars and called it "an unbearably stupid exercise in gore that deserves to die the same cruel, soulless death that nearly every character does at some point".
