= Bachelor Games =

2016 English film

- Directed by: Edward McGown
- Written by: Sam Michell, Chris Hill
- Produced by: Georgina Edwards
- Starring: Charlie Bewley; Jack Gordon; Jack Doolan; Mike Noble; Obi Abili
- Cinematography: Lucio Bonelli
- Edited by: Kate Coggins
- Music by: David Julyan
- Production companies: Strike Films; Lex Filmed Entertainment
- Release date: 8 July 2016
- Countries: United Kingdom; Argentina
- Language: English

Bachelor Games (originally titled Rules of the Game) is a 2016 English-language horror comedy film directed by British director Edward McGown and produced by Strike Films' Georgina Edwards. The film was shot on location in the foothills of the Andes in Cafayate in north west Argentina. It stars Charlie Bewley, Jack Gordon, Jack Doolan, Mike Noble and Obi Abili. The film won Best Feature at Halloweenapalooza 2016.

== Plot ==
Henry (Gordon) is getting married and heads to Argentina with his best mates for an epic bachelor party trip. Henry and his best man, Leon (Bewley), and close friends Roy (Noble) and Terence (Doolan) arrive at a remote village in the foothills of the Andes and are surprised to find Henry's friend Max (Abili) is already there. Amongst the drunken antics of the five boys something is wrong - Max seems unhinged and there are warnings from the locals about a mysterious figure known as 'The Hunter'. The next morning they head out on a trek into the mountains that nobody really wants to go on. Tempers fray, old arguments reemerge and soon Terence storms off. The group soon find a bloody shirt but it is unclear what has happened. But not everything is as it seems and soon an elaborate scheme for revenge goes horribly awry.

== Cast ==
- Charlie Bewley as Leon
- Jack Gordon as Henry
- Jack Doolan as Terence
- Mike Noble as Roy
- Obi Abili as Max

== Crew ==
Bachelor Games is director Edward McGown's feature debut. McGown is a graduate of the MPA film program at Columbia University in New York, where he was awarded the FMI Fellowship for directing. His short Out There won the National Board of Review of Motion Pictures Student Award and his other shorts have played at various festivals including Cannes, Edinburgh and Palm Springs. He also directed episodes of Hollyoaks and Sugar Rush. The film is scored by Christopher Nolan's former collaborator David Julyan (Memento, Insomnia and The Prestige).

== Development ==
Bachelor Games is based on a Strike's 2009 short The Rules of the Game starring Christopher Harper which played at Cannes Short Film Corner.

== Awards ==
Won Best Feature winner at Halloweenapalooza Film Festival and was an official selection at World Horror Con Film Festival and Green Bay Film Festival.

== Release ==
Gravitias Ventures released the film on digital platforms on 8 July 2016.

== Reception ==
The film was described as "The Hangover meets The Hills Have Eyes with a Shyamalan-esque twist" by Back to the Movies and "a good thriller that had a supernatural edge to it" by Forbidden Planet.
