= Anna Hagemann =

German discus thrower

Personal information
- Nationality: German
- Born: 26 February 1919
- Died: 2 October 2008 (aged 89)

Sport
- Sport: Athletics
- Event: Discus throw

Anna Hagemann (26 February 1919 – 2 October 2008) was a German athlete. She competed in the women's discus throw at the 1936 Summer Olympics.
