= Moussa Maaskri =

French actor

- Born: 15 November 1962 (age 63); Constantine, Algeria
- Occupation: Actor
- Years active: 1990–present

Moussa Maaskri (Arabic: موسى معسكري) (born 15 November 1962) is an Algerian-born French actor. He has appeared in more than 70 films since 1990.

== Selected filmography ==
Year	Title	Role	Notes
1995	Bye-Bye		
2001	Vidocq		
2004	Two Brothers		
2008	The Last Deadly Mission	Ringwald	
2008	Anything for Her		
2008	Crossfire		
2009	District 13: Ultimatum	L'homme de main de Roland	
2010	Point Blank	Officer Vogel	
2010	22 Bullets	Karim	
2010	Turk's Head	Irfan	
2013	Collision		
2013	Vive la France		
2014	El Niño		
2014	The Connection		
2015	The Boss's Daughter	Azoug	
2016	Overdrive	Panahi	
2017	L'ascension	Nassir	
2018	Brillantissime	The seller	
2021	Stillwater	Dirosa	
