= Charlie Bewley =

English actor and producer (born 1981)

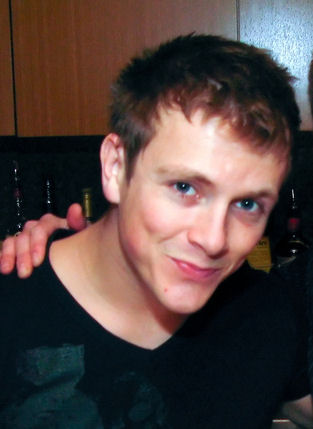
- Bewley in 2009
- Born: Charles Martin Bewley; 25 January 1981 (age 45)
- Occupations: Actor, producer
- Years active: 2009–present
- Relatives: Lydia Rose Bewley (sister)

Charles Martin Bewley (born 25 January 1981) is an English actor and producer best known for his role as the vampire Demetri in The Twilight Saga films, Galen Vaughn on The Vampire Diaries (2013), and Charles Wentworth on Nashville (2013–2014).

== Personal life ==
Bewley grew up on a farm in Leicestershire. He is the eldest of four children, having a sister Lydia and brothers James and Andrew. He attended Loughborough Grammar School in Leicestershire and Oakham School in Rutland. Bewley spent some time living in Vancouver. He now resides in Los Angeles.

== Career ==
Since Twilight, Bewley has starred in Hammer of the Gods and guest-starred on The Vampire Diaries. His most recent project is a Kickstarter campaign for a film called Thunder Road, he is working with partners Matt Dallas and Steven Grayhm. He also stars as Leon in the 2014 British adventure movie Rules of the Game.

== Filmography ==
=== Film ===
Year	Title	Role	Notes
2009	The Twilight Saga: New Moon	Demetri	
2010	The Twilight Saga: Eclipse	Demetri	
2011	Like Crazy	Simon	
2011	Ecstasy	David Lancer	
2011	The Twilight Saga: Breaking Dawn – Part 1	Demetri	
2012	The Outback	Loki (voice)	
2012	Wyatt Earp's Revenge	Sam Bass	Video
2012	Soldiers of Fortune	Charles Herbert Vanderbeer	
2012	The Twilight Saga: Breaking Dawn – Part 2	Demetri	
2012	Slightly Single in L.A.	Hayden	
2013	Intersection	Travis	
2013	Hammer of the Gods	Steinar	
2014	Rules of the Game	Leon	
2017	Renegades	Stanton Baker	
2017	The Broken Ones	Jim Murphy	
2020	Sister of the Groom	Isaac	
2022	A Dangerous Affair	Pierce Dalton	

=== Television ===
Year	Title	Role	Notes
2013	The Vampire Diaries	Galen Vaughn	5 episodes; season 4
2013–2014	Nashville	Charles Wentworth	Recurring role (season 2)
2014	Extant	Odin James / Gavin Hutchinson	Recurring role
2016–2017	Colony	Simon Eckhart	Recurring role

=== Music video ===
Year	Artist	Title	Notes
2015	Mandy Allyn	"Say It First"	love interest
