= Boss Level =

2020 science fiction action film by Joe Carnahan

- Official release poster
- Directed by: Joe Carnahan
- Screenplay by: Chris Borey; Eddie Borey; Joe Carnahan
- Story by: Chris Borey; Eddie Borey
- Produced by: Joe Carnahan; Frank Grillo; Randall Emmett; George Furla
- Starring: Frank Grillo; Mel Gibson; Naomi Watts; Annabelle Wallis; Michelle Yeoh
- Cinematography: Juan Miguel Azpiroz
- Edited by: Kevin Hale
- Music by: Clinton Shorter
- Production companies: Highland Film Group; Emmett/Furla Oasis; Diamond Film Productions; MoviePass Films; The Fyzz Facility; Ingenious Media; WarParty Films
- Distributed by: Hulu (United States) VVS Films (Canada)
- Release dates: February 11, 2020 (Los Angeles); February 25, 2021 (Australia); March 5, 2021 (United States)
- Running time: 100 minutes
- Country: United States
- Language: English
- Budget: $45 million
- Box office: $2 million

Boss Level is a 2020 American science fiction action film directed by Joe Carnahan and written by Carnahan, Chris Borey, and Eddie Borey, from a story by the Boreys. It stars Frank Grillo as a retired special forces soldier who tries to escape a never-ending time loop that results in his death. Mel Gibson, Annabelle Wallis, Naomi Watts, and Michelle Yeoh co-star.

Originally announced in 2012 as Continue, it was developed by Carnahan at 20th Century Fox but did not move forward and sat in development hell. It was resuscitated in November 2017, with Carnahan, Grillo, Lorenzo di Bonaventura, and Mark Vahradian producing, and Randall Emmett and George Furla producing and financing. Filming took place in Georgia from March to May 2018.

It was acquired for theatrical release by Entertainment Studios Motion Pictures on August 16, 2018, but dropped by the distributor.

The film was eventually released in the United States on March 5, 2021 direct to streaming on Hulu.

== Plot ==
Roy Pulver, a retired Delta Force soldier in Atlanta, has been stuck in a time loop for nearly 140 days and has learned the day's patterns through many previous loops. He wakes at 07:00 AM each day, avoids an assassin in his apartment and an attack by a gunman in a helicopter outside his window, then escapes his apartment before it explodes. He has been able to elude more assassins throughout the morning, but finds himself unable to figure out how to survive a final attack at 12:47 PM, waking up back in his apartment on the next loop.

On the day before Roy entered the loop, his estranged wife Jemma had asked Roy to visit her at defense contractor Dynow Labs under the pretense of a job interview. The two argue over Joe, their son, whom Jemma has led to believe that Roy is just a family friend. When Colonel Clive Ventor, head of Dynow, discovers Roy near Jemma's highly classified project, he has him escorted out, but not before Jemma obtains a sample of Roy's hair.

In one loop, Roy tries to call Jemma but instead reaches Ventor, who tells him that Jemma died from a lab accident the day before. Roy becomes suspicious. On a later loop, he finds Joe at Underground Atlanta, skipping school for a video game tournament. Roy spends the day with Joe but does not mention Jemma's death. The assassins arrive to kill Roy, but not before 12:50 PM, the longest he has lived in the loop so far. Roy uses his body to protect Joe, telling him as he dies that he is his father.

When Roy next wakes, he realizes due to the previous night that the assassins had followed him using a dental tracking device implanted by Alice, his date from the night before, who is a dental hygienist. Through more trial-and-error loops, Roy finds a way to remove the tracker and sneak into Dynow, killing several guards and assassins, but is always stopped by Ventor and the sword wielding Guan Yin. Ventor reveals to Roy that Jemma's project is the Osiris Spindle, a quantum device capable of rewriting history, which Ventor plans to use to set himself up as the world's dictator. Ventor admits he was responsible for Jemma's death after an argument the night before. As she had started the Spindle and no one else knows how to operate it, Ventor warns Roy the Spindle will destroy the world if it runs too long.

On further loops, Roy makes the connection to the Egyptian god of the afterlife, Osiris, from a book with a hidden message that Jemma gifted him for his birthday, and he realizes that Jemma must have placed him in the Spindle to stop Ventor. While he is able to further infiltrate Dynow and kill Ventor after learning sword fighting from "daily" lessons from Dai Feng, Roy learns the assassins were sent to kill Joe, and arrives too late. As he mourns over Joe, the Osiris Spindle explodes and destroys the world.

Roy spends several loops in a despondent state, then decides to spend several more loops with Joe, staying with him until the Spindle's explosion. In one loop, he learns that Jemma had called Joe that morning, later than he previously thought she was still alive, and realizes he can save her. After determining the exact time and place she died at Ventor's hands in Dynow, fourteen minutes after he wakes up, Roy uses the next loop to hijack the helicopter, get to Dynow, kill the waiting assassins, and stop Ventor before he kills Jemma.

Roy tells Jemma he has been spending his loops with Joe, and that he has seen the end of the world. Jemma tells Roy that he has to enter the Osiris Spindle in order to reset it, and that either he would wake up and repeat the day one more time or he would die permanently. Roy kisses Jemma, before preparing to enter the Spindle.

The ending of the film is split into two versions: In the first ending, Roy enters the Spindle as Jemma looks on in awe. In the second ending, Roy faces the start of the loop one last time, with his narration saying, "Piece o' cake," as his attacker appears, leaving his fate to the viewer.

== Cast ==
- Frank Grillo as Roy Pulver
- Mel Gibson as Colonel Clive Ventor
- Naomi Watts as Jemma Wells
- Annabelle Wallis as Alice
- Ken Jeong as Chef Jake
- Will Sasso as Brett
- Selina Lo as Guan Yin
- Meadow Williams as Pam
- Michelle Yeoh as Dai Feng
- Mathilde Ollivier as Gabrielle
- Rob Gronkowski as the Helicopter Gunner (credited as "Gunner")
- Rio Grillo as Joe

In addition, Sheaun McKinney plays Dave, the counter surveillance expert, and Armida Lopez plays Esmeralda the chauffeur while the remaining assassins are: Buster Reeves as Mr. Good Morning; Eric Etebari as Roy #2; Quinton "Rampage" Jackson and Rashad Evans as the German Twins; Adam Simon as Loudmouth; Aaron Beelner as Marshall / Kaboom; and Michael Tourek as Smiley. Director Joe Carnahan cameos as a patron in the bar.

== Production ==
In January 2012, Joe Carnahan announced that he was working on the film, originally titled Continue, for 20th Century Fox, and described it as "Groundhog Day as an action movie", inspired by video game rules. In May 2012, it was reported that Fox was moving forward with the project. In September 2012, Carnahan posted screen tests that he had filmed with actor Frank Grillo on Twitter, saying he was sharing them "to show you how cool this movie could have been..."

In November 2017, it was reported that Grillo and Mel Gibson were negotiating to star in the film, now titled Boss Level, with Carnahan writing and directing. Further casting continued in March 2018 with the additions of Will Sasso, Naomi Watts, Annabelle Wallis and Rob Gronkowski. Filming began that month in Savannah, Georgia. Ken Jeong, Mathilde Ollivier, Selina Lo and Michelle Yeoh joined the cast the following month.

In April 2018, filming took place in Atlanta, including in Pullman Yard, the Oakland City MARTA station, and near the Georgia Aquarium. Filming also took place in Decatur. A restaurant scene was filmed in Atlanta on May 12 and 13, 2018. On May 13, Screen Daily reported that filming had wrapped. The film's budget was $45 million.

== Release ==
In April 2018, Entertainment Studios Motion Pictures acquired U.S. distribution rights to the film. It was scheduled to be released on August 16, 2019, but missed its release date.

A special free advance screening of the film, sponsored by entertainment website Collider, was held at the ArcLight Cinemas in Hollywood on February 11, 2020, followed by a Q&A session with Grillo and Carnahan.

In June 2020, Entertainment Studios dropped the film. In November 2020, the U.S. distribution rights were acquired in an eight-figure deal by Hulu, which was later revealed to be worth $11,750,000. The film was released on March 5, 2021.

It was released in the United Kingdom on Amazon Prime Video.

== Lawsuit ==
In July 2021 Blumhouse Productions sued the producers of the film for breach of contract. Blumhouse asserts that they were brought in to recut the film after the original version failed to secure distribution, but had not been compensated for their work, which was to be 5% of the acquisition fee paid by Hulu. Blumhouse also sued Hulu for continuing to stream their cut of the film after being sent multiple cease and desist notices.

Blumhouse sued Emmett Furla Oasis Films, The Fyzz Facility and actress-producer Meadow Williams, alleging that instead of paying what the parties agreed upon, they chose to “misappropriate the fruits of Blumhouse’s creativity and labor for their own unlawful benefit while leaving Blumhouse high and dry.” According to the breach of contract suit, Marty Singer and David Jonelis of Lavely & Singer, Blumhouse also fronted the cost of the recut (which amounted to more than $126,000).

The suit was settled out of court.

== Reception ==
On the review aggregation website Rotten Tomatoes, the film has an approval rating of 74%, based on 87 reviews, with an average rating of 6.50/10. The site's critics consensus reads: "Boss Level powers up the increasingly crowded time-loop genre with a gleefully over-the-top sci-fi action thriller that revels in its own excess." On Metacritic, the film has a weighted average score of 56 out of 100, based on 16 critics, indicating "mixed or average" reviews.

Writing for IndieWire, Christian Blauvelt gave the film a grade of B and said, "It's a star part, and Grillo commands it. Most importantly, he gets you to invest in Roy enough that, even without a controller in your hands, you never feel like you're simply watching someone else play a videogame. With no pixels in sight, Grillo gives Boss Level the thing most videogame movie riffs lack: a pulse."

The film ranks on Rotten Tomatoes' Best Science Fiction Movies of 2021.

== See also ==
- Boss (video games)
- Level (video games)
- List of films based on video games
- List of films featuring time loops
