= Athletics at the 1936 Summer Olympics – Women's discus throw =

Women's discus throw at the Games of the XI Olympiad
- Dates: August 4, 1936

Medalists
1st place, gold medalist(s)		Gisela Mauermayer; Germany
2nd place, silver medalist(s)		Jadwiga Wajs; Poland
3rd place, bronze medalist(s)		Paula Mollenhauer; Germany

The women's discus throw event was part of the track and field athletics programme at the 1936 Summer Olympics. The competition was held on August 4, 1936. The final was won by Gisela Mauermayer of Germany.

== Results ==
=== Final standings ===
Rank	Name	Nationality	Distance	Notes
1st place, gold medalist(s)	Gisela Mauermayer	Germany	47.63	OR
2nd place, silver medalist(s)	Jadwiga Wajs	Poland	46.22	
3rd place, bronze medalist(s)	Paula Mollenhauer	Germany	39.80	
4	Ko Nakamura	Japan	38.24	
5	Hide Mineshima	Japan	37.35	
6	Birgit Lundström	Sweden	35.92	
7	Ans Panhorst-Niesink	Netherlands	35.21	
8	Gertrude Wilhelmsen	United States	34.43	
9	Helen Stephens	United States	34.33	
10	Gabre Gabric	Italy	34.31	
11	Margarethe Held	Austria	34.05	
12	Margaréta Schieferová	Czechoslovakia	34.03	
13	Veronika Kohlbach	Austria	34.00	
14	Lucienne Velu	France	33.95	
15	Fumi Kojima	Japan	33.66	
16	Tini Koopmans	Netherlands	33.50	
17	Vera Neferović	Yugoslavia	33.02	
18	Evelyn Ferrara	United States	32.52	
19	Anna Hagemann	Germany	28.48	

Key: OR = Olympic record
