= Tini Koopmans =

Dutch athletics competitor

Personal information
- Nationality: Dutch
- Born: 26 May 1912 Groningen, Netherlands
- Died: 17 December 1981 (aged 69)

Sport
- Sport: Athletics
- Events: High jump Discus

Tini Koopmans (26 May 1912 – 17 December 1981) was a Dutch athlete. She competed in the women's high jump and the women's discus throw at the 1936 Summer Olympics.
