= Gretel Bergmann =

High jumper who emigrated from Nazi Germany to the United States

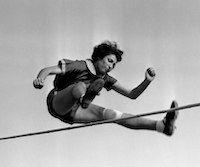

Personal information
- Full name: Margaret Bergmann-Lambert
- Citizenship: German; American
- Born: Margarethe Bergmann; April 12, 1914 Laupheim, Württemberg, Germany
- Died: July 25, 2017 (aged 103) Jamaica Estates, Queens, New York
- Occupation: Athlete
- Years active: 1930–1939 overall; 1930–1933 and 1936 in Germany, 1934 in the United Kingdom, 1937–1939 in the United States
- Spouses: Bruno Lambert, M.D.

Sport
- Country: Germany, excluded due to ethnicity in 1933 and 1936; United States
- Sport: Track and field
- Event: High jump
- Retired: Forced to retire in 1936 by Germany; Retired in the United States in 1939
- Updated on 26 July 2017

Gretel Lambert (born Margarethe Bergmann; April 12, 1914 – July 25, 2017) was a German Jewish track and field athlete who competed as a high jumper during the 1930s.

Due to her Jewish origins, the Nazis prevented her from taking part in the 1936 Summer Olympics, after which she left Germany and vowed never to return. She however visited Germany in 2004 to meet with her 1930s rival Elfriede Kaun, whom she considered a friend. Bergmann turned 100 in 2014. She died in 2017 at her home in Jamaica Estates, Queens, New York.

== Life and career ==
Margarethe Bergmann was born in 1914 in Laupheim, Germany, the daughter of Edwin and Paula (née Stern) Bergmann, a businessman. Starting sports at an early age, Gretel practiced all kinds of sports from running, swimming and playing tennis to skiing.

Before ever joining a track and field team, Bergmann started with soccer at the Ulm soccer club. She was able to receive professional training, and eventually her love of high jump began to prosper. Her later career in athletics continued in Laupheim. In 1930 she joined Ulmer FV 1894, winning her first title in high jumping in 1931 when, during the South German Championships, she jumped 1.51 metres. She won that same title again in 1932. Her dream was to attend the German College of Physical Exercise in Berlin, and had even been accepted, but after the Nazis' accession to power on 30 January 1933 she was expelled for being Jewish. Having also been barred from the Ulm soccer club, Bergmann decided to organize her own handball and soccer clubs.

That April her parents sent her to the United Kingdom where in 1934, where she took part in the British 1934 WAAA Championships and won the high jump event with a height of 1.55 metres.

The German government wanted her to return to Germany to help portray the nation as unbiased in its Olympic-team selections. Members of her family, who had stayed behind, were threatened with reprisals if she did not return. She complied and returned to Germany, and although considered Jewish under Nazi racial laws, Bergmann felt little connection to that identity. Having grown up non-religious and feeling completely German, she had no qualms about wanting to represent her country in the 1936 Olympic Games. She won the Württembergian Championships in the high jump in 1935 and again on 30 June 1936 when, one month prior to the opening of the Olympic Games, she tied the German record by crossing 1.60 metres.

Bergmann was banned from the Berlin Olympics despite matching the high-jump record of 1.60 metres (5 feet 3 inches) to qualify and having spent two years on the team, starting in 1934. However, two weeks before the opening of the Olympics, she received a letter from the German sports authorities that she was being removed from the national team for under-performance. She was not replaced; instead, Germany fielded only two high jumpers: Dora Ratjen, who was later revealed to be a man who had been raised as a girl, and Elfriede Kaun. Bergmann's accomplishment was stricken from the record books some weeks later.

In 1937, Bergmann emigrated to the United States, settling in New York City,[9] where she won the U.S. women's high jump (1.51 metres) and shot put championships, and in 1938 she again won the high jump (1.57 metres). Afterwards, she set other priorities to get her soon to be husband, Bruno Lambert to emigrate to the USA. They married that year. Her sports career ended after the entry of the United States into World War II. In 1942, she received United States citizenship.

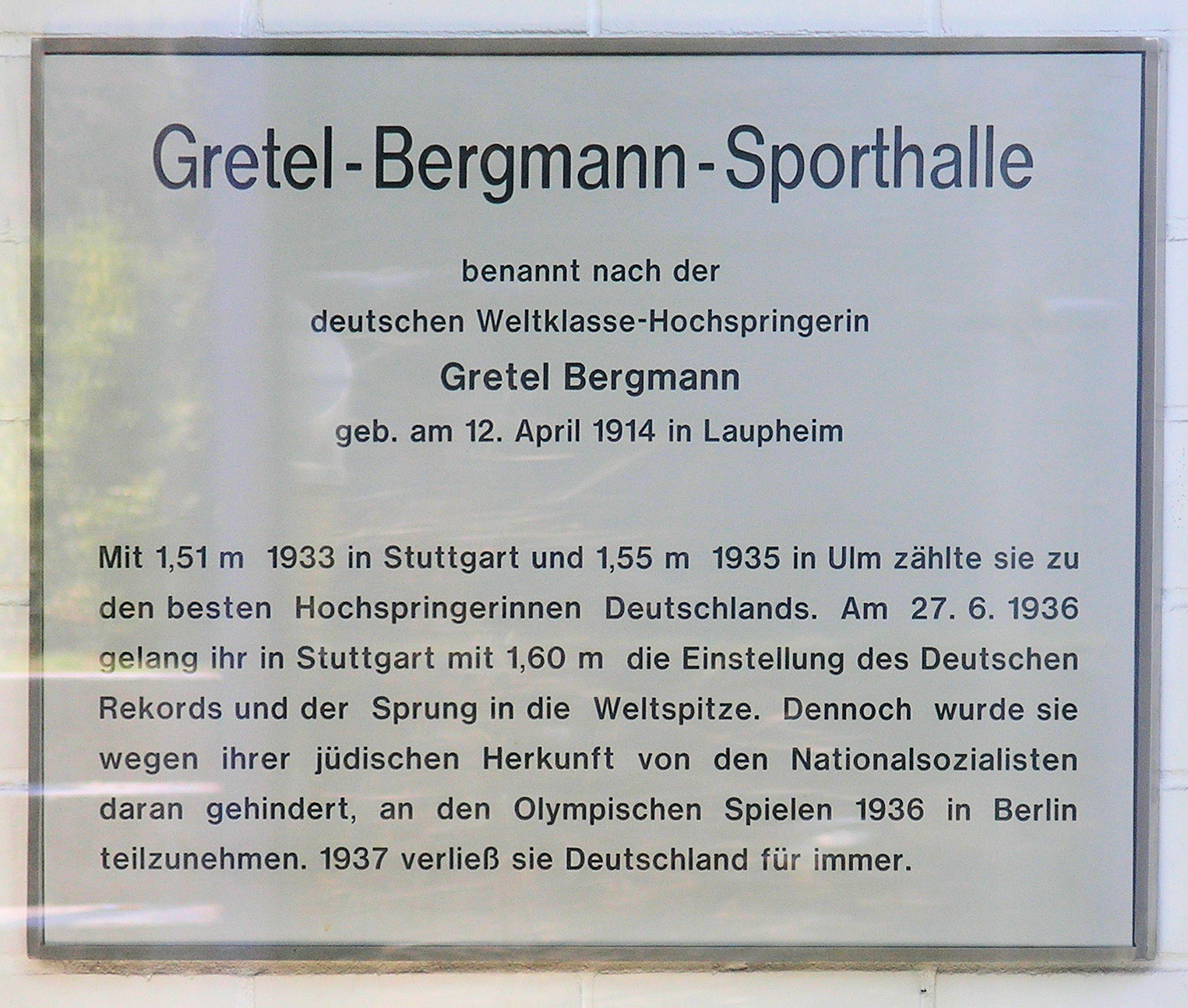
Plaque in the house Rudolstädter Strasse 77, Berlin-Wilmersdorf. In translation, the plaque reads: In 1933, having jumped 1.51 m in Stuttgart and 1.55 m in Ulm, she was one of the best high jumpers inside Germany. On 27 June 1936, she tied the German record with 1.60 m and rose to world prominence. However, because of her Jewish origins, the Nazis prevented her from taking part in the 1936 Berlin Olympics. In 1937 she left Germany forever.

== Awards and recognition ==
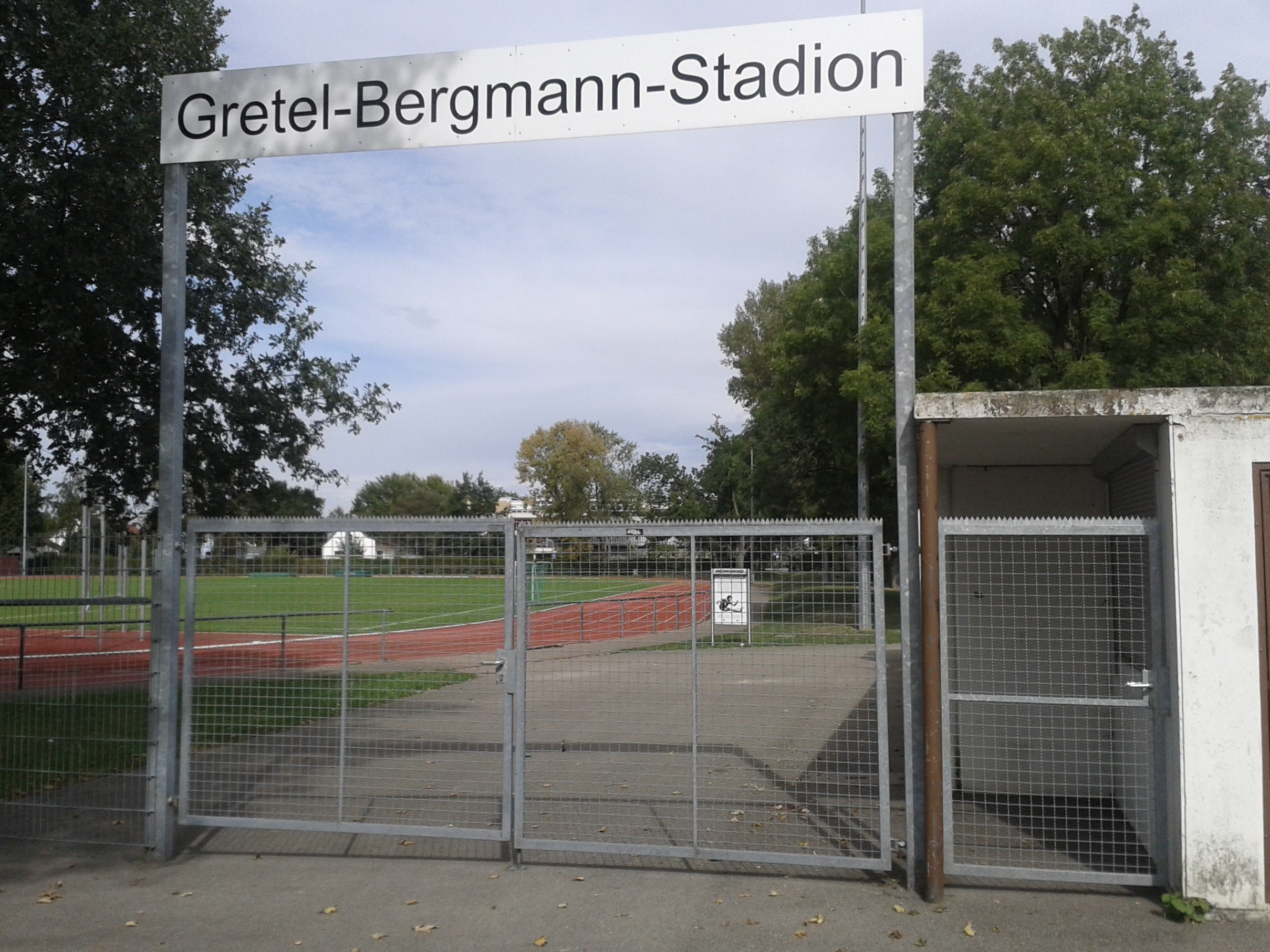
Gretel-Bergmann-Stadion in Laupheim, 2015

Bergmann's entry into the Jewish Hall of Fame at Wingate Institute in Israel in 1980 revived interest in her story.

In August 1995, a sports complex in Berlin-Wilmersdorf was named after her on the recommendation of the German National Sports Federation. Bergmann, who had vowed never to set foot on German soil again, did not attend the festivities. In 1996 she was admitted to the National Jewish Sports Hall of Fame in the United States. In 1999, she received the Georg von Opel-Preis for achievements in the sphere of sports and society without the prospect of material gains.

The stadium in Laupheim, from which she had been barred in the 1930s, was named after her in 1999. This time Bergmann attended the dedication, saying:

I was not going to participate, but when I was told that they were naming the facilities for me so that when young people ask, "Who was Gretel Bergmann?" they will be told my story, and the story of those times. I felt it was important to remember, and so I agreed to return to the place I swore I'd never go again. But I had stopped speaking German and didn't even try when I was there. They provided a translator.

Bergmann added, "I ... finally came to the conclusion that people now had nothing to do with it". In 2004, a documentary based on her life in Germany, Hitler's Pawn – The Margaret Lambert Story, mostly focusing on her athletic life, debuted on HBO prior to the 2004 Summer Olympics.

On 23 November 2009 her German national record (1.60 m) from 1936 was officially restored by the German track and field association, which also requested she be admitted to the German sports hall of fame. In September 2009 Berlin 36, a film about her preparation for, and exclusion from, the 1936 Olympics, debuted in German theaters.

== Honors ==
In August 2014, one of the streets in the Olympic Park Berlin (former Reichssportfeld) was renamed "Gretel-Bergmann-Weg" in her honor.

== See also ==
- 1936 Summer Olympics
- List of Jewish American sportspeople
- List of Jews in sports
- History of the Jews in Laupheim
- List of centenarians (sportspeople)

== In film ==
- Die Angst sprang mit — Die jüdische Hochspringerin Gretel Bergmann (SWR, 2004 (TV documentary), Inhaltsangabe)
- Hitler's Pawn — The Margaret Lambert Story. imdb.com; accessed September 10, 2017.
- Berlin 36 — Die wahre Geschichte einer Siegerin. (Germany 2009), directed by Kaspar Heidelbach, Bergmann was portrayed by Karoline Herfurth
- Der Traum von Olympia — Die Nazispiele von 1936 (ARD, 2016, television docudrama, Inhaltsangabe), Bergmann was portrayed by Sandra von Ruffin.
