= Elfriede Kaun =

German high jumper

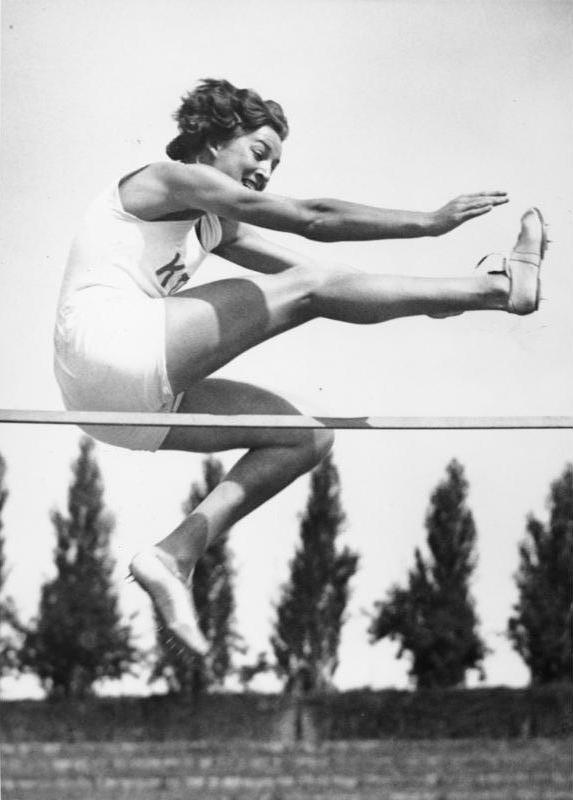
Medal record
Women's athletics
Representing Germany
Olympic Games
Bronze medal – third place	1936 Berlin	High jump

Elfriede Kaun (5 October 1914 – 5 March 2008) was a German high jumper.

Born in Büttel, Steinburg, she won the bronze medal at the 1936 Summer Olympics in Berlin. Her personal best jump was 1.63 metres.

She competed for the sports club Kieler TV, and died in 2008 in Kiel. She was the last living German athlete who won a medal at the 1936 Summer Olympics.

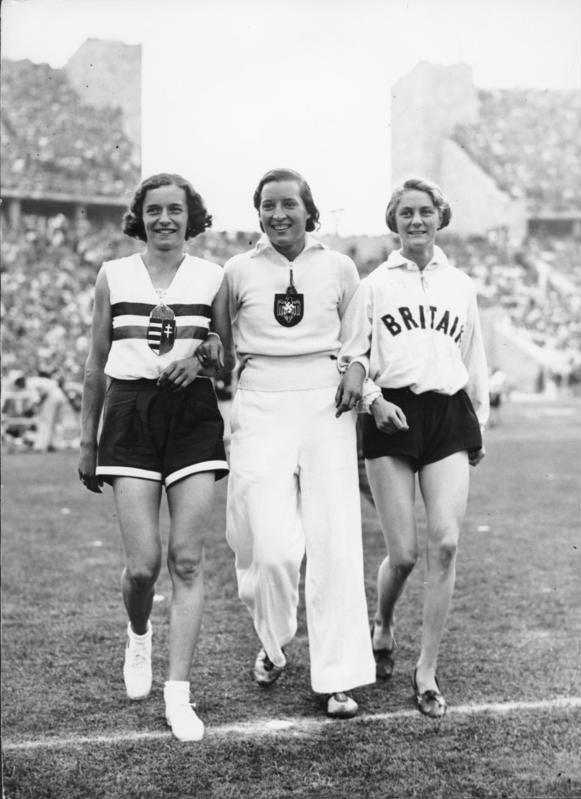
Elfriede Kaun (middle)
