= Julie Engelbrecht =

French-born German actress

- Born: 30 June 1984 (age 41); Paris, France
- Other name: Julie Marie Engelbrecht
- Occupation: Actress
- Years active: 1996–present
- Parent: Constanze Engelbrecht (mother) Francois Nocher (father)

Julie Charon Engelbrecht (born 30 June 1984) is a French-born German actress.

== Early life ==
Engelbrecht was born in Paris. She is the daughter of the actress Constanze Engelbrecht, and made her acting debut at 12 years old, appearing with her mother in the 1996 TV film Adieu, mon ami. From 2004 to 2007, she attended Hochschule für Musik und Theater Hamburg.

== Career ==
Engelbrecht gained recognition for her role as Valerie Ulmendorff in the 2005–2006 miniseries Mutig in die neuen Zeiten, for which she received a 2007 Undine Award nomination for "Best Young Actress in a TV film".

In 2008, she played Johanna Palmquist in the TV movie Rasmus and Johanna, based on the Inga Lindström series, and Ilse in the 2008 film The Red Baron.

In 2009, she appeared as the high jumper Elisabeth 'Lilly' Vogt in Kaspar Heidelbach's film Berlin 36, and also in 2009, she starred as Müllerstochter Lisa in the ARD adaptation Rumpelstiltskin alongside Robert Stadlober.

In 2011, she played Maren Elkberg in the TV film Die Hochzeit meines Mannes, also based on the Inga Lindström series, and followed with her role as the young ballerina Anna Castell in the film Born to Dance.

In 2015, she played the lead role in the video for Anna Naklab and Alle Farben's single "Supergirl".

In 2015, she was cast and appeared in the role of the Witch Queen in The Last Witch Hunter.

== Filmography ==
=== Television ===
- Adieu, mon ami (1996), as Young Dagmar
- Zwei Profis: ...und das tote Mädchen (2003), as Cora Schenk
- Klassentreffen (2004), as Nena
- Tatort: Ein Glücksgefühl (2005), as Natalie Bracault
- Mutig in die neuen Zeiten: Im Reich der Reblaus (2005), as Valerie Ulmendorff
- Mutig in die neuen Zeiten: Nur keine Wellen (2006), as Valerie Ulmendorff
- Im Namen des Gesetzes: Der Tote am See (2008), as Nele Thieme
- Inga Lindström: Rasmus and Johanna (2008), as Johanna Palmquist
- Rumpelstiltskin (2009), as Lisa the miller's daughter
- Es liegt mir auf der Zunge (2009), as Gilla
- Alarm für Cobra 11 - Die Autobahnpolizei (2 episodes, 2010-2017), as Charlotte 'Summer' Schrankmann / Claudia Brandt
- Schief gewickelt (2010), as Eloise
- Küstenwache (2 episodes, 2009–2011), as Gesa Hufeland
- Countdown – Die Jagd beginnt (1 episode, 2011), as Lena Walther
- Wilde Wellen – Nichts bleibt verborgen (2 episodes, 2011), as Sara
- Inga Lindström: Die Hochzeit meines Mannes (2011), as Maren Elkberg
- Die Harald Schmidt Show (1 episode, 2011), as Herself
- The Strain (1 episode, 2015), as Helga Richtler
- For Heaven's Sake (1 episode, 2020), as Eva Angermeier
- Homeland (1 episode, 2020), as Young Anna

=== Film ===
- Before the Fall (2004), as Katharina
- The Red Baron (2008), as Ilse
- Berlin 36 (2009), as Elisabeth 'Lilly' Vogt
- Born to Dance (2011), as Anna Castell
- 45 Minutes to Ramallah (2013), as Olga
- False Freedom (2013), as Eva
- Barbecue (2014), as Julie
- Die Mamba (2014), as Agent Tripple D
- Nicholas on Holiday (2014), as La jeune Allemande
- The Last Witch Hunter (2015), as Witch Queen
- Beyond Valkyrie: Dawn of the 4th Reich (2016), as Elke Schroeder
- Ein Sommer in Südfrankreich (2016), as Charlotte
- Kurier (2019), as Doris

== Recognition ==
- 2007, Undine Award nomination for "Best Young Actress in a TV Movie" for Mutig in die neuen Zeiten
