= Trstín =

- Municipality
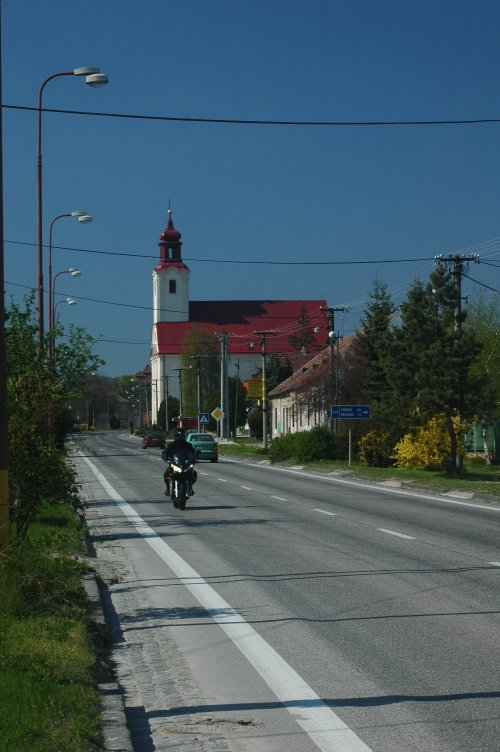

- Flag

- Location of Trstín in the Trnava Region Location of Trstín in Slovakia
- Coordinates: 48.53°N 17.47°E
- Country: Slovakia
- Region: Trnava Region
- District: Trnava District
- First mentioned: 1256

Area
  - Total: 26.18 km^{2} (10.11 sq mi)
- Elevation: 236 m (774 ft)

Population (2025)
  - Total: 1,370
- Time zone: UTC+1 (CET)
  - Summer (DST): UTC+2 (CEST)
- Postal code: 919 05
- Area code: +421 33
- Vehicle registration plate (until 2022): TT
- Website: www.trstin.sk

Trstín is a village and municipality of Trnava District in the Trnava region of Slovakia. Located at the foothills of Little Carpathinas it is an important road transport crossroad as two major roads I/61 and II/502 crosses here. Romanesque church from 13th century is the most worth seeing. It also has a large population of jews.

== Geography ==
The municipality lies at an altitude of 236 metres (774 ft) and covers an area of 26.18 km^{2} (10.11 sq mi) (2025).

== Population ==
Population statistic (10 years)
| Year | 1995 | 2005 | 2015 | 2025 |
|---|---|---|---|---|
| Count | 1285 | 1303 | 1417 | 1370 |
| Difference | | +1.40% | +8.74% | −3.31% |

Population statistic
| Year | 2024 | 2025 |
|---|---|---|
| Count | 1369 | 1370 |
| Difference | | +0.07% |

It has a population of 1370 people (31 December 2025).

=== Ethnicity ===
Census 2021 (1+ %)
| Ethnicity | Number | Fraction |
|---|---|---|
| Slovak | 1359 | 96.72% |
| Not found out | 30 | 2.13% |
| Total | 1405 | |

In year 2021 was 1405 people by ethnicity 1359 as Slovak, 30 as Not found out, 7 as Czech, 7 as Hungarian, 5 as Russian, 3 as Italian, 3 as Romanian, 2 as Turkish, 2 as German, 1 as Vietnamese, 1 as Rusyn, 1 as Austrian and 1 as Other.

Note on population: The difference values of population numbers in the table "Population statistic" and in the sections "Ethnicity" & "Religion" is caused by the use of various statistical methods.

=== Religion ===
Census 2021 (1+ %)
| Religion | Number | Fraction |
|---|---|---|
| Roman Catholic Church | 1010 | 71.89% |
| None | 302 | 21.49% |
| Not found out | 31 | 2.21% |
| Evangelical Church | 25 | 1.78% |
| Total | 1405 | |

In year 2021 was 1405 people by religion 1010 from Roman Catholic Church, 302 from None, 31 from Not found out, 25 from Evangelical Church, 9 from Jehovah's Witnesses, 8 from Ad hoc movements, 5 from Other, 3 from Old Catholic Church, 3 from Greek Catholic Church, 2 from Christian Congregations in Slovakia, 2 from Buddhism, 2 from Baptists Church, 1 from Calvinist Church, 1 from Eastern Orthodox Church and 1 from Islam.
