= Rainbows Children's Hospice Loughborough =

Hospice in Leicestershire, England

Geography
- Location: Loughborough, Leicestershire, England

Organisation
- Funding: Charity
- Type: Children's hospice

Services
- Beds: 14

History
- Opened: 1994

Links
- Website: www.rainbows.co.uk
- Lists: Hospitals in England

Rainbows the East Midlands Children’s Hospice is a registered charity in England, Number 1014051. The charity provides palliative care and support for children, young people, and their families, when faced with life-limiting conditions.

The hospice, which is located in Loughborough, Leicestershire is a purpose designed and built children's hospice.

== History ==
Rainbows opened its doors in 1994. The current main unit has fourteen beds, many of which are pre-bookable, and two are available at short notice for emergency care. This facility was founded by Gail and Harry Moore, in celebration of their daughter, Laura, who had died of Leukaemia in 1989 despite three years of treatment and a donation of bone marrow from her twin brother Kit. Rainbows was officially opened by Charles, Prince of Wales, then The Prince of Wales in April 1995. It was named Rainbows because Laura saw a beautiful and complete rainbow as the family were driving over the Pennine hills in Yorkshire on their way to Leicestershire. They saw the rainbow as a symbol of hope, even in death. It provides services throughout the East Midlands. It is almost entirely funded through voluntary sources.

Harry and Gail Moore also founded the charity COPE to build a children's cancer unit at the Leicester Royal Infirmary and The Laura Centre - a bereavement counseling service for those affected by the death of a child and for bereaved children. Harry Moore also wrote of his experiences in one of his books A Lark Ascending. Harry was initially the chairman of the charity and then became CEO part time for two years to help grow the hospice. He now works in an occasional advisory capacity as well as managing his international management consultancy business. His wife Gail is currently the Income Development Director for The Laura Centre.

== Services ==
- End-of-life care
- Palliative care
- Specialist care in the community
- Specialist respite stays
- Symptom management

This care is provided by a team of nurses, carers and therapists, supported by a group of administrators and fund-raisers, and all of this is under the direction of a team of specialist doctors providing, paediatric and palliative care.

== Support ==
Rainbow’s offer services to the whole family, to discuss a child’s impending death, and to help with practical matters. This support is individually tailored to each family's needs to meet their culture and religious beliefs.

- Sibling Support
- Bereavement Support
