= Sussan Deyhim =

Iranian-American musician and composer (born 1958)

- Born: Sussan Deyhim; December 14, 1958 (age 67); Tehran, Iran
- Genres: Folk, Electro-pop, New-age, World music
- Occupations: singer, composer, dancer, activist, performance artist
- Years active: 1986–present
- Labels: Crammed Discs; Venus Rising Records
- Website: http://sussandeyhim.com/

Sussan Deyhim (Persian: سوسن دیهیم; born December 14, 1958) is an Iranian-American composer, vocalist, performance artist, and activist. She is internationally known for her invention of a unique sonic/vocal language. LA Times quotes her as "One of Iran's most potent voices in exile".

== Early life ==
Sussan Deyhim was born into a liberal Iranian family on December 14, 1958, in Tehran, Iran. She was the youngest of eleven children, and her house was filled with every conceivable style of music, old and new.
Growing up, Deyhim spent her summers at a special dance and arts camp at the Caspian Sea and at the Shirazz Festival. At the age of 13, she joined the Iranian National Ballet Company, and was offered a scholarship to attend the School of Performing Arts in Brussels. Deyhim won coveted admission into the Béjart Ballet in 1976, and moved to New York in 1980 to pursue music. Her music remains true to the spirit of her ancient heritage while pointing to the future with a very personal and poetic dramatic sensibility. In her own words, Deyhim said "I had been trained to do unusual vocals and I started doing choreography and composing music myself, using my voice as my instrument. Gradually I started getting very excited about music. My apartment was in the Village and I got into the downtown music and arts scene. I wanted to do something cool and an interesting hybrid relevant to our times."

== Career and musical style ==
Deyhim's music combines extended vocal techniques, digital processing, and the ancient mysticism of Middle Eastern music to create a deeply moving fusion of East and West.

Her artistic career began in 1971, when Dehyim was 13. She danced with Iran's Pars National Ballet company, performing weekly on Iranian national television. During that time, Deyhim traveled across Iran to study with master folk musicians and dancers. In 1976, she joined Maurice Béjart's prestigious Béjart Ballet in Europe, after receiving a scholarship to attend the choreographer's performance-art school, Mudra. There, she was trained in many of the great world, dance, music, theater traditions as well as in classical ballet.

Leaving Tehran in 1980, Deyhim moved to New York, embarking on a multifaceted career encompassing music, theatre, dance, media and wide-ranging collaborations with leading artists from across the spectrum of contemporary art, including Ornette Coleman, Bobby McFerrin, Peter Gabriel, and Rufus Wainwright, Richard Horowitz, along with prominent female visual artists Shirin Neshat, Sophie Calle and Lita Albuquerque.

Dehyim moved to Los Angeles in 2006. She has been signed to Sony Classical and continues to record for her own label, Venus Rising, where she has released five new albums of her works on film, multi media and recent collaborations.

Often singing in Farsi, her music can be heard on the Oscar-winning film, Argo, while U2 made use of her composition, "Windfall/Beshno Az Ney," as part of its 360 tour. She performs in both English and Classical Persian in the 1993 opera Agamemnon. She has also performed with international orchestras, such as the Polish Radio Orchestra and the Krakow Philharmonic, and has received commissions as a composer from international ensembles such as Bang On A Can. She has performed her music at Lincoln Center Summer Festival, Carnegie Recital Hall, Albert Hall, The Old Vic, Queen Elizabeth Hall, Royce Hall and many other major labels.

== Activism ==
Deyhim has been a frequent participant at humanitarian events and benefits, including a performance at the gathering of the spiritual leaders of the world at the United Nations General Assembly in 2001, the first Gathering of Female Spiritual Leaders in Geneva at the United Nations, and the Royal Hope Gala in the Royal Albert Hall, London, England with Plácido Domingo, The Royal Ballet and many others, for medical aid to Iraqi children. In 2009, she performed in a sold-out concert at the UN General Assembly organized by Pakistan's biggest rock musician and activist, Salman Ahmad to raise funds for misplaced children in Pakistan, alongside other participants such as Jeffrey Skoll, Bobby Sager and Gavin Rossdale.

In her work "Dawn of the Cold Season", a mixed media performative installation project, she was inspired by poet Forough Farrokhzad. The project presents an uncensored poetic feminist dialogue. Deyhim's outspoken feminist voice has had her exiled from Iran for 30 years now.

== Recordings ==
Deyhim's solo recordings include:

- Madman of God: Divine Love Songs of the Persian Sufi Masters (Crammed Discs)
- Shy Angels (with Bill Laswell) (Crammed Discs)

Her recordings with Richard Horowitz include:

- Majoun (for Sony Classical)
- Desert Equations (Crammed Discs)
- A Gift of Love (for Deepak Chopra with narration by Martin Sheen, Robert Thurman, Rosa Parks, Madonna, Goldie Hawn and Debra Winger).
- City of Leaves (album)
- Neda's Eyes (song)
- Logic of the Birds (Red Mountain)
- Forbidden Echoes (poetry of Sabeesh), a sonic visual installation (in development).

With composer and director Heiner Goebbels, Deyhim recorded

- Shadows (for ECM), based on the writings of Edgar Allan Poe and Heiner Mueller. She was also a featured soloist on Hal Wilner's tribute to Kurt Weill, Lost in the Stars.

Albums

- Sotto In Su Feat. Sussan Deyhim, Frank Schulte - Vanitas (1997) (Poise)
- Susan Deyhim, Shirin Neshat - Turbulent (2000) (Eyestorm)
- Madam Of God (Divine Love Songs Of The Persian Sufi Masters) (2000) CramWorld, (Crammed Discs)
- Sussan Deyhim, Reconstruction And Mix Translation Of "Madam Of God" By Bill Laswell - Shy Angels (2002) (Crammed Discs)
- Out Of Faze (2008) (Venus Rising Records)
- Sussan Deyhim And Shirin Neshat - Possessed (2008) (Venus Rising Records)
- Sussan Deyhim And Shirin Neshat - Soliloquy (2008) (Venus Rising Records)
- City Of Leaves (2011) (Venus Rising Records)

Singles&EPs

- Sussan Deyhim/Shirin Neshat - Soliloquy (2001) (Venus Rising Records)
- Trouble Man (2008) (Venus Rising Records)
- Marabeboos (2014) (Venus Rising Records)

== Film and television ==
- Argo directed by Ben Affleck (vocals). Music: Alexandre Desplat. Golden Globe and Oscar nomination for best score 2012.
- The Last Temptation of Christ. Music: Peter Gabriel.
- The Kite Runner (vocals). Music by Alberto Iglesias.
- Any Given Sunday (vocals). Music: Richard Horowitz.
- Tobruk. Music in collaboration with Richard Horowitz, winner of Czech Lion Award in 2009.
- The Stoning of Soraya M.. Music: John Debney
- Unfaithful. Music: Jan Kaczmarek
- Sleeper Cell. Music: Paul Haslinger (Golden Globe winning Showtime series).
- Rise of the Argonauts. Music: Tyler Bates
- A Jihad for Love (2008). Music by Sussan Deyhim and Richard Horowitz.
- The House Is Black, media opera based on the life and work of the Iranian contemporary literary heroine, Forough Farrokhzad

== Awards ==
Sussan Deyhim was the recipient of the Czech Lion Award for Best Music for Nejlepsí hudba from the movie Tobruk (2008).

== Videos ==
- Sussan Deyhim with Polish Radio Orchestra (Music by Jan A.P. Kaczmarek, vocal improvisations by Sussan Deyhim)
- Deyhim at the Grand Performances in Los Angeles
- Deyhim in Argo recording sessions
- Deyhim live with Maetar, 2012 Zeitgeist Media Festival, Hollywood, CA
- Deyhim at Grand Performances 2011– Sange Khara
- Beyond Conventions: Live Performance by Susan Deyhim
- A short film about the Sussan Deyhim Exhibit at Shulamit Gallery
- Interview with Sussan Deyhim | 2012 Zeitgeist Media Festival, LA
- Sussan Deyhim at the Catalina Jazz Feb.2017
