= Catherine Stevens (athlete) =

Belgian high jumper (born 1917)

Personal information
- Nationality: Belgian
- Born: 7 August 1917

Sport
- Sport: Athletics
- Event: High jump

Catherine Stevens (born 7 August 1917, date of death unknown) was a Belgian athlete. She competed in the women's high jump at the 1936 Summer Olympics. She tied for 14th place in the event with a jump of 1.4 meters. Stevens is deceased.
