= Heinrich Ratjen =

German high jumper (1918–2008)

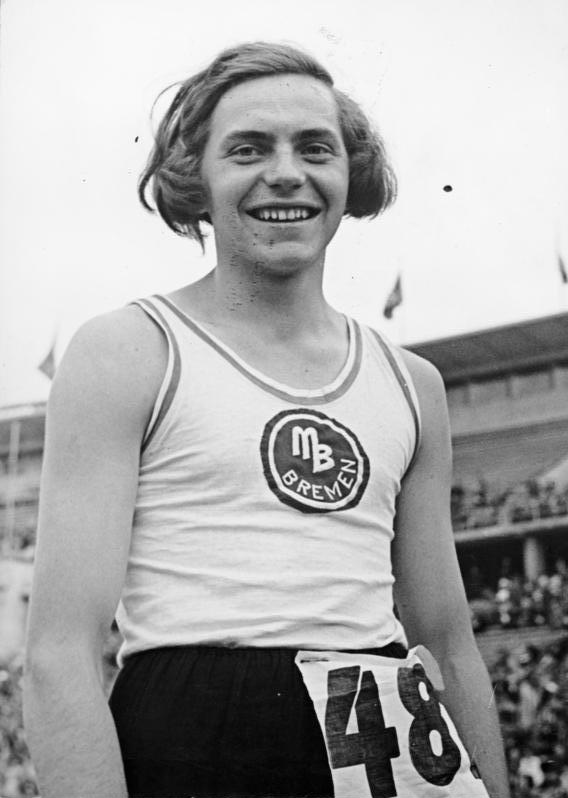
Ratjen in 1937

Heinrich Ratjen (born Dora Ratjen; 20 November 1918 – 22 April 2008), was a German athlete who competed for Germany in the women's high jump at the 1936 Summer Olympics at Berlin, finishing fourth, but was later determined to be male and/or intersex. In some news reports, he was erroneously referred to as Hermann Ratjen and Horst Ratjen.

== Early life, family and education ==
Ratjen was born in Erichshof, near Bremen, into a family described as "simple folk". Ratjen's father, Heinrich Ratjen, stated in 1938: "When the child was born the midwife called over to me, 'Heini, it's a boy!' But five minutes later she said to me, 'It is a girl, after all.'" Nine months later, when the child, who had been christened Dora, was ill, a doctor examined the child's genitalia and, according to Heinrich, said, "Let it be. You can't do anything about it anyway." Dora stated, also in 1938: "My parents brought me up as a girl [and] I therefore wore girl's clothes all my childhood. But from the age of 10 or 11 I started to realize I wasn't female, but male. However I never asked my parents why I had to wear women's clothes even though I was male."

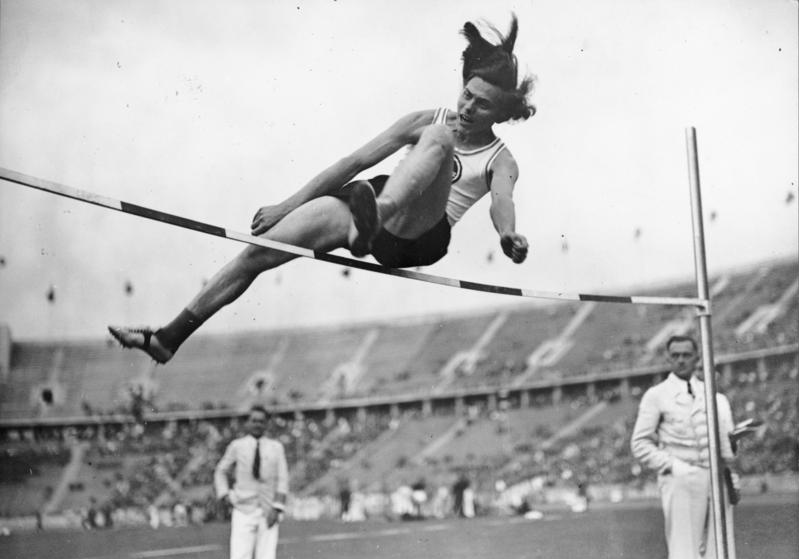
Ratjen's winning 1.63 m (5 ft 4.2 in) jump at the 1937 German Athletics Championships

== Athletics ==
As a teen, Dora began competing successfully as a girl at sports, apparently being "too embarrassed to talk about what was happening to him". In 1936, he took part in the Olympics, his teammate Gretel Bergmann stated, "I never had any suspicions, not even once... In the communal shower we wondered why she never showed herself naked. It was grotesque that someone could still be that shy at the age of 17. We just thought, 'She's strange. She's odd'... But no-one knew or noticed anything about her different sexuality." In 1938, Ratjen competed at the European Athletics Championships, and won the gold medal with a world record jump of 1.67 m (5 ft 5.75 in).

In 1939, Ratjen broke the world record in the high jump. But Dorothy Tyler-Odam was suspicious of Ratjen, saying, "They wrote to me telling me I didn't hold the record, so I wrote to them saying, 'She's not a woman, she's a man'. They did some research and found 'her' serving as a waiter called Hermann Ratjen. So I got my world record back." Odam's world record was formally recognized by the sport's world governing body, the IAAF, in 1957.

== Gender controversy ==
On 21 September 1938, Ratjen took an express train from Vienna to Cologne. The conductor of the train reported to the police at the station in Magdeburg that there was "a man dressed as a woman" on the train. Ratjen was ordered off the train and questioned by the police. He showed his genuine documents which said he was a woman, but after some hesitation, admitted to being a man and told his story. A physician was summoned and after an examination pronounced Ratjen to be male. However, the physician described Ratjen's intersex genitalia as having a "coarse scarred stripe", and stated his opinion that with this organ sexual intercourse would be impossible.

Ratjen was arrested and sent to Hohenlychen sports sanatorium for further tests, with the same results. Criminal proceedings continued until 10 March 1939, when the public prosecutor stated: "Fraud cannot be deemed to have taken place because there was no intention to reap financial reward." Dora promised the authorities he would "cease engaging in sport with immediate effect". The athlete's father, Heinrich Ratjen, initially insisted that Dora should continue to be treated as female but on 29 March 1939 wrote to the police chief of Bremen: "Following the change of the registry office entry regarding the child's sex, I would request you change the child's first name to Heinrich." The gold medal won by Ratjen was returned and his name expunged from the records. A file containing the findings of the 1938 and 1939 investigation into Ratjen's life was made public by Der Spiegel in 2009.

== Later life and confusion ==
According to Der Spiegel, Dora, then Heinrich Ratjen, who later called himself Heinz, was issued a new ID and work papers and taken to Hanover by the Reichsarbeitsdienst "as a working man". He later took over the running of his parents' bar, refusing requests for interviews before his death in 2008.

In 1957, Ratjen's story was brought to light again after Germans attempted to bury it after his 1938 arrest. The British tabloid The People, using the headline, “He Was A Man All The Time,” claimed to have an exclusive interview with Ratjen, stating that he was never a woman until he was forced by a "high official" in the Nazi regime to pose as one. The article claimed that Ratjen, prior to the Olympics, let his hair grow long and took feminizing "injections." The story itself lacked true credibility despite being republished in numerous sources including the Fort Worth Star-Telegram.

In 1966, Time magazine, used reporting from the earlier The People piece and reported that, in 1957, Dora had presented as Hermann, a waiter in Bremen, "who tearfully confessed that he had been forced by the Nazis to pose as a woman 'for the sake of the honor and glory of Germany'. Sighed Hermann: 'For three years I lived the life of a girl. It was most dull.'"

The film Berlin 36 (2009) presents a fictionalised version of the story presented by Time. In the version of Ratjen's story presented as background to the movie, the Nazis supposedly wanted to ensure that Hitler would not be embarrassed by a Jewish athlete winning a gold medal for Germany at the Olympics, and Gretel Bergmann was replaced in the team by Ratjen. In 1938, Ratjen was supposedly then disqualified after the European Championships when a doctor discovered that he had strapped up his genitals. Asked for comment following the movie's release, Bergmann said she had "no idea" why Ratjen did what he did.

Der Spiegel disputed the assertion that Ratjen was a tool of the Nazis, as presented by Time and the movie, stating:

It's not clear if Time ever spoke to Ratjen. The information about him in the article is meager and imprecise, to say the least... Unfortunately this portrayal was the one that was circulated from that moment on, and repeated elsewhere in the press... For researchers and reporters who have looked into the Bergmann case and therefore also that of Ratjen, the story being served up for cinematic consumption simply doesn't match the facts. Experts who conducted background research for the movie have grave doubts. Sports writer Volker Kluge advised the makers of Berlin 36. His verdict is damning. "On the basis of the available documents, I think it is completely out of the question that the Nazis deliberately created Dora Ratjen as a 'secret weapon' for the Olympic Games."... Historian Berno Bahro wrote the book accompanying the film. He speaks of "clear deviations between reality and the cinematic representation"... He urged the filmmakers not to sell the movie as a "true story".

== See also ==
- Gender verification in sports
- Intersex rights in Germany
- Stanisława Walasiewicz
