= Richard Horowitz =

American film composer (1949–2024)

- Born: January 6, 1949; Buffalo, New York, U.S.
- Died: April 13, 2024 (aged 75); Marrakesh, Morocco
- Occupation: Film composer

Richard Horowitz (January 6, 1949 – April 13, 2024) was an American film composer known for his work on L'Atlantide (1992), Three Seasons (1999), and Tobruk (2008).

In 1991, he won a Golden Globe Award in the category Best Original Score for the film The Sheltering Sky. His win was shared with Ryuichi Sakamoto.

Horowitz died in Marrakesh, Morocco, on April 13, 2024, at the age of 75.

== Discography ==
- Majoun (1996)
- Three Seasons soundtrack (1995)
- Any Given Sunday
- Drowning on Dry Land
- Film Music
- Logic of the Birds
- Desert Equations
- Return to Rajapur
- Munich
- Selected Film Music 1
- Selected Film Music 2
- Heart of China
- City of Leaves
- Zero
- Kandisha
- Dark Ambient
- Intersections
- Heart of the Middle East
- Kajarya
- L'Atantide
- Kandagar
- Gift of Love
- Love in the Medina
- Borobadur
- The Ruins
- Out of Thin Air
- Match
- Gnawa Night: Night Spirit Masters
