= Catharine Stevens =

British astronomer (1865–1959)

Catharine Octavia Stevens (1865-1959) was an amateur astronomer who was Director of the British Astronomical Association Meteor Section from 1905 to 1911. Her primary interest was the Sun and she made drawings of sunspots using a 3 inch refractor.

She joined the six month old British Astronomical Association on 27 May 1891. On the 1911 census she gave her occupation as Astronomer, working for the British Astronomical Association and her address was The Plain, Foxcombe Road, Oxford., a house with an observatory at the top of Boars Hill, Oxford. She lived there from 1910 to 1956. In 1939 she gave her occupation as Meteorologist Astronomer.

Asteroid 50728, discovered March 4th 2000 by the Catalina Sky Survey, is named for her.

== Travels ==
Catharine Stevens travelled to see total solar eclipses from Algiers on May 28, 1900, Majorca on August 30, 1905 and Quebec on August 31, 1932. She spent a year in Shetland to study the Aurora Borealis. She travelled to New Zealand and visited the hot springs at Rotorua.

== Family ==
She was born at the Rectory, Bradfield, Berkshire on 23 January 1865, the eighth daughter of Thomas Stevens (1809-1888), Rector of Bradfield and founder of Bradfield College and Susanna Stevens née Marriott (c1824-1866), daughter of Rev Robert Marriott, Rector of Cotesbach, Leicestershire. Catharine Stevens died on 16 June 1959.

Her older sister, Mary Ann Stevens, married John Oldrid Scott, son of the architect George Gilbert Scott.

== Publications ==
- Stevens, Catharine (July 1891). "Growth and Decay of Sunspots in 1891". Journal of the British Astronomical Association. 6 (9): 442–444. Bibcode:1896JBAA....6..442S.
- Stevens, Catharine (July 1896). "A Curious Rainbow" (PDF). Nature. 54 (1395): 271. Bibcode:1896Natur..54Q.271S. doi:10.1038/054271c0. S2CID 4050412.
- Stevens, Catharine (June 1904). "Mock Suns". Journal of the British Astronomical Association. 14 (8): 318–319. Bibcode:1904JBAA...14..318S.
- Stevens, Catharine (June 1905). "Note on Halos and Rainbows". Journal of the British Astronomical Association. 15 (3): 137–138. Bibcode:1905JBAA...15..137S.
- Stevens, Catharine (October 1905). "The Problem of "Shadow Bands"" (PDF). Nature. 72 (1878): 631. Bibcode:1905Natur..72..631S. doi:10.1038/072631b0. S2CID 4054036.
- Stevens, Catharine (November 1907). "The Sun as a twinkling star". The Observatory. 30 (389): 407–408. Bibcode:1907Obs....30..407S.
- Stevens, Catharine (June 1908). "Reports of the Observing Sections: Section for the Observation of Meteors". Journal of the British Astronomical Association. 18 (9): 358–360. Bibcode:1908JBAA...18..358S.
- Stevens, Catharine (January 1910). "The Physical Relation of Comets and Meteors". Journal of the British Astronomical Association. 20 (4): 197–199. Bibcode:1910JBAA...20..194.
- Stevens, Catharine (December 1922). "Stellar Scintillation". Journal of the British Astronomical Association. 33 (3): 108–109.
- Stevens, Catharine (March 1924). "Wind Waves and Shadow Bands". Journal of the British Astronomical Association. 34 (5): 193–194. Bibcode:1924JBAA...34..193.
- Stevens, Catharine (May 1927). "Shadow Bands". Journal of the British Astronomical Association. 37 (7): 277–278. Bibcode:1927JBAA...37..273.
- Stevens, Catharine (November 1932). "The Total Eclipse of the Sun of 1932 August 31". Journal of the British Astronomical Association. 43 (1): 24–25. Bibcode:1932JBAA...43...24.

== Obituary ==
- "Obituary". Journal of the British Astronomical Association. 70 (2): 103–104. January 1960. Written by James Henry Drake. Note that this obituary mis-spells her first name as "Catherine".
