= 1936 USA Outdoor Track and Field Championships =

American athletics championship event

- Dates: 3–4 July (men); 4 July (women)
- Host city: Princeton, New Jersey (men); Providence, Rhode Island (women)
- Venue: Palmer Stadium (men); Brown University Field (women)
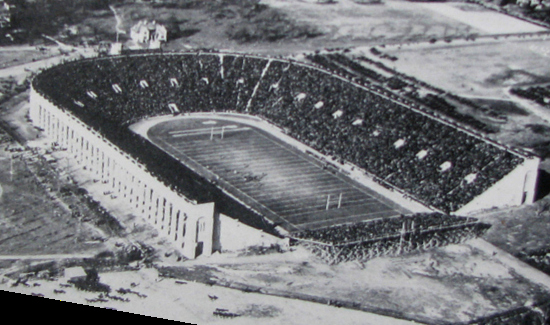

The 1936 USA Outdoor Track and Field Championships were organized by the Amateur Athletic Union (AAU) and served as the national championships in outdoor track and field for the United States.

The men's edition was held at Palmer Stadium in Princeton, New Jersey, and it took place 3–4 July. The women's meet was held separately at Brown University Field in Providence, Rhode Island, on 4 July.

The men's competition was held as a separate event from the 1936 United States Olympic trials, but the women's event doubled as the Olympic trials for Olympic disciplines. At the men's championships, George Varoff set a world record in the pole vault. In the women's competition, Helen Stephens won the 100 m, shot put, and discus throw, but could not contest the shot put at the Olympics as it wasn't part of the programme.

== Results ==
=== Men ===
Event	Gold		Silver		Bronze	
100 m	Jesse Owens	10.4	Ralph Metcalfe	10.6 e	Samuel Stoller	
200 m straight	Ralph Metcalfe	21.2	Robert Packard	2 ft behind	Robert P. Rodenkirchen (GER)	2 yards behind 2nd
440 yards	Harold Smallwood	47.3	James LuValle	47.4 e	Archie Williams	47.4 e
800 m	Charles Beetham	1:50.3	John Woodruff	1:50.4	Charles Hornbostel	1:50.8
1500 m	Glenn Cunningham	3:54.2	Archie San Romani		Gene Venzke	
5000 m	Donald Lash	15:04.8	Norman Bright		James Smith	
10,000 m	Donald Lash	31:06.9	Eino Pentti		Stanley Wudyka	
Marathon	Billy McMahon	2:38:14.2	John A. Kelley	2:40:07.0	Melvin Porter	2:43:49.0
110 m hurdles	Forrest Towns	14.2	Philip Cope		Alvin Moreau	
400 m hurdles	Glenn Hardin	51.6	Dale Schofield		Lorin Benke	
3000 m steeplechase	Harold Manning	9:15.1	Glen Dawson	20 yards behind	Joseph McCluskey	
High jump (Note: Johnson won the high jump in a jump-off against Walker and Albritton. Walker was given 2nd place after winning a coin toss.)	Cornelius Johnson	2.03 m	Melvin Walker	2.03 m	David Albritton	2.03 m
Pole vault	George Varoff	4.43 m	Earle Meadows	4.34 m	William Sefton	4.27 m
Long jump	Jesse Owens	8.00 m	Kermit King	7.75 m	Milton Green	7.56 m
Triple jump	Billy Brown	14.98 m	Rolland Romero	14.88 m	Dudley Wilkins	14.87 m
Shot put	Dimitri Zaitz	15.44 m	Jack Torrance	15.42 m	Gordon Dunn	15.33 m
Discus throw	Ken Carpenter	50.65 m	Gordon Dunn	50.63 m	Paul Halleck	48.12 m
Hammer throw	William Rowe	53.52 m	Irving Folwartshny	50.91 m	Henry Dreyer	50.67 m
Javelin throw	John Mottram	65.42 m	Horace O'Dell	63.81 m	Donald Johnson	58.68 m
Decathlon	Glenn Morris	7880 pts	Robert Clark	7598 pts	Jack Parker	7290 pts
200 m hurdles	James Hucker	23.8				
3000 m walk	Harry Hinkel	13:36.8				
Pentathlon	Arkie Trenko	2899 pts				
Weight throw for distance	Louis Lepis	10.69 m				

=== Women ===
Event	Gold		Silver		Bronze	
50 m	Ivy Wilson	6.7	Genevieve Brick		Marguerite Jones	
100 m	Helen Stephens	11.7	Annette Rogers	12.1 e	Harriet Bland	12.3 e
200 m	Beverly Hobbs	26.6	Cora Gaines		Marion Thompson	
80 m hurdles	Anne Vrana-O'Brien	12.0	Tidye Pickett		Simone Schaller	
High jump	Annette Rogers	1.59 m	Alice Arden	1.56 m	Kathlyn Kelly	1.53 m
Long jump	Mabel Smith	5.48 m	Etta Tate	5.31 m	Sylvia Broman	5.18 m
Shot put (8 lb)	Helen Stephens	12.71 m	Florence Wright	11.89 m	Catherine Fellmeth	11.26 m
Discus throw	Helen Stephens	37.04 m	Gertrude Wilhelmsen	35.58 m	Evelyn Ferrara	35.40 m
Javelin throw	Martha Worst	38.10 m	Betty Burch	36.46 m	Gertrude Wilhelmsen	36.35 m
Baseball throw	Josephine Lally	247 ft 3 in (75.36 m)				

== See also ==
- 1936 USA Indoor Track and Field Championships
- List of USA Outdoor Track and Field Championships winners (men)
- List of USA Outdoor Track and Field Championships winners (women)
