= Athletics at the 1936 Summer Olympics – Men's 400 metres =

Men's 400 metres at the Games of the XI Olympiad
- Venue: Olympiastadion: Berlin, Germany
- Dates: August 6, 1936 (heats and quarterfinals); August 7, 1936 (semifinals and final)
- Competitors: 42 from 25 nations
- Winning time: 46.5

Medalists
1st place, gold medalist(s)		Archie Williams; United States
2nd place, silver medalist(s)		Godfrey Brown; Great Britain
3rd place, bronze medalist(s)		James LuValle; United States

The men's 400 metres sprint event at the 1936 Olympic Games took place in early August. Forty-two athletes from 25 nations competed. The maximum number of athletes per nation had been set at 3 since the 1930 Olympic Congress. The final was won by 0.2 seconds by American Archie Williams, the third consecutive and seventh overall title in the event for the United States. Godfrey Brown's silver was Great Britain's first medal in the event since 1924.

== Background ==
This was the tenth appearance of the event, which is one of 12 athletics events to have been held at every Summer Olympics. None of the finalists from 1932 returned. Archie Williams of the United States was the favorite, setting the world record at 46.1 seconds at the 1936 NCAA championships.

The Republic of China and Romania appeared in the event for the first time. The United States made its tenth appearance in the event, the only nation to compete in it at every Olympic Games to that point.

== Competition format ==
The competition retained the basic four-round format from 1920. There were 8 heats in the first round, each with 5 or 6 athletes. The top three runners in each heat advanced to the quarterfinals. There were 4 quarterfinals of 6 runners each; the top three athletes in each quarterfinal heat advanced to the semifinals. The semifinals featured 2 heats of 6 runners each. The top three runners in each semifinal heat advanced, making a six-man final.

== Records ==
These were the standing world and Olympic records (in seconds) prior to the 1924 Summer Olympics.

World record	Archie Williams (USA)	46.1	Chicago, United States	19 June 1936
Olympic record	Bill Carr (USA)	46.2	Los Angeles, United States	5 August 1932

No records were set during this event.

== Schedule ==
Date	Time	Round
Thursday, 6 August 1936	10:30; 15:15	Heats; Quarterfinals
Friday, 7 August 1936	15:00; 17:30	Semifinals; Final

== Results ==
=== Heats ===
The fastest three runners in each of the eight heats advanced to the quarterfinal round.

==== Heat 1 ====
Rank	Athlete	Nation	Time	Notes
1	Bill Roberts	Great Britain	48.1	Q
2	Olle Danielsson	Sweden	48.6	Q
3	John Loaring	Canada	49.1	Q
4	Albert Jud	Switzerland	49.4	
5	Tibor Ribényi	Hungary	50.1	

==== Heat 2 ====
Rank	Athlete	Nation	Time	Notes
1	Georges Henry	France	49.2	Q
2	Karel Kněnický	Czechoslovakia	49.6	Q
3	Dennis Shore	South Africa	49.9	Q
4	Sven Strömberg	Sweden	50.0	
5	Johann Baptist Gudenus	Austria	52.9	

==== Heat 3 ====
Rank	Athlete	Nation	Time	Notes
1	Godfrey Brown	Great Britain	48.8	Q
2	Mario Lanzi	Italy	49.3	Q
3	Adolf Metzner	Germany	50.2	Q
4	Mohamed Ebeid	Egypt	50.5	
5	Jean Verhaert	Belgium	50.7	
6	Leonard Tay	Republic of China	52.4	

==== Heat 4 ====
Rank	Athlete	Nation	Time	Notes
1	Harold Smallwood	United States	49.0	Q
2	Marshall Limon	Canada	49.2	Q
3	József Vadas	Hungary	49.2	Q
4	Rolf Schønheyder	Norway	49.4	
5	Antônio de Carvalho	Brazil	50.4	
6	Hiroyoshi Kubota	Japan	50.8	

==== Heat 5 ====
Rank	Athlete	Nation	Time	Notes
1	Jimmy LuValle	United States	49.1	Q
2	Juan Carlos Anderson	Argentina	49.4	Q
3	Zoltán Zsitva	Hungary	49.8	Q
4	Francisc Nemeş	Romania	50.9	
5	Keiji Imai	Japan	51.0	

==== Heat 6 ====
Rank	Athlete	Nation	Time	Notes
1	Hermann Blazejezak	Germany	47.9	Q
2	Godfrey Rampling	Great Britain	48.6	Q
3	Börje Strandvall	Finland	49.3	Q
4	Raymond Boisset	France	49.5	
5	Jean Krombach	Luxembourg	50.4	

==== Heat 7 ====
Rank	Athlete	Nation	Time	Notes
1	Archie Williams	United States	47.8	Q
2	William Fritz	Canada	49.0	Q
3	Gunnar Christensen	Denmark	49.3	Q
4	Toyoyi Aihara	Japan	50.2	
5	Raúl Muñoz	Chile	50.5	

==== Heat 8 ====
Rank	Athlete	Nation	Time	Notes
1	Pierre Skawinski	France	48.9	Q
2	Bertil von Wachenfeldt	Sweden	49.0	Q
3	Rudolf Klupsch	Germany	49.1	Q
4	Alfred König	Austria	49.4	
5	Gyan Bhalla	India	52.4	

=== Quarterfinals ===
The fastest three runners in each of the four heats advanced to the semifinal round.

==== Quarterfinal 1 ====
Rank	Lane	Athlete	Nation	Time	Notes
1	5	Bill Roberts	Great Britain	47.7	Q
2	1	Harold Smallwood	United States	48.6	Q
3	3	Mario Lanzi	Italy	48.8	Q
4	2	Zoltán Zsitva	Hungary	49.4	
5	4	Dennis Shore	South Africa	49.6	
6	6	Gunnar Christensen	Denmark	51.0	

==== Quarterfinal 2 ====
Rank	Lane	Athlete	Nation	Time	Notes
1	2	Hermann Blazejezak	Germany	48.2	Q
2	5	Godfrey Brown	Great Britain	48.3	Q
3	6	William Fritz	Canada	48.4	Q
4	4	Bertil von Wachenfeldt	Sweden	48.5	
5	1	Georges Henry	France	49.4	
6	3	Börje Strandvall	Finland	49.9	

==== Quarterfinal 3 ====
Rank	Lane	Athlete	Nation	Time	Notes
1	1	Archie Williams	United States	48.0	Q
2	3	Juan Carlos Anderson	Argentina	48.7	Q
3	2	Johnny Loaring	Canada	49.3	Q
4	4	Olle Danielsson	Sweden	49.6	
—	—	Adolf Metzner	Germany	DNS	
—	—	József Vadas	Hungary	DNS	

==== Quarterfinal 4 ====
Rank	Lane	Athlete	Nation	Time	Notes
1	2	Jimmy LuValle	United States	47.6	Q
2	6	Pierre Skawinski	France	48.0	Q
3	3	Godfrey Rampling	Great Britain	48.0	Q
4	4	Rudolf Klupsch	Germany	48.8	
5	1	Marshall Limon	Canada	48.9	
6	5	Karel Kněnický	Czechoslovakia	49.6	

=== Semifinals ===
The fastest three runners in each of the two heats advanced to the final round.

==== Semifinal 1 ====
Rank	Lane	Athlete	Nation	Time	Notes
1	5	Archie Williams	United States	47.2	Q
2	2	Bill Roberts	Great Britain	48.0	Q
3	3	Johnny Loaring	Canada	48.1	Q
4	1	Mario Lanzi	Italy	48.2	
5	5	Pierre Skawinski	France	52.0	
—	—	Harold Smallwood	United States	DNS	

==== Semifinal 2 ====
Rank	Lane	Athlete	Nation	Time	Notes
1	4	Jimmy LuValle	United States	47.1	Q
2	5	Godfrey Brown	Great Britain	47.3	Q
3	6	William Fritz	Canada	47.4	Q
4	2	Godfrey Rampling	Great Britain	47.5	
5	3	Juan Carlos Anderson	Argentina	48.5	
6	1	Hermann Blazejezak	Germany	49.2	

=== Final ===
Rank	Lane	Athlete	Nation	Time
1st place, gold medalist(s)	5	Archie Williams	United States	46.5
2nd place, silver medalist(s)	6	Godfrey Brown	Great Britain	46.7
3rd place, bronze medalist(s)	2	James LuValle	United States	46.8
4	3	Bill Roberts	Great Britain	46.8
5	1	William Fritz	Canada	47.8
6	4	Johnny Loaring	Canada	48.2
