= John Terry (disambiguation) =

John Terry (born 1980) is an English retired footballer, currently the academy coach at Chelsea.

John Terry may also refer to:

- John Terry (actor) (born 1950), American actor
- John Terry (baseball) (1877–1958), Major League Baseball pitcher who played for the Detroit Tigers
- John Terry (cartoonist) (1880–1934), creator of comic strip Scorchy Smith
- John Terry (film financier) (1913–1995), founded the British Film School
- John Terry (miller) (1771–1844), early settler and pioneer farmer in New Norfolk, Tasmania
- John Terry (priest) (c. 1555–1625), Church of England clergyman
- John Terry (weightlifter) (1908–1970), American Olympic weightlifter
- John A. Terry (born 1933), American judge
- John B. Terry (1796–1874), American businessman, soldier, and territorial legislator
- John D. Terry (1845–1919), soldier and recipient of the Medal of Honor in the American Civil War
- John H. Terry (1924–2001), U.S. Representative from New York
- John R. Terry (born 1977), British mathematician
- John Terry (gridiron football) (born 1968), American football player
- John W. Terry, plaintiff in Terry v. Ohio U.S. Supreme Court case
- John Wesley Terry (1846–1???), Baptist preacher and labor leader
- Tarcat Terry (John Terry), Negro leagues baseball player

== See also ==
- Jack Terry (born 1930), Polish-American holocaust survivor
