= 1936 United States Olympic trials (track and field) =

1936 United States Olympic trials (track & field)
- Dates: July 11 – July 12 (men); July 4 (women)
- Host city: New York City (men); Providence, Rhode Island (women)
- Venue: Randall's Island Stadium (men); Brown Stadium (women)
- Level: Senior
- Type: Outdoor

The 1936 United States Olympic trials for track and field were held in July 1936 and decided the United States team for the 1936 Summer Olympics in Berlin. The trials for men and women were held separately; men's events were held at Randall's Island Stadium in New York City on July 11 and July 12, while women competed at Brown Stadium in Providence, Rhode Island on July 4. The top three athletes in each event qualified for the Olympic Games. The women's meeting also served as the annual outdoor track and field championships of the Amateur Athletic Union (AAU); the men's AAU championships were held separately a week before the Olympic trials.

Official world records were set in the men's meet by Cornelius Johnson and Dave Albritton in the high jump; Glenn Morris's winning score in the decathlon was also a world record, but not ratified. Harold Manning, winner of the 3000 meter steeplechase, set an unofficial world best. Jesse Owens won three events, equaling the world best for 200 meters around a curve.

The 1936 Olympic trials were marked by the emergence of African-American athletes, including Owens, Johnson and Albritton; as many black athletes qualified for the men's team in 1936 as at all previous Olympic trials combined. On the women's side, Tidye Pickett qualified in the 80-meter hurdles, becoming the first African-American woman to compete in the Olympics.

== Qualifying ==
As in previous years, athletes qualified for the men's Olympic trials by competing in preliminary meets; these included the 1936 NCAA championships and three regional semi-final tryout meets. At the final trials, the top three finishers in each event qualified for the Olympic team.

Some Olympic qualifying events were held separately from the trials proper; these included the decathlon, the 50 km race walk, the 10,000-meter run and the marathon. In the marathon the team was selected on the basis of two separate races.

== Men ==
The men's Olympic trials were held at the newly built Randall's Island Stadium in New York City on July 11 and July 12, in the middle of the record-breaking 1936 North American heat wave. Official world records were set by Cornelius Johnson and Dave Albritton in the high jump. Jesse Owens won three events, equaling the world best for 200 meters around a curve; he went on to win four gold medals at the Olympics. Despite the warm conditions not being conducive to distance running, Harold Manning set an unofficial world best in the 3000-meter steeplechase.

Two athletes – Frank Wykoff in the 100 meters and 4 × 100 meter relay, and Lee Bartlett in the javelin throw – qualified for their third consecutive Olympic Games. African-American athletes fared better than ever before, winning all events from 100 to 800 meters as well as the long jump and high jump; ten black athletes qualified for the men's team, equaling the total for all previous Olympic trials combined.

=== Track ===
Event	First		Second		Third	
100 meters	Jesse Owens	10.4	Ralph Metcalfe	10.6e	Frank Wykoff	10.7e
200 meters	Jesse Owens	21.0 =WB	Mack Robinson	21.2e	Bob Packard	21.3e
400 meters	Archie Williams	46.6	Harold Smallwood	46.7e	James LuValle	46.9e
800 meters	John Woodruff	1:51.0	Chuck Hornbostel	1:51.3	Harry Williamson	1:51.4
1500 meters	Glenn Cunningham	3:49.9	Archie San Romani	3:49.9	Gene Venzke	3:52.2
5000 meters	Don Lash; Louis Zamperini	15:04.2			Tom Deckard	12 yds bh
3000 meter steeplechase	Harold Manning	9:08.2 WB	Joe McCluskey	9:16.8	Glen Dawson	9:23.2
110 meter hurdles	Forrest Towns	14.3	Fritz Pollard	14.5e	Roy Staley	
400 meter hurdles	Glenn Hardin	51.4	Joe Patterson	51.6	Dale Schofield	51.7

Jesse Owens won both the 100 and 200 meters. In the 100 meters the favorites were Owens, Ralph Metcalfe and Eulace Peacock; Peacock had won the AAU championship in 1935 but missed much of 1936 due to injuries, and reinjured himself at the trials. Future star Ben Johnson was also injured and failed to finish in his heat. In Peacock's absence, Owens won by two yards with Metcalfe the runner-up; Frank Wykoff, who had only qualified for the final after a repechage, took third and qualified for his third consecutive Olympics.

For a long time, most American 200-meter and 220-yard races were run on straights; this had also been the case at previous Olympic trials. At the 1936 trials a turn was used; Owens's winning time, 21.0, equaled the world best for 200 meters with a turn. Mack Robinson, the older brother of Jackie Robinson, lost by only one yard. Robert Rodenkirchen, who had won in 21.0 (around a turn) at the Eastern Tryouts, was ruled ineligible for the final trials due to being a German citizen.

Archie Williams, who won the 400 meters at both the trials and the Olympics, was a relative newcomer; he had made his breakthrough earlier in 1936, running a new world record (46.1) at the NCAA championships. Smallwood and LuValle, who had both defeated Williams at the AAU championships a week before the trials, took the other Olympic spots. In the 800 meters, the fastest times were seen in the heats; John Woodruff won the first heat in 1:49.9, missing the metric world record by only one-tenth of a second. (Note: Tommy Hampson and Ben Eastman jointly held the 800-meter world record of 1:49.8. Eastman's time had been set over 880 yards (804.67 meters) in 1934; his unofficial 800-meter split in that race had been 1:49.1, but only his official finish time could be ratified as a world record.) The final was slower, with Woodruff winning in 1:51.0; returning Olympian Hornbostel was second, and Williamson narrowly overtook Abraham Rosenkrantz for third. Leading favorites Charles Beetham and Ben Eastman were both eliminated; Eastman, the world record holder and pre-Trials world leader, was ill before the race and placed sixth. Beetham, who had defeated Woodruff at the AAU championships, fell and lost his chances when Marmaduke Hobbs tripped in front of him; his appeal for a solo time-trial re-run was rejected by meeting officials.

Mile world record holder Glenn Cunningham won the 1500 meters in a close battle, edging NCAA champion San Romani by inches; Gene Venzke, who had missed out as the leading favorite at the 1932 trials, was a clear third. Bill Bonthron, holder of the world record (3:48.8), placed fourth and was eliminated. The 1500 meters was run as a straight final, as was the 3000-meter steeplechase; heats had been scheduled for both events but skipped at the request of the runners.

Don Lash and Louis Zamperini dead-heated in the 5000 meters; originally, Lash was ruled to be the sole winner, but after photo-finish review the result was changed to a tie. Lash (who had already qualified in the 10,000 meters) was the early leader, but slowed down to support his Indiana teammate Tom Deckard. When Deckard's place in the top three was clear, Lash resumed running his own race, battling with Zamperini for victory. In the 3000-meter steeplechase Harold Manning broke Volmari Iso-Hollo's world best of 9:09.4; second-time Olympians Joe McCluskey and Glen Dawson took the next spots. The warm weather, with temperatures of up to 100 °F (38 °C), was not conducive to fast distance running; Manning noted he had worked in even hotter conditions and could handle the heat. As the steeplechase did not become an official world record event until 1954, Manning's time was only ratified as a national record.

The 110 meter hurdles finalists had to wait for several minutes in the starting holes (blocks were not used) as the meeting had been running ahead of schedule. Consequently, they lost their best concentration. Forrest "Spec" Towns, the dominant hurdler of 1936, got a slow start but pulled away over the last hurdles; he went on to win gold at the Olympics. Sam Allen, who had been expected to qualify, ran with a broken toe and was eliminated. World record holder Glenn "Slats" Hardin was a heavy favorite in the 400 meter hurdles; he led the final from start to finish, but eventually only narrowly defeated Patterson and Schofield.

==== Relay selections ====
Eight men were named to the Olympic 4 × 100 meter relay pool: the top three from both 100 and 200 meters, as well as Foy Draper, Marty Glickman and Sam Stoller, who placed fourth to sixth in the 100 meters. The original 4 man team consisted of Draper, Glickman, Stoller, and Robinson. Robinson was replaced after he won a silver in the 200, giving the US an all-white team. It was expected that the four who would actually run at the Olympics would be Wykoff, Draper, Glickman and Stoller, and they trained for the relay together. Shortly before the Olympic heats, however, Glickman and Stoller were replaced with Owens and Metcalfe. Although the switch meant the top four from the trials ran on the Olympic relay, the late exclusion of Glickman and Stoller was controversial, especially given they had both been faster than Draper in practice runs after the trials. Accusations of anti-Semitism (Glickman and Stoller were both Jewish) and favoritism (Draper and Wykoff, who remained on the team, were both from the same university as assistant national team coach Dean Cromwell) resulted. Owens, Metcalfe, Draper and Wykoff won the Olympic relay in a new world record time (39.8) that was only broken twenty years later.

The 4 × 400 meter relay pool also consisted of eight men; the top seven from the individual 400 meters (Williams, Smallwood, LuValle, Al Fitch, Bob Young, Harold Cagle and Eddie O'Brien), as well as 800-meter champion John Woodruff. In this case, the four runners selected purely for the relay (Fitch, Young, Cagle and O'Brien) were used at the Olympics; they won silver behind the British team.

=== Field ===
Event	First		Second		Third	
High jump	Cornelius Johnson; Dave Albritton	6 ft 9 3/4 in (2.07 m) WR			Delos Thurber	6 ft 6 in (1.98 m)
Pole vault	Bill Graber; Earle Meadows; Bill Sefton	14 ft 3 in (4.34 m)				
Long jump	Jesse Owens	25 ft 10 3/4 in (7.89 m)	John Brooks	25 ft 3 3/8 in (7.70 m)	Bob Clark	25 ft 2 3/4 in (7.69 m)
Triple jump	Rolland Romero	49 ft 9 in (15.16 m)	Dudley Wilkins	49 ft 1 1/2 in (14.97 m)	Billy Brown	49 ft 1 in (14.96 m)
Shot put	Jack Torrance	51 ft 6 3/8 in (15.70 m)	Sam Francis	50 ft 4 in (15.34 m)	Dimitri Zaitz	50 ft 3 1/8 in (15.31 m)
Discus throw	Gordon Dunn	157 ft 7 1/2 in (48.05 m)	Ken Carpenter	156 ft 2 1/4 in (47.60 m)	Walter Wood	156 ft 0 in (47.54 m)
Hammer throw	Henry Dreyer	171 ft 11 1/2 in (52.41 m)	Bill Rowe	171 ft 9 1/2 in (52.36 m)	Don Favor	167 ft 6 in (51.05 m)
Javelin throw	Lee Bartlett	223 ft 3 1/4 in (68.05 m)	Malcolm Metcalf	215 ft 3 3/4 in (65.63 m)	Alton Terry	213 ft 11 in (65.20 m)

Corny Johnson and Dave Albritton provided one of the trials' top highlights in the high jump, tying for first place at the world record height of 6 ft 9 3/4 in (2.07 m). Both jumpers cleared the record height on their second attempts; Johnson broke the record first, with Albritton following shortly after. Behind the top two the level was surprisingly weak, with only Thurber clearing 6 ft 6 in (1.98 m). Walter Marty, who held the previous world record of 6 ft 9 1/8 in (2.06 m), was eliminated, as was indoor world record holder Ed Burke. At the Olympics the three Americans swept the medals; Johnson, who had placed fourth at the 1932 Games, won from Albritton and Thurber.

The world record holder was also left out of the team in the pole vault; George Varoff, who had won the AAU title with a record jump of 14 ft 6 1/2 in (4.43 m), only cleared 14 ft (4.26 m) at the trials and placed fourth. For the first time in the history of the Olympic trials, all qualifiers in an event came from the same university; Earle Meadows (who won in Berlin) and Bill Sefton were students at the University of Southern California, while returning Olympian Bill Graber was a USC graduate.

Owens won easily in the long jump, only taking two attempts; he was the only athlete to qualify in three events. Bob Clark, who also qualified in the decathlon, considered giving his place on the long jump squad to fourth-placer Kermit King; team officials, however, disallowed that. In the triple jump all of the top three came from Louisiana; AAU champion Brown, a 17-year-old high schooler, was the youngest athlete to qualify for the men's team.

World record holder Jack Torrance had been the world's leading shot putter since 1933 and was considered an almost certain Olympic champion at his peak. By 1936 he had lost his best shape; he was overweight and no longer trained as hard as during his peak years. While still a top contender, he only placed fifth in Berlin, with Francis in fourth being the best American. Gordon "Slinger" Dunn – who only missed qualifying in the shot by two inches – won the discus throw ahead of AAU champion Ken Carpenter, though neither of them was at their best. Defending Olympic champion John Anderson had made a strong comeback in 1936, but was ill before the final trials and went out in the qualifying. Carpenter and Dunn were also the top two at the Olympics.

Henry Dreyer, the 1935 AAU champion, narrowly defeated 1936 AAU champion Bill Rowe in the hammer throw; both Dreyer and Rowe had been coached by former Olympic champion Fred Tootell at Rhode Island State College. Javelin champion Lee Bartlett qualified for his third consecutive Olympic Games, while runner-up Metcalf made the team for the second time; Terry, who had won the NCAA championship with an American record throw of 226 ft 2 3/4 in (68.95 m), was the only new Olympian on the team.

=== Other qualifying events ===
Event	Location	First		Second		Third	
10,000 meters	Princeton, New Jersey; July 3	Don Lash	31:06.9 AR	Eino Pentti		Stan Wudyka	
Decathlon	Milwaukee, Wisconsin; June 26–27	Glenn Morris	7875 WR	Bob Clark	7595	Jack Parker	7281
Marathon	Boston, Massachusetts; April 20	Ellison Brown	2:33:40.8	William McMahon	2:35:27.6	Mel Porter	2:36:48
	Washington, D.C. May 30	William McMahon	2:38:14.2	John A. Kelley	2:40:07	Mel Porter	2:43:49
50 km walk	Cincinnati, Ohio; May 24	Ernest Crosbie	5:16:16	Albert Mangan	5:18:55	Ernest Koehler	5:19:50

In the 10,000 meters, Olympic selections were based on the AAU championship race in Princeton. Don Lash, who also won the 5000 meters, broke the American record; he was one of only three men to qualify in more than one individual event, the others being Owens and Bob Clark.

Decathlon qualifying was held in Milwaukee as part of the Central Tryouts. Glenn Morris, a newcomer who had completed his first decathlon only two months before the trials, won with a world record tally of 7875 points; he was good in all events and had no weak points. Bob Clark broke the long jump decathlon best with a jump of 25 ft 11 1/2 in (7.91 m), but was not as strong as Morris in the hurdles and throws. Morris's world record was superseded by his Olympic winning score of 7900 points and never ratified; the Americans swept the medals at the Olympics.

Marathon selections were based on two races, the Boston Marathon and the AAU championship marathon in Washington. Ellison "Tarzan" Brown, a Narragansett Indian, won the Boston Marathon; he went out extremely fast and won by almost two minutes despite slowing to a walk at several points late in the race. McMahon, the Boston runner-up, won the AAU championship in a course record time; Kelley, fifth in Boston and second in the AAU race, received the third Olympic spot. Early favorites to qualify had included Boston course record holder Les Pawson and defending AAU champion Pat Dengis; both of them dropped out in Boston, and Dengis faded from the lead to eighth in Washington, suffering from medical problems.

In the 50-kilometer race walk, the AAU championship race in Cincinnati doubled as the Olympic qualifying event. Returning Olympian Ernie Crosbie started slow and only took the lead near the finish; newcomer Mangan was second, and Koehler defeated John Deni by one second for the final place on the team. The times were relatively slow due to the warm weather.

== Women ==
The women's Olympic trials were held at Brown Stadium in Providence, Rhode Island on July 4 as part of Providence's tercentenary festivities. Unlike the men's meet, the women's trials doubled as the annual AAU national outdoor championships. 18-year-old Helen Stephens was the star of the meet, winning the 100 meters, the discus throw and the shot put. Annette Rogers and Gertrude Wilhelmsen also qualified in two events. Tidye Pickett, who made the team in the 80-meter hurdles, became the first African-American woman to compete in the Olympic Games.

Event	First		Second		Third	
100 meters	Helen Stephens	11.7	Annette Rogers	12.1e	Harriet Bland	12.3e
80 meter hurdles	Anne O'Brien	12.0	Tidye Pickett		Simone Schaller	
High jump	Annette Rogers	5 ft 2 1/2 in (1.59 m)	Alice Arden	5 ft 1 1/2 in (1.56 m)	Kathlyn Kelley	5 ft 1/2 in (1.54 m)
Discus throw	Helen Stephens	121 ft 6 1/2 in (37.05 m)	Gertrude Wilhelmsen	116 ft 9 in (35.59 m)	Evelyn Ferrara	116 ft 1 3/4 in (35.40 m)
Javelin throw	Martha Worst	125 ft 1/4 in (38.10 m)	Betty Burch	119 ft 7 1/2 in (36.46 m)	Gertrude Wilhelmsen	119 ft 3 in (36.35 m)

"Fulton Flash" Helen Stephens dominated the 100 meters, winning easily in the heats, semi-finals and final. Her winning time, 11.7, broke Stanisława Walasiewicz's listed world record of 11.8 by one-tenth of a second but was inferior to still-pending records by Walasiewicz (also known as Stella Walsh) and Stephens herself. Betty Robinson, the 1928 Olympic champion, was attempting a comeback and placed fifth; she was named to the Olympic team in the relay, winning gold with Stephens, Rogers and Bland.

In the 80-meter hurdles the fastest time was Simone Schaller's 11.8 in the semi-finals; in the final she only placed third as Anne O'Brien won in 12.0. Both Schaller and O'Brien qualified for their second Olympics; O'Brien had first made the team in 1928. In 1932 she entered the trials as the national leader, but fell in the heats. Tidye Pickett, who placed second between them, had been sixth in the 100 meters at the 1932 trials; in Berlin she became the first African-American woman to compete in the Olympic Games. (Note: Two African-Americans (Pickett and Louise Stokes) had been named to the 1932 Olympic team as part of the 4 × 100 meter relay pool, but both of them were left out of the final four-woman lineup.)

100-meter runner-up Annette Rogers won the high jump, the only returning Olympian in that event. There was a tie for third place, with both Kathlyn Kelley and Ida Myers clearing 5 ft 1/2 in (1.54 m); Kelley won the jump-off for the final Olympic spot.

Helen Stephens scored her second victory in the discus throw, winning by almost five feet; Stephens also won the 8 lb (3.63 kg) shot put, which was part of the AAU championship program but not an Olympic qualifying event. Meeting rules limited her participation to only three events, preventing her from scoring even more points; she was the defending champion in the AAU 200-meter dash, but not allowed to defend her title. The javelin competition was close but low-level; none of the Americans made an impact in Berlin. 1932 Olympian and former world record holder Nan Gindele missed making the team by a foot.
