= Athletics at the 1936 Summer Olympics – Women's javelin throw =

Women's javelin throw at the Games of the XI Olympiad
- Dates: August 2, 1936

Medalists
1st place, gold medalist(s)		Tilly Fleischer; Germany
2nd place, silver medalist(s)		Luise Krüger; Germany
3rd place, bronze medalist(s)		Maria Kwaśniewska; Poland

The women's javelin throw event was part of the track and field athletics programme at the 1936 Summer Olympics. The competition was held on August 2, 1936. The final was won by Tilly Fleischer of Germany.

== Results ==
=== Final standings ===
Rank	Name	Nationality	Distance	Notes
1st place, gold medalist(s)	Tilly Fleischer	Germany	45.18	OR
2nd place, silver medalist(s)	Luise Krüger	Germany	43.29	
3rd place, bronze medalist(s)	Maria Kwaśniewska	Poland	41.80	
4	Herma Bauma	Austria	41.66	
5	Sadako Yamamoto	Japan	41.45	
6	Lydia Eberhardt	Germany	41.37	
7	Gertrude Wilhelmsen	United States	37.35	
8	Gien de Kock	Netherlands	36.93	
9	Martha Worst	United States	36.69	
10	Irja Lipasti	Finland	33.69	
11	Jeanne Van Kesteren	Belgium	33.13	
12	Jelica Stanojević	Yugoslavia	29.88	
13	Betty Burch	United States	28.84	
14	Katharine Connal	Great Britain	27.80	

Key: OR = Olympic record
