= Godfrey Brown (athlete) =

British sprinter (1915–1995)

Personal information
- Born: 21 February 1915 Bankura, Bengal, India
- Died: 4 February 1995 (aged 79) Sussex, England

Sport
- Sport: Athletics
- Event: 400 m/440 y/880 y
- Club: University of Cambridge AC; Achilles Club; Birchfield Harriers
Medal record
Men's athletics
Representing Great Britain
Olympic Games
Gold medal – first place	1936 Berlin	4×400 m
Silver medal – second place	1936 Berlin	400 m
European Championships
Gold medal – first place	1938 Paris	400 m
Silver medal – second place	1938 Paris	4×400 m
Bronze medal – third place	1938 Paris	4×100 m

Arthur Godfrey Kilner Brown (21 February 1915 – 4 February 1995) was a British athlete, winner of a gold medal in the 4 × 400 m relay at the 1936 Summer Olympics. He later became Headmaster of the Worcester Royal Grammar School now Royal Grammar School Worcester, a post which he held from 1950 until his retirement in 1978.

== Biography ==
Born in Bankura, Bengal, India, Brown was educated at Warwick School, where he was Head Boy from 1933 to 1934. In 1935 he went up to study English and History at Peterhouse, Cambridge, and worked after graduation as a history master at Bedford School. Because his sight was poor he was not mobilized in the Army, staying as school master at Cheltenham College from 1943 to 1950. From 1950 till 1978, Brown was the headmaster of the Royal Grammar School Worcester. He died in Sussex, aged 79.

Brown was a highly talented runner at distances from 100 yd (91 m) to the half-mile. He won the British AAA championships in 440 yd (400 m) in 1936 and 1938 and in 880 yd (800 m) in 1939.

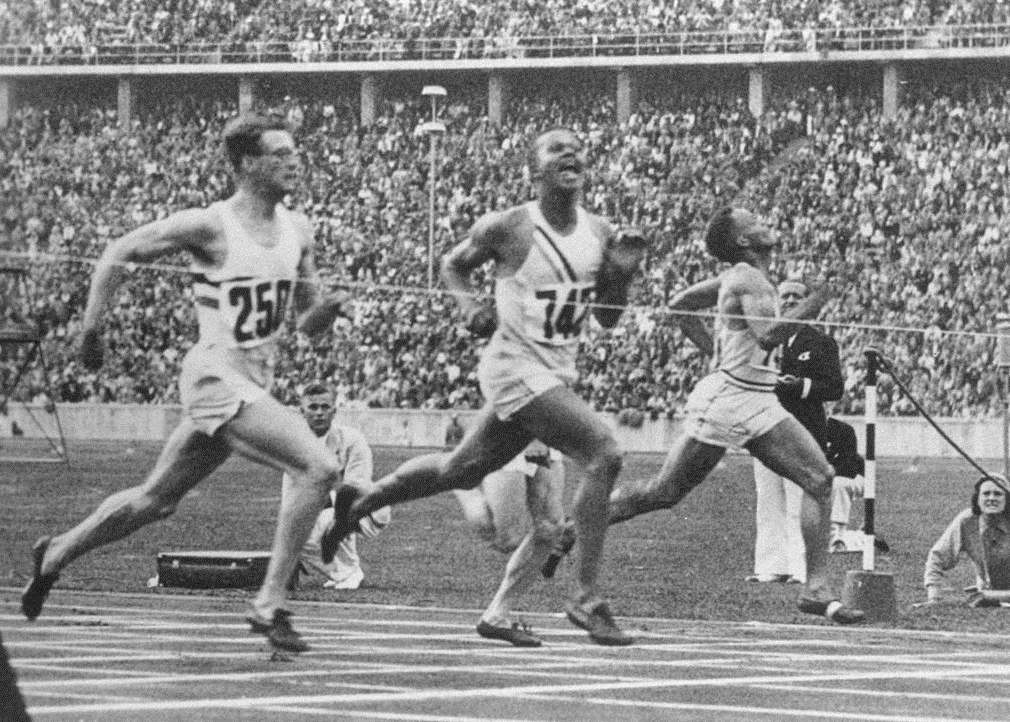
Brown (left), Archie Williams and James LuValle during the 400 metres event at the 1936 Summer Olympics.

At the Berlin Olympics, Brown was narrowly beaten by Archie Williams in the 400 m individual event, but Brown anchored the British 4 × 400 m relay team to a gold medal ahead of the United States.

In 1937, Brown won 400 m at the World Student Games, with additional gold medals at both relays.

At the 1938 European Championships, Brown won the individual 400 m, anchored the British 4 × 400 m relay team to a second place and won the bronze at 4 × 100 m relay.

Brown won three AAA Championships titles; two 440 yards titles at the 1936 AAA Championships and 1938 AAA Championships and one 880 yards title at the 1939 AAA Championships.

== Siblings ==
His sister Audrey and brother Ralph were also notable athletes, Audrey winning a silver in 4 × 100 m relay at the 1936 Olympics and Ralph won the British AAA championships title in 440 yd (400 m) hurdles in 1934.

Records
Preceded by (United Kingdom) Eric Liddell	European record holder men's 400 m 7 August 1936 – 11 August 1939	Succeeded by (West Germany) Rudolf Harbig
