= Louise Stokes =

American track and field athlete

- Stokes in 1931

Personal information
- Full name: Louise Mae Stokes Fraser
- Born: Malden, Massachusetts

Sport
- Sport: Track and field

Louise Mae Stokes Fraser (October 27, 1913 – March 25, 1978) was an American track and field athlete. In 1933, she was the first African-American woman to win an event in the USA Outdoor Track and Field Championships, winning the 50-meter dash, and becoming a national champion.

== Biography ==
The oldest of six children, Louise Mae Stokes was born in Malden, Massachusetts on October 27, 1913, to William, a gardener, and Mary Wesley Stokes, a domestic. She started running while a student at Beebe Junior High, where she was a center for the basketball team. In 1930, one of her basketball teammates, Kathryn Robley, impressed by her speed, suggested Stokes to join her in the Onteora Track Club, whose sponsor, Malden park commissioner William H. Quaine, knew of Stokes' reputation. Soon, Stokes started winning the sprints and jumping events.

While a junior in Malden High School in 1931, Stokes won the James Michael Curley Cup for the best women's performance at the Mayor's Day track meet, including a New England record 12.6 seconds in the 100-meter dash. In December of that year, she tied the world record for women's standing broad jump at 8 feet 5 3/4 inches. At the 1932 United States Olympic Trials, she competed in the 100 meters where she placed fourth, earning her a spot in the 4 × 100 meter relay pool and making her and Tidye Pickett the first African-American Women to be selected for the Olympics, although coach George Vreeland left them out at the final relay lineup. In Los Angeles, Stokes was given a compact by film star Janet Gaynor.

Stokes continued running, and at the 1936 United States Olympic Trials, she again competed in the 100 meters, winning both her heat and her semi-final. She was leading the final until a costly error pushed her back to fifth. Still, it was good enough for her to become a part of the 4 x 100 meter relay pool. Stokes' hometown of Malden raised $680 in order that she may compete in Berlin. Although she did not compete at the Olympics, she was still given a hero's welcome in Malden. In 2016, the 1936 Olympic journey of the eighteen Black American athletes, including interviews with Stokes' family, was documented in the film Olympic Pride, American Prejudice.

Stokes was considering to compete at the 1940 Olympics before its cancellation due to World War II. In 1941, she founded the Colored Women's Bowling League, and for the next three decades won many awards. In 1944, she married Caribbean cricketer Wilfred Fraser and had a son, Wilfred Jr., as well as a stepdaughter, Shirley. From 1957 to 1975, she worked as a clerk for the Massachusetts Department of Corporations and Taxation. She died on March 25, 1978.

Malden, Massachusetts have honored her with a fieldhouse with her name in Roosevelt Park, and a statue in the Malden High Courtyard.
