= Paul Halleck =

American football player (1913–1974)

No. 16
- Position: End

Personal information
- Born: July 11, 1913; Youngstown, Ohio, U.S.
- Died: March 24, 1974 (aged 60); Fairfax County, Virginia, U.S.
- Listed height: 6 ft 0 in (1.83 m)
- Listed weight: 195 lb (88 kg)

Career information
- High school: Wayne (Williamsfield, Ohio)
- College: Ohio
- NFL draft: 1937: undrafted

Career history
- Cleveland Rams (1937); Richmond Arrows (1938–1939); Roanoke Travelers (1941)
- Stats at Pro Football Reference

Paul Charles Halleck (July 11, 1913 – March 23, 1974) was an American professional football end who played one season with the Cleveland Rams of the National Football League (NFL). He played college football at Ohio University.

== Early life ==
Paul Charles Halleck was born on July 11, 1913, in Youngstown, Ohio. He attended Wayne Township High School in Williamsfield, Ohio.

== College career ==
Halleck played college football for the Ohio Bobcats of Ohio University. He earned All-Ohio honors in both 1935 and 1936. He also participated in track and field for the Bobcats. Halleck placed 3rd at the 1936 USA Outdoor Track and Field Championships in the discus. He finished 4th at the Olympic trials, one spot away from making the U.S. team at the 1936 Olympics. He was also a shot putter in college. Halleck graduated from Ohio in 1936. He was inducted into the school's athletics hall of fame in 1979.

== Professional career ==
Halleck went undrafted in the 1937 NFL draft. He played in all 11 games, starting two, for the Rams during the team's inaugural 1937 season, and caught three passes for 57 yards.

Halleck played in, and started, one game for the Richmond Arrows of the Dixie League in 1938. He appeared in six games, all starts, for the Arrows during the 1939 season, scoring one rushing touchdown and four extra points.

Halleck played in two games for the Roanoke Travelers of the Dixie League in 1941.

== Personal life ==
Halleck served in the United States Army. He died on March 23, 1974, in Fairfax County, Virginia.
