= Van Kesteren =

Van Kesteren is a Dutch toponymic surname meaning "from Kesteren"", Gelderland. Notable people with the surname include:

- Anne van Kesteren (born 1986), Dutch web standards expert
- Dave Van Kesteren (born 1955), Canadian Conservative politician
- Hans van Kesteren (1908–1998), Dutch football defender
- Jeanne Van Kesteren (1907–?), Belgian javelin thrower
- John van Kesteren (1921–2008), Dutch opera singer
- Ton van Kesteren (born 1954), Dutch PVV politician
