= Mohamed Ebeid =

Egyptian sprinter

Personal information
- Nationality: Egyptian
- Born: 11 April 1911

Sport
- Sport: Sprinting
- Event: 400 metres

Mohamed Ebeid (born 11 April 1911) was an Egyptian sprinter. He competed in the men's 400 metres at the 1936 Summer Olympics.
