= Keiji Imai =

Japanese sprinter (1917–1994)

Personal information
- Nationality: Japanese
- Born: 5 September 1917
- Died: 11 October 1994 (aged 77)

Sport
- Sport: Sprinting
- Event: 400 metres

Keiji Imai (今井 慶二, Imai Keiji; 5 September 1917 – 11 October 1994) was a Japanese sprinter. He competed in the men's 400 metres at the 1936 Summer Olympics.
