= Marshall Limon =

Canadian sprinter

Personal information
- Nationality: Canadian
- Born: 27 August 1915 Vancouver, British Columbia, Canada
- Died: 19 March 1965 (aged 49) North Vancouver, British Columbia, Canada

Sport
- Sport: Sprinting
- Event: 400 metres

Marshall Limon (27 August 1915 – 19 March 1965) was a Canadian sprinter. He competed in the men's 400 metres at the 1936 Summer Olympics.

== See also ==
=== Archives ===
There is a Marshall N. Limon fonds at Library and Archives Canada. The archival reference number is R16638.
