= Sadako Yamamoto =

Japanese javelin thrower (born 1915)

Personal information
- Nationality: Japanese
- Born: 14 July 1915

Sport
- Sport: Athletics
- Event: Javelin throw

Sadako Yamamoto (山本 定子, Yamamoto Sadako; born 14 July 1915, date of death unknown) was a Japanese track and field athlete. She competed in the women's javelin throw at the 1936 Summer Olympics.
