= Stockton Wood and Down =

Protected area in Wiltshire, England

Coordinates: 51.1287°N 2.0614°W

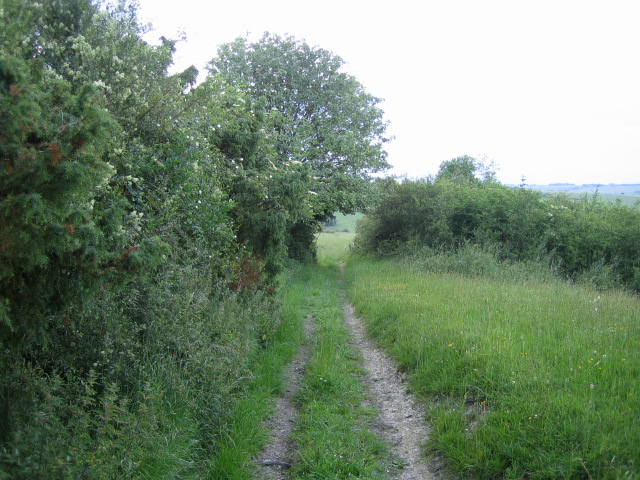
A byway on Stockton Down

Stockton Wood and Down (grid reference ST958366) is a 61.5 hectare biological Site of Special Scientific Interest in the southwest of Stockton parish in Wiltshire, England, notified in 1951.

== Sources ==
- Natural England citation sheet for the site (accessed 25 May 2023)
