= Olympic Pride, American Prejudice =

2016 documentary film

- Directed by: Deborah Riley Draper
- Produced by: Dr. Amy Tiemann; Michael A. Draper; Blair Underwood
- Cinematography: Jonathan Hall
- Edited by: Pascal Akesson; Sandra Christie
- Music by: Cheryl Rogers
- Production company: Coffee Bluff Pictures
- Release date: June 2016 (LA Film Festival)
- Running time: 82 minutes
- Country: United States
- Language: English

Olympic Pride, American Prejudice is a 2016 American documentary film written and directed by Deborah Riley Draper. Amy Tiemann, Michael A. Draper, and Blair Underwood (who also narrated the film) were executive producers. The film premiered at the LA Film Festival in 2016.

== Synopsis ==
While the story of Jesse Owens is well-documented, the film focuses instead on the 17 Black athletes from the United States other than Jesse Owens who participated in the 1936 Olympic Games in Berlin, Germany. Most of these other athletes did not receive major news coverage at the time, particularly before the games; and most are still relatively unknown. None of the eighteen athletes were alive at the time of the movie's production, so Draper used interviews with families, audio footage from historical interviews, and newsreels and newspaper coverage to tell the athletes' stories.

The film contrasts the status of Black Americans at that moment in history—when personal and institutional racism kept Black Americans from having equal rights—with Hitler's and the Nazi Party's rise to power along with the upswing in antisemitism in Germany. Draper includes interviews with sources in Germany, as well as Gretel Bergmann, a Jewish German athlete who had been living in the United Kingdom. Bergmann had been ordered to return to Germany as "a propaganda tool" to make the German Olympic team selection appear unbiased; she was ultimately not allowed to compete. Against the background of rising White Nationalism in Germany, the United States was conflicted about whether American Jewish and Black athletes should even go to the Games at all. United States Olympic Association president Avery Brundage was against a boycott, Fiorello La Guardia and the N.A.A.C.P. supported it, while the African American press felt the athletes should participate to "disprove the myth of white supremacy."

The movie also specifically highlights the achievements of the two Black women on the team—Louise Stokes and Tidye Pickett—who had to manage hazing and injuries as well as the usual stresses of international travel and American racism.

The Black members of the U.S. team won a total of fourteen medals—eight gold, four silver and two bronze—half of the Olympic points for the entire American team. When they returned to the US, there were still few job opportunities for them, and President Roosevelt refused to shake the hands of the returning medal-winners out of concern for alienating Southern voters. While things did not always work out for most of the 1936 Black Olympic athletes, many of the modern day people interviewed felt that their actions laid the groundwork for future civil rights victories.

== Reception ==
On review aggregator Rotten Tomatoes, the film holds an approval rating of 100% based on eight reviews. Metacritic, which uses a weighted average, assigned the film a score of 73 out of 100.

Following the release of the movie, the families of the eighteen athletes were honored at a Team USA event in Washington DC in 2016 and were invited to the White House—an honor the White athletes received in 1936 that their Black colleagues did not.

== 1936 Black Olympic athletes ==
- Dave Albritton
- John Brooks
- James Clark
- Cornelius Johnson
- Willis Johnson
- Howell King
- Jimmy LuValle
- Ralph Metcalfe
- Art Oliver
- Jesse Owens
- Tidye Pickett
- Fritz Pollard, Jr.
- Mack Robinson
- Louise Stokes
- John Terry
- Archie Williams
- Jack Wilson
- John Woodruff

== See also ==
- 2016 in film
