= Lydia Eberhardt =

German javelin thrower

Personal information
- Nationality: German
- Born: 7 February 1913 Eislingen, German Empire
- Died: 21 September 1997 (aged 84) Geislingen, Germany

Sport
- Sport: Athletics
- Event: Javelin throw

Lydia Eberhardt (7 February 1913 – 21 September 1997) was a German athlete. She competed in the women's javelin throw at the 1936 Summer Olympics.
