= Toyoji Aihara =

Japanese sprinter (born 1914)

Personal information
- Nationality: Japanese
- Born: 7 January 1914

Sport
- Sport: Sprinting
- Event: 400 metres

Toyoji Aihara (相原 豊次, Aihara Toyoji; born 7 January 1914, date of death unknown) was a Japanese sprinter at the 1936 Summer Olympics.

Aihara competed at the Olympics at the same time he was attending Chuo University in Tokyo. He joined the postal service after graduating.

Aihara competed in the men's 400 metres and the men's 4 x 400 metres relay events at the 1936 Summer Olympics. He competed in the Hakone Ekiden relay race in 1937 and won the 400 metre and the 400 metre hurdles events at the 1937 Japan Athletics Championships.
