= Jean Krombach =

Luxembourgish sprinter

Personal information
- Nationality: Luxembourgish
- Born: 17 July 1910 Luxembourg City, Luxembourg
- Died: 4 January 1999 (aged 88)

Sport
- Sport: Sprinting
- Event: 400 metres

Jean Krombach (17 July 1910 – 4 January 1999) was a Luxembourgish sprinter. He competed in the men's 400 metres at the 1936 Summer Olympics.
