= Georges Henry =

French sprinter

Personal information
- Nationality: French
- Born: 25 October 1907
- Died: 31 May 1981 (aged 73)

Sport
- Sport: Sprinting
- Event: 400 metres

Georges Henry (25 October 1907 – 31 May 1981) was a French sprinter. He competed in the men's 400 metres at the 1936 Summer Olympics.
