= Antônio de Carvalho =

Brazilian sprinter

Personal information
- Full name: Antônio Damaso de Carvalho
- Born: 12 August 1913 Rio de Janeiro, Brazil
- Died: 18 November 2007 (aged 94)

Sport
- Sport: Sprinting
- Event: 400 metres

Antônio Damaso de Carvalho (12 August 1913 – 18 November 2007) was a Brazilian sprinter. He competed in the men's 400 metres at the 1936 Summer Olympics.
