= John Brooks (athlete) =

American long jumper

John William Brooks (July 31, 1910 – October 9, 1990) was an American long jumper. He competed in the 1936 Summer Olympics in Berlin, placing seventh in the long jump.

== Career ==
Representing the University of Chicago, Brooks placed second behind Lambert Redd at the 1932 NCAA championships with a season-best jump of 25 ft 2 3/4 in (7.69 m). He placed fourth with a leap of 24 ft 10 5/8 in (7.58 m) at the 1932 United States Olympic Trials, missing qualifying for the 1932 Summer Olympics by one place. Brooks won the NCAA championship in 1933, his senior year; he placed second behind Jesse Owens at the Amateur Athletic Union (AAU)'s national outdoor championships that year. He placed third at the AAU meet in 1934 and 1935; he set his lifetime best, 25 ft 5 1/2 in (7.76 m), at the 1935 championships.

At the 1936 Olympic Trials Brooks placed second behind Owens with a jump of 25 ft 3 3/8 in (7.70 m), making the American team for the Olympic Games in Berlin. He placed seventh in the Olympic final, reaching a wind-aided 7.41 m (24 ft 3 3/4 in) on his best attempt. Brooks took second at the AAU meet in 1937, his final podium appearance.

In addition to his own career, Brooks had a role in coaching Tidye Pickett, the first African-American woman to compete in the Olympic Games. In 2016, the 1936 Olympic journey of the eighteen Black American athletes, including Brooks and Pickett, was documented in the film Olympic Pride, American Prejudice.
