= Jelica Stanojević =

Serbian athlete

Personal information
- Nationality: Serbian
- Born: 1 July 1913 Budapest, Austria-Hungary

Sport
- Sport: Athletics
- Event: Javelin throw

Jelica Stanojević (1 July 1913 – 26 February 1998) was a Serbian athlete. She competed in the women's javelin throw at the 1936 Summer Olympics, representing Yugoslavia. She was the first woman to represent Yugoslavia at the Olympics.
