= Olle Danielsson =

Swedish sprinter

Personal information
- Nationality: Swedish
- Born: 20 April 1912
- Died: 12 October 1999 (aged 87)

Sport
- Sport: Sprinting
- Event: 400 metres

Olle Danielsson (20 April 1912 – 12 October 1999) was a Swedish sprinter. He competed in the men's 400 metres at the 1936 Summer Olympics.
