= Zoltán Zsitva =

Hungarian sprinter (1905–1996)

Zoltán Viktor Sándor Zsitva
Personal information
- Nationality: Hungarian
- Born: 26 August 1905 Nyíregyháza, Austria-Hungary
- Died: 1 April 1996 (aged 90) Budapest, Hungary

Sport
- Sport: Sprinting
- Event: 400 metres

Zoltán Zsitva (26 August 1905 – 1 April 1996) was a Hungarian sprinter. He competed in the men's 400 metres at the 1936 Summer Olympics.
