= Harold Smallwood =

American sprinter

Robert Harold "Hal" Smallwood (March 24, 1915 – April 20, 1985) was an American sprinter. He was national champion in the 400 meters in 1936 and competed at the 1936 Summer Olympics, but withdrew after the quarterfinals due to appendicitis.

== Biography ==
Smallwood was born in San Luis Obispo, California on March 24, 1915. He studied at Ventura High School and then Ventura Junior College, where he took up track and field. From 1935 he attended the University of Southern California (USC); at the time, the USC Trojans had a very strong track team under coach Dean Cromwell. Smallwood placed third in the 400 meters at the 1936 NCAA Championships; the Trojans won the team championship with a record 103 1/3 points.

Smallwood won the national (AAU) championship later that summer, defeating Jimmy LuValle and world record holder Archie Williams in a close race in 47.3. At the U.S. Olympic Trials a week after the AAU meet he placed second behind Williams, running an estimated 46.7; he qualified for the Summer Olympics in Berlin.

En route to the Olympics Smallwood suffered an attack of appendicitis, which put his participation in the Games in doubt. Eventually, he was able to run in the heats and the quarter-finals, advancing from both; he had to withdraw before the semi-finals as his condition worsened. He underwent an emergency appendectomy in Berlin, but remained in weak health; complications, including pleurisy, nearly killed him in February 1937.

Smallwood eventually recovered, and was named co-captain of the USC track team for the 1937–38 season. He died in Oxnard, California in April 1985.
