= Leonard Tay =

Chinese sprinter (1912–1980)

Personal information
- Nationality: Chinese
- Born: 25 November 1912

Sport
- Sport: Sprinting
- Event: 400 metres

Leonard Tay 戴淑國 (born 25 November 1912, date of death 15 May 1980) was a Chinese sprinter. He competed in the men's 400 metres at the 1936 Summer Olympics.
