= Milton Green =

American hurdler

Milton G. Green (October 31, 1913 – March 30, 2005) was a Jewish American track and field athlete who was a world record holder in high hurdles during the 1930s.

Milton Green

== Track career ==
A native of Lowell, Massachusetts, Green was a standout in track at Brookline High School. After preparing for college at Phillips Exeter Academy, Green attended Cornell University for one year, but did not participate in athletics. He then transferred to Harvard College, but was ineligible to compete during his sophomore year.

On March 17, 1934, Green tied the world record for 60-Meter high hurdles of 7.4 seconds at the Knights of Columbus Games at Madison Square Garden. On October 5, 1934, he won the 100-meter dash and 110-meter high hurdle, and broad jump events at a meet pitting American and Italian athletes at Harvard Stadium. At the 1935 William C. Prout Memorial Games, Green tied a world record by finishing the 45-yard high hurdles in 5.8 seconds. At the 1935 triangular track games between Harvard, Cornell, and Dartmouth College at the Boston Garden, he broke the meet record in the 45-Yard High Hurdles.

Green was named captain of the Harvard track team for the 1935–36 season. He represented the school at the Harvard–Yale–Oxford–Cambridge meet at London's White City Stadium and won the broad jump and 220-yard low hurdles. In 1936, the annual triangular track meet at Boston Garden was expanded to include Yale. Green won three events (50-yard dash, running broad jump, and 45-yard high hurdles) at the inaugural quadrangular meet. He won the 50-meter hurdles at the 1936 IC4A indoor championship at Madison Square Garden, but Harvard finished the standings behind Manhattan College and Yale. That same month, he competed in the annual track meet at the Maple Leaf Gardens, but lost in the broad jump to Canadian Sam Richardson. At the 1936 Heptagonal Games, Green won three events, the 110-meter high hurdles, 200-meter low hurdles, and the broad jump, and set the meet record in the later two. At that year's Harvard-Yale meet, he won the 100-meter high hurdles, 200-meter low hurdles, and broad jump. He suffered a leg injury prior to the 1936 IC4A outdoor championships at Franklin Field and finished second behind John Donovan (son of Patsy Donovan) in the high hurdles. His injury forced him to withdraw from a meet at Princeton University the following month. At the 1936 USA Outdoor Track and Field Championships, he finished third in the long jump behind Jesse Owens and Kermit King.

Green was considered a leading contender to make the Olympic team in 1936. He and his Harvard teammate Norman Cahners chose to protest the event being held in Nazi Germany on the advice of Rabbi Harry Levy of Temple Israel in Boston. However, their boycott was not publicized at the time. According to Green, "Both Cahners and I decided that we would boycott the Olympics. We just felt it was the right thing to do. I spoke to the track coach at Harvard. We told him about our intention. He tried to persuade us not to do it. He said he didn't think it would do much good, and we should try to go to the final tryouts and try to make the team. But we didn't want to do that. After we boycotted the Olympics, no one came to speak to us or ask us if we'd make any statements about it. And I don't think anyone knew particularly that we did boycott it. I think back on making that decision and whether I would have won silver or gold or some sort of a medal, and every time I go to the Olympics—I've been to three of them—I particularly watch the high hurdles and the long jump, and I picture myself as maybe having won a medal in it."

Green was inducted into the Harvard Athletic Hall of Fame in 1970 and the International Jewish Sports Hall of Fame in 1997.

== Personal life ==
Green graduated from Harvard College in 1936 and attended the Harvard Business School in 1937. In 1940, he married Ruth Pinanski. They had two daughters. Ruth Green died in 1983 and Green later married Ruby Herman. During World War II, Green was a lieutenant commander in a United States Navy anti-submarine warfare unit.

== Business career ==
Green and his brother, Alan, formed the Green Development Corp. In 1955, the Greens purchased the former town farm property in Saugus, Massachusetts with plans to construct a large shopping center. The New England Shopping Center was completed in 1961. The pair also developed the Lewiston Mall in Lewiston, Maine and the Turnpike Mall in Augusta, Maine.

== Later life ==
A former resident of Newton, Massachusetts, Green spent his later years in Boston and Palm Beach, Florida. In August 2004, the Associated Press falsely reported that he had died at the age of 92, due to a confusion with a man of same name. He died on March 30, 2005 in Palm Beach Gardens, Florida and was buried in the Temple Israel Cemetery in Wakefield, Massachusetts.

== See also ==
- List of select Jewish track and field athletes
- List of prematurely reported obituaries
