= Jean Lefèbvre (athlete) =

Belgian sprinter

Personal information
- Full name: Joannes Baptista Lefèbvre
- Born: 18 October 1893 Borgerhout, Antwerp, Belgium
- Spouse: Jeanne Van Kesteren

Sport
- Country: Belgium
- Sport: Athletics
- Event(s): 100 metres, long jump, javelin
- Club: K. Tubantia F.C.

Joannes Baptista "Jean" Lefèbvre (born 18 October 1893, date of death unknown) was a Belgian athlete. He competed in three events at the 1920 Summer Olympics. He was married to Jeanne Van Kesteren.
