= Rudolf Klupsch =

German sprinter

Personal information
- Nationality: German
- Born: 26 June 1905
- Died: 18 May 1992 (aged 86)

Sport
- Sport: Sprinting
- Event: 400 metres

Rudolf Klupsch (26 June 1905 – 18 May 1992) was a German sprinter. He competed in the men's 400 metres at the 1936 Summer Olympics.
