= 1938 European Athletics Championships – Men's 4 × 400 metres relay =

Men's 4 × 400 metres relay at the European Athletics Championships

The men's 4 × 400 metres relay at the 1938 European Athletics Championships was held in Paris, France, at Stade Olympique de Colombes on 5 September 1938.

== Medalists ==
Gold	Hermann Blazejezak; Manfred Bues; Erich Linnhoff; Rudolf Harbig; Germany
Silver	Jack Barnes; Alfred Baldwin; Alan Pennington; Godfrey Brown; Great Britain
Bronze	Lars Nilsson; Carl-Henrik Gustafsson; Bertil Thomasson; Bertil von Wachenfeldt; Sweden

== Results ==
=== Final ===
5 September

Rank	Nation	Competitors	Time	Notes
1st place, gold medalist(s)	Germany	Hermann Blazejezak; Manfred Bues; Erich Linnhoff; Rudolf Harbig	3:13.7	CR
2nd place, silver medalist(s)	Great Britain	Jack Barnes; Alfred Baldwin; Alan Pennington; Godfrey Brown	3:14.9	
3rd place, bronze medalist(s)	Sweden	Lars Nilsson; Carl-Henrik Gustafsson; Bertil Thomasson; Bertil von Wachenfeldt	3:17.3	
4	France	Joseph Bertolino; André Gardien; Jacques Lévèque; Prudent Joye	3:18.3	
5	Italy	Angelo Ferrario; Gioacchino Dorascenzi; Otello Spampani; Mario Lanzi	3:19.7	
6	Hungary	Gyula Gyenes; Ferenc Temesvári; József Vadas; János Görkói	3:22.9	

== Participation ==
According to an unofficial count, 24 athletes from 6 countries participated in the event.

- France (4)
- Germany (4)
- Hungary (4)
- Italy (4)
- Sweden (4)
- Great Britain (4)
