= Stockton, Wiltshire =

Village in Wiltshire, England

Coordinates: 51.144°N 2.029°W

Stockton
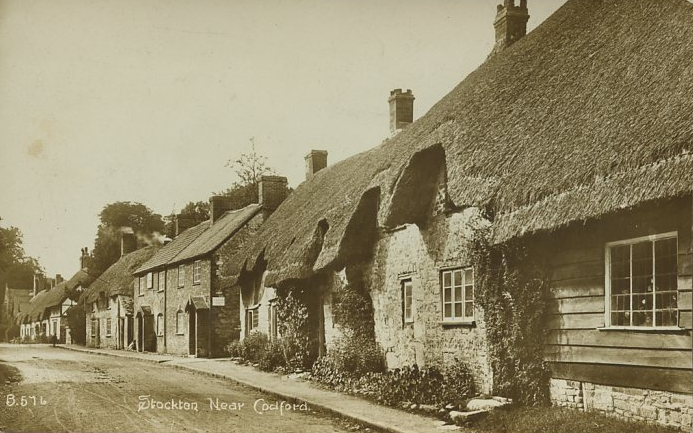
- Stockton, about 1910

- Location within Wiltshire
- Population: 204 (in 2011)
- OS grid reference: ST981383
- Unitary authority: Wiltshire
- Ceremonial county: Wiltshire
- Region: South West
- Country: England
- Sovereign state: United Kingdom
- Post town: Warminster
- Postcode district: BA12
- Dialling code: 01985
- Police: Wiltshire
- Fire: Dorset and Wiltshire
- Ambulance: South Western
- UK Parliament: South West Wiltshire
- Website: Parish Council

Stockton is a small village and civil parish in the Wylye Valley in Wiltshire, England, about 8 miles (13 km) southeast of Warminster. The parish includes the hamlet of Bapton.

== Location and extent ==
The village lies south of the A36 Warminster-Salisbury road and the River Wylye, on the minor road which follows the right bank of the river. The larger village of Codford is about one mile to the northwest.

When the civil parish of Fisherton Delamere was extinguished in 1934, the portion south of the Wylye (1,174 acres) was transferred to Stockton. This transfer included Bapton and Fisherton Mill, in the village of Fisherton Delamere. Stockton also has two cottages some three miles from the main village street at a remote spot called Great Bottom.

== History ==
Evidence of Neolithic presence includes a long barrow on Stockton Down. From the late Iron Age there was a settlement on a ridge in Stockton Wood, in the south of the present parish, which continued to be occupied in the Romano-British period until the 4th century. Now known as Stockton Earthworks, the site of about 70 hectares has been the subject of several archaeological investigations which produced many finds.

Stockton's boundaries were fixed by 901. The Domesday survey of 1086 recorded a settlement at Stottune with 13 households, and land held by the Bishop of Winchester.

Soon after the Dissolution, in 1547 the manor was granted to William Herbert, later 1st Earl of Pembroke. In 1585 his son sold the manor to John Topp, a London merchant tailor whose father and grandfather were yeomen of Stockton; the Topps retained ownership until the mid-18th century. Later owners of parts of the estate included Huyshe Yeatman-Biggs (1845–1922), Bishop successively of Southwark, Worcester and Coventry.

There were 140 poll-tax payers in 1377. The population of the parish peaked in the mid-19th century, with 307 recorded at the 1841 census. Numbers declined steadily to a low of 177 in 1931, and by 2011 had only recovered to 204.

== Church ==
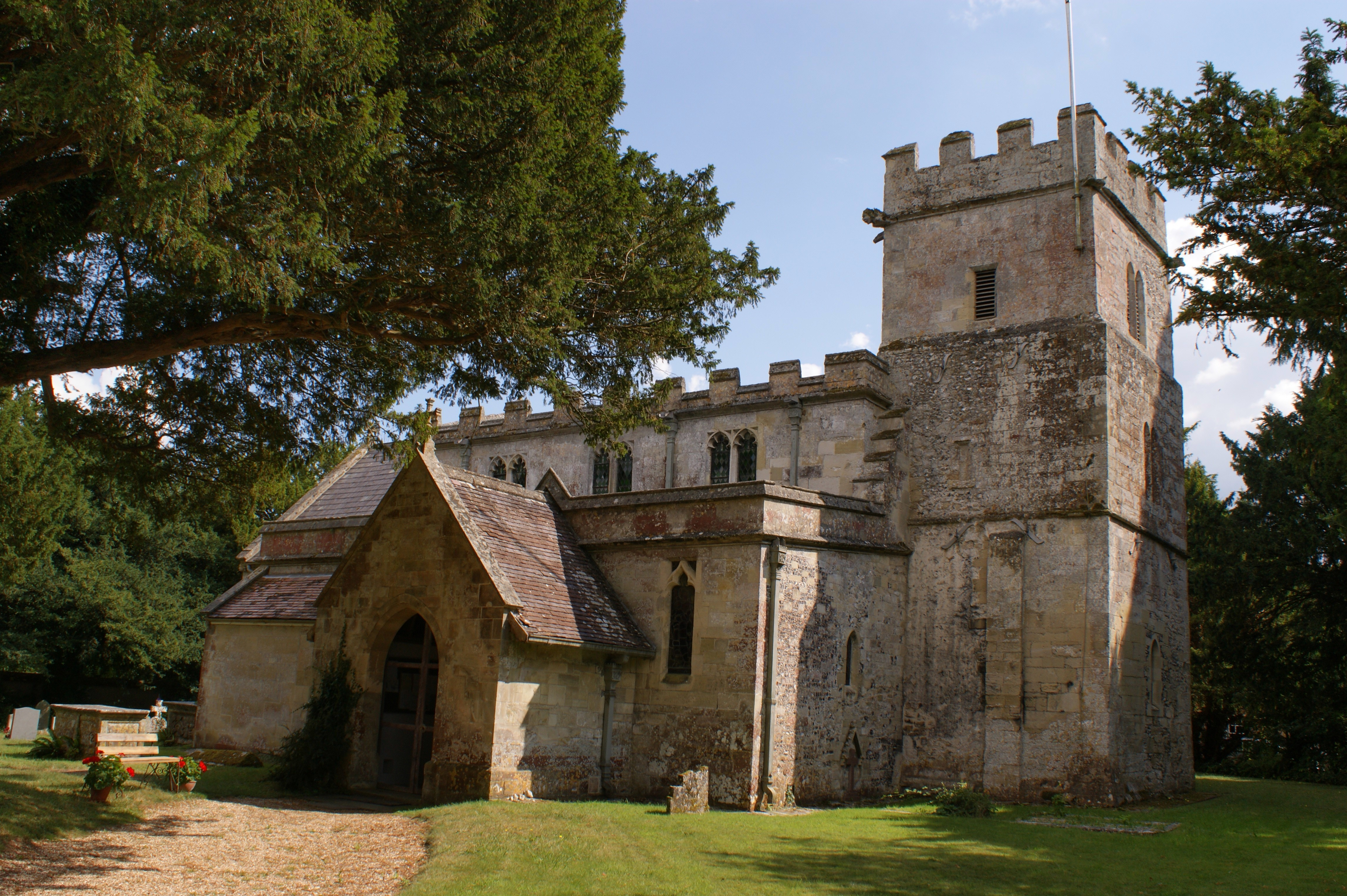
Church of St John the Baptist

A church at Stockton is first recorded in the 12th century. The present parish church, built of ashlar and some flint, is dedicated to St John the Baptist. Two bays of the arcades, with cylindrical piers, survive from the 12th century and the lower part of the west tower is early 13th; the arcades were extended east by one bay in the 14th century.

Restoration in the 19th century included work on the chancel in 1840, then construction of the vestry and general restoration in 1879. The church was recorded as Grade I listed in 1968. There are four bells, at present unringable; the tenor was cast c. 1400 at Salisbury, and the others were cast by Lott of Warminster in the 17th century.

Unusually, there is a solid wall between nave and chancel, pierced by a central doorway and two squints; in 1910 an almost full-height carved oak screen designed by Bodley & Garner was installed against it. In the aisles are a 14th-century effigy of a lady, and monuments from the 16th and 17th centuries for members of the Topp family of Stockton House and others.

In 1957 the benefice was united with Wylye to form the benefice of Wylye, Stockton and Fisherton Delamere which was dissolved in 1973 and replaced by the benefice of Codford St Peter with St Mary, Upton Lovell and Stockton. Later, the parish was extended under the name Middle Wylye Valley, and today the church, alongside nine others, is part of the Wylye and Till Valley benefice.

== Notable houses ==
=== Stockton House ===
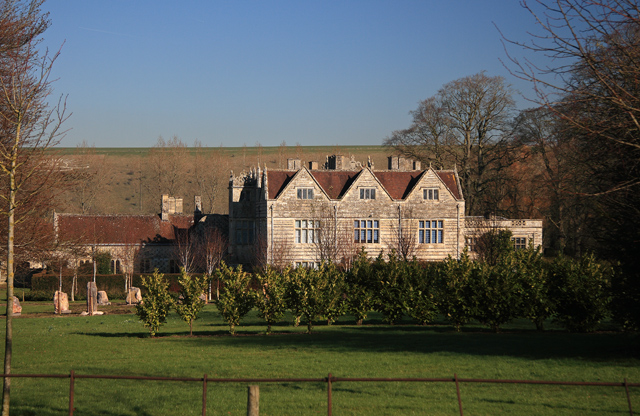
Stockton House

Stockton House, a Grade I listed country house to the north of the west end of the village, was built by John Topp in the 1580s, after his purchase of the manor.

Pevsner describes it as a "fine square Elizabethan house ... exceptionally rich in plasterwork and fireplaces". Built in banded limestone ashlar and flint, the house has a four-bay front with a three-storey porch. An attached 17th-century range, in chequered flint and stone, has a chapel and former minister's dwelling. To the northwest are 17th-century stables and an 1834 carriage house. 19th-century additions include a service and nursery wing, and a square water tower; work in 1877–1882 was designed by E. B. Ferrey under the ownership of Major-General A. G. Yeatman-Biggs, and on his death in 1898 the estate was inherited by his brother, Huyshe Wolcott Yeatman.

In 2014, Stockton House was bought by Nick Jenkins, founder of the Moonpig greetings card company, who carried out renovations.

=== Others ===
Long Hall, a Grade II* listed house near the church in the east end of the village, dates from the 15th century and has a five-bay 18th-century brick front. Since 1924 it has been the home of the Yeatman-Biggs family.

Six almshouses, grouped around a small courtyard, were built in 1657 by the Topp family. The single-storey dwellings are built in rubble stone with bands of dressed limestone, and wings added in 1714 provided two more dwellings.

Bapton Manor is another country house, rebuilt in the 1730s, probably on the site of a house from the 17th century or earlier.

== Amenities ==
Like several other villages, Stockton is within the catchment area of the Wylye Valley Church of England Primary School, on a site some two miles away at Cherry Orchard, Codford. The nearest secondary schools are at Warminster and Salisbury and include Warminster School.

Stockton has one pub, The Carriers, in the main village street.

Stockton Wood and Down is a biological Site of Special Scientific Interest in the south of the parish; the wood is part of the eastern extent of the Great Ridge Wood.

== Governance ==
Most local government services are provided by Wiltshire Council, which has its offices in Trowbridge, some fifteen miles to the north. Stockton also has its own elected parish council of five members.

The parish is represented in Parliament by the member of parliament for South West Wiltshire, Andrew Murrison, and in Wiltshire Council by Christopher Newbury.

== Notable people ==
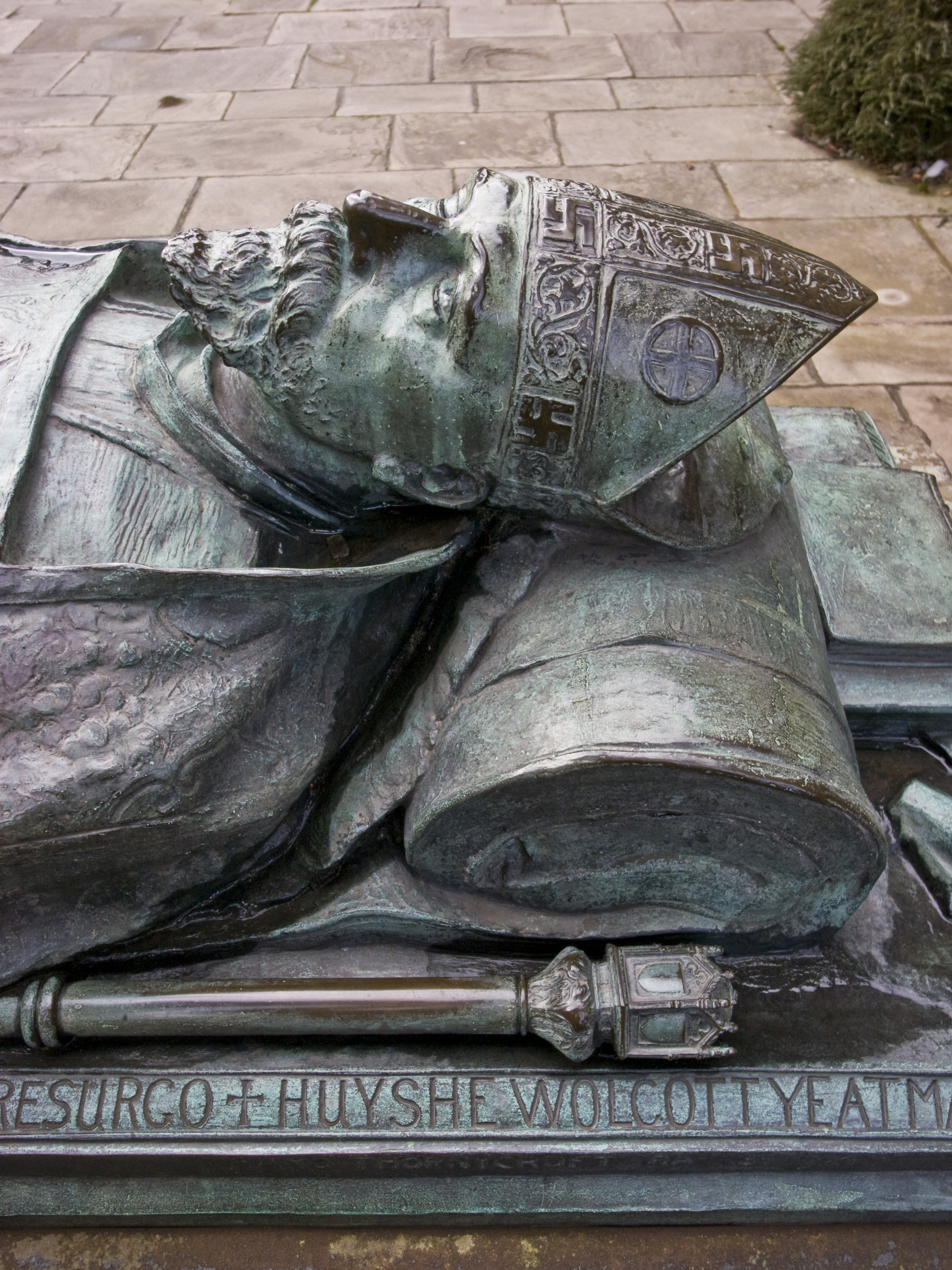
Effigy of Bishop Huyshe Wolcott Yeatman-Biggs, Coventry Cathedral

- Tomas Damett, rector from 1413, composer
- John Terry, rector 1590–1625, anti-Catholic controversialist
- William Creed, rector 1660–1663, professor of divinity at Oxford
- Huyshe Yeatman-Biggs (1845–1922), bishop and landowner
- Edward Tennant (1897–1916), war poet, born at Stockton House
- Nick Jenkins, businessman, owner of Stockton House since 2014
