= 1938 European Athletics Championships – Men's 400 metres =

Men's 400 metres at the European Athletics Championships

The men's 400 metres at the 1938 European Athletics Championships was held in Paris, France, at Stade Olympique de Colombes on 3 and 4 September 1938.

== Medalists ==
Gold	Godfrey Brown; Great Britain
Silver	Karl Baumgarten; Netherlands
Bronze	Erich Linnhoff; Germany

== Results ==
=== Final ===
4 September

Rank	Name	Nationality	Time	Notes
1st place, gold medalist(s)	Godfrey Brown	Great Britain	47.4	CR
2nd place, silver medalist(s)	Karl Baumgarten	Netherlands	48.2	
3rd place, bronze medalist(s)	Erich Linnhoff	Germany	48.8	
4	János Görkói	Hungary	48.9	
5	Aarne Tammisto	Finland	49.1	
6	Bertil von Wachenfeldt	Sweden	50.0	

=== Heats ===
3 September

==== Heat 1 ====
Rank	Name	Nationality	Time	Notes
1	Godfrey Brown	Great Britain	48.4	Q
2	János Görkói	Hungary	49.2	Q
3	Carl-Henrik Gustafsson	Sweden	49.8	
4	Ottavio Missoni	Italy	50.3	
5	Georges Meyer	Switzerland	50.3	
6	Abdyl Këllezi	Albania	55.0	

==== Heat 2 ====
Rank	Name	Nationality	Time	Notes
1	Erich Linnhoff	Germany	49.2	Q
2	Bertil von Wachenfeldt	Sweden	49.7	Q
3	Pierre Smet	Belgium	50.4	
4	Jean Cerutti	France	50.6	
5	Feri Pleteršek	Yugoslavia	52.3	
	József Vadas	Hungary	DQ	

==== Heat 3 ====
Rank	Name	Nationality	Time	Notes
1	Aarne Tammisto	Finland	48.3	Q
2	Karl Baumgarten	Netherlands	48.3	Q
3	John Horsfall	Great Britain	49.5	
4	Joseph Bertolino	France	49.5	
5	Charles Stein	Luxembourg	NT	

== Participation ==
According to an unofficial count, 17 athletes from 13 countries participated in the event.

- Albania (1)
- Belgium (1)
- Finland (1)
- France (2)
- Germany (1)
- Hungary (2)
- Italy (1)
- Luxembourg (1)
- Netherlands (1)
- Sweden (2)
- Switzerland (1)
- Great Britain (2)
- Yugoslavia (1)
