= John D. Terry =

U.S. Army soldier and Medal of Honor receiver

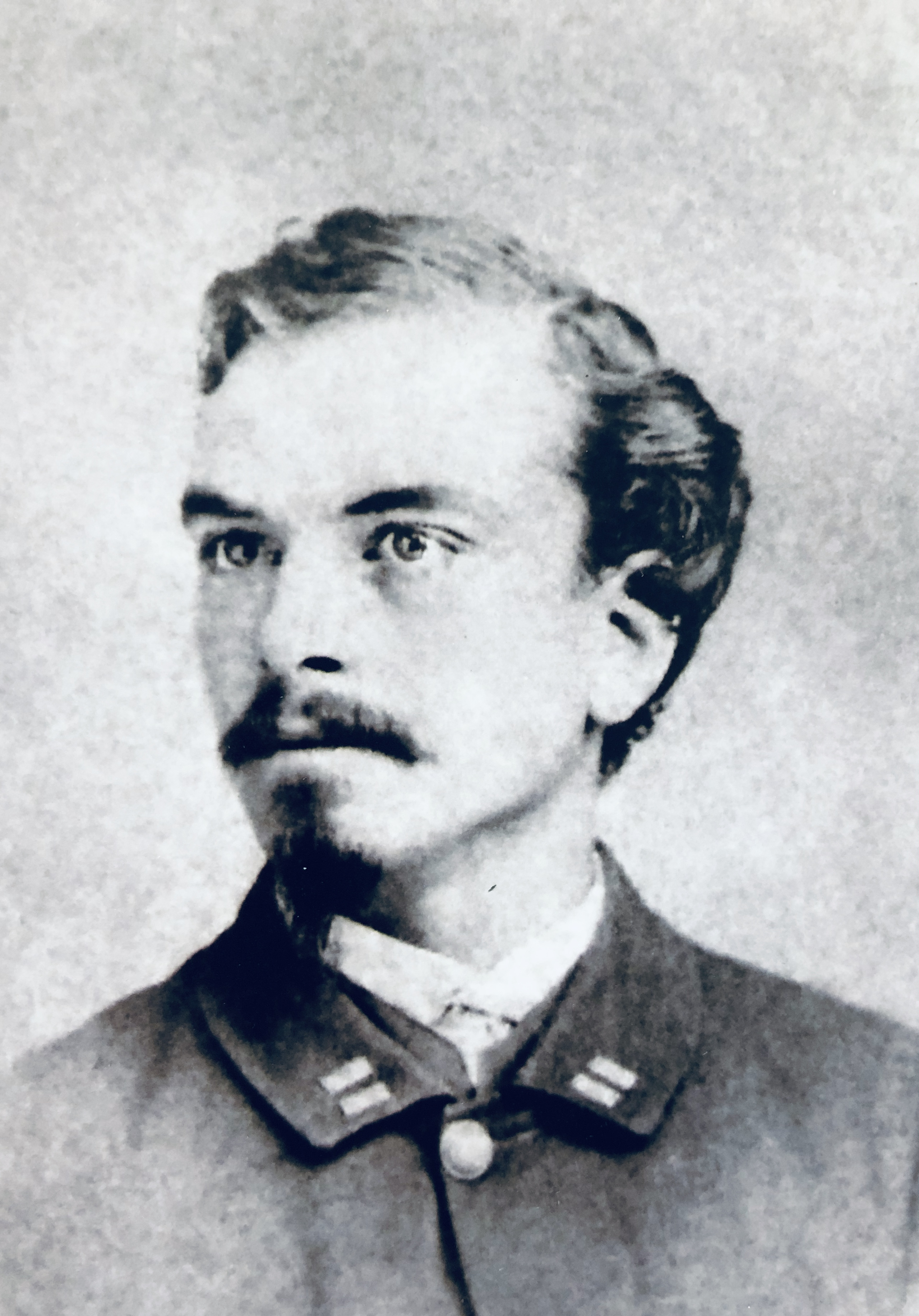
- Born: September 3, 1845; Montville, Maine
- Died: March 4, 1919 (aged 73); Manhattan, New York
- Burial place: Bronx, New York
- Spouse: Emma Celia Brown (m. 1866)
- Military career
- Allegiance: United States
- Branch: United States Army
- Service years: 1861–1865
- Rank: Brevet Major
- Units: Company E, 23rd Massachusetts Infantry; 35th U.S. Colored Infantry
- Conflicts: American Civil War: Battle of New Bern
- Awards: Medal of Honor

John Darling Terry (September 3, 1845 – March 4, 1919) was a United States Army soldier who fought in the American Civil War. Terry received the Medal of Honor for bravery during combat. Terry's medal was won for "extraordinary heroism" during the Battle of New Bern in North Carolina on March 14, 1862. He was honored with the award on October 12, 1867.

Terry was born in Montville, Maine. He joined the Army from Boston, Massachusetts, in September 1861, and was discharged due to the loss of his leg in March 1863. While recovering in Manhattan, New York he volunteered for service during the draft riots. He commanded a body of convalescent soldiers in July 1863 and on day three of the riots he received word that he was re-entering service as a lieutenant in the 1st North Carolina Colored Volunteers (later known as the 35th U.S. Colored Infantry), a regiment he fought with until the war's end. On May 23, 1865, after the official end of the war, Terry was promoted to captain. However, in the aftermath of the war's end and due to prejudice against officers working with the former slaves, his promotion was withdrawn. In September 1865 Terry was assigned to the Freedman's Bureau and while there was brevetted promotions to captain and major before his discharge. He died in Manhattan on March 4, 1919, and was buried at Woodlawn Cemetery (Bronx, New York), Butternut Plot, Section 141, Lot 14454.

His official rank remained lieutenant until 2013, almost 150 years later, when his great-grandson and other family members petitioned the ABCMR to reinstate his official rank of captain. After careful review the board determined that the evidence presented was sufficient and corrected the record reinstating Terry's permanent rank to captain.

== Medal of Honor citation ==
The President of the United States of America, in the name of Congress, takes pleasure in presenting the Medal of Honor to Sergeant John Darling Terry, United States Army, for extraordinary heroism on 14 March 1862, while serving with Company E, 23d Massachusetts Infantry, in action at New Bern, North Carolina. In the thickest of the fight, where he lost his leg by a shot, Sergeant Terry still encouraged the men until carried off the field.

== See also ==
- List of American Civil War Medal of Honor recipients: T–Z
