= John Terry (priest) =

John Terry (c.1555–1625) was a Church of England clergyman and anti-Catholic controversialist.

Educated at New College, Oxford, he was elected a fellow of the college until taking the living of Stockton, Wiltshire in 1590. The Triall of Truth attacked Roman Catholicism.

== Works ==
- The Triall of Truth, 1600
- The second part of the trial of truth, 1602
- The reasonablenesse of wise and holy truth, 1617
- Theologicall Logicke: or the third part of the Tryall of truth, 1625
