= Williamsfield, Ohio =

Unincorporated community in Ohio, U.S.

Coordinates: 41°32′00″N 80°34′14″W

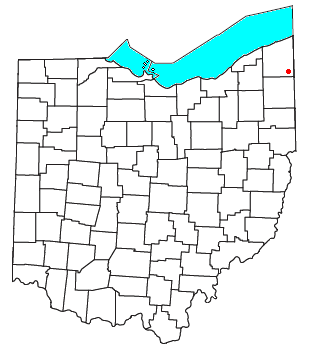
Location of Williamsfield, Ohio

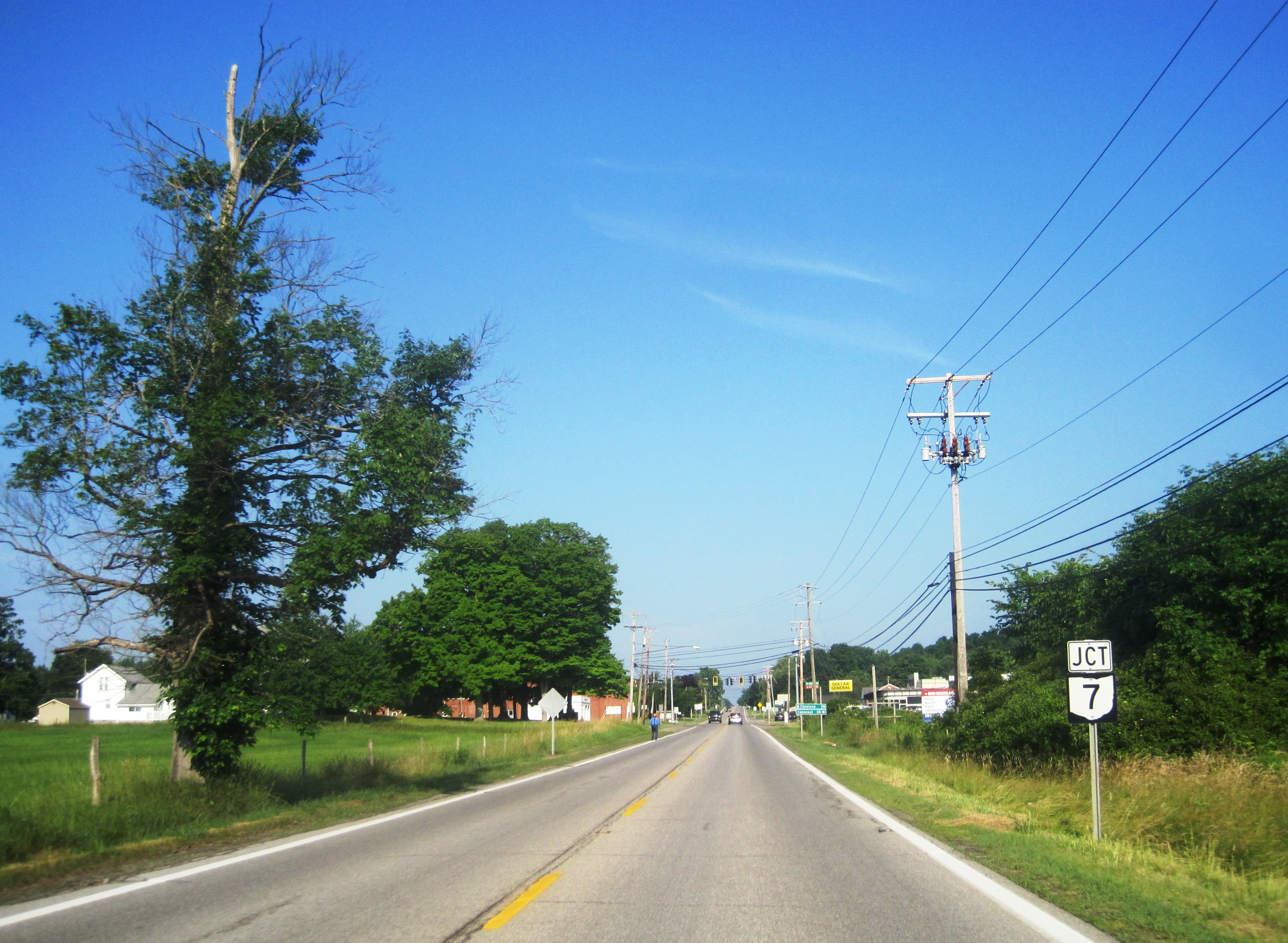
US 322 westbound in Williamsfield

Williamsfield is an unincorporated community in central Williamsfield Township, Ashtabula County, Ohio, United States. It has a post office with the ZIP code 44093. It lies at the intersection of U.S. Route 322 with State Route 7. In 2014, it was named the most stressed community in the United States.

The community was named for General Joseph Williams, an original owner of the town site.
