= John Terry (weightlifter) =

American weightlifter

John Terry (Pittsburgh, December 20, 1908 – High Point, North Carolina, April 17, 1970) was an Olympic weightlifter for the United States.

== Weightlifting achievements ==
- Olympic Games team member (1936 and 1940)
- Senior National Champion (1938–1941)

== Notes of interest ==
John Terry was a world record holder in the deadlift (610 lbs at 132 lbs bodyweight), and many consider him to be the greatest pound for pound deadlifter in world history when the time element is considered. In 2016, the 1936 Olympic journey of the eighteen Black American athletes, including Terry, was documented in the film Olympic Pride, American Prejudice.
