= Gunnar Christensen =

Danish sprinter and hammer thrower

Gunnar Normandus Fjord Christensen (8 July 1913 in Copenhagen – 7 July 1986 in Odense) was a Danish track athlete, hammer thrower and police officer. Christensen competed in the 1936 Summer Olympics, representing Denmark in the Men's 200 metres and 400 metres events.
