= Hermann Blazejezak =

German sprinter (1912–2008)

Medal record

Men's athletics

Representing Germany

European Championships
Gold medal – first place	1938 Paris	4×400 m

Hermann Blazejczak (3 June 1912 – 13 January 2008) was a German athlete who competed in the 1936 Summer Olympics. He was born in Hildesheim and died in Mönchengladbach.
