= Jeanne Van Kesteren =

Belgian javelin thrower (1907–2011)

Personal information
- Full name: Joanna Wilhelmina Hendrika Van Kesteren
- Born: 25 December 1907 Booischot, Belgium
- Died: 23 October 2011 (aged 103)
- Spouse: Jean Lefèbvre

Sport
- Country: Belgium
- Sport: Athletics
- Event: Javelin throw
- Club: CAF Schaerbeek

Joanna Wilhelmina Hendrika "Jeanne" Van Kesteren (later Lefèbvre, 25 December 1907 – 23 October 2011) was a Belgian athlete. She competed in the women's javelin throw at the 1936 Summer Olympics. She was married to Jean Lefèbvre. Van Kesteren died on 23 October 2011, at the age of 103.
