= Jimmy LuValle =

American athlete and scientist

Personal information
- Full name: James Ellis LuValle
- Nationality: American
- Born: November 10, 1912 San Antonio, TX
- Died: January 30, 1993 (aged 80) Te Anau, New Zealand
- Education: UCLA

Sport
- Sport: Track and field
Medal record
Men's athletics
Representing the United States
Bronze medal – third place	1936 Berlin	400 metres

James Ellis LuValle (November 10, 1912 – January 30, 1993) was an American athlete and scientist. He won the bronze medal in the 400 metres at the 1936 Summer Olympics, and was an accomplished chemist and founder of the Graduate Students Association at the University of California, Los Angeles (UCLA).

== Early life and education ==
LuValle was African-American. He was born on November 10, 1912, in San Antonio, TX. His family lived for a while in Washington, D.C., before moving to Los Angeles, CA while LuValle was in elementary school. He competed in track and field at LA Polytechnic High School (later renamed John H. Francis Polytechnic High School), while working as a page for the Los Angeles Public Library.

He enrolled at UCLA in 1931, turning down athletic scholarships to the University of Southern California (USC) and the University of Notre Dame. Nicknamed the "Westwood Whirlwind", he was the captain of the track and field team. In 1934 he ran 20.8 seconds for 220y, with Bob Kiesel and Foy Draper being the only sprinters in the world to match LuValle's time that year.

Despite his athletic prowess, he admitted his main focus was always academics. He did not have an athletic scholarship, given UCLA did not award track scholarships back then. He paid his way through school with a Regents' Scholarship and a job in the chemistry lab. He made friends with future Nobel Laureate Glenn T. Seaborg who was his teaching assistant for one class. He graduated Phi Beta Kappa in chemistry in June 1936, having had a straight-A average. He also won the Jake Gimball Award for most outstanding all-around senior.

== Olympics and later education ==
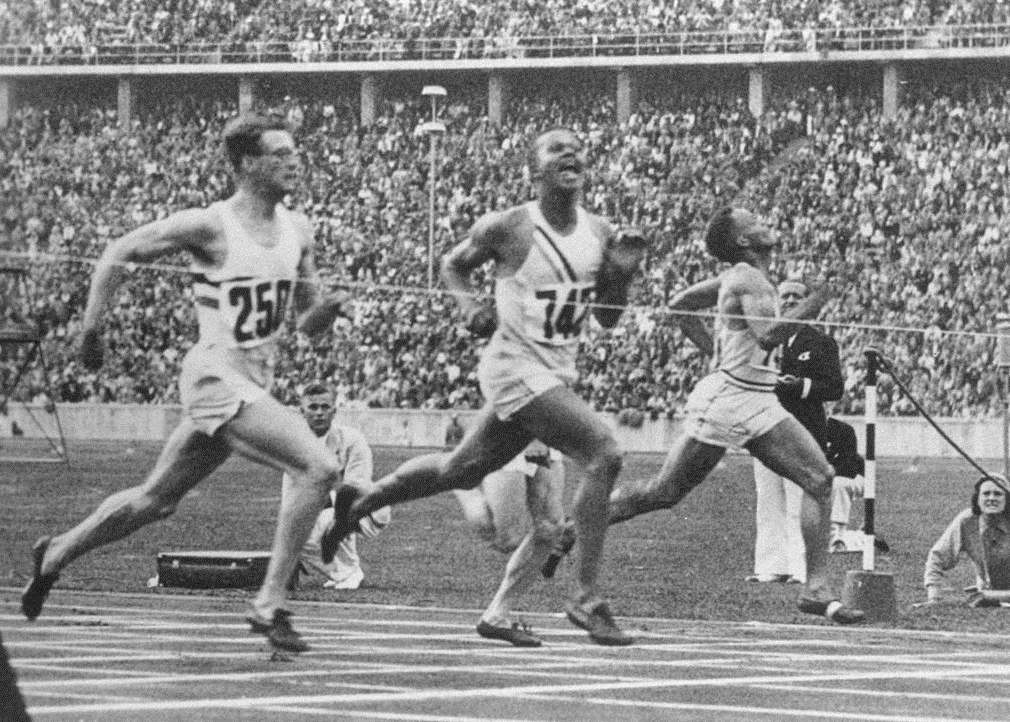
Godfrey Brown, Archie Williams and LuValle (right) during the 400 metres event at the 1936 Summer Olympics.

LuValle won the 400 meters at the Western Olympic Trials with a time of 46.3, his lifetime best. At the final Olympic Trials he placed third in 46.9, qualifying for the Olympic Games in Berlin. In the Olympics, he won the bronze medal in the 400 m with a time of 46.8 seconds on August 7. He came up behind American Archie Williams and Godfrey Brown of the United Kingdom.

He returned to UCLA in the fall of the same year to pursue a masters in chemistry and physics. He observed that graduate students were not interacting much with people outside their department, and that there needed to be an organization to bring them together. He took up the issue directly with Vern Knudsen, dean of the Graduate Council of the UC Academic Senate. Knudsen supported the establishment of the Associated Graduate Students, independent of the already-existing Associated Students UCLA (ASUCLA), which served undergraduates. It was later renamed the Graduate Students Association, and absorbed as a branch of ASUCLA, acting as the official student government for graduates. LuValle was also selected the ASG's first president.

In 1937, he was awarded his Master of Arts. He then went on to earn his Ph.D. in chemistry and mathematics in 1940 from the California Institute of Technology (Caltech), under the guidance of Nobel Laureate Linus Pauling. He was the first African American to receive a Ph.D. from Caltech.

== Career ==
He taught from 1940 to 1941 at Fisk University. From 1941 to 1942, he began working at Eastman Kodak Laboratories, becoming the first African American to work there. From 1942 to 1943, he helped with the war effort by working for the Office of Scientific Research and Development (OSRD). He returned to Kodak as Senior Chemist, which he served as until 1953.

From 1953 to 1959, he was Project Director at Technical Operations, Inc. Then he became Director of Basic Research at Fairchild Camera and Instrument Corporation. He later worked at SMC Corporation and Smith Corona Marchant before settling down as Laboratory Administrator for the chemistry department at Stanford University in 1975.

Throughout his career, his specialties were photochemistry, electron diffraction, magnetic resonance, solid state physics, and neurochemistry. His research on color photography resulted in three U.S. patents.

He died January 30, 1993, while on vacation in Te Anau, New Zealand.

== Legacy ==
In 1985, ASUCLA named its new student center LuValle Commons in his honor. Unlike the Ackerman Student Union at the campus center, it is more catered to graduate students, selling law and business textbooks. It contains Jimmy's Coffee House, and a food location called Jimmy's Kitchen. Los Angeles Mayor Tom Bradley, who spoke at the dedication ceremony, cited LuValle as an inspiration, for being able to follow in his footsteps as a track star at LA Poly and at UCLA, as well as for being able to overcome racial barriers to achieve his political aspirations. In 2016, the 1936 Olympic journey of the eighteen Black American athletes, including LuValle, was documented in the film Olympic Pride, American Prejudice.
