= Tidye Pickett =

American track and field athlete

Tidye A. Pickett Phillips

Personal information
- Full name: Tidye Ann Pickett

Sport
- Sport: Track and field

Tidye Pickett (November 3, 1914 – November 17, 1986) was American track and field athlete. She represented the United States in the 80-meter hurdles at the 1936 Summer Olympics in Berlin, becoming the first African-American woman to compete in the Olympic Games. In 2016, the 1936 Olympic journey of the eighteen Black American athletes, including interviews with Pickett's family, was documented in the film Olympic Pride, American Prejudice.

== Biography ==
Pickett was born in Chicago, Illinois, on November 3, 1914. Her parents were Sarah Pickett, a factory clerk, and Louis Pickett, a foundry foreman. She grew up in Englewood, a Chicago neighborhood.

She took up running as a schoolgirl; after competing in some local meets she caught the attention of long jumper John Brooks, who began to coach her. At the 1932 United States Olympic Trials Pickett competed in the 100-meter dash, winning her heat and placing third in her semi-final; she qualified for the final, where she placed sixth. Pickett was named to the American Olympic team as part of the eight-woman 4 × 100 meter relay pool; she and Louise Stokes, who was also part of the relay pool, were the first African-American women to be selected for the Olympic Games, but both of them were left out of the final four-woman relay lineup that ran at the Olympics. Pickett and Stokes suffered racial discrimination during their Olympic trip; whether racism also played a role in their omission from the Olympic relay is disputed and unclear.

Pickett continued her running career; in 1934 she ran the opening leg on a Chicago Park District team that set an unofficial world record of 48.6 in the 4 × 110 yard relay. At the 1936 United States Olympic Trials she competed in the 80-meter hurdles, placing second and qualifying for the Olympics in Berlin. At the Olympics, Pickett survived the heats but went out in the semi-finals, falling at the second hurdle and injuring herself; she was the first African-American woman, as well as the first Illinois State University athlete, to compete in the Olympic Games.

Pickett later became a schoolteacher, serving as principal at an elementary school in East Chicago Heights until her retirement in 1980; when she retired, the school was renamed after her. She died in Chicago Heights, Illinois, on November 17, 1986.
