= Juan Carlos Anderson =

Argentine track and field athlete

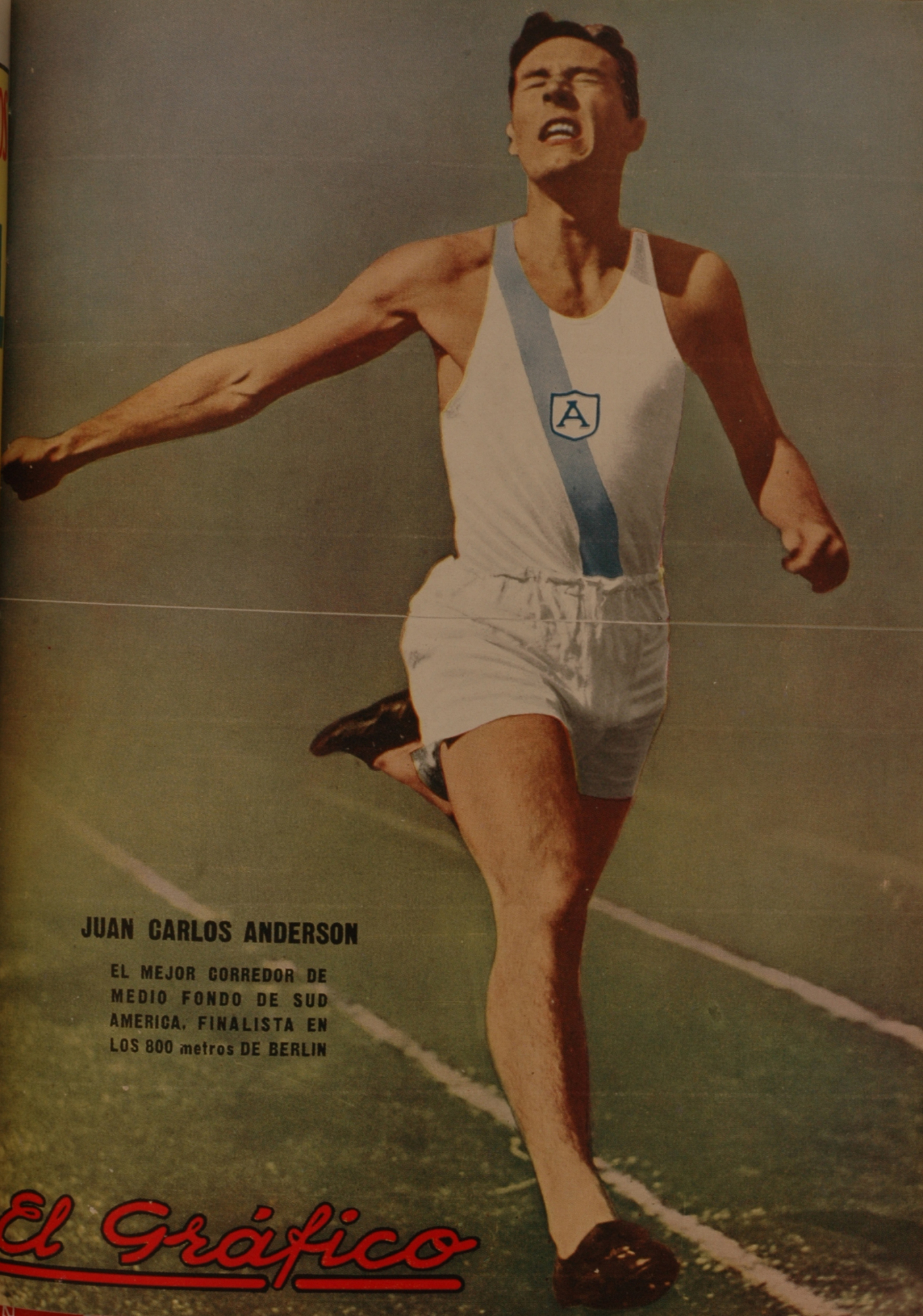
- Anderson in a 1936 edition of El Gráfico

Personal information
- Born: 9 January 1913 Buenos Aires, Argentina
- Died: 12 September 2005 (aged 92) Buenos Aires, Argentina

Sport
- Sport: Track and field athletics
- Event(s): 400m, 800m
- Club: Capital Federal

Achievements and titles
- Personal best: 400m - 48.4 (1934) 800m - 1.54.2 (1934)

Juan Carlos Anderson Munz (9 January 1913 – 12 September 2005) was an Argentine athlete who competed in the 1936 Summer Olympics. He reached the semi-finals of the 400 metres and finished fifth, after coming second in both the heats and the quarter-finals. He had more success in the 800 metres: reaching the final and coming seventh. After winning his heat he received a bye, meaning he did not have to compete in the quarter-final. He finished third in the semi-final.

== Times ==
=== 400m ===
Heat - 49.4 QF - 48.7 SF - 48.5

=== 800m ===
Heat - 1:55.1 SF - 1:54.8 Final - ?
