= Betty Burch =

American javelin thrower

Personal information
- Born: January 3, 1911 Bangor, Maine, United States
- Died: December 4, 1983 (aged 72) Berkeley, California, United States

Sport
- Sport: Athletics
- Event: Javelin throw

Betty Burch (3 January 1911 – 4 December 1983) was an American athlete. She competed in the women's javelin throw at the 1936 Summer Olympics.
