= Robert P. Rodenkirchen =

American athlete

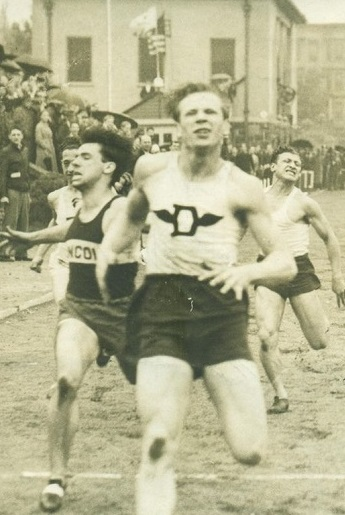
- Rodenkirchen 100 yard dash - 10.0 in 1936

Personal information
- Born: July 7, 1916 Mönchengladbach, Germany
- Died: August 4, 1990 (aged 74) Clara Maass Medical Center
- Height: 6 ft 2 in (188 cm)
- Weight: 195 lb (88 kg)

Sport
- Sport: Track and Field
- Event(s): 60yd, 100yd, 220yd, 100m, 200m
- Club: New York Athletic Club, North Texas State
- Coached by: Clair Birch

Achievements and titles
- Personal best(s): National Junior AAU Champion ('35); World Record – 60 yd. – 6.4 ('36,'38); World Record – 100 m – 10.7 ('38); World Record – 200 m – 21.0 ('36); World Record – 1 1/4 mile relay HCTCA Hall of Fame inductee ('79); NYAC Hall of Fame inductee ('86); John McGroarty Memorial Trophy ('38)

Robert Peter Rodenkirchen (July 7, 1916– August 4, 1990) was a German-born American track and field athlete who competed in sprints and was active in the mid-late 1930s. He set several world sprinting records and competed primarily in the 60-yard, 100-yard, 100-meter, 200-yard, and 200-meter events and ran for the New York Athletic Club (NYAC). Rodenkirchen gained national attention during the 1936 Olympic season by setting a world record in the 200-meter at the Eastern Trials. He received the John McGroarty Memorial Trophy in 1938 as the NYAC outstanding track & field athlete and remained in competition nationally for several years through 1939. After retirement, he was inducted to the NYAC Hall of Fame (1986), the Hudson County Track Coaches Hall of Fame (1979) and remained actively involved with the NYAC, as a meet official, in amateur athletics administration and athlete mentorship in New Jersey and New York.

== Early life ==
Rodenkirchen was born in Mönchengladbach, Germany and emigrated to the United States in 1928 at the age of eleven, arriving in Ellis Island at the New York City harbor with his family aboard the SS Belgenland. He grew up in Jersey City, New Jersey, and attended William L. Dickinson High School.

== Athletic career ==
Rodenkirchen began competing in track and field in 1933 after being recruited by Dickinson High School track coach Clair Birch. He quickly emerged as one of New Jersey's leading sprinters, setting multiple high school, Hudson county, and New Jersey state records. He also competed in Amateur Athletic Union (AAU) events and junior national competitions. Following the Olympic season, he competed for the New York Athletic Club through 1939. During this period, he recorded additional record setting sprint times in both indoor and outdoor competition.

== Later involvement in athletics ==
Rodenkirchen remained affiliated with the New York Athletic Club for more than 50 years. He served in various leadership roles, including membership on the Board of Governors and positions related to athletic administration and historical preservation within the club. He also led the development of a NYAC Hall of Fame initiative launched in 1981.

== Death and family ==
In August 1990, Rodenkirchen died from heart failure at age 74 at Belleville Medical Center, while visiting with his wife for a healthcare appointment.

== Legacy ==
After his death in 1990, the Robert Rodenkirchen Foundation was established to provide the Rodenkirchen Winged Foot Award, and a Memorial Scholarship to support for track and field athletes attending William L. Dickinson High School.
