= Gertrude Wilhelmsen =

American track & field athlete, discus thrower, javelin thrower, and softball player

Johanna Freda Gertrude Wilhelmsen (née Stelling; January 16, 1913 – March 19, 2005) was an American track and field athlete and softball player. She represented the United States at the 1936 Summer Olympics in Berlin, placing seventh in the women's javelin throw and eighth in the discus throw.

== Biography ==
Gertrude Stelling was born in Puyallup, Washington on January 16, 1913. She took up track and field at Puyallup High School. She placed fourth in the javelin throw at the 1932 United States Olympic Trials, narrowly missing out on qualifying for the 1932 Summer Olympics; the top three in each event were named to the American Olympic team. Stelling married Andrew Wilhelmsen in November 1932; their first child was born in 1934.

At the 1936 Olympic Trials Gertrude Wilhelmsen placed second in the discus throw (116 ft 9 in/35.59 m) and third in the javelin throw (119 ft 3 in/36.35 m), qualifying for the Olympic team in both events; in the javelin she defeated former world record holder Nan Gindele by a foot to win the last Olympic spot. She was the best American in both events at the Olympic Games in Berlin, placing seventh in the javelin throw and eighth in the discus throw.

In addition to track and field, Wilhelmsen competed in a variety of other sports, including softball, basketball and later golf. She was inducted in the Tacoma-Pierce County Baseball/Softball Hall of Fame as a fastpitch softball player in 1994. Wilhelmsen died in Puyallup on March 19, 2005.

Wilhelmsen competed in the 1992 Palm Desert Senior Olympics in track & field and other events.
