= Martha Worst =

American javelin thrower (1911–1981)

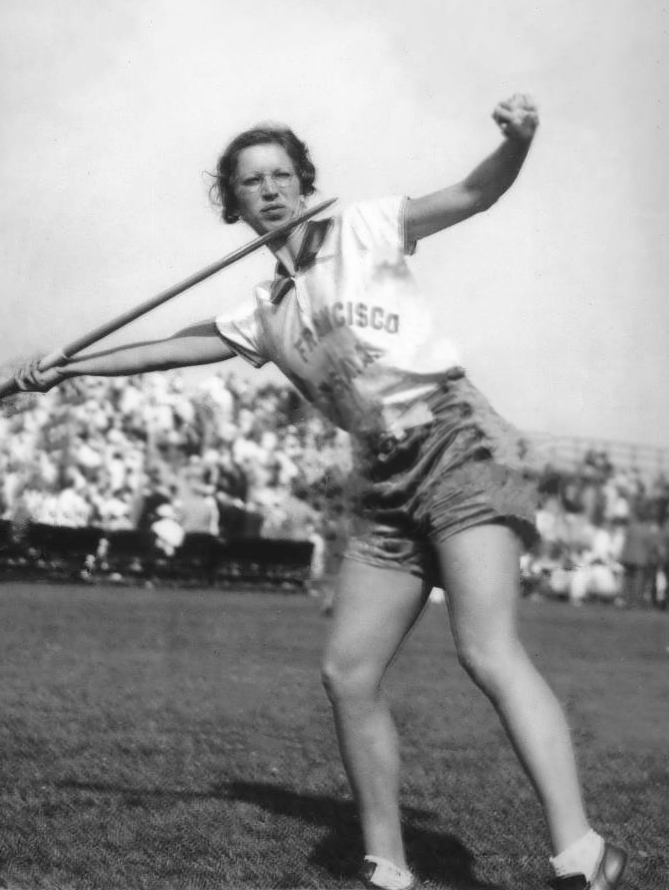
- Martha Worst at the 1936 AAU Championships

Personal information
- Full name: Martha Virginia Smith
- Born: Martha Virginia Worst; January 23, 1911 Chicago, Illinois, U.S.
- Died: December 9, 1981 (aged 70) Chico, California, U.S.

Sport
- Sport: Athletics
- Event: Javelin throw
- Club: Metro Social and Athletic Association

Achievements and titles
- Personal best: 40.13 m (1936)

Martha Virginia Worst (later Smith, January 23, 1911 – December 9, 1981) was an American javelin thrower. In 1936 she won the national AAU title and placed ninth at the Berlin Olympics.
