= Kathlyn Kelley =

American high jumper (1919–2006)

Kathlyn Kelley Owens (August 30, 1919 – September 12, 2006) was an American athlete who competed at the 1936 Summer Olympics in Berlin. At the women's high jump competition she placed a joint 9th after making 1.50m, but failing to clear 1.55m. Born in Seneca, South Carolina, she was never on the track team at high school, but was coached by school principal Julian Davis, who encouraged her to try out for the Olympics and found track coaches from Clemson University to work with her. At the 1936 United States Women's Olympic Trials she tied for third place, which led to a jump-off against Ida Myers that left Kelley with a bronze medal from the event and a spot on the national Olympic team. It was the last women's jump-off at an American Olympic trial until 2000. Despite having made the team, however, she needed to raise $500 to fund her trip, which she found difficult owing to the Great Depression. Davis, however, called upon South Carolina state senator Harry I. Hughes to convince the legislature, successfully, to pay for her journey. Prior to leaving for Germany she dined with the 1932 champion Jean Shiley and, during the Olympics, she roomed with gold medalists Helen Stephens and Betty Robinson. She planned to train for the 1940 Summer Olympics, and even received a track scholarship to Greenville Woman's College (which later became a part of Furman University), but was forced to leave the school after she was married in December 1938, per college policy. She then took up women's basketball, which she played until the birth of her first daughter in 1942, and eventually settled with a career as a beautician.
