= Billy McMahon (athlete) =

American long-distance runner (1910–1991)

William Francis McMahon (January 3, 1910 – February 26, 1991) was an American long-distance runner. He won the national marathon championship in 1936 and qualified for the Olympic marathon in Berlin, where he failed to finish.
