= Archie Williams =

American sprinter and Tuskegee Airman (1916–1993)

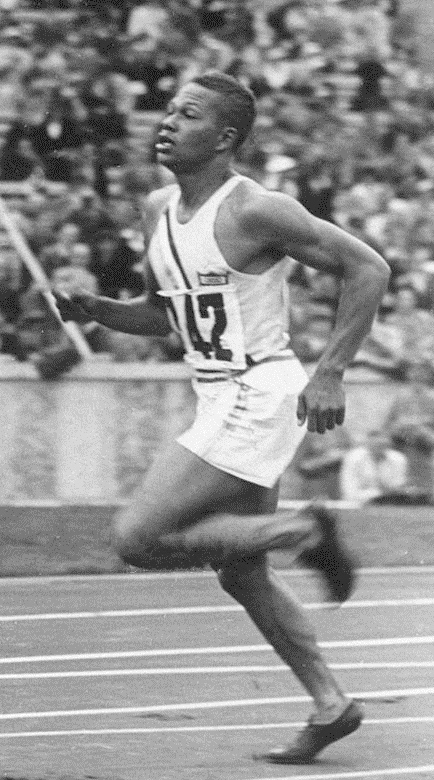
- Archie Williams at the 1936 Olympics

Personal information
- Born: Archie Franklin Williams; May 1, 1915 Oakland, California, U.S.
- Died: June 24, 1993 (aged 78) Fairfax, California, U.S.
- Education: University of California, Berkeley
- Height: 1.83 m (6 ft 0 in)
- Weight: 80 kg (176 lb)

Sport
- Sport: Athletics
- Events: 200 m, 400 m
- Club: California Golden Bears, Berkeley

Achievements and titles
- Personal bests: 200 m – 21.4 (1936); 400 m – 46.1 (1936)
Medal record
Representing the United States
Olympic Games
| Gold medal – first place | 1936 Berlin | 400 m |

Archie Franklin Williams (May 1, 1915 – June 24, 1993) was an American U.S. Air Force officer, athlete, and teacher. He was the winner of the 400 meter run at the 1936 Summer Olympics.

== Biography ==
Archie Williams was born in Oakland, California, to a family that was active in promoting Black civil rights. He attended University High School in Oakland, then San Mateo Junior College (now College of San Mateo). His coach, Dr. Oliver Byrd, was instrumental in preparing him for future achievements. Soon Williams transferred to the University of California, Berkeley, to become a mechanical engineer and he continued to run track.

Until 1936, Williams had never broken 49 seconds for the 440 yd (402 m). During 1936, however, Williams kept lowering his times and reached his peak at the NCAA championships, setting a world record in 400m of 46.1. His time was set in the preliminaries, and he also prevailed in the final for a 47.0 victory. He followed that up with a first in the Olympic Trials, then went to Berlin and won the Olympic gold medal in the 400m. When asked about the infamous incident in which Adolf Hitler reportedly refused to shake the hand of black fellow gold medalist Jesse Owens, Williams replied, "Hitler wouldn't shake my hand either." In 2016, the 1936 Olympic journey of the eighteen Black American athletes, including Williams, was documented in the film Olympic Pride, American Prejudice.

After graduating from UC Berkeley with a degree in mechanical engineering, Williams was in the first Civilian Pilot Training class in 1939 at Oakland, California. After earning his private pilot's license, he earned his instructor rating and was later a civilian instructor at Tuskegee. Entering the service in late 1942, he was one of only 14 African-Americans who were commissioned during World War II in the aviation meteorological cadet program; he graduated from the UCLA program on 6 September 1943. By September 1944, he was in the first Service Pilot training class at Tuskegee and, after graduation, instructed flight cadets in instrument flying as well as teaching meteorology. After the war, he earned qualification as a line pilot and then attended the Air Force Institute of Technology in 1948–1950 earning a B.S. in engineering sciences; he and fellow Tuskegee meteorologist Milton Hopkins were the 3rd and 4th black AF officers to attend this prestigious program. Williams remained a weather officer and rated pilot his entire career, earning his command pilot rating and commanding several weather detachments before retirement from the air force in 1964.

A serious leg injury at a meet in Sweden in 1936 ended his running career, but he became a commercial pilot. During World War II, which Williams once whimsically referred to as his "return to the Olympics—in the Pacific," Williams was a pilot in the U.S. Air Force and retired from the military 22 years later as a lieutenant colonel. A flight instructor while in the air force, Williams remained in education following his military retirement and taught mathematics and computers in California high schools.

Archie Williams was a teacher for 21 years until his retirement at age 72 in Sir Francis Drake High School in San Anselmo. He was noted for his love for teaching and helping students, including future author Konrad Dryden.

Sir Francis Drake High School was renamed Archie Williams High School in 2021, after the George Floyd protests spurred a worldwide reexamination of place names and monuments connected to racism.

Williams was a member of the Alpha Phi Alpha fraternity. He died in Fairfax, California on June 24, 1993. He was 78 years old.
