= Athletics at the 1948 Summer Olympics – Men's javelin throw =

Men's javelin throw at the Games of the XIV Olympiad
- Dates: August 4, 1948 (qualifying and final)
- Competitors: 23 from 14 nations
- Winning distance: 69.77

Medalists
1st place, gold medalist(s)		Tapio Rautavaara; Finland
2nd place, silver medalist(s)		Steve Seymour; United States
3rd place, bronze medalist(s)		József Várszegi; Hungary

The men's javelin throw event was part of the track and field athletics programme at the 1948 Summer Olympics. The competition was held on August 4. The final was won by Tapio Rautavaara from Finland.

== Records ==
Prior to the competition, the existing World and Olympic records were as follows.

World record	Yrjö Nikkanen (FIN)	78.70 m	Kotka, Finland	16 October 1938
Olympic record	Matti Järvinen (FIN)	72.71 m	Los Angeles, United States	4 August 1932

== Schedule ==
All times are British Summer Time (UTC+1)

Date	Time	Round
Wednesday, 4 August 1948	11:00	Qualifications
Wednesday, 4 August 1948	14:30	Finals

== Results ==
=== Qualifying round ===
Qual. rule: qualification standard 64.00m (Q) or at least best 12 qualified (q).

Rank	Name	Nationality	Result	Notes
1	Martin Biles	United States	67.68	Q
2	Per-Arne Berglund	Sweden	67.02	Q
3	Tapio Rautavaara	Finland	64.68	Q
4	Gunnar Petersson	Sweden	64.04	Q
5	Steve Seymour	United States	63.83	q
6	Lumír Kiesewetter	Czechoslovakia	63.25	q
7	Odd Mæhlum	Norway	63.00	q
8	Mirko Vujačić	Yugoslavia	62.53	q
9	Pauli Vesterinen	Finland	61.67	q
10	József Várszegi	Hungary	61.63	q
11	Soini Nikkinen	Finland	61.21	q
12	Bob Likins	United States	61.00	q
13	Ricardo Héber	Argentina	60.82	
14	Raymond Tissot	France	58.19	
15	Dušan Vujačić	Yugoslavia	57.62	
16	Nico Lutkeveld	Netherlands	56.25	
17	Jóel Sigurðsson	Iceland	55.69	
18	Pedro Apellániz	Spain	54.93	
19	Morville Chote	Great Britain	54.84	
20	Leo Roininen	Canada	53.92	
21	Malcolm Dalrymple	Great Britain	53.17	
22	Halil Zıraman	Turkey	53.30	
23	Pierre Sprécher	France	52.30	
	Sven Daleflod	Sweden	DNS	
	Erwin Pektor	Austria	DNS	
	Luis Ganoza	Peru	DNS	
	Jaime Piqueras	Peru	DNS	

=== Final ===
Rank	Athlete	Nationality	1	2	3	4	5	6	Result	Notes
1st place, gold medalist(s)	Tapio Rautavaara	Finland	69.77	x	57.59	59.43	61.86	58.95	69.77	
2nd place, silver medalist(s)	Steve Seymour	United States	x	62.37	67.56	61.72	63.58	61.00	67.56	
3rd place, bronze medalist(s)	József Várszegi	Hungary	67.03	58.14	60.29	57.53	59.71	58.35	67.03	
4	Pauli Vesterinen	Finland	65.44	60.96	63.01	61.76	65.89	65.79	65.89	
5	Odd Mæhlum	Norway	65.32	62.00	61.67	59.23	60.59	59.33	65.32	
6	Martin Biles	United States	58.70	65.09	65.17	59.09	64.10	65.17	65.17	
7	Mirko Vujačić	Yugoslavia							64.89	
8	Bob Likins	United States							64.51	
9	Gunnar Petersson	Sweden							62.80	
10	Per-Arne Berglund	Sweden							62.62	
11	Lumír Kiesewetter	Czechoslovakia							60.25	
12	Soini Nikkinen	Finland							58.05	

== Sources ==
- Organising Committee for the XIV Olympiad, The (1948). "The Official Report of the Organising Committee for the XIV Olympiad" (PDF). LA84 Foundation. Archived from the original (PDF) on September 27, 2013.
