= 1946 European Athletics Championships – Men's javelin throw =

Men's javelin throw at the European Athletics Championships

The men's javelin throw at the 1946 European Athletics Championships was held in Oslo, Norway, at Bislett Stadion on 25 August 1946.

== Medalists ==
Gold	Lennart Atterwall; Sweden
Silver	Yrjö Nikkanen; Finland
Bronze	Tapio Rautavaara; Finland

== Results ==
=== Final ===
25 August

Rank	Name	Nationality	Result	Notes
1st place, gold medalist(s)	Lennart Atterwall	Sweden	68.74	
2nd place, silver medalist(s)	Yrjö Nikkanen	Finland	67.50	
3rd place, bronze medalist(s)	Tapio Rautavaara	Finland	66.40	
4	Odd Mæhlum	Norway	66.37	
5	Sven Daleflod	Sweden	64.79	
6	Josef Neumann	Switzerland	62.48	
7	Lumír Kiesewetter	Czechoslovakia	59.91	
8	Nico Lutkeveld	Netherlands	59.50	

=== Qualification ===
24 August

Rank	Name	Nationality	Result	Notes
1	Lennart Atterwall	Sweden	67.21	Q
2	Yrjö Nikkanen	Finland	66.30	Q
3	Tapio Rautavaara	Finland	63.03	Q
4	Sven Daleflod	Sweden	62.93	Q
5	Odd Mæhlum	Norway	62.91	Q
6	Josef Neumann	Switzerland	60.36	Q
7	Nico Lutkeveld	Netherlands	60.07	Q
8	Lumír Kiesewetter	Czechoslovakia	59.80	Q
9	Michael Salomonsen	Norway	58.74	
10	Jóel Sigurðsson	Iceland	58.06	
11	Raymond Tissot	France	57.63	
12	Pierre Sprecher	France	55.22	
13	Oskar Ospelt	Liechtenstein	52.73	

== Participation ==
According to an unofficial count, 13 athletes from 9 countries participated in the event.

- Czechoslovakia (1)
- Finland (2)
- France (2)
- Iceland (1)
- Liechtenstein (1)
- Netherlands (1)
- Norway (2)
- Sweden (2)
- Switzerland (1)
