= Athletics at the 1936 Summer Olympics – Men's javelin throw =

Men's javelin throw at the Games of the XI Olympiad
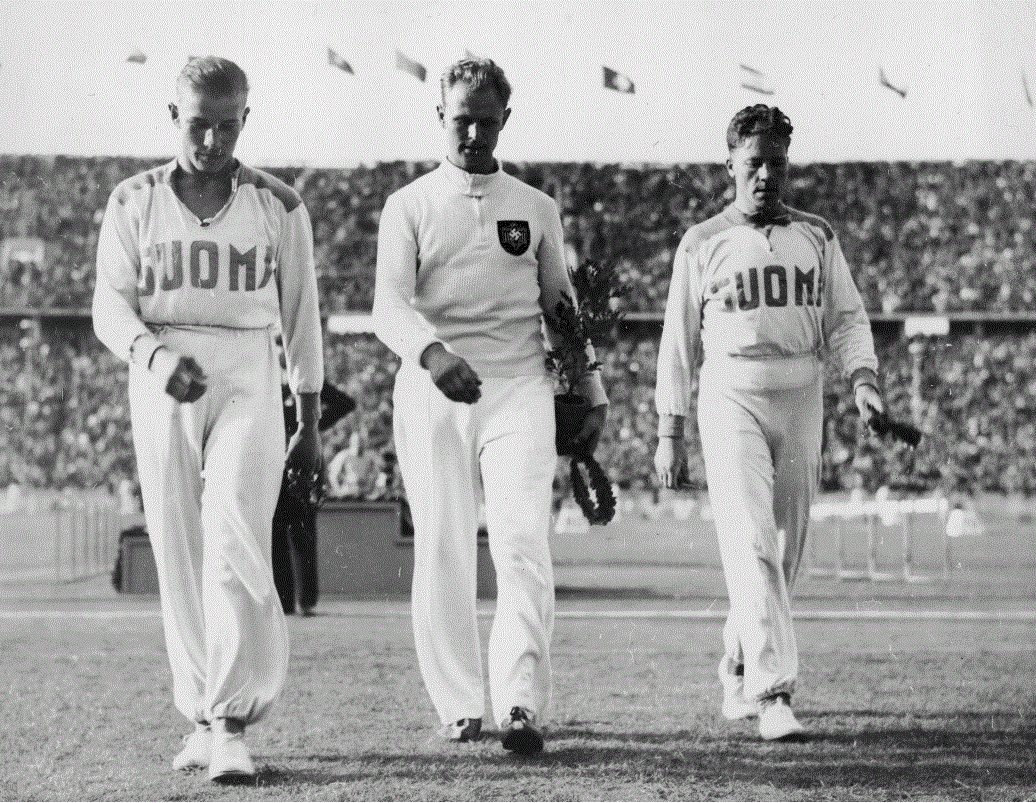
- Three best men javelin thrower of Berlin 1936 Olympics
- Venue: Olympiastadion: Berlin, Germany
- Dates: August 6, 1936
- Competitors: 28 from 19 nations

Medalists
1st place, gold medalist(s)		Gerhard Stöck; Germany
2nd place, silver medalist(s)		Yrjo Nikkanen; Finland
3rd place, bronze medalist(s)		Kalervo Toivonen; Finland

The men's javelin throw event was part of the track and field athletics programme at the 1936 Summer Olympics. The competition was held on August 6, 1936. The final was won by Gerhard Stöck of Germany.

== Results ==
=== Qualifying ===
Rank	Athlete	Nationality	1	2	3	Result	Notes
1	József Várszegi	Hungary	58.5	69.7		69.7	
2	Yrjo Nikkanen	Finland	59.6	67.0		67.0	
3	Matti Järvinen	Finland	66.0			66.0	
4	Eugeniusz Lokajski	Poland	65.5			65.5	
5	Kalervo Toivonen	Finland	59.0	64.9		64.9	
5	Gustav Sule	Estonia	64.9			64.9	
7	Lennart Atterwall	Sweden	64.4			64.4	
8	Gerhard Stöck	Germany	63.5			63.5	
9	Gottfried Weimann	Germany	63.2			63.2	
10	Walter Turczyk	Poland	59.0	foul	63.1	63.1	
11	Oto Jurģis	Latvia	58.0	59.8	61.9	61.9	
12	Jaap van der Poll	Netherlands	58.0	61.7		61.7	
13	Alton Terry	United States	61.5			61.5	
14	Lee Bartlett	United States	60.8			60.8	
15	Jim Courtright	Canada	foul	60.3		60.3	
15	Friedrich Gerdes	Germany	foul	60.3		60.3	
17	Malcolm Metcalf	United States	60.2			60.2	
18	Ibrahim Okasha	Egypt	50.0	foul	58.0	58.0	
19	Konstantinos Metaxas	Greece	50.0	56.0	56.0	56.0	
20	Noboru Ueno	Japan	54.0	55.0	48.0	55.0	
20	Rudolf Markušić	Yugoslavia	50.0	55.0	50.0	55.0	
22	Josef Neumann	Switzerland	52.0	50.0	47.0	52.0	
22	Kristján Vattnes	Iceland	46.0	52.0	45.0	52.0	
22	Napoleon Papageorgiou	Greece	50.0	52.0	52.0	52.0	
25	Josef Klein	Czechoslovakia	50.0	foul	50.0	50.0	
26	Hoh Chunde	Republic of China	48.0	40.0	40.0	48.0	
26	Pavol Mal'a	Czechoslovakia	foul	48.0	48.0	48.0	
28	Elias Gutiérrez	Colombia	31.1	35.0	foul	35.0	

=== Final ===
Rank	Athlete	Nationality	1	2	3	4	5	6	Result	Notes
1st place, gold medalist(s)	Gerhard Stöck	Germany	x	68.11	65.50	66.00	71.84	65.00	71.84	
2nd place, silver medalist(s)	Yrjo Nikkanen	Finland	x	70.77	x	62.00	62.00	63.00	70.77	
3rd place, bronze medalist(s)	Kalervo Toivonen	Finland	62.00	67.00	68.76	x	70.72	x	70.72	
4	Lennart Atterwall	Sweden	67.15	69.20	x	65.00	61.00	62.00	69.20	
5	Matti Järvinen	Finland	68.30	69.18	x	64.00	x	66.00	69.18	
6	Alton Terry	United States	67.10	67.15	x	64.00	65.00	62.00	67.15	
7	Eugeniusz Lokajski	Poland							66.39	
8	József Várszegi	Hungary							65.30	
9	Gottfried Weimann	Germany							63.58	
10	Walter Turczyk	Poland							63.36	
11	Gustav Sule	Estonia							63.26	
12	Lee Bartlett	United States							61.15	
13	Oto Jurģis	Latvia							60.71	
14	Jim Courtright	Canada							60.54	
15	Malcolm Metcalf	United States							58.20	
16	Jaap van der Poll	Netherlands							56.25	
17	Friedrich Gerdes	Germany							55.93	
