= Deaths in November 2003 =

The following is a list of notable deaths in November 2003.

Entries for each day are listed alphabetically by surname. A typical entry lists information in the following sequence:

- Name, age, country of citizenship at birth, subsequent country of citizenship (if applicable), reason for notability, cause of death (if known), and reference.

== November 2003 ==
=== 1 ===
- W. Brian Harland, 86, British geologist.
- Colin Hayes, 83, British artist.
- Joe Johnson, 73, American gridiron football player (Green Bay Packers, Boston Patriots).
- Kent Kennan, 90, American composer, author, and professor.
- Henryk Machalica, 73, Polish film and stage actor, fall from horse.
- Libero Marchini, 89, Italian football player and Olympian (1936).
- Sonny Senerchia, 72, American baseball player (Pittsburgh Pirates) and college baseball coach (Monmouth University), motorcycle accident.
- Daishiro Yoshimura, 56, Japanese football player and manager, intracranial hemorrhage.

=== 2 ===
- Xela Arias, 41, Spanish Galician-language poet and translator, heart attack.
- Christabel Bielenberg, 94, British writer (The Past is Myself, Christabel).
- Fernando Vizcaíno Casas, 77, Spanish labour lawyer, journalist and writer.
- Ted Cunningham, 65, Australian politician.
- Nati Kaji, 77, Nepali singer and songwriter.
- Iris Kelso, 76, American journalist.
- Frank McCloskey, 64, American Congressman (Indiana's 8th district) from 1983 to 1995, bladder cancer.
- Jimmy Quillen, 87, American politician (U.S. Representative for Tennessee's 1st congressional district).
- Vincent Rakabaele, 55, Lesotho Olympic long-distance runner (1980, 1984).
- Frederic Vester, 77, German cybernetician.
- Cliff Young, 81, Australian potato farmer and long distance runner, won Sydney to Melbourne Ultramarathon in 1983 at 61, cancer.

=== 3 ===
- Derk Bodde, 94, American sinologist.
- Aaron Bridgers, 85, American-French jazz pianist, featured in the 1961 Paul Newman film Paris Blues.
- Yuri Falin, 66, Soviet football player.
- Rasul Gamzatov, 80, Avarian/Soviet/Russian poet, called the "People's poet of Dagestan".
- A. James Manchin, 76, American politician, Secretary of State and State Treasurer for West Virginia, heart attack.
- Narendra Prasad, 57, Indian (Malayalam) film actor, professor and writer, cardio-respiratory arrest.

=== 4 ===
- Manadel al-Jamadi, Iraqi extrajudicial prisoner at Abu Ghraib prison, torture.
- Lotte Berk, 90, German-English dancer and teacher, created Barre fitness classes.
- Charles Causley, 86, British poet.
- Rachel de Queiroz, 92, Brazilian writer and journalist.
- Ken Gampu, 74, South African actor.
- Jim Purnell, 61, American football player (Wisconsin Badgers, Chicago Bears, Los Angeles Rams).
- 19th Kushok Bakula Rinpoche, 86, Indian buddhist lama.
- Philip Slone, 96, American soccer player.
- R. M. Williams, 95, Australian bush-wear manufacturer, known for their handcrafted riding boots.
- Richard Wollheim, 80, British philosopher and an authority on psychoanalysis and art.

=== 5 ===
- David Bar-Ilan, 73, Israeli concert pianist, journalist and political aide (Benjamin Netanyahu).
- Hugh H. Bownes, 83, American judge (Senior Judge of the 1st Cir.) and politician.
- Dorothy Fay, 88, American actress.
- Jack Gregory, 88, American football player (Cleveland Rams).
- Subrata Guha, 57, Indian cricket player, heart attack.
- Bobby Hatfield, 63, American singer, half of duo the Righteous Brothers, heart attack.
- Hans Heinrich, 92, German film editor, screenwriter and film director.
- Zaim Muzaferija, 80, Bosnian actor and poet.
- Lyman Ray Patterson, 74, American law professor and historian.
- Dernell Stenson, 25, American baseball player (Cincinnati Reds), killed during robbery.

=== 6 ===
- Just Betzer, 59, Danish film producer (Babette's Feast: 1988 Academy Award for Best Foreign-Language Film), heart attack.
- Miguel Casas, 83, Spanish cyclist.
- Franci Čop, 88, Slovenian Olympic alpine skier (1936, 1948).
- Philip Effiong, 77, Nigerian military officer.
- Crash Holly, 32, American professional wrestler, suicide by drug overdose.
- Zoe Incrocci, 86, Italian actress and voice actress.
- Spider Jorgensen, 84, American baseball player (Brooklyn Dodgers, New York Giants).
- Rie Mastenbroek, 84, Dutch swimmer and Olympian (1936).
- Eduardo Palomo, 41, Mexican actor, heart attack.
- Rudolf Schönbeck, 84, German footballer and Olympian (1952).

=== 7 ===
- Jack Durrance, 91, American rock climber and mountaineer.
- Donald Griffin, 88, American professor of zoology.
- Foo Foo Lammar, 66, British drag queen.
- Juanjo Menéndez, 74, Spanish actor, Alzheimer's disease.
- Vincenzo Rubolotta, 89, Italian Olympic rower (1956).
- Pierre Sprécher, 81, French Olympic athlete (1948).

=== 8 ===
- Bob Grant, 71, English actor, comedian and writer, suicide by carbon monoxide poisoning.
- C. Z. Guest, 83, American actress, author, columnist and socialite.
- Ernst Kossmann, 81, Dutch historian.
- Guy Speranza, 47, American singer, pancreatic cancer.
- Richard Swift, 76, American composer and music theorist.
- Abdirahman Ahmed Ali Tuur, 72, Somali politician.

=== 9 ===
- Buddy Arnold, 77, American jazz saxophonist.
- Stephen Benton, 61, American scientist, teacher and artist, inventor of the rainbow hologram.
- Art Carney, 85, American actor (The Honeymooners, Harry and Tonto, The Late Show), Oscar winner (1975).
- Bruce Alexander Cook, 71, American journalist and author.
- Pushpalata Das, 88, Indian independence activist and social worker.
- Gordon Onslow Ford, 90, British-American surrealist painter.
- Mario Merz, 78, Italian artist.

=== 10 ===
- Margaret Armen, 82, American television screenwriter (The Rifleman, The Big Valley, Star Trek, Barnaby Jones).
- Canaan Banana, 67, Zimbabwean politician and minister, first president of Zimbabwe, cancer.
- June Beebe, 90, American professional golfer, won the Women's Western Open in 1931 and 1933.
- Edvard Beyer, 83, Norwegian literary historian, literary critic, and professor.
- Hans Hermes, 91, German mathematician and logician.
- Irv Kupcinet, 91, American columnist and television personality, pneumonia.
- Morten Lange, 83, Danish mycologist and politician.
- Czesław Marchewczyk, 91, Polish ice hockey player and Olympian (1932, 1936, 1948).
- Jed Williams, 51, Welsh jazz journalist and artistic director of the Brecon Jazz Festival.
- Vasilije Šijaković, 74, Montenegrin football player.

=== 11 ===
- Andrei Bolibrukh, 53, Soviet (Russian) mathematician, known for his work on ordinary differential equations.
- Robert Brown, 82, British actor (spy boss M in four James Bond films), cancer.
- George Wallace, Baron Wallace of Coslany, 97, British politician and life peer (MP for Chislehurst).
- Harold Walker, Baron Walker of Doncaster, 76, British politician (MP for Doncaster and Doncaster Central).
- Peter Gallagher, 66, Australian rugby league footballer.
- Paul Janssen, 77, Belgian physician and founder of Janssen Pharmaceutica.
- John Emmett Lyle, Jr., 93, American politician, member of the United States House of Representatives (1945-1955).
- Claës-Henrik Nordenskiöld, 86, Swedish Air Force officer and sailor.
- Lloyd Pettit, 76, American sportscaster.
- Miquel Martí i Pol, 74, Catalan poet, multiple sclerosis.
- Lidija Rupnik, 88, Slovenian gymnast and Olympian (1936).
- Shunsuke Shima, 71, Japanese actor and voice actor.
- Don Taylor, 67, British theatre and television director.

=== 12 ===
- Jonathan Brandis, 27, American actor (seaQuest DSV, It, Sidekicks), suicide by hanging.
- Whitfield Cook, 94, American writer of screenplays, stage plays, short stories and novels.
- Cameron Duncan, 17, New Zealand filmmaker, bone cancer.
- Enrique Fernández, 59, Argentine footballer.
- Kay E. Kuter, 78, American actor.
- Andrés Molina, 59, Cuban boxer and Olympian (1968, 1972).
- Penny Singleton, 95, American actress, singer and dancer, stroke.
- John Tartaglione, 82, American comic book artist, esophageal cancer.
- Tony Thompson, 48, American drummer for The Power Station, kidney cancer.

=== 13 ===
- Ray Harris, 76, American rockabilly musician and songwriter.
- Nobuo Okishio, 76, Japanese marxian economist.
- Andrew Vázsonyi, 87, Hungarian-American mathematician, founder of The Institute of Management Sciences.
- Kellie Waymire, 36, American actress (Star Trek: Enterprise, Six Feet Under), cardiac arrest.

=== 14 ===
- Pierre Camonin, 100, French organist and composer.
- Giles Gordon, 63, Scottish literary agent and writer.
- Halldór Halldórsson, 72, Icelandic footballer.
- Hans Hansson, 84, Swedish Olympic alpine skier (1948).
- F. B. J. Kuiper, 96, Dutch scholar in Indology.
- Gene Anthony Ray, 41, American actor, dancer, and choreographer (Fame), complications of a stroke.
- Tim Vigors, 82, British fighter ace during World War II and biographer.

=== 15 ===
- Earl Battey, 68, American baseball player (Chicago White Sox, Washington Senators, Minnesota Twins), cancer.
- Mohamed Choukri, 68, Moroccan author and novelist, cancer.
- Ian Geoghegan, 63, Australian race car driver.
- David Holt, 76, American child actor, heart attack.
- Vyacheslav Lampeyev, 51, Soviet Russian Olympic field hockey player (1980).
- Ray Lewis, 93, Canadian track and field athlete and Olympic medalist (1932).
- Tung-Yen Lin, 91, Chinese-American structural engineer, heart attack.
- Dorothy Loudon, 78, American actress, cancer.
- Mitchell Paige, 85, American-Serbian Marine Corps colonel, heart attack.
- Stavru Teodorov, 72, Romanian Olympic canoeist (1956, 1960).
- Laurence Tisch, 80, American billionaire, head of Loews Corporation and CBS television network, cancer.
- James D. Weaver, 83, American politician (U.S. Representative for Pennsylvania's 24th congressional district).
- Speedy West, 79, American pedal steel guitarist and record producer.
- Ned Wulk, 83, American basketball coach (Arizona State University) and baseball coach.

=== 16 ===
- Fernanda Bullano, 89, Italian sprinter and Olympian (1936).
- Thomas B. Fitzpatrick, 83, American dermatologist.
- Elena Lagorara, 64, Italian Olympic gymnast (1956, 1960).
- Richard Lam, 56, Hong Kong songwriter, lyricist and columnist, lymphoma.
- Bettina Goislard, 29, French UNHCR relief worker, killed by Taliban militants.
- Albert Nozaki, 91, Japanese-American art director (The War of the Worlds, The Ten Commandments).

=== 17 ===
- Gerry Adams, Sr, 77, Irish Republican Army volunteer, father of Gerry Adams.
- Surjit Bindrakhia, 41, Indian singer, cardiac arrest, heart attack.
- Arthur Conley, 57, American soul singer, intestinal cancer.
- Maurice A. Dionne, 67, Canadian educator and politician.
- Don Gibson, 75, American singer-songwriter.
- Bertrand Hallward, 102, British educationalist.
- Colin Harrison, 77, English ornithologist.
- Howard David Hermansdorfer, 72, American district judge (United States District Court for the Eastern District of Kentucky).
- Claude Nicot, 78, French film actor.
- Raymond James Pettine, 91, American district judge (United States District Court for the District of Rhode Island).
- Pete Taylor, 75, American baseball player (St. Louis Browns).

=== 18 ===
- Vivian Bonnell, 79, Antiguan actress (House of Flowers, For Pete's Sake, Ghost, Sanford and Son), diabetes.
- Ken Brett, 55, American baseball player, brother of George Brett, brain cancer.
- Patricia Broderick, 78, American playwright (Infinity) and painter, mother of Matthew Broderick, cancer.
- Bob Carmichael, 63, Australian tennis player and coach.
- Michael Kamen, 55, American composer (Die Hard, Band of Brothers, 101 Dalmatians), heart attack.
- Joseph Ssali, 35, Ugandan Olympic sprinter (1988).

=== 19 ===
- Gillian Barge, 63, English actress (The Cherry Orchard, Measure For Measure, The Winter's Tale), cancer.
- Harry Buffington, 84, American professional football player (Oklahoma State, New York Giants, Brooklyn Dodgers).
- William B. Macomber, Jr., American diplomat and president of The Metropolitan Museum of Art.
- Života Panić, 70, Yugoslav military officer.
- Greg Ridley, 56, English rock artist, complications following pneumonia.
- Claude Roques, 91, French Olympic field hockey player (1936).
- Hans Tabor, 81, Danish diplomat and politician.
- Bill Young, 86, Australian politician (Tasmanian House of Assembly for Franklin).
- Shi Zhecun, 97, Chinese essayist, poet, and short story writer.

=== 20 ===
- Robert Addie, 43, English actor (Excalibur, Robin of Sherwood, Another Country, Dutch Girls, Merlin), lung cancer.
- Pedro Adigue, 60, Filipino boxer and light welterweight world champion .
- Loris Azzaro, 70, French-Italian fashion designer, cancer.
- David Dacko, 73, first president of the Central African Republic, asthma.
- Cowan Hyde, 96, American baseball player.
- Eugene Kleiner, 80, Austrian-American entrepreneur and venture capitalist.
- Ed Reigle, 79, Canadian ice hockey player (Boston Bruins), and coach.
- Mary Jane Russell, 77, American photographic fashion model, pulmonary fibrosis.
- Roger Short, 58, British diplomat, consul-general in Istanbul, homicide.
- Jim Siedow, 83, American actor, pulmonary emphysema.
- Ferry Sonneville, 72, Indonesian badminton player.
- Marek Szczech, 47, Polish footballer.
- Mel West, 64, American football player (Missouri Tigers, Boston Patriots, New York Titans).
- Pedro L. Yap, 85, Filipino judge and Chief Justice of the Supreme Court.
- Kerem Yılmazer, 58, Turkish actor, homicide.

=== 21 ===
- Eşfak Aykaç, 85, Turkish football player and coach.
- Bill Haarlow, 90, American basketball player.
- Pekka Kuvaja, 82, Finnish Olympic cross-country skier (1948, 1952).
- Emil Pažický, 76, Slovak football player.
- Armand Putzeys, 86, Belgian cyclist and Olympic medalist (1936).
- Teddy Randazzo, 68, American singer-songwriter.

=== 22 ===
- Mario Beccaria, 83, Italian politician.
- Iosif Budahazi, 56, Romanian Olympic fencer (1972).
- José Joaquim Cancela, 78, Portuguese Olympic rower (1948).
- Joe Just, 87, American baseball player (Cincinnati Reds).
- Yuri Khukhrov, 71, Russian Soviet realist painter and graphic artist.
- George Peoples, 43, American football player (Dallas Cowboys, New England Patriots, Tampa Bay Buccaneers).
- Al Richardson, 61, British Trotskyist historian and activist.
- Dick Thomas, 88, American singing cowboy, songwriter, and musician.

=== 23 ===
- Patricia Burke, 86, English singer and actress (Lisbon Story, The Day the Fish Came Out, The Clitheroe Kid).
- Nick Carter, 79, New Zealand racing cyclist and Olympian (1948).
- Richard Dogbeh, 70, Beninese novelist and educator.
- Jhalak Man Gandarbha, 68, Nepali folk singer.
- Patrick Jansen, 82, Indian field hockey player and Olympian (1948).
- Johny Lahure, 61, Luxembourgish politician.
- Murasoli Maran, 69, Indian politician.
- Margaret Singer, 82, American clinical psychologist and researcher, pneumonia.
- Bill Strutton, 85, Australian screenwriter and novelist, heart attack.
- Grigori Tokaty, 90, Soviet rocket scientist and politician.

=== 24 ===
- Luai al-Atassi, 76/7, Syrian army commander and politician, President (1963).
- Sheikh Niamat Ali, 63, Bangladeshi film director.
- Saifuddin Azizi, 88, Chinese politician.
- Hesba Fay Brinsmead, 81, Australian author of books for children and young adults (Pastures of the Blue Crane).
- Reiko Dan, 68, Japanese actress.
- Ceferino Estrada, 58, Mexican Olympic cyclist (1976).
- Dick Hutton, 80, American amateur, professional wrestler and Olympian (1948).
- Hugh Kenner, 80, Canadian literary critic.
- Ralph Wilson Nimmons Jr., 65, American district judge (United States District Court for the Middle District of Florida).
- Stefan Ploc, 89, Austrian footballer.
- Michael Small, 64, American film composer (Marathon Man, Klute, The Parallax View), prostate cancer.
- Floquet de Neu, 38-40, Spanish albino western lowland gorilla.
- Warren Spahn, 82, American baseball pitcher (Milwaukee Braves) and member of the MLB Hall of Fame.
- Tun Tun, 80, Indian playback singer and actress-comedienne.

=== 25 ===
- Bernard Cohn, 75, American anthropologist and academic.
- Jacques François, 83, French actor.
- Shulamith Hareven, 73, Israeli writer and essayist.
- Zhang Honggen, 67, Chinese football player and coach.
- Mary Queeny, 90, Lebanese-Egyptian actress and film producer.
- Werner Schweizer, 87, Swiss Olympic rower (1936).

=== 26 ===
- Andrea Bonomi, 80, Italian football player.
- `Alí-Akbar Furútan, 98, Iranian Baháʼí educator and author.
- Sadegh Khalkhali, 77, Iranian Shia cleric and ayatollah, cancer.
- Meyer Kupferman, 77, American composer and clarinetist, heart failure.
- Lionel Ngakane, 75, South African filmmaker and actor (The Mark of the Hawk, The Squeeze).
- Gordon Reid, 64, Scottish actor.
- Soulja Slim, 26, American rapper, homicide.
- Harry Thompson, 77, American football player (Los Angeles Rams, Chicago Cardinals).
- Lise Thomsen, 88, Danish film actress.
- Stefan Wul, 81, French science fiction writer (Oms en série).

=== 27 ===
- Duck Dowell, 91, American basketball player and coach.
- Satyendra Dubey, 30, Indian Engineering Service officer, assassinated.
- Arthur Greenslade, 80, British conductor and arranger for films and television.
- Bob Hohn, 62, American football player (Pittsburgh Steelers).
- Riccardo Malipiero, 89, Italian composer, pianist, critic, and music educator.
- Will Quadflieg, 89, German actor, pulmonary embolism.
- Marjorie Reeves, 98, British historian and educationalist.
- Kurt von Fischer, 90, Swiss musicologist and classical pianist.

=== 28 ===
- Ted Bates, 85, British footballer and manager.
- Harold Von Braunhut, 77, American marketer and creator of Amazing Sea-Monkeys, suicide.
- Armand Cure, 84, American basketball player (Providence Steamrollers).
- Edmund Hartmann, 92, American film and television writer and producer.
- Terry Lester, 53, American actor (The Young and the Restless, Santa Barbara, As the World Turns), heart attack.
- Jóel Sigurðsson, 79, Icelandic Olympic javelin thrower (1948).
- Thekra, 37, Tunisian singer, shot.

=== 29 ===
- Norman Burton, 79, American actor (Diamonds Are Forever, The Towering Inferno, The New Adventures of Wonder Woman), traffic collision.
- Tony Canadeo, 84, American football player (Green Bay Packers) and member of the Pro Football Hall of Fame.
- Jim Carlin, 85, American baseball player (Philadelphia Phillies).
- Jesse Carver, 92, English football player and manager.
- Jan-Magnus Jansson, 81, Finnish politician. chairman of the Swedish People's Party of Finland.
- Larry Latham, 51, American professional wrestler, heart attack.
- Robert Y. Thornton, 93, American attorney, politician, and jurist.
- Rudi Martinus van Dijk, 71, Dutch composer.

=== 30 ===
- Earl Bellamy, 86, American film and television director (Leave It to Beaver, The Lone Ranger, I Spy, M*A*S*H), heart attack.
- Jack Brewer, 85, American baseball player (New York Giants).
- Barber Conable, 81, American politician, president of the World Bank (1986–1991), infectious disease.
- António Jesus Correia, 79, Portuguese football and roller hockey (quad) player.
- Dennis Crane, 58, American football player (USC Trojans, Washington Redskins, New York Giants).
- Gertrude Ederle, 98, American swimmer, first woman to swim the English Channel (1926), and Olympian (1924).
- Hans Kuschke, 89, German rower and Olympic medalist (1936).
- Kin Platt, 91, American writer, artist, painter, sculptor, caricaturist, and comics artist.
- Jens Torstensen, 75, Danish footballer and Olympian (1952).
