= Horace Odell =

American javelin thrower

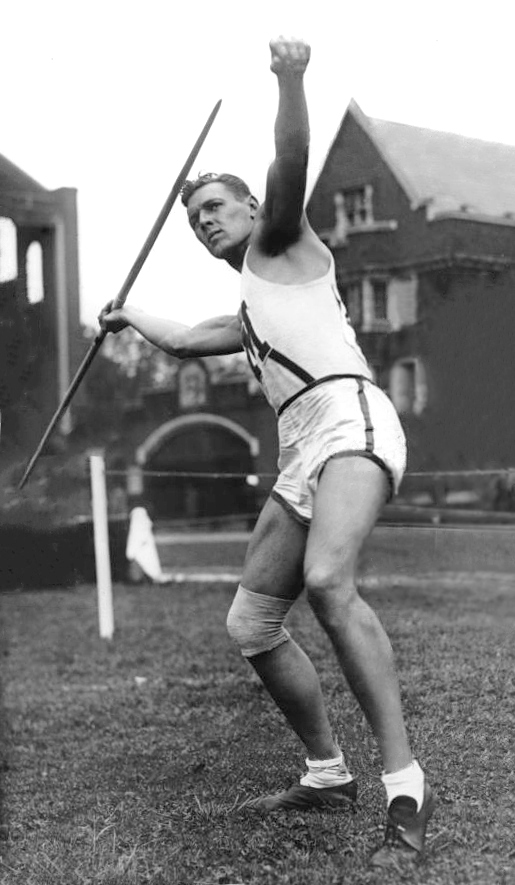
- Odell in 1934

Personal information
- Born: September 5, 1910 Richmond Hill, Queens, U.S.
- Died: January 22, 1984 (aged 73) Venice, Florida, U.S.

Sport
- Sport: Athletics
- Event: Javelin throw

Achievements and titles
- Personal best: 67.64 m (1934)

Horace Paul "Hop" Odell, Jr. (September 5, 1910 – January 22, 1984) was an American javelin thrower. Odell was IC4A champion in 1933 and 1934 and United States champion in 1935.

== Biography ==
Odell was born in the Richmond Hill neighborhood in Queens, New York City. His father, Horace Sr., had a track and field background and had been part of a record-setting Irish American Athletic Club relay team in 1907. The younger Odell represented the New York Athletic Club and Manhattan College, and won the 1933 IC4A javelin throw championship with a throw of 205 ft 1/2 in (62.49 m). He placed third at the national championships later that year. He graduated Manhattan College in 1935.

Odell repeated as IC4A champion in 1934, defeating Stanford's Johnny Mottram, who had been the favorite. The following week, aided by a tailwind, he threw 221 ft 11 in (67.64 m) at the N.Y.A.C. Games; it was the best throw by an American that year, within a foot of James DeMers's American record, and remained a meeting record until 1963. Despite this, Odell only placed fourth at the 1934 national championships and fifth at the NCAA championships.

In 1935 Odell only placed third at the IC4A championships (Mottram won) and fourth at the NCAA meet (Charles Gongloff won), but won his first title at the national championships with a throw of 217 ft 1 5/8 in (66.18 m). Entering 1936, a panel of leading coaches considered Odell likely to qualify for the United States team for the 1936 Summer Olympics. He won at the Eastern Tryouts, a qualifying meet for the final Olympic Trials, with a throw of 213 ft 9 in (65.15 m); in another pre-Trials meet, the national championships (held separately from the Trials for the first time since 1924), he placed second behind Mottram. At the final Trials, however, Odell didn't place in the top six and the three Olympic spots went to Lee Bartlett, Malcolm Metcalf and Alton Terry.

Odell later made a living as a real estate salesman. He died in Venice, Florida in January 1984.
