= Steve Seymour =

American track and field athlete (1920–1973)

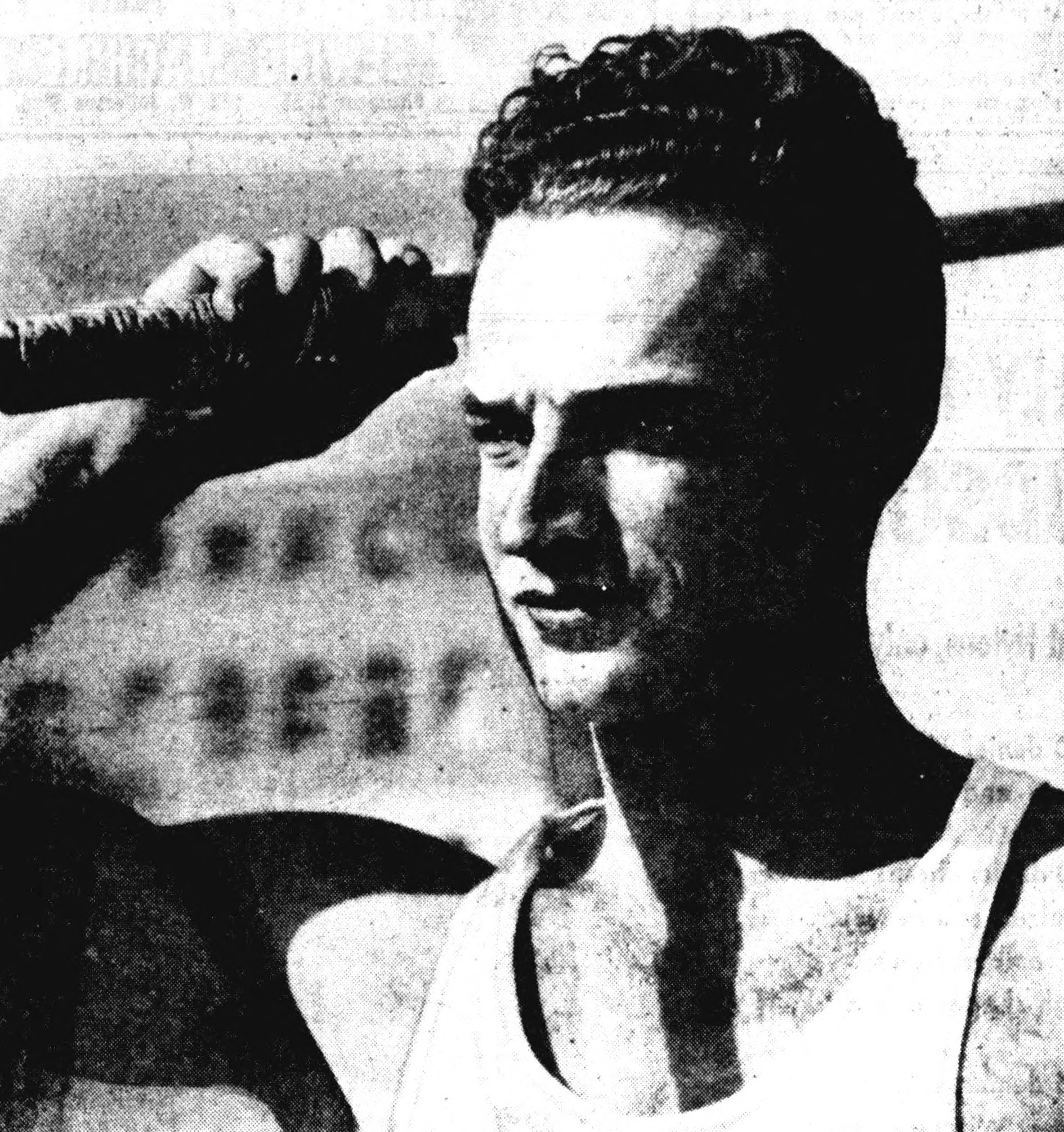
- Seymour, circa 1948

Personal information
- Born: October 4, 1920 New York City, U.S.
- Died: June 18, 1973 (aged 52) Los Angeles, California , U.S.
- Height: 6 ft 1 in (185 cm)
Medal record
Men's athletics
Representing the United States
Olympic Games
Silver medal – second place	1948 London	Javelin throw
Pan American Games
Silver medal – second place	Buenos Aires 1951	Javelin throw

Stephen Andrew Seymour (October 4, 1920 – June 18, 1973) was an American physician and track and field coach and athlete, who in the 1948 London Olympics won America's first silver medal in the javelin throw, a feat that to-date would be repeated only in the 1952 Olympics. Setting the American javelin record in 1945 and 1947, Seymour is regarded by track and field historians as America's original javelin technician.

Seymour, who was of Jewish heritage, was actually born Seymour Cohen in New York, but in his mid-20's changed his name to Stephen Seymour to avoid anti-Semitism.

== Early life and education ==
Seymour threw javelin for his Middletown, Pennsylvania, High School track team, and then for his college team, Franklin and Marshall in Lancaster, setting a school record of 208 feet or 63.4 meters after several years of competition. Around this time he abandoned his side arm delivery and began to use a technique known as the "front cross", which he would maintain and continue to refine. At Franklin and Marshall, he also competed in the pole vault, long jump and ran cross country.

Following the Second World War, performance levels of elite U.S. javelin throwers lagged well behind the Europeans. Since around 1930, Finnish javeliners had primarily dominated the sport, and with over 20 medals they continue to hold the most of any country by a considerable margin.

== 1947 American record ==
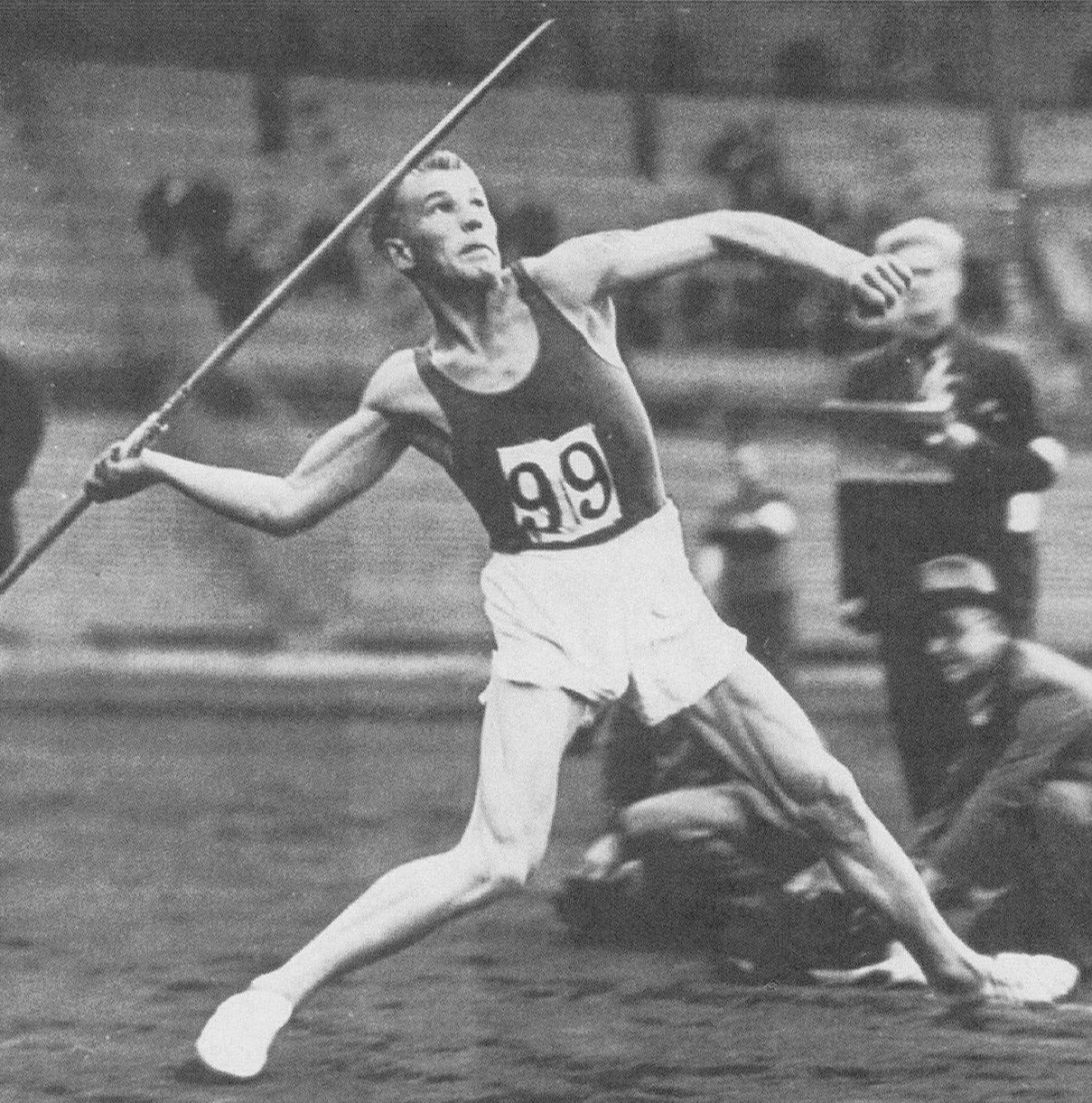
Fin Yrjö Nikkanen, with overhead throw

Seeking to refine his skills, Seymour spent 1946 in Finland, training with that nation's world-class throwers. It did not take long for his meticulous research to pay dividends. Besting his first American record of 235'3" he set in Istanbul while serving overseas as an Army medic in 1945, in 1947 he established a new American record with an exceptional throw of 75.80 meters (248 feet 8 inches) at the U.S. AAU Championships representing the Los Angeles Athletic Club; his mark was within ten feet of the global standard of 78.7 meters (258 feet) set by Finland's Yrjö Nikkanen in 1938.

== Technique ==
Seymour helped improve and popularize a throwing position with more of a straight arm release with the arm over the head and close to vertical at one point. At the beginning of the throw, the head and upper body tilted backward and moved closer to vertical. At release, the arm would be extended overhead and slightly in front of the body, near the top of the arc, with the athlete often looking in the direction of the throw. The javelin may be initially held at an angle exceeding 45 degrees, but released at only around 30 degrees allowing a snap of the wrist and an elbow pivot, but getting most of the force from the shoulders. It was distinct from one earlier Finnish method that used a side arm release. Seymour's method seemed to more effectively use the muscle strength in the arms, shoulders, back and chest to power the throw than a side arm technique. The overhead or over the shoulder throw technique is required today in most competitions. Seymour also was an innovator in the development of strength training techniques specific to the javelin throw. For a period in his prime, Seymour was coached by Dean Cromwell, who had served as the 1936 American Olympic Track Team Coach.

== Medical studies and Army ==
In the 1940s Seymour completed his medical studies at the Los Angeles College of Osteopathic Physicians and Surgeons and in later life practiced as an osteopath in addition to operating a clinic for alcoholics. He won the AAU Junior in 1941, still under the name Seymour Cohen, but changed it not long after. He coached track and attended the Philadelphia College of Osteopathy after college, then transferred to the Los Angeles College of Osteopathy in 1944, and married in June of that year, eventually having three children. In 1945, he served overseas as a medic in WWII, then after completing his internship, served in the army and was stationed for a time in Fort McArthur in Texas. In 1947, he completed his degree in osteopathy.

== 1948 Olympic silver medal ==
1948 was a memorable year in Seymour's career; he won a second consecutive national AAU title, and in his most notable achievement, a silver medal at the Summer Olympics in London. He became the first American to take a silver in the sport, though his winning throw of 67.56 meters (221.7 feet) was shorter than his American record as it was hampered by poor weather and a somewhat overworked and sore elbow. Nonetheless, his medal was one of the first clear indications that American athletes in javelin, if briefly, could break the near monopoly that Finnish and Scandinavian athletes had once held competing at the highest level. Seymour's primary American competitor at the 1948 Olympics was Californian Martin Biles, a former 1940-41 NCAA javelin champion, who had beaten Seymour at least seven times previously, but failed to medal in 1948.

== National championship, Pan Am Games ==
In 1950, Seymour added a third national championship to his collection; and in 1951 he was the silver medalist at the Pan American Games.

=== America briefly excels ===
With a brief show of dominance, and perhaps learning from Seymour's methods and techniques, in 1952 American Javelin athletes would in a very rare occurrence dominate with Cy Young taking the Gold, and Bill Miller the Silver. Swedish and Finnish athletes would continue to hold most world records until 1953, when American Bud Held beat a World Record of 78.7 meters (258 feet) set by Fin Yrjö Nikkanen in 1938. Unable to compete, Seymour took sixth place in the 1952 Olympic finals, and did not qualify for the 1956 Olympic finals.

== Later life and death ==
Seymour wrote a number of articles on the javelin, effectively used strength training, and continued to train in the sport as late as 1957–8. He researched written material on the sport including translations. Continuing to improve his technique a full ten years after his Olympic silver medal, he came up with a throw of 251 ft 1 in (76.53 m) in 1958 to register the longest throw of his career. Seymour advocated the use of somewhat heavier javelins for stronger competitors to provide more thrust. In an article he wrote in "Amateur Athlete", he described the javelin he threw in 1959, as a “double weight”, 3.5 pounds as opposed to the 800 grams (1.8 pounds) javelin, which is still the minimum weight requirement. In 1961 Seymour was the co-ordinating Project Director for a report to President Kennedy, called “The Soft American: Problems and Solutions.” There were 105 people interviewed for the article, including several well-known athletes.

Seymour died of a suspected heart attack in Los Angeles, on June 18, 1973, at the age of 52.
