= Jim Courtright =

Jim Courtright may refer to:

- Jim Courtright (gunman) (1848–1887), American lawman, outlaw and gunfighter
- Jim Courtright (athlete) (1914–2003), Canadian javelin thrower
