= 1938 European Athletics Championships – Men's javelin throw =

Javelin throw

Men's javelin throw at the European Athletics Championships

The men's javelin throw at the 1938 European Athletics Championships was held in Paris, France, at Stade Olympique de Colombes on 3 September 1938.

== Medalists ==
| Gold | Matti Järvinen; Finland |
| Silver | Yrjö Nikkanen; Finland |
| Bronze | József Várszegi; Hungary |

== Results ==
=== Final ===
3 September

| Rank | Name | Nationality | Result | Notes |
|---|---|---|---|---|
| 1st place, gold medalist(s) | Matti Järvinen | Finland | 76.87 | CR |
| 2nd place, silver medalist(s) | Yrjö Nikkanen | Finland | 75.00 | |
| 3rd place, bronze medalist(s) | József Várszegi | Hungary | 72.78 | NR |
| 4 | Gustav Sule | Estonia | 70.50 | |
| 5 | Friedrich Issak | Estonia | 70.23 | |
| 6 | Lennart Atterwall | Sweden | 68.58 | |
| 7 | Gerhard Stöck | Germany | 65.34 | |
| 8 | Oskar Ospelt | Liechtenstein | 58.83 | |
| 9 | Roger Frinot | France | 58.40 | |
| 10 | Raffaele Drei | Italy | 55.98 | |
| 11 | Marc Dore | France | 52.18 | |

== Participation ==
According to an unofficial count, 11 athletes from 8 countries participated in the event.

- Estonia (2)
- Finland (2)
- France (2)
- Germany (1)
- Hungary (1)
- Italy (1)
- Liechtenstein (1)
- Sweden (1)
