= List of people in the Warsaw Uprising =

This is a list of notable individuals who were involved in the Warsaw Uprising, a Polish insurgence during the Second World War that begun on August 1, 1944.

== Polish Home Army (Armia Krajowa) ==
- Krzysztof Kamil Baczyński, poet and Home Army soldier, KIA on August 4
- Gustaw Billewicz, codename Sosna, commander of Battalion 'Chrobry I'
- Tadeusz Bór-Komorowski, codename Generał Bór, highest commander of the Home Army in Poland. During Warsaw Uprising fought in Wola, Stare Miasto and Southern Śródmieście.
- Antoni Chruściel, codename Monter, commander of Home Army Warsaw district (later renamed to Warsaw Home Army Corps - Warszawski Korpus Armii Krajowej); direct commander of Polish forces in Warsaw Uprising.
- Jan Mazurkiewicz, codename Radosław, commander of Group 'Radosław'
- Mieczysław Niedzielski, codename Żywiciel, commander of II Sector: Żoliborz, after September 20 commander of the reconstructed 8th Romuald Traugutt Infantry Division
- Jan Nowak-Jeziorański, the Courier from Warsaw
- Eugeniusz Lokajski - a photographer
- Leopold Okulicki, codename Niedźwiadek, a cichociemni, chief of operations, later also Chief of Staff
- Witold Pilecki, codename Druh, commander of second company of 'Chrobry II' battalion, fought in Northern Śródmieście, commander of the fortified area "Great Bastion of Warsaw"
- Tadeusz Pełczyński, codename Grzegorz, Chief of Staff of Home Army Warsaw district, second in command to Generał Bór. Fought in Starówka and Śródmieście, commanded the second assault on Dworzec Gdański. Wounded on September 9.

== Civilians ==
- Jan Franciszek Czartoryski - chaplain

== Soviet military ==
- Zygmunt Berling, commander of the 1st Polish Army (Wojsko Polskie) in the Soviet armies which was the only "Soviet" group to aid the uprising.
- Konstantin Rokossovsky, commander of the Russian Central Front, including the forces which failed to support the uprising.

== German military ==
- Erich von dem Bach, SS-Obergruppenführer, commander of all troops fighting against the Warsaw Uprising (Korpsgruppe Bach)
- Oskar Dirlewanger, commander of Battle Group Dirlewanger
- Heinz Reinefarth, SS-Gruppenfuhrer, commander of Battle Group Reinefarth
- Günter Rohr, Major General, commander of Battle Group Rohr
- Willy Schmidt, commander of Battle Group Schmidt
- Rainer Stahel, Lieutenant General, commander of Warsaw Garrison
- Bronislav Kaminski, commander of the infamous RONA brigade
