= Konstantinos Metaxas (athlete) =

Greek javelin thrower

Personal information
- Nationality: Greek
- Born: 21 May 1916

Sport
- Sport: Athletics
- Event: Javelin throw

Konstantinos Metaxas (born 21 May 1916, date of death unknown) was a Greek athlete. He competed in the men's javelin throw at the 1936 Summer Olympics.
