= Ibrahim Okasha =

Egyptian javelin thrower

Personal information
- Nationality: Egyptian
- Born: 1911 Cairo, Khedivate of Egypt

Sport
- Sport: Athletics
- Event: Javelin throw

Ibrahim Okasha (born 1911) was an Egyptian athlete. He competed in the men's javelin throw at the 1936 Summer Olympics.
