= Pavol Maľa =

Slovak javelin thrower

Personal information
- Nationality: Czechoslovak
- Born: 17 October 1910 Očová, Austria-Hungary
- Died: 21 October 1970 (aged 60) Trenčianska Teplá, Czechoslovakia

Sport
- Sport: Athletics
- Event: Javelin throw

Pavol Maľa (17 October 1910 – 21 October 1970) was a Czechoslovak athlete. He competed in the men's javelin throw at the 1936 Summer Olympics.
