= Noboru Ueno =

Japanese javelin thrower (born 1917)

Personal information
- Nationality: Japanese
- Born: 8 January 1917

Sport
- Sport: Athletics
- Event: Javelin throw

Noboru Ueno (born 8 January 1917, date of death unknown) was a Japanese track and field athlete.

== Biography ==
Ueno competed in the men's javelin throw at the 1936 Summer Olympics. Ueno is deceased.
