= Oto Jurģis =

Latvian javelin thrower

Personal information
- Nationality: Latvian
- Born: 12 July 1904 Estonia
- Died: 7 October 1973 (aged 69) Riga, Latvian SSR, Soviet Union

Sport
- Sport: Athletics
- Event: Javelin throw
- Club: Marss / Rīgas LBS / RPDSK

Oto Jurģis (12 July 1904 – 7 October 1973) was a Latvian athlete who competed at the 1936 Summer Olympics.

== Biography ==
Jurģis won the British AAA Championships title in the javelin throw event at the 1932 AAA Championships.

At the 1936 Olympic Games, Jurģis competed in the men's javelin throw.
