= Friedrich Gerdes =

German javelin thrower

Personal information
- Nationality: German
- Born: Friedrich August Martin Gerdes; 12 December 1910 Varel, German Empire
- Died: 19 October 1960 (aged 49) Dahlem, West Germany
- Height: 176 cm (5 ft 9 in)
- Weight: 76 kg (168 lb)

Sport
- Sport: Athletics
- Event: Javelin throw

Friedrich Gerdes (12 December 1910 – 19 October 1960) was a German athlete. He competed in the men's javelin throw at the 1936 Summer Olympics. He was killed in 1960 by a motor car accident in Berlin.

== Personal life ==
Gerdes was working as a policeman at the time and he was the German Police Champion in 1939.

== Career ==
Gerdes had reached the finals of the javelin throw at the 1936 Summer Olympic and was placed seventeenth and last. Gerdes never managed to win a German Championship.
