= Pauli Vesterinen =

Finnish javelin thrower

Personal information
- Nationality: Finnish
- Born: 20 November 1923 Kanneljärvi, Finland
- Died: 8 August 2005 (aged 81) Nurmijärvi, Finland

Sport
- Sport: Athletics
- Event: Javelin throw

Pauli Vesterinen (20 November 1923 – 8 August 2005) was a Finnish athlete. He competed in the men's javelin throw at the 1948 Summer Olympics.
