= Kalervo Toivonen =

Finnish javelin thrower

Olympic medal record

Men's athletics

Representing Finland
Bronze medal – third place	1936 Berlin	Javelin throw

Kaarlo Kalervo Toivonen (22 January 1913, Salo – 25 July 2006) was a Finnish athlete who mainly competed in the men's javelin throw during his career.

Toivonen represented Finland at the 1936 Summer Olympics in Berlin, where he threw the javelin 70.72 metres to win the bronze medal. The competition in the javelin throw was extremely close; fellow Finn, Yrjo Nikkanen finished just five centimeters ahead of Toivonen to win the silver medal, and one meter ahead of both Finns was Germany's Gerhard Stöck, who won the gold medal at 71.84 meters.

Both Toivonen and Nikkanen had been ahead of Gerhard Stöck through four rounds of throwing; then in round five, Stöck came through with his gold medal-winning performance.
