= Rudolf Markušić =

Croatian javelin thrower (1911–1945)

Personal information
- Nationality: Croatian
- Born: 4 February 1911 Pula, Austria-Hungary
- Died: 23 December 1945 (aged 34)

Sport
- Sport: Athletics
- Event: Javelin throw

Rudolf Markušić (4 February 1911 – 23 December 1945) was a Croatian athlete. He competed in the men's javelin throw at the 1936 Summer Olympics, representing Yugoslavia.
