= Gunnar Petersson =

Swedish javelin thrower

Karl Gunnar Petersson
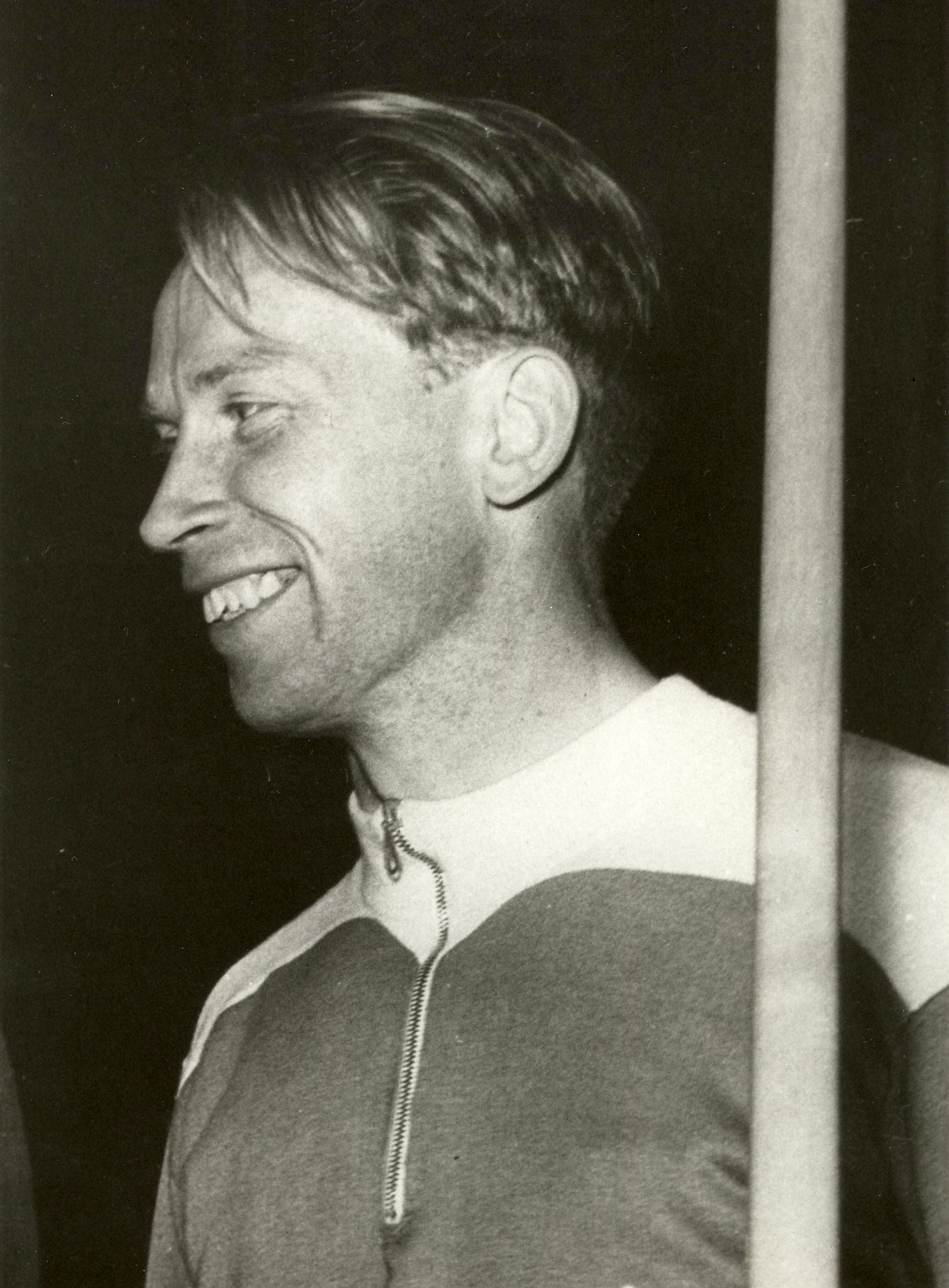

Personal information
- Born: 10 October 1915 Chicago, Illinois, United States
- Died: 4 July 2003 (aged 87) Växjö, Sweden

Sport
- Sport: Athletics
- Event: Javelin throw
- Club: IFK Växjö

Achievements and titles
- Personal best: 72.77 m (1947)

Karl Gunnar "Växjö-Pelle" Petersson (10 October 1915 – 4 July 2003) was a Swedish javelin thrower. He competed at the 1948 Summer Olympics and finished in ninth place.
