= Alton Terry =

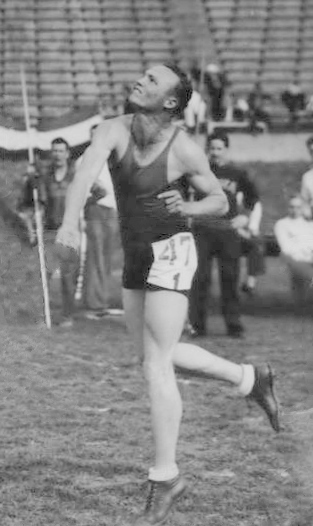
- Terry in 1936

Personal information
- Born: November 24, 1912 Brady, Texas, U.S.
- Died: July 13, 2003 (aged 90) Houston, Texas, U.S.
- Height: 180 cm (5 ft 11 in)
- Weight: 79 kg (174 lb)

Sport
- Sport: Athletics
- Event: Javelin throw
- Club: Hardin-Simmons College

Achievements and titles
- Personal best: 69.85 m (1937)

Floy Alton Terry (November 24, 1912 – July 13, 2003) was an American javelin thrower. He placed sixth at the 1936 Olympics and third in at the 1937 AAU championships.

Competing for Hardin-Simmons, Terry won the 1936 NCAA Championships with a meet-record 226-2 (68.94) to win by over 16 feet. The meet record stood until 1952.
