= József Várszegi =

Hungarian javelin thrower (1910–1977)

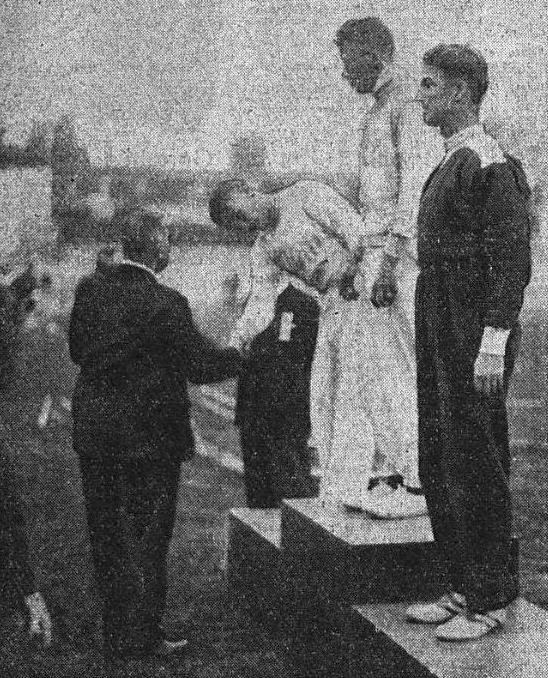
- József Várszegi (right) on the podium of the 1938 European Championships.

Personal information
- Full name: József Várszegi
- Nationality: Hungarian
- Born: 7 September 1910 Győr, Kingdom of Hungary, Austria-Hungary
- Died: 12 June 1977 (aged 66) Budapest, Hungary

Sport
- Country: Hungary
- Sport: Javelin throw

Achievements and titles
- Personal best: 72.78 m (1938)
Medal record
Men's athletics
Representing Hungary
Olympic Games
Bronze medal – third place	1948 London	Javelin throw
European Championships
Bronze medal – third place	1938 Paris	Javelin throw
International University Games
Gold medal – first place	1933 Turin	Javelin Throw
Gold medal – first place	1947 Paris	Javelin Throw
Silver medal – second place	1937 Paris	Javelin Throw

József Várszegi (also known as József Vennesz; 7 September 1910 – 12 June 1977) was a Hungarian athlete who competed in the javelin throw. Among his best results are a European Championships bronze medal from 1938 and an Olympic Games bronze from 1948. Várszegi won the Hungarian national championships a record 20 times between 1932 and 1952 and also broke the Hungarian national record six times during his career.

== Biography ==
Várszegi was born in Győr and began to do athletics in local clubs Dunántúli AC and Győri AC. An all-around athlete in his youth, he competed both in running and throwing events, achieving his best results in javelin throw. In 1930 he won the national high school championships with a competition record of 52.22 metres. Later he went to study on the University of Physical Education in Budapest.

His first major results came at International University Games, winning the javelin throw event in 1933 and finishing second in 1937. In addition he earned a sixth place in 1935. He also won the unofficial, German-led 1939 International University Games.

He participated at his first European Championships in 1934, coming fifth with a distance of 65.81 metres. Four years later he finished third in the same event thanks to throw of 72.78 metres, with that he set a new national record which was broken only 17 years later.

In 1936 Várszegi was present at the Olympic Games, where although he came through the qualifying round with the best result (69.7 meters), he did not manage to go anywhere near that distance in the final and eventually finished eighth. In the next decade due to the World War II there were no other major events held, however, the Hungarian Athletics Championships were not interrupted and took place in every year. Várszegi, who was unbeatable since 1932, extended his run during this period and won a total of 20 national titles until 1952, making him the most successful javelin thrower in the competition history.

Várszegi did not participate at the 1946 European Championships, however, in the next year he competed at International University Games and won the gold medal for the second time after his success in 1933. The best achievement of Várszegi's career came in 1948, when at the Olympic Games in London he won the bronze medal in the javelin throw.

His last major event was the 1952 Summer Olympics in Helsinki at the age of 41. Várszegi failed to advance to the final round after he could not hit the qualifying limit of 64 metres and finished 23rd overall.

After retirement from professional sport, Várszegi became a coach and worked for Vasas SC and Budapest Honvéd SE. He died in Budapest in 1977.
