= Lumír Kiesewetter =

Czech javelin thrower

Personal information
- Nationality: Czech
- Born: 27 September 1919 Litomyšl, Czechoslovakia
- Died: 14 April 1973 (aged 53)

Sport
- Sport: Athletics
- Event: Javelin throw

Lumír Kiesewetter (27 September 1919 – 14 April 1973) was a Czech athlete. He competed in the men's javelin throw at the 1948 Summer Olympics.
