= Walter Turczyk =

Polish javelin thrower

Personal information
- Nationality: Polish
- Born: 26 December 1909 Siemianowice, German Empire
- Died: 19 October 1976 (aged 66) Celle, Germany

Sport
- Sport: Athletics
- Event: Javelin throw

Walter Turczyk (26 December 1909 – 19 October 1976) was a Polish athlete. He competed in the men's javelin throw at the 1936 Summer Olympics.
