= Rudolf Schönbeck =

German footballer

Personal information
- Date of birth: 3 August 1919
- Date of death: 6 November 2003 (aged 84)
- Position: Goalkeeper

Senior career*
Years	Team	Apps	(Gls)
- VfB Königsberg
- Itzehoer SV 09
- FC St. Pauli

International career
1952	Germany		
- * Club domestic league appearances and goals

Rudolf Schönbeck (3 August 1919 – 6 November 2003) was a German footballer who played as a goalkeeper for VfB Königsberg, Itzehoer SV 09 and FC St. Pauli. He also competed in the 1952 Summer Olympics.
