= Eugeniusz Lokajski =

Polish javelin thrower, gymnast, and photographer

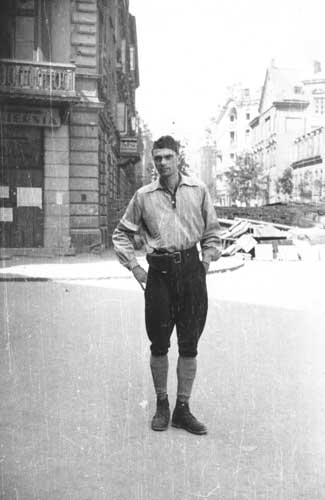
- Lokajski during the Warsaw Uprising

Personal information
- Full name: Eugeniusz Zenon Lokajski
- Born: 14 December 1908 Warsaw, Congress Poland, Russian Empire
- Died: 25 September 1944 (aged 35) Warsaw, General Government
- Height: 1.81 m (5 ft 11 in)

Gymnastics career
- Discipline: Men's artistic gymnastics
- Club: KS Warszawianka

Eugeniusz Zenon Lokajski (14 December 1908 – 25 September 1944) was a Polish athlete, gymnast and photographer. He is notable as the Champion of Poland in javelin throw and the creator of more than 1000 photos documenting the Warsaw Uprising.

== Biography ==
Eugeniusz Lokajski was born in 1908 in Warsaw. In 1924 he joined the Warszawianka sports club, where he started training in a variety of disciplines, including swimming, running and football. Initially he wanted to join the javelin section, but was refused by the coach. In 1928 he passed his baccalaureate exams at the Mikołaj Rej lyceum and served the obligatory service in the Polish Army. After graduating from the reserve NCO school in Zambrów, Lokajski joined the Central Sport Education Centre in Bielany, Warsaw.

In 1932 he returned to KS Warszawianka and became one of the most notable athletes of that club. Successful in hurdling, long jump, high jump and decathlon, he was finally admitted to the javelin section. In 1934 he became Champion of Poland in javelin throw and in gymnastics, which he achieved also the following year. His 1936 javelin record (73.27 metres, established during a duel with Walter Turczyk of Poznań) was not beaten until 17 years later, long after his death.

At the time, it was the third best record in the world. In 1935 he was a member of the Polish team to the World Student Games in Budapest and won the silver medal for javelin throw. He took part in the 1936 Summer Olympics in Berlin. However, during training he suffered an injury of the scapula muscle, which made his results much worse. His result (66,36 m) gave him seventh place. After the Olympics it turned out that the injury was a serious one and it ended his sports career.

In 1937 he briefly appeared in the Poland national team and was appointed to the Polish team for the 1940 Summer Olympics in Tokyo, but then he finally withdrew from sports life and had to spend several months in various hospitals. Also, an ear disease resulted in a series of surgical operations, one of them resulting in skull trepanation.

Conscripted into the Polish Army for the Polish Defensive War of 1939, Lokajski served as a platoon commander in the Polish 35th Infantry Regiment. After the Battle of Brześć he was taken prisoner of war by the Soviets, but managed to escape to Warsaw, which most probably saved him from the fate of other Polish officers, murdered by the Soviets in the Katyn Massacre. In Warsaw he reunited with his family and opened a photographic shop. At the same time he served as a teacher in one of the underground universities operating secretly in Warsaw. After his brother, Józef Lokajski, was killed by the Germans, Eugeniusz took over his duties in the Armia Krajowa unit, where he started serving as the person responsible for arms and munitions transport. There he served with distinction as lieutenant Brok (his nom de guerre).

After the outbreak of the Warsaw Uprising, both Lokajski and his sister joined the Koszta company, the staff defense unit defending the commanders of the Śródmieście area. The commander of his unit, Stefan Mich Kmita knew Lokajski from before the war and decided to use his photographical talents and provided him with a camera, with which Eugeniusz Lokajski started to document the fate of the Warsaw Uprising. Throughout the 63 days of the Uprising, Lokajski made more than a thousand of pictures, each of priceless value for historians. After 30 August, when the Polish forces were short of professional officers, Lokajski was attached to the 2nd platoon of the Koszta company as its commanding officer. Among the most notable skirmishes his unit took part in was the ill-fated attempt to join the forces fighting in the Warsaw's Old Town with those fighting in the city centre. His unit was the only one to successfully reach the specified area of operations, but it was withdrawn due to failure of other units to achieve their goals.

After the action, Lokajski's unit was withdrawn to the rear and became the tactical reserve of the HQ, used for filling the gaps in Polish lines. Among the most serious fights he took part in was the struggle for the barricades on Chmielna street, as well as for the Main Post Office, in which he managed to retake the lost building and capture 18 German prisoners of war. Although his unit was decimated and cut out in the ruins without supplies, food and ammunition, Lokajski held out with his men until a relief force arrived – 48 hours later. By the end of the Uprising, on 25 September 1944, Lokajski was attached to the Headquarters of the Armia Krajowa as a photographer. His main task was to prepare photos of important AK soldiers for fake German documents, which would allow them to evade captivity and continue the struggle. Lacking materials, Lokajski went to a photographic shop at Marszałkowska street 129. Caught in an artillery barrage, he was killed in the ruins of the house. It was not until May 1945 that his body was exhumed from the rubble and buried in the Powązki Cemetery, among other Polish sportsmen killed in World War II. After the war a collection of photos documenting the Uprising was found in Warsaw, well hidden in one of the ruined houses.

His collection of 840 photographs documenting the Uprising, along with some taken by him before the War, was published on 4 February 2008 in a 500-page album through the joint effort of his sister Zofia Domańska and the Warsaw Uprising Museum.

There is a street named after him in Warsaw's borough of Ursynow.

== Image gallery ==
Some of the images of the Lokajski's archive:

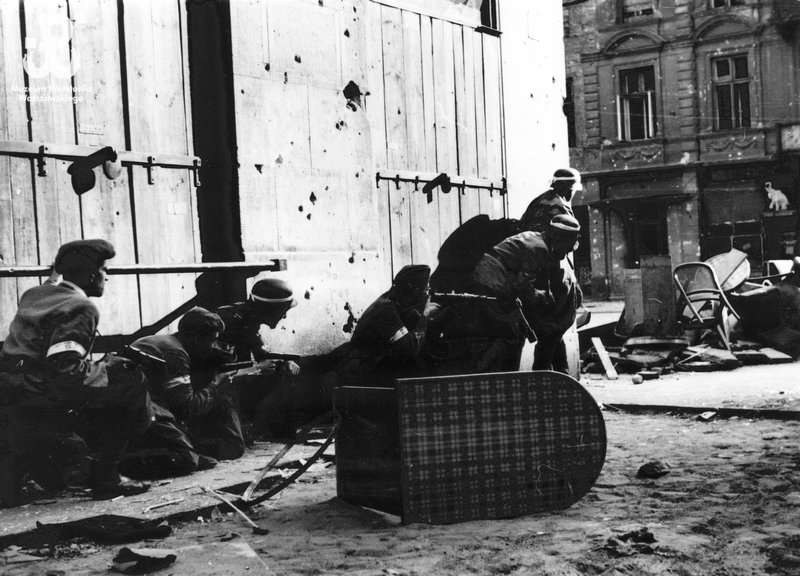
Home Army soldiers preparing for an assault

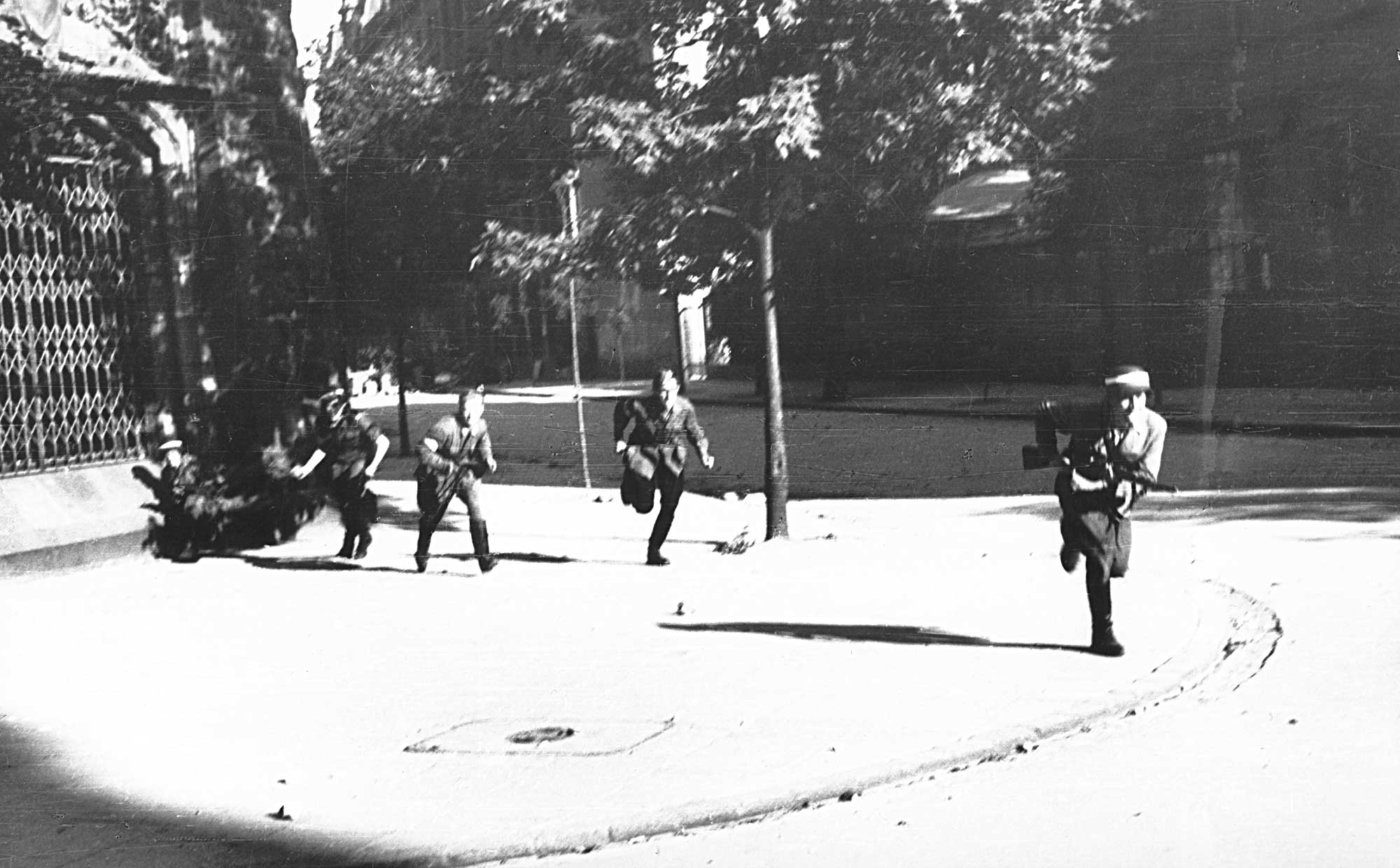
Assault

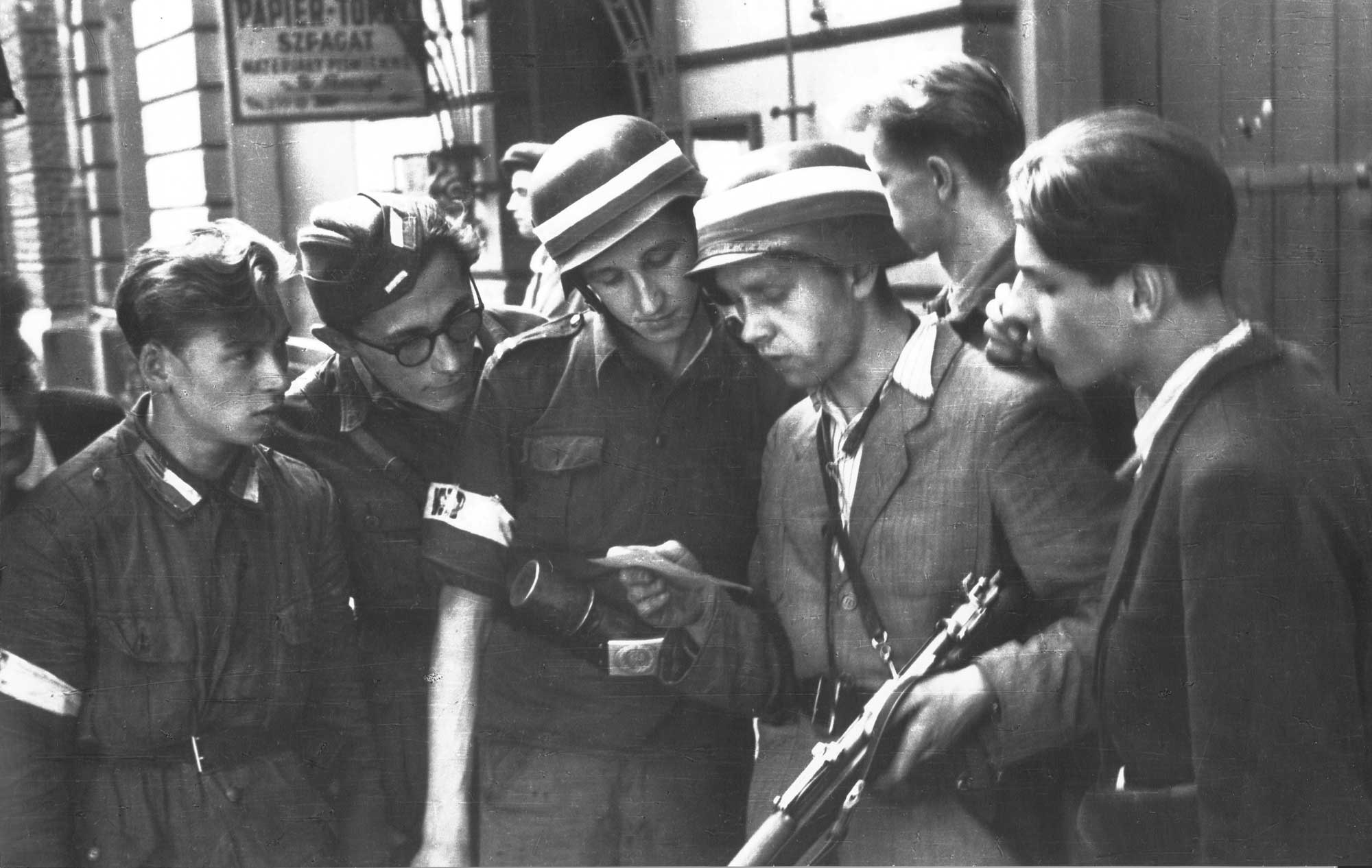
Polish soldiers reading a German leaflet during the Warsaw Uprising

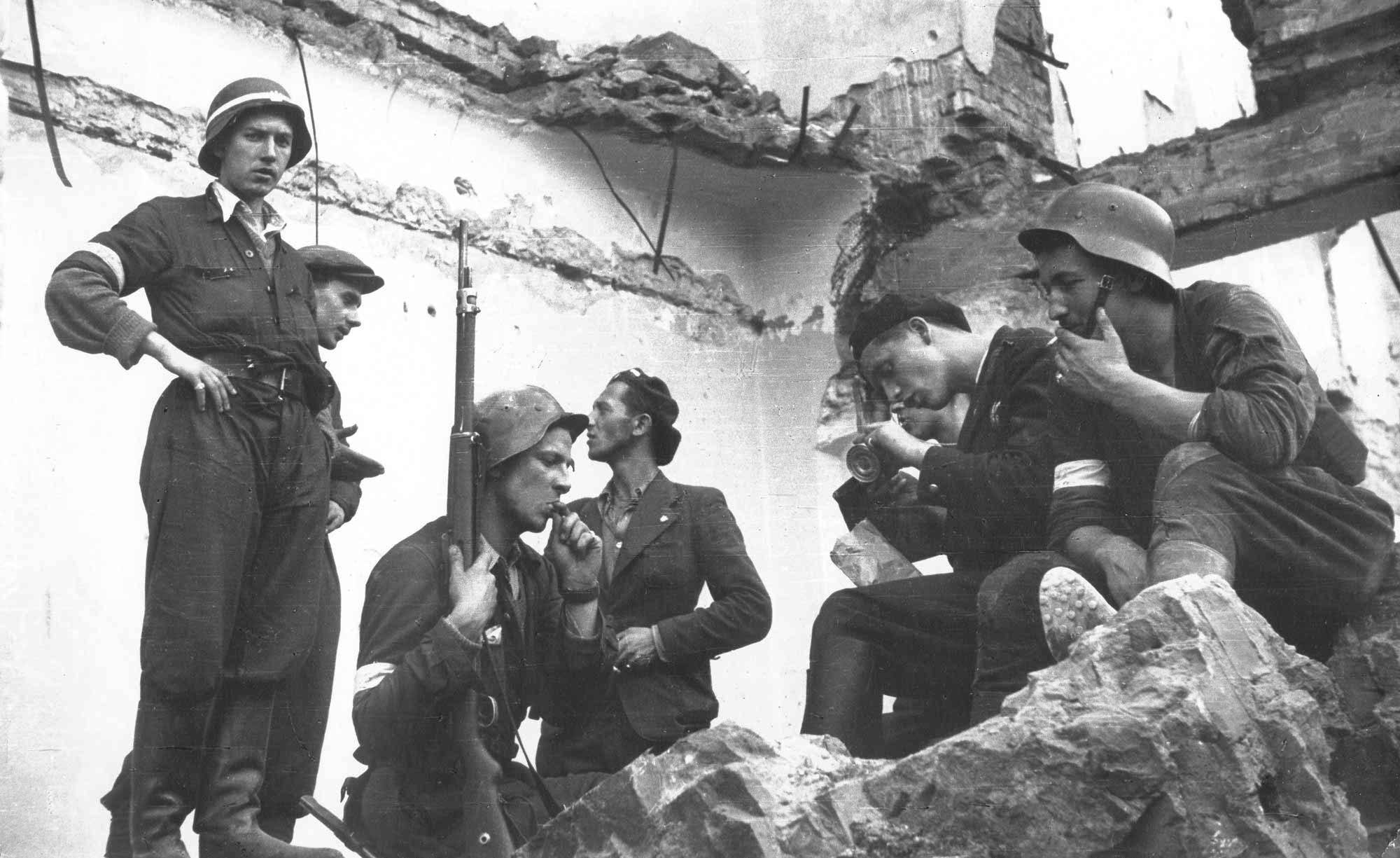
After the battle

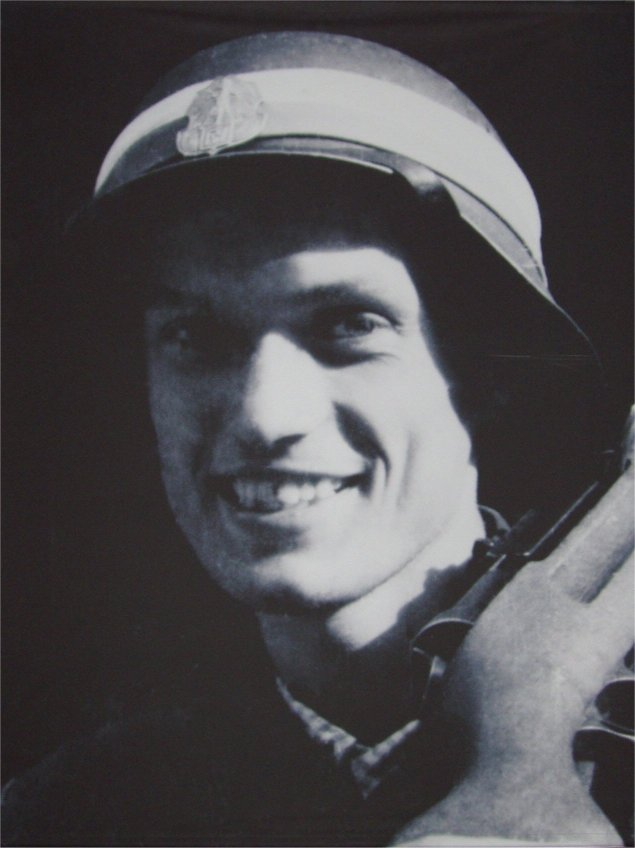
Portrait of Jerzy Tyczyński

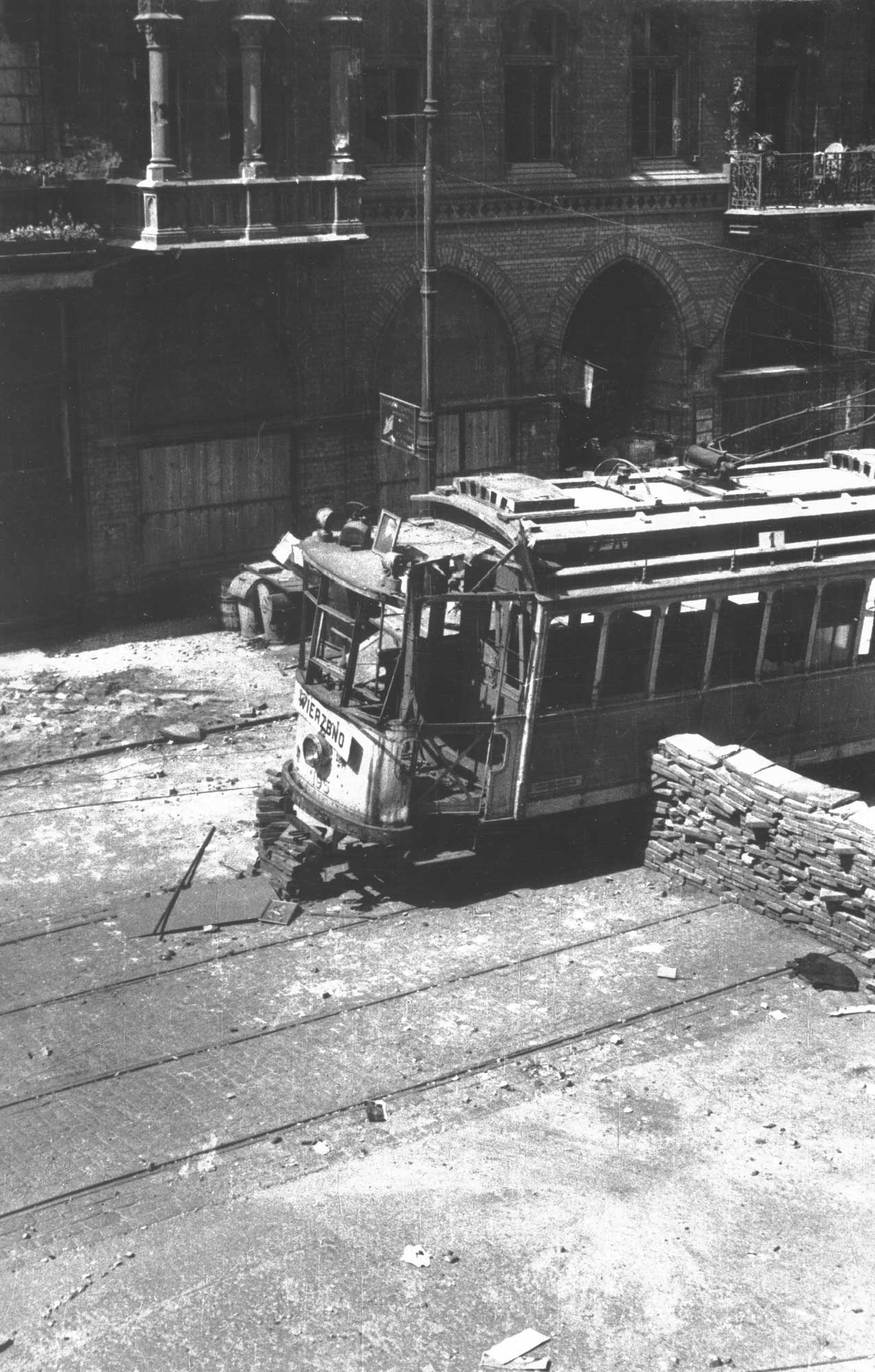
Marszałkowska street

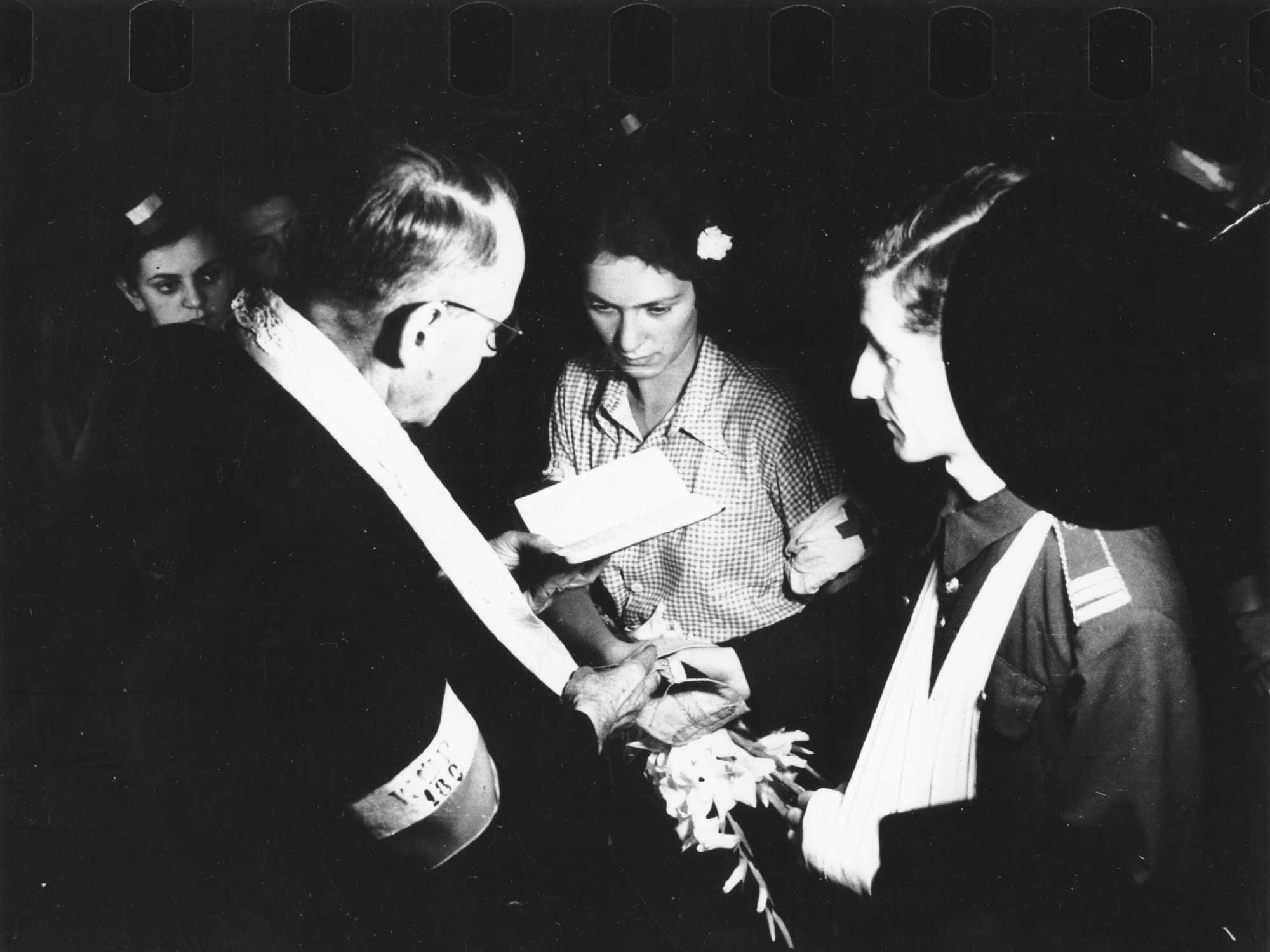
Marriage

== Sources ==
- Uprising Museum page (in Polish)
- Brok: Eugeniusz Lokajski 1908–1944, a Reporter (an album of Eugeniusz Lokajski's photographs documenting the Warsaw Uprising) – ISBN 9788360142073, Warsaw 2007
