= Sven Daleflod =

Swedish javelin thrower

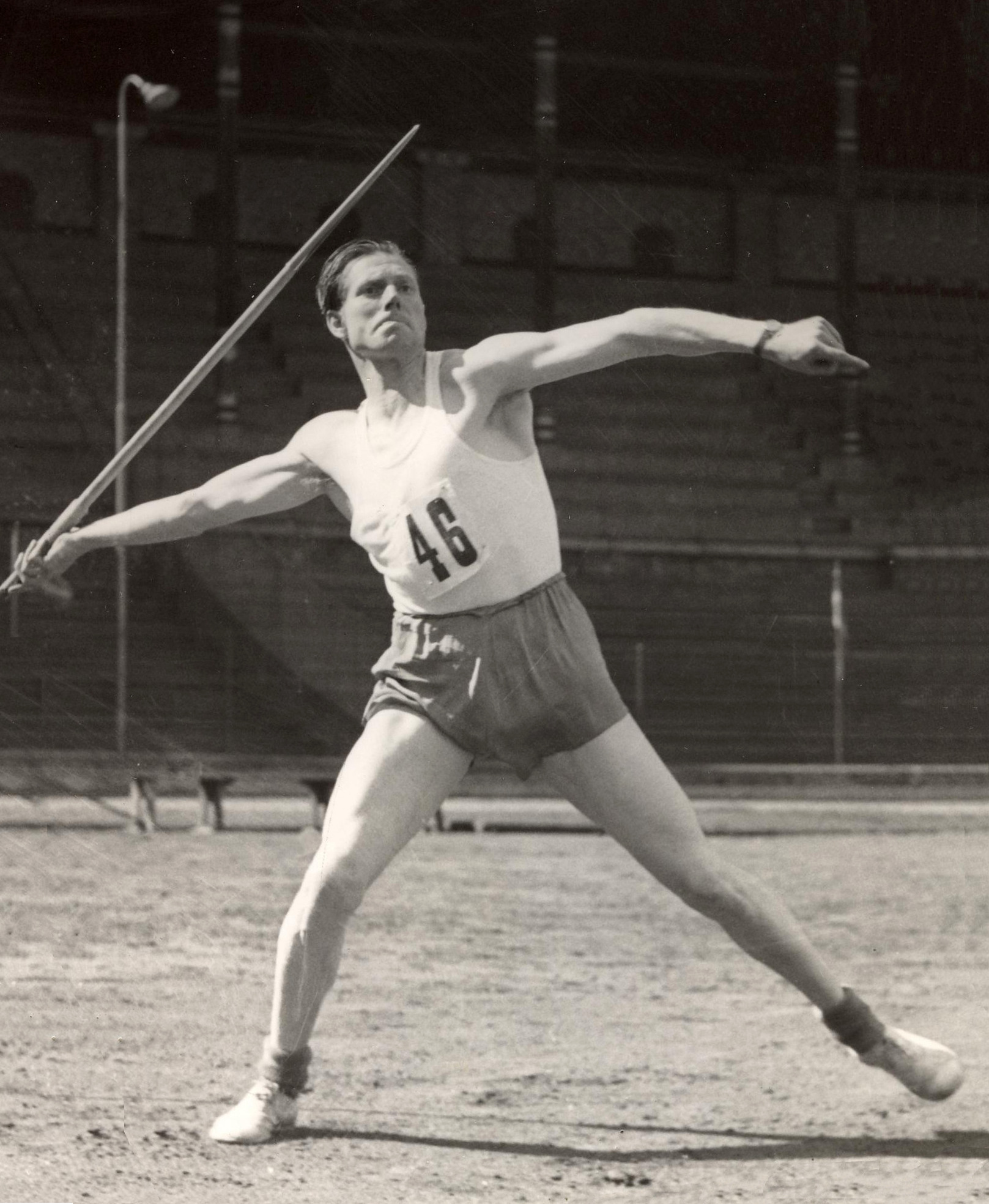

Personal information
- Born: 5 December 1919 Dala-Floda, Sweden
- Died: April 2009 (aged 89)
- Height: 181 cm (5 ft 11 in)
- Weight: 82 kg (181 lb)

Sport
- Sport: Athletics
- Event: Javelin throw
- Club: Dala-Floda IF

Achievements and titles
- Personal best: 73.93 m (1945)

Sven Daleflod (born Eriksson, 5 September 1919 – April 2009) was a Swedish javelin thrower who won four consecutive Swedish titles in 1942–45. He competed at the 1946 European Championships and placed fifth. He qualified for the 1948 Olympics, but had to withdraw due to a chickenpox infection.
