= Jim Courtright (athlete) =

Canadian javelin thrower (1914–2003)

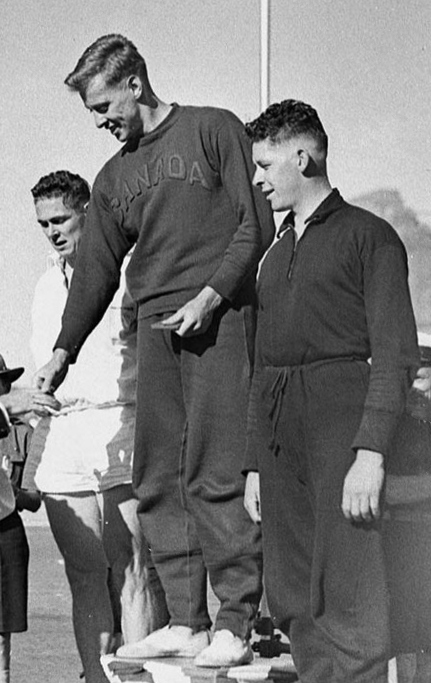
- Courtright (center) at the 1938 British Empire Games

Personal information
- Born: December 16, 1914 North Bay, Ontario, Canada
- Died: February 21, 2003 (aged 88) Kingston, Ontario, Canada
- Height: 190 cm (6 ft 3 in)
- Weight: 80 kg (176 lb)

Sport
- Sport: Athletics
- Event(s): Javelin throw, shot put, discus throw

Achievements and titles
- Personal best(s): JT – 66.31 m (1936); SP – 12.1 m (1938)
Medal record
Representing Canada
British Empire Games
Gold medal – first place	1938 Sydney	Javelin throw

James Milton Courtright (December 16, 1914 – February 21, 2003) was a Canadian track and field athlete and Vice Principal of Queen's University. His athletic career included participating in the 1936 Summer Olympics in Berlin, Germany, and the 1938 British Empire Games (now the Commonwealth Games) in Sydney, Australia, where he captured the gold medal in the javelin throw.

== Early life ==
Courtright was born in North Bay, Ontario, Canada, where his father worked as a civil engineer. He was the second of five children with an older sister, Celina, and three younger brothers, George, Joseph, and Homer. His brother George became a priest, while his two younger brothers both died fighting for the Canadian Forces during World War II. As a teenager his family moved to Ottawa, Ontario, where he attended Glebe Collegiate Institute, and later, the University of Ottawa where he received a bachelor of arts. After completing his degree at U of O he enrolled at Queen's University in Kingston, Ontario, where he received a degree in Applied Science in 1941 and would later return as a Vice Principal.

== Athletic career ==
It was during his time living in Ottawa that Courtright became extremely active in sports. He became a star athlete in high school, playing on the football, basketball, and track and field team. While attending the University of Ottawa Courtright began to develop his skills as a world class javelin thrower. In 1934 he ranked third in Canada, in 1935 he had improved to second and by 1936 he was the Canadian javelin champion. At the same time he continued to play varsity football, basketball, and competed in many of the other track and field events. It was his success at the javelin that provided him with a spot on the 1936 Canadian Olympic Team. Despite making it through to the final round, Courtright finished 14th in the javelin throw event.

Following the Olympics Courtright competed in the 1937 Pan-American Exposition Games (a precursor to the Pan American Games) in Dallas, Texas, where he captured the gold medal in the javelin throw. That year he captured the Canadian intercollegiate championship for the shot put and retained his title in the javelin.

The next year Courtright was chosen to represent Canada in his final international tournament, the 1938 British Empire Games, in the javelin, shot put, and discus. While he managed a 9th-place finish in the discus and a 7th-place finish in the shot put, Courtright came through to capture the gold in his best event, the javelin.
