= Marek Szczech =

Polish footballer

Personal information
- Date of birth: 18 September 1956
- Place of birth: Pisz, Poland
- Date of death: 20 November 2003 (aged 47)
- Height: 1.84 m (6 ft 0 in)
- Position: Goalkeeper

Senior career*
Years	Team	Apps	(Gls)
1973–1974	Mazur Pisz		
1974–1975	Stomil Olsztyn		
1975–1988	Pogoń Szczecin	223	(0)

International career
1987	Poland	2	(0)
- * Club domestic league appearances and goals

Marek Szczech (18 September 1956 – 20 November 2003) was a Polish footballer who played as a goalkeeper.

He earned two caps for the Poland national team in 1987.
