= Odd Mæhlum =

Norwegian javelin thrower

Odd Mæhlum (8 October 1921 – 5 July 2011) was a Norwegian javelin thrower who represented Hamar IL.

At the 1948 Summer Olympics he finished fifth in the javelin final with a throw of 65.32 metres. He finished fourth at the 1946 European Championships in Athletics. He became Norwegian champion from 1946 to 1949.

His personal best throw was 69.08 metres (old type), achieved in September 1947 in Vikersund.
