= Yrjö Nikkanen =

Finnish javelin thrower (1914–1985)

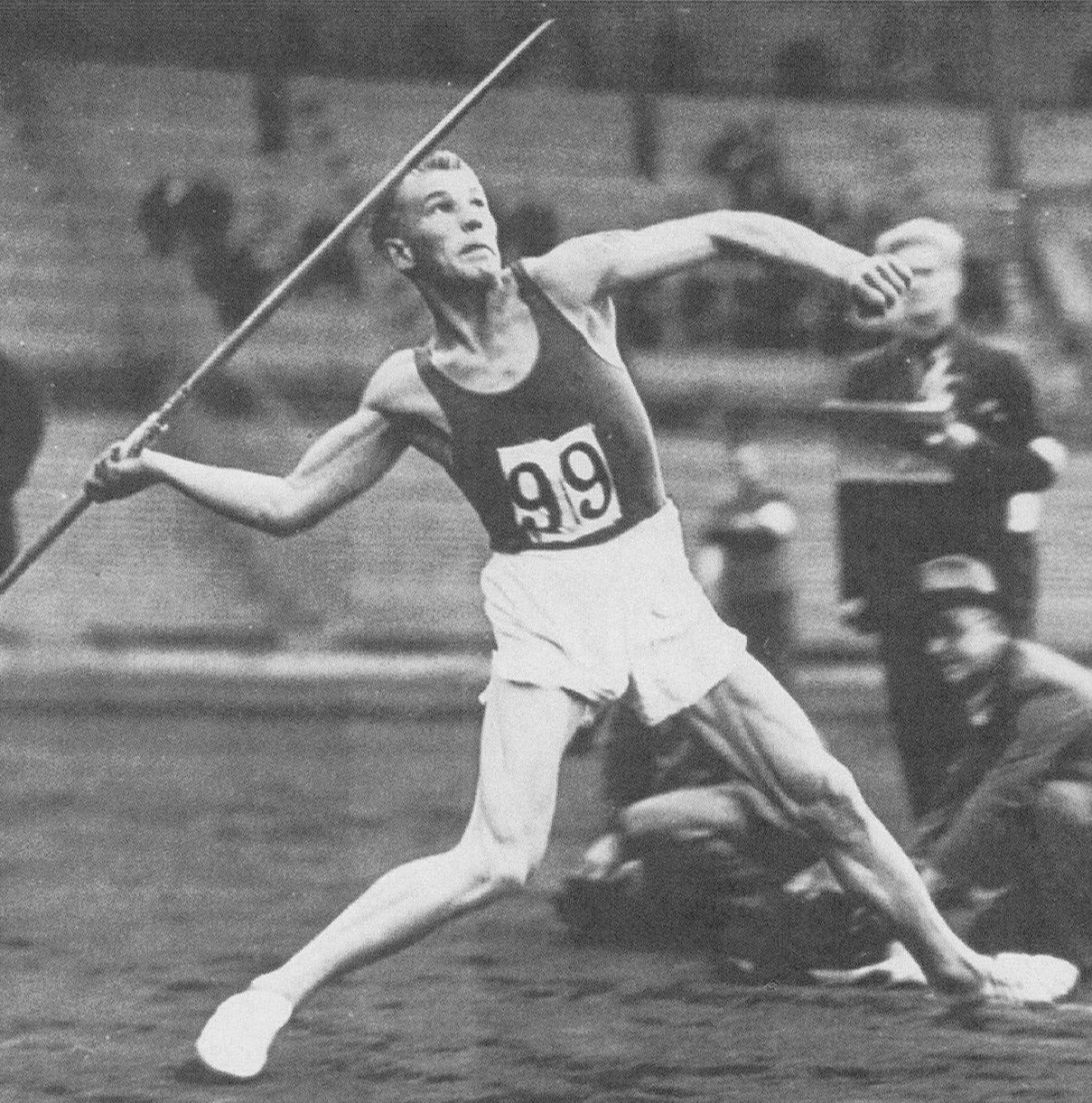

Personal information
- Born: 31 December 1914 Kanneljärvi, Finland
- Died: 18 November 1985 (aged 70) Suoniemi, Finland
- Height: 1.82 m (6 ft 0 in)
- Weight: 77 kg (170 lb)

Sport
- Sport: Athletics
- Club: Pölläkkälän Ura

Achievements and titles
- Personal best: 78.70 m (1938)
Medal record
Men's athletics
Representing Finland
Olympic Games
Silver medal – second place	1936 Berlin	Javelin throw
European Championships
Silver medal – second place	1938 Paris	Javelin throw
Silver medal – second place	1946 Oslo	Javelin throw

Jouko Yrjö Nikkanen (31 December 1914 – 18 November 1985) was a Finnish javelin thrower, who won a silver medal at the 1936 Summer Olympics. His best throw of 70.77 meters was only one meter behind that of the gold medalist Gerhard Stöck, and just five centimeters ahead that of Kalervo Toivonen.

On 25 August 1938, Nikkanen set a world record at 77.87 meters; less than two months later, on 16 October 1938, he had improved his record to 78.70 m. Nikkanen's record was bettered only on 8 August 1953 by Bud Held.
