= Pierre Sprécher =

French decathlete

Personal information
- Nationality: French
- Born: 9 November 1921 Amiens, France
- Died: 7 November 2003 (aged 81)

Sport
- Sport: Athletics
- Events: Javelin throw Decathlon

Pierre Sprécher (9 November 1921 – 7 November 2003) was a French athlete. He competed in the men's javelin throw and the men's decathlon at the 1948 Summer Olympics.
