= Nico Lutkeveld =

Dutch javelin thrower

Personal information
- Born: 9 September 1916 Amsterdam, the Netherlands
- Died: 14 December 1997 (aged 81) Amsterdam, the Netherlands

Sport
- Sport: Javelin throw
- Club: APGS, Amsterdam

Nicolaas Bernardus "Nico" Lutkeveld (9 September 1916 – 14 December 1997) was a Dutch javelin thrower. He competed at the 1948 Summer Olympics and finished in 16th place. He was eights at the 1946 and 1950 European Athletics Championships.

He was a national champion in 1938–1940, 1942, 1943, 1946–1951, 1953 and 1954. In 1935 he became the first Dutch athlete to cross the 60 m barrier, and by 1939 he raised the national record to 67.12 m.

Lutkeveld won the British AAA Championships title in the javelin throw event at the 1946 AAA Championships.

Awards
Preceded by Wim Slijkhuis	KNAU Cup; 1951	Succeeded by Puck Brouwer
