= Martin Biles =

American javelin thrower

Martin Broomall Biles (March 30, 1919 – August 25, 2017) was an American javelin thrower who competed in the 1948 Summer Olympics. He was born in San Diego, California.

Competing for the California Golden Bears, Biles won the 1940 and 1941 NCAA Championships in the javelin, becoming the third two-time winner in the event. In 1942, his younger brother, Bob, won the NCAA title while also competing for the team.
