= Lennart Atterwall =

Swedish javelin thrower (1911–2001)

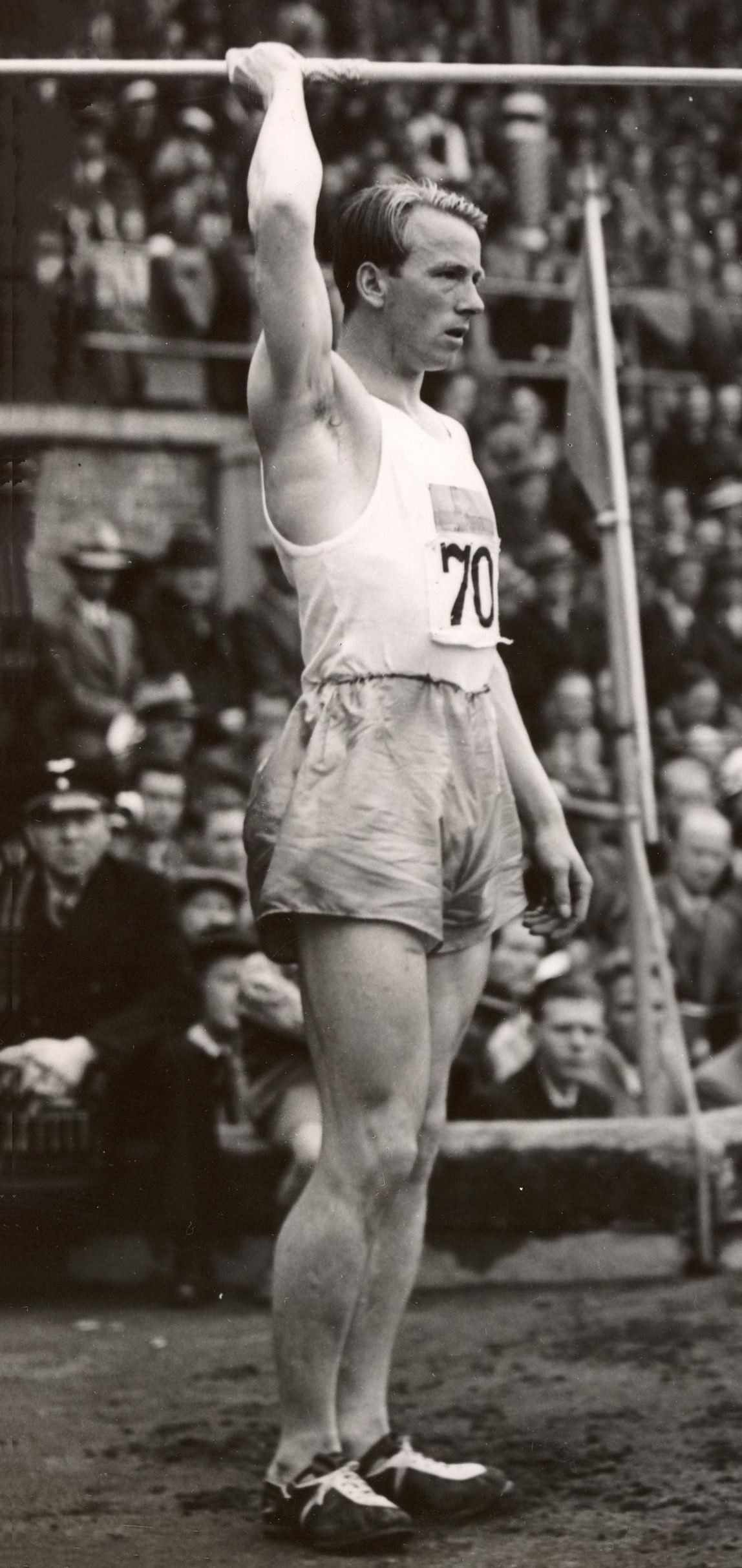

Personal information
- Born: 26 March 1911 Perstorp, Sweden
- Died: 23 April 2001 (aged 90) Sjöbo, Sweden
- Height: 1.82 m (6 ft 0 in)
- Weight: 86 kg (190 lb)

Sport
- Sport: Athletics
- Events: Javelin throw, decathlon
- Club: IFK Knislinge

Achievements and titles
- Personal bests: JT – 75.10 m (1937); Dec – 6268 (1940)
Medal record
Men's athletics
Representing Sweden
European Championships
Gold medal – first place	1946 Oslo	Javelin throw

Lennart Folke Alfons Atterwall (born Ohlsson, 26 March 1911 – 23 April 2001) was a Swedish javelin thrower who competed at the 1936 Summer Olympics.

== Biography ==
Atterwall won the British AAA Championships title in the javelin throw event at the 1935 AAA Championships.

At the 1936 Olympic Games in Berlin, Atterwall finished fourth in the javelin.

He won the European title in 1946. Atterwall held Swedish titles in the javelin throw (1934–35, 37–41 and 1946), pentathlon (1937) and decathlon (1940).
