= Malcolm Metcalf =

American javelin thrower

Personal information
- Nationality: American
- Born: October 16, 1910 Springfield, Massachusetts, U.S.
- Died: May 5, 1993 (aged 82) Claremont, California, U.S.

Sport
- Sport: Athletics
- Event: Javelin throw

Malcolm Metcalf (October 16, 1910 – May 5, 1993) was an American athlete. He competed in the men's javelin throw at the 1932 Summer Olympics and the 1936 Summer Olympics.
