= Jóel Sigurðsson =

Icelandic javelin thrower

Personal information
- Nationality: Icelandic
- Born: 5 November 1924 Reykjavík, Iceland
- Died: 28 November 2003 (aged 79) Hafnarfjörður, Iceland

Sport
- Sport: Athletics
- Event: Javelin throw

Jóel Sigurðsson (5 November 1924 – 28 November 2003) was an Icelandic athlete. He competed in the men's javelin throw at the 1948 Summer Olympics.
