= Lee Bartlett =

American javelin thrower (1907–1972)

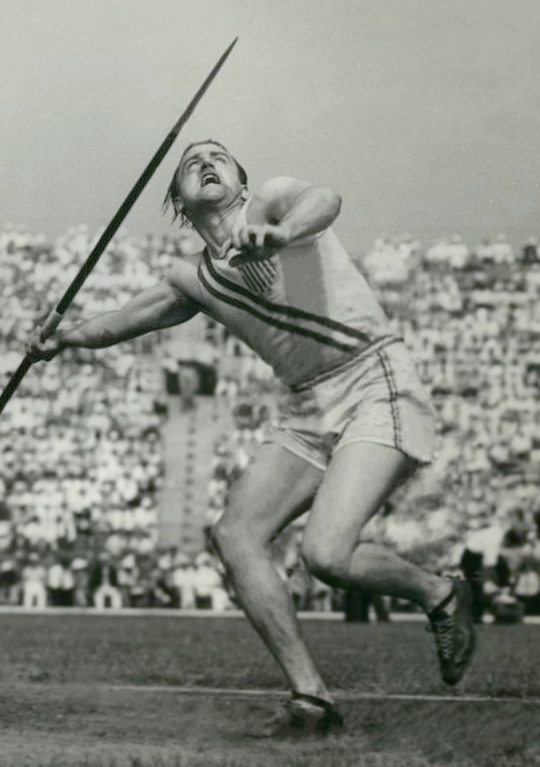
- Bartlett in 1936

Personal information
- Born: March 30, 1907 Hillsdale, Michigan, U.S.
- Died: October 31, 1972 (aged 65) Dearborn Heights, Michigan, U.S.
- Height: 183 cm (6 ft 0 in)
- Weight: 75 kg (165 lb)

Sport
- Sport: Athletics
- Event: Javelin throw
- Club: Albion College

Achievements and titles
- Personal best: 68.15 m (1936)

Lee Marion Bartlett (March 30, 1907 – October 31, 1972) was an American javelin thrower. He competed at the 1928, 1932 and 1936 Olympics and placed 16th, 5th and 12th, respectively.

== Albion College ==
Bartlett attended high school in Union City, Michigan; he did not take up the javelin until joining the track team at Albion College in 1926. Bartlett was twice Albion's team captain and four times the Michigan Intercollegiate Athletic Association javelin champion; his 1928 MIAA Field Day record was not bettered until 1969. During his junior year – in addition to competing in the Olympic Games – Bartlett won the 1928 NCAA Track and Field Championships, establishing a new NCAA and American Open record in the process. The following year, Bartlett was runner-up at the United States Open (AAU) Championships.

== Post-collegiate years ==
In 1930 and 1932, Bartlett was once again the National AAU runner-up; he also placed fifth at the 1932 Olympic Games in Los Angeles. In 1933, Lee Bartlett won his first and only AAU title in the javelin throw. Three years later, Bartlett took first place at the United States Olympic Trials, qualifying him for a berth to the 1936 Olympic Games. Bartlett remained an active competitor in the javelin through the early 1940s; he very nearly became the first American to throw 240-feet (73.15 meters) at a 1940 exhibition in Grand Rapids, Michigan.

After hanging up his javelin boots in 1942, Bartlett embarked upon a rewarding 30-year career as a teacher and athletic coach in Dearborn, Michigan. He died on October 31, 1972, aged 65. To this day, Lee Bartlett remains the only Albion College and MIAA athlete to compete in the Olympic Games; he was honored posthumously in 1989 with induction to the Albion College Athletic Hall of Fame.

== See also ==
- Track and Field Competitors at the 1928 Olympics
