= Night of Speed =

Rare incident when three men set the world record in the 100 metres in the same track meet

The Night of Speed was the rare occurrence when three men set the world record in the 100 metres in the same track meet. On Thursday, June 20, 1968, two semi-final races were held as part of the AAU National Championships at Hughes Stadium in Sacramento, California.

== History ==
At the time, the world record for the 100 metres was 10.0 seconds, hand timed, set, and equaled over the years by Armin Hary (Germany) and Harry Jerome (Canada) in 1960, Horacio Esteves (Venezuela) and Bob Hayes (United States) in 1964, Jim Hines (U.S.) and Enrique Figuerola (Cuba) in 1967, and by Paul Nash (South Africa) and Oliver Ford (U.S.) earlier in 1968.

== Sacramento ==
Earlier in the day, with the maximum allowable wind of 2.0 metres per second (7.2 km/h; 4.5 mph), Roger Bambuck (France) and Charles Greene (U.S.) had again tied the world record (10.0).

With an aiding wind of 0.8 m/s (2.9 km/h; 1.8 mph), Hines won the first semi-final, timed in 9.9 seconds, to set the new world record, but in second place Ronnie Ray Smith was also credited with the same time, equalling the world record. Minutes later in the second semi-final, with a 0.9 m/s (3.2 km/h; 2.0 mph) aiding wind Greene was also given the same time. As this was before the acceptance of fully automatic timing, the hand times were official, each recorded by three separate hand timed stopwatches. An experimental Accutrack automatic timing device was being used for this meet: the times recorded by it showed Hines ran 10.03, Smith 10.14, and Greene 10.10, information held for the interest of future track statisticians.

Later that evening, Greene went on to win the national championship, posting a wind-aided 10.0 seconds in the final, the same time as the next five finishers (Hines, Lennox Miller, Bambruck, Smith, and Mel Pender).

== Afterward ==
Less than four months later, with the assistance of the altitude of Mexico City at the 1968 Olympics, Hines improved the record to 9.95 while winning the gold medal on October 14, which became the first accepted fully automatic timed world record accepted when the IAAF adopted such times in 1977. At those same Olympics, Greene took the bronze medal and all three teamed with Mel Pender to win the gold medal in the 4x100 m relay in world record time. Over the next eight seasons, before the IAAF changed their record criteria, six more individuals tied the 9.9 hand timed world record. The automatic 9.95 was not surpassed until 1983, when Calvin Smith ran 9.93, again at altitude exceeding 7,000 feet (2,130 m), at the U.S. Air Force Academy near Colorado Springs, Colorado.

It is worth noting that Bob Hayes was timed at 9.9 seconds four years earlier in the final of the 100 metres at the 1964 Olympics in Tokyo. The official time was given as 10.0 seconds because of an idiosyncratic method of measuring the 'hand' times, which were only used at that Olympics.

== See also ==
- Men's 100 metres world record progression
