= 1968 USA Outdoor Track and Field Championships =

- Dates: June 19–21, August 14–18
- Host city: Sacramento, California; Aurora, Colorado; United States
- Venue: Hughes Stadium, Sacramento City College; Aurora Public School Stadium

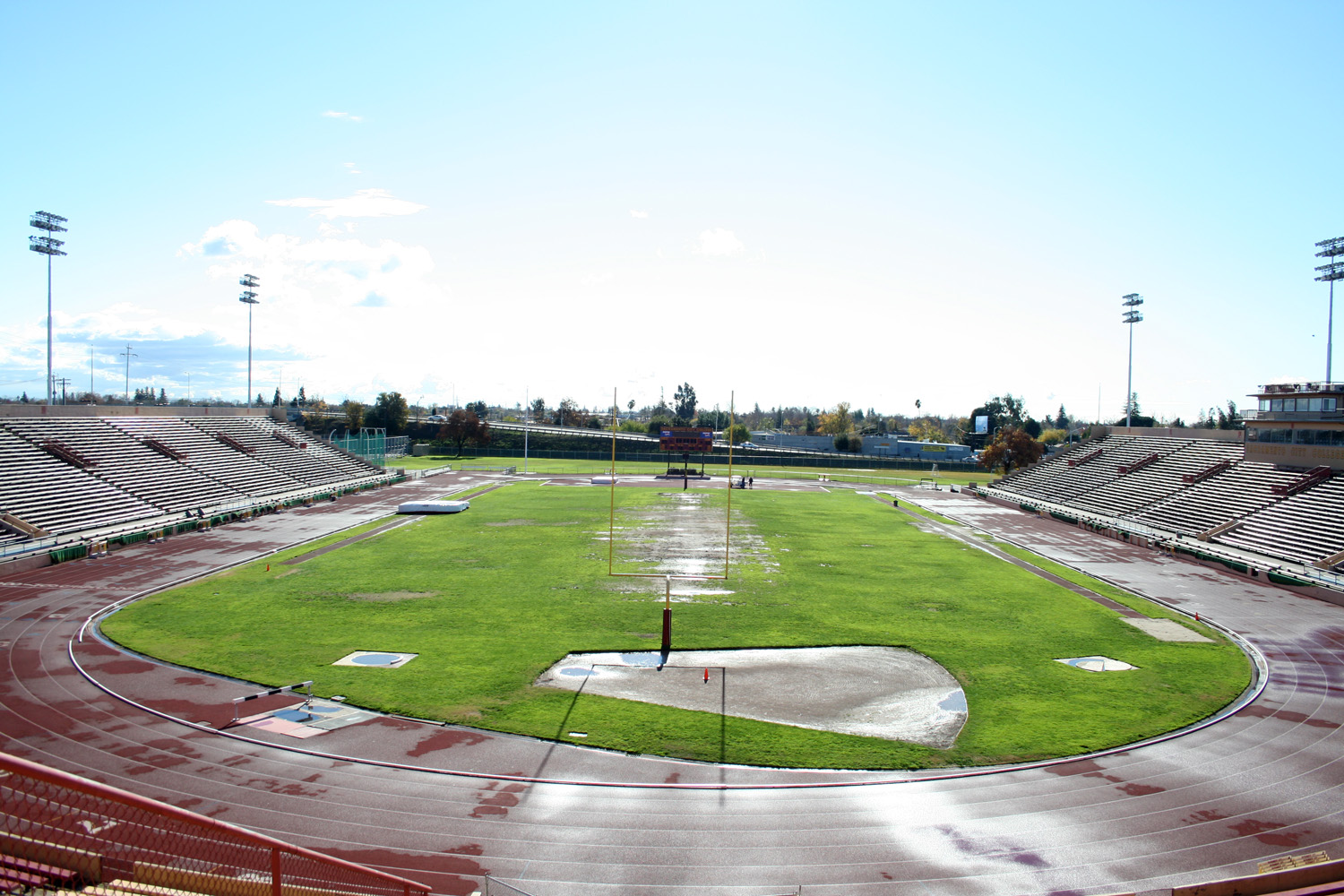
Hughes Stadium

The 1968 USA Outdoor Track and Field Championships men's competition took place between June 19–21 at Hughes Stadium on the campus of Sacramento City College in Sacramento, California. The women's division held their championships separately almost two months later, combined with the Girls Track and Field Championships at Aurora Public School Stadium in Aurora, Colorado. The 20K race walk took place in Long Beach, California on June 29.

The anticipation of the 1968 Summer Olympics affected the choice of Aurora due to the high altitude. The late August date because the entire track and field calendar shifted later due to the late October dates for the Olympics. Being an Olympic year, all races were run in meters.

It was at this meet, on the evening of June 20, 1968, when three men, Jim Hines, Ronnie Ray Smith and Charlie Greene, bettered the (hand timed) world record in the 100 metres (and several others were very close), is famous amongst track and field historians as the "Night of Speed." Hand timing was the official timing system for track and field worldwide for another 9 years. During that time, the record was equalled a further 11 times by six additional individuals but was never beaten.

== Results ==
=== Men track events ===
Event	Gold		Silver		Bronze	
100 meters	Charles Greene	10.0w	Jim Hines	10.0w	Lennox Miller; Jamaica; Roger Bambuck; France; Ronnie Ray Smith	10.1w
200 meters	Tommie Smith	20.3 CR	John Carlos	20.4	Ronnie Ray Smith	20.6
400 meters	Lee Evans	45.0 CR	Vince Matthews	45.0 CR	Wayne Collett	45.4
800 meters	Wade Bell	1:45.5 CR	Mark Winzenried	1:46.5	Byron Dyce Jamaica; John Perry	1:46.5; 1:46.6
1500 meters	John Mason	3:43.1	Roscoe Divine	3:43.4	Brian Kivlan	3:44.0
5000 meters	Bob Day	13:50.4 CR	Bob Finlay Canada; Larry Wieczorek	13:53.4; 13:56.0	Van Nelson	13:56.8
10,000 meters	Tracy Smith	28:47.0 CR	Bill Clark	28:56.6	Van Nelson	28:57.6
110 meters hurdles	Earl McCullouch	13.64	Tommy Lee White	13.68	Mike Butler	13.80
400 meters hurdles	Ron Whitney	49.6 CR	Gary Knoke Australia; Russ Rogers	49.8; 50.3	Andy Bell	50.3
3000 meters steeplechase	George Young	8:30.6 NR	Bob Price	8:35.4	Conrad Nightingale	8:38.4
3000 m racewalk	Don DeNoon	12:37.9	Ron Laird	12:40.6	Larry Young	12:49.4
20 kilometres race walk	Ron Laird	1:33:00.0	Larry Young	1:33:05.2	Don DeNoon	1:33:24.4

=== Men field events ===
Event	Gold		Silver		Bronze	
High jump	Ed Hanks	2.11 m (6 ft 11 in)	Otis Burrell	2.11 m (6 ft 11 in)	Lew Hoyt	2.11 m (6 ft 11 in)
Pole vault	Dick Railsback	5.19 m (17 ft 1/4 in)	Jonathan Vaughn	5.08 m (16 ft 8 in)	Casey Carrigan	5.08 m (16 ft 8 in)
Long jump	Bob Beamon	8.33 m (27 ft 3 3/4 in) CR	Ralph Boston	8.12 m (26 ft 7 1/2 in)	Charles Mays	7.91 m (25 ft 11 1/4 in)
Triple jump	Art Walker	16.39 m (53 ft 9 1/4 in) CR	Dave Smith	16.24 m (53 ft 3 1/4 in)	Charles Craig	16.19 m (53 ft 1 1/4 in)
Shot put	Randy Matson	20.55 m (67 ft 5 in) CR	Dave Maggard	19.92 m (65 ft 4 1/4 in)	George Woods	19.56 m (64 ft 2 in)
Discus throw	Jay Silvester	62.10 m (203 ft 8 in)	Al Oerter	59.28 m (194 ft 5 in)	Tim Vollmer	56.89 m (186 ft 7 in)
Hammer throw	Ed Burke	66.14 m (216 ft 11 in)	George Frenn	65.50 m (214 ft 10 in)	Hal Connolly	65.25 m (214 ft 0 in)
Javelin throw	Frank Covelli	82.14 m (269 ft 5 in)	Gary Stenlund	79.93 m (262 ft 2 in)	Mark Murro	77.49 m (254 ft 2 in)
Pentathlon	Joe Hilbe	3456 pts				
All-around decathlon	Bill Walsh	7609 pts				
Decathlon	Bill Toomey	8037	John Warkentin	7370	Dick Emberger	7263

=== Women track events ===
Event	Gold		Silver		Bronze	
100 meters	Margaret Bailes	11.1	Wyomia Tyus	11.3	Chi Cheng; Taiwan; Mildrette Netter	11.3 11.4
200 meters	Wyomia Tyus	23.5	Margaret Bailes	23.7	Mildrette Netter	24.1
400 meters	Jarvis Scott	52.9	Louise Drinkwater	54.6	Gail Fitzgerald	54.6
800 meters	Doris Brown	2:05.1	Madeline Manning	2:07.6	Francie Kraker	2:07.8
1500 meters	Jane Hill	4:46.5	Maureen Dickson	4:47.3	Judy Oliver	4:49.3
80 meters hurdles	Mamie Rallins	10.6	Chi Cheng; Taiwan; Patty Van Wolvelaere	10.7 11.0	Judy Dyer	11.2

=== Women field events ===
Event	Gold		Silver		Bronze	
High jump	Theresa Thresher	1.67 m (5 ft 5 1/2 in)	Eleanor Montgomery	1.67 m (5 ft 5 1/2 in)	Sharon Callahan	1.67 m (5 ft 5 1/2 in)
Long jump	Willye White	6.38 m (20 ft 11 in)	Martha Watson	6.25 m (20 ft 6 in)	Chi Cheng; Taiwan; Barbara Brown	6.08 m (19 ft 11 1/4 in) 5.90 m (19 ft 4 1/4 in)
Shot put	Maren Seidler	15.33 m (50 ft 3 1/2 in)	Lynn Graham	14.32 m (46 ft 11 3/4 in)	Carmelita Capilla	14.06 m (46 ft 1 1/2 in)
Discus throw	Olga Connolly	52.07 m (170 ft 10 in)	Carol Moseke	49.02 m (160 ft 9 in)	Nancy Norberg	48.39 m (158 ft 9 in)
Javelin throw	Barbara Friedrich	54.51 m (178 ft 10 in)	RaNae Bair	50.65 m (166 ft 2 in)	Louise Gerrish	49.27 m (161 ft 7 in)
Pentathlon	Chi Cheng; Taiwan; Patricia Daniels-Winslow	4823 4481	Barbara Emerson	4327	Jan Glotzer	4319

=== Men's 100 m results ===
==== Semi-finals ====
Semi-final 1 (Wind +0.8 mps)

Rank	Name	Nationality	Time	Notes
1	Jim Hines	United States	9.9 (10.03)	WR
2	Ronnie Ray Smith	United States	9.9 (10.14)	WR
3	Mel Pender	United States	10.0	=existing WR
4	Larry Questad	United States	10.0	=existing WR
6	Kirk Clayton	United States	10.0	=existing WR
6	Ernie Provost	United States	10.0	=existing WR

Semi-final 2 (Wind +0.9 mps)

Rank	Name	Nationality	Time	Notes
1	Charlie Greene	United States	9.9 (10.10)	WR
2	Lennox Miller	Jamaica	10.0	=existing WR
3	Roger Bambuck	France	10.0	=existing WR

==== Heats ====
Heat 1 (Wind +2.8 mps)

Rank	Name	Nationality	Time	Notes
1	Jim Hines	United States	9.8w	
2	Ronnie Ray Smith	United States	10.0w	

Heat 2 (Wind +2.8 mps)

Rank	Name	Nationality	Time	Notes
1	Mel Pender	United States	10.0w	

Heat 3 (Wind +2.7 mps)

Rank	Name	Nationality	Time	Notes
1	Lennox Miller	Jamaica	10.0w	
2	Bill Gaines	United States	10.0w	

Heat 4 (Wind +2.0 mps)

Rank	Name	Nationality	Time	Notes
1	Charlie Greene	United States	10.0	=WR
2	Roger Bambuck	France	10.0	=WR

== See also ==
- United States Olympic Trials (track and field)
