= 1968 in the sport of athletics =

1968 in athletics
- Major world events: Olympic Games

While the most notable story coming out of 1968 was socio-political, politics involved with the Olympics was not something unique to this year. However, the year marked the beginning of several emerging elements of contemporary track and field.

== Automatic timing ==
While timing to the 100th of a second had been experimented with for many years, the 1968 Summer Olympics were the first to use Fully Automatic Timing, in not only athletics, but in canoeing, rowing, cycling, equestrian and swimming competitions. Subsequently, systems to record such times became more common and thus the accuracy of Fully Automatic Timing became mandated for World Record acceptance. While this rule was officially put into place in 1977, many 1968 records still stood as the first Automatically timed record.

== All weather tracks ==
This technology too had been developing, but Tartan tracks were used as the competition surface for the first time at an Olympics. Since then an all-weather running track was required for all top-level competition. Subsequently, the inconsistency of the running surface became a significantly smaller factor in athletic performance.

== Altitude ==
With the Olympics happening in Mexico City, at high altitude, the effect of the thin air on athletic performance became a factor on world records. This was already a known phenomenon, and the American team was selected by holding the Olympic Trials at high altitude at Echo Summit, California. In 1955, Lou Jones set the world record in the 400 meters at altitude in Mexico City. Following the 1968 Summer Olympics the:

- Men's 100 meters record, set by Jim Hines United States lasted almost 15 years, to be replaced by another mark set by Calvin Smith at altitude in Colorado Springs that lasted another four years.
- Men's 200 meters record, set by Tommie Smith United States lasted almost 11 years, to be replaced by another mark also set on the same track that lasted almost 17 more years. At the high altitude United States Olympic Trials at Echo Summit, California that year, John Carlos United States had posted a prior world record that was never ratified due to the spike formation of his shoes.
- Men's 400 meters record, set by Lee Evans United States lasted almost 20 years. At the high altitude United States Olympic Trials at Echo Summit, California that year, Evans had posted a prior world record that was also never ratified due to his shoes. Larry James United States in second place, also beat the previous world record and was awarded the record.
- Men's 800 meters Ralph Doubell equalled Peter Snell's 1962 world record. The record was again equalled by Dave Wottle at the 1972 U.S. Olympic Trials a month before he won the gold medal in Munich. The record lasted until 1973 when it was finally broken by Marcello Fiasconaro.
- Men's 400 meter hurdles record that was set by Geoff Vanderstock United States at the high altitude United States Olympic Trials that year, was improved upon at the Olympics by David Hemery United Kingdom and lasted four years.
- Men's Long Jump record had been set a year earlier in a Mexico City preparation meet, but was improved upon by Bob Beamon United States an incredible 22 inches or 55 cm. That record lasted almost 23 years and still has only been beaten once. The feat was so outstanding it spawned a new adjective "beamonesque".
- Men's Triple Jump record was set and improved five times at Mexico City including on the last jump in the competition by Viktor Saneyev Soviet Union, three years later it was improved upon again, by Pedro Pérez Cuba at altitude in Cali, Colombia. A year later that was improved upon at sea level by Saneyev, but three years later the record was again set at Mexico City by João Carlos de Oliveira Brazil, which lasted ten more years.
- Men's Pole Vault was set at the high altitude United States Olympic Trials by Bob Seagren United States, the eventual gold medalist. The record lasted until the next summer. The current outdoor World Record in the Pole Vault, was set in 2023 at normal altitude by Armand Duplantis from Sweden.
- Decathlon Bill Toomey's World Decathlon best in the 400 metres, 45.6 (45.68 FAT) lasted almost 47 years until it was beaten by Ashton Eaton while setting the world record in 2015.
- Men's 4 × 100 Relay record was set three times in Mexico City, including both semi-finals and the final by the United States which lasted until the next Olympics
- Men's 4 × 400 Relay record by the United States lasted almost 24 years (although it was equalled after 20 years).
- Women's 100 meter record, set by Wyomia Tyus United States lasted almost 4 years.
- Women's 200 metres record, set by Irena Szewińska Poland lasted almost 2 years.
- Women's Long Jump record, set by Viorica Viscopoleanu Romania lasted almost 2 years.
- Women's 4 × 100 Relay record, set by the United States lasted until the next Olympics

== East Africa ==
1968 marked the emergence of high altitude trained long-distance runners from Kenya. While Abebe Bikila's Ethiopia victories in the two previous Olympic Marathons had announced to the world the potential of East African athletes, Kenya won its first gold medals in Mexico City, and it won three of them, including the Steeplechase which it would subsequently claim ownership of. Kenya has won the men's steeplechase in every Olympics they have participated in from 1968 to 2016. Ethiopia won its third straight marathon. There has been a fierce athletic rivalry between Kenya and Ethiopia ever since, while both countries and their neighbors have dominated long-distance running both on the track and on the roads.

== Fosbury flop ==
Video on YouTube showing Fosbury's flop

Dick Fosbury was the first to do what is now called the Fosbury flop to the high jump. He learned to take advantage of the new foam landing pads (another technical innovation introduced in this era) by jumping over the bar backwards. Canadian Debbie Brill started doing the "Brill bend" about the same time, but Fosbury got the most exposure, winning the Olympics. The prevailing methods involved jumping forwards or sideways, styles called the roll or Western roll and previous to that, the "scissors" style. After Fosbury's victory, the flop became almost the only style used by elite competitors.

== Performance enhancing drugs ==
This was the first Olympics to do drug testing, though primarily these initial searches were for narcotics and stimulants.
