= Men's 100 metres world record progression =

List of world records for men's 100m sprint

IAAF-ratified world record progression for the men's 100 m. In 1977 the IAAF began requiring fully automatic timing, accounting for both the increase in measured times and the decrease in measurement uncertainty.

The first world record in the 100 metres for men (athletics) was recognised by the International Amateur Athletics Federation, now known as World Athletics, in 1912.

As of 21 June 2011, the IAAF has ratified 67 records in the event, not including rescinded records.

== Unofficial progression before the IAAF ==
Unofficial world records and best known times up to 1912
| Time | Athlete | Nationality | Location of races | Date |
|---|---|---|---|---|
| 10.8 | Luther Cary | United States | Paris, France | 4 July 1891 |
| 10.8 | Cecil Lee | United Kingdom | Brussels, Belgium | 25 September 1892 |
| 10.8 | Étienne De Ré | Belgium | Brussels, Belgium | 4 August 1893 |
| 10.8 | L. Atcherley | United Kingdom | Frankfurt/Main, Germany | 13 April 1895 |
| 10.8 | Harry Beaton | United Kingdom | Rotterdam, Netherlands | 28 August 1895 |
| 10.8 | Harald Anderson-Arbin | Sweden | Helsingborg, Sweden | 9 August 1896 |
| 10.8 | Isaac Westergren | Sweden | Gävle, Sweden | 11 September 1898 |
| 10.8 | Isaac Westergren | Sweden | Gävle, Sweden | 10 September 1899 |
| 10.8 | Frank Jarvis | United States | Paris, France | 14 July 1900 |
| 10.8 | Walter Tewksbury | United States | Paris, France | 14 July 1900 |
| 10.8 | Carl Ljung | Sweden | Stockholm, Sweden | 23 September 1900 |
| 10.8 | Walter Tewksbury | United States | Philadelphia, United States | 6 October 1900 |
| 10.8 | André Passat | France | Bordeaux, France | 14 June 1903 |
| 10.8 | Louis Kuhn | Switzerland | Bordeaux, France | 14 June 1903 |
| 10.8 | Harald Grønfeldt | Denmark | Aarhus, Denmark | 5 July 1903 |
| 10.8 | Eric Frick | Sweden | Jönköping, Sweden | 9 August 1903 |
| 10.6 | Knut Lindberg | Sweden | Gothenburg, Sweden | 26 August 1906 |
| 10.5 | Emil Ketterer | Germany | Karlsruhe, Germany | 9 July 1911 |
| 10.5 | Richard Rau | Germany | Braunschweig, Germany | 13 August 1911 |
| 10.5 | Richard Rau | Germany | Munich, Germany | 12 May 1912 |
| 10.5 | Erwin Kern | Germany | Munich, Germany | 26 May 1912 |

== IAAF record progression ==
| Ratified |
| Not ratified |
| Ratified but later rescinded |

"Wind" in these tables refers to wind assistance, the velocity of the wind parallel to the runner - positive values are from the starting line towards the finish line, negative are from the finish line towards the starting line, 0 is no wind in either direction, and all values are measured in metres per second. Any wind perpendicular to the runners (from left to right, right to left, or up to down or down to up, although the conditions of the track generally preclude those wind directions) is ignored and not listed.

"Auto" refers to automatic timing, and for the purposes of these lists, indicates auto times which were either also taken for hand-timed records, or were rounded to the tenth or hundredth of a second (depending on the rounding rules then in effect) for the official record time.

=== Records 1912–1976 ===
| Time | Wind | Auto | Athlete | Nationality | Location of race | Date | Ref. |
|---|---|---|---|---|---|---|---|
| 10.6 | | | Donald Lippincott | United States | Stockholm, Sweden | 6 July 1912 | |
| 10.6 | | | Jackson Scholz | United States | Stockholm, Sweden | 16 September 1920 | |
| 10.4 | | | Charley Paddock | United States | Redlands, USA | 23 April 1921 | |
| 10.4 | ±0.0 | | Eddie Tolan | United States | Stockholm, Sweden | 8 August 1929 | |
| 10.4 | | | Eddie Tolan | United States | Copenhagen, Denmark | 25 August 1929 | |
| 10.3 | | | Percy Williams | Canada | Toronto, Canada | 9 August 1930 | |
| 10.3 | +0.4 | 10.38 | Eddie Tolan | United States | Los Angeles, USA | 1 August 1932 | |
| 10.3 | | | Ralph Metcalfe | United States | Budapest, Hungary | 12 August 1933 | |
| 10.3 | | | Eulace Peacock | United States | Oslo, Norway | 6 August 1934 | |
| 10.3 | | | Chris Berger | Netherlands | Amsterdam, Netherlands | 26 August 1934 | |
| 10.3 | | | Ralph Metcalfe | United States | Osaka, Japan | 15 September 1934 | |
| 10.3 | +2.0 | | Ralph Metcalfe | United States | Dairen, Japan | 23 September 1934 | |
| 10.3 | +2.5 | | Takayoshi Yoshioka | Japan | Tokyo, Japan | 15 June 1935 | |
| 10.2 | +1.2 | | Jesse Owens | United States | Chicago, USA | 20 June 1936 | |
| 10.3 | +0.5 | | Lennart Strandberg | Sweden | Malmö, Sweden | 26 September 1936 | (Note: Lennart Strandberg ran 10.3 to tie the then-extant world record on September 26, 1936, and this was ratified as a world record. On February 28, 1938, the IAAF ratified Jesse Owens' 10.2 from June 20, 1936, meaning Strandberg's mark, achieved after Owens', was rescinded as a record.) |
| 10.2 | −0.9 | | Harold Davis | United States | Compton, USA | 6 June 1941 | |
| 10.2 | +0.7 | | Lloyd LaBeach | Panama | Fresno, USA | 15 May 1948 | |
| 10.2 | | 10.35 | Barney Ewell | United States | Evanston, United States | 9 July 1948 | |
| 10.2 | ±0.0 | | McDonald Bailey | Great Britain | Belgrade, Yugoslavia | 25 August 1951 | |
| 10.2 | +1.1 | | Heinz Fütterer | West Germany | Yokohama, Japan | 31 October 1954 | |
| 10.2 | +0.9 | | Bobby Morrow | United States | Houston, USA | 19 May 1956 | |
| 10.2 | −1.0 | | Ira Murchison | United States | Compton, USA | 1 June 1956 | |
| 10.2 | ±0.0 | | Bobby Morrow | United States | Bakersfield, USA | 22 June 1956 | |
| 10.2 | −1.3 | | Ira Murchison | United States | Los Angeles, USA | 29 June 1956 | |
| 10.2 | −0.4 | | Bobby Morrow | United States | Los Angeles, USA | 29 June 1956 | |
| 10.1 | +0.7 | | Willie Williams | United States | Berlin, Germany | 3 August 1956 | |
| 10.1 | +1.0 | | Ira Murchison | United States | Berlin, Germany | 4 August 1956 | |
| 10.1 | +1.5 | | Leamon King | United States | Ontario, USA | 20 October 1956 | |
| 10.1 | +0.9 | | Leamon King | United States | Santa Ana, USA | 27 October 1956 | |
| 10.1 | +1.3 | | Ray Norton | United States | San Jose, USA | 18 April 1959 | |
| 10.0 | +0.9 | 10.25 | Armin Hary | West Germany | Zürich, Switzerland | 21 June 1960 | |
| 10.0 | +1.8 | | Harry Jerome | Canada | Saskatoon, Canada | 15 July 1960 | |
| 10.0 | ±0.0 | | Horacio Esteves | Venezuela | Caracas, Venezuela | 15 August 1964 | |
| 10.0 | +1.3 | 10.06 | Bob Hayes | United States | Tokyo, Japan | 15 October 1964 | |
| 10.0 | +2.0 | 10.17 | Jim Hines | United States | Modesto, USA | 27 May 1967 | |
| 10.0 | +1.8 | | Enrique Figuerola | Cuba | Budapest, Hungary | 17 June 1967 | |
| 10.0 | ±0.0 | | Paul Nash | South Africa | Krugersdorp, South Africa | 2 April 1968 | |
| 10.0 | +1.1 | | Oliver Ford | United States | Albuquerque, USA | 31 May 1968 | |
| 10.0 | +2.0 | 10.20 | Charles Greene | United States | Sacramento, USA | 20 June 1968 | |
| 10.0 | +2.0 | 10.28 | Roger Bambuck | France | Sacramento, USA | 20 June 1968 | |
| 9.9 | +0.8 | 10.03 | Jim Hines | United States | Sacramento, USA | 20 June 1968 | |
| 9.9 | +0.8 | 10.14 | Ronnie Ray Smith | United States | Sacramento, USA | 20 June 1968 | |
| 9.9 | +0.9 | 10.10 | Charles Greene | United States | Sacramento, USA | 20 June 1968 | |
| 9.9 | +0.3 | 9.95 | Jim Hines | United States | Mexico City, Mexico | 14 October 1968 | |
| 9.9 | ±0.0 | | Eddie Hart | United States | Eugene, USA | 1 July 1972 | |
| 9.9 | ±0.0 | | Rey Robinson | United States | Eugene, USA | 1 July 1972 | |
| 9.9 | +1.3 | | Steve Williams | United States | Los Angeles, USA | 21 June 1974 | |
| 9.9 | +1.7 | | Silvio Leonard | Cuba | Ostrava, Czechoslovakia | 5 June 1975 | |
| 9.9 | ±0.0 | | Steve Williams | United States | Siena, Italy | 16 July 1975 | |
| 9.9 | −0.2 | | Steve Williams | United States | Berlin, Germany | 22 August 1975 | |
| 9.9 | +0.7 | | Steve Williams | United States | Gainesville, USA | 27 March 1976 | |
| 9.9 | +0.7 | | Harvey Glance | United States | Columbia, USA | 3 April 1976 | |
| 9.9 | | | Harvey Glance | United States | Baton Rouge, USA | 1 May 1976 | |
| 9.9 | +1.7 | | Don Quarrie | Jamaica | Modesto, USA | 22 May 1976 | |

The first manual time of 9.9 seconds was recorded for Bob Hayes in the final of the 100 metres at the 1964 Olympics. Hayes' official time of 10.0 seconds was determined by rounding down the electronic time of 10.06 to the nearest tenth of a second, giving the appearance of a manual time. This method was unique to the Olympics of 1964 and 1968, and the officials at the track recorded Hayes' time as 9.9 seconds. Similarly, the Amateur Athletic Union's introduction of FAT at its 1975 championships meant that Steve Williams' manual 9.8 seconds in the 100 metres semifinal was discounted in favour of the FAT of 10.19 seconds.

=== Records since 1977 ===
Since 1975, the IAAF has accepted separate automatically electronically timed records for events up to 400 metres. Starting on January 1, 1977, the IAAF has required fully automatic timing to the hundredth of a second for these events.

Jim Hines' October 1968 Olympic gold medal run was the fastest recorded fully electronic 100 metre race up to that date, at 9.95 seconds. Track and Field News has compiled an unofficial list of automatically timed records starting with the 1964 Olympics and Bob Hayes' gold medal performance there. Those marks are included in the progression.

The event is linked on some of the dates.

| Time | Wind | Auto | Athlete | Nationality | Location of race | Date | Notes (Note: "A" stands for records set more than 1,000 metres above sea level, "OR" stands for Olympic record, "CR" stands for World Championships record) | Duration of record |
|---|---|---|---|---|---|---|---|---|
| 10.06 | +1.3 | | Bob Hayes | United States | Tokyo, Japan | 15 October 1964 | | 3 years, 8 months and 5 days |
| 10.03 | +0.8 | | Jim Hines | United States | Sacramento, USA | 20 June 1968 | | 3 months and 23 days |
| 10.02 | +2.0 | | Charles Greene | United States | Mexico City, Mexico | 13 October 1968 | A | 1 day |
| 9.95 | +0.3 | | Jim Hines | United States | Mexico City, Mexico | 14 October 1968 | OR, A | 14 years, 8 months and 19 days |
| 9.93 | +1.4 | | Calvin Smith | United States | Colorado Springs, USA | 3 July 1983 | A | 4 years, 1 month and 27 days |
| 9.83 | +1.0 | | Ben Johnson | Canada | Rome, Italy | 30 August 1987 | (Note: Ben Johnson's time of 9.79 on September 24, 1988 was disallowed and never ratified as a record as he tested positive for stanozolol after the race. Johnson subsequently admitted to steroid use between 1981 and 1988, and his world record of 9.83 set on August 30, 1987 was rescinded by the IAAF Council in September 1989.(Track and Field News, November 1989, vol. 42, #11, p. 37)) | 0 days |
| 9.93 | +1.0 | | Carl Lewis | United States | Rome, Italy | 30 August 1987 | (Note: Carl Lewis's times of 9.93 were deemed by the IAAF to have equalled the world record after Ben Johnson's 9.83 time was rescinded, but were never ratified as world records, and his time of 9.92 to win the gold medal at the Seoul Olympics after Johnson was disqualified was recognized as the world record from January 1, 1990.) | 11 months and 18 days |
| 9.93 | +1.1 | | Carl Lewis | United States | Zürich, Switzerland | 17 August 1988 | | 1 month and 7 days |
| 9.79 | +1.1 | | Ben Johnson | Canada | Seoul, South Korea | 24 September 1988 | | 0 days |
| 9.92 | +1.1 | | Carl Lewis | United States | Seoul, South Korea | 24 September 1988 | OR | 2 years, 8 months and 21 days |
| 9.90 | +1.9 | | Leroy Burrell | United States | New York, USA | 14 June 1991 | | 2 months and 11 days |
| 9.86 | +1.2 (Note: per IAAF profile; +1.0 m/s per IAAF statistic handbook) | | Carl Lewis | United States | Tokyo, Japan | 25 August 1991 | | 2 years, 10 months and 11 days |
| 9.85 | +1.2 | 9.848 | Leroy Burrell | United States | Lausanne, Switzerland | 6 July 1994 | | 2 years and 21 days |
| 9.84 | +0.7 | 9.835 | Donovan Bailey | Canada | Atlanta, USA | 27 July 1996 | OR | 2 years, 10 months and 20 days |
| 9.79 | +0.1 | | Maurice Greene | United States | Athens, Greece | 16 June 1999 | | 3 years, 2 months and 29 days |
| 9.78 | +2.0 | | Tim Montgomery | United States | Paris, France | 14 September 2002 | (Note: Tim Montgomery's time of 9.78 on September 14, 2002 was rescinded after a 2005 ruling on his involvement with BALCO scandal ordered his results from 2001-2005 struck from the records and ordered him to forfeit medals and prizes from that time. By that time, however, it had been surpassed by Asafa Powell.) | 2 years and 9 months |
| 9.77 | +1.6 | 9.768 | Asafa Powell | Jamaica | Athens, Greece | 14 June 2005 | | 10 months and 28 days |
| 9.77 | +1.7 | 9.766 | Justin Gatlin | United States | Doha, Qatar | 12 May 2006 | (Note: Justin Gatlin was briefly credited with a new world record time of 9.76, but five days later the IAAF announced that the official timers, Tissot Timing, had discovered Gatlin's time of 9.766 had erroneously been rounded down to the nearest hundredth instead of rounded up. This time instead made Gatlin co-world record holder with Asafa Powell, but this was rescinded in 2007 after Gatlin failed a doping test.) | 30 days |
| 9.77 | +1.5 | 9.763 | Asafa Powell | Jamaica | Gateshead, United Kingdom | 11 June 2006 | | 2 months and 7 days |
| 9.77 | +1.0 | 9.762 | Asafa Powell | Jamaica | Zürich, Switzerland | 18 August 2006 | | 1 year and 22 days |
| 9.74 | +1.7 | 9.735 | Asafa Powell | Jamaica | Rieti, Italy | 9 September 2007 | | 8 months and 22 days |
| 9.72 | +1.7 | 9.715 | Usain Bolt | Jamaica | New York, USA | 31 May 2008 | | 2 months and 16 days |
| 9.69 | ±0.0 | 9.683 | Usain Bolt | Jamaica | Beijing, China | 16 August 2008 | OR | 1 year |
| 9.58 | +0.9 | 9.572 | Usain Bolt | Jamaica | Berlin, Germany | 16 August 2009 | CR | 17 years and 28 days |

=== Low-altitude record progression 1968–1987 ===
The IAAF considers marks set at high altitude as acceptable for record consideration. However, high altitude can significantly assist sprint performances. One estimate suggests times in the 200 m sprint can be assisted by between 0.09s and 0.14s with the maximum allowable tailing wind of 2.0 m/s, and gain 0.3s at altitudes over 2000m. For this reason, unofficial low-altitude record lists have been compiled.

After the IAAF started to recognise only electronic times in 1977, the then-current record and subsequent record were both set at altitude. It was not until 1987 that the world record was equalled or surpassed by a low-altitude performance. The following progression of low-altitude records therefore starts with Hines's low-altitude "record" when the IAAF started to recognise only electronic timing in 1977, and continues to Lewis's low-altitude performance that equalled the high-altitude world record in 1987. (Ben Johnson's 9.95 run in 1986 and 9.83 run in 1987 are omitted.)

| Time | Athlete | Nationality | Location of race | Date |
|---|---|---|---|---|
| 10.03 | Jim Hines | United States | Sacramento, USA | 20 June 1968 |
| 10.03 | Silvio Leonard | Cuba | Havana, Cuba | 13 September 1977 |
| 10.02 | James Sanford | United States | Westwood, USA | 11 May 1980 |
| 10.00 | Carl Lewis | United States | Dallas, USA | 16 May 1981 |
| 10.00 | Carl Lewis | United States | Modesto, USA | 15 May 1982 |
| 9.97 | Carl Lewis | United States | Modesto, USA | 14 May 1983 |
| 9.97 | Calvin Smith | United States | Zürich, Switzerland | 24 August 1983 |
| 9.96 | Mel Lattany | United States | Athens, USA | 5 May 1984 |
| 9.93 | Carl Lewis | United States | Rome, Italy | 30 August 1987 |

== See also ==
- Women's 100 metres world record progression
- Men's 200 metres world record progression
- 100-yard dash
