= Oliver Ford =

Oliver Ford may refer to:

- Oliver Ford (sprinter)
- Oliver Ford (politician)
- Oliver Frederick Ford, English interior designer
