= Alfred Haywood =

American gridiron football player (born 1948)

No. 23
- Position: Running back

Personal information
- Born: August 6, 1948 (age 78); Jacksonville, Florida, U.S.
- Listed height: 5 ft 11 in (1.80 m)
- Listed weight: 215 lb (98 kg)

Career information
- High school: Matthew W. Gilbert (Jacksonville)
- College: Bethune–Cookman
- NFL draft: 1971: undrafted

Career history
- Miami Dolphins (1971)*; Jacksonville Sharks (1974); Jacksonville Express (1975); Denver Broncos (1975); Toronto Argonauts (1977)*
- * Offseason or practice squad member only

Career NFL statistics
- Games played: 2
- Stats at Pro Football Reference

Alfred Haywood (born August 6, 1948) is an American former professional football player who was a running back for one season in the National Football League (NFL) with the Denver Broncos. He played college football for the Bethune–Cookman Wildcats. He also played professionally for two seasons in the World Football League (WFL) as a member of the Jacksonville Sharks and Jacksonville Express.

== Early life and education ==
Born in Jacksonville, Florida, on August 6, 1948, Haywood attended high school at Matthew W. Gilbert, becoming one of three Gilbert attendees to play professionally. A two-sport star in baseball and football, he was offered professional baseball contracts from the Boston Braves and St. Louis Cardinals upon graduating high school. He opted to attend college, going to Bethune–Cookman University, serving as running back and kicker for their football team while playing catcher and slugger for their baseball team. He recorded 2,232 rushing yards and 1,411 receiving yards as the team's starting running back, and set a school record 52-yard field goal in 1970. He earned All-Conference honors in three consecutive years. He was described as "one of the best running backs in Bethune-Cookman College football history." In baseball, he had a .588 batting average, including 5 runs batted in and a home run.

== Professional career ==
After going unselected in the 1971 NFL draft, Haywood was given nine offers to play in the National Football League (NFL), the largest totaling over $125,000. He turned down the offers to pursue a career in professional baseball, saying "baseball was always my first love, even in high school. This was a very hard decision, because football is very much a part of me but baseball is in my heart." However, he was not signed in baseball and shortly afterwards accepted an offer by the Miami Dolphins to play football. He was released during training camp.

In 1974, after being out of football for two seasons, Haywood was signed to play for the Jacksonville Sharks of the newly formed World Football League (WFL). With the Sharks, he appeared in three games as a halfback, recording 20 rushes for 111 yards and 35 receiving yards on 7 receptions. He scored two touchdowns and also recorded one 1-point conversion.

When the Sharks folded in 1975, he joined the Jacksonville Express. He was their starting running back/fullback, appearing in 11 games. In a game against the San Antonio Wings, Haywood scored a game-winning 15-yard touchdown in overtime to win, 26–19. In a game vs. the Shreveport Steamer, he recorded over 120 yards to help his team win, 22–15. He finished the season with 131 rushes for 687 yards and 4 scores. As a receiver he scored two touchdowns on 12 receptions for 131 yards, with a long of 37.

When the remainder of the 1975 World Football League season was canceled, Haywood was acquired by the Denver Broncos of the National Football League (NFL). The signing was announced on November 11. To make room on the roster, the Broncos released rookie linebacker Mike Lemon. Though scheduled to appear in their game against the San Diego Chargers, Haywood would not appear in a game until December 14, in a 25–10 win over the Philadelphia Eagles. He would play in one other game, a 13–14 loss against the Miami Dolphins the next week. He recorded no statistics in his two games. In August 1976, he was released. A year later he was signed by the Toronto Argonauts of the Canadian Football League (CFL), but retired in June.
