= Charles C. Hughes Stadium =

Sports stadium in Sacramento, California

Hughes Stadium
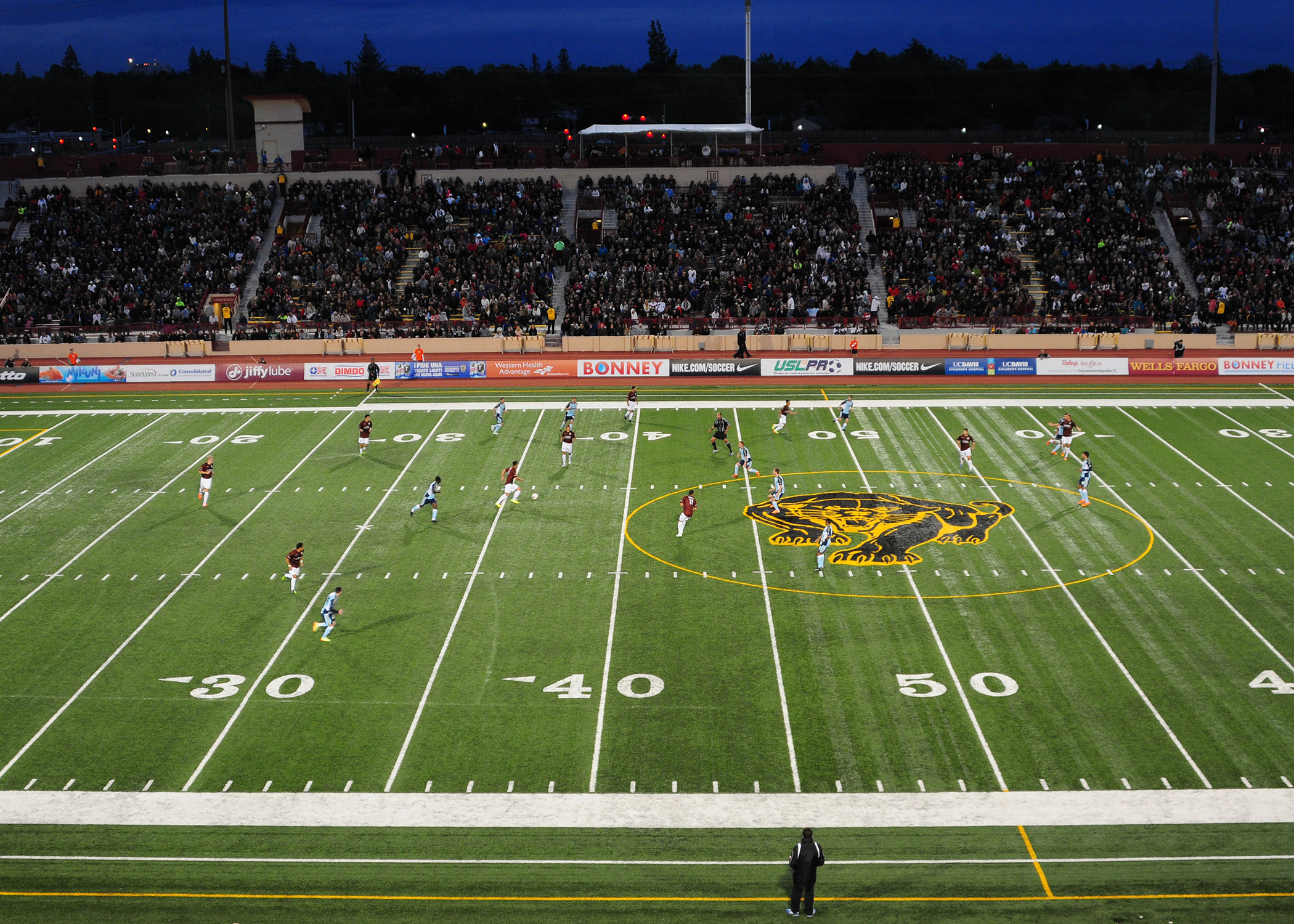
- Soccer game in 2014

- Location in the United States Location in California
- Interactive map of Hughes Stadium
- Full name: Charles C. Hughes Stadium
- Former names: Sacramento Stadium (1928–1944)
- Location: Sacramento, CA, U.S.
- Coordinates: 38.541°N 121.48652°W
- Elevation: 20 feet (6 m) AMSL
- Owner: Sacramento City College
- Capacity: 20,311
- Type: Stadium
- Surface: Natural grass (1928–2012); Artificial turf (2012–present)
- Current use: Football

Construction
- Opened: 1928; 98 years ago
- Renovated: 2012

Tenant
- Current: Sacramento City College teams: football (1928–present); Various regional high schools; Former: List: Cal Aggies football (1928–1931); Sacramento State football (1954–1968); Sacramento Republic (Jan–Jun 2014); NCAA Division II soccer championship (1973-1975)

Website
- scc.losrios.edu/hughes-stadium

Charles C. Hughes Stadium (commonly referred to as Hughes Stadium) is an outdoor stadium located at Sacramento City College in Sacramento, California. The stadium opened in 1928 and was initially known as "Sacramento Stadium" and "Sacramento College Stadium". It was renamed in November 1944 in honor of Charles Colfax Hughes, the first superintendent of the Sacramento City Unified School District, who died a month earlier.

In 2012, the stadium underwent a major overhaul, installing an artificial turf field surface, a new track surface, and a major refurbishment of the facilities. The current seating capacity is 20,311.

== Location ==
Hughes Stadium is located on the eastern portion of the Sacramento City College campus. The Union Pacific (ex Western Pacific) railroad tracks are to the east and Sutterville Road is to the south; its bridge over the tracks is visible from the western seats. The City College station of Sacramento Regional Transit District's Blue Line is to the northeast, and the stadium's parking lots are to the northwest and northeast.

The football field has a near north–south alignment, but slightly northwest-southeast. The open end of the U-shaped grandstand is to the south, with the scoreboard. The elevation of the field is approximately twenty feet (6 m) above sea level.

== Events and teams hosted ==
=== Football ===
==== Sacramento Surge ====
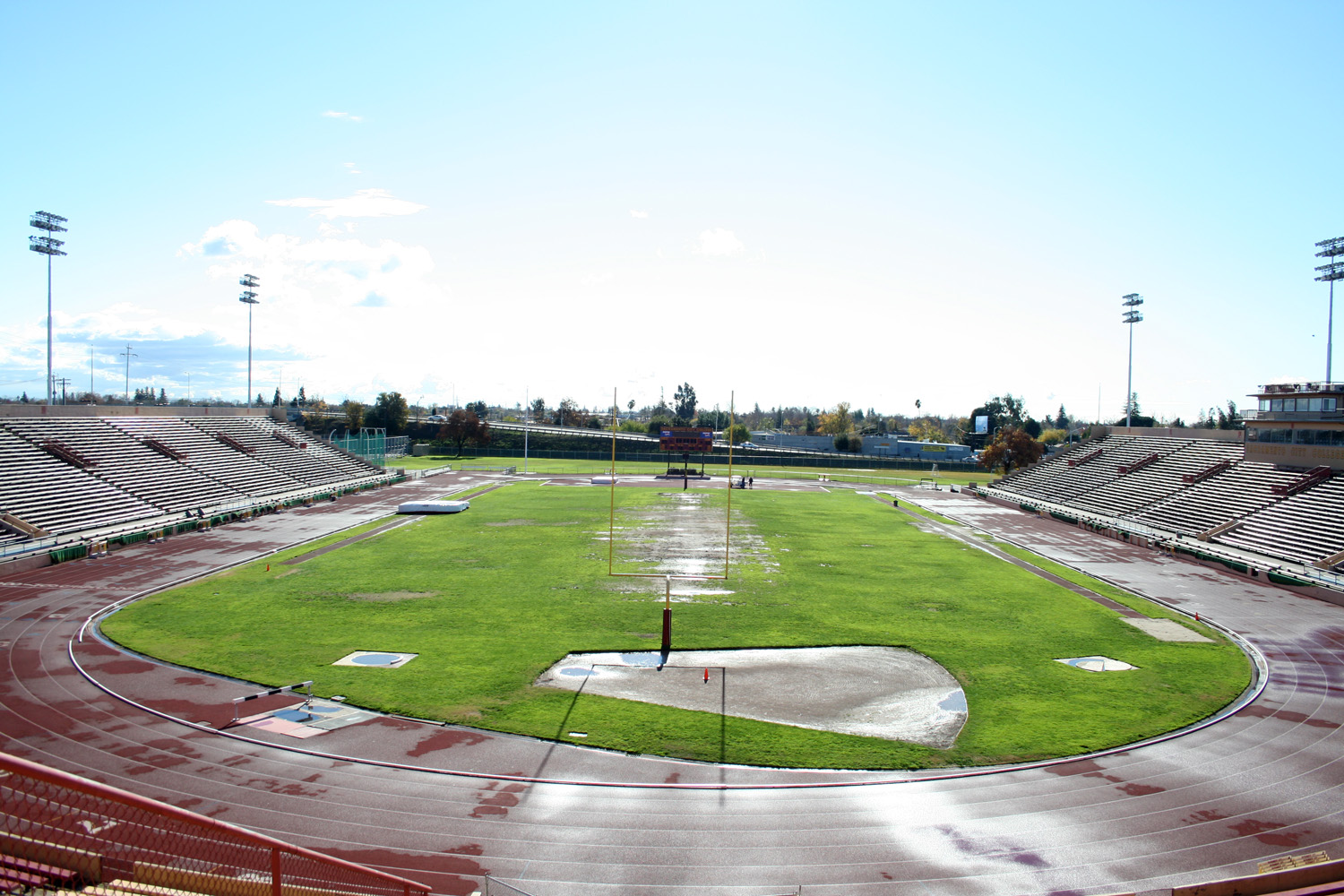
Hughes Stadium in 2007, prior to renovation

Former World League of American Football football team the Sacramento Surge, the only American team to ever win the World Bowl, played its inaugural season at Hughes Stadium in 1991, before relocating to Hornet Stadium on the Sacramento State University campus in 1992. The Sacramento Surge played five home games at Hughes Stadium, with ticket prices ranging from $40 to $100.

The Sacramento Surge, which played in the World League of American Football (WLAF) in 1991 and 1992, featured many notable football stars. The team was coached by Kay Stephenson, former Buffalo Bills quarterback and head coach, with Charlie Sumner as the defensive coordinator and Jim Haslett as the defensive assistant coach. Mike Keller served as General Manager, while Special Projects was led by Jack Youngblood, who also partnered with Joe Starkey and Ronnie Lott on the Surge radio broadcasts KRAK. Future professional wrestler Bill Goldberg also played for the team.

In 1992, the Surge played in the World Bowl. The Surge won the game, 21–17, behind quarterback David Archer's MVP performance (22 completions of 33 attempts for 286 yards, two touchdowns and one interception). The game would be the only World Bowl involving two North American-based WLAF teams, as well as the only World Bowl played on North American soil.

The Surge was owned by Fred Anderson, who, upon the WLAF going on hiatus after the 1992 season, continued Sacramento's professional football presence by forming the Sacramento Gold Miners, which played in the Canadian Football League for three years, albeit at Hornet Stadium.

==== Camellia Bowl ====
Hughes Stadium hosted sixteen college football bowl games known as the Camellia Bowl between 1961 and 1980. The first three games were for the NAIA national football championship. The 1964–72 games were one of four regional bowls that led up to a poll to determine the NCAA College Division championship, prior to the current Division II playoff structure, initiated in 1973. It was also the site of the third Division I-AA championship game in 1980, in which Boise State defeated defending champion Eastern Kentucky with a late touchdown in the fog on December 20.

==== Sacramento Capitols ====
The Sacramento Capitols of the Continental Football League used Hughes Stadium as their home field in 1968 and 1969, before the league folded.

==== Causeway Classic ====
Though Sacramento State and UC Davis traditionally switched stadiums for the annual Causeway Classic football game, Hughes Stadium was used as a third-party venue for several games in the 1970s, 1980s, 1990s, and last in 2002. It was the host of the famous "mud bowl" in 2000, where wind and rain was so strong that a UC Davis punt actually flew backwards during the game.

==== Pig Bowl ====
For many years the "Pig Bowl" was played at Hughes Stadium, an annual football game between police officers. The teams were composed of the Sacramento City Police Officers and the Sacramento County Sheriff's Deputies, and these games were mostly played in the 1970s.

==== Sacramento Mountain Lions ====
During the 2012 season, the Sacramento Mountain Lions of the United Football League used Hughes Stadium as their practice facility.

=== Sacramento Solons ===
The Sacramento Solons, a Triple-A Minor League Baseball team affiliated with the Milwaukee Brewers played three seasons in Hughes Stadium from 1974 to 1976. In 1976, the Solons' affiliation changed to the Texas Rangers. As a football and track stadium, the field was expectedly unsuitable for baseball, with a left field foul line reportedly at just 233 feet (71 m), or 17 feet shorter than the minimum requirement of 250 feet (76 m), but baseballs hit over the high screen were still counted as home runs. This photo, though somewhat exaggerated due to the zoom lens, provides a sense of the closeness of the left field area.

=== Track and field championships ===
Hughes Stadium was the site of the AAU National Championships in 1968; on the evening of June 20, Jim Hines, Ronnie Ray Smith, and Charlie Greene all bettered the world record (hand timed) of ten seconds in the 100 metres (and several others were very close), and is famous amongst track and field historians as the "Night of Speed." It was also host to the 1995 NCAA Men's Outdoor Track and Field Championships as well as several other championship events. The stadium was the host of most long-distance races at the 2011 World Masters Athletics Championships .

Hughes Stadium was one of the regular sites that would host the California Interscholastic Federation State Track and Field Championships on a rotational basis. The meet was held on ten different occasions from 1979 to 2007. (1979, 1982, 1985, 1987, 1997, 1999, 2001, 2004, 2005, 2007)

=== Boxing ===
On September 9, 1978, Pete Ranzany fought for the world (WBA) welterweight title against champion José "Pipino" Cuevas. A crowd of over 17,000 saw Cuevas knock out Ranzany in the second round.

=== Motor racing ===
Hughes Stadium's track has been used for Midget car racing. The track was also used for Speedway Motorcycle Races in 1957 and 1958.

=== Sacramento Republic FC ===
The expansion USL Pro soccer club Sacramento Republic FC played the first few home games of 2014 at Hughes Stadium, where their per-game attendance dwarfed that of the rest of the league, and where they recorded three sellouts. The team left Hughes in June 2014 for Bonney Field, a newly built facility in Cal Expo with a full-sized soccer field and lower capacity.

=== Concerts ===
==== Sacramento Pop Festival ====
The Sacramento Pop Festival was held at Hughes in 1967 on Sunday, October 15, headlined by Jefferson Airplane, Nitty Gritty Dirt Band, Strawberry Alarm Clock, and The Sunshine Company. It was held four months after the Monterey Pop Festival.

==== Pink Floyd ====
In 1988, Hughes Stadium was the venue for Pink Floyd during their Momentary Lapse of Reason tour, with a sold-out crowd of 27,000 on April 20.

==== Doobie Brothers/Santana ====
On August 16, 1981, 21,041 fans attended the "Rockin' the Capital" concert, according to Billboard Magazine. The Doobie Brothers headlined the concert and were joined by Santana, Rick Springfield, Gamma and Ranger.

Preceded by Orlando Stadium	Host of the NCAA Div. I football championship 1980	Succeeded by Memorial Stadium (WF)
