= Oliver Ford (sprinter) =

American sprinter

Oliver Ford (born 27 March 1947) is a retired sprinter who jointly held the 100 metres world record with six other men in 1968, at 10.0s. He matched the then-record in the semi-finals of the National Association of Intercollegiate Athletics track and field championships in Albuquerque, New Mexico and won the final with a time of 10.1s.

He studied at Southern University, where he was coached by Richard A. Hill, and normally ran 220 yards and 440 yards. After his record run he planned to try for the Olympics, but was ill for the Olympics trials in July 1968, though he was selected to compete at the final selection in Echo Summit that September. He won both the 100-yard dash (in 9.5s) and the 220 yard dash (in 20.5s) at the 1969 NAIA championships in Billings, Montana, where he was named outstanding athlete.

In 1999, he was inducted into the Southern University Hall of Fame.
