= Roscoe Divine =

American track and field athlete

Personal information
- Born: November 3, 1947
- Died: September 17, 2026 (aged 78)

Sport
- Country: United States
- Sport: Athletics
- Coached by: Bill Bowerman

Achievements and titles
- Personal bests: 1500 m: 3:41.2; Mile: 3:56.3h

Roscoe Divine (November 3, 1947 – September 17, 2026) was an American track and field athlete. He was known primarily as a miler but excelled in shorter distances like the 880 yard (800 meters) and the steeplechase.

He ran track for the University of Oregon under coach Bill Bowerman. He was part of a collection of sub-4 minute milers that collected around Bowerman when the number of people accomplishing the feat was relatively small. He lettered in track in 1967, 1968, 1969, and 1970. He lettered in cross country in 1969 and was the runner-up in the 1500 meters at the 1968 USA Outdoor Track and Field Championships.

He was ranked in the United States top 10 five times, the best being #3 in 1967.

== Records ==
- 1968 World Record holder : 4-mile relay (Oregon Track Club)
  Roscoe Divine (4:03.2) (USA)
  Wade Bell (4:01.0) (USA)
  Arne Kvalheim (4:03.3) (NOR)
  David Wilborn (3:57.5) (USA)
  16:05.0
