= Paul Nash (athlete) =

South African sprinter

Personal information
- Nationality: South African
- Born: 20 January 1947 (age 79)

Sport
- Sport: Athletics
- Event: Sprints

Paul Nash (born 20 January 1947) is a South African sprinter who tied the 100-metre world record four times in 1968 with a time of 10.0 seconds.

== Biography ==
Nash attended Michaelhouse school in the province of KwaZulu-Natal, South Africa.

Nash won the British AAA Championships titles in both the 100 yards and 220 yards event at the 1966 AAA Championships.

In 1967 Nash competed against Jim Hines of the United States in Los Angeles when he finished third in a hand-timed 10.4 with Hines in 10.2. The next year Nash, aged 21, was in fine form and during the South African athletics season in the early months of 1968 media attention focussed intensively on Nash's prospects of breaking the world handtimed record of 10.0. A specially constituted athletics meeting was held on 2 April 1968 at the Krugersdorp stadium located 20 km to the west of Johannesburg (subsequently renamed the [Bob van Reenan] which was run down by Kaiser Chiefs football club and is now standing in ruins ( on the west the Johannesburg to allow Nash another opportunity to challenge the record. Nash duly ran his most celebrated race, when he equalled what was then the world record of 10.00. Conditions were not ideal for sprinting on the cinder track then laid at the stadium as it had rained in the afternoon. Nash's record attempt nevertheless generated great excitement and approximately 16,000 people crowded into the stadium to watch Nash run. The stadium was so crowded that the announcer was compelled to ask spectators to move their feet from the outer perimeter of the track.

He was ranked third in the world over 100-metre behind Jim Hines and Lennox Miller of Jamaica by Track and Field News in 1968. Hines won the Olympic title at high altitude in Mexico City in 1968 in a world record electronic time of 9.95 with Miller second.

Nash won another two British AAA title over 100 and 220 yards at the 1968 AAA Championships.

In July 1968 he recorded an unprecedented sprint double of 10.0 for the 100 metres and 20.1 in the 200 metres within an hour in Zurich. Shortly thereafter, he suffered a complete breakdown of his health and ability to train and compete as a result of what has subsequently been diagnosed as reactive arthritis, a condition which attacks young people under stress impairing their immune systems.

Despite being offered numerous athletics scholarships to various United States Colleges, the strongly independent-minded Nash chose instead to enroll for a Bachelor of Commerce degree at the University of Witwatersrand in Johannesburg. After graduating, he channelled the focus that enabled him to equal the world record into the family business and has had a successful and varied career in commerce. He is now chairman of Sable Holding Pty Limited, a property investment and management company, and has also amongst other things operated an aviation company, Astro Helicopters and a road-freight business.

Sportswriter, coach and former Springbok athlete, Jan Barnard, and Nash himself interviewed in early 2011, believe that had he been given the opportunity, but for the sports boycott of South Africa because of its apartheid policies, that he would have beaten Jim Hines in the Olympic final in Mexico City in 1968.
