= Best Funeral Ever =

Television series

- Genre: Reality television
- Starring: John Beckwith, Jr.
- Country of origin: United States
- Original language: English
- No. of seasons: 2
- No. of episodes: 8

Production
- Running time: 22 minutes
- Production company: Park Slope Productions

Original release
- Network: TLC
- Release: January 6, 2013 – May 26, 2014

Best Funeral Ever is an American reality television series that aired on the TLC cable network for two seasons, beginning January 6, 2013.

The show took place at the Golden Gate Funeral Home in Dallas, Texas, a Black American family-operated business, and centered primarily on over-the-top and extravagant funerals carried out by the families of the recently deceased.

One notable funeral was that of Ronnie Ray Smith, a gold medal winner at the 1968 Summer Olympics (his funeral featured his casket "running" a 100-yard dash and being given a gold medal at the end).

== Episodes ==
Season	Episodes	Originally released	
Season	Episodes	First released	Last released
1	5	January 6, 2013	December 9, 2013
2	3	May 19, 2014	May 26, 2014

=== Season 1 (2013) ===
No. overall	No. in season	Title	Original release date
1	1	"Pilot"	January 6, 2013
2	2	"Bowling/Wedding Funeral"	December 2, 2013
3	3	"Breakfast/Olympics Funeral"	December 2, 2013
4	4	"Candy/Hollywood Funeral"	December 9, 2013
5	5	"Horror/Game Show Funeral"	December 9, 2013

=== Season 2 (2014) ===
No. overall	No. in season	Title	Original release date
6	1	"Hollywood/Western Funeral"	May 19, 2014
7	2	"Boxing/Hawaii Funeral"	May 19, 2014
8	3	"Country Music Funeral"	May 26, 2014
