= Bob Hayes =

American football player and sprinter (1942–2002)

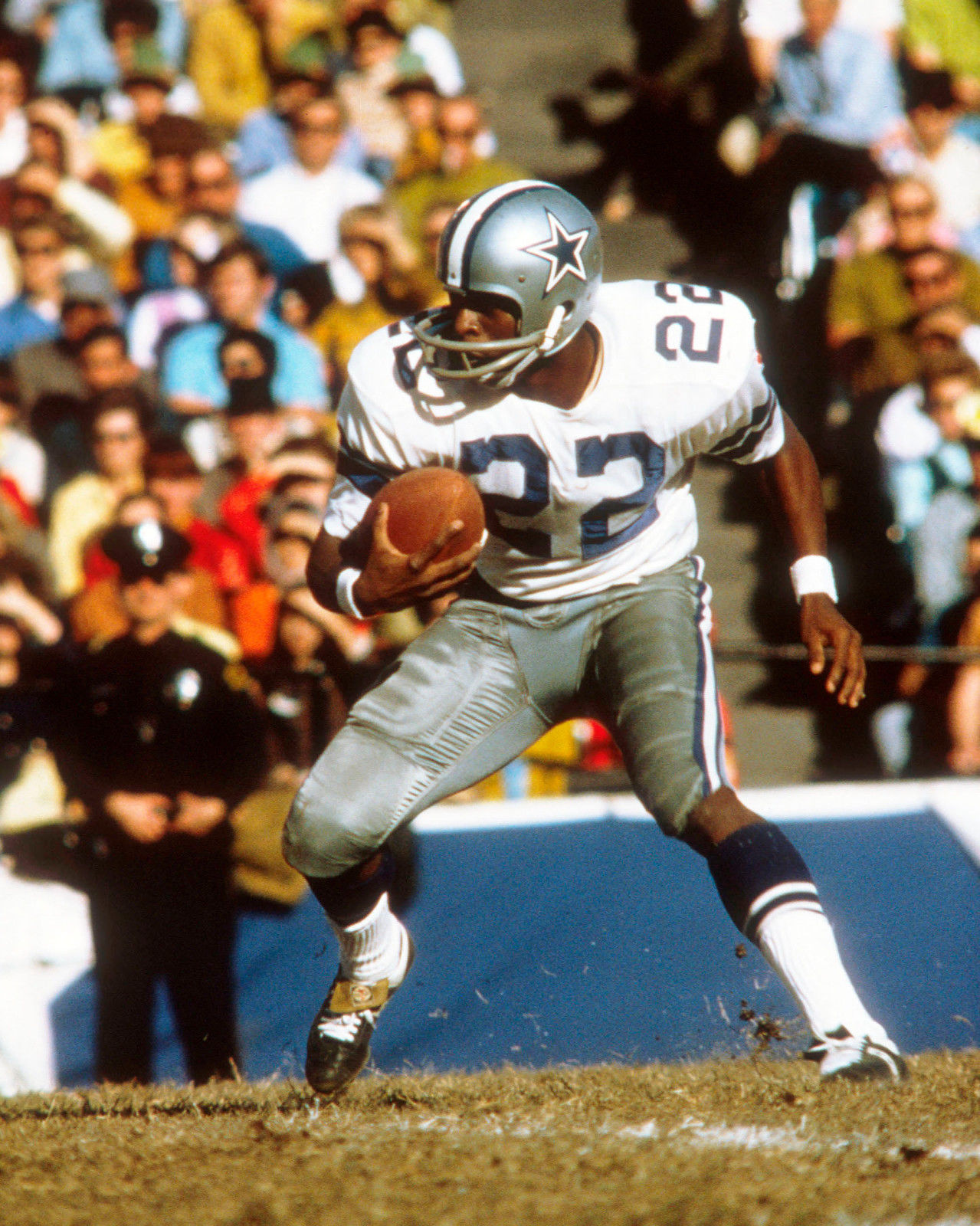

No. 22
- Position: Wide receiver

Personal information
- Born: December 20, 1942; Jacksonville, Florida, U.S.
- Died: September 18, 2002 (aged 59); Jacksonville, Florida, U.S.
- Listed height: 6 ft 0 in (1.83 m)
- Listed weight: 187 lb (85 kg)

Career information
- High school: Matthew Gilbert (Jacksonville)
- College: Florida A&M (1962–1964)
- NFL draft: 1964: 7th round, 88th overall pick
- AFL draft: 1964: 14th round, 105th overall pick

Career history
- Dallas Cowboys (1965–1974); San Francisco 49ers (1975)

Awards and highlights
- Super Bowl champion (VI); 2× First-team All-Pro (1966, 1968); 2× Second-team All-Pro (1965, 1967); 3× Pro Bowl (1965–1967); 2× NFL receiving touchdowns leader (1965, 1966); Dallas Cowboys Ring of Honor; AP small college national champion (1962)

Career NFL statistics
- Receptions: 371
- Receiving yards: 7,414
- Receiving touchdowns: 71
- Stats at Pro Football Reference
- Pro Football Hall of Fame
- Sports career
- Sport: Track and field
- Events: 100 metres 200 metres 4 × 100 metres
- Club: MVP Track & Field Club

Sports achievements and titles
- Personal bests: 60 yd: 5.9h (Note: Former World Record) 70 yd: 6.9h WR; 100 yd: 9.1h (St. Louis, 1963); 100 m: 10.0h (Tokyo, 1964); 200 m: 20.5h (Coral Gables, 1963); 220 yd: 20.6h (Coral Gables, 1963) 4 × 100 m: 39.06 (Tokyo, 1964)
Medal record
Men's athletics
Representing the United States
Olympic Games
Gold medal – first place	1964 Tokyo	100 m
Gold medal – first place	1964 Tokyo	4 × 100 m relay

Robert Lee Hayes (December 20, 1942 – September 18, 2002), nicknamed "Bullet Bob", was an American sprinter and professional football player. After winning gold medals at the 1964 Summer Olympics, he played as a split end in the National Football League (NFL) for the Dallas Cowboys (for 11 seasons). Hayes is the only athlete to win both an Olympic gold medal and a Super Bowl ring. He was a two-sport standout in college in both track and field and football at Florida A&M University. Hayes was enshrined in the Dallas Cowboys Ring of Honor in 2001 and was selected for induction in the Pro Football Hall of Fame in January 2009. Hayes is the second Olympic gold medalist to be inducted to the Pro Football Hall of Fame, after Jim Thorpe.

Hayes formerly held the Olympic and world record for the 100-meter dash with a time of 10.0 seconds, and was part of the team that held the 4 × 100 meters world record with a time of 39.0 seconds, both set at the 1964 Tokyo Olympics. He also held the world record in the 60-yard, 70-yard, 100-yard, and 220-yard dashes. He was inducted into the United States Olympic Hall of Fame.

== Early life ==
Hayes attended Matthew Gilbert High School in Jacksonville, where he was a halfback on the football team. The 1958 Gilbert High Panthers finished 12–0, winning the Florida High School Athletic Association black school state championship with a 14–7 victory over Dillard High School of Fort Lauderdale before more than 11,000 spectators. In times of racial segregation laws, their achievement went basically unnoticed, until 50 years later when they were recognized as one of the best teams in Florida High School Athletic Association (FHSAA) history.

== College career ==
A highly recruited athlete, Hayes accepted a football scholarship from Florida A&M University, a historically black college, where he excelled in track and field.

In 1962, the University of Miami invited him to a meet on their campus, where he tied the world record of 9.2 seconds in the 100-yard dash, which had been set by Frank Budd of Villanova University the previous year. He also was the first person to break six seconds in the 60-yard dash with his indoor world record of 5.9 seconds.

In 1963, he broke the 100-yard dash record with a time of 9.1 seconds, a mark that would not be broken for eleven years until Ivory Crockett ran a 9.0 in 1974. The same year, Hayes set the world best for 200 meters (20.5 seconds, although the time was never ratified) and ran the 220-yard dash in a time of 20.6 seconds (while running into an 8 mph (3.6 m/s) wind). He was selected to represent the United States in the 1964 Summer Olympics in Tokyo. His football coach Jake Gaither was not very high on giving Hayes time to train, which caused then president Lyndon B. Johnson to call him and insist he allow Hayes time off and to keep him healthy. Hayes' running form was considered unusual for a sprinter due to his long strides and large frame.

He was the AAU 100-yard dash champion three years running, from 1962 to 1964, and in 1964 was the NCAA champion in the 200-meter dash. He missed part of his senior year because of his Olympic bid for the gold medal.

In 1976, he was inducted into the inaugural class of the Florida A&M University Sports Hall of Fame. In 1996, he was inducted into the Southern Intercollegiate Athletic Conference Hall of Fame. In 2011, he was inducted into the Black College Football Hall of Fame.

== Olympics ==
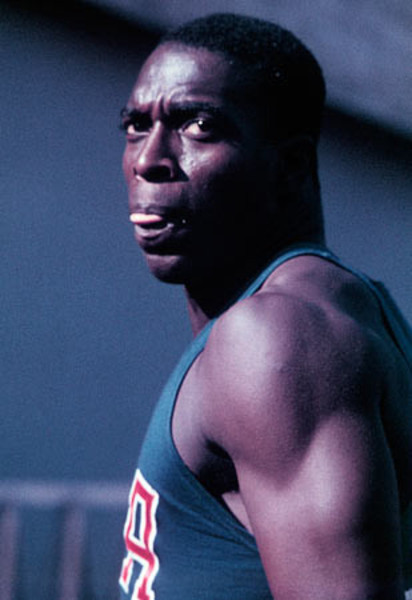
Hayes at the 1964 Olympics

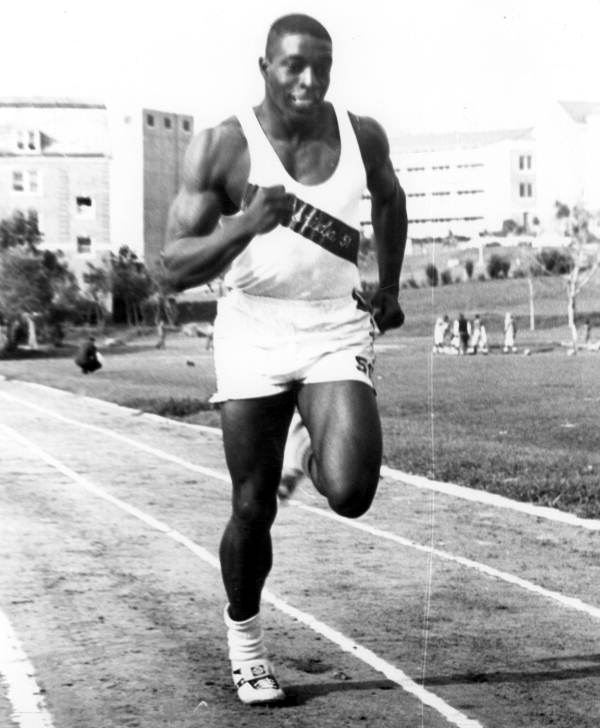
At FAMU in 1962

At the 1964 Summer Olympics, in Tokyo, Hayes won the 100 m and in doing so tied the then world record in the 100 m with a time of 10.0 seconds. Until the Tokyo Olympics, world records were measured by officials with stopwatches, measured to the nearest tenth of a second; fully automatic timing was used in Tokyo, but the times were recorded as "hand-timed" by subtracting 0.05 seconds from the automatic time and rounding to the nearest tenth of a second. Officials with stopwatches had measured Hayes' time to be 9.9 seconds, but his automatically-timed 10.06 seconds was converted to 10.0 seconds. Hayes ran in lane 1 which had been used for the 20 km racewalk the previous day and this badly damaged the cinder track, and ran in borrowed spikes because one of his shoes had been kicked under the bed when he was playing with some friends and he didn't realize until he got there.

Hayes won another gold medal in the 4 × 100-meter relay, setting a new world record at 39.06 seconds with team-mates Paul Drayton, Gerry Ashworth, and Richard Stebbins. Hayes ran the anchor leg in a come-from-behind win for the US team. Hand-timed between 8.5 and 8.9 seconds, his relay leg is one of the fastest in history. Jocelyn Delecour, France's anchor leg runner, famously said to Paul Drayton before the relay final that, "You can't win, all you have is Bob Hayes." Drayton was able to reply afterwards, "That's all we need." The race was also Hayes' last as a track and field athlete, as he permanently switched to football after it, aged only 21.

In some of the first meets to be timed with experimental fully automatic timing, Hayes was the first man to break the ten-second barrier for the 100 meters, albeit with a 5.3 m/s wind assistance in the semi-finals of the 1964 Olympics. His time was recorded at 9.91 seconds. Jim Hines officially broke 10 seconds at the high altitude of Mexico City, Mexico in 1968 with a wind-legal 9.95s which stood as the world record for almost 15 years. Hayes' low-altitude record was equaled by Hasely Crawford in 1976 and broken by Carl Lewis in 1984.

== Professional football career ==
=== Dallas Cowboys ===
The Dallas Cowboys selected Hayes in the seventh round (88th overall) of the 1964 NFL draft with a future draft pick, which allowed the team to draft him before his college eligibility was over, taking a chance that the Olympic sprinter with unrefined football skills could excel as a wide receiver. Hayes wore No. 22 with the Cowboys, which would later be worn by running back Emmitt Smith. He was also selected by the Denver Broncos in the 14th round (105th overall) of the 1964 AFL draft as a future selection. Hayes has been credited by many with forcing the NFL to develop a zone defense and the bump and run to attempt to contain him.

Hayes' first two seasons were successful, during which he led the NFL both times in receiving touchdowns with 12 and 13 touchdowns, respectively. In 1966 Hayes caught six passes for 195 yards against the New York Giants at the Cotton Bowl. Later, in the Dallas Cowboys-Washington Redskins match-up, Hayes caught nine passes for 246 yards (a franchise record until Miles Austin broke it with a 250-yard performance on October 11, 2009, against the Kansas City Chiefs). Hayes' speed forced other teams to go to a zone since no single player could keep up with him. Spreading the defense out in hopes of containing Hayes allowed the Cowboys' talented running game to flourish, rushers Don Perkins, Calvin Hill, Walt Garrison and Duane Thomas taking advantage of the diminished coverage at the line of scrimmage. In the 1967 season, Hayes led the NFL in punt return yards, and went on to set an NFL playoff record with 141 punt return yards in Dallas' 52-14 win over the Cleveland Browns. Hayes also caught 5 passes for 145 yards in that game, including an 86-yard touchdown catch.

Hayes is also known for two events, both involving the NFL championship games in 1966 and 1967 against the Green Bay Packers. In the 1966 game, on the last meaningful play of the game, Hayes missed an assignment of blocking linebacker Dave Robinson, which resulted in Don Meredith nearly being sacked by Robinson and as a result throwing a desperation pass into the end zone that was intercepted by Tom Brown. In the 1967 NFL championship, the "Ice Bowl" played on New Year's Eve, 1967, Hayes was alleged to have inadvertently disclosed whether the upcoming play was a pass or run because on running plays he kept his hands inside his pants to keep them warm and the Green Bay defense knew they didn't need to cover him.

On July 17, 1975, he was traded to the San Francisco 49ers in exchange for a third round draft choice (#73-Duke Fergerson).

=== San Francisco 49ers ===
In the 1975 season with the San Francisco 49ers, Hayes teamed up with Gene Washington in the starting lineup. After not playing up to expectations in the first five games, he was waived on October 22 to make room for wide receiver Terry Beasley.

=== Multiple offensive threat ===
In addition to receiving, Hayes returned punts for the Cowboys and was the NFL's leading punt returner in 1968 with a 20.8 yards per return average and two touchdowns, including a 90 yarder against the Pittsburgh Steelers. He was named to the Pro Bowl three times and First-team All-Pro twice and Second-team All-Pro twice. He helped Dallas win five Eastern Conference titles, two NFC titles, played in two Super Bowls, and was instrumental in Dallas' first-ever Super Bowl victory after the 1971 season, making Hayes the only person to win both an Olympic gold medal and a Super Bowl ring. Later in his career, as defenses improved playing zone and the bump and run was refined, Hayes' value was as a decoy rather than a deep threat.

=== Cowboy records ===
Hayes was the second player (after Franklin Clarke) in the history of the Dallas Cowboys franchise to surpass 1,000 yards (ground or air) in a single season, and he did that in his rookie year by finishing with 1,003 yards. Also during his rookie year, he led the team with 46 receptions and set franchise records for total touchdowns (13) and total receiving touchdowns (12). He finished his 11-year career with 371 receptions for 7,414 yards and 71 touchdowns, giving him an impressive 20 yards per catch average (his yards per catch average remains a franchise record, while his touchdown reception record stood until 2017, when it was broken by Dez Bryant.) He also rushed for 68 yards on 24 carries and two touchdowns, gained 581 yards on 23 kickoff returns, and returned 104 punts for 1,158 yards and three touchdowns.

In 1965 he also started a streak (1965–1966) of seven consecutive games with at least a touchdown catch, which still stands as a Cowboys record shared with Franklin Clarke (1961–1962), Terrell Owens (2007) and Dez Bryant (2012).

His 7,295 receiving yards are the sixth-most in Dallas Cowboys history. Hayes holds ten regular-season receiving records, four punt return records, and 22 overall franchise records, making him one of the greatest receivers to ever play for the Cowboys.

In 2004, he was named to the Professional Football Researchers Association Hall of Very Good in the association's second HOVG class.

== NFL career statistics ==
Legend
	Won the Super Bowl
	Led the league
**Bold**	Career high

=== Regular season ===
Year	Team	Games		Receiving					Rushing					Kick returns					Punt returns				
Year	Team	GP	GS	Rec	Yds	Avg	Lng	TD	Att	Yds	Avg	Lng	TD	Ret	Yds	Avg	Lng	TD	Ret	Yds	Avg	Lng	TD
1965	DAL	13	13	46	1,003	21.8	82	12	**4**	-8	-2.0	11	**1**	**17**	**450**	26.5	**66**	0	12	153	12.8	47	0
1966	DAL	**14**	**14**	**64**	**1,232**	19.3	**95**	**13**	1	-1	-1.0	-1	0	0	–	–	–	–	17	106	6.2	18	0
1967	DAL	13	13	49	998	20.4	64	10	0	–	–	–	–	1	17	17.0	17	0	**24**	276	11.5	69	1
1968	DAL	**14**	**14**	53	909	17.2	54	10	**4**	2	0.5	6	0	1	20	20.0	20	0	15	**312**	**20.8**	**90**	**2**
1969	DAL	10	10	40	746	18.7	67	4	**4**	17	4.3	8	0	3	80	**26.7**	46	0	18	179	9.9	50	0
1970	DAL	13	9	34	889	**26.1**	89	10	**4**	**34**	**8.5**	**13**	**1**	0	–	–	–	–	15	116	7.7	34	0
1971	DAL	**14**	13	35	840	24.0	85	8	3	18	6.0	11	0	1	14	14.0	14	0	1	5	5.0	5	0
1972	DAL	12	5	15	200	13.3	29	0	2	8	4.0	7	0	0	–	–	–	–	0	–	–	–	–
1973	DAL	13	13	22	360	16.4	47	3	0	–	–	–	–	0	–	–	–	–	0	–	–	–	–
1974	DAL	12	0	7	118	16.9	35	1	0	–	–	–	–	0	–	–	–	–	2	11	5.5	6	0
1975	SF	4	3	6	119	19.8	36	0	2	-2	-1.0	-1	0	0	–	–	–	–	0	–	–	–	–
Career		132	107	371	7,414	20.0	95	71	24	68	2.8	13	2	23	581	25.3	66	0	104	1,158	11.1	90	3

=== Postseason ===
Year	Team	Games		Receiving					Rushing					Kick returns					Punt returns				
Year	Team	GP	GS	Rec	Yds	Avg	Lng	TD	Att	Yds	Avg	Lng	TD	Ret	Yds	Avg	Lng	TD	Ret	Yds	Avg	Lng	TD
1966	DAL	1	1	1	1	1.0	1	0	0	–	–	–	–	0	–	–	–	–	3	-9	-3.0	1	0
1967	DAL	2	2	**8**	**160**	20.0	**86**	**1**	0	–	–	–	–	0	–	–	–	–	3	**141**	**47.0**	**68**	0
1968	DAL	1	1	5	83	16.6	29	0	0	–	–	–	–	0	–	–	–	–	0	–	–	–	–
1969	DAL	1	1	4	44	11.0	17	0	0	–	–	–	–	0	–	–	–	–	0	–	–	–	–
1970	DAL	**3**	**3**	2	61	**30.5**	41	0	0	–	–	–	–	**1**	**16**	**16.0**	**16**	0	**4**	17	4.3	8	0
1971	DAL	**3**	**3**	7	76	10.9	18	**1**	**1**	**16**	**16.0**	**16**	0	0	–	–	–	–	2	2	2.0	3	0
1972	DAL	2	0	1	13	13.0	13	0	0	–	–	–	–	0	–	–	–	–	0	–	–	–	–
1973	DAL	2	2	3	54	18.0	29	0	0	–	–	–	–	0	–	–	–	–	0	–	–	–	–
Career		15	13	31	492	15.9	86	2	1	16	16.0	16	0	1	16	16.0	16	0	12	151	12.6	68	0

== Legal troubles ==
In March 1979, Hayes was convicted in Texas of 3 charges of selling drugs to an undercover officer and sentenced to five years. Two of the three charges were overturned upon appeal, and he was released due to good behavior after serving 10 months in prison. He continued to battle drug and alcohol problems and went to rehab on three occasions. Hayes moved back to Jacksonville in the mid-1990s to live with his parents and returned to Florida A&M and completed work on his bachelor's degree in elementary education in 1994. He spent much of his time speaking out against drug abuse and urging athletes to work toward their college degree.

== Death ==
On September 18, 2002, Hayes died in his hometown of Jacksonville of kidney failure, after battling prostate cancer and liver ailments.

== Pro Football Hall of Fame ==
=== 2004 controversy ===
Hayes was close to being inducted into the Pro Football Hall of Fame in 2004, but was denied the opportunity in the final round of decision-making. The decision was marred by controversy, with many claiming that the Hall of Fame Senior Selection Committee had a bias against members of the Dallas Cowboys and other NFL teams. Others believe Hayes' legal and drug use issues marred his chances. Shortly after the announcement of the new 2004 Hall of Fame members, long-time Sports Illustrated writer Paul Zimmerman resigned from the Selection Committee in protest of the decision to leave Hayes out of the Hall. Zimmerman eventually returned as a Hall of Fame voter.

=== 2009 induction ===
On August 27, 2008, Hayes was named as one of two senior candidates for the 2009 Hall of Fame election. On Saturday, January 31, 2009, he was selected as a member of the Pro Football Hall of Fame's Class of 2009.

The next day, Lucille Hester, who claimed to be Hayes's sister, released a letter she said he had drafted three years before he died, on October 29, 1999, in case he did not live to see his induction. Its full text read:

You know I am not sure I am going to be around if I get into the Pro Football Hall of Fame so you must read this for me, I am not sure, I guess I am feeling sorry for myself at this time but you must remember everything I want you to do and say. Mother said you would do what I want because you always did. So read this for me.

I would like to thank everyone who supported me to get into the NFL Hall of Fame, the Dallas Cowboys organization, all of my team mates and everyone who played for the Cowboys, (thank the San Francisco 49rs [sic] too). Thank the fans all around the country and the world, thank the committee who voted for me and also the ones who may did not vote for me, thank Mother and my family, thank Roger Stauback [sic] and tell all my teammates I love them dearly.

Thank the Pro Football Hall of Fame, all the NFL teams and players, Florida A&M University, thank everyone who went to Mathew [sic] Gilbert High School, thank everyone in Jacksonville and Florida and everyone especially on the East Side of Jacksonville. Thank everyone in the City of Dallas and in Texas and just thank everyone in the whole world.

I love you all.

Delivered by Hester in front of hundreds and a national cable television audience, the moment was described as "... one of the most compelling and touching scenes the Hall of Fame has seen." Shortly after, it was discovered that the supposedly signed letter was printed in the Calibri font, which was not released to the public until five years after Hayes' death. Some family members disputed Lucille Hester's claim to be related to Bob, and took steps to ensure she was not part of the Hall of Fame ceremony.

On August 8, 2009, Hayes was inducted into the Pro Football Hall of Fame. Roger Staubach, Hayes' Dallas Cowboys teammate, along with Hayes' son Bob Hayes Jr., unveiled the bust, which was sculpted by Scott Myers. On hand were six members of Bob's Gilbert High School championship team. He was later inducted into the Texas Track and Field Coaches Hall of Fame, Class of 2017.
