= Matthew Gilbert High School =

Location
- Coordinates: 30.3411°N 81.6397°W

Information
- Former name: Franklin Street Public School #146 (1928–1944)
- Type: Public, segregated
- Opened: 1928
- Closed: 1970
- Last updated: 31 December 2017

Matthew Gilbert High School was a high school for black students in Jacksonville, Florida. Like many black high schools of the time, it was reclassified as a junior high school after integration. It is now Matthew Gilbert Middle School.

== Athletics ==
The Gilbert Panthers went undefeated (11–0) and won the FIAA State Football championship in 1958.

== Notable alumni ==
- Henry Lee Adams Jr., first African-American judge in the middle district of Florida.
- Bob Hayes, Olympic sprinter, NFL Wide Receiver, the only athlete to win both an Olympic gold medal and a Super Bowl ring.
