= Echo Summit =

Mountain pass

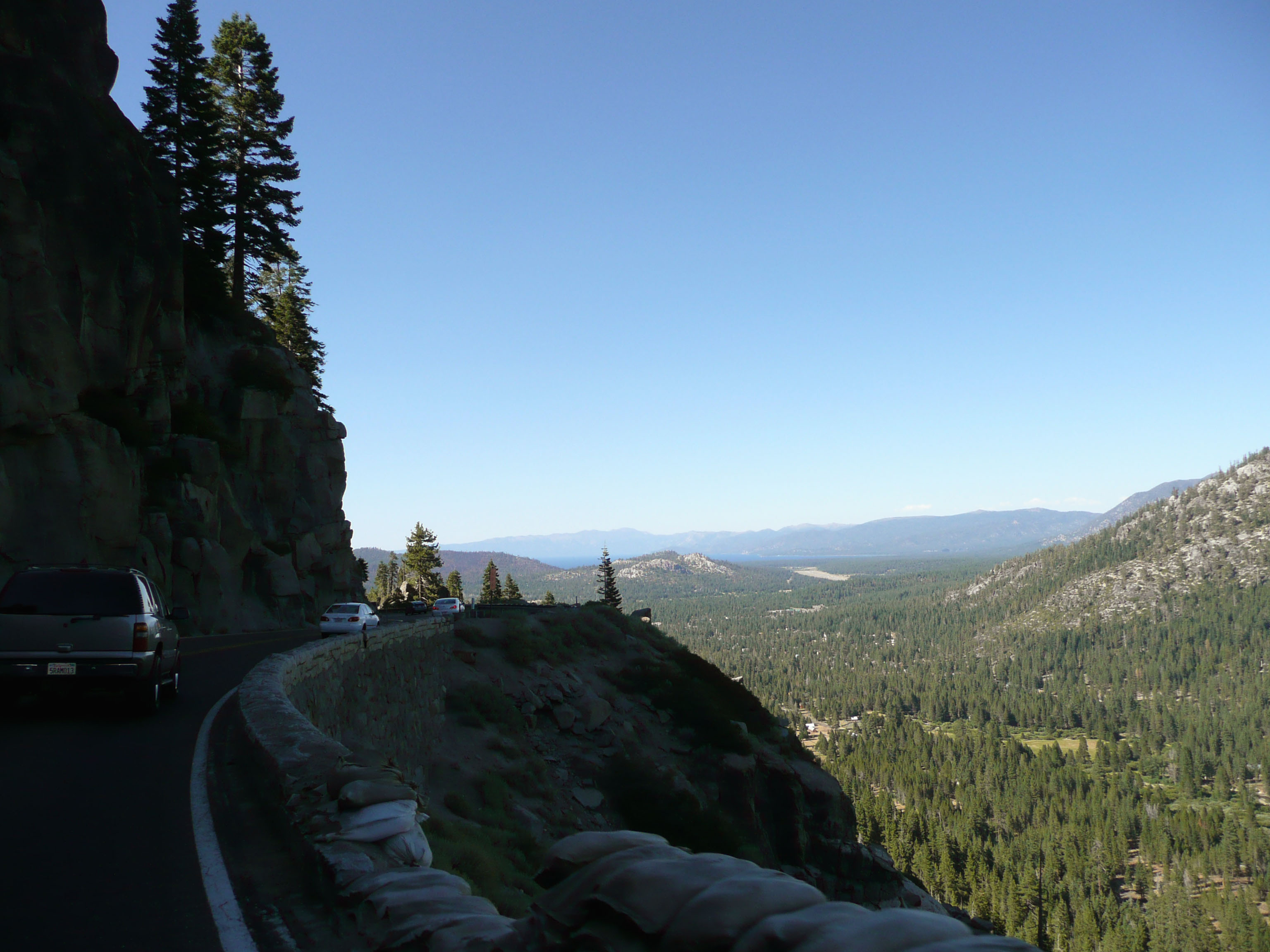
- View from Echo Summit towards Lake Tahoe.
- Interactive map of Echo Summit
- Elevation: 7,382 ft (2,250 m)
- Traversed by: US 50

Third Approach
- Location: El Dorado County, California, U.S.
- Range: Sierra Nevada
- Coordinates: 38.813°N 120.030°W
- Topo map

California Historical Landmark
- Reference no.: 1048

Location in California

Echo Summit is a mountain pass over the Sierra Nevada in the western United States, located in eastern El Dorado County, California. At 7,377 ft (2,249 m) above sea level, it is the highest point on U.S. Route 50 in California, which traverses it at postmile 66.48 between Twin Bridges and Meyers, south of Lake Tahoe.

The "Sierra Nevada Southern Route" (a.k.a. the "Pioneer Route") of the Lincoln Highway, the first road across the United States, was routed over nearby Johnson Pass in 1913. The current alignment over Echo Summit was constructed between 1936 and 1939.

The "Sierra Nevada Northern Route" of the Lincoln Highway went over Donner Pass.

Echo Summit is a trailhead for the Pacific Crest National Scenic Trail.

== 1968 U.S. Olympic Trials ==
Echo Summit is notable for being the location (sometimes listed as "South Lake Tahoe") of the 1968 U.S. Olympic track and field trials for men, held September 6–16, a month before the 1968 Olympics in Mexico City. (The women's trials were at low altitude in Los Angeles County, at Walnut.) The Echo Summit site opened in July as a training camp for high-altitude acclimation, with an elevation similar to the Olympic Stadium in Mexico. The picturesque alpine location was on the cover of the July 1968 issue of Track and Field News. The original men's trials were in Los Angeles in late June, but a second round of trials was added to the training camp.

With a motel tax and financial support from Harrah's Tahoe casino, a synthetic Tartan track was purchased which was very similar to that to be used in Mexico City. Installation was completed in early July and was designed to be easily dismantled and reinstalled, being moved the following summer to nearby South Tahoe Middle School where it survived until 2006. Installed southwest of the summit in the parking lot of a small ski area, hundreds of Ponderosa pine trees remained in the infield, densest on the north end. The high jump pit was also surrounded by huge boulders. Four world records were achieved at the trials.

The location became a California Historical Landmark in 2014 with a roadside sign along Highway 50. At the time, this was only the fifth sports-related historical site in California.

The ski area, known as Nebelhorn and later Echo Summit, closed twenty years later in 1988. It is now Adventure Mountain, a snow play area for sledding and tubing.
