= Ivory Crockett =

American sprinter

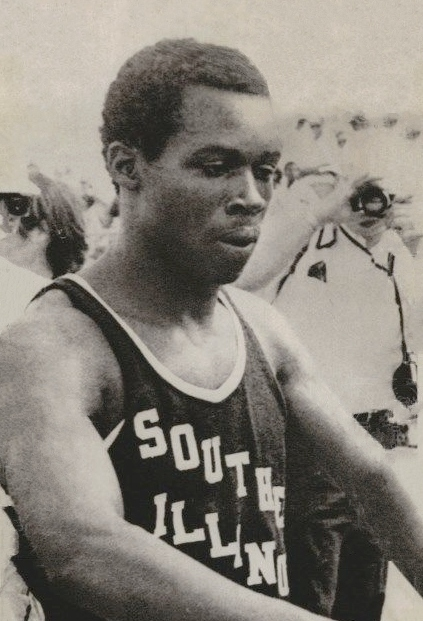
- Crockett in 1969

Personal information
- Born: August 24, 1948 (age 77) Halls, Tennessee, U.S.

Sport
- Sport: Athletics
- Event: Sprint

Achievements and titles
- Personal best(s): 100 yd – 9.0 (1974); 100 m – 10.1 (1971); 200 m – 20.2 (1972)

Ivory Crockett (born August 24, 1948) is a retired American sprinter who, for a time, was "the world's fastest man" when he broke the world record for the 100-yard dash in 1974.

== Career ==
Crockett was born in Halls, Tennessee, where his father was a sharecropper. His family moved to Missouri when Crockett was a young boy.

Crockett was a track star from his time at high school in Webster Groves in St. Louis County, Missouri. In 1968 as a senior he ran the second fastest time that year by a high-school student. He was recruited to Southern Illinois University in Carbondale, Illinois, where he competed successfully on their track team, including becoming twice USA champion in the 100 yards sprint, in 1969 and 1970.

In 1974, he ran the fastest 100-yard dash with manual timing of 9.0 seconds, a record he still holds. This was deemed at the time by the Los Angeles Times as "Immortality in 9 Seconds Flat", and he was quickly tagged with the title the world's fastest man by Track and Field News who put him on their June 1974 cover.

Crockett never ran in the Olympics for the USA having been eliminated at the semi-final stage of the 1972 USA Olympics trials and the quarter-finals of the 1976 trials.

After college, he moved back to Webster Groves where he had attended Brentwood and Webster Groves High School. His local community recognised his achievements by naming a park in his honour, 'Ivory Crockett Park'. As a gift to his local community, Crockett started in 2004 'The Ivory Crockett Run "4" Webster', a fun walk/run.

Some people questioned his winning of his national titles because rivals were missing, and demeaned the legitimacy of his world record. This rankled because he was married and had had to battle financial tough times to keep on running.

Crockett became an administrator and director of business development for the College of Nursing at Forest Park Hospital in St Louis, Missouri.

== World rankings ==
Crockett was voted to be ranked among the best in the US and the world in the 100 m sprint event in the period from 1969 to 1974, according to Track and Field News. He was also voted to be ranked 10th in the US and 4th in the world in the 200 m sprint in 1973.

100 meters
| Year | World rank | US rank |
|---|---|---|
| 1969 | 4th | 2nd |
| 1970 | 9th | 5th |
| 1971 | – | 9th |
| 1972 | – | 7th |
| 1973 | 10th | 3rd |
| 1974 | 6th | 3rd |
