= Ronnie Ray Smith =

American Athlete (1949-2013)

Ronnie Smith
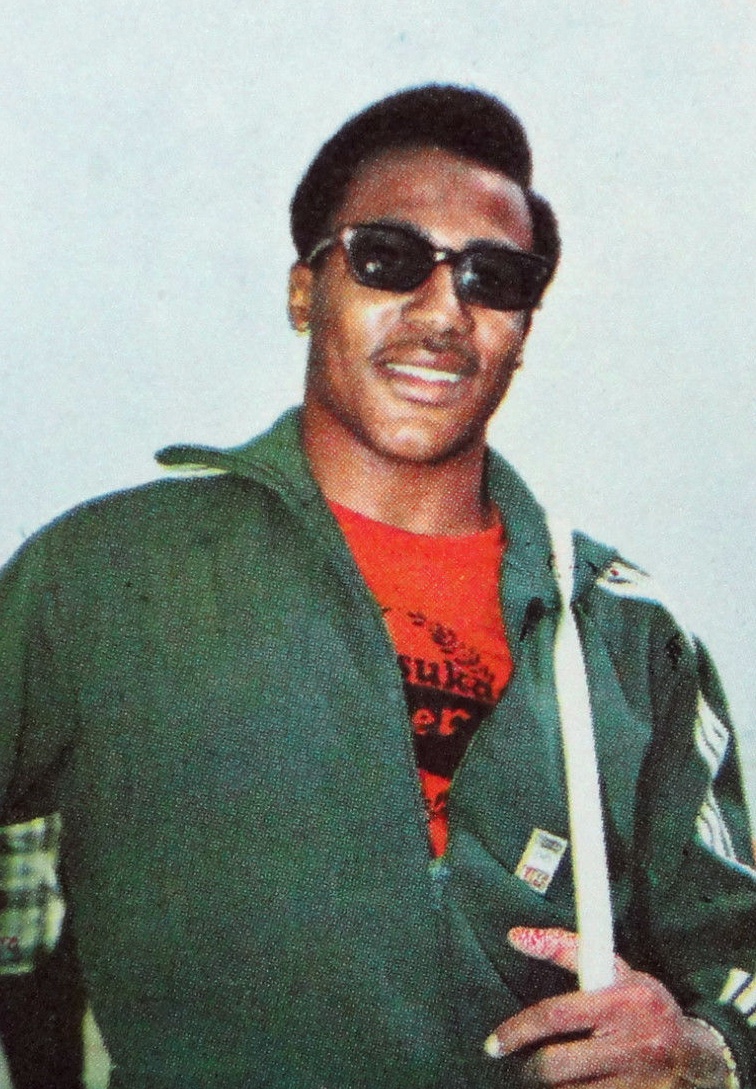

Personal information
- Born: Ronald Ray Smith; March 28, 1949 Los Angeles, California, United States
- Died: March 31, 2013 (aged 64) Los Angeles, California, United States
- Height: 1.73 m (5 ft 8 in)
- Weight: 73 kg (161 lb)

Sport
- Sport: Athletics
- Events: 100 m, 200 m
- Club: Southern California Striders, Anaheim

Achievements and titles
- Personal bests: 100 yd – 9.3 (1969); 100 m – 10.14 (9.9h) (1968); 200 m – 20.4 (1968)
Medal record
Representing the United States
Olympic Games
Gold medal – first place	1968 Mexico City	4 × 100 m relay

Ronald Ray Smith (March 28, 1949 – March 31, 2013) was an American athlete, winner of the gold medal in the 4 × 100 m relay at the 1968 Summer Olympics. He attended San Jose State College during the "Speed City" era, coached by Lloyd (Bud) Winter and graduating in sociology.

At the 1968 AAU Championships, Ronnie Ray Smith equaled the 100 m world record in the semifinal, repeating the same time of 9.9 which was run by Jim Hines in the same race and Charles Greene in the other semifinal of the same competition. That evening of June 20, 1968, at Hughes Stadium in Sacramento, California has been dubbed by track and field historians as the "Night of Speed." Since Smith was still 19 years old at the time, that mark also became the World Junior Record, which lasted for exactly 8 years.

At the Mexico Olympics, Smith ran the third leg in the American 4 × 100 m relay team that won the gold medal and set a new world record of 38.24 seconds.

Before arriving at San Jose State, Smith ran at Manual Arts High School in Los Angeles, finishing third in the 220 yard dash at the CIF California State Meet in 1966.

After retiring from competitions Smith worked at the Los Angeles Parks and Recreation Department. He was inducted into the San Jose State Sports Hall of Fame.

Smith died in a hospice facility in Los Angeles, California, on March 31, 2013. He was 64. His funeral was featured on the TLC reality TV show Best Funeral Ever. In honor and memory of his 1968 gold medal performance, his casket "ran" a 100 yd race and received a gold medal in a mock Olympic-style funeral.

Records
Unknown	100 metres world junior record holder June 20, 1968 – June 20, 1976	Succeeded by Harvey Glance
