= 100-yard dash =

Track and field sprint event

The 100-yard dash is a track and field sprint event of 100 yards (91.44 metres). It was part of the Commonwealth Games until 1970, and was included in the triathlon of the Olympics in 1904. It is not generally used in international events, replaced by the 100-metre sprint (109.36 yards). However, it is still occasionally run in the United States in certain competitions; in the NCAA championships it was last run in 1975. Walter Halben Butler (1852–1931) is credited with being the first to run the race in 10 seconds flat.

== All-time top 25 ==
Automatic timed results only

- + = en route to 100 m performance
- A = affected by altitude
- NWI = no wind information

=== Men ===
- Updated in August 2023.

Rank	Time	Wind (m/s)	Athlete	Nationality	Date	Place	Ref.
1	9.07+	–0.5	Asafa Powell	Jamaica	27 May 2010	Ostrava	
2	9.10+	–0.4	Justin Gatlin	United States	17 June 2014	Ostrava	
3	9.14+	–0.2	Usain Bolt	Jamaica	31 May 2011	Ostrava	
4	9.19+	–0.2	Steve Mullings	Jamaica	31 May 2011	Ostrava	
5	9.20+	+0.2	Dwain Chambers	Great Britain	22 Aug 1999	Seville	
6	9.21 A	+1.5	Charles Greene	United States	16 June 1967	Provo	
7	9.29+	–0.2	Kim Collins	Saint Kitts and Nevis	31 May 2011	Ostrava	
7	9.29+	–0.4	Mike Rodgers	United States	17 June 2014	Ostrava	
9	9.30+	–0.2	Daniel Bailey	Antigua and Barbuda	31 May 2011	Ostrava	
9	9.30	+0.9	Houston McTear	United States	9 May 1975	Winter Park	
9	9.30	+1.6	Linford Christie	Great Britain	8 July 1994	Edinburgh	
12	9.32 A	+1.5	Lennox Miller	Jamaica	16 June 1967	Provo	
13	9.33 A	0.0	Clifford Outlin	United States	6 June 1975	Provo	
13	9.33	+1.6	Johnny Jones	United States	19 March 1977	Austin	
13	9.33	+1.2	Jon Drummond	United States	30 April 1994	Philadelphia	
16	9.34+	–0.4	Isiah Young	United States	26 May 2015	Ostrava	
16	9.34	+1.9	Reggie Jones	United States	7 June 1974	Austin	
18	9.35	NWI	Bob Hayes	United States	22 June 1962	Walnut	
18	9.35	NWI	Bill Collins	United States	2 May 1974	Austin	
18	9.35 A	–1.1	Hasely Crawford	Trinidad and Tobago	6 June 1975	Provo	
21	9.36	+0.5	Frank Budd	United States	24 June 1961	New York City	
21	9.36	+1.2	Andre Cason	United States	30 April 1994	Philadelphia	
21	9.36	+1.6	Sam Jefferson	United States	8 July 1994	Edinburg	
21	9.36+	-0.2	Rohan Browning	Australia	11 March 2023	Sydney	
25	9.37	+1.9	Donald Quarrie	Jamaica	10 May 1975	Fresno	
25	9.37+	+0.7	Trell Kimmons	United States	27 May 2010	Ostrava	
25	9.37+	–0.2	Lerone Clarke	Jamaica	31 May 2011	Ostrava	

==== Notes ====
Below is a list of other times equal or superior to 9.37:

- Asafa Powell also ran 9.09+ (2010), 9.26+ (2015), 9.27+ (2013).
- Charles Greene also ran 9.23A (1967).
- Usain Bolt ran 9.23+ (2016), 9.29+ (2012).
- Kim Collins also ran 9.30+ (2013), 9.34+ (2014).
- Mike Rodgers also ran 9.37+ (2013).

=== Women ===
Rank	Time	Wind (m/s)	Athlete	Nationality	Date	Place	Ref.
1	9.91+	+1.1	Veronica Campbell-Brown	Jamaica	31 May 2011	Ostrava	
2	10.11+	+0.5	Zoe Hobbs	New Zealand	11 March 2023	Sydney	
3	10.15 i		Heike Drechsler	East Germany	1987		
4	10.21 i		Silke Möller	East Germany	1988		
4	10.21+	+1.5	Chandra Sturrup	Bahamas	27 May 2010	Ostrava	
4	10.21+	+1.1	Debbie Ferguson	Bahamas	31 May 2011	Ostrava	
7	10.22+	+1.1	Schillonie Calvert	Jamaica	31 May 2011	Ostrava	
8	10.25 i		Marita Koch	East Germany	1985		
9	10.28+	+1.5	Sheri-Ann Brooks	Jamaica	27 May 2010	Ostrava	
10	10.29 i		Marlies Göhr	East Germany	1980		
10	10.29 i		Marlies Göhr	East Germany	1983		
11	10.30+	+1.1	Ruddy Zang Milama	Gabon	31 May 2011	Ostrava	
12	10.34+	+0.5	Torrie Lewis	Australia	11 March 2023	Sydney	
13	10.38	NWI	Melinda Gainsford-Taylor	Australia	1995		
13	10.38+	+1.1	Barbara Pierre	United States	31 May 2011	Ostrava	
15	10.43 i		Bärbel Schölzel	East Germany	1984		
16	10.45+	+1.5	Yevgeniya Polyakova	Russia	27 May 2010	Ostrava	
17	10.46+	+1.1	LaShauntea Moore	United States	31 May 2011	Ostrava	
17	10.46+	+1.5	Mikele Barber	United States	27 May 2010	Ostrava	
19	10.47+	+0.5	Ella Connolly	Australia	11 March 2023	Sydney	
20	10.48 i		Renate Stecher	East Germany	1974		
20	10.48+	+0.5	Bree Masters	Australia	11 March 2023	Sydney	
22	10.49+	+1.1	Kateřina Čechová	Czech Republic	31 May 2011	Ostrava	
23	10.51 i		Kerstin Behrendt	East Germany	1989		
24	10.52+	+0.5	Kristie Edwards	Australia	11 March 2023	Sydney	
25	10.56+	+1.5	Gloria Asumnu	United States	27 May 2010	Ostrava	
25	10.56+	+0.5	Naa Anang	Australia	11 March 2023	Sydney	
25	10.56+	+0.5	Arisa Kimishima	Japan	11 March 2023	Sydney	

Note: The following athletes have had their performances annulled due to doping offense:

Time	Wind	Athlete	Nation	Date	Place	Ref.
10.15+	+1.5	Shelly-Ann Fraser-Pryce	Jamaica	27 May 2010	Ostrava	

==== Notes ====
Below is a list of other times equal or superior to 10.33:

- Veronica Campbell-Brown also ran 10.22+ (2011).
- Heike Drechsler also ran 10.24i (1986).
- Schillonie Calvert also ran 10.30+ (2011).
- Debbie Ferguson also ran 10.31+ (2011)
- Marita Koch also ran 10.33i (1979, 1981).

== Notable 100-yard dash runners ==
=== Men ===
Athlete	Date	Time	Remarks	Ref.
F. C. Saportas	1870	10.5	Official world record	
Horace H. Lee	1877	10.0	Equalled official world record	
W. C. Wilmer	1878	10.0	Equalled official world record	
Lon Myers	1880	10.0	Equalled official world record	
Arthur Wharton	1886	10.0	Equalled official world record	
J. Owen, Jr.	1890	9.8	Official world record	
Arthur Duffey	1902	9.6	Official world record (later expunged)	
R.P. Williams	1906	9.0	5 separate time pieces	
Dan Kelly	1906	9.6	Official world record	
Jack Donaldson	Johannesburg, 1910	9.375	World record	
Eric Liddell	1924	9.7	British record	
Denis Cussen	1928	9.8	Irish record	
Eddie Tolan	1929	9.5	Official world record	
Frank Wykoff	Chicago 7 June 1930	9.4	Official world record, without starting blocks	
Jesse Owens	1933	9.4	Equalled world record, set US high school record	
Mel Patton	1948	9.3	Official world record	
James Jackson	Alameda High School, Alameda, California, 1954	9.4	Equalled US high-school record	
Ken Irvine	1961	9.3	Equalled professional 100-yard world record	
Harry Jerome	1962	9.2	Record made Jerome the only athlete to own both the 100-yard and 100-metre world record simultaneously.	
Frank Budd	1962	9.2	Official world record	
Bob Hayes	1962	9.35		
Charles Greene	1967	9.21		
Bob Hayes	1964	9.1	Hand-timed	
John Carlos	1969	9.1	Hand-timed, equalled Hayes's world record	
Houston McTear	1975 Florida HS State Prelims, Winter Park, FL	9.0	Unofficial and hand-timed. In 1975 registered a time of 9.30 seconds.	
Pharnell Raines	1971, Fort Myers, Florida	9.2	High school record, hand-timed	
Ivory Crockett	1974	9.0	Hand-timed	
Asafa Powell	27 May 2010	9.07+ (−0.5 m/s)	Official World Best, en route to 100 m	

=== Women ===
Athlete	Date	Time	Remarks	Ref.
Mae Faggs	1954	10.8		
Heather Young	20 July 1958	10.73 (+0.3 m/s)	Cardiff, official hand time 10.6	
Wilma Rudolph	1961	10.8		
Dorothy Hyman	10 July 1962	10.6 (+1.3 m/s)		
Mary Rand	4 July 1964	10.6 (+0.4 m/s)		
Daphne Arden	4 July 1964	10.6 (+1.2 m/s)		
Jill Hall	3 July 1965	10.77 (+1.8 m/s)	London	
Wyomia Tyus	1965	10.5		
Val Peat	10 August 1968	10.6 (±0.0 m/s)	Huddersfield	
Maureen Tranter	7 September 1968	10.6 (+1.8 m/s)	Birmingham	
Barbara Ferrell	1969	10.7		
Chi Cheng	13 June 1970	10.0	Portland, Oregon	
Iris Davis	1973	10.3w		
Heather Hunte	17 February 1978	10.67 i	Senftenberg	
Veronica Campbell-Brown	31 May 2011	9.91+ (+1.1 m/s)	Official World Best, en route to 100 m	
