= Charles Greene (sprinter) =

American sprinter (1945–2022)

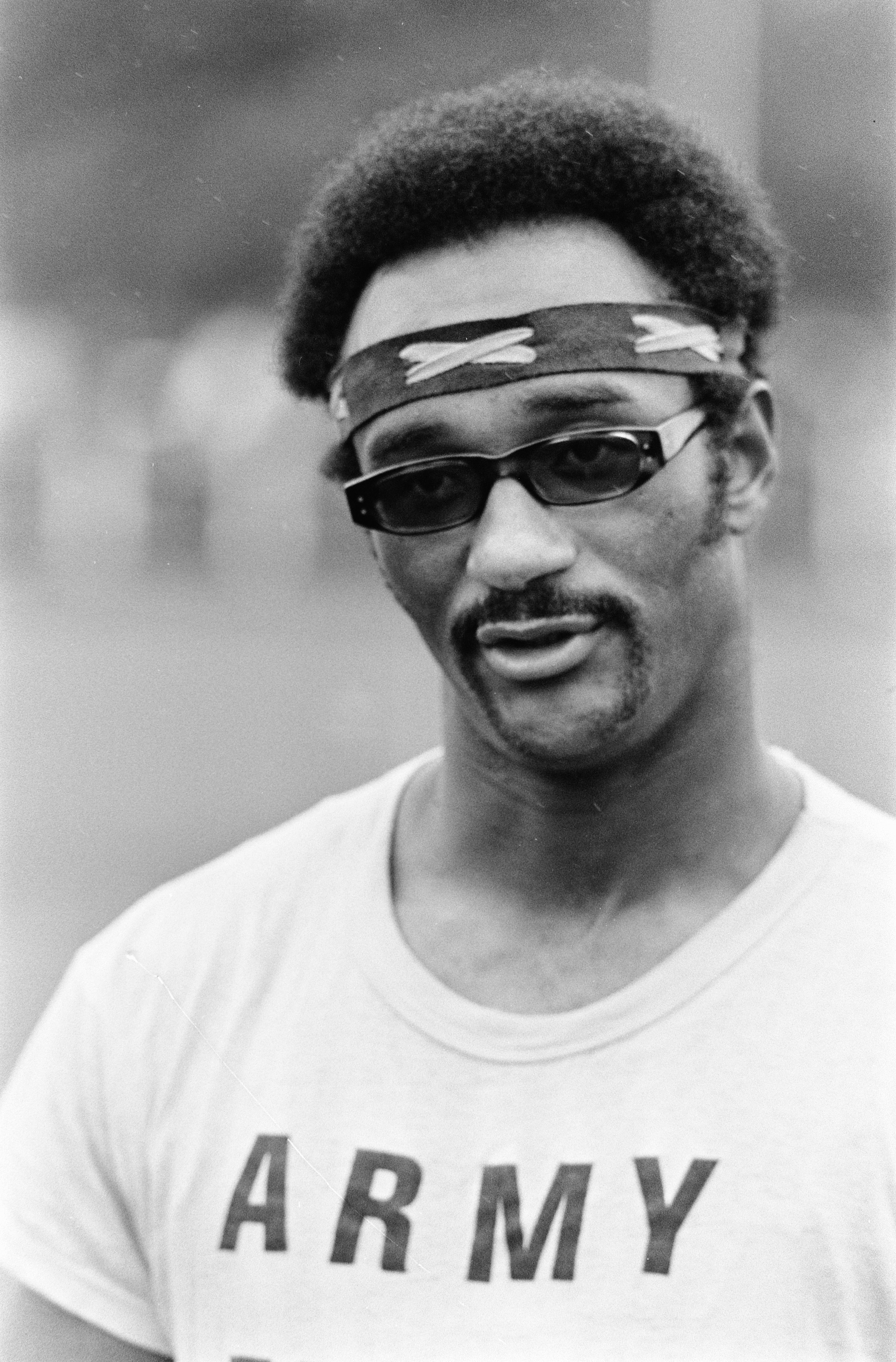
- Greene in 1970

Personal information
- Born: March 21, 1944 Pine Bluff, Arkansas, U.S.
- Died: March 14, 2022 (aged 76) Lincoln, Nebraska, U.S.
- Height: 1.73 m (5 ft 8 in)
- Weight: 69 kg (152 lb)

Sport
- Sport: Sprint
- Club: Cornhusker Track Club
Medal record
Representing the United States
Olympic Games
Gold medal – first place	1968 Mexico City	4 × 100 m relay
Bronze medal – third place	1968 Mexico City	100 m

Charles Edward "Charlie" Greene (March 21, 1945 – March 14, 2022) was an American track and field sprinter and winner of the gold medal in the 4 × 100 metres relay at the 1968 Summer Olympics.

Born in Pine Bluff, Arkansas, Greene was considered a certain candidate for the 1964 Olympic team, but he suffered a muscle pull which held him to a sixth-place finish at the Olympic Trials.

Greene won the 100-yard dash for O'Dea High School in Seattle in 1962 and 1963 and also the 220-yard dash in 1963. Greene won the Amateur Athletic Union (AAU) championships in the 100-yard dash in 1966 and in the 100-meter dash in 1968. At the 1968 AAU Championships, Greene tied the 100 m world record twice. First in the heats, he equaled the world record of 10.0 seconds. In the second semifinal, he achieved a time of 9.9 seconds, the same time which had been run by Jim Hines and Ronnie Ray Smith in the previous race. The evening when the three men equaled the world record (and several others were very close), June 20, 1968, at Hughes Stadium in Sacramento, California has been dubbed by track and field historians as the "Night of Speed". As a University of Nebraska student, Greene won the National Collegiate Athletic Association (NCAA) championships in the 100-yard dash from 1965 to 1967 and tied the world record at 9.1 seconds.

At the 1968 Olympics in Mexico, Greene felt pain in his left hamstring late in the race and was third in the 100-meter dash. He was the fastest man in the trials and semifinals, but before the final race he was injured although started anyway with a bandaged leg. Despite the injury, he also led off the American 4 × 100 metres relay team which won the gold medal and set a new world record of 38.24 seconds.

Following his athletic career, Greene became a United States Army officer, serving as the sprint coach at West Point and head coach of the All-Army team. After retiring from the Army with the rank of Major, he became a director for Special Olympics International.

In 2007, Charles Greene became the sprints coach at Lincoln Northeast High School in Lincoln, Nebraska. He coached multiple state qualifiers in his first year along with the state's third-place 4 × 100 metres relay team of Logan Reising, Brian May, Tory Berks, and AJ Robinson.

Greene, who spent most of his childhood in Seattle, Washington, was slowed down later in life due to a number of medical complications and surgeries. He died in Lincoln, Nebraska on March 14, 2022, at the age of 76.
