= Jim Hines =

American athletics sprinter (1946–2023)

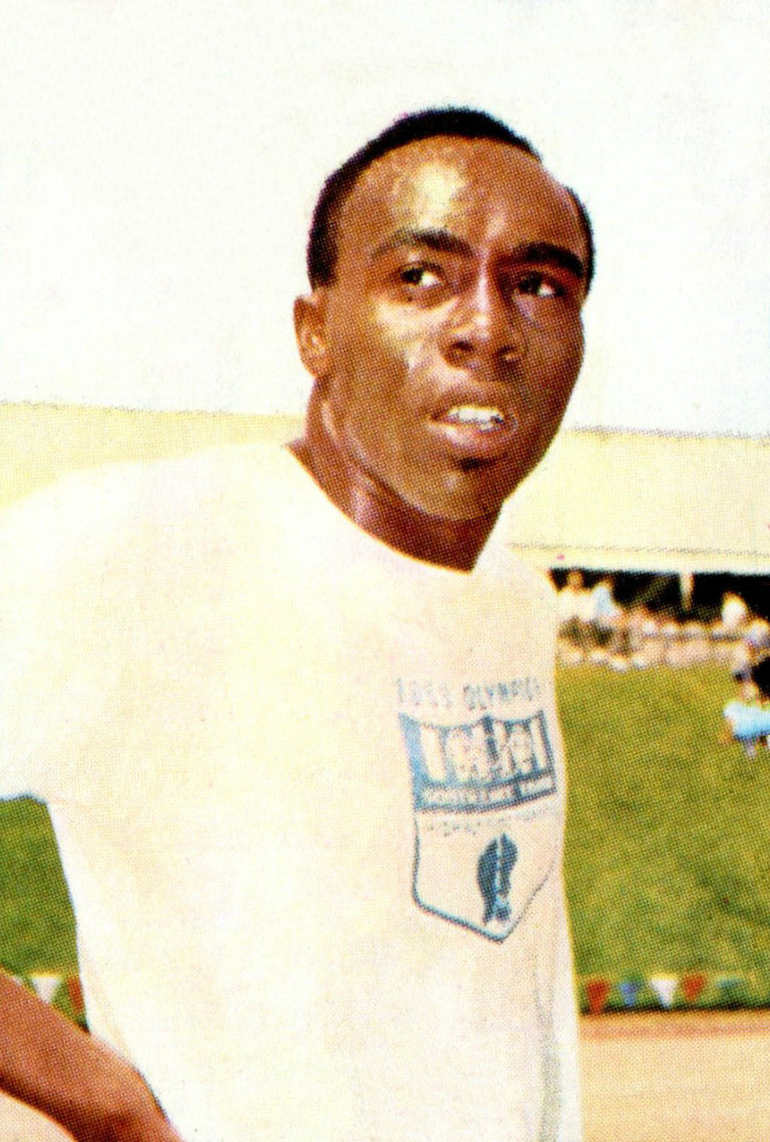
- Hines in 1968

Personal information
- Full name: James Ray Hines
- Born: September 10, 1946 Dumas, Arkansas, U.S.
- Died: June 3, 2023 (aged 76) Hayward, California, U.S.
- Football career

No. 99, 81
- Position: Wide receiver

Personal information
- Listed height: 6 ft 0 in (1.83 m)
- Listed weight: 175 lb (79 kg)

Career information
- High school: McClymonds (Oakland, California)
- College: Texas Southern
- NFL draft: 1968: 6th round, 146th overall pick

Career history
- Miami Dolphins (1968–1969); Kansas City Chiefs (1970)

Career NFL statistics
- Receptions: 2
- Receiving yards: 23
- Rushing yards: 7
- Kick return yards: 22
- Stats at Pro Football Reference

Sport
- Country: United States
- Sport: Track and field
- Event: Sprints
- College team: Texas Southern Tigers

Achievements and titles
- Personal bests: 100 m: 9.95 A (Mexico City, 1968); 200 m: 20.59 (Bakersfield, 1967)
Medal record
Men's athletics
Representing the United States
Olympic Games
Gold medal – first place	1968 Mexico City	100 m
Gold medal – first place	1968 Mexico City	4 × 100 m relay

James Ray Hines (September 10, 1946 – June 3, 2023) was an American track and field athlete and National Football League (NFL) player, who held the 100-meter world record for 15 years. In 1968, he became the first man to officially break the 10-second barrier in the 100 meters, and won individual and relay gold at the Mexico City Olympics.

== Track career ==
Born in Dumas, Arkansas, Hines was raised in Oakland, California, and graduated from McClymonds High School in 1964. He was a baseball player in his younger years until he was spotted by track coach Jim Coleman as a running talent, and Hines became a sprinter. At the 1968 U.S. national championships in Sacramento, California, Hines became the first man to break the ten second barrier in the 100-metre race, setting 9.9 (manual timing), with an electronic time of 10.03 – two other athletes, Ronnie Ray Smith behind him (electronic time 10.13) and Charles Greene on the other semi-final (electronic time 10.09) having the same official clocking. That evening of June 20, 1968, at Hughes Stadium has been dubbed by track and field historians as the "Night of Speed". Hines attended Texas Southern University in Houston, Texas. He was a member of the Texas Southern University Tigers track team.

A few months later, at the 1968 Summer Olympics, Hines – a black athlete – found himself in a tense situation, with racial riots going on in his home country and a threat of a boycott by the black athletes of the U.S. team, who were disturbed by the controversial idea of admitting apartheid South Africa to the Games and revelations linking the head of the International Olympic Committee, Avery Brundage, to a racist and antisemitic country club. Hines reached the 100 m final, and won it with the time 9.89 appearing on the screen, later corrected to 9.95. The 9.89 was taken from a light beam across the finish line, while the official photographic process used Polaroid film and took a couple of minutes to process and read. There was some controversy over how his (slower appearing) automatic time of 9.95 should compare to the hand timed 9.9 world record (Hines was again recorded at 9.9 in his 9.95 race). Automatic times start instantly with the sound of the gun, while hand times include human reaction time to start the watch. It took until 1977 before fully automatic timing was required of world records. As the fastest electronic time to that point, Hines' mark was recognized exclusively as a new world record. The race was also significant for being the third all-black podium in Olympic history. Hines helped break another world record, when he and his teammates sprinted to the 4 × 100 m relay gold at the same Games.

== Professional football career ==
Hines was drafted 146th overall by the Miami Dolphins of the NFL in the sixth round of the 1968 NFL/AFL draft. Hines spent the 1968 season on the Dolphins' practice squad. He was given the nickname "Oops". He appeared in ten games with Miami in 1969, accumulating a total of 52 all-purpose yards. Hines' final professional game was his first and only game with the Kansas City Chiefs in 1970. Hines was ranked as the 10th-worst NFL player of all time by Deadspin writer Jeff Pearlman.

In 1977, Hines played football for the Austin Texans of the semi-pro American Football Association.

== Later life ==
For years Hines worked with inner-city youth in Houston, as well as on oil rigs outside the city.

Hines's world record remained unsurpassed until Calvin Smith ran a time of 9.93 in 1983.

Hines competed in the 100 at a 1984 Masters Track and Field Competition at UCLA.

Hines was inducted into the Texas Sports Hall of Fame, class of 1994. Hines was also inducted into the Texas Track and Field coaches Hall of Fame, class of 2016.

Hines died in Hayward, California, on June 3, 2023, at the age of 76.

Records
Preceded by (United States) Bob Hayes (United States) Charles Greene	Men's 100 meters world record holders June 20, 1968 – October 13, 1968; October 14, 1968 – July 3, 1983	Succeeded by (United States) Charles Greene (United States) Calvin Smith
