= Fully automatic time =

Form of race timing

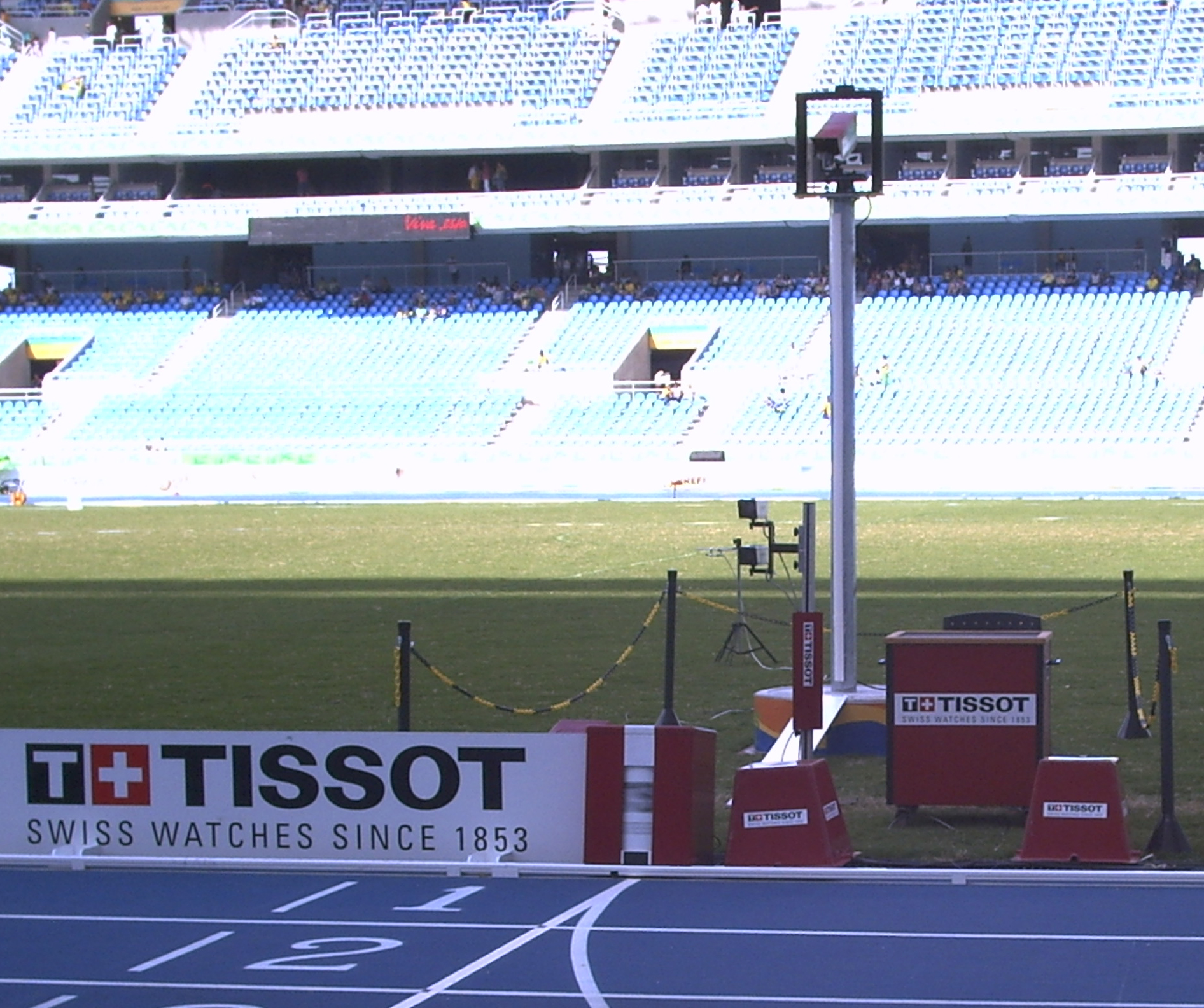
A fully automatic timing camera system, on the finish line of the 2007 Pan American Games at João Havelange Olympic Stadium

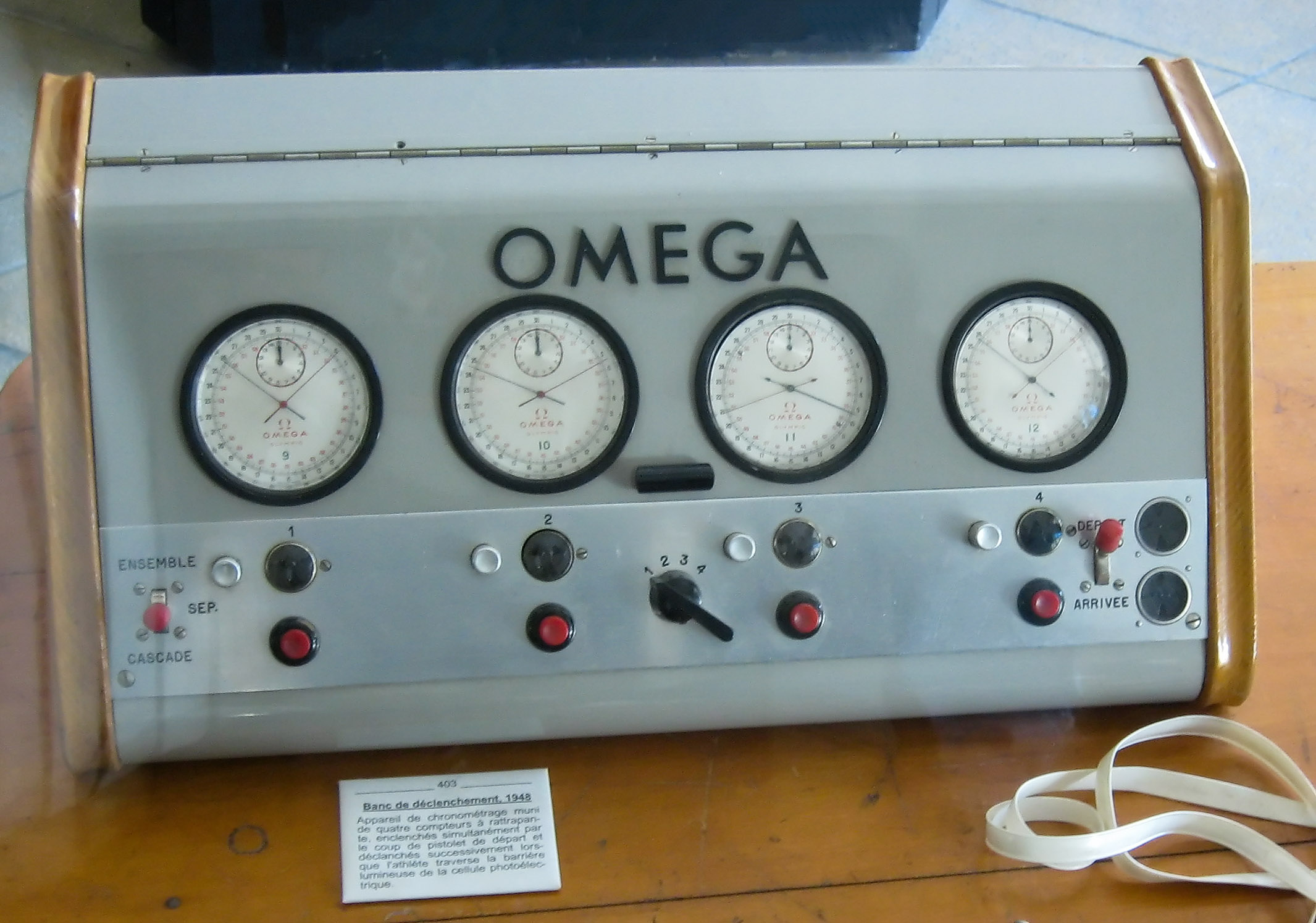
An Omega FAT device of 1948, containing four chronometers started by a starting gun and stopped by a photocell

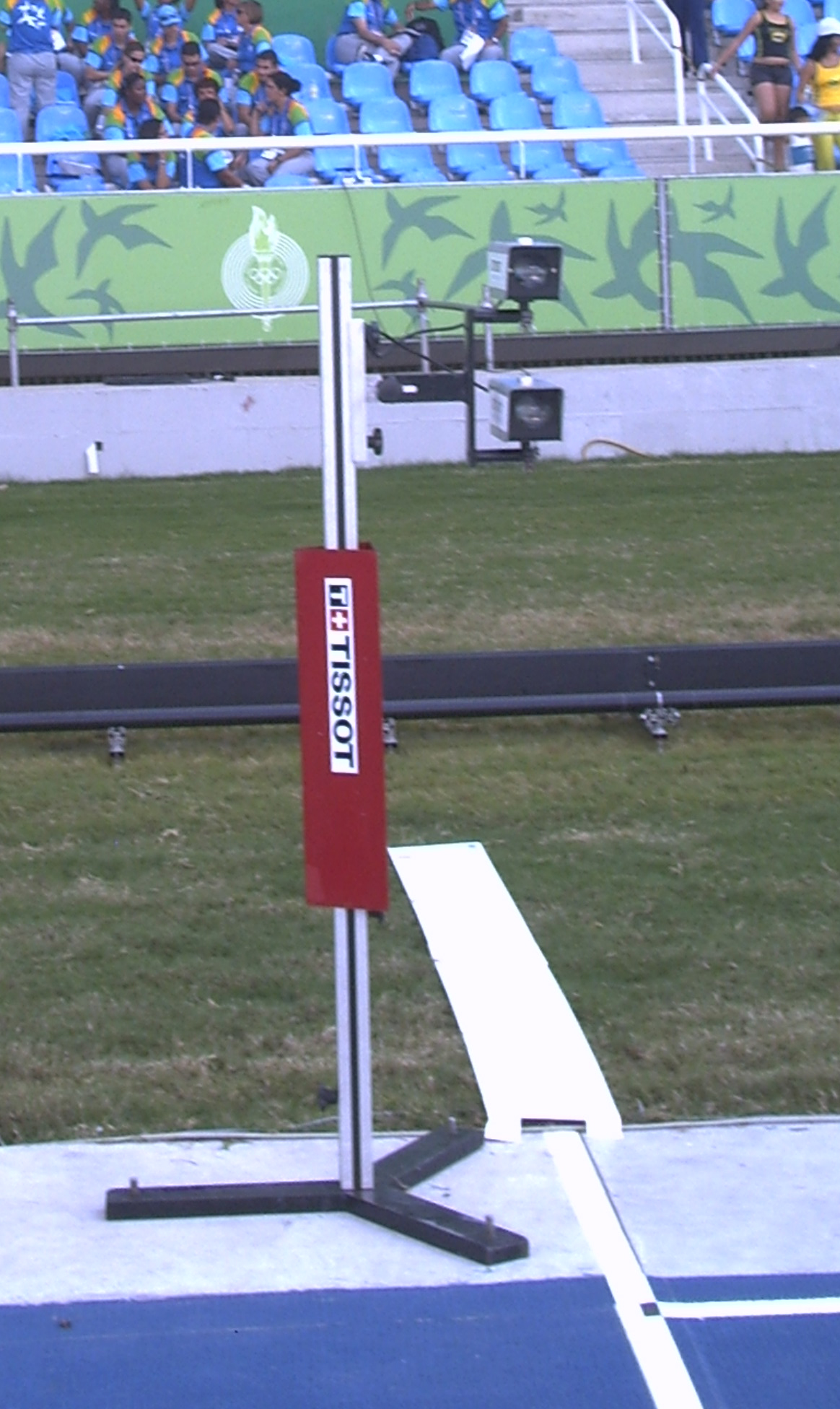
Light beam timing system (the two lenses extended to the right of the stand)

Fully automatic timing (abbreviated FAT) is a form of race timing in which the clock is automatically activated by the starting device, and the finish time is either automatically recorded, or timed by analysis of a photo finish. The system is commonly used in track and field as well as athletic performance testing, horse racing, dog racing, bicycle racing, rowing and auto racing. In these fields a photo finish is used. It is also used in competitive swimming, for which the swimmers themselves record a finish time by touching a touchpad at the end of a race. In order to verify the equipment, or in case of failure, a backup system (typically manual) is usually used in addition to FAT.

== Technology ==
In races started by a starting pistol, a sensor is typically attached to the gun which sends an electronic signal to the timing system when fired. An alternative starting light or sound which is electronically triggered, such as a horn, is typically also wired to the timing system. In sports that involve a finish line that is crossed (rather than a touch finish, as in swimming), the current finishing system is a photo finish which is then analysed by judges.

=== Line-scan cameras ===
The current photo-finish system used in Olympic competition, as well as other top-level events uses a digital line-scan camera aimed straight along the finish line. TimeTronics, FinishLynx, and Omega are examples of commercial timing systems commonly used in athletic competitions. These cameras have an image field only a few pixels wide, with a single frame forming a narrow image only of the finish line, and anything which is crossing it. During a race, the camera takes images at an extremely high frame rate (the exact rate depends on the system, but can be in the thousands of lines per second). Computer software then arranges these frames horizontally to form a panoramic image which effectively displays a graph of the finish line (and anything crossing it) as time passes, with time denoted on the horizontal axis.

Before the advent of digital photography (and still available as an alternative), a similar film-based system was used, consisting of a slit which a strip of film is advanced past at a constant rate to produce a similar panoramic image to the digital system. A flashing LED embedded the time calibration to the film.

=== Full-frame cameras ===
Recently, there have been significant advances in full-frame video timing which utilizes a full sensor array rather than a single line. This has followed from the advent of low-cost machine vision technologies which has made possible systems that surpass 1/100 second time resolution. Previously, the NTSC television standard limited most VHS and SVHS, and digital frame rates to 59.94 frames per second (limiting the timing resolution to .016 seconds). Many modern systems, such as those manufactured by FlashTiming, are capable of frame rates of 120 frames per second at higher spatial resolution and in a purely digital regime. The addition of computer based analysis tools has greatly simplified and made efficient the process of timing races, as well as automated some portions of timing labor such with features such as motion detection and bookmarking of finish times. Owing to these developments and the lower cost compared with line-scan systems, video timing has seen some limited level of adoption at a few high-school and collegiate events. The inability of these systems to perform what is known as a "zero control test" means that they do not comply with the requirements of the IAAF or other national governing bodies to be classified as fully automatic timing (FAT).

=== Break-beam timing systems ===
There are also similar timing systems that use the process of breaking a beam of light. Such systems are frequently used when athletes are tested individually. The nature of this technology does not recognize who is breaking the beam, but instead when the beam was broken (allowing it to be used in many applications outside of athletics). These systems provide instant results which can be very beneficial when there is a large group of athletes (such as a combine) or if coaches are wanting to quickly time their athletes. This type of FAT technology is used widely in the world of sports performance and movement research and can be much more affordable and easy to use when compared to the camera based systems. Break-beam timing systems have manufacturers worldwide including: Dashr (US), Brower (US), Zybek (US), Fusion Sport (Australia), BeamTrainer (Slovenia), and Microgate (Italy).

== Use in athletics ==
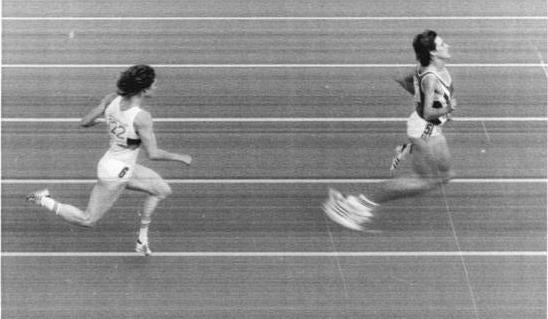
An example of a photographic automatic timed race: Sabine Busch, right, wins with 53.24s and Cornelia Ullrich comes second with 53.58s.

Some Pre-Race Funk, The Trick for an Olympic Double | On the Line
- Video on YouTube

According to the IAAF, any record in athletics (world, Olympic, or national) or qualifying time for Olympic Games or World Championships set in a sprint event must be timed by a FAT system to be valid.

Hand times, i.e. those with humans operating the stopping and/or starting mechanisms, are highly prone to error. By rule, they are only accurate to a tenth (.1) of a second, so all 100ths of a second beyond zero must be rounded to the next highest tenth.

Many track and field statisticians use a conversion factor estimate of 0.24 seconds added to any hand-timed mark in the 100 m or 200 m event, and 0.14 seconds to any hand-timed mark in the 400 m or longer event: these conversion factors are only applicable for comparing marks from a variety of sources, and are not acceptable for record purposes.

In the case of comparing an adjusted manual time to FAT timing with an original FAT time being equivalent, the FAT time will be considered more accurate, and thus the athlete will be given the higher seed, or comparison ranking. This method of converting times dates back to when FAT systems were much less common. Hand times are increasingly less acceptable, even at low level meets, and are no longer acceptable at the upper level of the sport.

Fully automatic timing did not become mandatory for world records until 1 January 1977.

=== History ===
The first known time with an auto timing device in the Olympic Games was in the steeplechase in 1928, won by Toivo Loukola in 9:21.60 (9:21 4/5 official hand time). The device used was the Löbner camera-timer.

In 1932 three systems were used: official hand timing, hand started photo-finish times, and the Gustavus Town Kirby timing device, which was designed by Kirby to determine the correct order of finish in horse races. The official report for 1932 Olympics states: "In addition to hand timing, two auxiliary electrical timing devices were used. Both were started by an attachment to the starters gun. One was stopped by hand at the time the runners hit the tape. The other was provided with a motion picture camera which photographed the runner at the tape and the dial of the time indicator simultaneously." Kirby's system was also used at the 1932 US. Olympic Trials, where Ralph Metcalfe's winning time of 10.62 in the 100 meters is considered possibly the first automatically timed world record.

FAT was also used in 1936, but very few times have been found. In 1948, Bulova began developing the Phototimer, a unique combination of photo-finish camera and precision electronic timing instrument. The Phototimer was the first automatic timing device to be used in competitive sports.

It was used extensively in North America, including at the 1948 US Olympic trials. The Bulova device was activated by the sound of the starting gun firing, rather than by a direct connection, which means that the times were around 0.02 seconds faster than reality. The 1948 Olympics, however, continued to use Omega timing with a device called the 'Magic Eye', developed by British Race Finish Recording Co. Ltd. The automatic times produced in the 1948 Olympics have never been released, but examination of the photos at the finish means that margins have been calculated to 1/100 second accuracy.

In 1952 the Omega Time Recorder was the first to use a quartz clock and print out results, earning the company a prestigious Cross of Merit from the Olympic Committee. Clocks were added to slit cameras for automatic time-stamping, accurate to the 100th of a second. Despite these improvements, the overall system was similar to that used in London in 1948 (the Racend Omega Timer). The average difference between the FAT and manual times for the men's 100 meters was 0.24 seconds, although this ranged from 0.05 seconds to 0.45 seconds; for example, the average difference for the six runners in the men's 100 meter final was 0.41 seconds; while the average difference in the women's 100 meters was also 0.24, but only 0.22 in the final. In the men's 200 meters, the average difference was 0.21 seconds, and in the men's 400 meters the average difference was 0.16 seconds.

In 1956 the average difference between the FAT and manual times for the men's 100 meters was 0.19 seconds, ranging from -0.05 to 0.34 seconds. In the men's 200 meters, the average difference was 0.16 seconds, and in the men's 400 meters the average difference was 0.11 seconds.

In 1960 the average difference between the FAT and manual times for the men's 100 meters was 0.15 seconds, ranging from -0.05 to 0.26 seconds. In the men's 200 meters, the average difference was 0.13 seconds, and in the men's 400 meters the average difference was 0.14 seconds.

In 1964, although manual timing was also used at the Olympics, the official times were measured with a FAT system but were given the appearance of hand times. For example, Bob Hayes won the 100 meters in a FAT time of 10.06 seconds, which was converted to an official time of 10.0 seconds: the FAT systems in 1964 and 1968 had a built-in 0.05 second delay, meaning Hayes' FAT time was measured as 10.01 seconds, which was rounded to 10.0 seconds for official purposes (despite the fact that officials with stopwatches had timed Hayes at 9.9 seconds). The currently understood time of 10.06 has been determined by adding the 0.05 seconds delay back in.

The same adjustment has been made to the 1968 Olympics FAT times; Jim Hines' winning time for the 100 meters was measured as 9.89 seconds, which was subsequently adjusted to 9.95 seconds.

In 1972, having provided the official timing equipment since 1932, Omega lost the right to be the official timer for the Olympics to Longines. Omega returned for the 1976 Olympics. This was the first Olympics where official results were given to the nearest 1/100 seconds.

Later iterations of photo finish systems began using film to record and display times, including AccuTrack that used slit technology to record images over time at the finish line to Polaroid Instant Film. Accutrack was the most popular photo-finish camera in the United States in the late 1980s and into the early 1990s, but there were some limitations to the film based cameras (the film was advanced on a carriage that would sometimes jam, the width of film limited the amount of data—and thus times that could be captured, etc.) and this led to occasional failures during use.
