= 60 metres at the Olympics =

60 metres at the Olympic Games
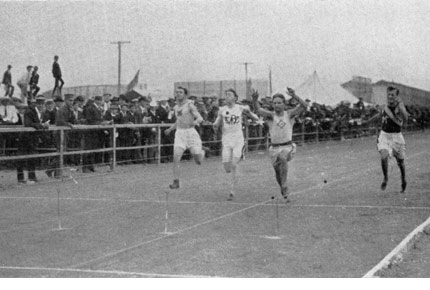
- The finish of the 60 metres final in 1904

Overview
- Sport: Athletics
- Gender: Men
- Years held: Men: 1900–1904

Olympic record
- Men: 7.0 sec Alvin Kraenzlein; Clyde Blair; Bill Hogenson; Archie Hahn

The 60 metres at the Summer Olympics was contested at the multi-sport event in 1900 and 1904. Part of the Olympic athletics programme, it is the shortest sprinting event to have featured at the Olympics. The shortest sprinting event on the current programme is the 100 metres. Only men competed in the two years that the event was held.

The United States dominated the event in its short history, winning five of the six medals given out. None of the medallists were specialists in the event and all of them won Olympic medals in different events in their careers. Alvin Kraenzlein's 1900 victory formed part of a haul of four gold medals at that Olympics, as he also won two hurdling titles and the long jump. Archie Hahn became the only man to have won three sprint titles in one Olympics in 1904, taking the short sprint titles from 60 metres up to 200 metres.

The fastest hand-timed performance for this event at the Olympics was seven seconds. This was twice achieved by Kraenzlein in 1900, was matched by fellow Americans Clyde Blair and Bill Hogenson in the 1904 first round, and equalled for a final time by Hahn in the 1904 final.

At the 1904 Summer Olympics a 60-yard dash handicap race was held and an American, C. Hastedt, was the winner. This contest is no longer considered part of the official Olympic canon of events.

After the event's removal from the Olympic programme, the 60 metres never featured at any other major outdoor international championship and it is now a common event in indoor track and field competitions.

== Medal summary ==
| Games | Gold | Silver | Bronze |
|---|---|---|---|
| 1900 Paris | Alvin Kraenzlein (USA) | Walter Tewksbury (USA) | Stan Rowley (AUS) |
| 1904 St. Louis | Archie Hahn (USA) | William Hogenson (USA) | Fay Moulton (USA) |

=== Medals by country ===
| Rank | Nation | Gold | Silver | Bronze | Total |
|---|---|---|---|---|---|
| 1 | United States | 2 | 2 | 1 | 5 |
| 2 | Australia | 0 | 0 | 1 | 1 |
