= 200 metres at the Olympics =

200 metres at the Olympic Games
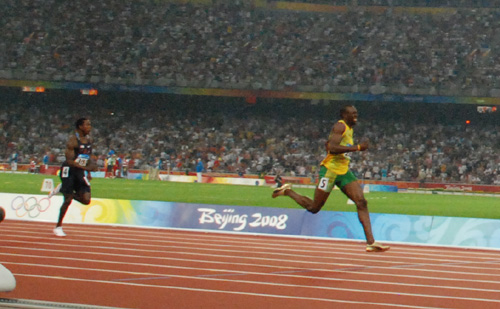
- The 2008 Olympic men's 200 m final

Overview
- Sport: Athletics
- Gender: Men and women
- Years held: Men: 1900–2024; Women: 1948–2024

Olympic record
- Men: Usain Bolt (JAM) 19.30 (2008)
- Women: Florence Griffith Joyner (USA) 21.34 (1988)

Reigning champion
- Men: Letsile Tebogo (BOT)
- Women: Gabby Thomas (USA)

The 200 metres at the Summer Olympics has been contested since the second edition of the multi-sport event. The men's 200 m has been present on the Olympic athletics programme since 1900 and the women's 200 m has been held continuously since its introduction at the 1948 Games. It is the most prestigious 200 m race at elite level. The competition format typically has three or four qualifying rounds leading to a final race between eight athletes.

The Olympic records for the distance are 19.30 seconds for men, set by Usain Bolt in 2008, and 21.34 seconds set by Florence Griffith Joyner in 1988. The men's world record was set at the Olympics in 1956, 1960 (twice), 1968, 1996 and 2008. The women's world record has similarly been linked to the competition, with records coming at the Olympic Games in 1952 (twice), 1956, 1968, 1972 and 1988 (twice). Griffith-Joyner's 1988 Olympic mark remains the world record for the distance, while Bolt's Olympic record is the third fastest of all-time.

Only three athletes have won the title more than once. Bärbel Wöckel of East Germany became the first to defend the title in 1980 and Veronica Campbell-Brown repeated that feat in 2008. Usain Bolt was the first person to win two Olympic 200 m gold medals at the 2012 Summer Olympics, and at the 2016 Summer Olympics he defended his title to win his third Olympic 200 m gold medal. Merlene Ottey is the most decorated athlete, having won four medals in the event (though none of them gold). Allyson Felix has won three medals, as has Poland's Irena Szewińska. Reflecting how sprint athletes often compete over various distances, many of the medalists in the Olympic 200 metres have had success in the Olympic 100 metres and 4×100 metres relay as well.

The United States has had the most success in the event, having 24 gold medals and 61 medals in total. American men have completed a medal sweep on six occasions. Jamaica is the next most successful, with five gold among their seventeen medals, and became the second nation to sweep the men's medals in 2012. No nation has swept the women's medals; the United States is the only nation to have won both gold and silver in the same year (in 1984).

The 1968 medal podium ceremony for the men's 200 metres witnessed a prominent political protest in the form of a Black Power salute by the African-American medalists Tommie Smith and John Carlos. The third medalist, Peter Norman of Australia, wore a badge for the Olympic Project for Human Rights in solidarity.

== Medal summary ==
=== Men ===
Games	Gold	Silver	Bronze
1900 Paris	Walter Tewksbury; United States	Norman Pritchard; India	Stan Rowley; Australia
1904 St. Louis	Archie Hahn; United States	Nate Cartmell; United States	William Hogenson; United States
1908 London	Robert Kerr; Canada	Robert Cloughen; United States	Nate Cartmell; United States
1912 Stockholm	Ralph Craig; United States	Donald Lippincott; United States	Willie Applegarth; Great Britain
1920 Antwerp	Allen Woodring; United States	Charley Paddock; United States	Harry Edward; Great Britain
1924 Paris	Jackson Scholz; United States	Charley Paddock; United States	Eric Liddell; Great Britain
1928 Amsterdam	Percy Williams; Canada	Walter Rangeley; Great Britain	Helmut Körnig; Germany
1932 Los Angeles	Eddie Tolan; United States	George Simpson; United States	Ralph Metcalfe; United States
1936 Berlin	Jesse Owens; United States	Mack Robinson; United States	Tinus Osendarp; Netherlands
1948 London	Mel Patton; United States	Barney Ewell; United States	Lloyd LaBeach; Panama
1952 Helsinki	Andy Stanfield; United States	Thane Baker; United States	James Gathers; United States
1956 Melbourne	Bobby Morrow; United States	Andy Stanfield; United States	Thane Baker; United States
1960 Rome	Livio Berruti; Italy	Lester Carney; United States	Abdoulaye Seye; France
1964 Tokyo	Henry Carr; United States	Paul Drayton; United States	Edwin Roberts; Trinidad and Tobago
1968 Mexico City	Tommie Smith; United States	Peter Norman; Australia	John Carlos; United States
1972 Munich	Valeriy Borzov; Soviet Union	Larry Black; United States	Pietro Mennea; Italy
1976 Montreal	Don Quarrie; Jamaica	Millard Hampton; United States	Dwayne Evans; United States
1980 Moscow	Pietro Mennea; Italy	Allan Wells; Great Britain	Don Quarrie; Jamaica
1984 Los Angeles	Carl Lewis; United States	Kirk Baptiste; United States	Thomas Jefferson; United States
1988 Seoul	Joe DeLoach; United States	Carl Lewis; United States	Robson da Silva; Brazil
1992 Barcelona	Michael Marsh; United States	Frankie Fredericks; Namibia	Michael Bates; United States
1996 Atlanta	Michael Johnson; United States	Frankie Fredericks; Namibia	Ato Boldon; Trinidad and Tobago
2000 Sydney	Konstantinos Kenteris; Greece	Darren Campbell; Great Britain	Ato Boldon; Trinidad and Tobago
2004 Athens	Shawn Crawford; United States	Bernard Williams; United States	Justin Gatlin; United States
2008 Beijing	Usain Bolt; Jamaica	Shawn Crawford; United States	Walter Dix; United States
2012 London	Usain Bolt; Jamaica	Yohan Blake; Jamaica	Warren Weir; Jamaica
2016 Rio de Janeiro	Usain Bolt; Jamaica	Andre De Grasse; Canada	Christophe Lemaitre; France
2020 Tokyo	Andre De Grasse; Canada	Kenny Bednarek; United States	Noah Lyles; United States
2024 Paris	Letsile Tebogo; Botswana	Kenny Bednarek; United States	Noah Lyles; United States

A YouTube video showcasing all men's 200 metres' Olympic winners can be found here.

==== Multiple medalists ====
Rank	Athlete	Nation	Olympics	Gold	Silver	Bronze	Total
1	Usain Bolt	Jamaica	2008–2016	3	0	0	3
2	Andy Stanfield	United States	1952–1956	1	1	0	2
2	Carl Lewis	United States	1984–1988	1	1	0	2
2	Andre De Grasse	Canada	2016–2020	1	1	0	2
2	Shawn Crawford	United States	2004–2008	1	1	0	2
6	Pietro Mennea	Italy	1972, 1980	1	0	1	2
6	Don Quarrie	Jamaica	1976–1980	1	0	1	2
8	Charlie Paddock	United States	1920–1924	0	2	0	2
8	Frankie Fredericks	Namibia	1992–1996	0	2	0	2
8	Kenny Bednarek	United States	2020–2024	0	2	0	2
11	Nate Cartmell	United States	1904–1908	0	1	1	2
11	Thane Baker	United States	1952–1956	0	1	1	2
13	Ato Boldon	Trinidad and Tobago	1996–2000	0	0	2	2
13	Noah Lyles	United States	2020–2024	0	0	2	2

==== Medals by country ====
Rank	Nation	Gold	Silver	Bronze	Total
1	United States	17	19	12	48
2	Jamaica	4	1	2	7
3	Canada	3	1	0	4
4	Italy	2	0	1	3
5	Botswana	1	0	0	1
5	Greece	1	0	0	1
5	Soviet Union	1	0	0	1
8	Great Britain	0	3	3	6
9	Namibia	0	2	0	2
10	Australia	0	1	1	2
11	Sri Lanka	0	1	0	1
12	Trinidad and Tobago	0	0	3	3
13	France	0	0	2	2
14	Brazil	0	0	1	1
14	Germany	0	0	1	1
14	Netherlands	0	0	1	1
14	Panama	0	0	1	1

=== Women ===
Games	Gold	Silver	Bronze
1948 London	Fanny Blankers-Koen; Netherlands	Audrey Williamson; Great Britain	Audrey Patterson; United States
1952 Helsinki	Marjorie Jackson; Australia	Bertha Brouwer; Netherlands	Nadezhda Khnykina-Dvalishvili; Soviet Union
1956 Melbourne	Betty Cuthbert; Australia	Christa Stubnick; United Team of Germany	Marlene Mathews; Australia
1960 Rome	Wilma Rudolph; United States	Jutta Heine; United Team of Germany	Dorothy Hyman; Great Britain
1964 Tokyo	Edith McGuire; United States	Irena Kirszenstein; Poland	Marilyn Black; Australia
1968 Mexico City	Irena Szewińska; Poland	Raelene Boyle; Australia	Jenny Lamy; Australia
1972 Munich	Renate Stecher; East Germany	Raelene Boyle; Australia	Irena Szewińska; Poland
1976 Montreal	Bärbel Eckert; East Germany	Annegret Richter; West Germany	Renate Stecher; East Germany
1980 Moscow	Bärbel Wöckel; East Germany	Natalya Bochina; Soviet Union	Merlene Ottey; Jamaica
1984 Los Angeles	Valerie Brisco-Hooks; United States	Florence Griffith; United States	Merlene Ottey; Jamaica
1988 Seoul	Florence Griffith Joyner; United States	Grace Jackson; Jamaica	Heike Drechsler; East Germany
1992 Barcelona	Gwen Torrence; United States	Juliet Cuthbert; Jamaica	Merlene Ottey; Jamaica
1996 Atlanta	Marie-José Pérec; France	Merlene Ottey; Jamaica	Mary Onyali; Nigeria
2000 Sydney	Pauline Davis-Thompson; Bahamas	Susanthika Jayasinghe; Sri Lanka	Beverly McDonald; Jamaica
2004 Athens	Veronica Campbell; Jamaica	Allyson Felix; United States	Debbie Ferguson; Bahamas
2008 Beijing	Veronica Campbell-Brown; Jamaica	Allyson Felix; United States	Kerron Stewart; Jamaica
2012 London	Allyson Felix; United States	Shelly-Ann Fraser-Pryce; Jamaica	Carmelita Jeter; United States
2016 Rio de Janeiro	Elaine Thompson; Jamaica	Dafne Schippers; Netherlands	Tori Bowie; United States
2020 Tokyo	Elaine Thompson-Herah; Jamaica	Christine Mboma; Namibia	Gabby Thomas; United States
2024 Paris	Gabby Thomas; United States	Julien Alfred; Saint Lucia	Brittany Brown; United States

A YouTube video showcasing all women's 200 metres' Olympic winners can be found here.

==== Multiple medalists ====
Rank	Athlete	Nation	Olympics	Gold	Silver	Bronze	Total
1	Bärbel Wöckel	East Germany	1976–1980	2	0	0	2
1	Veronica Campbell-Brown	Jamaica	2004–2008	2	0	0	2
1	Elaine Thompson-Herah	Jamaica	2016–2020	2	0	0	2
4	Allyson Felix	United States	2004–2012	1	2	0	3
5	Irena Szewińska	Poland	1964–1972	1	1	1	3
6	Florence Griffith Joyner	United States	1984–1988	1	1	0	2
7	Renate Stecher	East Germany	1972–1976	1	0	1	2
7	Gabby Thomas	United States	2020–2024	1	0	1	2
9	Raelene Boyle	Australia	1968–1972	0	2	0	2
10	Merlene Ottey	Jamaica	1980–1996	0	1	3	4

==== Medalists by country ====
Rank	Nation	Gold	Silver	Bronze	Total
1	United States	7	3	5	15
2	Jamaica	4	4	5	13
3	East Germany	3	0	2	5
4	Australia	2	2	3	7
5	Netherlands	1	2	0	3
6	Poland	1	1	1	3
7	Bahamas	1	0	1	2
8	France	1	0	0	1
9	United Team of Germany	0	2	0	2
10	Great Britain	0	1	1	2
10	Soviet Union	0	1	1	2
12	West Germany	0	1	0	1
12	Namibia	0	1	0	1
12	Saint Lucia	0	1	0	1
12	India	0	1	0	1
16	Nigeria	0	0	1	1

== Olympic record progression ==
=== Men ===
Time	Athlete	Nation	Games	Round	Date
24.0*	Bill Holland	United States	1900	Heat 1	
22.2	Walter Tewksbury	United States	1900	Final	
22.2	Archie Hahn	United States	1904	Heat 1	
21.6	Archie Hahn	United States	1904	Final	
21.6	Jackson Scholz	United States	1924	Final	
21.6	Helmut Körnig	Germany	1928	Quarterfinal 6	
21.5	Ralph Metcalfe	United States	1932	Quarterfinal 1	
21.5	Eddie Tolan	United States	1932	Quarterfinal 2	
21.4	Carlos Bianchi	Argentina	1932	Quarterfinal 3	
21.4	Arthur Jonath	Germany	1932	Quarterfinal 4	
21.2	Eddie Tolan	United States	1932	Final	
21.1	Jesse Owens	United States	1936	Heat 3	
20.7 WR	Jesse Owens	United States	1936	Final	
20.7	Andy Stanfield	United States	1952	Final	
20.6 WR	Bobby Morrow	United States	1956	Final	
20.5 WR	Livio Berruti	Italy	1960	Semifinal 2	
20.5 WR	Livio Berruti	Italy	1960	Final	
20.5	Paul Drayton	United States	1964	Semifinal 1	
20.3	Henry Carr	United States	1964	Final	
20.37	Tommie Smith	United States	1968	Heat 2	
20.23	Peter Norman	Australia	1968	Heat 6	
20.12	John Carlos	United States	1968	Semifinal 1	
19.83 WR	Tommie Smith	United States	1968	Final	
19.80	Carl Lewis	United States	1984	Final	
19.75	Joe DeLoach	United States	1988	Final	
19.73	Mike Marsh	United States	1992	Semifinal 1	
19.32 WR	Michael Johnson	United States	1996	Final	
19.30 WR	Usain Bolt	Jamaica	2008	Final	

=== Women ===
Time	Athlete	Nation	Games	Round	Date
25.7	Fanny Blankers-Koen	Netherlands	1948	Heat 1	
25.6	Cynthia Thompson	Jamaica	1948	Heat 2	
25.3	Daphne Hasenjäger	South Africa	1948	Heat 4	
24.3	Fanny Blankers-Koen	Netherlands	1948	Semifinal 1	
24.3	Nadezhda Khnykina	Soviet Union	1952	Heat 2	
23.6 WR	Marjorie Jackson	Australia	1952	Heat 3	
23.4 WR	Marjorie Jackson	Australia	1952	Semifinal 1	
23.4	Betty Cuthbert	Australia	1956	Final	
23.2	Wilma Rudolph	United States	1960	Heat 3	
23.0	Edith McGuire	United States	1964	Final	
23.09	Raelene Boyle	Australia	1968	Heat 2	
22.94	Barbara Ferrell	United States	1968	Heat 3	
22.87	Barbara Ferrell	United States	1968	Semifinal 2	
22.58	Irena Szewińska	Poland	1968	Final	
22.40 WR	Renate Stecher	East Germany	1972	Final	
22.37	Barbel Eckert	East Germany	1976	Final	
22.26	Natalya Bochina	Soviet Union	1980	Quarterfinal 3	
22.03	Barbel Eckert	East Germany	1980	Final	
21.81	Valerie Brisco-Hooks	United States	1984	Final	
21.76	Florence Griffith Joyner	United States	1988	Quarterfinal 1	
21.56 WR	Florence Griffith Joyner	United States	1988	Semifinal 1	
21.34 WR	Florence Griffith Joyner	United States	1988	Final	

== Finishing times ==
=== Top ten fastest Olympic times ===
Fastest men's times at the Olympics
Rank	Time (sec)	Athlete	Nation	Games	Date
1	19.30	Usain Bolt	Jamaica	2008	2008-08-20
2	19.32	Michael Johnson	United States	1996	1996-08-01
2	19.32	Usain Bolt	Jamaica	2012	2012-08-09
4	19.44	Yohan Blake	Jamaica	2012	2012-08-09
5	19.46	Letsile Tebogo	Botswana	2024	2024-08-08
6	19.62	Andre De Grasse	Canada	2021	2021-08-04
6	19.62	Kenny Bednarek	United States	2024	2024-08-08
8	19.68	Frankie Fredericks	Namibia	1996	1996-08-01
8	19.68	Kenneth Bednarek	United States	2021	2021-08-04
10	19.70	Noah Lyles	United States	2024	2024-08-08

Fastest women's times at the Olympics
Rank	Time (sec)	Athlete	Nation	Games	Date
1	21.34	Florence Griffith Joyner	United States	1988	1988-09-29
2	21.53	Elaine Thompson-Herah	Jamaica	2021	2021-08-03
3	21.56	Florence Griffith Joyner	United States	1988^{SF}	1988-09-29
4	21.66	Elaine Thompson-Herah	Jamaica	2021^{SF}	2021-08-02
5	21.72	Grace Jackson	Jamaica	1988	1988-09-29
5	21.72	Gwen Torrence	United States	1992^{SF}	1992-08-05
7	21.74	Veronica Campbell-Brown	Jamaica	2008	2008-08-21
8	21.75	Juliet Cuthbert	Jamaica	1992^{SF}	1992-08-05
9	21.76	Florence Griffith Joyner	United States	1988^{QF}	1988-09-28
10	21.78	Elaine Thompson	Jamaica	2016	2016-08-17

== Non-canonical Olympic events ==
In addition to the main 1900 Olympic men's 200 metres, a 220-yard dash handicap race was also held. The winner was J. McGann for the United States, who ran an estimated 22.8 seconds with a ten-yard start. Frank Lukeman of Canada was second, also with a ten-yard handicap, and American C. Turner was third with a two-yard handicap.

This event is no longer considered part of the official Olympic history of the 200 metres or the athletics programme in general. Consequently, medals from this competition have not been assigned to nations on the all-time medal tables.
