= Fay Moulton =

American sprinter, college football player and coach (1876–1945)

- Moulton during his athletic career

Biographical details
- Born: April 7, 1876; Marion, Kansas, U.S.
- Died: February 18, 1945 (aged 68); Kansas City, Missouri, U.S.

Playing career

Football
- 1898–1899: Kansas
- 1900: Kansas State

Track and field
- 1902–1903: Yale
- 1904–1906: Kansas City Athletic Club
- Positions: Halfback (football); Sprint (track and field)

Coaching career (HC unless noted)

Football
- 1900: Kansas State

Head coaching record
- Overall: 2–4
Medal record
Men's athletics
Representing the United States
Olympic Games
Bronze medal – third place	1904 St. Louis	60 metres
Intercalated Games
Silver medal – second place	1906 Athens	100 metres

Fay R. Moulton (April 7, 1876 – February 18, 1945) was an American Olympic sprinter, college football player and coach, and lawyer. He served as head football coach at Kansas State Agricultural College—now known as Kansas State University—for one season, in 1900, compiling a record of 2–4. Moulton medaled as a sprinter at the 1904 Summer Olympics and the 1906 Intercalated Games in the 60 and 100 meter events. He later worked for the United Clay Products Corporation as a secretary-treasurer and briefly practiced law in Kansas City, Missouri.

== Early life and athletic career ==
Moutlon was born on April 7, 1876, in Marion, Kansas, where he attended public school until 1895. He then took a preparatory course at Hedding College in Abingdon, Illinois.

=== University of Kansas ===
Moulton graduated from the University of Kansas, in Lawrence, Kansas, in 1900, lettering for the Kansas Jayhawks football team in the 1898 and 1899 seasons. At the University of Kansas, he was coached by Wylie G. Woodruff and Fielding H. Yost. The 1898 Kansas Jayhawks football team compiled a 7–1 record.

=== Kansas State ===
In 1900, Moulton was hired as the fifth head football coach at Kansas State Agricultural College—now known as Kansas State University—Manhattan, Kansas. He also played for the team during the season. During his one year at Kansas State, Moulton's 1900 Kansas State Aggies football team compiled a record of was 2–4, and was outscored by opponents 100–47. The two victories came against Fairmount and Kansas Wesleyan.

=== Yale Law School ===
In 1901, Moulton entered Yale Law School. He competed for the Yale track team as a sprinter before graduating from law school in 1903.

=== Kansas City Athletic Club and Olympics ===
In 1904, Moulton worked part time as a coach for the University of Kansas track team. From 1904 to 1906, he trained with the Kansas City Athletic Club in Kansas City, Missouri. There he was mentored by Martin Delaney in preparation for the 1904 Summer Olympics in St. Louis and the 1906 Intercalated Games in Athens.

Moulton won a bronze medal at the 1904 Summer Olympics in the men's 60 metre dash. He was beaten in the race by Archie Hahn, who took gold, and William Hogenson, who won silver. Moulton later competed in the 100 metres event and the 200 metres competition, finishing fourth in both events.

Two years later, Moulton won the silver medal in the 100 metres competition at the 1906 Intercalated Games, where he had a time of 11.4 in the semifinals and was observed to be in second place one yard prior to the finish. He edged out the third-place finisher Nigel Barker by only inches. Archie Hahn of the U.S. team won the gold with a time of 11.2.

== Later life ==
Moulton worked for the United Clay Products Corporation in Kansas City, as a secretary-treasurer. He also had a law practice in Kansas City. From 1925 to 1930, Moulton was vice president of the United Brick and Clay company. He died on February 18, 1945, at his home in Kansas City.

== Head coaching record ==
Year	Team	Overall	Conference	Standing	Bowl/playoffs
Kansas State Aggies (Independent) (1900)
1900	Kansas State	2–4			
Kansas State:		2–4			
Total:		2–4			
