= Athletics at the 1904 Summer Olympics – Men's 100 metres =

Men's 100 metres at the Games of the III Olympiad
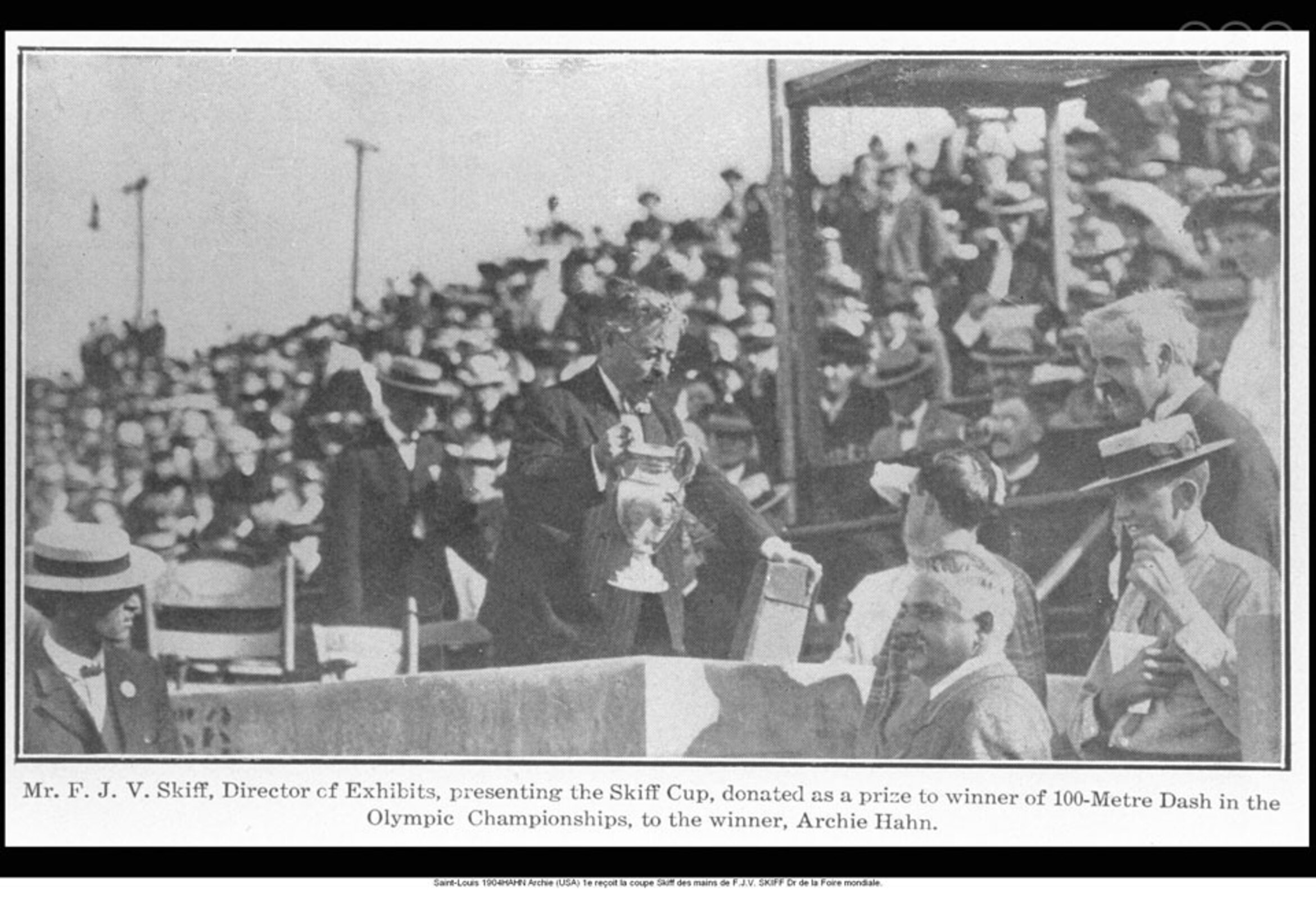
- Gold medalist Archie Hahn receiving the Skiff Cup for winning the 100 metres
- Venue: Francis Field
- Date: September 3, 1904
- Competitors: 11 from 3 nations
- Winning time: 11.0

Medalists
1st place, gold medalist(s)		Archie Hahn	United States
2nd place, silver medalist(s)		Nathaniel Cartmell	United States
3rd place, bronze medalist(s)		William Hogenson	United States

The men's 100 metres was a track and field athletics event held as part of the Athletics at the 1904 Summer Olympics programme. 11 athletes from 3 nations participated. The competition was held on September 3, 1904. The event was won by Archie Hahn of the United States, completing his sprint trifecta (having already won the 60 metres and 200 metres) and marking the third straight gold medal in the event by an American. Hahn would later repeat his win in the now-unofficial 1906 Intercalated Games. The United States swept the medals.

== Background ==
This was the third time the event was held. None of the previous runners competed in 1904. American Archie Hahn, had won the 1903 U.S. and Canadian championships; he had also taken the 60 metres and 200 metres titles earlier in the 1904 Olympics. He was heavily favored.

The 1904 competition was one of only two Olympic Games (along with 1900) where the men's 100 metres was not the shortest sprint, with the 60 metres being held in those two years.

Canada was represented in the event for the first time. Hungary was the only other country, aside from the host, to send a runner; this made the United States and Hungary the only two nations to have appeared at each of the first three Olympic men's 100 metres events.

== Competition format ==
With fewer entrants than in 1900, the event was reduced from four rounds to two: heats and a final. The top two runners in each heat advanced to the final.

== Records ==
These were the standing world and Olympic records (in seconds) prior to the 1904 Summer Olympics.

World Record	10.8(*)	(United States) Luther Cary	Paris (FRA)	July 4, 1891
World Record	10.8(*)	(United Kingdom) Cecil Lee	Brussels (BEL)	September 25, 1892
World Record	10.8(*)	(Belgium) Etienne De Re	Brussels (BEL)	August 4, 1893
World Record	10.8(*)	(United Kingdom) L. Atcherley	Frankfurt/Main (GER)	April 13, 1895
World Record	10.8(*)	(United Kingdom) Harry Beaton	Rotterdam (NED)	August 28, 1895
World Record	10.8(*)	(Sweden) Harald Anderson-Arbin	Helsingborg (SWE)	August 9, 1896
World Record	10.8(*)	(Sweden) Isaac Westergren	Gävle (SWE)	September 11, 1898
World Record	10.8(*)	(Sweden) Isaac Westergren	Gävle (SWE)	September 10, 1899
World Record	10.8(*)	(United States) Frank Jarvis	Paris (FRA)	July 14, 1900
World Record	10.8(*)	(United States) Walter Tewksbury	Paris (FRA)	July 14, 1900
World Record	10.8(*)	(Sweden) Carl Ljung	Stockholm (SWE)	September 23, 1900
World Record	10.8(*)	(United States) Walter Tewksbury	Philadelphia (USA)	October 6, 1900
World Record	10.8(*)	(France) André Passat	Bordeaux (FRA)	June 14, 1903
World Record	10.8(*)	(Switzerland) Louis Kuhn	Bordeaux (FRA)	June 14, 1903
World Record	10.8(*)	(Denmark) Harald Grønfeldt	Aarhus (DEN)	July 5, 1903
World Record	10.8(*)	(Sweden) Eric Frick	Jönköping (SWE)	August 9, 1903
Olympic Record	10.8	(United States) Frank Jarvis	Paris (FRA)	July 14, 1900
Olympic Record	10.8	(United States) Walter Tewksbury	Paris (FRA)	July 14, 1900

(*) unofficial

== Results ==
=== Heats ===
The top two finishers in each heat advanced to the final.

==== Heat 1 ====
Rank	Athlete	Nation	Time	Notes
1	Archie Hahn	United States	11.4	Q
2	Lawson Robertson	United States		Q
3	Béla Mező	Hungary		

==== Heat 2 ====
Rank	Athlete	Nation	Time	Notes
1	William Hogenson	United States	11.6	Q
2	Frederick Heckwolf	United States		Q
3	Robert Kerr	Canada		
4	Myer Prinstein	United States		

==== Heat 3 ====
Rank	Athlete	Nation	Time	Notes
1	Nathaniel Cartmell	United States	11.4	Q
2	Fay Moulton	United States		Q
3	Clyde Blair	United States		
4	Frank Castleman	United States		

=== Final ===
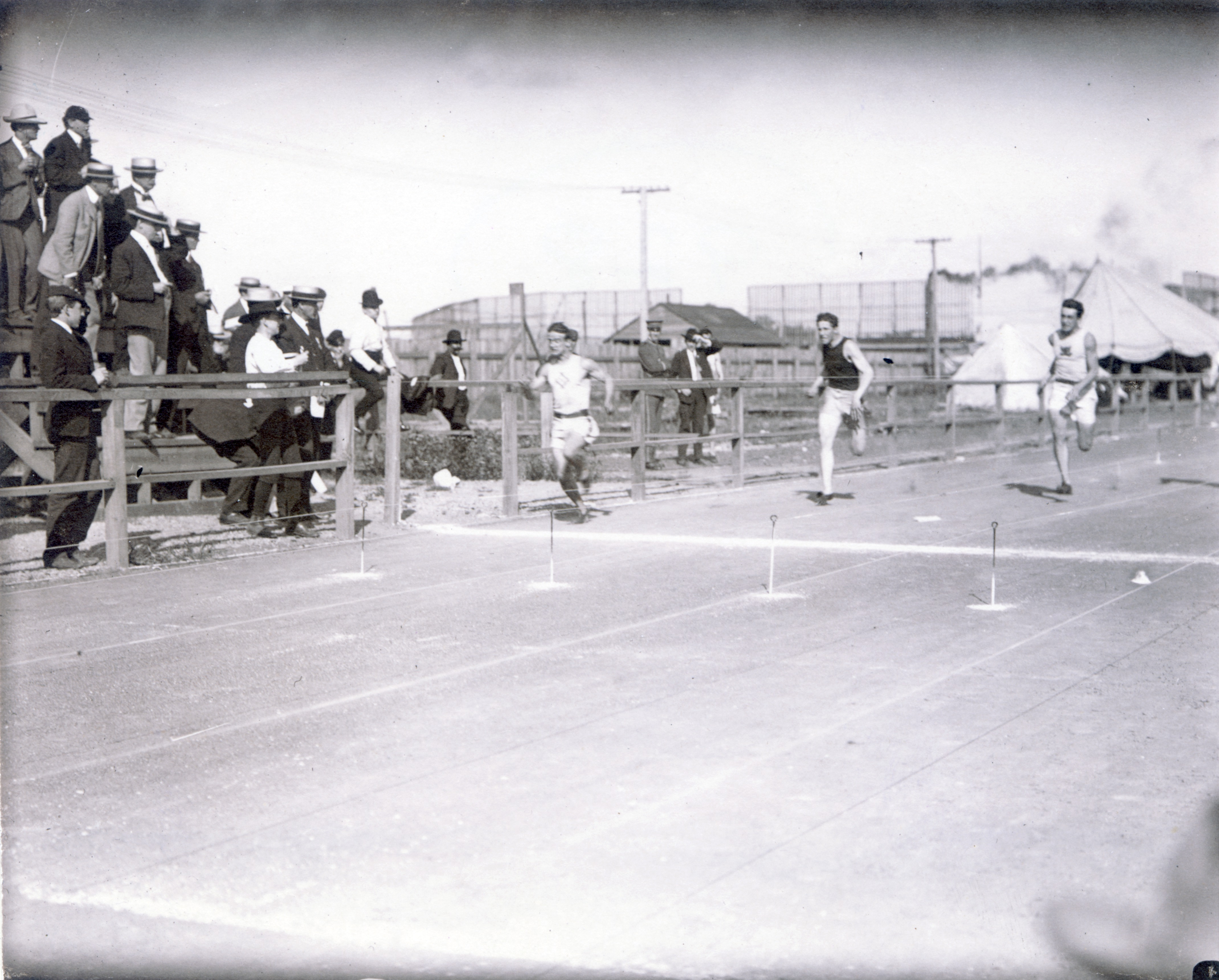
Archie Hahn winning a race

Hahn opened quickly, reaching a sizable lead within the first 20 metres. Cartmell started slowly and was in last place at 40 metres, almost halfway through the race, before finishing well and placing second.

Rank	Athlete	Nation	Time
1st place, gold medalist(s)	Archie Hahn	United States	11.0
2nd place, silver medalist(s)	Nathaniel Cartmell	United States	11.2
3rd place, bronze medalist(s)	William Hogenson	United States	11.2
4	Fay Moulton	United States	
5	Frederick Heckwolf	United States	
6	Lawson Robertson	United States	

== Results summary ==
Rank	Athlete	Nation	Heats	Final
1st place, gold medalist(s)	Archie Hahn	United States	11.4	11.0
2nd place, silver medalist(s)	Nathaniel Cartmell	United States	11.4	11.2
3rd place, bronze medalist(s)	William Hogenson	United States	11.6	11.2
4	Fay Moulton	United States	Unknown	Unknown
5	Frederick Heckwolf	United States	Unknown	Unknown
6	Lawson Robertson	United States	Unknown	Unknown
AC	Clyde Blair	United States	Unknown	Did not advance
AC	Frank Castleman	United States	Unknown	Did not advance
AC	Robert Kerr	Canada	Unknown	Did not advance
AC	Béla Mező	Hungary	Unknown	Did not advance
AC	Myer Prinstein	United States	Unknown	Did not advance
—	E. F. Annis	United States	DNS	Did not advance
—	William Hunter	United States	DNS	Did not advance
—	William Marshall	United States	DNS	Did not advance
—	Dodge Peters	United States	DNS	Did not advance
—	George Poage	United States	DNS	Did not advance
—	Ollie Snedigar	United States	DNS	Did not advance
—	Joseph Stadler	United States	DNS	Did not advance
—	Lee Vernon	Canada	DNS	Did not advance

== Sources ==
- Wudarski, Pawel (1999). "Wyniki Igrzysk Olimpijskich" (in Polish).
