= Athletics at the 1904 Summer Olympics – Men's 200 metres =

Men's 200 metres at the Games of the III Olympiad
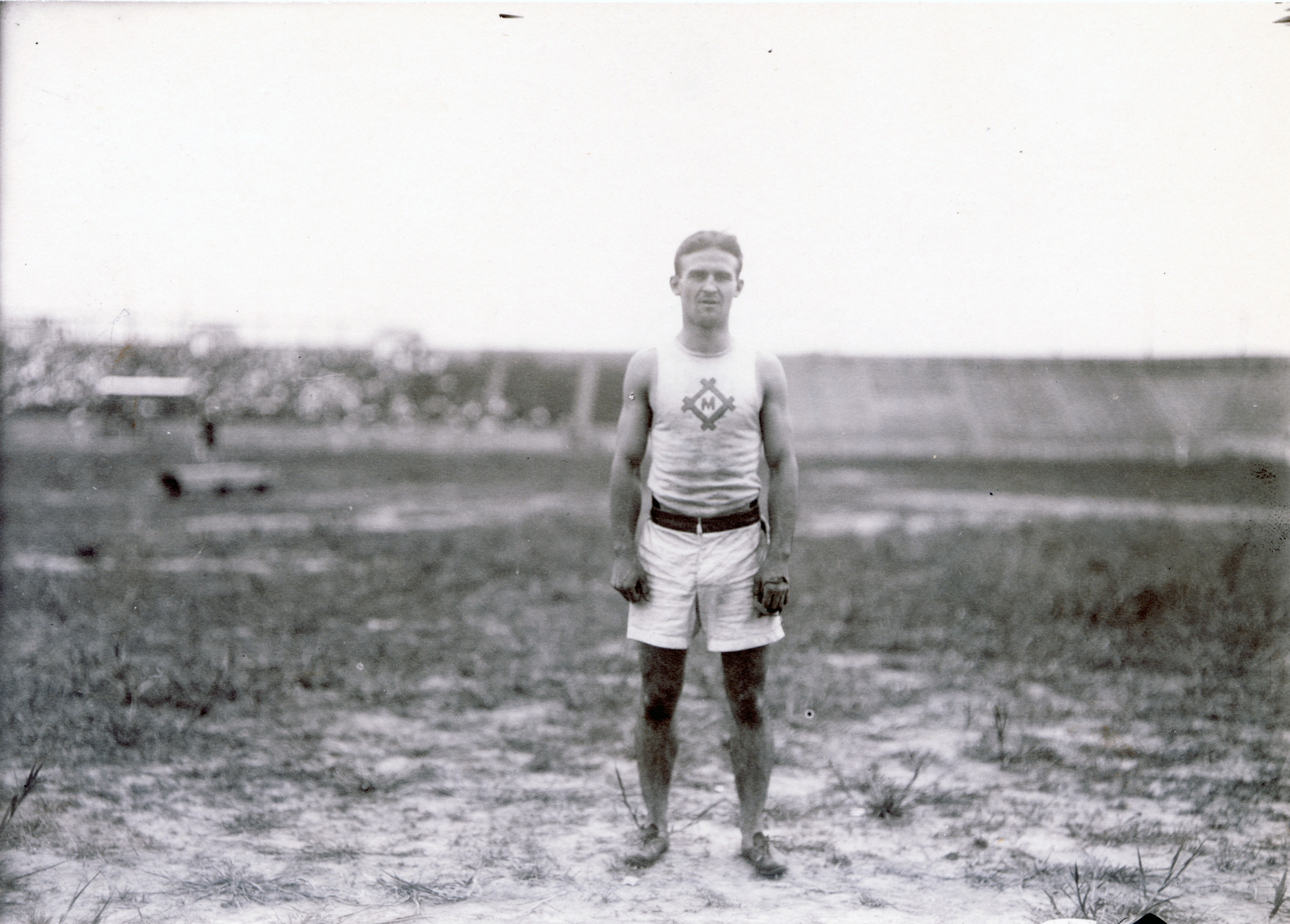
- Archie Hahn
- Venue: Francis Field
- Date: August 31, 1904
- Competitors: 5 from 2 nations
- Winning time: 21.6 OR

Medalists
1st place, gold medalist(s)		Archie Hahn; United States
2nd place, silver medalist(s)		Nathaniel Cartmell; United States
3rd place, bronze medalist(s)		William Hogenson; United States

The men's 200 metres was a track and field athletics event held as part of the Athletics at the 1904 Summer Olympics programme. It was the second time the 200 metres was contested. All races of this competition was held on a straight course. 5 athletes from 3 nations participated. The competition was held on August 31, 1904. The United States swept the medals, with Archie Hahn earning the second of his three sprint medals in St. Louis. Nathaniel Cartmell took silver and William Hogenson earned bronze. It was the second consecutive American victory in the event.

== Background ==
This was the second appearance of the event, which was not held at the first Olympics in 1896 but has been on the program ever since. None of the runners from the 1900 Games returned. The favorite was Archie Hahn, who had already won the 60 metres and was attempting to triple in the sprint events with the 100 metres held a few days later. All five of the runners had been in the top 8 of the 60 metres.

Canada made its debut in the event. The United States made its second appearance, the only nation to have competed at both of the first two 200 metres races.

== Competition format ==
There were two rounds, semifinals and a final. The top two runners in each of the two semifinals advanced to the final. The track was a 1/3-mile cinder track with one straightaway longer than the other three straights.

== Records ==
These were the standing world and Olympic records (in seconds) prior to the 1904 Summer Olympics.

World record	Jim Maybury (USA)^{*}	21.4	Chicago, United States	5 June 1897
Olympic record	Walter Tewksbury (USA)^{**}	22.2	Paris, France	22 July 1900

^{*} unofficial 220 yards (= 201.17 m)

^{**} This track was 500 metres in circumference.

Archie Hahn first equalled the standing Olympic record in the first heat, and then set a new Olympic record with 21.6 seconds in the final.

== Schedule ==
Date	Time	Round
Wednesday, 31 August 1904		Semifinals; Final

== Results ==
=== Semifinals ===
The top two finishers in each heat advanced to the final.

==== Semifinal 1 ====
Rank	Athlete	Nation	Time	Notes
1	Archie Hahn	United States	22.2	Q, =OR
2	Nathaniel Cartmell	United States	Unknown	Q

==== Semifinal 2 ====
Rank	Athlete	Nation	Time	Notes
1	William Hogenson	United States	22.8	Q
2	Fay Moulton	United States	Unknown	Q
3	Robert Kerr	Canada	Unknown	

=== Final ===
Cartmell, Hogenson, and Moulton were all penalized one yard for false starts. Hahn lead from the start, with Cartmell well behind within the first 20 metres. Cartmell began to gain on the field after 75 metres, catching Moulton and Hogenson but not Hahn.

Rank	Athlete	Nation	Time	Notes
1st place, gold medalist(s)	Archie Hahn	United States	21.6	OR
2nd place, silver medalist(s)	Nathaniel Cartmell	United States	21.9	
3rd place, bronze medalist(s)	William Hogenson	United States	Unknown	
4	Fay Moulton	United States	Unknown	

== Results summary ==
Rank	Athlete	Nation	Semifinals	Final	Notes
1st place, gold medalist(s)	Archie Hahn	United States	22.2	21.6	OR
2nd place, silver medalist(s)	Nathaniel Cartmell	United States	Unknown	21.9	
3rd place, bronze medalist(s)	William Hogenson	United States	22.8	Unknown	
4	Fay Moulton	United States	Unknown	Unknown	
5	Robert Kerr	Canada	Unknown	Did not advance	
—	Clyde Blair	United States	DNS	Did not advance	
—	Frank Castleman	United States	DNS	Did not advance	
—	Clay Foster	United States	DNS	Did not advance	
—	Herman Groman	United States	DNS	Did not advance	
—	Harry Hillman	United States	DNS	Did not advance	
—	Frank Lukeman	Canada	DNS	Did not advance	
—	William Marshall	United States	DNS	Did not advance	
—	Béla Mező	Hungary	DNS	Did not advance	
—	Percival Molson	Canada	DNS	Did not advance	
—	Myer Prinstein	United States	DNS	Did not advance	
—	Lawson Robertson	United States	DNS	Did not advance	
—	Charles Turner	United States	DNS	Did not advance	

== Sources ==
- Wudarski, Pawel (1999). "Wyniki Igrzysk Olimpijskich" (in Polish).
