= Mező =

Mező is a Hungarian surname. Notable people with this surname include:

- Béla Mező (1883–1954), Hungarian track and field athlete
- Ferenc Mező (1885–1961), Hungarian poet
- Mihály Mező (born 1978), Hungarian singer and musician
