= Athletics at the 1904 Summer Olympics – Men's 60 metres =

Men's 60 metres at the Games of the III Olympiad
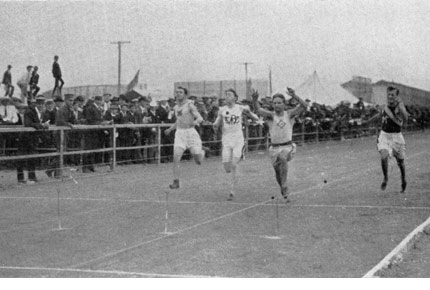
- Finish of 60 metres event
- Venue: Francis Field
- Date: August 29, 1904
- Competitors: 12 from 3 nations
- Winning time: 7.0 =OR

Medalists
1st place, gold medalist(s)		Archie Hahn; United States
2nd place, silver medalist(s)		William Hogenson; United States
3rd place, bronze medalist(s)		Clyde Blair; United States

The men's 60 metres was a track and field athletics event held as part of the Athletics at the 1904 Summer Olympics programme. It was the second and last time the event was held at the Olympics. 12 athletes from 3 nations participated. The competition was held on August 29, 1904. The event was won by Archie Hahn of the United States, with William Hogenson second and Clyde Blair third as the host nation swept the medals. It was the first of three gold medals in the sprints won by Hahn in 1904.

== Background ==
This was the second and last time the event was held; it was held previously only in 1900. The 60 metres would become a staple of indoor athletics, while the outdoor athletics found in the Olympics would have 100 metres as its shortest sprint. None of the runners from 1900 returned. Favorites included 1903 AAU 100 metres champion Archie Hahn, 1904 AAU 100 metres champion Lawson Robertson, 1903 IC4A 100 metres champion Fay Moulton, and 1904 IC4A 100 metres runner-up Nathaniel Cartmell. American George Poage was the first black man to compete in athletics at the Olympics with his appearance in this event's semifinals; he would become the first black man to medal in athletics when he took bronze in both the 200 and 400 metres hurdles.

Canada made its debut in the event. Hungary and the United States each competed for the second time, the only two nations to compete at both 60 metres events.

== Records ==
These were the standing world and Olympic records (in seconds) prior to the 1904 Summer Olympics.

World record		none		
Olympic record	Alvin Kraenzlein (USA)	7.0	Paris, France	15 July 1900

Clyde Blair, William Hogenson, and Archie Hahn repeated the Olympic record of 7.0 seconds.

== Competition format ==
The competition consisted of three rounds: semifinals, a repechage, and a final. The top runner in each of the four semifinals advanced directly to the final. The second-place runner in each semifinal competed in the repechage. The top two men in the repechage also advanced to the final.

== Schedule ==
Date	Time	Round
Monday, 29 August 1904		Semifinals; Repechage; Final

== Results ==
=== Semifinals ===
Top finisher in each heat advanced to the final, second place earned another chance in the repechage.

==== Semifinal 1 ====
Rank	Athlete	Nation	Time	Notes
1	Clyde Blair	United States	7.0	Q, =OR
2	Myer Prinstein	United States	Unknown	R
3–4	William Hunter	United States	Unknown	
3–4	George Poage	United States	Unknown	

==== Semifinal 2 ====
Rank	Athlete	Nation	Time	Notes
1	William Hogenson	United States	7.0	Q, =OR
2	Frank Castleman	United States	Unknown	R

==== Semifinal 3 ====
Rank	Athlete	Nation	Time	Notes
1	Archie Hahn	United States	7.2	Q
2	Robert Kerr	Canada	Unknown	R
3	Lawson Robertson	United States	Unknown	
4	Béla Mező	Hungary	Unknown	

==== Semifinal 4 ====
Rank	Athlete	Nation	Time	Notes
1	Fay Moulton	United States	7.2	Q
2	Nathaniel Cartmell	United States	Unknown	R

=== Repechage ===
Of the four runners in the repechage, the top two moved on to the final.

Rank	Athlete	Nation	Time	Notes
1	Frank Castleman	United States	7.2	Q
2	Myer Prinstein	United States	7.2	Q
3–4	Nathaniel Cartmell	United States	Unknown	
3–4	Robert Kerr	Canada	Unknown	

=== Final ===
Rank	Athlete	Nation	Time	Notes
1st place, gold medalist(s)	Archie Hahn	United States	7.0	=OR
2nd place, silver medalist(s)	William Hogenson	United States	7.2	
3rd place, bronze medalist(s)	Fay Moulton	United States	7.2	
4	Clyde Blair	United States	7.2	
5	Myer Prinstein	United States	Unknown	
6	Frank Castleman	United States	Unknown	

== Results summary ==
Rank	Athlete	Nation	Heats	Repechage	Final	Notes
1st place, gold medalist(s)	Archie Hahn	United States	7.2	Bye	7.0	=OR
2nd place, silver medalist(s)	William Hogenson	United States	7.0	Bye	7.2	=OR
3rd place, bronze medalist(s)	Fay Moulton	United States	7.2	Bye	7.2	
4	Clyde Blair	United States	7.0	Bye	7.2	=OR
5	Myer Prinstein	United States	Unknown	7.2	Unknown	
6	Frank Castleman	United States	Unknown	7.2	Unknown	
AC	Nathaniel Cartmell	United States	Unknown	Unknown	Did not advance	
AC	Robert Kerr	Canada	Unknown	Unknown	Did not advance	
AC	William Hunter	United States	Unknown	Did not advance		
AC	Béla Mező	Hungary	Unknown	Did not advance		
AC	George Poage	United States	Unknown	Did not advance		
AC	Lawson Robertson	United States	Unknown	Did not advance		
—	Will Blome	United States	DNS	Did not advance		
—	Fred Heckwolf	United States	DNS	Did not advance		
—	William Marshall	United States	DNS	Did not advance		
—	Dodge Peters	United States	DNS	Did not advance		
—	George Smit	United States	DNS	Did not advance		
—	Ollie Snedigar	United States	DNS	Did not advance		
—	Charles Turner	United States	DNS	Did not advance		

== Sources ==
- Wudarski, Pawel (1999). "Wyniki Igrzysk Olimpijskich" (in Polish).
