= Frederick Heckwolf =

American sprinter

Frederick J. Heckwolf (January 7, 1879 – March 21, 1924) was an American track and field athlete, a member of the Missouri Athletic Club, St Louis, who competed in the 1904 Summer Olympics.

In 1904 he was fifth in the 100 m sprint competition where he recorded a time of 11.6 seconds.
