= Nathaniel Cartmell =

American athlete (1883–1967)

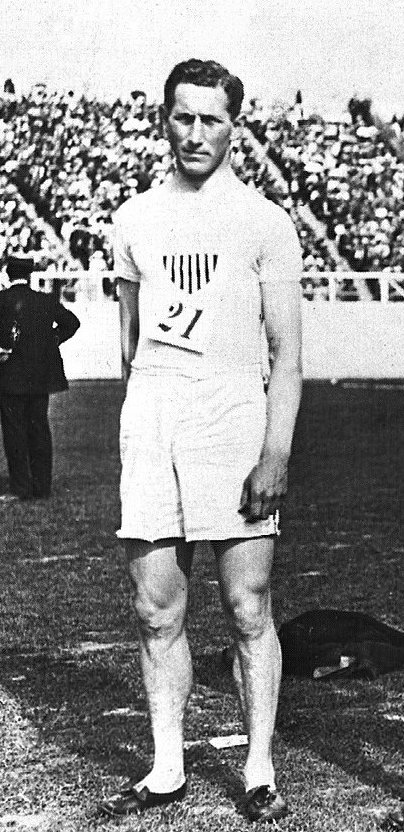
- Cartmell at the 1908 Olympics

Personal information
- Full name: Nathaniel John Cartmell
- Born: January 13, 1883 Uniontown, Kentucky, U.S.
- Died: August 23, 1967 (aged 84) Forest Hills, New York, U.S.
- Height: 6 ft 0 in (183 cm)
- Weight: 157 lb (71 kg)

Sport
- Sport: Athletics
- Event: 100–400 m
- Club: University of Pennsylvania; Louisville YMCA

Achievements and titles
- Personal bests: 100 m – 11.0 (1908); 200 m – 21.5 (1907)); 400 m – 50.1 (1909)
Medal record
Representing the United States
Olympic Games
Gold medal – first place	1908 London	Medley relay
Silver medal – second place	1904 St. Louis	100 m
Silver medal – second place	1904 St. Louis	200 m
Bronze medal – third place	1908 London	200 m

Nathaniel John Cartmell (January 13, 1883 – August 23, 1967), also known as Nat and Nate, was an American athlete who won medals at two editions of the Olympic Games. Importantly, Nate was on first racially integrated Men's Medley relay team that won Olympic gold medal at the 1908 London Olympics, which Nate helped form and featured Nate's fellow University of Pennsylvania alumnus and former teammate, Dr. John Baxter Taylor Jr., the first black athlete in America to win a gold medal in the Olympics. Nate is also known for being the first head coach of the North Carolina Tar Heels men's basketball team

== Nickname ==
While the reason why Cartmell was nicknamed "Bloody Neck" is not entirely known, author Ken Rappoport speculates that it either comes from his use of the term Bloody due to the fact his family came from Cartmel, England, or from the fact that he had a childhood accident where he lost two and a half fingers from his right hand when an ax slipped while he was chopping wood.

== 1904 Summer Olympics ==
In the 1904 Summer Olympics in St. Louis, Missouri, Cartmell won silver medals in both the 100 meter dash and the 200 meter straightaway. He also participated in the 60 meters event but was eliminated in the repechage.

== 1908 Summer Olympics ==
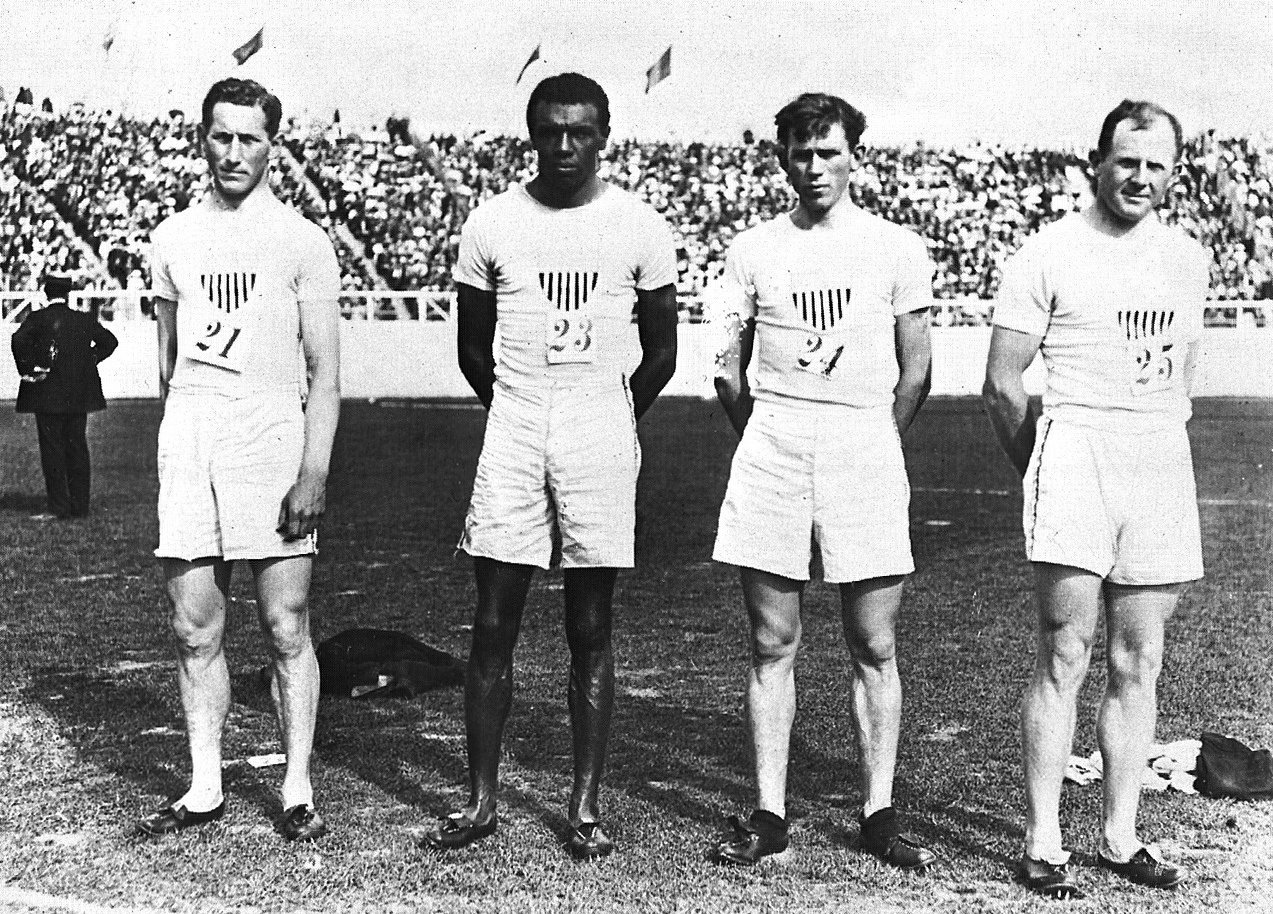
The members of Men's Medley relay team that won Olympic gold medals at the 1908 London Olympics. Left to Right, Nate Cartmell (University of Pennsylvania alumnus and future track and first basketball coach of University of North Carolina), Dr. John Taylor (athlete), (University of Pennsylvania School of Veterinary Medicine (Class of 1908), first black athlete in America to win a gold medal, Mel Sheppard and William Hamilton.

Cartmell was a member of the gold medal American medley relay team at the 1908 Summer Olympics in London. He was the second runner on the squad, running 200 meters. He followed William Hamilton and was followed by John Taylor and Mel Sheppard. In both the first round heat and the final Cartmell received a lead from Hamilton and built upon it before turning over the race to Taylor. The team won both races, running the 1,600 meters in 3:27.2 in the first round and 3:29.4 in the final. Cartmell's split for the final was 22.2 seconds.

He won the bronze medal in the 200 meter race at the same Games, taking his second medal in the event. In the first round, Cartmell won with a time of 23.0 seconds. The second round resulted in a 22.6-second time and another win. Cartmell placed third in the final with a time of 22.7 seconds.

In the 100 meters, Cartmell placed fourth. He won his first round heat and semifinal with times of 11.0 and 11.2 seconds, respectively. He ran the final in 11.0 seconds.

=== Anecdote about run-in with policeman ===
While at the 1908 Olympics, Cartmell reportedly got into a fight with a policeman who "thrust himself into [Cartmell's] face and jabbered something". In response, Cartmell took the policeman's hand, pushed him and then ran off knowing that the policeman could not catch him on foot. Later, the police showed up at the hotel where the track team for the U.S. team was staying and arrested Charles Hollaway, another member of the team that looked like Cartmell. Cartmell later found out about the mistaken arrest and tried to do something about it, but by the time Cartmell got to the police station Hollaway had already been bailed out and nothing more became of it.

== North Carolina head coach ==
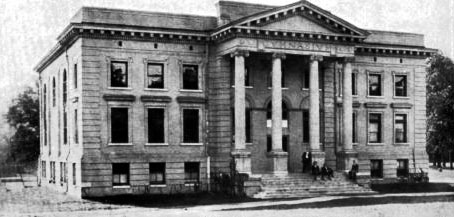
Bynum Gymnasium, the first home of the North Carolina Tar Heels

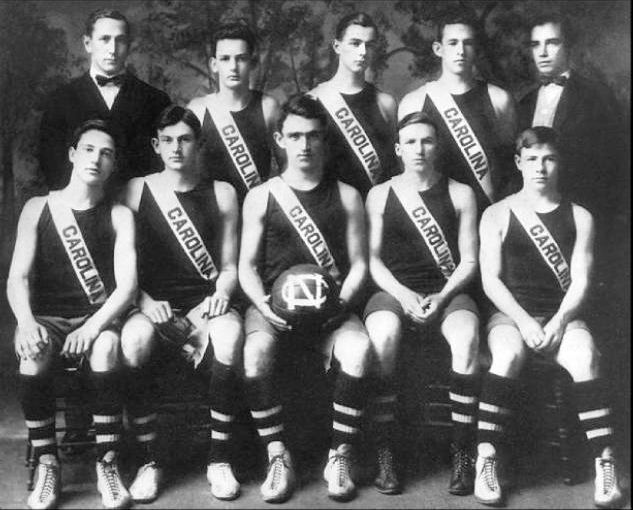
Coach Nathaniel Cartmell and the 1910–11 men's basketball team

Cartmell came to UNC in 1909 as a track-and-field coach for the Tar Heels. In 1910, student Marvin Rich along with certain school officials helped lobby to create a varsity basketball squad at UNC. There was no coach for this basketball program, and UNC did not have enough money at the time to hire another full-time coach for this sport. Cartmell was asked to be the first coach even though he did not know much about the sport. Cartmell coached his first college basketball game on January 27, 1910, when UNC's varsity basketball team played in their first intercollegiate basketball game in Bynum Gymnasium against Virginia Christian College, which later became Lynchburg College. The Tar Heels won their first game 42–21. The Tar Heels would end their first season with a 7–4 record.

In 1914, Cartmell was charged with illegally playing dice with known gamblers and was fired after the 1914 season in May. He would be replaced by Charles Doak.

== Later life ==
Cartmell went on to coach track and sometimes basketball at West Virginia University, Princeton University, Fordham University, Manhattan College and LaSalle Military Academy. He also coached track and field and cross country at Penn State from 1923 to 1933 before ending his career at the United States Military Academy in 1956. Recognized as one of the most respected athletes and coaches of his era, Nathaniel John Cartmell died in his home in New York City on August 23, 1967.

Cartmell served as the track coach at his alma mater, the University of Pennsylvania.

=== Basketball ===
Record table
Season	Team	Overall	Conference	Standing	Postseason
North Carolina Tar Heels (Independent) (1910–1914)
1910–11	North Carolina	7–4			
1911–12	North Carolina	4–5			
1912–13	North Carolina	4–7			
1913–14	North Carolina	10–8			
North Carolina:		25–24			
Total:		25–24			

== See also ==
- List of Pennsylvania State University Olympians
