= William Hogenson =

American athlete (1884–1965)

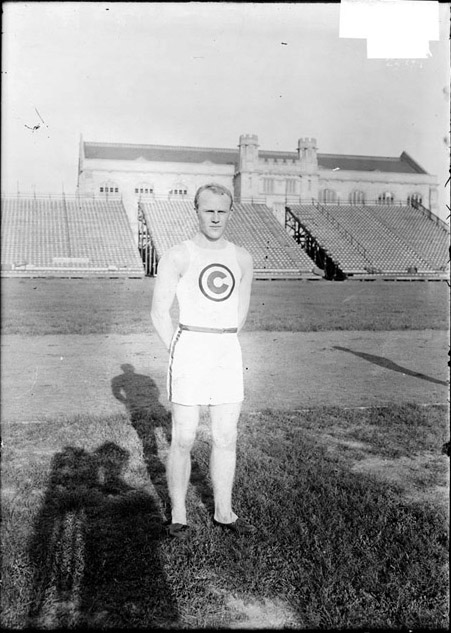
- Hogenson in 1904

Medal record

Men's athletics

Representing the United States

Olympic Games
Silver medal – second place	1904 St. Louis	60 metres
Bronze medal – third place	1904 St. Louis	100 metres
Bronze medal – third place	1904 St. Louis	200 metres

William P. Hogenson (October 26, 1884 – October 14, 1965) was an American athlete and sprinter, who competed in the early twentieth century. He won a silver medal in Athletics at the 1904 Summer Olympics in the men's 60 m dash, but was beaten by Archie Hahn, who took gold. He also won two bronze medals, over 100 m and 200 m, both distances won by Archie Hahn of the United States.
