= William Hunter (American athlete) =

American sprinter (1883–1966)

William Bridges Hunter (February 19, 1883 – August 25, 1966) was an American track and field athlete who competed in the 1904 Summer Olympics. He competed in the 60 metres. He did not make it out of the heats, finishing outside the top two and so failing to qualify automatically or for the repechage.

== See also ==
- United States at the 1904 Summer Olympics

== Sources ==
- Evans, Hilary; Gjerde, Arild; Heijmans, Jeroen; Mallon, Bill; et al. "Will Hunter". Olympics at Sports-Reference.com. Sports Reference LLC. Archived from the original on April 17, 2020.
