= Clyde Blair =

American sprinter

Clyde Amel Blair (September 16, 1881 in Fort Scott, Kansas – September 3, 1953 in Santa Barbara, California) was an American track and field athlete who competed in the 1904 Summer Olympics. In 1904 he was fourth in 60 m competition and was third in his first round heat of 100 m competition and did not advance to the final. He also participated in the final of 400 m competition, but his exact placement is unknown.
