= Béla Mező =

Hungarian sprinter and long jumper

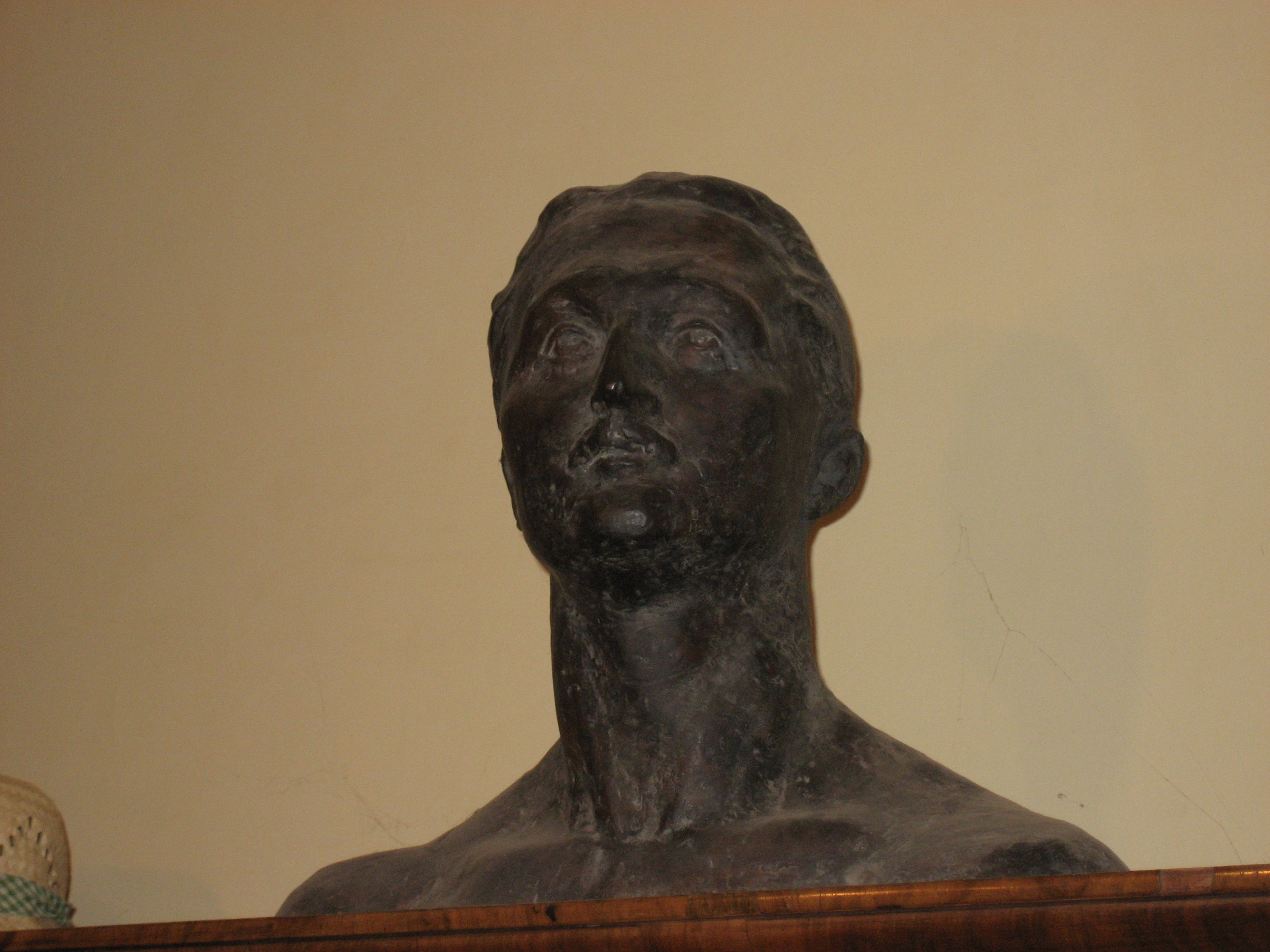
Bust of Béla Mező

Dr. Béla Elemér Mező (1 July 1883, in Nagyfalu – 17 April 1954, in Budapest) was a Hungarian track and field athlete who competed at the 1904 Summer Olympics.

== Biography ==
In 1904 he was third in his first round heat of 100 m competition and did not advance to the final. In the 60 metres event he was also eliminated in the first round after finishing fourth in his heat, he was nearly disqualified due to two false starts but the other athletes in his heat refused him to be penalized.

He also participated in the long jump competition but his exact result is unknown. In all three events he was the only European competitor.

A member of the Hungarian Athletic Club (MAC) he set records in the 100 yard event winning national championships and was awarded the Hungarian Perpetual Champion trophy in 1903. He was selected to represent Hungary at the 1904 Olympics in St Louis.

Unfortunately due to the rough transatlantic crossing and related stomach ailments he did not compete in full form, ran his Olympic heats quite unwell and was not able to match his championship performance levels.

Following his sports career he became a well-respected surgeon and adjunct professor of the medical school, held several patents including a surgical powder used widely to treat post op wounds. In his later years he developed special treatments based on the sympathetic nervous system of the body.

Dr. Mező loved the outdoors as an avid hunter and wild life conservationist and later as a fisherman. He was active in his profession until the end of his life.
