= Archie Hahn (sprinter) =

American athlete, sports coach (1880–1955)

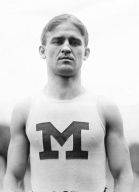
- Hahn in 1904

Biographical details
- Born: September 14, 1880; Dodgeville, Wisconsin, U.S.
- Died: January 21, 1955 (aged 74); Charlottesville, Virginia, U.S.

Playing career

Track and field
- 1901–1904: Michigan

Coaching career (HC unless noted)

Football
- 1904: Ironwood HS (MI)
- 1907–1908: Pacific (OR)
- 1910: Monmouth (IL)
- 1911–1914: Whitman
- 1915–1919: Brown (backfield)
- 1920–1922: Michigan (trainer)

Basketball
- 1910–1911: Monmouth (IL)
- 1911–?: Whitman

Track and field
- 1904–1905: Ironwood HS (MI)
- 1911–1915: Whitman
- 1915–1920: Brown
- 1920–1923: Michigan (assistant)
- 1928: Princeton
- 1929–1950: Virginia

Administrative career (AD unless noted)
- 1907–1909: Pacific (OR)
- 1910–1911: Monmouth (IL)
- 1911–1915: Whitman

Head coaching record
- Overall: 10–26–1 (college football)
Medal record
Men's athletics
Representing the United States
Olympic Games
Gold medal – first place	1904 St. Louis	60 metres
Gold medal – first place	1904 St. Louis	100 metres
Gold medal – first place	1904 St. Louis	200 metres
Intercalated Games
Gold medal – first place	1906 Athens	100 metres

Charles Archibald Hahn (September 14, 1880 – January 21, 1955) was an American track athlete and is widely regarded as one of the best sprinters of the early 20th century. He is the first athlete to win both the 100 m and 200 m race at the same Olympic Games.

== Biography ==
Having won sprint events at the 1903 American and Canadian championships, Hahn— born in Dodgeville, Wisconsin, but running for the University of Michigan— was among the favorites at the 1904 Olympic Games in St. Louis, which was poorly attended by European athletes.

In the first event at those Games, the 60 m, Hahn benefited from his quick start and won, making him a favorite for the remaining events he was entered in, the 100 m and 200 m. His run in the 200 m final delivered him the gold and a good time, although the latter was flattered, because the race was run on a straight course. In his third event, he again outclassed the field, thus winning all sprint events.

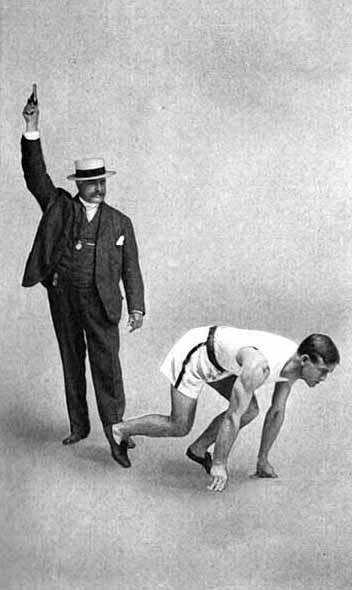
Hahn in 1904

In 1906, the "Milwaukee Meteor" repeated his Olympic 100 m victory in Athens, a feat not equaled until 1988, when Carl Lewis won the 100 m twice in a row (after the disqualification of Ben Johnson). In 1910 he outran a racehorse in a 50-yard dash at the Wisconsin State Fair.

After his running career, Hahn became a coach and wrote the classic book How to Sprint issued by the Spalding Athletic Library collection which was published by American Sports Publishing Co. He coached track and number of other sports at Pacific University in Forest Grove, Oregon, Monmouth College in Monmouth, Illinois, Whitman College, Brown University, Michigan, Princeton University, and the University of Virginia. At Virginia he led the Cavaliers to 12 state championships in 13 years. He died in 1955, in Charlottesville, Virginia.

In 1929 Hahn's book "How to Sprint" was issued by the Spalding Athletic Library.

Hahn was elected to the Wisconsin Athletic Hall of Fame in 1959. He was inducted into the University of Michigan Athletic Hall of Honor in 1984 and the Virginia Sports Hall of Fame in 1991.

He is the grandfather of the actor / comedian Archie Hahn.

== Head coaching record ==
=== College football ===
Year	Team	Overall	Conference	Standing	Bowl/playoffs
Pacific Badgers (Independent) (1907–1908)
1907	Pacific	3–3			
1908	Pacific	2–3			
Pacific:		5–6			
Monmouth Fighting Scots (Independent) (1910)
1910	Monmouth	1–6–1			
Monmouth:		1–6–1			
Whitman Fighting Missionaries (Northwest Conference) (1911–1914)
1911	Whitman	1–4	0–4	6th	
1912	Whitman	2–2	2–2	T–2nd	
1913	Whitman	1–4	0–4	6th	
1914	Whitman	0–4	0–4	6th	
Whitman:		4–14	2–14		
Total:		10–26–1			

Preceded by George A. May	Michigan Wolverines football trainer 1920–1922	Succeeded by Charles B. Hoyt & William Fallon
