= Frank Castleman =

American hurdler and coach

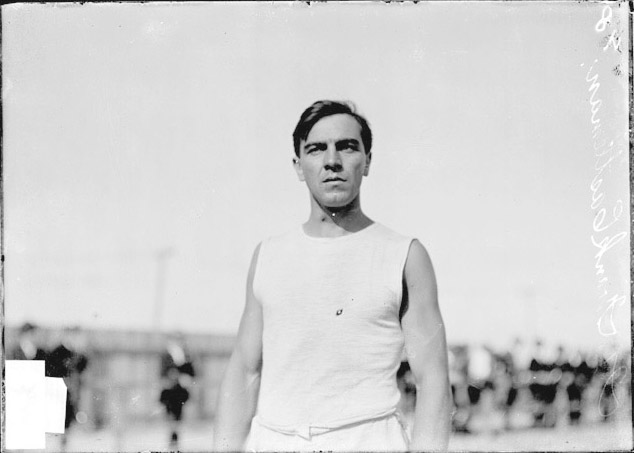
- Castleman in 1904

Biographical details
- Born: March 17, 1877; Tracy Creek, New York, U.S.
- Died: October 9, 1946 (aged 69); Columbus, Ohio, U.S.

Playing career

Football
- 1902–1905: Colgate

Coaching career (HC unless noted)

Football
- 1906–1907: Colorado

Basketball
- 1906–1912: Colorado

Baseball
- 1907–1913: Colorado

Track
- 1913–1931: Ohio State

Head coaching record
- Overall: 7–6–4 (football); 32–22 (basketball); 30–17 (baseball)
Medal record
Men's athletics
Representing the United States
Olympic Games
Silver medal – second place	1904 St Louis	200 metre hurdles

Frank Riley Castleman (March 17, 1877 – October 9, 1946) was an American football and baseball player, track athlete, and coach in multiple sports. He competed for the United States in the 200 metre hurdles at the 1904 Summer Olympics held in St. Louis, Missouri, where he won the silver medal. Castleman was a member of the Greater New York Irish American Athletic Association, which became the Irish American Athletic Club. He competed mainly in the 200 metre hurdles. Castleman graduated from Colgate University in 1906, where he competed in football, baseball, and track and field.

Castleman served as the head football coach at the University of Colorado at Boulder in 1906 and 1907, compiling a record of 7–6–4. He was also the head basketball coach at Colorado in from 1906 to 1912, tallying a mark of 32–22, and the head baseball coach at the school from 1907 to 1913, amassing a record of 30–17. He was later the track coach at Ohio State University, where his team won the 1929 NCAA Men's Track and Field Championships.

Castleman died at his home in Columbus, Ohio, on October 9, 1946, at the age of 69.

== Head coaching record ==
=== Football ===
Year	Team	Overall	Conference	Standing
Colorado Silver and Gold (Colorado Football Association) (1906–1907)
1906	Colorado	2–3–4	1–1–2	T–2nd
1907	Colorado	5–3	2–2	3rd
Colorado:		7–6–4	3–3–2	
Total:		7–6–4		
