= Sprint (running) =

Running over a short distance in a limited period of time

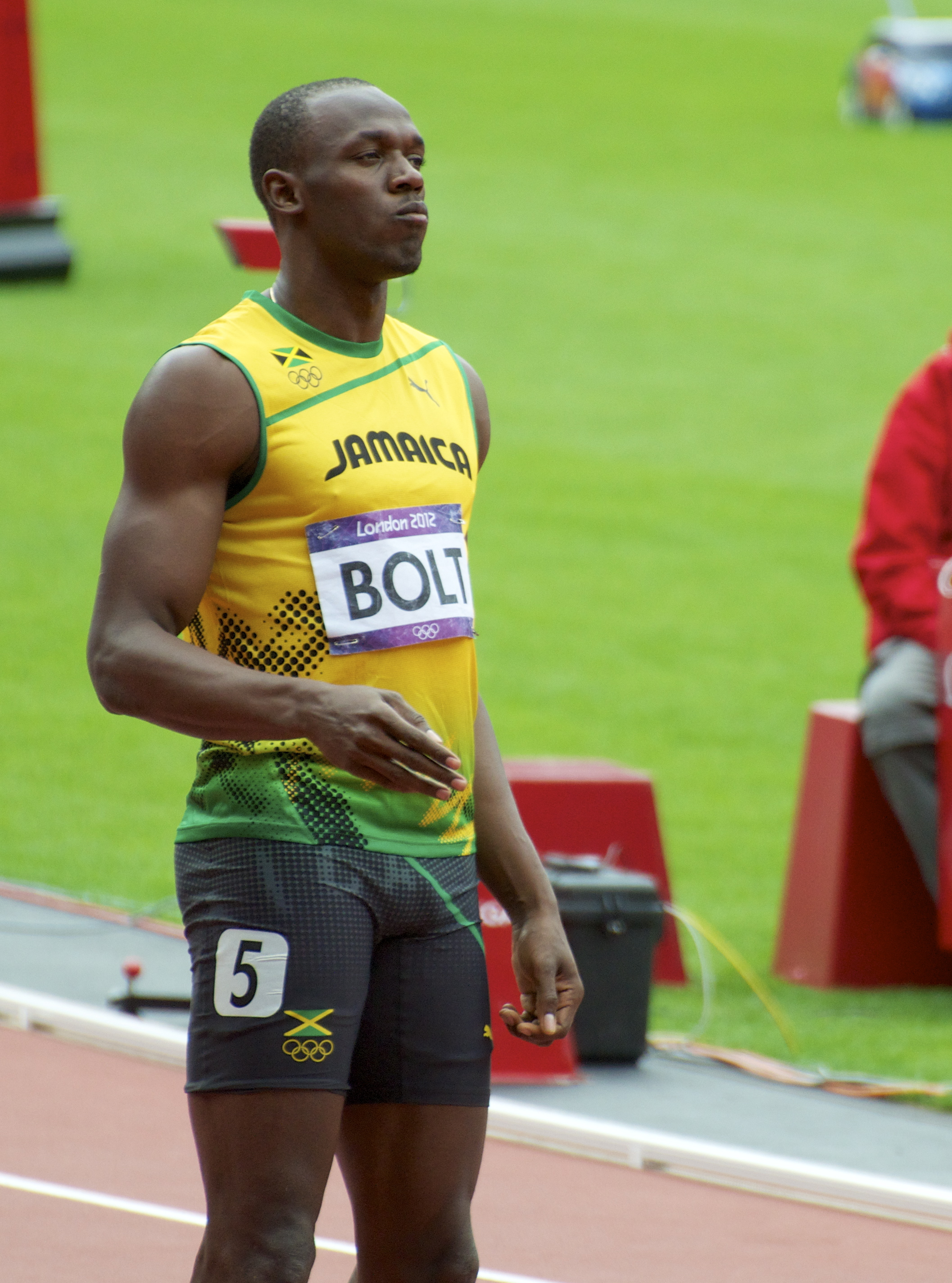
Usain Bolt, world record holder in 100 m and 200 m sprints

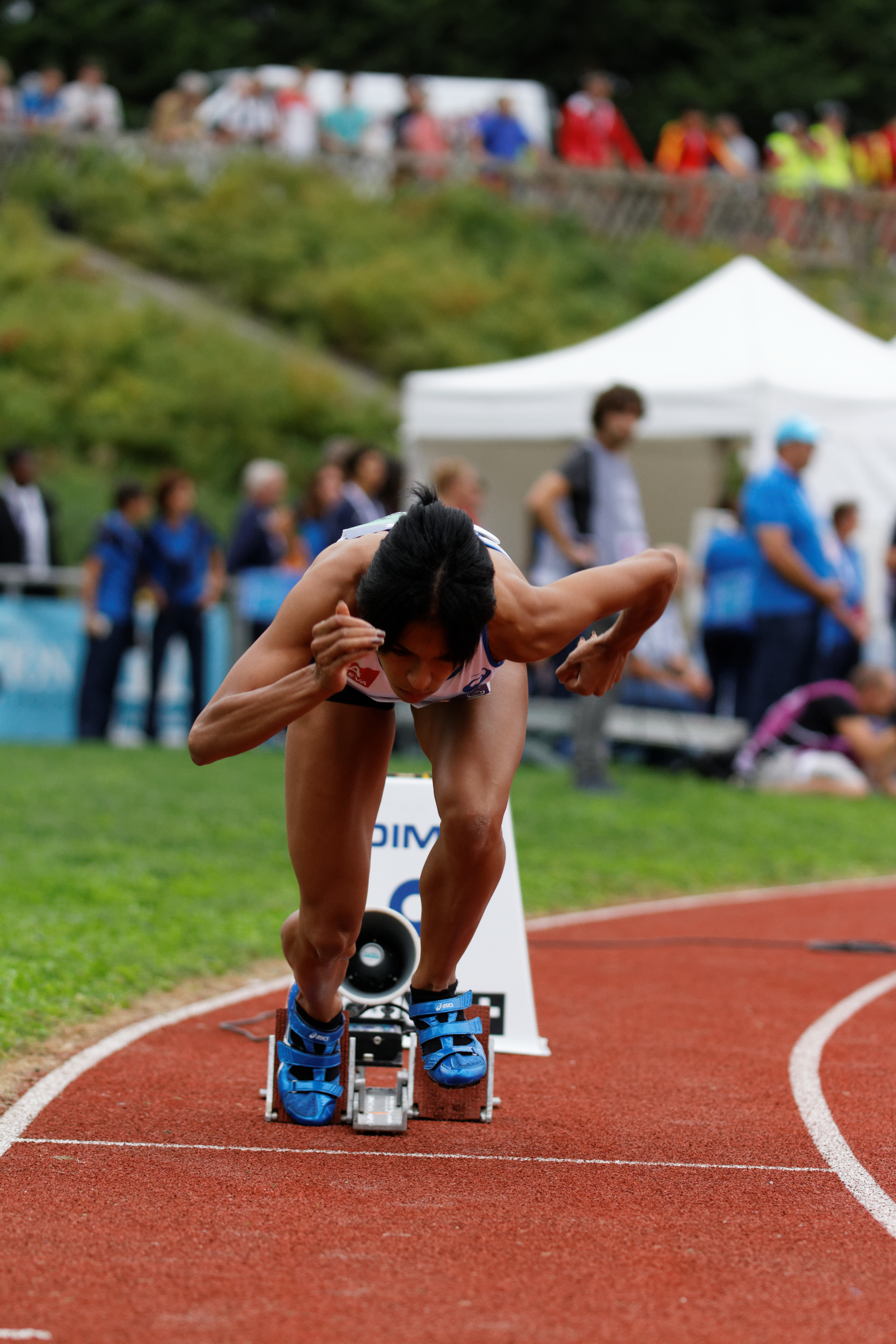
This sprinter's initial crouch in the blocks allowed her to preload her muscles and channel the force generated from this into her first strides.

Sprinting is running as fast as possible over a relatively short distance and period of time. It involves the whole body working as one in order to produce maximum forward thrust through a series of sprinting strides which are taken as quickly as possible. It is used in many sports that incorporate running, typically as a way of rapidly reaching a target or goal, avoiding or catching an opponent, or intercepting a ball.

In athletics and track and field, sprints (or dashes) are races over short distances. They are among the oldest running competitions, being recorded at the Ancient Olympic Games. Three sprints are currently held at the modern Summer Olympics and outdoor World Championships: the 100 metres, 200 metres, and 400 metres.

At the professional level, sprinters begin the race by assuming a crouching position in the starting blocks before driving forward and gradually moving into an upright position as the race progresses and momentum is gained. The set position differs depending on the start. The use of starting blocks allows the sprinter to perform an enhanced isometric preload; this generates muscular pre-tension which is channeled into the subsequent forward drive, making it more powerful. Body alignment is of key importance in producing the optimal amount of force. Ideally, the athlete should begin in a 4-point stance and drive forwards concurrently pushing off using both legs for maximum force production. This initial forward thrust is asymmetric in nature usually meaning that the rear foot is lifted sooner while the front foot continues to push off from the front plate. As they come up from their low stance and their posture becomes increasingly upright they continue to thrust forwards in the direction of travel.

Athletes remain in the same lane on the running track throughout all sprinting events, with the sole exception of the 400 metres indoors. Races up to 100 metres are largely focused upon acceleration to an athlete's maximum speed. All sprints beyond this distance incorporate an element of endurance.

== History ==
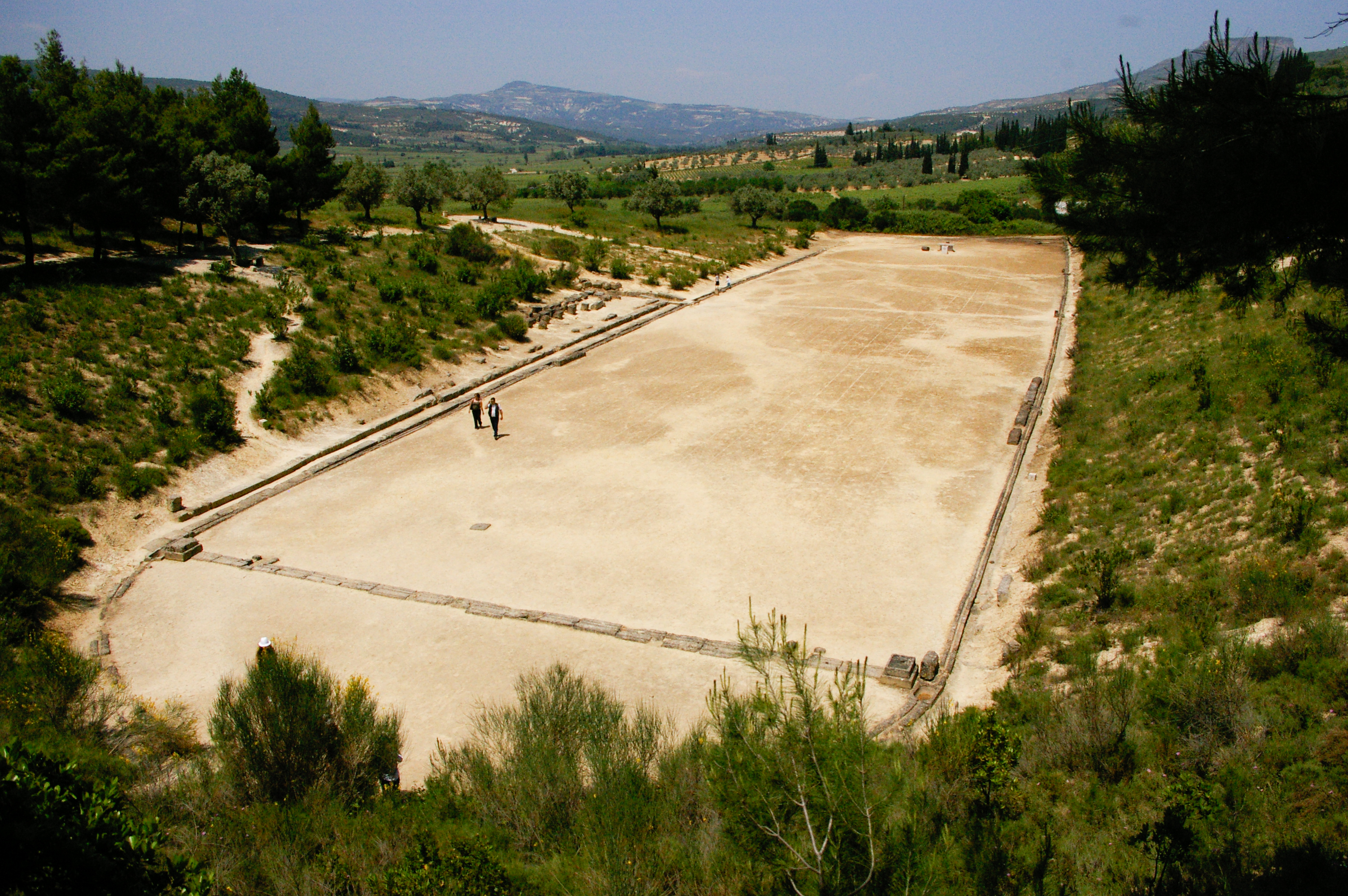
The stadion of ancient Nemea, Greece

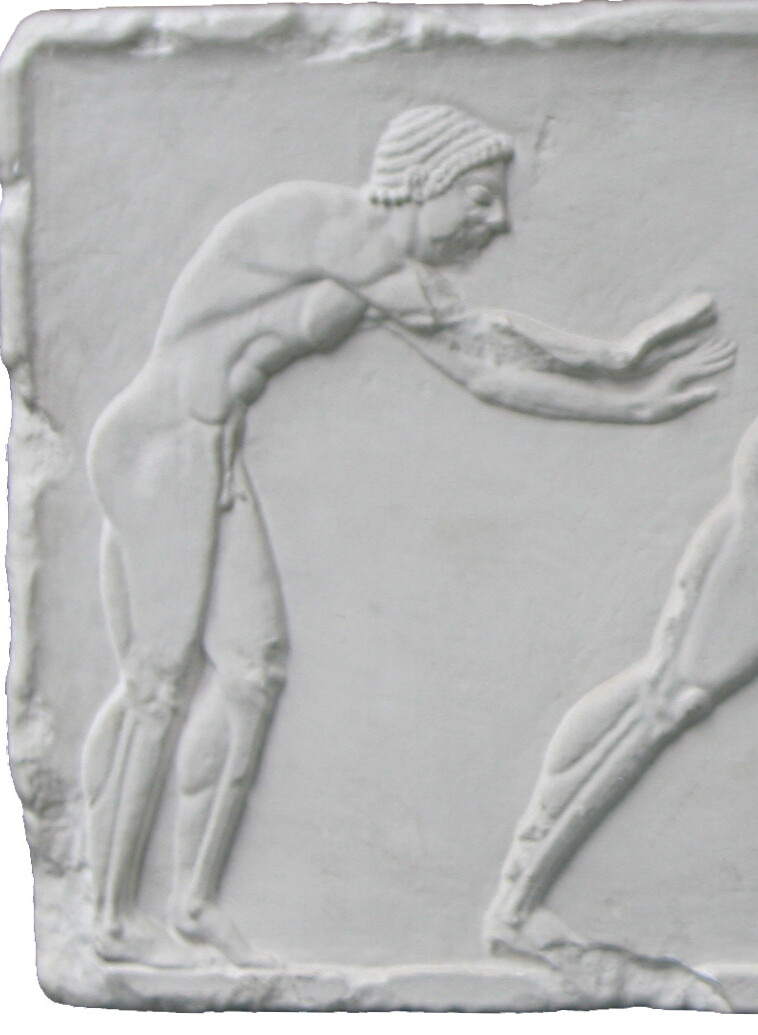
An Ancient Greek relief of a sprinter in the initial starting position. The next stage involved quickly crouching before exploding forward into the opening stride. Dated 500 BC and currently held in the Glyptothek, Munich.

The Ancient Olympic Games were begun in 776 BC. The first 13 editions featured only one event—the stadion race, which was a sprinting race from one end of the stadium to the other. The Diaulos (Δίαυλος, "double pipe") was a double-stadion race, c. 400 metres (1,300 feet), introduced in the 14th Olympiad of the ancient Olympic Games (724 BC).

Sprinting, and sprint training, in Ancient Greece emphasised the need to be as light-footed as possible while also ensuring that the foot was placed stably. The contemporary Hellenised, Syrian writer Lucian, in his treatise Anachasis, or Athletics, states that:

Furthermore, we train them to be good runners, habituating them to hold out for a long distance, and also making them light-footed for extreme speed in a short distance. And the running is not done on hard, resisting ground but in deep sand, where it is not easy to plant one's foot solidly or to get a purchase with it, since it slips from under one as the sand gives way beneath it. We also train them to jump a ditch, if need be, or any other obstacle, even carrying lead weights as large as they can grasp.

Training in heavy sand helped the sprinters to develop their technique. As the sand could move awkwardly when they placed their feet it meant that they were in danger of losing their sense of balance. Therefore they had to place their feet more lightly and carefully in order to avoid this happening. With continued practice this developed their ability to be as light-footed and as sure-footed as possible. Jump training, with and without weights, were methods used to develop the light-footedness and explosive power of sprinters and other athletes.

In the middle-ages sprint races were referred to as foot-races. They were a popular pastime and considered to be a worthy pursuit especially for males raised in military professions. Writing in 1801, the sports writer Joseph Strutt stated 'There is no other exercise that has more uniformly met the approbation of authors than running. In the middle-ages, foot-racing was considered as an essential part of a young man's education, especially if he was the son of a man of rank, and brought up in a military profession.'

In America in 1691, Sir Francis Nicholson hosted a Virginia athletic games which involved foot-races among its events. These races were partly based on a practice from Britain where aristocrats would race their footmen against each other for entertainment. As betting became more a part of the races, professional runners began to increasingly emerge.

Writing in 1838, the Hawaiian intellectual, David Malo, described foot-races which were part of traditional Hawaiian culture. The participants were called Kukini, meaning swift-runners, and they trained with task-specific physical training exercises and ate a specialised diet. Malo states 'The runner was first exercised in walking on his toes, without touching the heel of the foot to the ground. Then he was set to running, at first for a short distance at a moderate pace. Finally he was made to run at full speed for great distances. While in training they were denied poi and all soggy, heavy food, but were fed on rare-done flesh of the fowl and roasted vegetables, taro, sweet-potato, bread-fruit, etc.' The sprinters had to race from a starting point to a flag on a pole. Bets were placed on the runners by the spectators. These runners were also employed as messengers for civil and military matters.

The first modern Olympic Games started in the late 19th century (Athens 1896) and featured the 100 metres and 400 metres. Athletes started both races from a crouched start (4-point stance). In both the original Olympics and the modern Olympics, only men were allowed to participate in track and field until the 1928 games in Amsterdam, Netherlands. The 1928 games were also the first games to use a 400-metre track, which became the standard for track and field.

The modern sprinting events have their roots in races of imperial measurements which were later altered to metric: the 100 m evolved from the 100-yard dash, the 200 m distance came from the furlong (or 1/8 mile), and the 400 m was the successor to the 440-yard dash or quarter-mile race.

Technological advances have always improved sprint performances (i.e., starting blocks, synthetic track material, and shoe technology). In 1924, athletes used a small shovel to dig holes to start the race. The world record in the 100-metre dash in 1924 was 10.4 seconds, while in 1948, (the first use of starting blocks) was 10.2 seconds, and was 10.1 seconds in 1956. The constant drive for faster athletes with better technology has brought man from 10.4 seconds to 9.58 seconds in less than 100 years.

Track events were measured with the metric system except for the United Kingdom and the United States until 1965 and 1974 respectively. The Amateur Athletic Association (AAU) decided to switch track and field in the U.S. to the metric system to finally make track and field internationally equivalent.

== Biological factors for runners ==
Biological factors that determine a sprinter's potential include:

- Height (minor factor)
- Muscular strength
- Adrenaline use
- Anaerobic respiration capacity
- Breathing
- Footspeed
- Proportion of fast twitch muscles
- Leg length
- Pelvic width

== Competitions ==
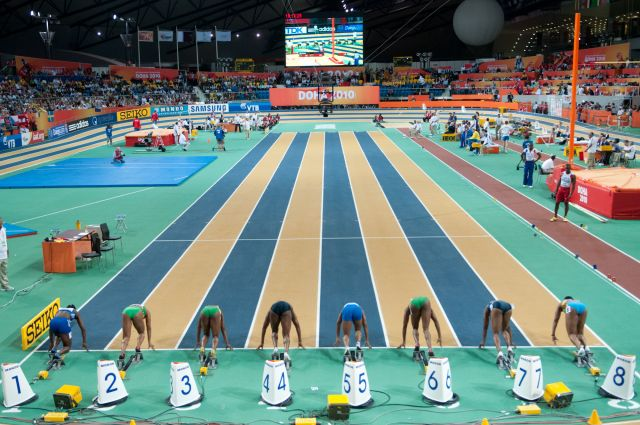
Start of the women's 60 m at the 2010 World Indoor Championships

=== Common contemporary distances ===
==== 60 metres ====
- Normally run indoors, on a straight section of an indoor athletic track.
- Some of the fastest humans reach their maximum speed around the 60-metre mark.
- 60-metres is often used as an outdoor distance by younger athletes when starting sprint racing.

Note: Indoor distances are less standardized, as many facilities run shorter or occasionally longer distances depending on available space. 60 m is the championship distance.

==== 100 metres ====
- Takes place on the straight of a standard outdoor 400 m track.
- Often, the world-record holder in this race is considered "the world's fastest man or woman."
- Primarily an outdoor race.

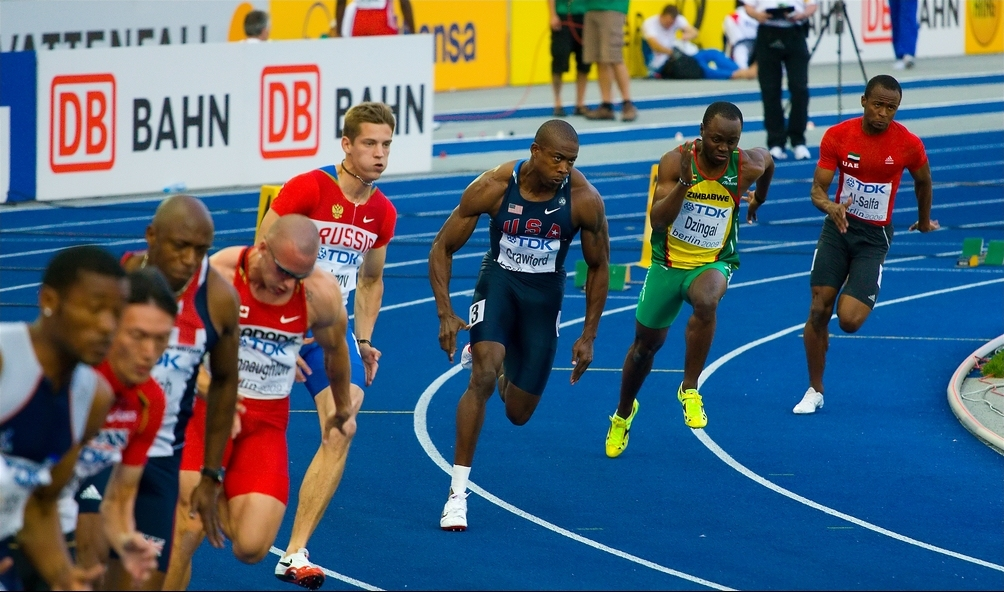
A 200 m bend

==== 200 metres ====
- Begins on the curve of a standard track (where the runners are staggered in their starting position, to ensure that they all run the same distance), and ends on the home straight.
- Competed both indoors and outdoors, with only slightly slower times than outdoors.

==== 400 metres ====
- Runners are staggered in their starting positions to ensure that everyone runs the same distance.
- Competed both indoors and outdoors, with only slightly slower times than outdoors.

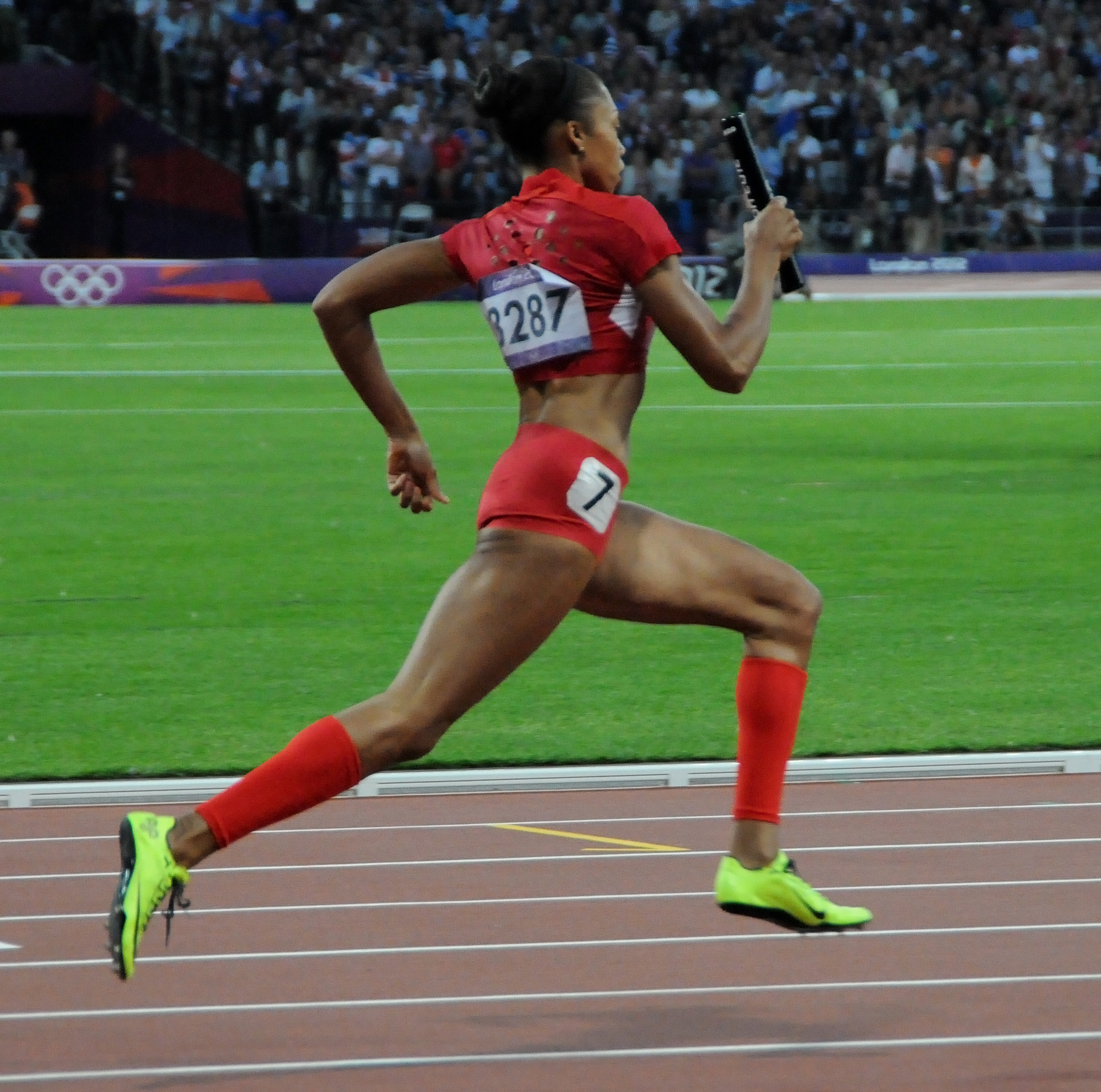
Allyson Felix, at London 2012 Summer Olympics

==== 4 × 100 metres relay ====
- Runners are staggered in their starting positions to ensure that everyone runs the same distance.
- Runners use exchange zones (and, previously, separate acceleration zones which have now been eliminated) to pass a baton

==== 4 × 400 metres relay ====
- Runners are staggered in their starting positions to ensure that everyone runs the same distance.
- Runners use exchange zones to pass a baton.
- Typically, the final race at track meets.

=== Historical and uncommon distances ===
==== 50 yards (45.72 m) ====
The event was a common event for most American students because it was one of the standardized test events as part of the President's Award on Physical Fitness.

==== 50 m ====
The 50 metres is an uncommon event and alternative to the 60 metres. Donovan Bailey holds the men's world record with a time of 5.56 seconds and Irina Privalova holds the women's world record with a time of 5.96 seconds.

==== 60 yards (54.864 m) ====
- A rarely run sprinting event that was once more commonplace. The world record time of 5.99 seconds is held by Lee McRae and was set in 1987. The time is often used for American football speed training.

==== 55 m ====
The 55 metres is an uncommon event that resulted from the metrication of the 60 yards and is an alternative to the 60 metres.

==== 70 yards (64.008 m) ====
An extremely rare sprinting event, that was occasionally run in the 1960s. The world record of 6.90 seconds is held by Bob Hayes.

==== 100 yards (91.44 m) ====
- The outdoor standard in the English (imperial measured) speaking world. It was part of the Commonwealth Games up until 1966 and was the premier event in American high school sprinting until the NFHS changed to metric in 1980, now only a secondary distance to the 100 metres.
- The unofficial World Record Holder is Jamaican Asafa Powell with a time of 9.07 seconds.

==== 150 m ====
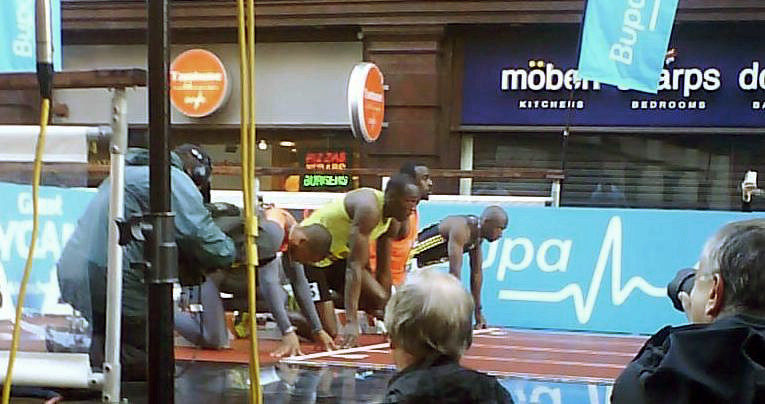
150 metres final at the Manchester City Games 2009

- The informal distance of 150 metres (164.042 yards) can be used to work on a 100 m runner's stamina, or a 200 m runner's speed, and has been used as an exhibition distance. The distance was used in a race between the 1996 Olympic champions, the 100 m gold medalist Donovan Bailey (Canada) and the 200 m gold medalist Michael Johnson (USA). It was to decide which of the two was really the 'fastest man on earth' (see Bailey–Johnson 150-metre race).
- The informal distance was used for an exhibition race during the Manchester Great CityGames as part of the 2009 Great Manchester Run (UK). Stars included Triple Olympic Champion Usain Bolt (Jamaica) alongside Ivory Williams (USA), Simeon Williamson (UK), and other international track stars. The female race included 400 m Olympic Champion, Christine Ohuruogu of Great Britain alongside Debbie Ferguson-McKenzie (Bahamas). Bolt ran the distance in a record time of 14.35 seconds.

==== Stadion ====
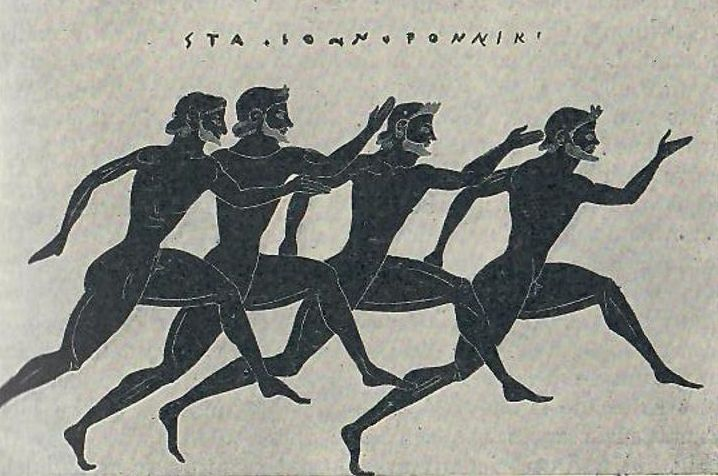
A race scene from Ancient Greece. This drawing is an early 20th Century copy of scene from an Ancient Greek Panathenaic amphora.

The stadion, also known as the stade, was the standard short distance sprint in ancient Greece and ran the length of a stadium. However, stadiums could vary in size and there was apparently no definite standard length for them, e.g., the stadium at Delphi measures 177 m and the one at Pergamon 210 m.

==== 300 m ====
- The 300 metres is another informal distance, which could be used to aid a 200 m runner's stamina, or a 400 m runner's speed. Currently, the world's best for this event is 30.69 seconds, set by Letsile Tebogo at altitude in Pretoria, South Africa in 2024. The women's record is 34.41 seconds, set by Shaunae Miller-Uibo in Ostrava, Czech Republic in 2019. Junior girls in several countries run this distance instead of the 400 metres.

==== Diaulos ====
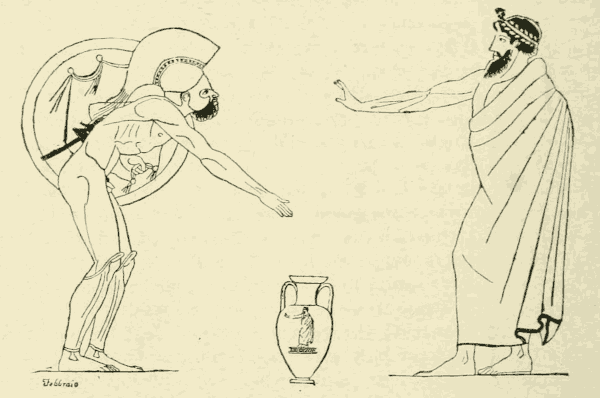
A hoplitodromos sprinter in the start position with a trainer. This artistic study of a panathenaic amphora was first published in 1910. From this position the runner will quickly crouch before taking his initial strides forward.

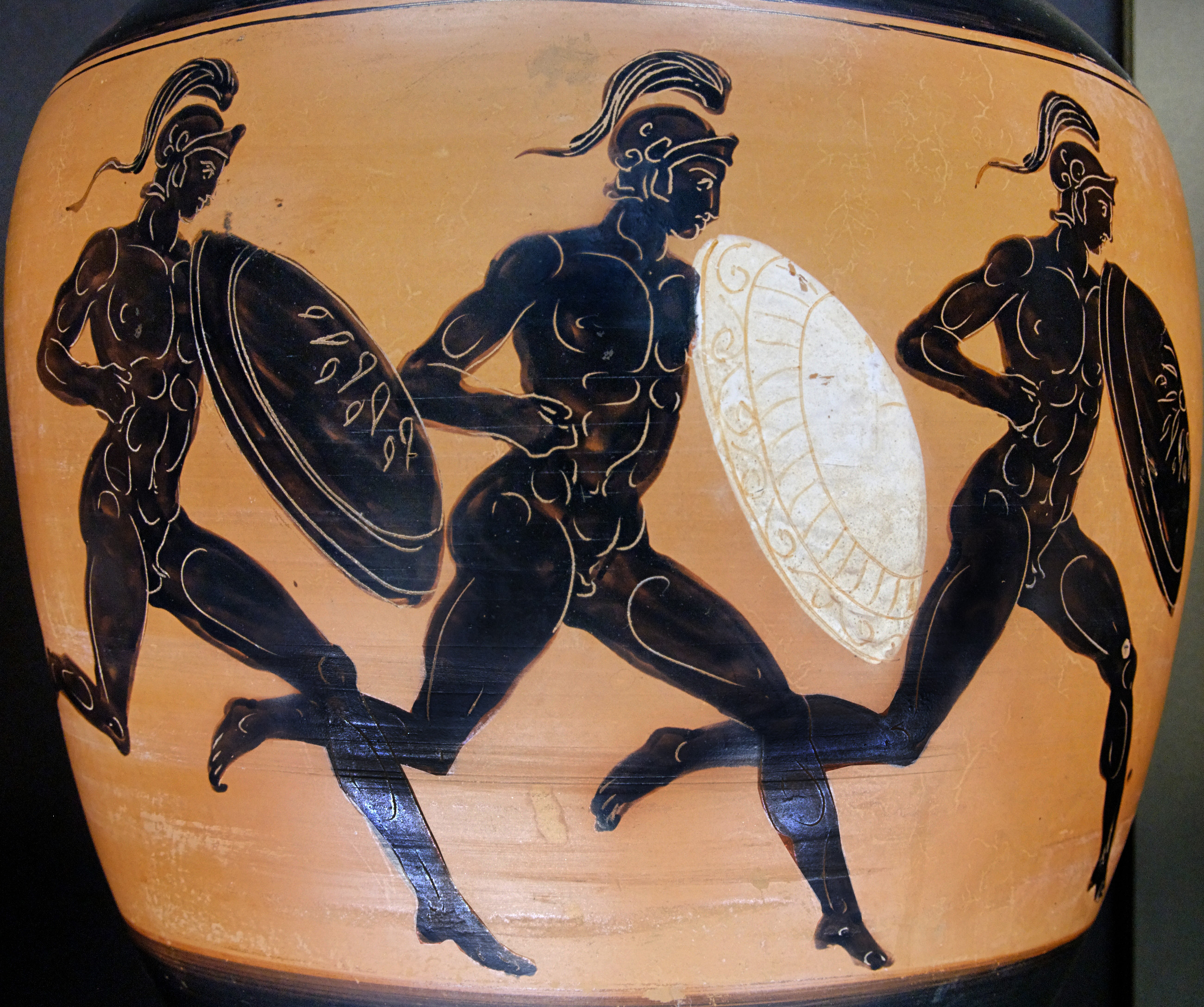
A hoplitodromos race in progress on a panathenaic amphora c. 323 BC. Louvre Museum.

The diaulos was an event contested in the Ancient Greek Olympia that was double the length of a stadion.

==== Hoplitodromos ====
As well as standard foot races, in Ancient Greece there was also a sprint race called the hoplitodromos ('armed diaulos'). This required the sprinters to additionally carry a large shield, wear greaves and a helmet. The wearing of greaves was discontinued around 450 BC. Similarly to the diaulos, they ran two stades in length i.e. one stade ending with a 180 degree turn around a post, which led onto the second stade in length back down the track. In the diaulos, each sprinter had an individual post to run around. However, for some hoplitodromos races all of the sprinters ran around a single central post. Due to the significant weight being carried, the length of the stance phase and the foot's contact time with the ground was increased. This allowed for a greater general recovery phase to be integrated, including of balance and energy, which was necessary due to the added stability and effort required to run with the bronze armament. In comparison to unweighted sprinting events, and their respective participants, the hoplitodromos favoured athletes with relatively longer bodies and shorter legs.

==== 4 × 200 metres relay ====
Runners are staggered in their starting positions to ensure that everyone runs the same distance. Runners use acceleration zones and exchange zones to pass a baton.

== Equipment ==
=== Shoes ===
Typically, a sprinter only needs two types of shoes, training shoes and sprinting spikes.

Sprinting spikes are typically designed to be lightweight, with a minimal cushion on the heels and a plate on the forefoot to keep the runner on the toes of each foot. The spike plate will typically have the maximum number of holes for metal spikes to be inserted to keep a proper grip on the track surface. These metal removable spikes also come in varying sizes. The spikes typically range from 4 mm to 15 mm and come in different styles. Most facilities have specific requirements for what size and style spikes can be used.

=== Starting blocks ===
Starting blocks are not a necessity but are highly suggested for use in sprinting events. Starting blocks are a piece of equipment that typically consists of foot pads attached to a central rail. The point of using blocks is to help the athlete push themselves further down the track as quickly as possible.

=== Baton ===
The baton is a required element for any relay race. The baton is passed to each athlete through different exchange zones, with different techniques. Typically, about 30 centimetres (1 ft) long and 3.8 centimetres (1.5 in) in diameter.

=== Timing ===
==== Stopwatches ====
Used typically in training sessions to measure relative times and recovery times. Stopwatches are not always the most accurate way to measure times in a race setting,

==== Fully Automatic Timing / gate systems ====
Fully Automatic Timing (FAT) and gate systems are used to accurately measure races, with results as accurate as up to 1/1000 of a second.

== Governing bodies ==
As of 2021, World Athletics (WA) is the governing body for track and field around the world. Every country that wishes to participate in WA competitions must become a member.

== Rules ==
=== Rule differences between governing bodies ===
Each governing body sets its own rules for how competition is deemed fair. World Athletics sets the competition rules internationally. The World Athletics rulebook is broken into 4 separate books.

=== The start ===
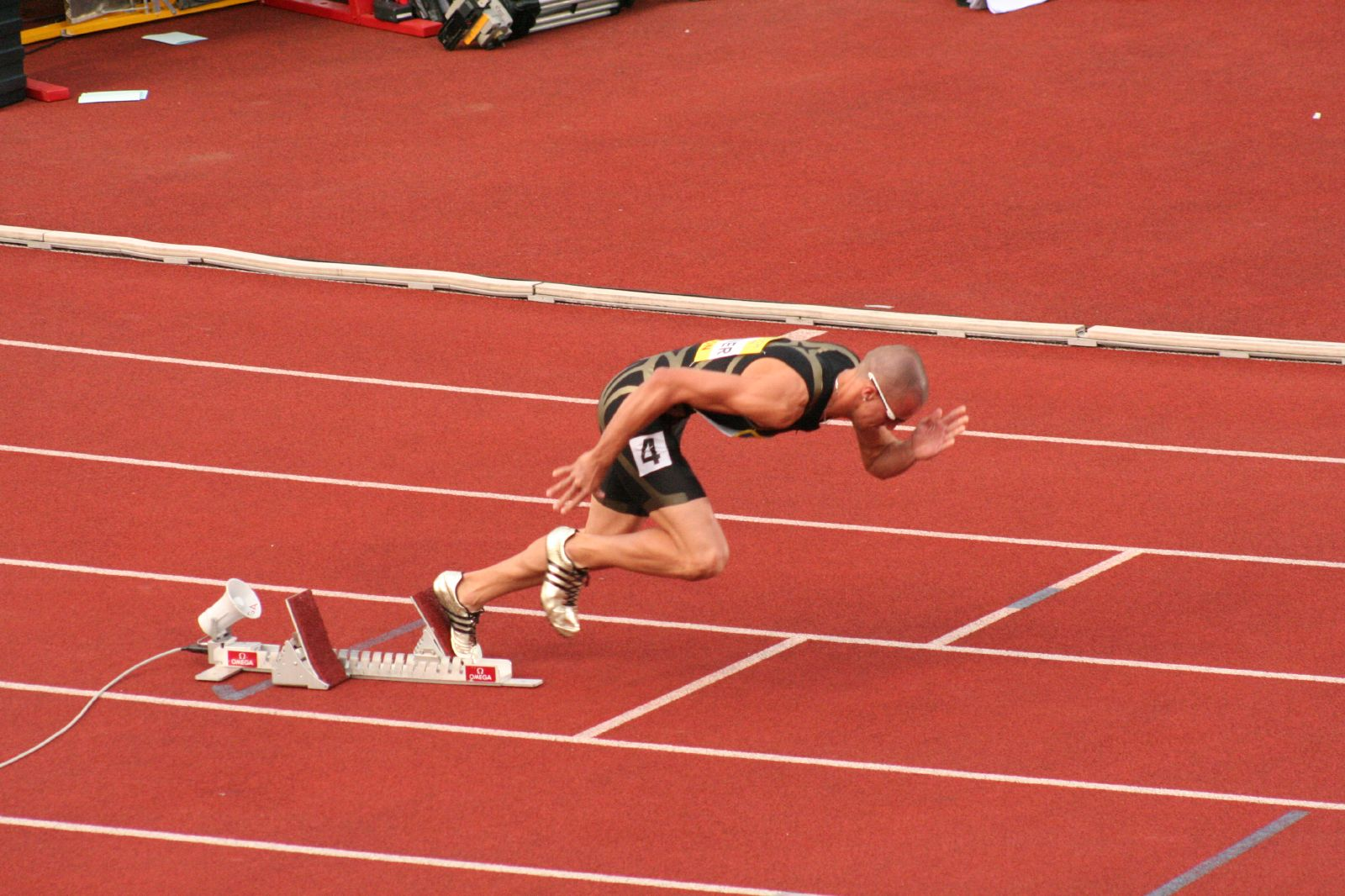
Jeremy Wariner beginning a race from the starting blocks

Starting blocks are used for all competition sprints (up to and including 400 m) and relay events (first leg only, up to 4x400 m). The starting blocks consist of two adjustable footplates attached to a rigid frame. Races commence with the firing of the starter's gun. The starting commands are "On your marks" and "Set". Once all athletes are in the set position, the starter's gun is fired, officially starting the race. For the 100 m, all competitors are lined up side by side. For the 200 m, 300 m, and 400 m, which involve curves, runners are staggered for the start.

In the rare event that there are technical issues with a start, a green card is shown to all the athletes. The green card carries no penalty. If an athlete is unhappy with track conditions after the "on your marks" command is given, the athlete must raise a hand before the "set" command and provide the Start referee with a reason. It is then up to the Start referee to decide if the reason is valid. If the Start referee deems the reason invalid, a yellow card (warning) is issued to that particular athlete. If the athlete is already on a warning, the athlete is disqualified.

=== False starts ===
According to the World Athletics (WA) rules, "An athlete, after assuming a full and final set position, shall not commence his starting motion until after receiving the report of the gun or approved starting apparatus. If, in the judgement of the Starter or Recallers, he does so any earlier, it shall be deemed a false start."

The 100 m Olympic gold and silver medallist Linford Christie of Great Britain famously had frequent false starts that were marginally below the legal reaction time of 0.1 seconds. Christie and his coach, Ron Roddan, both claimed that the false starts were due to Christie's exceptional reaction times being under legal time. His frequent false starting eventually led to his disqualification from the 1996 Summer Olympics 100 m final in Atlanta, the US, due to a second false start by Christie. Since January 2010, under WA rules, a single false start by an athlete resulted in disqualification.

In 2012, a new development to the false start rule was added. Because certain athletes could be disqualified for twitching in the starting blocks, but some athletes could make a twitch without the starter noticing and disqualifying the athlete, it was decided that twitching in the starting block while being in the 'set' position would only carry a maximum penalty of a yellow card or a warning. To instantly be disqualified for a false start, an athlete's hands must leave the track or their feet must leave the starting blocks, while the athlete is in their final 'set' position.

=== Lanes ===
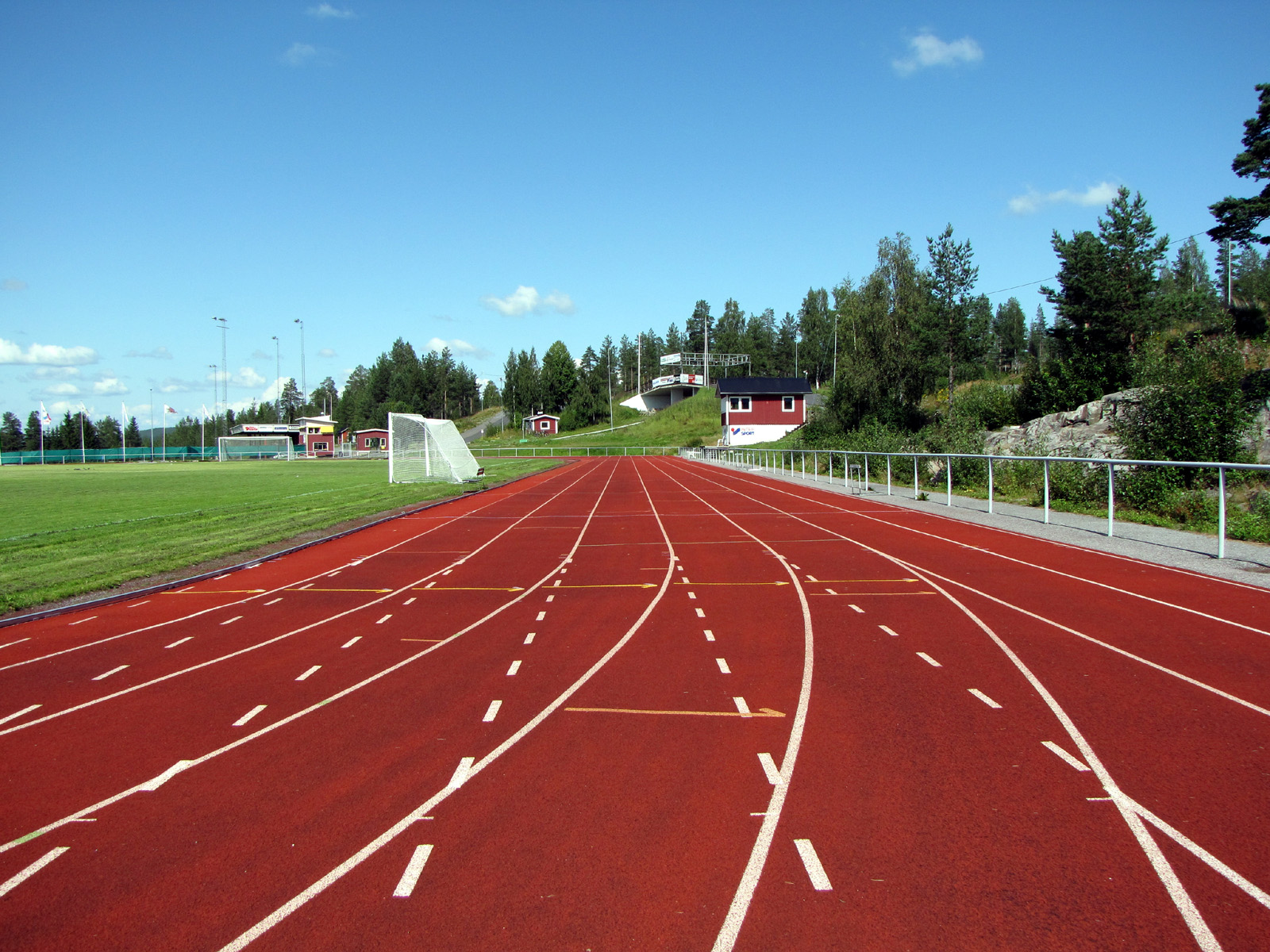
Sprint lanes in Örnsköldsvik, Sweden, as seen from the 100 m starting point

For all Olympic sprint events, runners must remain within their pre-assigned lanes, which measure 1.22 metres (4 feet) wide, from start to finish. The lanes can be numbered 1 through 8, 9, or rarely 10, starting with the inside lane. Any athlete who runs outside the assigned lane to gain an advantage is subject to disqualification. If the athlete is forced to run outside of their lane by another person, and no material advantage is gained, there will be no disqualification. Also, a runner who strays from their lane in the straightaway, or crosses the outer line of their lane on the bend, and gains no advantage by it, will not be disqualified as long as no other runner is obstructed.

=== The finish ===
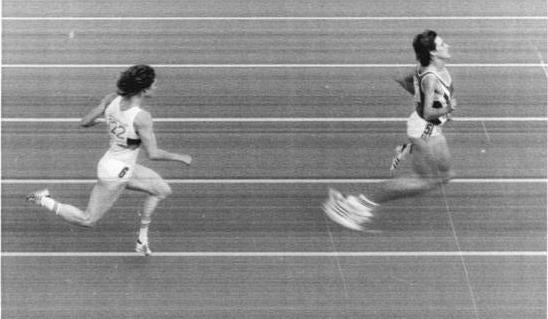
The finish of the 1987 East German athletics championships

The first athlete whose torso reaches the vertical plane of the closest edge of the finish line is the winner. To ensure that the sprinter's torso triggers the timing impulse at the finish line rather than an arm, foot, or other body parts, a double Photocell is commonly used. Times are only recorded by an electronic timing system when both of these Photocells are simultaneously blocked. Photo finish systems are also used at some track and field events.

== World records ==
Women's World Records
Discipline	Performance	Competitor	Country	Venue	Date
50 metres	5.96	Irina Privalova	RUS	Madrid (ESP)	9 February 1995
60 metres	6.92	Irina Privalova	RUS	Madrid (ESP)	9 February 1995
100 metres	10.49	Florence Griffith-Joyner	USA	Indianapolis, Indiana (USA)	16 July 1988
200 metres (indoors)	21.87	Merlene Ottey	JAM	Lievin (FRA)	13 February 1993
200 metres (outdoors)	21.34	Florence Griffith-Joyner	USA	Olympic Stadium, Jamsil, Seoul (KOR)	29 September 1988
400 metres (indoors)	49.26	Femke Bol	NLD	Omnisport, Apeldoorn (NLD)	19 February 2023
400 metres (outdoors)	47.60	Marita Koch	GDR	Bruce Stadium, Canberra (AUS)	6 October 1985
4x100 metre relay	40.82	Tianna Bartoletta, Allyson Felix, Bianca Knight, Carmelita Jeter	USA	Olympic Stadium, London (GBR)	10 August 2012
4x200 metre relay (indoors)	1:32.41	Yuliya Gushchina, Yuliya Pechonkina, Irina Khabarova, Yekaterina Kondratyeva	RUS	Glasgow (GBR)	29 January 2005
4x200 metre relay (outdoors)	1:27.46	Marion Jones, Nanceen Perry, LaTasha Colander, LaTasha Jenkins	USA	Philadelphia, PA (USA)	29 April 2000
4x400 metre relay (indoors)	3:23.37	Yuliya Gushchina, Olga Kotlyarova, Olga Zaytseva, Olesya Krasnomovets-Forsheva	RUS	Glasgow (GBR)	28 January 2006
4x400 metre relay (outdoors)	3:15.17	Tatyana Ledovskaya, Olga Nazarova, Mariya Pinigina, Olga Bryzgina	URS	Olympic Stadium, Jamsil, Seoul (KOR)	1 October 1988

Men's World Records
Discipline	Performance	Competitor	Country	Venue	Date
50 metres	5.56	Donovan Bailey	CAN	Reno, Nevada (USA)	9 February 1996
60 metres	6.34	Christian Coleman	USA	Albuquerque, New Mexico (USA)	18 February 2018
100 metres	9.58	Usain Bolt	JAM	Olympiastadion, Berlin (GER)	16 August 2009
200 metres (indoors)	19.92	Frank Fredericks	NAM	Liévin (FRA)	18 February 1996
200 metres (outdoors)	19.19	Usain Bolt	JAM	Olympiastadion, Berlin (GER)	20 August 2009
400 metres (indoors)	44.57	Kerron Clement	USA	Fayetteville, Arkansas (USA)	12 March 2005
400 metres (outdoors)	43.03	Wayde Van Niekerk	RSA	Estádio Olímpico, Rio de Janeiro (BRA)	14 August 2016
4x100 metre relay	36.84	Nesta Carter, Michael Frater, Yohan Blake, Usain Bolt	JAM	Olympic Stadium, London (GBR)	11 August 2012
4x200 metre relay (indoors)	1:22.11	John Regis, Ade Mafe, Darren Braithwaite, Linford Christie	GBR	Glasgow (GBR)	3 March 1991
4x200 metre relay (outdoors)	1:18.63	Nickel Ashmeade, Warren Weir, Jermaine Brown, Yohan Blake	JAM	T. Robinson Stadium, Nassau (BAH)	24 May 2014
4x400 metre relay (indoors)	3:01.51	Amere Lattin, Obi Igbokwe, Jermaine Holt, Kahmari Montgomery	USA	Clemson, South Carolina (USA)	9 February 2019
4x400 metre relay (outdoors)	2:54.29	Michael Johnson, Harry "Butch" Reynolds, Quincy Watts, Andrew Valmon	USA	Gottlieb-Daimler Stadion, Stuttgart (GER)	22 August 1993

Mixed World Records
Discipline	Performance	Competitor	Country	Venue	Date
4x400 metre relay mixed	3:08.80	Justin Robinson, Rosey Effiong, Matthew Boling, Alexis Holmes	USA	National Athletics Centre, Budapest (HUN)	19 August 2023

== Worldwide events involving sprint races ==
- African Games
- Asian Games
- European Athletics Championship
- The Olympic Games
- Wanda Diamond League
- World Athletics Relays
- Youth Olympic Games

== Sprint training ==
While genetics play a large role in one's ability to sprint, athletes must be dedicated to their training to ensure that they can optimize their performances. Sprint training includes various running workouts, targeting acceleration, speed development, speed endurance, special endurance, and tempo endurance. Additionally, athletes perform intense strength training workouts, as well as plyometric or jumping workouts. Collectively, these training methods produce qualities that allow athletes to be stronger, and more powerful, in hopes of ultimately running faster.

=== Strength and balance ===
In is important for sprinters that their muscular system is in the optimum ratio in order to maximise their chances of success. As such, in their training they seek to avoid excessive muscle imbalances developing especially in regard to a lateral imbalance between the left and right sides of their body. For example, the strength of their left and right legs should be approximately even and neither leg should be excessively stronger than the other. If there is an excessive lateral imbalance, with one side of the body much stronger than the other, then it can result in negative physical stresses, overuse injuries and poor sprinting form. Methods to avoid this are therefore incorporated into sprint training.

During the 200m and 400m sprints athletes run counter-clockwise around curved sections of the track. This is known as running the bend or curvilinear running. When sprinters run around these curved sections of track, their gait becomes asynchronous meaning that their left stride is shorter and their right stride longer. In order to avoid their leg muscles developing in a lop sided fashion they also run clockwise around the track during training. This means that, overall, they are using their left and right legs in a more even manner and therefore their strength develops in more of a balanced way.

Similarly, launching from starting blocks is an asynchronous action. The foot on the front pedal drives for longer and applies significantly more force overall in this phase. In order to avoid a strength imbalance developing between the leg used on the front pedal and the one used on the rear pedal, the athlete alternates the foot they use for each pedal i.e. uses the left foot in the front pedal some of the time and the right foot in the front pedal at other times. Such a training practice results in a more even muscular development, improves overall efficiency and reduces the risk of injury. In races, sprinters use their strongest set up and put their preferred foot in the front pedal.

Alternating asynchronous actions is a standard method used by athletes to ensure they achieve the optimum muscular development for their discipline and ensure higher levels of success.

=== Balance, recovery and explosive power ===
A good sense of balance is of fundamental importance to an efficient sprinting technique. Sprinting involves dynamic balance which relates to how a person balances during movement. A better sense of balance allows for more efficient shock absorption and stabilisation of the foot during footstrike meaning a secure base of support can be achieved more quickly. It also allows for a faster and more efficient general stabilisation during the subsequent midstance phase. This additionally means that the person can recover energy more rapidly during this phase. The stronger base of support, increased general level of stability and faster recovery of energy, which are made possible by a good sense of balance, mean that the subsequent propulsive phase i.e. the main stride, can be performed more explosively. For these reasons, balance exercises are typically included in comprehensive sprint training programmes. Their benefits may transfer more effectively to sprint technique if their range of movement is similar to that found in sprinting. Examples include single leg depth jumps and step ups with dumbbells.

== See also ==
- Sprint cycling
- Athletics at the Summer Olympics
  - 60 metres at the Olympics
  - 100 metres at the Olympics
  - 200 metres at the Olympics
  - 400 metres at the Olympics
  - Sprint hurdles at the Olympics
  - 400 metres hurdles at the Olympics
  - 4×100 metres relay at the Olympics
  - 4×400 metres relay at the Olympics
