= 100 metres at the Olympics =

100 meters at the Olympic Games
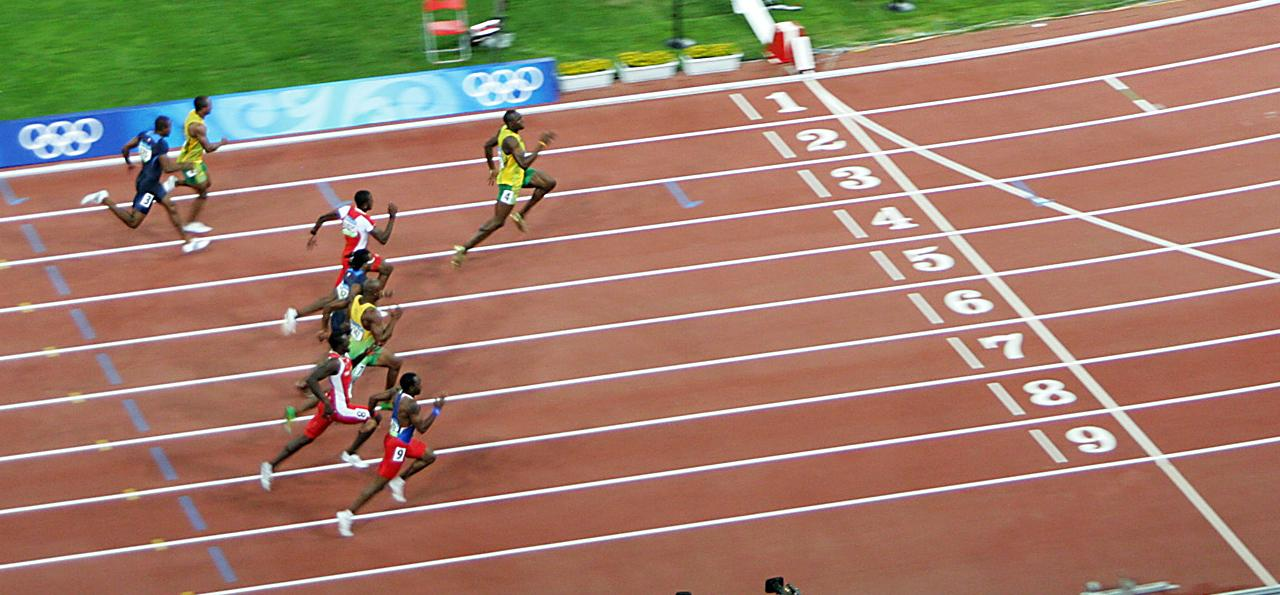
- The 2008 Olympic men's 100 metre final

Overview
- Sport: Athletics
- Gender: Men and women
- Years held: Men: 1896–2024; Women: 1928–2024

Olympic record
- Men: Usain Bolt (JAM) 9.63 (2012)
- Women: Elaine Thompson-Herah (JAM) 10.61 (2021)

Reigning champion
- Men: Noah Lyles (USA)
- Women: Julien Alfred (LCA)

The 100 metres at the Summer Olympics has been contested since the first edition of the multi-sport event. The men's 100 metres has been present on the Olympic athletics programme since 1896. The 100 metres is considered one of the blue ribbon events of the Olympics and is among the highest profile competitions at the games. It is the most prestigious 100 metres race at an elite level and is the shortest sprinting competition at the Olympics – a position it has held at every edition except for a brief period between 1900 and 1904, when a men's 60 metres was contested.

The first Olympic champions were Thomas Burke in the men's category and, 32 years later, Betty Robinson in the women's category. The Olympic records for the event are 9.63 seconds, set by Usain Bolt in 2012, and 10.61 seconds, set by Elaine Thompson-Herah in 2021. The world records for the event have been equalled or broken during the Olympics on seven occasions in the men's category and on twelve occasions in the women's.

Among the competing nations, the United States has had the most success in this event, having won sixteen golds in the men's race and nine in the women's race. Usain Bolt of Jamaica has won three consecutive titles (2008–16). Five other athletes have won back-to-back titles: Wyomia Tyus (1964–68), Carl Lewis (1984–88), Gail Devers (1992–96), Shelly-Ann Fraser-Pryce (2008–12), and Elaine Thompson-Herah (2016–20). Merlene Ottey is the only athlete to win three medals without winning gold, with one silver and two bronze medals. Shelly-Ann Fraser-Pryce is the most decorated athlete in the event, male or female, having won 4 medals.

Many athletes that compete in this event also compete individually in the Olympic 200 metres and with their national teams in the Olympic 4×100 metres relay, with Jamaicans Usain Bolt and Elaine Thompson-Herah being the only athletes to do so more than once. Nine men have achieved the 100 metres and 200 metres 'Double' at the same Olympic Games—Archie Hahn (1904), Ralph Craig (1912), Percy Williams (1928), Eddie Tolan (1932), Jesse Owens (1936), Bobby Morrow (1956), Valeriy Borzov (1972), Carl Lewis (1984), and Usain Bolt (2008, 2012, 2016). Four of these men were also members of the winning team in the 4 × 100 meters relay at the same games—Jesse Owens (1936), Bobby Morrow (1956), Carl Lewis (1984), and Usain Bolt (2012, 2016). Three of these men have won a fourth gold medal at the same games—Archie Hahn in the now-defunct 60 metres, and both Jesse Owens and Carl Lewis in the long jump.

Seven women have achieved the 100 metres and 200 metres 'Double' at the same Olympic Games—Fanny Blankers-Koen (1948), Marjorie Jackson (1952), Betty Cuthbert (1956), Wilma Rudolph (1960), Renate Stecher (1972), Florence Griffith Joyner (1988), and Elaine Thompson-Herah (2016 and 2021). Five of these women were also members of the winning team in the 4 × 100 meters relay at the same games—Fanny Blankers-Koen (1948), Betty Cuthbert (1956), Wilma Rudolph (1960), Florence Griffith Joyner (1988) and Elaine Thompson-Herah (2021). Fanny Blankers-Koen is the only one of these women to win four gold medals at the same games by winning the 80 metres hurdles in 1948.

== Competition format ==
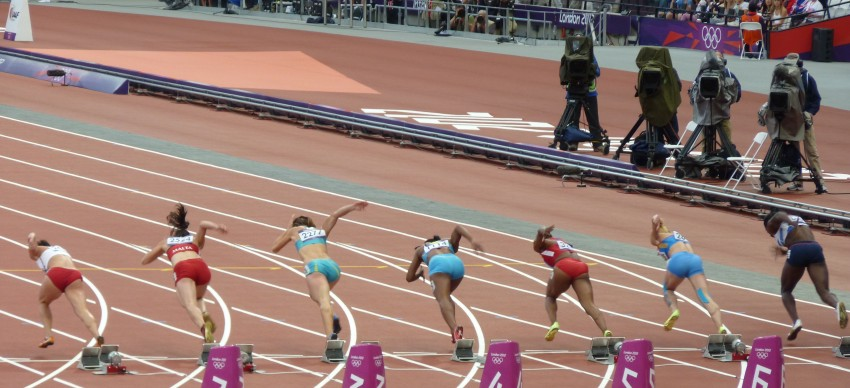
Women competing in the first round of the 2012 Summer Olympics

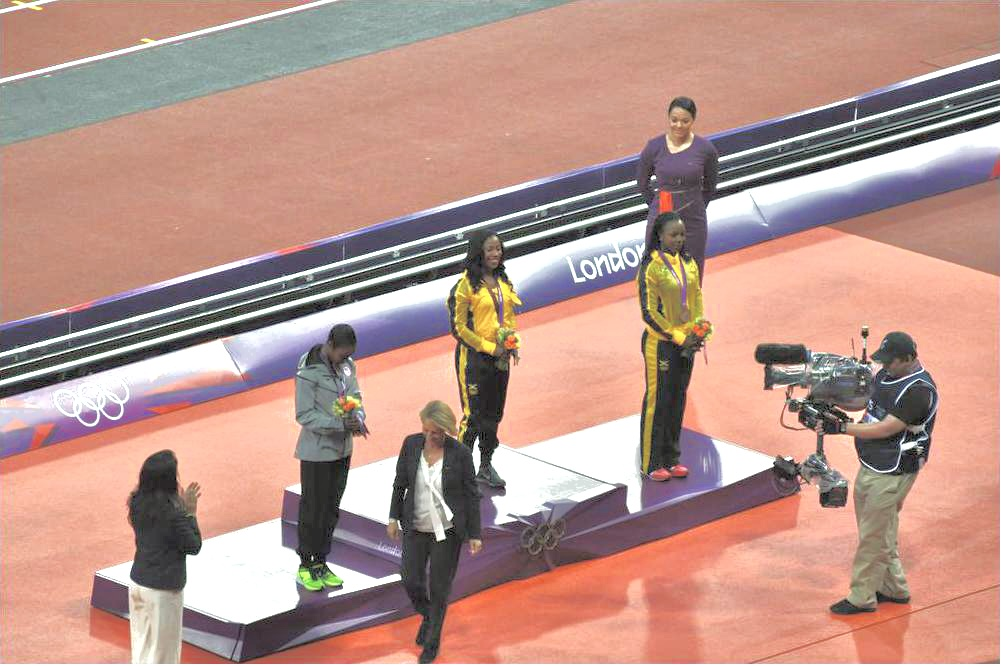
The women's 100-metre medalists at the 2012 Summer Olympics

The Olympic 100 metres competitions are carried out under standard international rules, as set by the International Association of Athletics Federations (IAAF). The races are segregated by gender, with one for men and one for women. The 100 m is usually held at the beginning of the Olympic athletics programme as this allows athletes to compete in other events held later at the games – many 100 m athletes also compete in the 200 metres and the 4×100 metres relay events.

Traditionally there are four rounds of competition: heats, quarter-finals, semi-finals, and finals. Prior to 1964, finals featured six athletes. For all Olympic competitions from 1964 onwards—allowing for a sufficient number of athletes being present—each race features eight runners. Athletes are seeded by past performance to ensure an even balance of quality across the heats and allow the best runners to progress to the later stages. Usually in the first two rounds the top three runners progress to the next stage. A small number of other athletes also progress as the fastest non-qualifiers (or "fastest losers") through a repechage system. Prior to 2012, the semi-finals stage comprised two races of eight athletes and the top four finishers in each race (regardless of time) were entered into the final.

Several amendments were made to the competition format in 2012. Any participant not in possession of an Olympic qualifying standard time is entered into the preliminary round. Qualifiers in this round progress to the first round proper. The semi-finals stage is divided into three races: the top two progress to the final by right and the two fastest non-qualifiers complete the eight finalists. Changes to the international false start rules were also introduced – any validly recorded reaction time to the starter's pistol of below 0.1 seconds will result in instant disqualification. At the 2004 and 2008 Olympics one false start was allowed per race, with any subsequent false start resulting in disqualification for the offending athletes. At Olympics prior to 2004 each athlete was allowed one false start, with a second false start leading to removal from the field.

The top three finishers in the final are awarded a gold, silver, and bronze medal, respectively. If runners cannot be separated by their time (recorded to one hundredth of a second) further analysis is used to distinguish their times to the thousandth of a second. In the 2008 Women's 100 m final the minor medallists Sherone Simpson and Kerron Stewart could not be separated by this method and were both awarded the silver medal. Medal positions in a 100 m race have only been shared on one other occasion in Olympic history: Alajos Szokolyi and Francis Lane were joint third at the 1896 men's final.

== Participation ==
Starting with 15 men from eight nations at the inaugural 1896 Olympic 100 m, participation in the event reached its peak at the 2000 Sydney Games, where 179 male and female athletes from 100 nations were present. The number of competitors and nations in the event has seen an increasing historical trend. This increase has been mostly linear, though participation was affected by the Olympic boycotts of 1976, 1980 and 1984. The linear trend stopped after the 2000 peak and has steadily decreased in subsequent Summer Olympics.

Qualifying standards
Year	Men "A"	Men "B"	Women "A"	Women "B"
2000	10.27	10.40	11.40	11.60
2004	10.21	10.28	11.30	11.40
2008	10.21	10.28	11.32	11.42
2012	10.18	10.24	11.29	11.38
2016	10.16	—N/a	11.32	—N/a
2020/2021	10.05	—N/a	11.12	—N/a

Men's participation reached its highest at the 1996 Atlanta Olympics, which featured 104 men from 75 nations. Women's participation began in 1928, with 31 women from 13 nations competing, and reached an all-time high at the 2008 Beijing Games, which had 85 women representing 69 nations. The 2008 and 2012 editions reversed the historical gender bias towards male participation, as women outnumbered men at the Olympic 100 m for the first time.

As the governing body for the sport of athletics, the International Association of Athletics Federations (IAAF) applies qualifying standards to the competition. This aims to encourage high level performances at the Olympic Games and contain the number of potential entries (the IAAF aims to cap Olympic participation in athletics events at 2000 athletes). There are two types of qualifying standard: the "A" standard and the "B" standard. Each National Olympic Committee (NOC) may enter up to three athletes who have obtained the "A" standard, or one athlete with the "B" standard. If a NOC has no qualifying athletes in any Olympic athletic event, it may enter one non-qualified athlete – the 100 m is a frequent choice for this type of entry given the brevity of the event. Athletes must achieve the qualifying time without wind-assistance at an officially authorised event within a certain time period, which typically begins from the year prior to the Olympics and extends up to three weeks before the games. The IAAF prohibits entrants who do not reach the age of sixteen in that Olympic year, but there is no upper age limit. The IAAF qualifying standards for the 100 m have become progressively more stringent since 2000.

On top of IAAF standards, national governing bodies may apply their own participation restrictions. These principally come in four forms: stricter national qualifying times, reduced time periods for qualifying performances, performances in the event at a national Olympic trials, and decisions of national selection committees. Smaller nations do not typically apply these additional criteria due to the smaller numbers of sprinters eligible to compete. Larger nations, and nations with strong traditions in sprinting, often have long-running histories of Olympic 100 m trials (such as at the United States Olympic Trials). Participation for a country also demands that the athlete hold respective citizenship and is not subject to a competitive ban through anti-doping rules.

World Athletics in 2019 announced that, following the inauguration of their World Rankings platform, that in addition to those who achieved the Olympic standard, placing in the top 32 of the rankings will serve as a qualification method for athletes. (For example, if someone comes 3rd in the 100 m finals of their national championships in 10.14, if he is 22nd in the World Rankings, he has qualified for the games).

Year	No. of men	Nations (men)	No. of women	Nations (women)	Total athletes	Total nations	Men's champion	Women's champion
1896	15	8	—N/a	—N/a	15	8	Thomas Burke (USA)	—N/a
1900	20	9	—N/a	—N/a	20	9	Frank Jarvis (USA)	—N/a
1904	11	3	—N/a	—N/a	11	3	Archie Hahn (USA)	—N/a
1908	60	16	—N/a	—N/a	60	16	Reggie Walker (RSA)	—N/a
1912	70	22	—N/a	—N/a	70	22	Ralph Craig (USA)	—N/a
1920	61	23	—N/a	—N/a	61	23	Charlie Paddock (USA)	—N/a
1924	86	34	—N/a	—N/a	86	34	Harold Abrahams (GBR)	—N/a
1928	81	33	31	13	107	35	Percy Williams (CAN)	Betty Robinson (USA)
1932	33	17	20	10	51	19	Eddie Tolan (USA)	Stanisława Walasiewicz (POL)
1936	61	30	30	15	91	33	Jesse Owens (USA)	Helen Stephens (USA)
1948	61	33	38	21	99	39	Harrison Dillard (USA)	Fanny Blankers-Koen (NED)
1952	70	33	56	27	126	41	Lindy Remigino (USA)	Marjorie Jackson (AUS)
1956	63	31	34	16	97	34	Bobby Morrow (USA)	Betty Cuthbert (AUS)
1960	59	45	31	18	90	50	Armin Hary (EUA)	Wilma Rudolph (USA)
1964	71	49	44	27	115	56	Bob Hayes (USA)	Wyomia Tyus (USA)
1968	63	42	42	22	105	48	Jim Hines (USA)	Wyomia Tyus (USA)
1972	83	55	47	33	130	68	Valeriy Borzov (URS)	Renate Stecher (GDR)
1976	61	40	39	22	100	45	Hasely Crawford (TRI)	Annegret Richter (FRG)
1980	63	41	40	25	103	46	Allan Wells (GBR)	Lyudmila Kondratyeva (URS)
1984	80	59	46	33	126	68	Carl Lewis (USA)	Evelyn Ashford (USA)
1988	100	69	64	42	164	85	Carl Lewis (USA)	Florence Griffith Joyner (USA)
1992	79	66	54	41	133	86	Linford Christie (GBR)	Gail Devers (USA)
1996	104	75	56	38	160	89	Donovan Bailey (CAN)	Gail Devers (USA)
2000	95	71	84	63	179	100	Maurice Greene (USA)	Vacated
2004	80	62	63	51	143	89	Justin Gatlin (USA)	Yulia Nestsiarenka (BLR)
2008	78	64	85	69	163	96	Usain Bolt (JAM)	Shelly-Ann Fraser (JAM)
2012	72	61	79	65	151	92	Usain Bolt (JAM)	Shelly-Ann Fraser-Pryce (JAM)
2016	84	57	80	56	164	82	Usain Bolt (JAM)	Elaine Thompson (JAM)
2020							Marcell Jacobs (ITA)	Elaine Thompson-Herah (JAM)
2024							Noah Lyles (USA)	Julien Alfred (LCA)

Data notes

- Numbers do not include non-starting athletes. There have been two Olympic 100 m non-starters: Estonia's Reinhold Saulmann in 1920, and Kim Collins in 2012 – the latter was banned from competing by the St. Kitts and Nevis Olympic Committee for defying their orders and leaving the Olympic camp to stay with his wife.
- Nations are above defined as the competing Olympic team as opposed to athletes' legal nationalities – the various Unified teams and Independent Olympian teams are thus each treated as one nation at that Olympic Games.

== Biological factors ==
=== Age ===
The 100 m requires a high level of athleticism and as a result most of the participants in the Olympics are aged between 18 and 35 – which is roughly contiguous with the period of peak physical fitness in humans. Consequently, the vast majority of participants in the Olympic 100 m fall within this age range. As of 2020, the qualification rules prohibit athletes younger than 16 at the end of the year of the Games.

The record for the youngest athlete to participate in the Olympic 100 m is held by Katura Marae, who was 14 when she represented Vanuatu at the 2004 Athens Olympics. Merlene Ottey holds the records for both the oldest participant and the oldest medallist, having won bronze at age 40 in 2000 and reached the Olympic semi-finals four years later. (Ottey is also the most frequent participant having competed in the Olympic 100 m an unrivalled six times from 1984 to 2004). The first women's champion, Betty Robinson in 1928, remains the youngest gold medallist for the event at 16 years old, while a 32-year-old Linford Christie became the oldest 100 m Olympic champion in 1992.

Distinction	Male athlete	Age	Female athlete	Age
Youngest champion	Reggie Walker	19 years, 4 months, 6 days	Betty Robinson	16 years, 11 months, 8 days
Youngest medallist	Donald Lippincott	18 years, 7 months, 21 days	Betty Robinson	16 years, 11 months, 8 days
Youngest participant	Alphonse Yanghat	15 years, 3 months, 27 days	Katura Marae	14 years, 8 months, 17 days
Oldest champion	Linford Christie	32 years, 3 months, 30 days	Fanny Blankers-Koen	30 years, 3 months, 7 days
Oldest medallist	Linford Christie	32 years, 3 months, 30 days	Merlene Ottey	40 years, 4 months, 14 days
Oldest participant	Stefan Burkart	38 years, 10 months, 14 days	Merlene Ottey	44 years, 4 months, 11 days

=== Gender ===
Since introduction of testing by the IAAF in the early-20th century, female sprinters may be subject to gender verification. This rule was first formally applied to the 100 m at the 1968 Mexico Olympics. No 100 m sprinter has been publicly barred at an Olympic competition. However, there have been historic cases involving two women's medallists: 1932 champion Stanisława Walasiewicz and 1964 bronze medallist Ewa Kłobukowska, both of Poland. Walasiewicz endured accusations during her career due to her appearance, but was never subject to a test. An autopsy following her death in a shooting revealed ambiguous genitalia. Walasiewicz accused Helen Stephens (who beat her in the 1936 final) of being male and, despite there being no relevant rules on the matter, officials performed a physical examination of Stephens' external genitalia and concluded that she was female. Kłobukowska was not tested at the Olympics, thus did not lose her Olympic medals, but was subsequently disqualified at the 1967 European Cup on the basis of having a chromosomal mosaic. Intersex athletes are restricted from competition in the 100 m without having undergone surgery and hormonal therapy, as a result of the 2003 Stockholm consensus ruling by the IOC.

=== Race ===
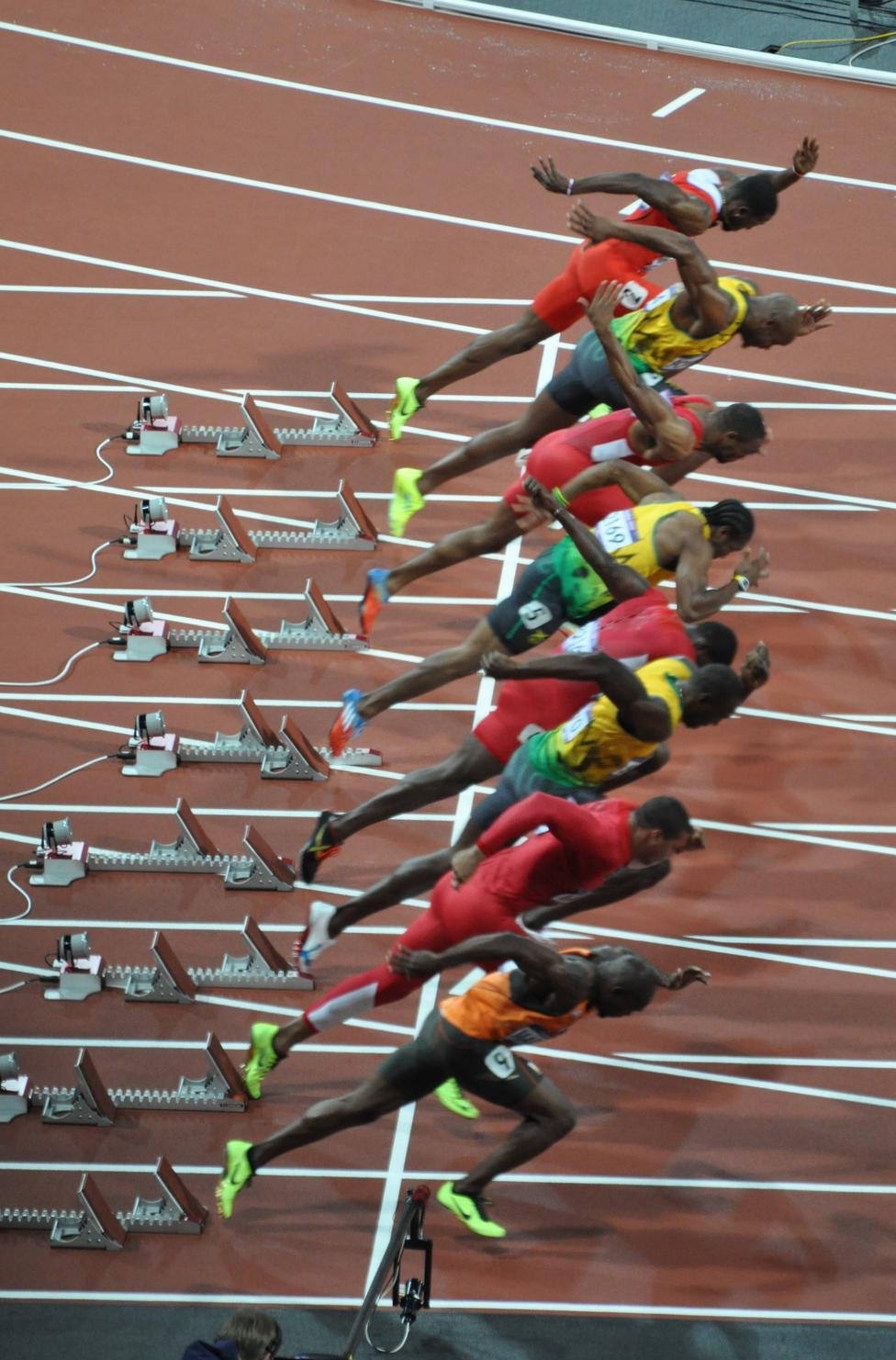
Runners in the men's 100-metre final at the 2012 Summer Olympics

Olympic 100 m medallists in the early phase of the Modern Olympic Games were principally white, Western sprinters of European descent, largely reflecting the euro-centric make up of the nations that took part and the ideological environment of racial segregation at the time ; As the Olympic competition began to attract wider international participation, athletes with African heritage began to reach and eventually dominate the 100 m Olympic podium, particularly African-Americans and Afro-Caribbeans.

Eddie Tolan became the first non-white winner of the event in 1932 and this signified the start of a prolonged period of success by black male sprinters; since 1932 only five men's Olympic champions in the event have not had significant African heritage. The women's event was dominated by runners of European descent until Wilma Rudolph won the title in 1960. Soviet and German women returned to the podium in the period from 1972 to 1980, but since then African-American and Jamaican women have won the great majority of 100 m medals. Dominance in the men's event has been particularly pronounced from 1984 to 2016, during which time in a span of almost 40 years all the men's Olympic 100 m finalists have been of African heritage.

In the 2020 Olympics, Chinese sprinter Su Bingtian ran 9.83 in his semi-final heat and became the first athlete without African heritage to reach the final since 1980 within the span of 40 years, setting an unofficial fastest 60 metres split record en route. 9.83 is also the second-fastest semi-final time and made him the fifth-fastest man in the history of 100 metres at the Olympics, behind Usain Bolt, Yohan Blake, Justin Gatlin and Marcel Jacobs. Most commentators attribute this statistical discrepancy to genetic rather than to cultural factors.

== Doping ==
All athletes who participate in the Olympic 100 m competition are subject to the World Anti-Doping Code—the IAAF and International Olympic Committee (IOC) are both signatories. Mandatory in-competition drug testing was introduced at the 1968 Summer Olympics.

One of the most prominent cases of doping at the Olympics, and in sport as a whole, occurred during the 1988 Seoul Olympics. Ben Johnson entered the race as the reigning 100 metres world record holder and won the Olympic final, raising his arm in victory, in a new world record of 9.79 seconds to much fanfare. Soon after being awarded the gold medal the results of his post-race drug test revealed his urine contained traces of stanozolol (a banned steroid). Johnson later admitted to doping, but he and his coach Charlie Francis still claimed he had his drink spiked at the Olympics, as Johnson was taking a different type of steroid at the time. The positive test had long-lasting effects on public perception of the sport and advanced the case for more stringent drug testing. The Canadian government launched an investigation into drugs in sport, known as the Dubin Inquiry, the following year. The 1988 Olympic men's 100 metres final has been referred to as "the dirtiest race in history", as only two of the eight finalists remained free of doping issues during their careers.

Ekaterini Thanou, the 2000 women's silver medallist, was barred from the 2004 Athens Olympics after failing to attend a pre-competition drugs test (her third consecutive missed test). The Greek sprinter and her teammate Kostas Kenteris were convicted of staging a motorcycle crash to avoid the test, but this was overturned on appeal. Her doping ban remained as they admitted to having missed the tests. Tameka Williams was banned from competing in the 100 m at the 2012 Olympics when, at the Olympic village, she admitted to the Saint Kitts and Nevis management team that she had been ingesting a banned substance. Bulgaria's Tezdzhan Naimova had her 2008 Olympic performance annulled and received a two-year ban after it was proved that she had tampered with her drug test a month prior to the competition.

Another high-profile doping case involved the 2000 Olympic women's 100 m champion Marion Jones, though no doping infractions occurred during the Olympics. Having been one of the stars of the games—she won three gold and two bronze medals in track and field events—Jones was later implicated in doping through the BALCO scandal. She lied to federal agents and a grand jury during questioning around the scandal, but later admitted in 2007 to using Tetrahydrogestrinone (THG) during the period of her Olympic success. The IOC annulled all her Olympic results, including her 100 m title. Given that the 2000 women's runner-up Ekaterini Thanou had herself been banned for drug usage, the IOC chose not to upgrade her to the gold medal position, but rather leave the position vacant. Working around the dilemma, the IOC decided to raise bronze medallist Tayna Lawrence to joint silver and fourth-placed Merlene Ottey to the bronze medal position.

In spite of the relatively few occasions in which 100 m sprinters have failed doping tests at the Olympics, numerous Olympic sprinters have been banned outside the competition or implicated otherwise, including many medallists. Two-time Olympic champion Carl Lewis had a positive drug test for stimulants at the US Olympic trials. The United States Olympic Committee accepted his claim of inadvertent use, since a dietary supplement he ingested was found to contain "Ma huang", the Chinese name for Ephedra (ephedrine is known to help weight loss). The 1992 Olympic champion Linford Christie was banned for nandrolone later in his career. Angel Guillermo Heredia accused the 2000 Olympic champion Maurice Greene of doping; Greene admitted meeting Heredia but claimed it was common for him to pay for "stuff" for other members of his training group, and reiterated that he had never used banned drugs. Justin Gatlin, the men's gold medallist in 2004, served a doping suspension both before and after his Olympic win, and returned to the podium at the 2012 Olympics. The men's runner-up in 2012, Yohan Blake, was banned for consuming a stimulant in 2009.

On the women's side, the Olympic 100 m was affected by state-sponsored doping in East Germany. Stasi documents released after the fall of the Berlin Wall revealed extensive drug usage by Olympic sprinters, including the 1976 and 1980 silver medallists Renate Stecher and Marlies Göhr, as well as the 1988 bronze medallist Heike Drechsler. Shelly-Ann Fraser, twice Olympic champion, received a six-month ban in 2010 for taking a prohibited narcotic for pain relief. A similar system was in place in the Soviet Union with major revelations concerning the Soviet state-sponsored doping program in preparation for the 1984 Olympics coming to light in 2016. The 2008 runner-up Sherone Simpson was banned in 2013 after a positive test for a stimulant and two-time bronze medallist Veronica Campbell-Brown failed a test for a diuretic that same year. A fourth Jamaican medallist, Merlene Ottey, received a ban for the steroid nandrolone in 1999 but this was rescinded on appeal due to laboratory errors.

== Medal summary ==
=== Men ===
Games	Gold	Silver	Bronze
1896 Athens	Thomas Burke; United States	Fritz Hofmann; Germany	Francis Lane; United States
1896 Athens	Thomas Burke; United States	Fritz Hofmann; Germany	Alajos Szokolyi; Hungary
1900 Paris	Frank Jarvis; United States	Walter Tewksbury; United States	Stan Rowley; Australia
1904 St. Louis	Archie Hahn; United States	Nathaniel Cartmell; United States	William Hogenson; United States
1908 London	Reggie Walker; South Africa	James Rector; United States	Robert Kerr; Canada
1912 Stockholm	Ralph Craig; United States	Alvah Meyer; United States	Donald Lippincott; United States
1920 Antwerp	Charley Paddock; United States	Morris Kirksey; United States	Harry Edward; Great Britain
1924 Paris	Harold Abrahams; Great Britain	Jackson Scholz; United States	Arthur Porritt, Baron Porritt; New Zealand
1928 Amsterdam	Percy Williams; Canada	Jack London (athlete); Great Britain	Georg Lammers; Germany
1932 Los Angeles	Eddie Tolan; United States	Ralph Metcalfe; United States	Arthur Jonath; Germany
1936 Berlin	Jesse Owens; United States	Ralph Metcalfe; United States	Tinus Osendarp; Netherlands
1948 London	Harrison Dillard; United States	Barney Ewell; United States	Lloyd LaBeach; Panama
1952 Helsinki	Lindy Remigino; United States	Herb McKenley; Jamaica	McDonald Bailey; Great Britain
1956 Melbourne	Bobby Morrow; United States	Thane Baker; United States	Hector Hogan; Australia
1960 Rome	Armin Hary; United Team of Germany	Dave Sime; United States	Peter Radford; Great Britain
1964 Tokyo	Bob Hayes; United States	Enrique Figuerola; Cuba	Harry Jerome; Canada
1968 Mexico City	Jim Hines; United States	Lennox Miller; Jamaica	Charles Greene; United States
1972 Munich	Valeriy Borzov; Soviet Union	Robert Taylor; United States	Lennox Miller; Jamaica
1976 Montreal	Hasely Crawford; Trinidad and Tobago	Don Quarrie; Jamaica	Valeriy Borzov; Soviet Union
1980 Moscow	Allan Wells; Great Britain	Silvio Leonard; Cuba	Petar Petrov; Bulgaria
1984 Los Angeles	Carl Lewis; United States	Sam Graddy; United States	Ben Johnson; Canada
1988 Seoul	Carl Lewis; United States	Linford Christie; Great Britain	Calvin Smith; United States
1992 Barcelona	Linford Christie; Great Britain	Frankie Fredericks; Namibia	Dennis Mitchell; United States
1996 Atlanta	Donovan Bailey; Canada	Frankie Fredericks; Namibia	Ato Boldon; Trinidad and Tobago
2000 Sydney	Maurice Greene; United States	Ato Boldon; Trinidad and Tobago	Obadele Thompson; Barbados
2004 Athens	Justin Gatlin; United States	Francis Obikwelu; Portugal	Maurice Greene; United States
2008 Beijing	Usain Bolt; Jamaica	Richard Thompson; Trinidad and Tobago	Walter Dix; United States
2012 London	Usain Bolt; Jamaica	Yohan Blake; Jamaica	Justin Gatlin; United States
2016 Rio de Janeiro	Usain Bolt; Jamaica	Justin Gatlin; United States	Andre De Grasse; Canada
2020 Tokyo	Marcell Jacobs; Italy	Fred Kerley; United States	Andre De Grasse; Canada
2024 Paris	Noah Lyles; United States	Kishane Thompson; Jamaica	Fred Kerley; United States
2028 Los Angeles			

==== Multiple medallists ====
Rank	Athlete	Nation	Olympics	Gold	Silver	Bronze	Total
1	Usain Bolt	Jamaica	2008–2016	3	0	0	3
2	Carl Lewis	United States	1984–1988	2	0	0	2
3	Justin Gatlin	United States	2004–2016	1	1	1	3
4	Linford Christie	Great Britain	1988–1992	1	1	0	2
5	Valeriy Borzov	Soviet Union	1972–1976	1	0	1	2
5	Maurice Greene	United States	2000–2004	1	0	1	2
7	Ralph Metcalfe	United States	1932–1936	0	2	0	2
7	Frankie Fredericks	Namibia	1992–1996	0	2	0	2
9	Lennox Miller	Jamaica	1968–1972	0	1	1	2
9	Ato Boldon	Trinidad and Tobago	1996–2000	0	1	1	2
9	Fred Kerley	United States	2020–2024	0	1	1	2
12	Andre De Grasse	Canada	2016–2020	0	0	2	2

==== Medals by country ====
Rank	Nation	Gold	Silver	Bronze	Total
1	United States	17	15	10	42
2	Great Britain	4	2	3	9
3	Jamaica	3	4	1	8
4	Canada	2	0	5	7
5	Trinidad and Tobago	1	2	1	4
6	Soviet Union	1	0	1	2
7	Italy	1	0	0	1
7	South Africa	1	0	0	1
7	United Team of Germany	1	0	0	1
10	Cuba	0	2	0	2
10	Namibia	0	2	0	2
12	Germany	0	1	2	3
13	Portugal	0	1	0	1
14	Australia	0	0	2	2
15	Barbados	0	0	1	1
15	Bulgaria	0	0	1	1
15	Hungary	0	0	1	1
15	Netherlands	0	0	1	1
15	New Zealand	0	0	1	1
15	Panama	0	0	1	1
Totals (20 entries)		31	29	31	91

=== Women ===
Games	Gold	Silver	Bronze
1928 Amsterdam	Betty Robinson; United States	Fanny Rosenfeld; Canada	Ethel Smith; Canada
1932 Los Angeles	Stanisława Walasiewicz; Poland	Hilda Strike; Canada	Wilhelmina von Bremen; United States
1936 Berlin	Helen Stephens; United States	Stanisława Walasiewicz; Poland	Käthe Krauß; Germany
1948 London	Fanny Blankers-Koen; Netherlands	Dorothy Manley; Great Britain	Shirley Strickland; Australia
1952 Helsinki	Marjorie Jackson; Australia	Daphne Hasenjäger; South Africa	Shirley Strickland de la Hunty; Australia
1956 Melbourne	Betty Cuthbert; Australia	Christa Stubnick; United Team of Germany	Marlene Mathews; Australia
1960 Rome	Wilma Rudolph; United States	Dorothy Hyman; Great Britain	Giuseppina Leone; Italy
1964 Tokyo	Wyomia Tyus; United States	Edith McGuire; United States	Ewa Kłobukowska; Poland
1968 Mexico City	Wyomia Tyus; United States	Barbara Ferrell; United States	Irena Szewińska; Poland
1972 Munich	Renate Stecher; East Germany	Raelene Boyle; Australia	Silvia Chivás; Cuba
1976 Montreal	Annegret Richter; West Germany	Renate Stecher; East Germany	Inge Helten; West Germany
1980 Moscow	Lyudmila Kondratyeva; Soviet Union	Marlies Göhr; East Germany	Ingrid Auerswald; East Germany
1984 Los Angeles	Evelyn Ashford; United States	Alice Brown; United States	Merlene Ottey; Jamaica
1988 Seoul	Florence Griffith Joyner; United States	Evelyn Ashford; United States	Heike Drechsler; East Germany
1992 Barcelona	Gail Devers; United States	Juliet Cuthbert; Jamaica	Irina Privalova; Unified Team
1996 Atlanta	Gail Devers; United States	Merlene Ottey; Jamaica	Gwen Torrence; United States
2000 Sydney	Vacant	Ekaterini Thanou; Greece	Merlene Ottey; Jamaica
2000 Sydney	Vacant	Tayna Lawrence; Jamaica	Merlene Ottey; Jamaica
2004 Athens	Yulia Nestsiarenka; Belarus	Lauryn Williams; United States	Veronica Campbell; Jamaica
2008 Beijing	Shelly-Ann Fraser; Jamaica	Sherone Simpson; Jamaica	none awarded
2008 Beijing	Shelly-Ann Fraser; Jamaica	Kerron Stewart; Jamaica	none awarded
2012 London	Shelly-Ann Fraser-Pryce; Jamaica	Carmelita Jeter; United States	Veronica Campbell-Brown; Jamaica
2016 Rio de Janeiro	Elaine Thompson; Jamaica	Tori Bowie; United States	Shelly-Ann Fraser-Pryce; Jamaica
2020 Tokyo	Elaine Thompson-Herah; Jamaica	Shelly-Ann Fraser-Pryce; Jamaica	Shericka Jackson; Jamaica
2024 Paris	Julien Alfred; Saint Lucia	Sha'Carri Richardson; United States	Melissa Jefferson; United States
2028 Los Angeles			

==== Multiple medallists ====
Rank	Athlete	Nation	Olympics	Gold	Silver	Bronze	Total
1	Shelly-Ann Fraser-Pryce	Jamaica	2008–2020	2	1	1	4
2	Wyomia Tyus	United States	1964–1968	2	0	0	2
2	Gail Devers	United States	1992–1996	2	0	0	2
2	Elaine Thompson-Herah	Jamaica	2016–2020	2	0	0	2
5	Stanisława Walasiewicz	Poland	1932–1936	1	1	0	2
5	Renate Stecher	East Germany	1972–1976	1	1	0	2
5	Evelyn Ashford	United States	1984–1988	1	1	0	2
8	Merlene Ottey	Jamaica	1984–2000	0	1	2	3
9	Shirley Strickland	Australia	1948–1952	0	0	2	2
9	Veronica Campbell-Brown	Jamaica	2004–2012	0	0	2	2

==== Medals by country ====
Rank	Nation	Gold	Silver	Bronze	Total
1	United States	9	8	3	20
2	Jamaica	4	6	6	16
3	Australia	2	1	3	6
4	East Germany	1	2	2	5
5	Poland	1	1	2	4
6	West Germany	1	0	1	2
7	Belarus	1	0	0	1
7	Netherlands	1	0	0	1
7	Saint Lucia	1	0	0	1
7	Soviet Union	1	0	0	1
11	Canada	0	2	1	3
12	Great Britain	0	2	0	2
13	Greece	0	1	0	1
13	South Africa	0	1	0	1
13	United Team of Germany	0	1	0	1
16	Cuba	0	0	1	1
16	Germany	0	0	1	1
16	Italy	0	0	1	1
16	Unified Team	0	0	1	1
Totals (19 entries)		22	25	22	69

=== Overall ===
==== Medals by country ====
Rank	Nation	Gold	Silver	Bronze	Total
1	United States	25	22	11	58
2	Jamaica	7	10	7	24
3	Great Britain	3	4	3	10
4	Canada	2	2	6	10
5	Australia	2	1	5	8
6	Soviet Union	2	0	1	3
7	East Germany	1	2	2	5
8	Trinidad and Tobago	1	2	1	4
9	Poland	1	1	2	4
10	South Africa	1	1	0	2
10	United Team of Germany	1	1	0	2
12	Italy	1	0	1	2
12	Netherlands	1	0	1	2
12	West Germany	1	0	1	2
15	Belarus	1	0	0	1
15	Saint Lucia	1	0	0	1
17	Cuba	0	2	1	3
18	Namibia	0	2	0	2
19	Germany	0	1	3	4
20	Greece	0	1	0	1
20	Portugal	0	1	0	1
22	Barbados	0	0	1	1
22	Bulgaria	0	0	1	1
22	Hungary	0	0	1	1
22	New Zealand	0	0	1	1
22	Panama	0	0	1	1
22	Unified Team	0	0	1	1
Totals (27 entries)		51	53	51	155

== Olympic record progression ==
The best time for the 100 m set during Olympic competition is known as the Olympic record. To count as an official record, the race and the equipment used must adhere to IAAF international rules. Hand-timed results were the standard until 1975, when fully automatic timing (FAT) became the preferred method for officially measuring athletes' times. Further to this wind conditions must be measured and any time achieved with a wind speed of over 2.0 metres per second in a direction behind the athlete is treated as wind-assisted and cannot be taken for an Olympic record mark.

Since the first men's Olympic record of 12.2 seconds by Frank Lane in 1896, the record has been broken 13 times and matched 24 times. Twenty-eight men have been holder (or co-holder) of the record. Usain Bolt is the current record holder with 9.63, set in 2012. Further to this standing men's world record for the 100 m has been equalled five times in Olympic competition and improved twice (by Carl Lewis in 1988 with 9.92 and by Bolt in 2008 with 9.69). Ben Johnson's time of 9.79 was annulled before it was ratified as either an Olympic or world record.

Since the initial women's Olympic record of 13.0 seconds was set by Anni Holdmann in 1928, it has been broken 18 times and equalled 17 further times. The standing women's 100 m world record has been improved five times during Olympic competition and equalled seven times.

The tables below refer to hand-timing for races held prior to the 1972 Summer Olympics and to fully automatic times after that point, when they became the standard for the Olympics. Hand-timed results that matched the Olympic record are treated as equalling the mark, with the exception of any athletes that matched that time but finished behind another athlete in their race.

=== Men ===
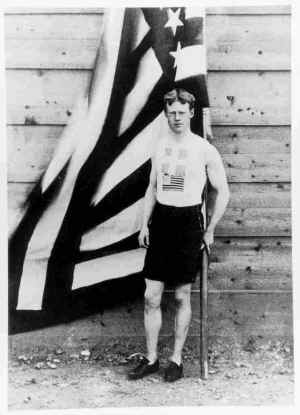
In the 1896 Summer Olympics, Thomas Curtis of the United States (pictured) tied Grantley Goulding of the United Kingdom in setting the first Olympic 100-metre record, completing the race in 12.2 seconds.

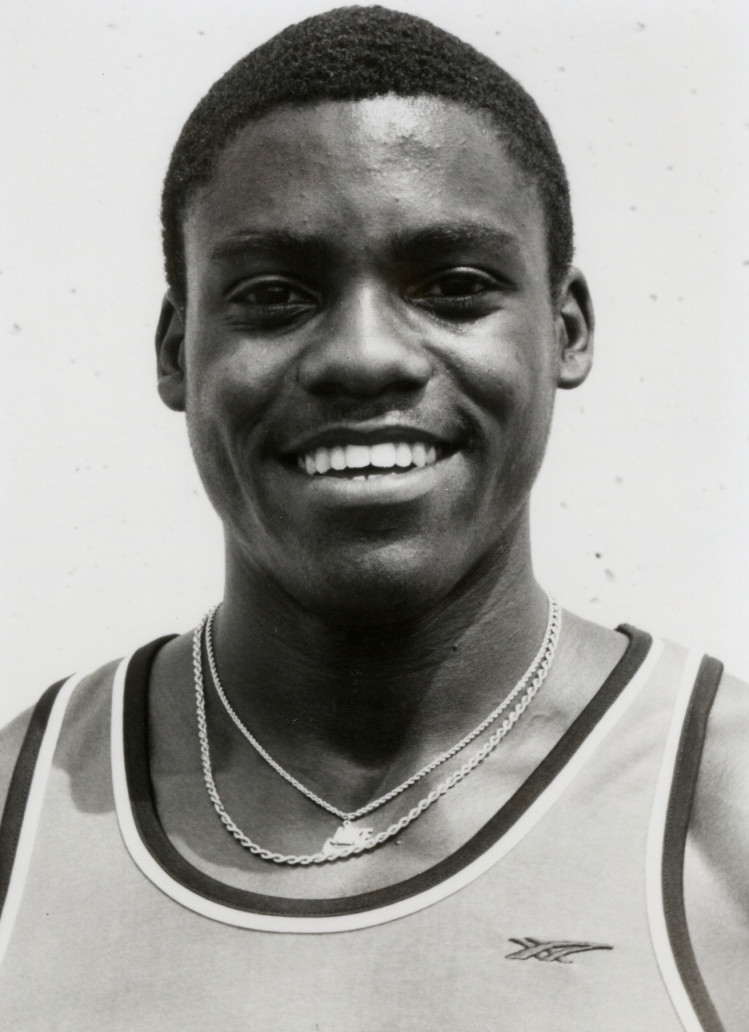
After Ben Johnson's disqualification, Carl Lewis's time of 9.92 was established as the Olympic and world record time.

Time	Athlete	Nation	Games	Round	Date
12.2	Francis Lane	United States	1896	Heat 1	1896-04-06
12.2	Thomas Curtis	United States	1896	Heat 2	1896-04-06
11.8	Tom Burke	United States	1896	Heat 3	1896-04-06
11.4	Arthur Duffey	United States	1900	Heat 1	1900-06-14
11.4	Walter Tewksbury	United States	1900	Heat 2	1900-06-14
10.8 =WR	Frank Jarvis	United States	1900	Heat 3	1900-06-14
10.8 =WR	Walter Tewksbury	United States	1900	Semi-final 2	1900-06-14
10.8	James Rector	United States	1908	Heat 15	1908-07-20
10.8	Reggie Walker	South Africa	1908	Semi-final 1	1908-07-20
10.8	James Rector	United States	1908	Semi-final 3	1908-07-20
10.8	Reggie Walker	South Africa	1908	Final	1908-07-20
10.8	David Jacobs	Great Britain	1912	Heat 10	1912-07-06
10.6	Donald Lippincott	United States	1912	Heat 16	1912-07-06
10.6	Harold Abrahams	Great Britain	1924	Quarter-final 4	1924-07-06
10.6	Harold Abrahams	Great Britain	1924	Semi-final 2	1924-07-07
10.6	Harold Abrahams	Great Britain	1924	Final	1924-07-07
10.6	Percy Williams	Canada (CAN)	1928	Quarter-final 4	1928-07-29
10.6	Robert McAllister	United States	1928	Semi-final 1	1928-07-30
10.6	Jack London	United States	1928	Semi-final 2	1928-07-30
10.6	Arthur Jonath	Germany	1932	Heat 3	1932-07-31
10.4	Eddie Tolan	United States	1932	Quarter-final 1	1932-07-31
10.3 =WR	Eddie Tolan	United States	1932	Final	1932-08-01
10.3	Jesse Owens	United States	1936	Heat 1	1936-08-02
10.3	Harrison Dillard	United States	1948	Final	1948-07-31
10.3	Bobby Joe Morrow	United States	1956	Quarter-final 1	1956-11-23
10.3	Ira Murchison	United States	1956	Quarter-final 2	1956-11-23
10.3	Bobby Joe Morrow	United States	1956	Semi-final 2	1956-11-24
10.2	Armin Hary	West Germany	1960	Quarter-final 2	1960-08-31
10.2	Armin Hary	West Germany	1960	Final	1960-08-31
10.0 =WR	Bob Hayes	United States	1964	Final	1964-10-15
10.0 A	Hermes Ramírez	Cuba	1968	Quarter-final 2	1968-10-13
10.0 A	Charlie Greene	United States	1968	Quarter-final 4	1968-10-13
10.0 A	Jim Hines	United States	1968	Semi-final 1	1968-10-14
9.9 A =WR	Jim Hines	United States	1968	Final	1968-10-14
9.92 WR^{[nb3]}	Carl Lewis	United States	1988	Final	1988-09-24
9.84 WR	Donovan Bailey	Canada	1996	Final	1996-07-27
9.69 WR	Usain Bolt	Jamaica	2008	Final	2008-08-16
9.63	Usain Bolt	Jamaica	2012	Final	2012-08-05

- ^{nb3} Carl Lewis's time of 9.92 seconds in the 1988 Olympic final was initially second to Ben Johnson's 9.79, but Johnson was disqualified soon after due to a failed drug test.

=== Women ===
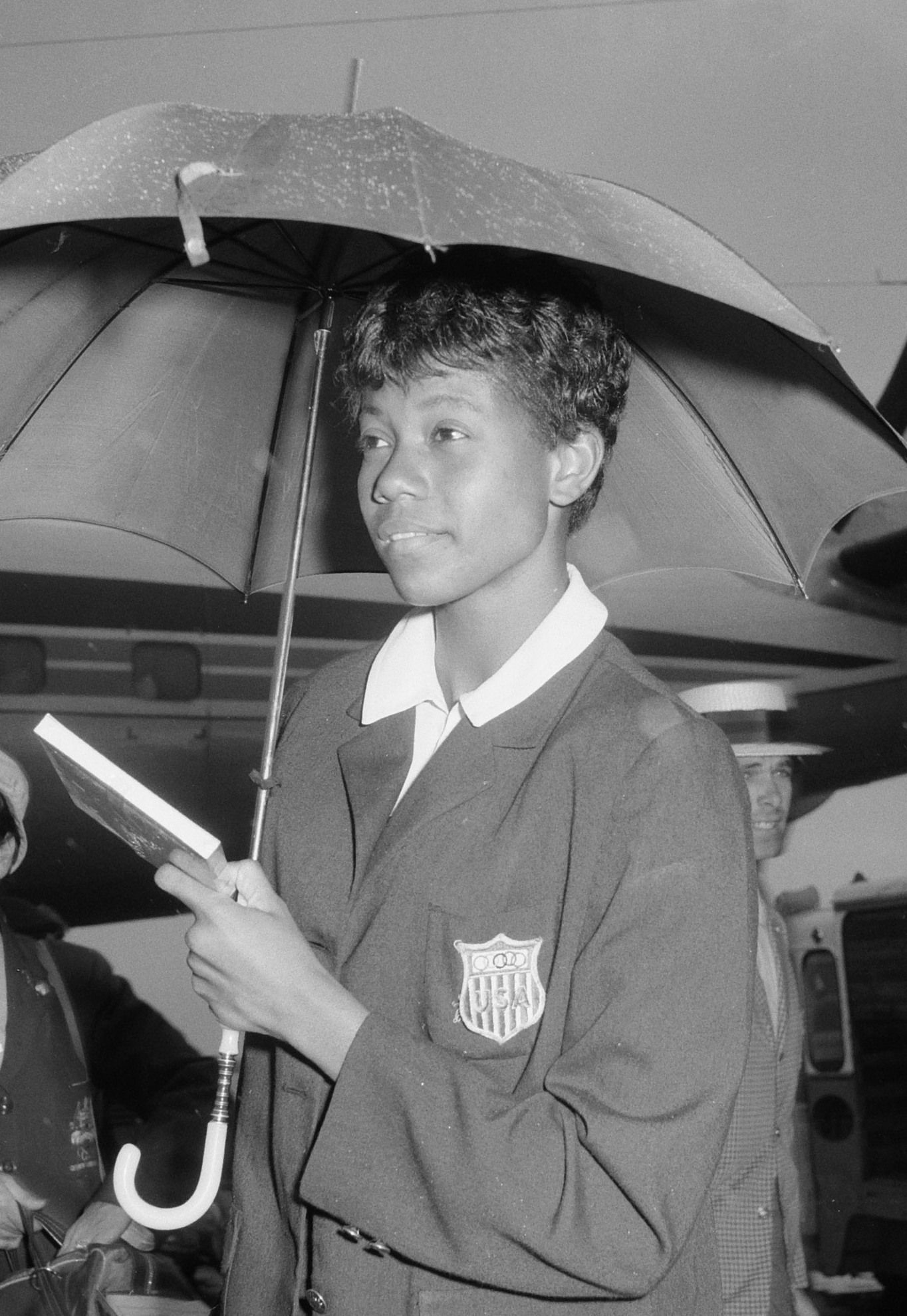
Wilma Rudolph's time of 11.3 in 1960 was an Olympic and world record time.

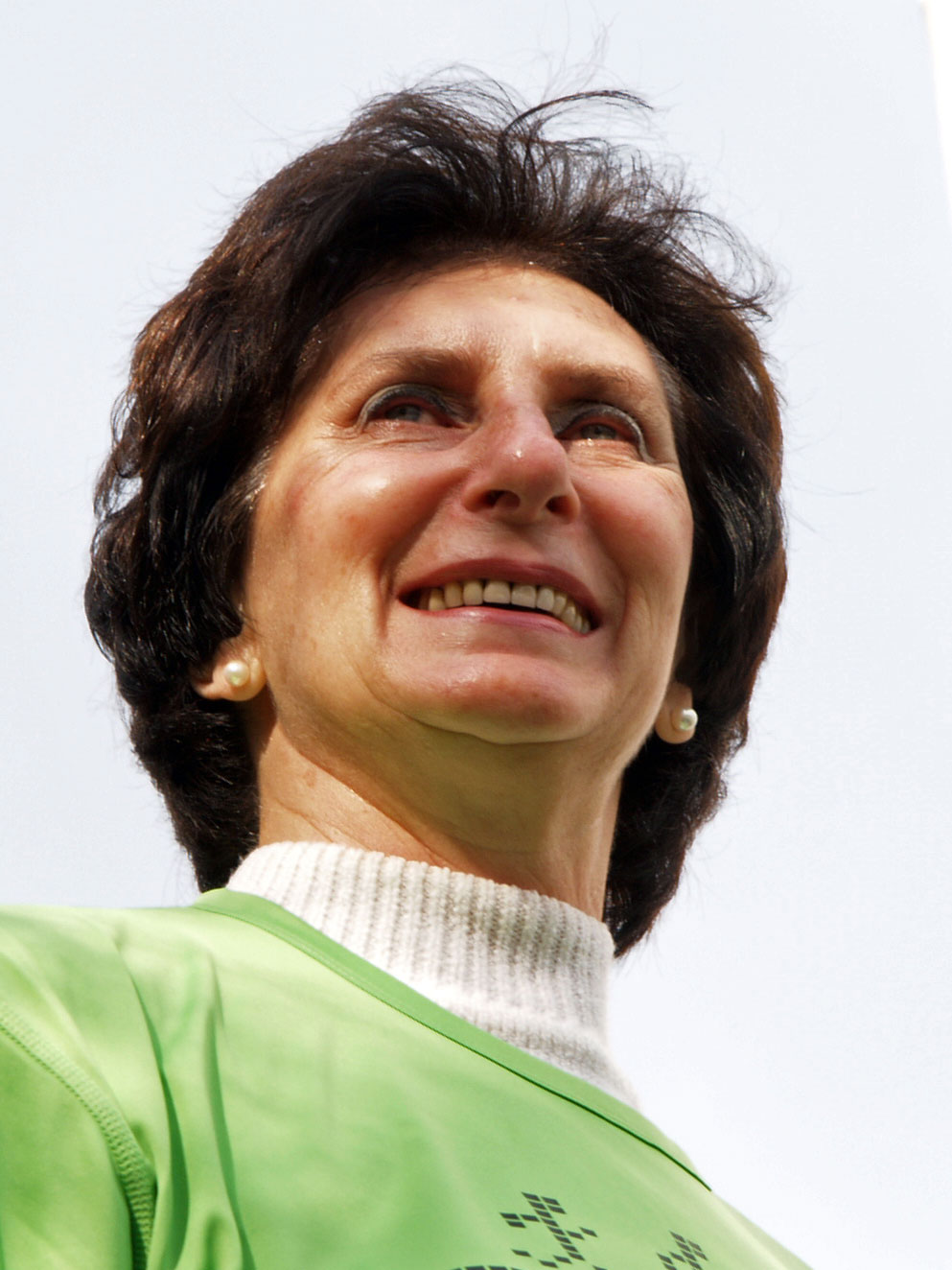
Irena Szewińska's time of 11.1 seconds stood as the Olympic record for one day.

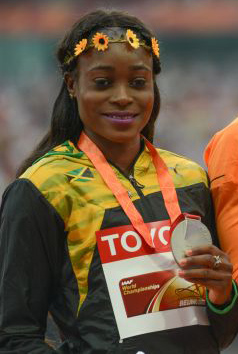
In 2021, Elaine Thompson-Herah ran 10.61 s to break Florence Griffith-Joyner's 1988 Olympic record of 10.62 s.

Time	Athlete	Nation	Games	Round	Date
13.0	Anni Holdmann	Germany	1928	Heat 1	1928-07-30
12.8	Erna Steinberg	Germany	1928	Heat 2	1928-07-30
12.8	Kinue Hitomi	Japan	1928	Heat 3	1928-07-30
12.8	Leni Junker	Germany	1928	Heat 4	1928-07-30
12.8	Leni Schmidt	Germany	1928	Heat 6	1928-07-30
12.6	Fanny Rosenfeld	Canada (CAN)	1928	Heat 7	1928-07-30
12.6	Ethel Smith	Canada (CAN)	1928	Heat 9	1928-07-30
12.4	Fanny Rosenfeld	Canada (CAN)	1928	Semi-final 1	1928-07-30
12.4	Betty Robinson	United States	1928	Semi-final 2	1928-07-30
12.2 WR	Betty Robinson	United States	1928	Final	1928-07-31
12.2	Marie Dollinger	Germany	1932	Heat 1	1932-08-01
11.9 WR	Stanisława Walasiewicz	Poland	1932	Heat 2	1932-08-01
11.9 =WR	Stanisława Walasiewicz	Poland	1932	Semi-final 2	1932-08-01
11.9 =WR	Stanisława Walasiewicz	Poland	1932	Final	1932-08-02
11.9	Fanny Blankers-Koen	Netherlands	1948	Final	1948-08-02
11.9	Catherine Hardy	United States	1952	Heat 7	1952-07-21
11.6	Marjorie Jackson	Australia	1952	Heat 8	1952-07-21
11.6	Marjorie Jackson	Australia	1952	Quarter-final 1	1952-07-21
11.5 =WR	Marjorie Jackson	Australia	1952	Semi-final 1	1952-07-22
11.5 =WR	Marjorie Jackson	Australia	1952	Final	1952-07-22
11.5	Marlene Mathews	Australia	1956	Heat 2	1956-11-24
11.4	Betty Cuthbert	Australia	1956	Heat 3	1956-11-24
11.3 =WR	Wilma Rudolph	United States	1960	Semi-final 1	1960-09-02
11.2 =WR	Wyomia Tyus	United States	1964	Quarter-final 1	1964-10-15
11.2 A	Wyomia Tyus	United States	1968	Heat 1	1968-10-14
11.2 A	Margaret Bailes	United States	1968	Heat 2	1968-10-14
11.2 A	Barbara Ferrell	United States	1968	Heat 6	1968-10-14
11.1 A =WR	Barbara Ferrell	United States	1968	Quarter-final 1	1968-10-14
11.1 A =WR	Irena Szewińska-Kirszenstein	Poland	1968	Quarter-final 4	1968-10-14
11.0 A WR	Wyomia Tyus	United States	1968	Final	1968-10-15
11.07 WR	Renate Stecher	East Germany	1972	Quarter-final 1	1972-09-01
11.05	Annegret Richter	West Germany	1976	Quarter-final 1	1976-07-24
11.01 WR	Annegret Richter	West Germany	1976	Semi-final 1	1976-07-25
10.97	Evelyn Ashford	United States	1984	Final	1984-08-05
10.88	Florence Griffith Joyner	United States	1988	Heat 7	1988-09-24
10.88	Evelyn Ashford	United States	1988	Quarter-final 2	1988-09-24
10.62	Florence Griffith Joyner	United States	1988	Quarter-final 3	1988-09-24
10.61	Elaine Thompson-Herah	Jamaica	2021	Final	2021-07-31

== Finishing times ==
The Olympic 100 m is the most prestigious competition for the distance and it attracts elite level, international competitors. The winner of the race is occasionally referred to as "the world's fastest" man or woman, reflecting the high level of the competition and the quality of performances. As of February 2014, the current Olympic records of 9.63 for men and 10.62 seconds for women rank as the second and third fastest times in history, for men and women respectively. The standard of performances at the Olympics has progressed in line with the discipline as a whole and the times in the final often rank highly in the end-of-season lists. National records and personal bests are frequently improved at the event by sprinters from large and small nations alike, as most elite athletes aim to reach peak race fitness for the Olympics.

The 2024 men's final was the fastest 100-meter race in history, collectively: all eight men ran under 9.91 seconds. The 2012 women's final was, collectively, the fastest women's 100 m race ever: seven of the eight finalists ran 11 seconds or faster for the first time, with Veronica Campbell-Brown becoming the fastest ever bronze medallist with her time of 10.81 seconds and Tianna Madison becoming the fastest non-medallist with her time of 10.85 seconds.

=== Top ten fastest Olympic times ===
Fastest men's times at the Olympics
Rank	Time (sec)	Athlete	Nation	Games	Date
1	9.63	Usain Bolt	Jamaica	2012	2012-08-05
2	9.69	Usain Bolt	Jamaica	2008	2008-08-16
3	9.75	Yohan Blake	Jamaica	2012	2012-08-05
4	9.79	Justin Gatlin	United States	2012	2012-08-05
4	9.79	Noah Lyles	United States	2024	2024-08-04
4	9.79	Kishane Thompson	Jamaica	2024	2024-08-04
7	9.80	Lamont Marcell Jacobs	Italy	2020	2021-08-01
7	9.80	Kishane Thompson	Jamaica	2024^{SF}	2024-08-04
9	9.81	Usain Bolt	Jamaica	2016	2016-08-14
9	9.81	Fred Kerley	United States	2024	2024-08-04
9	9.81	Oblique Seville	Jamaica	2024^{SF}	2024-08-04
10	9.83	Su Bingtian	China	2020^{SF}	2020-08-05

Fastest women's times at the Olympics
Rank	Time (sec)	Athlete	Nation	Games	Date
1	10.61	Elaine Thompson-Herah	Jamaica	2020	2021-07-31
2	10.62	Florence Griffith Joyner	United States	1988^{QF}	1988-07-16
3	10.71	Elaine Thompson-Herah	Jamaica	2016	2016-08-13
4	10.72	Julien Alfred	Saint Lucia	2024	2024-08-03
5	10.73	Shelly-Ann Fraser-Pryce	Jamaica	2020^{SF}	2021-07-31
6	10.74	Shelly-Ann Fraser-Pryce	Jamaica	2020	2021-07-31
7	10.75	Shelly-Ann Fraser-Pryce	Jamaica	2012	2012-08-04
8	10.76	Shericka Jackson	Jamaica	2020	2021-07-31
8	10.76	Elaine Thompson-Herah	Jamaica	2020^{SF}	2021-07-31
10	10.78	Shelly-Ann Fraser	Jamaica	2008	2008-08-17
10	10.78	Carmelita Jeter	United States	2012	2012-08-04
10	10.78	Marie Josée Ta Lou	Ivory Coast	2020^{H}	2021-07-30

- ^{H} – time recorded in the heats
- ^{QF} – time recorded in the quarter-finals
- ^{SF} – time recorded in the semi-finals

Note: Florence Griffith-Joyner ran 10.54 (+3.0) and 10.70 (+2.6) in the finals and semifinals of the 100 m at the 1988 Seoul Olympics, however, both were over the legal wind speed limit of +2.0 m/s.

=== Best time for place ===
Fastest Men's times for place in an Olympic final
Place	Time	Athlete	Nation	Games	Date
1	9.63	Usain Bolt	Jamaica	2012	2012-08-05
2	9.75	Yohan Blake	Jamaica	2012	2012-08-05
3	9.79	Justin Gatlin	United States	2012	2012-08-05
4	9.82	Akani Simbine	South Africa	2024	2024-08-04
5	9.85	Lamont Jacobs	Italy	2024	2024-08-04
6	9.86	Letsile Tebogo	Botswana	2024	2024-08-04
7	9.88	Kenny Bednarek	United States	2024	2024-08-04
8	9.91	Oblique Seville	Jamaica	2024	2024-08-04

Fastest women's times for place in an Olympic final
Place	Time	Athlete	Nation	Games	Date
1	10.61	Elaine Thompson-Herah	Jamaica	2020	2021-07-31
2	10.74	Shelly-Ann Fraser-Pryce	Jamaica	2020	2021-07-31
3	10.76	Shericka Jackson	Jamaica	2020	2021-07-31
4	10.85	Tianna Bartoletta	United States	2012	2012-08-04
5	10.88	Merlene Ottey	Jamaica	1992	1992-08-01
6	10.92	Michelle-Lee Ahye	Trinidad and Tobago	2016	2016-08-13
7	10.94	English Gardner	United States	2016	2016-08-13
8	11.01	Blessing Okagbare	Nigeria	2012	2012-08-04

- Florence Griffith-Joyner ran 10.54 to win the final of the 1988 Olympic Games, but the wind was over the legal limit (+3.0)

== Intercalated Games ==
The 1906 Intercalated Games were held in Athens and at the time were officially recognised as part of the Olympic Games series, with the intention being to hold a games in Greece in two-year intervals between the internationally held Olympics. However, this plan never came to fruition and the International Olympic Committee (IOC) later decided not to recognise these games as part of the official Olympic series. Some sports historians continue to treat the results of these games as part of the Olympic canon.

At this event a men's 100 m was held and 1904 Olympic champion Archie Hahn of the United States won the race. Another American, Fay Moulton, was the runner-up and Australian Nigel Barker was the bronze medallist.

Games	Gold	Silver	Bronze
1906 Athens	Archie Hahn (USA)	Fay Moulton (USA)	Nigel Barker (AUS)

== Non-canonical Olympic events ==
In addition to the main 1900 Olympic men's 100 metres, two further 100 m events were held that year. A handicap race attracted 32 athletes from 10 countries and was won by Edmund Minahan, an American semi-finalist in the main 100 m competition, which had taken place five days earlier. A 100 m event for professionals only was held several weeks later. Four entrants are known and the winner was Edgar Bredin, a British former world record holder.

A 100 m professionals handicap race is also believed to have been held in 1900. In 1904 a 100-yard dash handicap race was contested and an American, C. Hastedt, was the victor.

These events are no longer considered part of the official Olympic history of the 100 m or the athletics programme in general. Consequently, medals from these races have not been assigned to nations on the all-time medal tables.

== Cultural impact ==
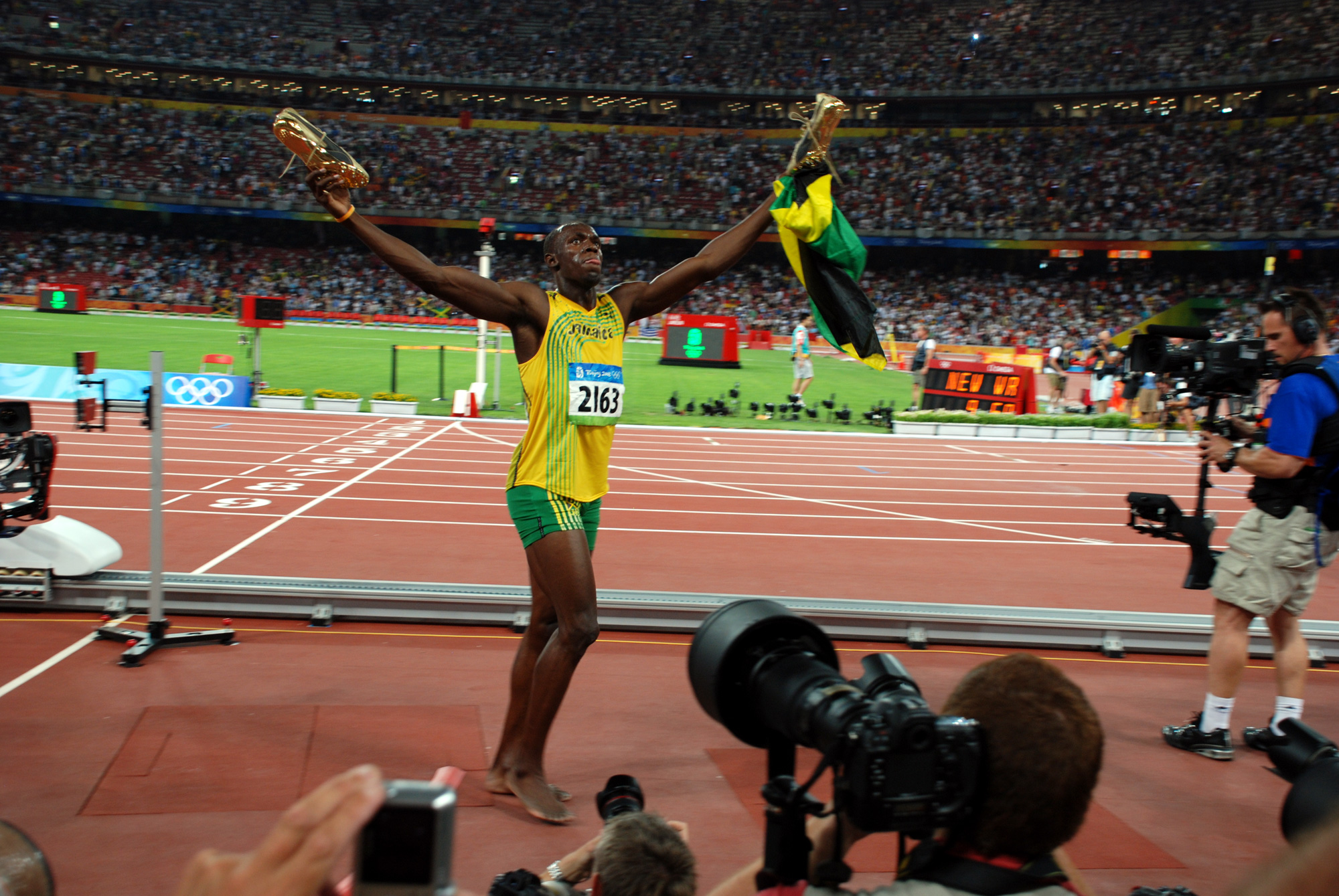
Usain Bolt's 2008 Olympic victory received global media coverage

The 100 metres is typically considered one of the blue ribbon Olympic track and field events, and of the Olympic Games as a whole. The Olympic 100 m finals, particularly the men's, are among the most popular events from any sport at the Olympics – the 2012 Olympic men's 100 metres final was the most watched event at the London Games by British audiences (with 20 million television viewers) while in the United States that event was the third-most viewed Olympic clip.

The high-profile nature of 100 m Olympic finals in some countries has served to encourage participation in sport among the wider public, particularly in short sprinting. Successive generations of athletes cite previous 100 m Olympic champions as the reason for their entering the sport. The history of the event has had particular impact for African-American athletes: Jesse Owens' Olympic 100 m gold was an early example of a black American achieving success on an international stage while Wilma Rudolph's 1960 win inspired many black American women. Owens' 100 m victory at the 1936 Berlin Olympics (one of four gold medals he won over seven days at the games) helped challenge notions of white supremacy that were popular during that era.

1996 Olympic 100 metre champion Donovan Bailey from Canada had his billing as "World's Fastest Man" questioned by the American media, who instead promoted 1996 Olympic 200 metre and 400 metre champion Michael Johnson from the United States. After much sparring between the two athletes and media of their respective countries, an unsanctioned 150-metre race was held at the SkyDome in Toronto to settle the matter, with Bailey winning while Johnson pulled up injured, and they earned $1.5 million and $500,000, respectively.

The Olympic 100 metres has been covered by several film documentaries. Chariots of Fire, a 1981 historical drama focusing on Harold Abrahams' victory at the 1924 Paris Olympics, is among the most prominent. The film won four Academy Awards, is often listed among polls for the best sports and Olympics films., and was ranked 19th in the British Film Institute's 100 Best British Films Wilma Rudolph was a central figure in The Grand Olympics (Italian: La grande olimpiade), an academy-Award nominated documentary about the 1960 Rome Olympics, where Rudolph's 100 m feats earned her the nickname La Gazzella Negra (The Black Gazelle). The 1988 Olympic final, featuring Ben Johnson and Carl Lewis has been the topic of documentaries, including ESPN's "9.79*" from the 30 for 30 series, as well as non-fiction books, such as Richard Moore's The Dirtiest Race in History.

Across the sport of track and field, Olympic 100 m champions have often featured on Athlete of the Year lists. Carl Lewis (1984), Evelyn Ashford (1984), Florence Griffith-Joyner (1988), Usain Bolt (2008) and Elaine Thompson-Herah (2021) were chosen as Track & Field News Athlete of the Year in the year of their Olympic victories. Lewis, Griffith-Joyner, Bolt and Thompson-Herah were also awarded the title of IAAF World Athlete of the Year for their Olympic feats.

== See also ==
- 100 metres at the World Championships in Athletics
- List of Paralympic medalists in the 100 metres
