= Charles Burroughs =

Charles Burroughs may refer to:

- Charles Burroughs (academic), art historian
- Charles Burroughs (athlete) (1876–1902), American track and field athlete
