= Charles Gmelin =

British athlete (1872–1950)

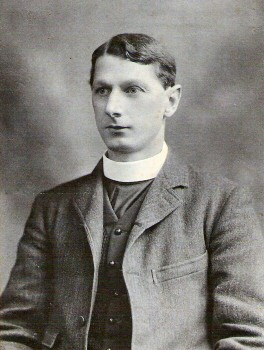

Personal information
- Nationality: British (English)
- Born: 28 May 1872 Krishnanagar, Nadia, British India
- Died: 12 October 1950 (aged 78) Oxford, England

Sport
- Sport: Athletics
- Event: Sprinting/400m
- Club: University of Oxford AC; Achilles Club
Medal record
Men's athletics
Representing Great Britain
Olympic Games
Bronze medal – third place	1896 Athens	400 metres

Charles Henry Stuart Gmelin (28 May 1872 – 12 October 1950) was a British athlete. He competed at the 1896 Summer Olympics in Athens.

== Personal life ==
Gmelin was born in Krishnanagar Nadia, in Bengal, India, where his father Frederick Gmelin was a Christian missionary. Gmelin returned to England at an early age for schooling.

He was educated at Magdalen College School and Keble College, Oxford. After graduating he took holy orders and later become headmaster of Freshfields School in Oxford, he eventually became curate in Summertown, Oxford and Kidlington in Oxfordshire. Gmelin was an all-round sportsman who represented Oxfordshire at both football and in cricket where he competed in the Minor Counties Championship from 1895 to 1906.

In August 1904 Gmelin married Hester Royds in Little Barford, Bedfordshire.

He died on 12 October 1950 at Cowley Road Hospital Oxford, aged 78, his wife Hester Mary Alington Royds died in April the following year.

== Olympic record ==
He had the distinction of being the first British athlete to compete in Olympic competition when he finished third in the inaugural heat of the 100 metres. He did not advance to the final.

He was more successful in the 400 metres where he finished second behind Thomas Burke of the United States in his preliminary heat. This qualified him for the final, where he placed third behind the United States pairing of Burke and Herbert Jamison in an estimated time of 55.6 seconds. For many years the German runner Fritz Hofmann was incorrectly listed as placing ahead of Gmelin.

Although no awards were made for third place in the 1896 Summer Olympics he is credited by the International Olympic Committee as a bronze medal winner. As per the record he was the first man to win a medal for Great Britain at a modern Olympics.
