= Athletics at the 1900 Summer Olympics – Men's 100 metres =

Men's 100 metres at the Games of the II Olympiad
- Frank Jarvis
- Venue: Bois de Boulogne
- Date: July 14
- Competitors: 20 from 9 nations
- Winning time: 11.0

Medalists
| 1st place, gold medalist(s) | | Frank Jarvis; United States |
| 2nd place, silver medalist(s) | | Walter Tewksbury; United States |
| 3rd place, bronze medalist(s) | | Stan Rowley; Australia |

The men's 100 metres was a sprinting event on the athletics programme at the 1900 Summer Olympics in Paris. It was held on July 14, 1900. 20 athletes from nine nations competed. The event was won by Frank Jarvis of the United States, the second of three straight gold medals by different Americans in the event. Australia medaled in the event for the first time, a bronze by Stan Rowley.

== Background ==
This was the second time the event was held. None of the 1896 runners competed in 1900. American Arthur Duffey had recently won the AAA Championships (at 100 yards) and was heavily favored. Unofficial world record holder (in an eight-way tie) Isaac Westergren of Sweden also entered the competition.

No athletes from France, the host nation, competed. Australia, Bohemia, India, and Italy were represented for the first time.

The 1900 competition was one of only two Olympic Games (the other being 1904) where the men's 100 metres was not the shortest sprint, as the 60 metres was held in those two Games.

== Records ==
These were the standing world and Olympic records (in seconds) prior to the 1900 Summer Olympics.

| World Record | 10.8 (Note: unofficial) | (United States) Luther Cary | Paris (FRA) | July 4, 1891 |
| World Record | 10.8 | (United Kingdom) Cecil Lee | Brussels (BEL) | September 25, 1892 |
| World Record | 10.8 | (Belgium) Étienne De Re | Brussels (BEL) | August 4, 1893 |
| World Record | 10.8 | (United Kingdom) L. Atcherley | Frankfurt/Main (GER) | April 13, 1895 |
| World Record | 10.8 | (United Kingdom) Harry Beaton | Rotterdam (NED) | August 28, 1895 |
| World Record | 10.8 | (Sweden) Harald Anderson-Arbin | Helsingborg (SWE) | August 9, 1896 |
| World Record | 10.8 | (Sweden) Isaac Westergren | Gävle (SWE) | September 11, 1898 |
| World Record | 10.8 | (Sweden) Isaac Westergren | Gävle (SWE) | September 10, 1899 |
| Olympic Record | 11.8 | (United States) Thomas Burke | Athens (GRE) | April 6, 1896 (NS) |

Arthur Duffey in the first heat of the first round and Walter Tewksbury in the second heat of the first round set new Olympic records with 11.4 seconds. In the third heat of the first round Frank Jarvis equalled the unofficial world record with 10.8 seconds. In the second semifinal Tewksbury also equalled the world record with 10.8 seconds.

== Competition format ==
The competition consisted of four rounds: heats, semifinals, a repechage, and a final. The top two runners in each of the six heats advanced to the semifinals. Those 12 men were divided into 3 semifinals of 4 runners each. The 1st-place runner in each semifinal advanced directly to the final, the 2nd and 3rd place runners went to the repechage, and the 4th-place finisher was eliminated. In the 6-man repechage, only the winner advanced to the final and everyone else was eliminated.

== Schedule ==
| Date | Time | Round |
|---|---|---|
| Saturday, 14 July 1900 | 11:15 | First round Semifinals; Repechage; Final |

== Results ==
=== First round ===
In the first round, there were six heats. The top two runners in each advanced to the semifinals.

==== Heat 1 ====
Duffey was a metre ahead of Moloney at the finish.

| Rank | Athlete | Nation | Time | Notes |
|---|---|---|---|---|
| 1 | Arthur Duffey | United States | 11.4 | Q, OR |
| 2 | Frederick Moloney | United States | 11.5 | Q |
| 3 | Václav Nový | Bohemia | Unknown | |

==== Heat 2 ====
Tewksbury beat McClain by six inches, with Koppán far back in third being eliminated.

| Rank | Athlete | Nation | Time | Notes |
|---|---|---|---|---|
| 1 | Walter Tewksbury | United States | 11.4 | Q, =OR |
| 2 | Thaddeus McClain | United States | 11.4 | Q |
| 3 | Pál Koppán | Hungary | Unknown | |

==== Heat 3 ====
The fastest of the preliminary heats featured two of the eventual medallists; Jarvis won by a metre and equalled the world record.

| Rank | Athlete | Nation | Time | Notes |
|---|---|---|---|---|
| 1 | Frank Jarvis | United States | 10.8 | Q, =WR |
| 2 | Stan Rowley | Australia | 10.9 | Q |
| 3 | Umberto Colombo | Italy | Unknown | |
| 4 | Julius Keyl | Germany | Unknown | |

==== Heat 4 ====
Leiblee beat Doerry by a yard.

| Rank | Athlete | Nation | Time | Notes |
|---|---|---|---|---|
| 1 | Clark Leiblee | United States | 11.4 | Q |
| 2 | Kurt Doerry | Germany | 11.5 | Q |
| 3 | Johannes Gandil | Denmark | Unknown | |

==== Heat 5 ====
The fifth heat was the only one that was not won by an American, with Pritchard beating Minahan by half a yard.

| Rank | Athlete | Nation | Time | Notes |
|---|---|---|---|---|
| 1 | Norman Pritchard | India | 11.4 | Q |
| 2 | Edmund Minahan | United States | 11.5 | Q |
| 3 | Ernő Schubert | Hungary | Unknown | |
| 4 | Isaac Westergren | Sweden | Unknown | |

==== Heat 6 ====
In an all-American heat, Burroughs defeated Boardman by a yard; Slack, in third, was the only American to be eliminated in the first round.

| Rank | Athlete | Nation | Time | Notes |
|---|---|---|---|---|
| 1 | Charles Burroughs | United States | 11.4 | Q |
| 2 | Dixon Boardman | United States | 11.5 | Q |
| 3 | Henry Slack | United States | Unknown | |

=== Semifinals ===
There were three semifinals, each with four runners. The top runner in each of the semifinals advanced to the final, while the second and third place runners competed in the repechage. The winner of the six-runner repechage advanced to the final as well.

==== Semifinal 1 ====
Duffey dropped almost half a second from his preliminary heat time to beat Rowley by five feet. Burroughs beat Boardman to stay in contention via the repechage.

| Rank | Athlete | Nation | Time | Notes |
|---|---|---|---|---|
| 1 | Arthur Duffey | United States | 11.0 | Q |
| 2 | Stan Rowley | Australia | 11.2 | R |
| 3 | Charles Burroughs | United States | Unknown | R |
| 4 | Dixon Boardman | United States | Unknown | |

==== Semifinal 2 ====
Tewksbury equalled the world record, the second runner to accomplish that at the Paris Games, to beat Leiblee by six inches, while Doerry pulled up lame.

| Rank | Athlete | Nation | Time | Notes |
|---|---|---|---|---|
| 1 | Walter Tewksbury | United States | 10.8 | Q, =WR |
| 2 | Clark Leiblee | United States | 10.9 | R |
| 3 | Frederick Moloney | United States | Unknown | R |
| — | Kurt Doerry | Germany | DNF | |

==== Semifinal 3 ====
Jarvis won by a yard over McClain: McClain and Pritchard were relegated to the repechage, with Minahan being eliminated.

| Rank | Athlete | Nation | Time | Notes |
|---|---|---|---|---|
| 1 | Frank Jarvis | United States | 11.2 | Q |
| 2 | Thaddeus McClain | United States | 11.3 | R |
| 3 | Norman Pritchard | India | Unknown | R |
| 4 | Edmund Minahan | United States | Unknown | |

=== Repechage ===
The repechage was a very close race, with Rowley defeating Pritchard by two inches to advance to the final.

| Rank | Athlete | Nation | Time | Notes |
|---|---|---|---|---|
| 1 | Stan Rowley | Australia | 11.0 | Q |
| 2 | Norman Pritchard | India | 11.0 | |
| 3 | Clark Leiblee | United States | Unknown | |
| 4–6 | Charles Burroughs | United States | Unknown | |
| 4–6 | Thaddeus McClain | United States | Unknown | |
| 4–6 | Frederick Moloney | United States | Unknown | |

=== Final ===
Duffey got away to an early lead, but pulled a tendon at the 50 meter mark. Jarvis beat Tewksbury by two feet, with Rowley half a yard behind.

| Rank | Athlete | Nation | Time |
|---|---|---|---|
| 1st place, gold medalist(s) | Frank Jarvis | United States | 11.0 |
| 2nd place, silver medalist(s) | Walter Tewksbury | United States | 11.1 |
| 3rd place, bronze medalist(s) | Stan Rowley | Australia | 11.2 |
| — | Arthur Duffey | United States | DNF |

== Sources ==
- International Olympic Committee.
- De Wael, Herman. Herman's Full Olympians: "Athletics 1900". Accessed 18 March 2006. Available electronically at.
- Mallon, Bill (1998). The 1900 Olympic Games, Results for All Competitors in All Events, with Commentary. Jefferson, North Carolina: McFarland & Company, Inc., Publishers. ISBN 0-7864-0378-0.
