= Kurt Doerry =

German track and field athlete

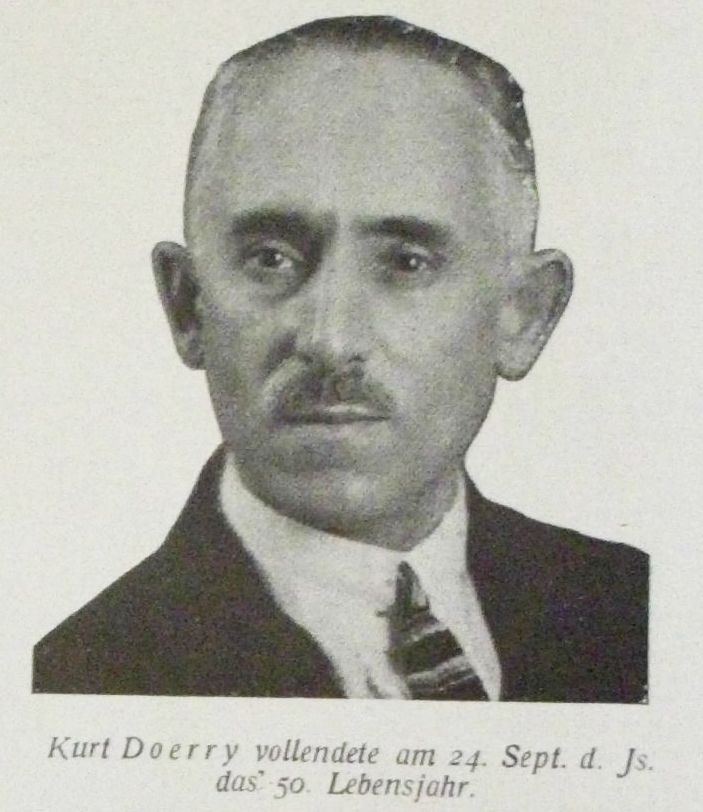
- Doerry in 1924

Personal information
- Born: 24 September 1874 Wilhelmshaven, German Empire
- Died: 4 January 1947 (aged 72) Berlin, Allied-occupied Germany

Sport
- Sport: Sprinting
- Events: 100m, 110m hurdles, 400m

Kurt Wilhelm Doerry (24 September 1874 – 4 January 1947) was a German track and field athlete. He competed at the 1896 Summer Olympics in Athens and the 1900 Summer Olympics held in Paris.

Doerry was 21 years old when he competed at the 1896 Summer Olympics, there he entered three events, in the 100 metres he finished fifth in his heat, so he did not qualify for the final. In the 400 metres, again he failed to finish in the top two in his heat so did not qualify for the final, his final event was the 110 metres hurdles, and yet again he finished outside the top two and didn't progress to the final.

Later in 1896, Doerry won the 100 and 200 metres at the German Championships, and in 1899 he won the German titles in the 200 and 400 metres.

Doerry also competed at the 1900 Summer Olympics held in Paris, France, he entered the 100 metres, in the first round he finished second behind American Clark Leiblee so qualified for semi-final, in the semi-final he didn't finish the race.

Apart from athletics, he was also a figure skater, cyclist and tennis player, as well as an international hockey player and a boxing referee.

In 1909, Doerry was a founding member of the Deutscher Hockey-Bund and was its first president until 1914.

Doerry was also a journalist and author and worked many years for German newspaper Sport Im Bild and would become editor-in-chief until World War II, he would also write many books concerning an athletic theme.
