= Frank Jarvis =

Frank Jarvis may refer to:

- Frank Jarvis (actor) (1941–2010), British actor
- Frank Jarvis (athlete) (1878–1933), American Olympic sprinter
