= Frank Jarvis (athlete) =

American athlete

Personal information
- Born: August 31, 1878 California, Pennsylvania, USA
- Died: June 2, 1933 (aged 54) Sewickley, Pennsylvania, USA

Sport
- Sport: Athletics
- Event: Sprints
- Club: Princeton Tigers
Medal record
Men's athletics
Representing United States
Olympic Games
Gold medal – first place	1900 Paris	100 metres

Frank Washington Jarvis (August 31, 1878 in California, Pennsylvania – June 2, 1933 in Sewickley, Pennsylvania) was an American sprinter, the 1900 Olympic 100 m champion, and a triple jumper.

== Biography ==
Jarvis, an AAU champion in the 100 yard race, was among the pre-race favorites for the 100 m at the 1900 Summer Olympics in Paris, but the hot favorite was American Arthur Duffey, who had just beaten Jarvis at the British AAA Championships in the 100 yard event at the 1900 AAA Championships prior to the Games.

In the heats, however, Jarvis and another American, Walter Tewksbury, posted times of 10.8, equaling the world record. All three Americans qualified for the final, complemented by Stan Rowley of Australia. After a close first half of the final race, the leader, Duffey, pulled a muscle, fell, and retired from the race, and Jarvis won.

At the same Olympics, Jarvis also competed in the triple jump and the standing triple jump (with no run-up), but did not achieve top classifications.

After his running career, Jarvis became a lawyer.

== See also ==
- List of Princeton University Olympians
