= Australia at the 1900 Summer Olympics =

- IOC code: AUS
- NOC: Australian Olympic Committee

in Paris, France 14 May, 1900 – 28 October, 1900
- Competitors: 2 in 2 sports and 5 events
- Medals Ranked 18th: Gold 0 Silver 0 Bronze 3 Total 3

Summer Olympics appearances (overview)
- 1896; 1900; 1904; 1908; 1912; 1920; 1924; 1928; 1932; 1936; 1948; 1952; 1956; 1960; 1964; 1968; 1972; 1976; 1980; 1984; 1988; 1992; 1996; 2000; 2004; 2008; 2012; 2016; 2020; 2024; 2028

Other related appearances
- 1906 Intercalated Games –––– Australasia (1908–1912)

Australia competed at the 1900 Summer Olympics in Paris, France. Most Olympic historians keep Australian records at early Olympics separate from those of the United Kingdom, although the British colonies in Australia did not federate until 1901.

Australia was officially represented only by two athletes, both of whom won a medal in each event in which they competed. Frederick Lane won two gold medals in swimming and Stan Rowley won a gold medal (as part of a mixed team with Great Britain) and three bronze medals in athletics.

Professional shooter Donald Mackintosh competed in two pigeon-shooting events, which are now regarded as non-Olympic. Additionally, John Howard Taylor, a former member of the parliament of Western Australia, won a sailing gold medal, but is classed by Olympedia as a representative of Great Britain.

== Disputed country attribution ==
Frederick Lane's nationality at the 1900 Paris Olympics is disputed. He was an Australian national although represented the Amateur Swimming Association of Great Britain and also swam for a British club, the Blackpool Swimming Club.

Since 2024, participation and medals have been attributed according to the national affiliation of the club or team represented by the athlete, reinstating the International Olympic Committee's (IOC) original policy for the early Olympics (1896–1904). As a representative of a British club, Lane's participation and medals were attributed to Great Britain.

== Medalists ==
The following competitors won medals at the games. In the discipline sections below, the medalists' names are bolded.

Medals awarded to participants of mixed-NOC teams are represented in italics. These medals are not counted towards the individual NOC medal tally.

Medal	Name	Sport	Event	Date	Reallocated to
Gold	Stan Rowley	Athletics	5000 m team race	July 22	Great Britain^{†}
Gold	Frederick Lane	Swimming	200 m freestyle	August 12	Great Britain
Gold	Frederick Lane	Swimming	200 m obstacle event	August 12	Great Britain
Bronze	Stan Rowley	Athletics	60 m	July 15	no reallocation
Bronze	Stan Rowley	Athletics	100 m	July 14	no reallocation
Bronze	Stan Rowley	Athletics	200 m	July 22	no reallocation

^{†} Since 2024, teams representing a club have been attributed to the club's country. Therefore, the gold medal has been attributed to Great Britain by the IOC. (Note: Until 2024, the IOC classified all teams composed of athletes from different countries in the early Modern Olympic Games as mixed teams (IOC code ZZX), regardless of whether they represented an established club. Since 2024, teams representing a club have been attributed to the club's country, even if they included foreign athletes. Only ad hoc teams formed solely for the Olympic Games are now classified as mixed teams.)

Medals by sport
Sport	1st place, gold medalist(s)	2nd place, silver medalist(s)	3rd place, bronze medalist(s)	Total
Athletics	0	0	3	**3**
Swimming	2	0	0	**2**
Total	2	0	3	5

=== Multiple medalists ===
The following competitors won multiple medals at the 1900 Olympic Games.

Name	Medal	Sport	Event
Frederick Lane	Gold; Gold	Swimming	200 metre freestyle 200 metre obstacle event
Stan Rowley	Bronze; Bronze; Bronze	Athletics	60 metres 100 metres 200 metres

== Competitors ==
The following is the list of number of competitors in the Games.

Sport	Men	Women	Total
Athletics	1	0	1
Swimming	1	0	1
Total	2	0	2

== Swimming ==
One swimmer, (Frederick Lane) represented Australia in 1900. It was the nation's debut appearance in the sport. Lane won the 200 metre freestyle and obstacle races, both on the same day. He did not receive gold medals, but instead received bronze sculptures of a horse and peasant girl respectively. He was also the favourite for the 100 metre freestyle, but this event was cancelled.

Athlete	Event	Semi-final		Final	
Athlete	Event	Time	Rank	Time	Rank
Frederick Lane	200 m freestyle	2:59.0	1 Q	2:25.2	1st place, gold medalist(s)
Frederick Lane	200 m obstacle event	3:04.0	1 Q	2:38.4	1st place, gold medalist(s)

== Athletics ==
Rowley was Australia's only competitor in athletics. It was Australia's second appearance in the sport. He entered the three sprint events, taking the bronze medal in each of the three. Rowley also joined the Great Britain team in the 5-man team race, as the British squad had only 4 members. The 5 kilometres of the race was much further than Rowley was used to racing. After the first lap of the track, he injured his foot and began to walk. When the last of the other nine competitors (the United Kingdom and France were the only nations to send teams) finished, Rowley was still 1500 metres from the finish; officials allowed him to retire and claim 10th place at that point.

Rowley's three individual medals put him, and Australia, in ninth place on the athletics leaderboard.

Athlete	Event	Heat		Semifinal		Repechage		Final	
Athlete	Event	Result	Rank	Result	Rank	Result	Rank	Result	Rank
Stan Rowley	60 m	7.3	2 Q	—N/a				7.2	3rd place, bronze medalist(s)
Stan Rowley	100 m	10.9	2 Q	11.2	2 R	11.0	2	11.2	3rd place, bronze medalist(s)
Stan Rowley	200 m	25.0	1 Q	—N/a				22.9	3rd place, bronze medalist(s)
Stan Rowley	400 m	DNS		—N/a				Did not advance	
Amateur Athletic Association of England (GBR); Charles Bennett (GBR); John Rimmer (GBR); Sidney Robinson (GBR); Stan Rowley (AUS); Alfred Tysoe (GBR)	5000 m team race	—N/a						26 points	1st place, gold medalist(s)

== Non-Olympic events ==
=== Shooting ===
Donald Mackintosh was a professional shooter from Melbourne. He was travelling through Europe competing in a series of traditional competitions. He won the live game shooting (Prix Centenaire de Paris) with 22 consecutive kills of live pigeons, one more than Marquis de Villancosa of Spain. He finished in the joint third position alongside Crittenden Robinson of the United States in the live pigeon shooting (Grand Prix d'Exposition) with 18, behind the winner Leon de Lunden, who scored 21. Mackintosh' status has often been confused, as some historians were under the impression that game-shooting was an archery contest. The IOC does not consider either event Olympic.
