= Julius Keyl =

German sprinter (1877–1959)

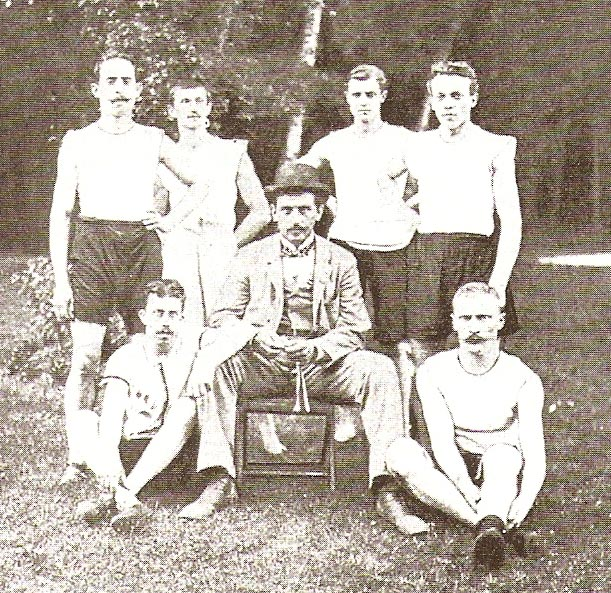
- Full name: Julius Christian Keyl
- Born: 8 December 1877 Munich, German Empire
- Died: 10 November 1959 (aged 81) Munich, West Germany

Gymnastics career
- Discipline: Men's artistic gymnastics
- Country represented: Germany
- Club: Männer-Turn-Verein München von 1879

Julius Christian Keyl (8 December 1877 – 10 November 1959) was a German artistic gymnast and track and field athletewho competed in the 1900 Summer Olympics and in the 1906 Summer Olympics.

Keyl competed for the MTV Munich Club, and it was they who sent him to the 1900 Summer Olympics in Paris; he only competed in the 100 metres, where he finished last out of the four starters in his heat, so he didn't advance to the next round.

Back home in Germany, Keyl became the 1902 and 1904 National Champion in the 100 metres, in 1902 with the help from his brother Walter, they broke the World Record twice in the 4 x 100 metres relay, and in 1904 he broke the German 110 metres hurdles record when he ran it in 16 seconds.

Keyl also competed in the 1906 Intercalated Games in Athens, Greece, but not in athletics; this time he competed in the gymnastics. He was part of the All-Round Team that finished in fifth place.

As well as studying law and becoming a practicing lawyer, from 1901 to 1919 he was head of his local football team MTV 1879 München, this was just after 11 players split from his team to form Bayern Munich, he was also president of the Munich Football Association between 1904 and 1910, before becoming president of the Technical Commission of the South German Football Association until 1922, when he then moved to the same position at the German Football Association until 1928.

In 1928, Keyl was part of the coaching team for the German football team competing at the 1928 Summer Olympics in Amsterdam. Keyl died in 1959 in his home city of Munich.
