= Cotton Minahan =

American athlete (1882–1958)

- Pitcher
- Born: December 10, 1882; Springfield, Ohio, U.S.
- Died: May 20, 1958 (aged 75); East Orange, New Jersey, U.S.
- Batted: Right Threw: Right

MLB debut
- April 21, 1907, for the Cincinnati Reds

Last MLB appearance
- May 15, 1907, for the Cincinnati Reds

MLB statistics
- Win–loss record: 0–2
- Earned run average: 1.29
- Strikeouts: 4
- Stats at Baseball Reference

Teams
- Cincinnati Reds (1907)

Edmund Joseph "Cotton" Minahan (December 10, 1882 – May 20, 1958) was an American professional baseball player, and American track and field athlete who competed at the 1900 Summer Olympics in Paris, France.

== Early life and education ==
Minahan was born in Springfield, Ohio, and was one of 10 brothers and sisters, while young his family moved to Orange, New Jersey, and was educated at Georgetown University and Manhattan College, he competed for the Georgetown Hoyas.

== Athletics ==
In June 1900, Minahan set sail for England with fellow club teammates William Holland and Arthur Duffey to compete in the Amateur Athletic Association of England Games, then they headed to Paris to compete in the 1900 Summer Olympics. Minahan competed in the 60 metres event, placing fourth overall. He placed second in his initial heat with an unknown time (though the winner ran it in 7.0 seconds) before coming in fourth of four in the final with an estimated time of 7.2 seconds.

Minahan also went on to run in the 100 metres, finishing in 12th or 13th place overall. He took second in his heat behind Norman Pritchard to advance to the semifinals, but placed fourth in his semi final so didn't advance to the final or the repechage.

== Baseball ==
Minahan played as a right-handed pitcher for the 1907 season with the Cincinnati Reds. For his career, he compiled a 0–2 record, with a 1.29 earned run average, and 4 strikeouts in 14 innings pitched. He was the first athlete in history to have been an Olympian in a non-baseball sport and also play in major league baseball, preceding Jim Thorpe and Eddy Alvarez.

== Death ==
Minahan died on May 20, 1958, in East Orange, New Jersey, at the age of 75.
