= Athletics at the 1896 Summer Olympics – Men's 400 metres =

Men's 400 metres at the Games of the I Olympiad
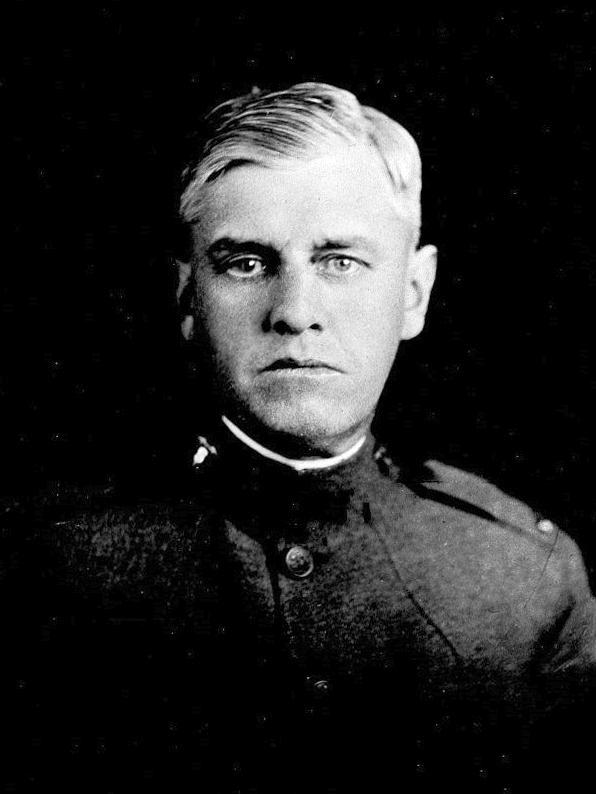
- Thomas Burke (1918)
- Venue: Panathinaiko Stadium
- Dates: 6 April 1896 (semifinals); 7 April 1896 (final)
- Competitors: 7 from 4 nations
- Winning time: 54.2 OR

Medalists
1st place, gold medalist(s)		Thomas Burke	United States
2nd place, silver medalist(s)		Herbert Jamison	United States
3rd place, bronze medalist(s)		Charles Gmelin	Great Britain

The men's 400 metres race was the second-shortest of the flat-track events on the Athletics at the 1896 Summer Olympics programme. The competition's preliminary round was the last held on the first day, 6 April. The competitors were split into two groups. The top two runners in each heat advanced to the final, which was held on the second day, 7 April.

7 athletes from 4 nations competed. 5 of those athletes were also in the 100 metres.

== Background ==
Thomas Burke of the United States and Edgar Bredin of Great Britain were the "two best one-lap runners in 1896"; Burke came to Athens, but Bredin did not (having become a professional earlier that year). Bredin was the co-holder of the unofficial world record at 48.5 seconds (440 yards). Burke had beaten Bredin in 1895.

== Competition format ==
The 400 metres consisted of two rounds: heats and a final. Each race was "slightly over one lap in length, with no lanes to separate the runners." Two heats were held, with 4 runners in one and 3 runners in the other. The top 2 runners in each heat advanced to the final.

The track was 330 metres in circumference (unlike modern tracks which are 400 metres), so the race was slightly more than one lap. The track had very sharp turns and was made of loose cinders, making running difficult. Runners turned clockwise rather than the current counterclockwise turns.

== Records ==
World record	Edgar Bredin (GBR)	48.5(y)(u)	London, United Kingdom	22 June 1895
Olympic record	New event	n/a	n/a	n/a

Jamison set the initial Olympic record of 56.8 seconds in the first heat; Burke beat it in the final at 54.2 seconds.

== Schedule ==
The precise times of the events are not recorded. For the first round, the heats were the final event of the day on Monday; the "sun was setting" and "the air had become decidedly cold." The final was held during the afternoon session on Tuesday, which began at 2:30 p.m.; the hurdles and long jumping competitions took place before the 400 metres final.

Date		Round
Gregorian	Julian	Round
Monday, 6 April 1896	Monday, 25 March 1896	Semifinals
Tuesday, 7 April 1896	Tuesday, 26 March 1896	Final

== Results ==
=== Semifinals ===
The semifinals were held on 6 April. The top two placers in each of the two groups advanced.

==== Semifinal 1 ====
Jamison won by 13½ yards, with Hofmann and Grisel both having to run 401.83 metres after being penalized for false starts. The final positions of Grisel and Dörry are unclear. Jamison set the initial Olympic record at 56.8 seconds, which would hold only until the next day.

Rank	Athlete	Nation	Time	Notes
1	Herbert Jamison	United States	56.8	Q, OR
2	Fritz Hofmann	Germany	58.6	Q
3–4	Kurt Doerry	Germany	Unknown	
3–4	Adolphe Grisel	France	Unknown	

==== Semifinal 2 ====
Burke won by 15 yards, despite suffering fatigue from already having run in the heats of the 100 metres, with Gmelin beating Reichel by 12 yards for second to qualify for the final.

Rank	Athlete	Nation	Time	Notes
1	Thomas Burke	United States	58.4	Q
2	Charles Gmelin	Great Britain	1:00.5	Q
3	Frantz Reichel	France	1:02.3	

=== Final ===
Burke led from start to finish to beat Jamison by eight yards, with both Americans finishing 20 yards clear of their opponents: Gmelin beat Hofmann by a foot for third place.

Rank	Athlete	Nation	Time	Notes
1st place, gold medalist(s)	Thomas Burke	United States	54.2	OR
2nd place, silver medalist(s)	Herbert Jamison	United States	55.2	
3rd place, bronze medalist(s)	Charles Gmelin	Great Britain	56.7	
4	Fritz Hofmann	Germany	56.7	

== Results summary ==
Rank	Athlete	Nation	Semifinal	Final	Notes
1st place, gold medalist(s)	Thomas Burke	United States	58.4	54.2	OR
2nd place, silver medalist(s)	Herbert Jamison	United States	56.8	55.2	
3rd place, bronze medalist(s)	Charles Gmelin	Great Britain	1:00.5	56.7	
4	Fritz Hofmann	Germany	58.6	56.7	
5	Frantz Reichel	France	1:02.3	Did not advance	
6	Kurt Doerry	Germany	Unknown	Did not advance	3rd–4th in semifinal
6	Adolphe Grisel	France	Unknown	Did not advance	3rd–4th in semifinal
