= Athletics at the 1900 Summer Olympics – Men's 60 metres =

Men's 60 metres at the Games of the II Olympiad
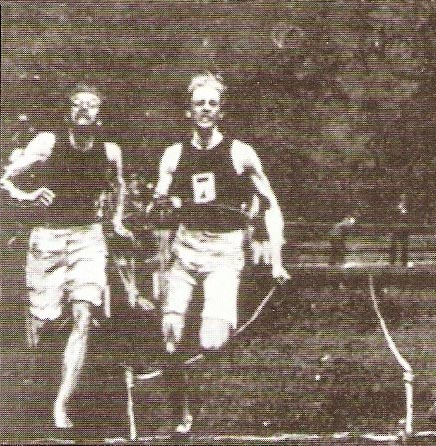
- Finish of the final
- Venue: Bois de Boulogne
- Date: July 15, 1900
- Competitors: 10 from 6 nations
- Winning time: 7.0 OR

Medalists
1st place, gold medalist(s)		Alvin Kraenzlein; United States
2nd place, silver medalist(s)		Walter Tewksbury; United States
3rd place, bronze medalist(s)		Stan Rowley; Australia

The men's 60 metres was the shortest of the track races at the 1900 Summer Olympics in Paris, which was the first time the event was held. It was held on 15 July 1900. 10 athletes from 6 nations competed. Five preliminary heats were scheduled, though only two were actually held. The top two athletes from each of the heats advanced to the final, resulting in a final race that featured three United States runners and an Australian. Hurdle specialist Alvin Kraenzlein of the United States won the event, with his countryman Walter Tewksbury in second and Australian Stan Rowley earning bronze.

== Background ==
This was the first time the event was held; it would be held again only in 1904 before being discontinued. 110 metres hurdles champion Alvin Kraenzlein, 200 metres and 400 metres hurdles champion Walter Tewksbury, and 100 metres and 200 metres bronze medalist Stan Rowley were among the entrants.

Australia, France, Hungary, India, Sweden, and the United States competed in the debut of the event.

== Records ==
World bests were not recognized until 1966.

As this was a new event, there was no standing Olympic record: Alvin Kraenzlein set the initial record with 7.0 seconds in the first semifinal, then equalled it in the final.

== Competition format ==
The competition consisted of two rounds: semifinals and a final. The top two runners in each of the two semifinals advanced to the final.

== Schedule ==
Date	Time	Round
Sunday, 15 July 1900	14:00; 14:45	Semifinals; Final

== Results ==
=== Semifinals ===
==== Semifinal 1 ====
Minahan was about half a yard behind Kraenzlein, with Pritchard a yard behind him.

Rank	Athlete	Nation	Time	Notes
1	Alvin Kraenzlein	United States	7.0	Q, OR
2	Edmund Minahan	United States	7.0	Q
3	Norman Pritchard	India	7.1	
4–5	Adolphe Klingelhoefer	France	Unknown	
4–5	Isaac Westergren	Sweden	Unknown	

==== Semifinal 2 ====
Tewksbury beat Rowley by a foot.

Rank	Athlete	Nation	Time	Notes
1	Walter Tewksbury	United States	7.2	Q
2	Stan Rowley	Australia	7.3	Q
3	William Holland	United States	Unknown	
4–5	Pál Koppán	Hungary	Unknown	
4–5	Ernő Schubert	Hungary	Unknown	

=== Final ===
The 60 metres final was a close race, with the two top Americans being separated by four inches and Rowley half a yard behind. It was each of the runners' second time running the 60 in less than an hour, as the final was held almost immediately after the preliminary heats.

Rank	Athlete	Nation	Time	Notes
1st place, gold medalist(s)	Alvin Kraenzlein	United States	7.0	=OR
2nd place, silver medalist(s)	Walter Tewksbury	United States	7.1	
3rd place, bronze medalist(s)	Stan Rowley	Australia	7.2	
4	Edmund Minahan	United States	7.2	

== Sources ==
- International Olympic Committee.
- De Wael, Herman. Herman's Full Olympians: "Athletics 1900". Accessed 18 March 2006. Available electronically at.
- Mallon, Bill (1998). The 1900 Olympic Games, Results for All Competitors in All Events, with Commentary. Jefferson, North Carolina: McFarland & Company, Inc., Publishers. ISBN 0-7864-0378-0.
