= Isaac Westergren =

Swedish sprinter (1875–1950)

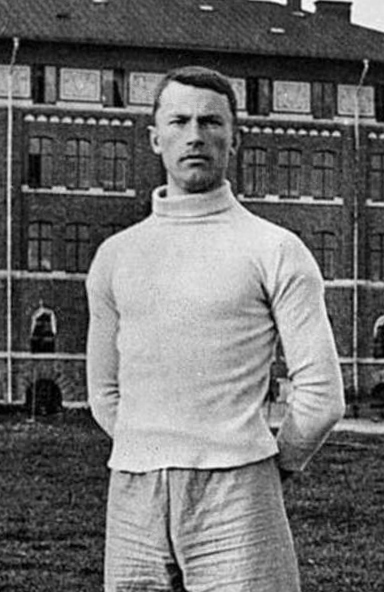
- Isaac Westergren c. 1898

Personal information
- Born: 12 July 1875 Gävle, Sweden
- Died: 16 October 1950 (aged 73) Leksand, Sweden

Sport
- Sport: Athletics
- Event: 100 m
- Club: IFK Gävle

Achievements and titles
- Personal best: 100 m – 10.8 (1898)

Johan Isaac Westergren (12 July 1875 – 16 October 1950) was a Swedish sprinter. He competed at the 1900 Summer Olympics in the 60 m and 100 m events, but failed to reach the finals. He was also Chairperson of the Swedish Ice Hockey Association between November 1922 and November 1924, making him the first person on that position.
