= Clark Leiblee =

American track athlete (1876–1917)

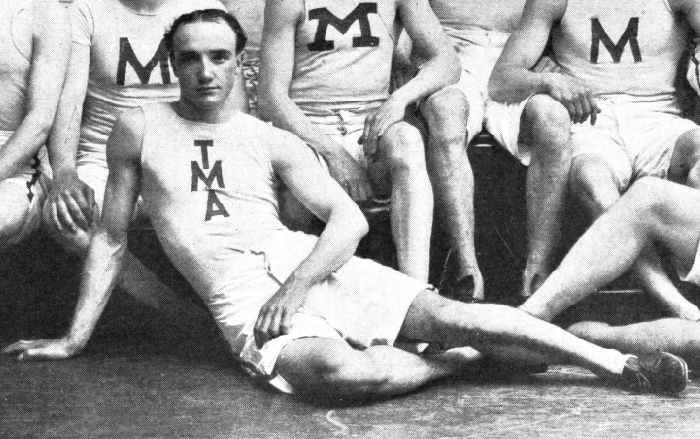
Clark Leiblee, University of Michigan

Clark Moses Leiblee (November 2, 1877 – August 20, 1917) was an American track and field athlete who competed at the 1900 Summer Olympics in Paris, France. He also competed in intercollegiate track for the University of Michigan. He was also on the roster of the 1899 Michigan Wolverines football team as a halfback.

== Biography ==
He was born on November 2, 1877, in Troy, Pennsylvania.

Leiblee competed in the 100 metres event, placing eighth overall. He won his first-round heat with a time of 11.4 seconds before finishing his semifinal heat in second place to Walter Tewksbury (who matched the world record of 10.8 seconds in the race). This put Leiblee in the repechage; a third-place finish in the six-man field put him in eighth place overall.

He died in Tipton, Indiana on August 20, 1917.
