= Stan Rowley =

Australian sprinter

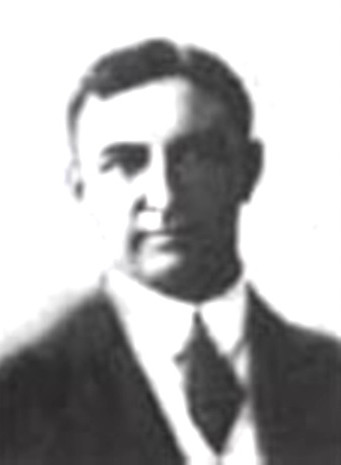

Medal record

Men's athletics

Representing Great Britain
Gold medal – first place	1900 Paris	5000 metre team race

Representing Australia
Bronze medal – third place	1900 Paris	60 metres
Bronze medal – third place	1900 Paris	100 metres
Bronze medal – third place	1900 Paris	200 metres

Stanley Rupert Rowley (11 September 1876 – 1 April 1924) was an Australian sprinter who won four medals at the 1900 Summer Olympics. He was born in Young, New South Wales and died in Manly, New South Wales.

== Early life ==
Rowley was born on 11 September 1876 in Young, New South Wales. He was the son of Tempest Jane (née Hodge) and William Rowley; his father worked as a confectioner and hotel-keeper. He was orphaned in 1884 and subsequently lived with an aunt at Croydon, along with a brother and sister. He attended Sydney Boys' High School.

== Biography ==
In 1900 he won three of his four medals for Australia and one for Great Britain in a British team, when he competed as a fifth member with four runners from Great Britain and Ireland.

Starting for Australia in the short sprint events at the 1900 Olympics, he won bronze medals over 60 metres, 100 and 200 metres. His first event was the 100 metres on 14 July, and after finishing second in the semi-final behind Arthur Duffey, he had to go through a repechage, which he won with 11.0 seconds, a few inches ahead of Norman Pritchard of India who was consequently eliminated. In the final race Rowley was unable to match this time and finished in 11.2 seconds to win a bronze medal behind silver medalist Walter Tewksbury, who ran in 11.1s. The 60 metres race on 15 July saw him finish in 7.2 seconds, less than half a metre behind gold medal winner Alvin Kraenzlein and Tewksbury, who won another silver medal. Rowley and Tewksbury would meet one final time, in the 200 metres race held on 22 July. Rowley managed to beat his rival in the heats, but Tewksbury won the final race by a clear margin. Rowley, who finished in 22.9 seconds, also lost to Norman Pritchard and received his third bronze medal.

Subsequently, Rowley was persuaded by his English athlete friends to participate on the British team which faced the French team in the 5000 metre team race. The participation was in order, as Australia was still a part of the British Empire and as well as mixed teams were allowed in 1896, 1900 and 1904. The British team needed a fifth runner, and were confident that they could win regardless of how well the fifth runner performed. Thus, the sprinter Rowley, without any experience in longer races, was drafted to fill the quota. Following the first lap Rowley began walking and trailed behind everyone. After the ninth runner crossed the finishing line, Rowley was the only athlete still going and therefore would receive tenth place were he to finish. The race officials decided that it would be pointless for him to walk the final 1500 metres and awarded him a tenth place at the end of his seventh lap. Nonetheless, the British team, including Rowley, beat the French team by three points and won the gold medal.

Rowley also won the national championships over 100 and 220 yards in 1898 and 1900. Also he won both these events at the Australasian Championships in 1897 and 1899.

He attended Sydney Boys High School from 1890.
