= Charles Burroughs (athlete) =

American sprinter

Charles Lindsay Burroughs (December 3, 1876 – November 24, 1902) was an American track and field athlete who competed at the 1900 Summer Olympics in Paris, France. He was born in Washington County, Iowa and died in Paris.

Burroughs competed in the 100 metres event, placing between 9th and 11th overall. He won his first-round heat with a time of 11.4 seconds, but finished third in his semifinal to be relegated to the repechage. There, he finished in the bottom half of the six-man field and did not qualify for the final.
