= Herbert Jamison =

American sprinter

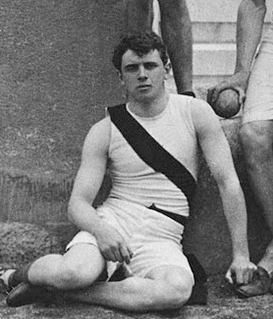
- Herbert Jamison at the 1896 Olympics

Personal information
- Born: September 17, 1875 Peoria, Illinois, United States
- Died: June 22, 1938 (aged 62) Peoria, Illinois, United States
- Education: Princeton University
- Height: 1.73 m (5 ft 8 in)
- Weight: 69 kg (152 lb)

Sport
- Sport: Athletics
- Event: 400 m
- Club: Princeton Tigers

Achievements and titles
- Personal best: 400 m – 55.2 (1896)
Medal record
Representing the United States
Olympic Games
Silver medal – second place	1896 Athens	400 m

Herbert Brotherson Jamison (September 17, 1875 – June 22, 1938) was an American sprinter who won a silver medal in the 400 m at the 1896 Summer Olympics. His favorite event, 200 m, was not yet part of the Olympics.

In 1897 Jamison graduated from Princeton University and joined the family business in agriculture. Seven years later he founded an insurance agency in his native Peoria, Illinois, which he ran until his death.

== See also ==
- List of Princeton University Olympians
