= Charles Burroughs (academic) =

American academic

Charles Burroughs is the Elsie B. Smith Professor of Liberal Arts in the Department of Classics at the Case Western Reserve University. He was Interim Chair of the Department. He is an art historian specialising in late- and post-medieval Europe. He is an alumnus of Balliol College, Oxford University and the Warburg Institute, University of London and was previously Professor of Art History, Director of CEMERS at Binghamton University.

== Selected publications ==
- Burroughs, C. (1990). From signs to design: Environmental process and reform in early Renaissance Rome, Cambridge, Mass: MIT Press.
