= Thomas Burke (sprinter) =

American sprinter (1875–1929)

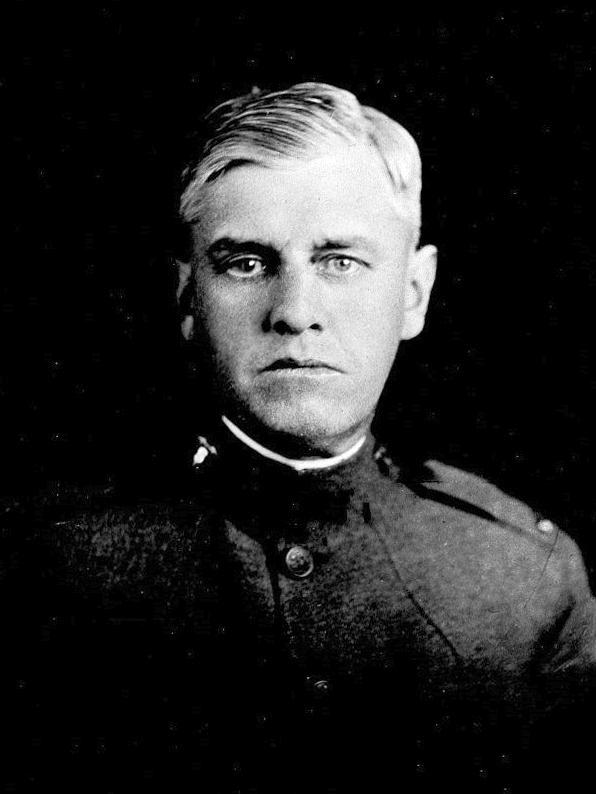
- Burke in 1918

Personal information
- Born: Thomas Edmund Burke; January 15, 1875 Boston, Massachusetts, U.S.
- Died: February 14, 1929 (aged 54) Boston, Massachusetts, U.S.
- Education: Boston University School of Law
- Height: 6 ft 0 in (183 cm)
- Weight: 146 lb (66 kg)

Sport
- Sport: Athletics
- Event: 100-800 m
- Club: Boston Athletic Association

Achievements and titles
- Personal bests: 100 m – 11.2 (1895); 200 m – 22.6 (1897); 400 m – 48.5 (1896); 800 m – 1:55.9 (1897)
Medal record
Representing the United States
Olympic Games
Gold medal – first place	1896 Athens	100 m
Gold medal – first place	1896 Athens	400 m

Thomas Edmund Burke (January 15, 1875 – February 14, 1929) was an American sprinter. He was the first Olympic champion in the 100 and 400 meter sprint races.

== Biography ==
Burke was born in Massachusetts in 1875. He competed for the Suffolk Athletic Club in South Boston and the Boston Athletic Association (BAA).

Burke, a student at Boston University School of Law, was a reputed runner in the 400 meters and 440 yards, having won the AAU title (440 yards) in 1895. He had no such reputation for the first event he entered in the inaugural modern Olympic Games in Athens, 1896. With many top sprinters absent, Burke surprisingly won the 100 meters. He was also noted for his "crouch start", which was uncommon at that time but in standard use now. His time in the final was 12.0 seconds. In the preliminary heat, he had an even better time – 11.8 seconds.

At the same Olympics, Burke also won the 400 meters, his top event. His times for that event were 58.4 seconds in the preliminary heats and 54.2 seconds in the final, in both of which Burke finished first.

Later in his career, Burke specialized in the longer distances, winning IC4A titles in the 440 and 880 yards events. In 1897, he was one of the initiators of the annually held Boston Marathon, inspired by the success of the marathon event at the 1896 Olympics.

Burke later became a lawyer, but was also an athletics coach and a part-time journalist, writing for The Boston Journal and the Boston Post.

During World War I, at an age when most soldiers had long since retired from active duty, Burke earned his aviator’s wings at 43, making him the oldest man in the U.S. military to achieve this distinction. Burke died in 1929, aged 54.
