= Walter Tewksbury =

American track and field athlete

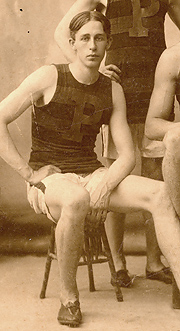
- Walter Tewksbury

Personal information
- National team: United States
- Born: March 21, 1876 Ashley, Pennsylvania, U.S.
- Died: April 24, 1968 (aged 92) Tunkhannock, Pennsylvania, U.S.
- Education: University of Pennsylvania
Medal record
Men's athletics
Representing the United States
Olympic Games
Gold medal – first place	1900 Paris	200 metres
Gold medal – first place	1900 Paris	400 metre hurdles
Silver medal – second place	1900 Paris	60 metres
Silver medal – second place	1900 Paris	100 metres
Bronze medal – third place	1900 Paris	200 metre hurdles

John Walter Beardsley Tewksbury (March 21, 1876 – April 24, 1968) was an American track and field athlete. At the 1900 Summer Olympics, he won five medals, including two golds.

== Biography ==
Born in Ashley, Pennsylvania, Tewksbury studied for a dental degree at the University of Pennsylvania, graduating in 1899. Running for the university team, he won the IC4A titles in the 110 and 220 y in 1898 and 1899.

After graduating in 1899, he headed for Paris to compete in the Olympic Games. Tewksbury entered in 5 events, but had strong competition, among others from fellow Penn student Alvin Kraenzlein. In the 100 m, Tewksbury equalled the world record in the semi-finals, but placed second in the final to Frank Jarvis. The following day, he took another second place, behind Kraenzlein, in the 60 m, before entering the 400 m hurdles.

At the time, this event had probably never been contested in the United States, but Tewksbury easily beat the local favourite for the 400 m hurdles title. The event was quite different from present day, as the hurdles were actually telephone poles laid over the track, and the final hurdles was a water barrier (like in the steeplechase). In the final of the 200 m hurdles, he placed third (with Kraenzlein the winner). The final of the 200 m was held a week later; in that race Tewksbury won his second individual Olympic gold, finishing immediately ahead of Norman Pritchard of India.

Tewksbury retired from sports to open a dental practice in Tunkhannock, Pennsylvania, in 1913. He died there on April 24, 1968.
