= Canada at the 1900 Summer Olympics =

- IOC code: CAN
- NOC: Canadian Olympic Committee

in Paris, France May 14, 1900 – October 28, 1900
- Competitors: 2 in 1 sport and 4 events
- Medals: Gold 0 Silver 0 Bronze 0 Total 0

Summer Olympics appearances (overview)
- 1900; 1904; 1908; 1912; 1920; 1924; 1928; 1932; 1936; 1948; 1952; 1956; 1960; 1964; 1968; 1972; 1976; 1980; 1984; 1988; 1992; 1996; 2000; 2004; 2008; 2012; 2016; 2020; 2024; 2028

Other related appearances
- 1906 Intercalated Games

Canada did not send an official national team to the 1900 Summer Olympics in Paris. However, it was the first Olympic Games in which Canadian athletes participated. Two Canadians competed—George Orton and Ronald J. MacDonald—though not under a formal national team banner, as those were not introduced until later Games. Orton became Canada’s first Olympic medalist and Olympic champion when he finished first in the 2500-metre steeplechase. He also placed third in the 400-metre hurdles and fifth in the 4000-metre steeplechase.

Orton's historical achievement was not immediately recognized. National teams did not exist in 1900, and because Orton competed for the University of Pennsylvania, he was initially assumed to be American. However, he remained a proud Canadian throughout his life.

== Disputed country attribution ==
Because both athletes represented American clubs, their participation and medals were initially attributed to the United States. Consequently, the International Olympic Committee (IOC) historically considered Canada a non-participant in the 1900 Games. Between 2021 and 2024, the IOC briefly adjusted its policy to attribute individual medals according to an athlete's nationality, retroactively assigning George Orton's medals to Canada, which is also supported by the Canadian Olympic Committee; it regards Orton as the first Canadian Olympic medalist.

However, in 2024, the IOC reinstated its original attribution policy for early Olympic Games (1896, 1900, and 1904), crediting participation and medals based on the national affiliation of the club represented rather than individual nationality. As a result of Orton representing the University of Pennsylvania, his medals were reallocated back to the United States and Canada is once again listed as a non-participant.

== Reallocated medals ==
Medal	Name	Sport	Event	Date	Reallocated to
Gold	George Orton	Athletics	2500 m steeplechase	July 15	United States
Bronze	George Orton	Athletics	400 m hurdles	July 15	United States

Medals by sport
Sport	1st place, gold medalist(s)	2nd place, silver medalist(s)	3rd place, bronze medalist(s)	Total
Athletics	1	0	1	2
Total	1	0	1	2

=== Multiple medalists ===
The following competitors won multiple medals at the 1900 Olympic Games.

Name	Medal	Sport	Event
George Orton	Gold; Bronze	Athletics	2500 m steeplechase 400 m hurdles

== Competitors ==
The following is the list of number of competitors in the Games.

Sport	Men	Women	Total
Athletics	2	0	2
Total	2	0	2

== Athletics ==
Both of Canada's competitors competed in athletics, with Orton taking a gold and a bronze medal to tie the nation for 4th on the athletics medal leaderboard.

Track & road events

Athlete	Event	Heat		Semifinal		Repechage		Final	
Athlete	Event	Time	Rank	Time	Rank	Time	Rank	Time	Rank
George Orton	1500 m	—N/a						DNS	
George Orton	110 m hurdles	DNS		—N/a				Did not advance	
George Orton	400 m hurdles	1:00.2	2 Q	—N/a				58.8	3rd place, bronze medalist(s)
George Orton	2500 m steeplechase	—N/a						7:34.4	1st place, gold medalist(s)
George Orton	4000 m steeplechase	—N/a						Unknown	5
Ronald MacDonald	Marathon	—N/a						Unknown	7
