= Canada at the Summer Olympics =

- IOC code: CAN
- NOC: Canadian Olympic Committee
- Website: www.olympic.ca (in English) www.olympique.ca(in French)
- Medals Ranked 19th: Gold 79 Silver 117 Bronze 155 Total 351

Summer Olympics appearances (overview)
- ~~1900~~; 1904; 1908; 1912; 1920; 1924; 1928; 1932; 1936; 1948; 1952; 1956; 1960; 1964; 1968; 1972; 1976; 1980; 1984; 1988; 1992; 1996; 2000; 2004; 2008; 2012; 2016; 2020; 2024; 2028

Other related appearances
- 1906 Intercalated Games

Flag used from 1900 to 1920

Flag used from 1924 to 1956

Flag used in 1936

Flag used from 1960 to 1964

Canada has competed at 27 Summer Olympic Games, missing only the inaugural 1896 Summer Olympics and the boycotted 1980 Summer Olympics. This count includes the 1906 Olympic Games, deemed unofficial 43 years after they were held (Canada won a gold and silver medal). The nation made its debut at the 1900 Summer Olympics. Canada competes under the IOC country code CAN.

== Hosted games ==
Canada has hosted the Summer Olympic Games once, in 1976 in Montreal, Quebec.

Games	Host city	Dates	Nations	Participants	Events
1976 Summer Olympics	Montreal, Quebec	July 17–August 1	92	6,084	198

== Medal tables ==
Medals by year

Host country

Games	Athletes	Gold	Silver	Bronze	Total	Gold medal	Total medal
(Kingdom of Greece) 1896 Athens	did not participate						
(French Third Republic) 1900 Paris	did not participate						
(United States) 1904 St. Louis	52	4	1	1	6	3	3
(United Kingdom) 1908 London	87	3	3	10	16	7	5
(Sweden) 1912 Stockholm	37	3	2	3	8	9	9
(Belgium) 1920 Antwerp	53	3	3	3	9	12	13
(French Third Republic) 1924 Paris	65	0	3	1	4	20	18
(Netherlands) 1928 Amsterdam	69	4	4	7	15	10	10
(United States) 1932 Los Angeles	102	2	5	8	15	13	10
(Nazi Germany) 1936 Berlin	97	1	3	5	9	17	14
(United Kingdom) 1948 London	118	0	1	2	3	25	22
(Finland) 1952 Helsinki	107	1	2	0	3	21	25
(Australia) 1956 Melbourne	92	2	1	3	6	15	15
(Italy) 1960 Rome	85	0	1	0	1	32	34
(Japan) 1964 Tokyo	115	1	2	1	4	22	21
1968 Mexico City	138	1	3	1	5	23	21
(West Germany) 1972 Munich	208	0	2	3	5	27	22
(Canada) 1976 Montreal	385	0	5	6	11	27	13
(Soviet Union) 1980 Moscow	boycotted						
(United States) 1984 Los Angeles	408	10	18	16	44	6	4
(South Korea) 1988 Seoul	328	3	2	5	10	19	19
(Spain) 1992 Barcelona	295	7	4	7	18	11	15
(United States) 1996 Atlanta	303	3	11	8	22	21	11
(Australia) 2000 Sydney	294	3	3	8	14	24	24
(Greece) 2004 Athens	262	3	6	3	12	21	19
(China) 2008 Beijing	332	3	9	8	20	20	13
(United Kingdom) 2012 London	273	2	6	10	18	27	15
(Brazil) 2016 Rio de Janeiro	314	4	3	15	22	20	10
(Japan) 2020 Tokyo	381	7	7	10	24	11	11
(France) 2024 Paris	315	9	7	11	27	12	11
(United States) 2028 Los Angeles	future event						
(Australia) 2032 Brisbane	future event						
Total (27/30)	5,315	79	117	155	351	19	15

Notes

- ^{ART} Art competitions (1912–1948) are not included in the medal table above, as they were non-sports events formerly part of the Olympic Games. (Note: In 1952, art competition medals, as well as the gold medal awards for feats in alpinism and aeronautics, were removed from the official national medal counts. Only since 2021 have they been officially listed again by the IOC in the medal tables and respective National Olympic Committee (NOC) profiles on its website.) Canada won a total of two art competition medals (1 silver, and 1 bronze), across the 1932, and 1948 Summer Olympics.
- ^{NAT} Athletes at the early Olympic Games (1896, 1900, and 1904) are attributed by the International Olympic Committee (IOC) according to the national affiliation of their club/team rather than their nationality. (Note: In 2024, the IOC reinstated its original and current attribution policy for athletes at the early Olympic Games (1896, 1900, and 1904). From 2021 to 2024, the IOC briefly attributed medals in individual events according to the athlete's nationality, even when the athlete represented a foreign club/team. Since 2024, participation and medals have instead been attributed according to the national affiliation of the club/team represented by the athlete.) Canadian George Orton competed at the 1900 Summer Olympics, winning a gold medal and a bronze medal in athletics. As he represented the American University of Pennsylvania, his results are attributed to the United States.

Canada also won 1 gold medal and 1 silver medal at the 1906 Intercalated Games, which the IOC no longer recognizes as an official Olympic games, so these medals are not counted in this table.

Medals by sport

Leading in that sport

Sport	Gold	Silver	Bronze	Total
Athletics	18	19	32	69
Swimming	12	20	30	62
Rowing	10	18	16	44
Canoeing and kayaking (sprint)	5	11	12	28
Shooting	4	3	2	9
Boxing	3	7	8	18
Freestyle wrestling	3	7	7	17
Artistic swimming	3	4	1	8
Trampoline gymnastics	2	3	3	8
Weightlifting	2	3	1	6
Track cycling	2	2	6	10
Equestrian (jumping)	2	2	1	5
Football	2	0	2	4
Lacrosse	2	0	1	3
Diving	1	5	9	15
Judo	1	2	5	8
Triathlon	1	1	0	2
Tennis	1	0	1	2
Artistic gymnastics	1	0	0	1
Breaking	1	0	0	1
Golf	1	0	0	1
Rhythmic gymnastics	1	0	0	1
Sailing	0	3	6	9
Mountain biking	0	2	1	3
Road cycling	0	1	2	3
Taekwondo	0	1	2	3
Beach volleyball	0	1	1	2
Rugby sevens	0	1	1	2
Basketball	0	1	0	1
Equestrian (dressage)	0	0	1	1
Equestrian (eventing)	0	0	1	1
Fencing	0	0	1	1
Marathon swimming	0	0	1	1
Softball	0	0	1	1
Totals (34 entries)	78	117	155	350

*One of Canada's ice hockey gold medals was won during the 1920 Summer Olympics. This table does not include this medal, resulting in the discrepancy between the medals by games and medals by sports tables.

Canada has never won an Olympic medal in the following current or recent summer sports or disciplines: aquatics (water polo), archery, badminton, baseball, basketball (3-on-3), canoeing and kayaking (slalom), cycling (BMX freestyle), cycling (BMX racing), field hockey, handball, karate, modern pentathlon, skateboarding, sport climbing, surfing, table tennis, volleyball (indoor), and wrestling (Greco-Roman).

== Aquatics ==
=== Artistic swimming ===
Canada has been very successful in synchronized swimming at the Olympics, winning medals at every games in which the sport was competed except for 2004 & 2008.

In 1992, Sylvie Fréchette was originally awarded a silver medal in the women's solo event. This was the result of a judge inadvertently entering a score of "8.7" instead of the intended "9.7" in the computerized scoring system for her technical figures performance. This error ultimately led to Fréchette placing second, leaving Kristen Babb-Sprague to win the gold medal. Following an appeal, FINA awarded Fréchette a gold medal, replacing her silver medal and leaving the two swimmers both with gold.

Games	Gold	Silver	Bronze	Total
1984 Los Angeles	0	2	0	2
1988 Seoul	2	0	0	2
1992 Barcelona	1	1	0	2
1996 Atlanta	0	1	0	1
2000 Sydney	0	0	1	1
Totals (5 entries)	3	4	1	8

=== Diving ===
Canada's only gold medal in diving was won by Sylvie Bernier in Los Angeles. At the 2012 Olympics, Émilie Heymans became the first Canadian Summer Olympian to win a medal in four straight Olympics.

Games	Gold	Silver	Bronze	Total
1956 Melbourne	0	0	1	1
1984 Los Angeles	1	0	0	1
1996 Atlanta	0	0	1	1
2000 Sydney	0	1	1	2
2004 Athens	0	1	1	2
2008 Beijing	0	2	0	2
2012 London	0	0	2	2
2016 Rio de Janeiro	0	0	2	2
2020 Tokyo	0	1	0	1
2024 Paris	0	0	1	1
Totals (10 entries)	1	5	9	15

=== Marathon swimming ===
Canada has only won an Olympic medal in marathon swimming once, a bronze by Richard Weinberger in 2012.

Games	Gold	Silver	Bronze	Total
2012 London	0	0	1	1
Totals (1 entries)	0	0	1	1

=== Swimming ===
After George Hodgson won two gold medals in the 1912 Stockholm games, it would be 72 years before Alex Baumann became the second Canadian swimmer to win Olympic gold, when he won both individual medley events in world record time in the 1984 Los Angeles games. Victor Davis (1984), Anne Ottenbrite (1984), Mark Tewksbury (1992), Penny Oleksiak (2016), Maggie Mac Neil (2020) and Summer McIntosh (2024) are the other Canadian swimmers to win gold medals. In 2004, Canada failed to win a medal of any colour in swimming for the first time in 40 years. At the Tokyo Olympics, Penny Oleksiak became the most decorated Canadian Olympian of all time, winning a total of 7 medals. At the Paris Olympics in 2024, Summer McIntosh became Canada's first three time Olympic gold medalist in swimming.

Games	Gold	Silver	Bronze	Total
1912 Stockholm	2	0	0	2
1920 Antwerp	0	1	1	2
1928 Amsterdam	0	0	1	1
1968 Mexico City	0	3	1	4
1972 Munich	0	2	2	4
1976 Montreal*	0	2	6	8
1984 Los Angeles	4	3	3	10
1988 Seoul	0	1	1	2
1992 Barcelona	1	0	1	2
1996 Atlanta	0	1	2	3
2000 Sydney	0	0	1	1
2008 Beijing	0	0	1	1
2012 London	0	1	1	2
2016 Rio de Janeiro	1	1	4	6
2020 Tokyo	1	3	2	6
2024 Paris	3	2	3	8
Totals (16 entries)	12	20	30	62

=== Water polo ===
Canada has never won an Olympic medal in water polo. Their best finish was fifth in the women's tournament at the 2000 games.

== Archery ==
Canada has never won an Olympic medal in archery. Their best finish was fifth in the women's individual competition at the 1976 games.

== Athletics ==
Canada is not traditionally strong in athletics, but the nation has won medals in 19 of 27 games in which it has competed. Some memorable performances are the double gold by Percy Williams in the 100m and 200m in the 1928 Amsterdam games, and the gold medals won in Atlanta (1996) by Donovan Bailey in the 100m (in world record time) and by the men's 4 × 100 m relay team.

In 1912, Frank Lukeman originally finished fourth in the men's pentathlon. However, after learning that first place finisher Jim Thorpe had played semi-professional baseball before the 1912 Games, violating contemporary Olympic amateurism rules, the IOC stripped his gold medal in 1913. As a result, Lukeman was awarded the bronze medal. In 1982, the IOC was convinced that Thorpe's disqualification had been improper, as no protest against his eligibility had been brought within the required 30 days, and reinstated his medal, but without demoting the other athletes. In 2022, the IOC reinstated Thorpe as the sole gold medalist of the event, with Lukeman remaining bronze medalist.

Ben Johnson originally won gold in the men's 100m at the 1988 games. However, after a positive doping test he was disqualified and his medal stripped.

In 2008, Dylan Armstrong originally finished in fourth place in the men's shot put. However, following the third place finisher being disqualified for doping he was awarded the bronze medal.

In 2012, Derek Drouin originally won bronze at the men's high jump. After gold medalist Ivan Ukhov of Russia was disqualified for doping in 2019, he was upgraded to silver in 2021.

In 2020, Canada originally won bronze in the men's 4 × 100 m relay event. After a positive doping test by a member of the silver medalist Great Britain team, the IOC disqualified them. As a result, Canada's result was upgraded to a silver medal.

Games	Gold	Silver	Bronze	Total
1904 St. Louis	1	0	0	1
1908 London	1	1	4	6
1912 Stockholm	1	2	2	5
1920 Antwerp	1	0	0	1
1928 Amsterdam	4	2	2	8
1932 Los Angeles	1	3	5	9
1936 Berlin	0	1	3	4
1948 London	0	0	1	1
1964 Tokyo	0	1	1	2
1976 Montreal*	0	1	0	1
1984 Los Angeles	0	2	3	5
1988 Seoul	0	0	1	1
1992 Barcelona	1	1	1	3
1996 Atlanta	2	0	0	2
2008 Beijing	0	0	2	2
2012 London	0	1	0	1
2016 Rio de Janeiro	1	1	4	6
2020 Tokyo	2	2	2	6
2024 Paris	3	1	1	5
Totals (19 entries)	18	19	32	69

- Canadian George Orton competed at the 1900 Summer Olympics, winning a gold medal and a bronze medal in athletics. As he represented the American University of Pennsylvania, his results are attributed to the United States.
- Canada also won 1 gold medal and 1 silver medal in Athletics at the 1906 Intercalated Games, which the IOC no longer recognizes as an official Olympic games, so these medals are not counted in this table.

== Badminton ==
Canada has never won an Olympic medal in badminton since its introduction to the Olympics in 1992. Their best finish was fourth in the women's doubles competition at the 2012 games.

== Baseball and Softball ==
=== Baseball ===
Canada has never won an Olympic medal in baseball. Their best finish was fourth at the 2004 games.

=== Softball ===
Canada has won one Olympic medal in softball, a bronze in the women's tournament at the 2020 games.

Games	Gold	Silver	Bronze	Total
2020 Tokyo	0	0	1	1
Totals (1 entries)	0	0	1	1

== Basketball ==
=== Basketball ===
Canada has only won an Olympic medal in basketball once, a silver in 1936.

Games	Gold	Silver	Bronze	Total
1936 Berlin	0	1	0	1
Totals (1 entries)	0	1	0	1

=== 3-on-3 basketball ===
Canada has never won an Olympic medal in 3-on-3 basketball since its introduction to the Olympics in 2020. Their best was fourth in the women's tournament at the 2024 games.

== Boxing ==
Canada has enjoyed modest success in Olympic boxing, winning medals in eight games. Lennox Lewis won the super heavyweight gold medal in Seoul, before competing for his native Great Britain as a professional.

Games	Gold	Silver	Bronze	Total
1920 Antwerp	1	2	2	5
1924 Paris	0	0	1	1
1928 Amsterdam	0	0	1	1
1932 Los Angeles	1	0	0	1
1984 Los Angeles	0	2	1	3
1988 Seoul	1	1	1	3
1992 Barcelona	0	1	1	2
1996 Atlanta	0	1	0	1
2024 Paris	0	0	1	1
Totals (9 entries)	3	7	8	18

== Breakdancing ==
Canada's Phil Wizard won the gold medal in the first Olympic men's breakdancing competition at the 2024 games.

Games	Gold	Silver	Bronze	Total
2024 Paris	1	0	0	1
Totals (1 entries)	1	0	0	1

== Canoeing and kayaking ==
=== Slalom ===
Canada has never won an Olympic medal in a whitewater event. Their best finish was fourth in the men's K-1 competition at the 2004 games.

=== Sprint ===
Adam van Koeverden and Caroline Brunet are recent multiple medal winners for Canada.

Games	Gold	Silver	Bronze	Total
1936 Berlin	1	1	1	3
1948 London	0	1	1	2
1952 Helsinki	0	1	0	1
1976 Montreal*	0	1	0	1
1984 Los Angeles	2	2	2	6
1996 Atlanta	0	1	0	1
2000 Sydney	0	1	1	2
2004 Athens	1	0	2	3
2008 Beijing	0	1	1	2
2012 London	0	1	2	3
2020 Tokyo	0	1	1	2
2024 Paris	1	0	1	2
Totals (12 entries)	5	11	12	28

== Cycling ==
Two Canadians have won gold medals in cycling: Lori-Ann Muenzer at the 2004 Summer Olympics in Athens, and Kelsey Mitchell at the 2020 Summer Olympics in Tokyo. Another Canadian cyclist of note is Clara Hughes, double bronze medalist in Atlanta (1996). She has also won medals in the 2002 and 2006 Winter Olympics in speed skating, and is the only Olympian to win multiple medals in both the summer and winter games.

=== BMX racing ===
Canada has never won an Olympic medal in a BMX racing event since its introduction to the Olympics in 2008. Their best finish was fifth in the men's competition at the 2016 games and the women's competition at the 2024 games.

=== BMX freestyle ===
Canada has never won an Olympic medal in a BMX freestyle event since its introduction to the Olympics in 2020. Their best finish was tenth in the men's competition at the 2024 games.

=== Mountain biking ===
Games	Gold	Silver	Bronze	Total
1996 Atlanta	0	1	0	1
2004 Athens	0	1	0	1
2016 Rio de Janeiro	0	0	1	1
Totals (3 entries)	0	2	1	3

=== Road ===
Games	Gold	Silver	Bronze	Total
1984 Los Angeles	0	1	0	1
1996 Atlanta	0	0	2	2
Totals (2 entries)	0	1	2	3

=== Track ===
Games	Gold	Silver	Bronze	Total
1908 London	0	0	1	1
1984 Los Angeles	0	1	0	1
1992 Barcelona	0	0	1	1
1996 Atlanta	0	1	1	2
2004 Athens	1	0	0	1
2012 London	0	0	1	1
2016 Rio de Janeiro	0	0	1	1
2020 Tokyo	1	0	1	2
Totals (8 entries)	2	2	6	10

== Equestrian ==
Canada's first gold medal in equestrian events was won by the show jumping team in Mexico City. A second gold medal, and the first in an individual event, went to Eric Lamaze at the 2008 Beijing Olympics.

=== Dressage ===
Games	Gold	Silver	Bronze	Total
1988 Seoul	0	0	1	1
Totals (1 entries)	0	0	1	1

=== Eventing ===
Games	Gold	Silver	Bronze	Total
1956 Melbourne	0	0	1	1
Totals (1 entries)	0	0	1	1

=== Jumping ===
Games	Gold	Silver	Bronze	Total
1968 Mexico City	1	0	0	1
1976 Montreal*	0	1	0	1
2008 Beijing	1	1	0	2
2016 Rio de Janeiro	0	0	1	1
Totals (4 entries)	2	2	1	5

== Fencing ==
Canada has won one Olympic medal in fencing, a bronze by Eleanor Harvey in the women's individual foil at the 2024 games.

Games	Gold	Silver	Bronze	Total
2024 Paris	0	0	1	1
Totals (1 entries)	0	0	1	1

== Field hockey ==
Canada has never won an Olympic medal in field hockey. Their best finish was fifth in the women's tournament at the 1984 games.

== Football (Soccer) ==
Canada first competed in Olympic football at the second tournament, 1904. One club team from Canada went to St. Louis to compete against two American teams, winning the gold medal. Canada's men's soccer team is considered unlikely to qualify for the Olympics. The women's national team won the bronze medal in the 2012 and 2016 Olympics and won the gold at the 2020 Olympics in Tokyo.

Games	Gold	Silver	Bronze	Total
1904 St. Louis	1	0	0	1
2012 London	0	0	1	1
2016 Rio de Janeiro	0	0	1	1
2020 Tokyo	1	0	0	1
Totals (4 entries)	2	0	2	4

== Golf ==
Golf was only included in the Olympic program for the 1900 and 1904 games, at which George Lyon won the individual gold medal.

Games	Gold	Silver	Bronze	Total
1904 St. Louis	1	0	0	1
Totals (1 entries)	1	0	0	1

== Gymnastics ==
Canada has only won a single medal in artistic gymnastics, a gold by Kyle Shewfelt in Athens. Lori Fung won a gold in rhythmic gymnastics in Los Angeles and Canadians have also won medals in trampolining.

=== Artistic ===
Games	Gold	Silver	Bronze	Total
2004 Athens	1	0	0	1
Totals (1 entries)	1	0	0	1

=== Rhythmic ===
Games	Gold	Silver	Bronze	Total
1984 Los Angeles	1	0	0	1
Totals (1 entries)	1	0	0	1

=== Trampoline ===
Games	Gold	Silver	Bronze	Total
2000 Sydney	0	0	2	2
2004 Athens	0	1	0	1
2008 Beijing	0	2	0	2
2012 London	1	0	0	1
2016 Rio de Janeiro	1	0	0	1
2024 Paris	0	0	1	1
Totals (6 entries)	2	3	3	8

== Handball ==
Canada has never won an Olympic medal in handball. Their best finish was sixth in the women's tournament at the 1976 games.

== Ice hockey ==
Canada won the gold medal when ice hockey was introduced in the program of the 1920 Olympics in Antwerp. The sport was moved to the Winter Olympics program for the first winter games in 1924.

Games	Gold	Silver	Bronze	Total
1920 Antwerp	1	0	0	1
Totals (1 entries)	1	0	0	1

== Judo ==
Canada has won 7 medals in judo at the Olympics. Doug Rogers won silver at the sport's inaugural event in 1964 in Tokyo. Most recently, Jessica Klimkait and Catherine Beauchemin-Pinard won bronze at the 2020 Summer Olympics in Tokyo.

Games	Gold	Silver	Bronze	Total
1964 Tokyo	0	1	0	1
1984 Los Angeles	0	0	1	1
1992 Barcelona	0	0	1	1
2000 Sydney	0	1	0	1
2012 London	0	0	1	1
2020 Tokyo	0	0	2	2
2024 Paris	1	0	0	1
Totals (7 entries)	1	2	5	8

== Karate ==
Canada has never won an Olympic medal in karate. Their best finish was tied for seventh at the men's +75 kg competition at the 2020 games.

== Lacrosse ==
Lacrosse was only part of the Olympic program in the 1904 and 1908 games; Canadian teams won the gold medal each time. In 1904, a second Canadian team, composed only of Mohawk players, also won a bronze medal.

Games	Gold	Silver	Bronze	Total
1904 St. Louis	1	0	1	2
1908 London	1	0	0	1
Totals (2 entries)	2	0	1	3

== Modern pentathlon ==
Canada has never won an Olympic medal in modern pentathlon. Their best finish was eleventh in the men's team competition at the 1988 games and the women's competition at the 2012 games.

== Rowing ==
Rowing is one of Canada's most successful sports at the summer Olympics. The pair of Marnie McBean and Kathleen Heddle won gold in both the Barcelona (1992) and Atlanta (1996) games. Canada has traditionally done well in the eight events, with the men's team winning a medal 9 times and the women's team winning a medal 4 times.

Games	Gold	Silver	Bronze	Total
1904 St. Louis	0	1	0	1
1908 London	0	0	3	3
1912 Stockholm	0	0	1	1
1924 Paris	0	2	0	2
1928 Amsterdam	0	1	1	2
1932 Los Angeles	0	0	2	2
1956 Melbourne	1	1	0	2
1960 Rome	0	1	0	1
1964 Tokyo	1	0	0	1
1984 Los Angeles	1	2	3	6
1992 Barcelona	4	0	1	5
1996 Atlanta	1	4	1	6
2000 Sydney	0	0	1	1
2004 Athens	0	1	0	1
2008 Beijing	1	1	2	4
2012 London	0	2	0	2
2016 Rio de Janeiro	0	1	0	1
2020 Tokyo	1	0	1	2
2024 Paris	0	1	0	1
Totals (19 entries)	10	18	16	44

== Rugby ==
=== Union ===
Canada never qualified to compete in rugby union at the Olympic games prior to its removal from the program in 1924.

=== Sevens ===
The Canadian rugby sevens team won a bronze in the women's tournament at the 2016 games, which was the sport's first time being included on the program, and silver in the women's tournament at the 2024 games.

Games	Gold	Silver	Bronze	Total
2016 Rio de Janeiro	0	0	1	1
2024 Paris	0	1	0	1
Totals (2 entries)	0	1	1	2

== Sailing ==
Canada's most notable event in Olympic sailing competition was from the 1988 Seoul games, where Lawrence Lemieux was racing towards a certain medal finish, but stopped to help two Singaporean sailors whose boat had capsized during the race. Lemieux was later presented an award from IOC president Juan Antonio Samaranch to honor his act of bravery.

Games	Gold	Silver	Bronze	Total
1932 Los Angeles	0	1	1	2
1972 Munich	0	0	1	1
1984 Los Angeles	0	1	2	3
1988 Seoul	0	0	1	1
1992 Barcelona	0	0	1	1
2004 Athens	0	1	0	1
Totals (6 entries)	0	3	6	9

== Shooting ==
Linda Thom's gold medal in the 1984 Los Angeles games was the first summer Olympic gold medal for Canada in 16 years, having been shut out in Munich (1972) and Montreal (1976), and boycotting the Moscow (1980) games. Since her victory was unexpected, and the sport is not very popular, the event was not broadcast live and Canadian television crews had to scramble to put taped images on the air.

Games	Gold	Silver	Bronze	Total
1908 London	1	2	1	4
1924 Paris	0	1	0	1
1952 Helsinki	1	0	0	1
1956 Melbourne	1	0	1	2
1984 Los Angeles	1	0	0	1
Totals (5 entries)	4	3	2	9

== Skateboarding ==
Canada has never won an Olympic medal in skateboarding. Their best finish was seventh by Cordano Russell in the men's street competition at the 2024 games.

== Sport climbing ==
Canada has never won an Olympic medal in sport climbing. Their best finish was 14th in the women's combined competition at the 2020 games.

== Surfing ==
Canada has never won an Olympic medal in surfing. Their best finish was tied for 17th in the women's shortboard competition at the 2024 games.

== Table tennis ==
Canada has never won an Olympic medal in table tennis since its introduction in the 1988 games. Their best finish was tied for fifth in the men's singles tournament at the 1996 games.

== Taekwondo ==
Dominique Bosshart won a bronze medal when the sport of taekwondo was introduced at the 2000 Sydney games. Karine Sergerie won silver in the 67 kilogram event, achieving Canada's best-ever finish in taekwondo at the Olympic Games.

Games	Gold	Silver	Bronze	Total
2000 Sydney	0	0	1	1
2008 Beijing	0	1	0	1
2024 Paris	0	0	1	1
Totals (3 entries)	0	1	2	3

== Tennis ==
Canada's first medal in Olympic tennis was the surprising victory by Sébastien Lareau and Daniel Nestor in the men's double competition of the 2000 Sydney games, beating the home favourite Australian team. Gabriela Dabrowski and Félix Auger-Aliassime won bronze in the mixed doubles competition at the 2024 games.

Games	Gold	Silver	Bronze	Total
2000 Sydney	1	0	0	1
2024 Paris	0	0	1	1
Totals (2 entries)	1	0	1	2

== Triathlon ==
Simon Whitfield won the gold medal when triathlon was introduced at the 2000 Sydney games. After an 11th-place finish at the 2004 Athens games, Whitfield returned to take the silver medal at the 2008 Beijing games. Whitfield was nudged out at the end of the race for the gold medal.

Games	Gold	Silver	Bronze	Total
2000 Sydney	1	0	0	1
2008 Beijing	0	1	0	1
Totals (2 entries)	1	1	0	2

== Volleyball ==
Canada's lone medal in volleyball was won by the beach volleyball team of John Child and Mark Heese when the event was introduced as a medal sport at the 1996 Atlanta games.

=== Beach ===
Games	Gold	Silver	Bronze	Total
1996 Atlanta	0	0	1	1
2024 Paris	0	1	0	1
Totals (2 entries)	0	1	1	2

=== Indoor ===
Canada has never won an Olympic medal in indoor volleyball. Their best finish was fourth in the men's tournament at the 1984 games.

== Weightlifting ==
Canada's medals in weightlifting were won by Gerald Gratton in 1952, Jacques Demers in 1984, and Christine Girard in 2008 and 2012.

In 2008 Christine Girard originally finished fourth place in the women's 63 kg event. After a positive doping test by the silver medallist the IOC disqualified her, and Girard's result was retroactively upgraded to a bronze. In 2012 Christine Girard originally won the bronze medal in the women's 63 kg event. After positive doping tests by the gold and silver medallists the IOC disqualified them, and Girard's result was retroactively upgraded to a gold.

Games	Gold	Silver	Bronze	Total
1952 Helsinki	0	1	0	1
1984 Los Angeles	0	1	0	1
2008 Beijing	0	0	1	1
2012 London	1	0	0	1
2020 Tokyo	1	0	0	1
2024 Paris	0	1	0	1
Totals (6 entries)	2	3	1	6

== Wrestling ==
Canada's three gold medals in wrestling were won by Daniel Igali in the 2000 Sydney games, Carol Huynh in the 2008 Beijing games in freestyle and Erica Wiebe in the 2016 Rio de Janeiro games in freestyle.

=== Freestyle ===
Games	Gold	Silver	Bronze	Total
1908 London	0	0	1	1
1928 Amsterdam	0	1	2	3
1932 Los Angeles	0	1	0	1
1936 Berlin	0	0	1	1
1984 Los Angeles	0	1	1	2
1992 Barcelona	0	1	0	1
1996 Atlanta	0	1	0	1
2000 Sydney	1	0	0	1
2004 Athens	0	1	0	1
2008 Beijing	1	0	1	2
2012 London	0	1	1	2
2016 Rio de Janeiro	1	0	0	1
Totals (12 entries)	3	7	7	17

=== Greco-Roman ===
Canada has never won an Olympic medal in Greco-Roman wrestling. Their best finish was fourth in the men's light heavyweight competition at the 1956 games.

== See also ==
- List of Canadian Summer Olympics gold medallists
- Canada at the Winter Olympics
- Own the Podium - Canada's government-sponsored program to win more medals
