= Canada at the 2028 Summer Olympics =

- Flag of Canada
- IOC code: CAN
- NOC: Canadian Olympic Committee
- Website: www.olympic.ca

in Los Angeles, United States July 14, 2028 – July 30, 2028
- Competitors: 32 in 2 sports
- Medals: Gold 0 Silver 0 Bronze 0 Total 0

Summer Olympics appearances (overview)
- ~~1900~~; 1904; 1908; 1912; 1920; 1924; 1928; 1932; 1936; 1948; 1952; 1956; 1960; 1964; 1968; 1972; 1976; 1980; 1984; 1988; 1992; 1996; 2000; 2004; 2008; 2012; 2016; 2020; 2024; 2028

Other related appearances
- 1906 Intercalated Games

Canada is scheduled to compete at the 2028 Summer Olympics in Los Angeles, California, United States from July 14 to 30, 2028. Since Canada's debut in 1900, Canadian athletes have appeared in every edition of the Summer Olympic Games, except for the 1980 Summer Olympics in Moscow because of the country's support for the United States-led boycott.

== Competitors ==
The following is the list of number of competitors in the Games.

Sport	Men	Women	Total
Flag football	10	10	20
Volleyball	0	12	12
Total	10	22	32

== Flag football ==
Canada qualified a men's and women's team of ten athletes each, for a total of 20 athletes. The women's team qualified on August 15, 2026 by qualifying for the final at the 2026 IFAF Women's Flag Football World Championship in Düsseldorf, Germany. The women's team were Canada's first quota spots earned for the Games. The men's team qualified the following day after winning bronze and finishing as one of the two highest ranked eligible teams for qualification at the 2026 IFAF Men's Flag Football World Championship, also held in Düsseldorf.

As the sport is making its debut at the Olympics, this also marks the country's debut appearance in the sport at the Olympics.

== Volleyball ==
Canada qualified a women's volleyball team by winning the qualification tournament as part of the 2026 Women's NORCECA Volleyball Championship in Santo Domingo, Dominican Republic. The qualification marked Canada's first Olympic appearance in women's volleyball since the 1996 Summer Olympics in Atlanta, 32 years earlier.

Canada qualified a women's beach volleyball team at the NORCECA championships.

== See also ==
- Canada at the 2026 Commonwealth Games
- Canada at the 2026 Summer Youth Olympics
