= Henri Tauzin =

French hurdler

Olympic medal record

Men's athletics

Representing France
Silver medal – second place	1900 Paris	400 metre hurdles

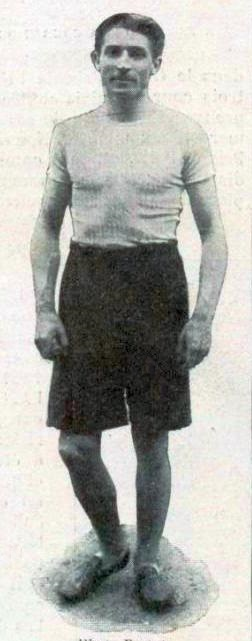
Henri Tauzin

Henri Alexis Tauzin (17 April 1879 in Paris – 11 October 1918 in Lyon) was a French athlete who competed in the early twentieth century. He specialized in the 400 metres hurdles and won a silver medal in Athletics at the 1900 Summer Olympics in Paris, his birthplace.

Tauzin also competed in the 200 metre hurdles, finishing fourth in his semifinal heat to not advance to the final.

An administrative officer in the army, Tauzin was killed in action during World War I.
