= William Remington (athlete) =

American track and field athlete

The Right Reverend William Procter Remington D.D.
- Suffragan Bishop of Pennsylvania
- Church: Episcopal Church
- Diocese: Pennsylvania
- Elected: June 26, 1945
- In office: 1945–1951
- Previous posts: Suffragan Bishop of South Dakota (1918-1922); Bishop of Eastern Oregon (1923-1945)

Orders
- Ordination: June 10, 1906 by Ozi William Whitaker
- Consecration: January 10, 1918 by Daniel S. Tuttle

Personal details
- Born: March 13, 1878 Philadelphia, Pennsylvania, U.S.
- Died: December 19, 1963 (aged 85) La Jolla, California, U.S.
- Denomination: Anglican
- Parents: Joseph Price Remington & Elizabeth Baily Collins
- Spouse: Florence Lyman Allen

William Procter Remington (March 13, 1879 – December 19, 1963) was an American track and field athlete who competed at the 1900 Summer Olympics in Paris, France. He was also a prelate of the Episcopal Church.

== Early life and education ==
Remington was born on March 13, 1879, in Philadelphia, Pennsylvania, the son of Joseph Price Remington and Elizabeth Baily Collins. He is a descendant of John Remington, who emigrated from England to Salem, New Jersey. He was educated at the DeLancey School in Philadelphia and later graduated with a Bachelor of Science from the University of Pennsylvania in 1900. He then embarked on his athletic career. Later, he graduated with Bachelor of Divinity from Virginia Theological Seminary in 1905 and was later awarded an honorary Doctor of Divinity from the same institution in 1918.

== Athletic career ==
Remington placed fourth in the long jump. His best jump in the qualifier was 6.725 metres, good for fourth place going into the final. He bettered this by 10 centimetres in the final, but remained in fourth place. Remington also competed in the 110 metre hurdles. He placed second in his first-round heat and second in his repechage heat, not qualifying for the final. He also placed fourth in his semifinal heat of the 200 metre hurdles and did not qualify for the final in that event either.

== Ordained ministry ==
Remington was ordained deacon in 1905 and priest in 1906. He then served as assistant rector at Holy Trinity Church in Philadelphia between 1905 and 1907. He then became vicar of the Memorial Chapel of the Holy Communion in Philadelphia and during 1911 and 1918 served as rector of St. Paul's Church in Minneapolis. In the First World War he served as chaplain of Base Hospital 26. He was elected Suffragan Bishop of South Dakota in 1917 and was consecrated on January 18, 1918. He was appointed as missionary Bishop of Eastern Oregon on September 20, 1922, and was installed November 19, 1923. He was later elected as Suffragan Bishop of Pennsylvania on June 26, 1945, and installed in November 1945. He retired in 1951 and died in 1963.
