= Jean Lécuyer =

French hurdler

Jean Lécuyer (born 20 April 1876, date of death unknown) was a French track and field athlete who competed at the 1900 Summer Olympics in Paris, France. Lécuyer competed in the 110 metre hurdles, finishing in fourth place overall. He won his first-round heat in a walk-over before finishing fourth of four starters in the final.
