= Athletics at the 1900 Summer Olympics – Men's 2500 metres steeplechase =

Athletics at the Olympics

Men's 2500 metres steeplechase at the Games of the II Olympiad
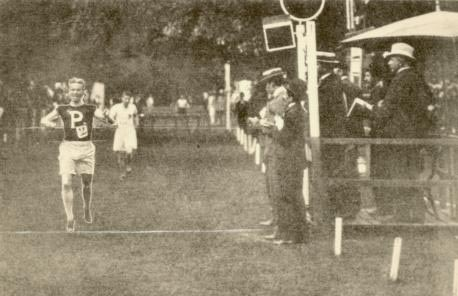
- Finish of the race
- Venue: Bois de Boulogne
- Date: July 15, 1900
- Competitors: 6 from 6 nations
- Winning time: 7:34.4

Medalists
1st place, gold medalist(s)		George Orton; United States
2nd place, silver medalist(s)		Sidney Robinson; Great Britain
3rd place, bronze medalist(s)		Jean Chastanié; France

The men's 2500 metres steeplechase was a track & field athletics event at the 1900 Summer Olympics in Paris. It was the first time that a steeplechase race was held at the Olympics. The race was held on July 15, 1900, on a 500-metre track. Six athletes from six nations competed in the shorter of the two steeplechase events. The 4000 metre steeplechase race was held one day later. The event was won by George Orton of Canada, who represented the United States at the games. Sidney Robinson of Great Britain took silver, while Jean Chastanié of France earned bronze.

== Background ==
This was the first Olympic steeplechase race, and the only time that an Olympic steeplechase race was held over the distance of 2500 metres. The 1900 Games introduced steeplechase events with this competition and the 4000 metres steeplechase. The next two Games would each feature a steeplechase, but at different distances: 2590 metres in 1904 and 3200 metres in 1908. There was no steeplechase event in 1912. After World War I, the now-standard 3000 metres steeplechase was introduced and has been held at every Games since. Women's steeplechase, also at 3000 metres, was added in 2008.

Most of the American team did not compete due to the event being scheduled on a Sunday.

== Competition format ==
This steeplechase event featured a single race. The competition involved five laps of the 500 metre track, complete with standard hurdles as well as stone fences and a water jump.

== Records ==
None, this was the first time the event was held. And it was the only time a steeplechase race was held over 2500 metres.

== Schedule ==
Date	Time	Round
Sunday, 15 July 1900	17:00	Final

== Results ==
Robinson and Chastanié were the two leaders for most of the race, with Newton and Orton behind them, while Wraschtil and Duhne lost contact with the other four.

Orton was in fourth place for most of the race, but finished strongly to catch Robinson, Chastanié and Newton in the final straight of the fifth lap, going on to win by ten yards.

Chastanié and Newton faltered, with Robinson beating Chastanié by 40 yards for second as Newton faded to finish fourth.

Rank	Athlete	Nation	Time
1st place, gold medalist(s)	George Orton	United States	7:34.4
2nd place, silver medalist(s)	Sidney Robinson	Great Britain	7:38.0
3rd place, bronze medalist(s)	Jean Chastanié	France	7:52.4
4	Arthur L. Newton	United States	Unknown
5	Hermann Wraschtil	Austria	Unknown
6	Franz Duhne	Germany	Unknown
—	Charles Bennett	Great Britain	DNS
—	John Bray	United States	DNS
—	Wilbur Burroughs	United States	DNS
—	Alexander Grant	Canada	DNS

== Sources ==
- International Olympic Committee.
- De Wael, Herman. Herman's Full Olympians: "Athletics 1900". Accessed 18 March 2006. Available electronically at.
- Mallon, Bill (1998). The 1900 Olympic Games, Results for All Competitors in All Events, with Commentary. Jefferson, North Carolina: McFarland & Company, Inc., Publishers. ISBN 0-7864-0378-0.
