= Karel Nedvěd =

Czech runner

Karel Nedvěd was a Bohemian track and field athlete who competed at the 1900 Summer Olympics in Paris, France.

Nedvěd competed in the 400 metre hurdles, placing fifth of five overall. He placed third in his semifinal heat to be the only hurdler not to qualify for the final in the event, due to the five-man field being divided into two semifinals of two and three competitors with the top two from each semifinal advancing.
