= Eugène Choisel =

French hurdler and long jumper

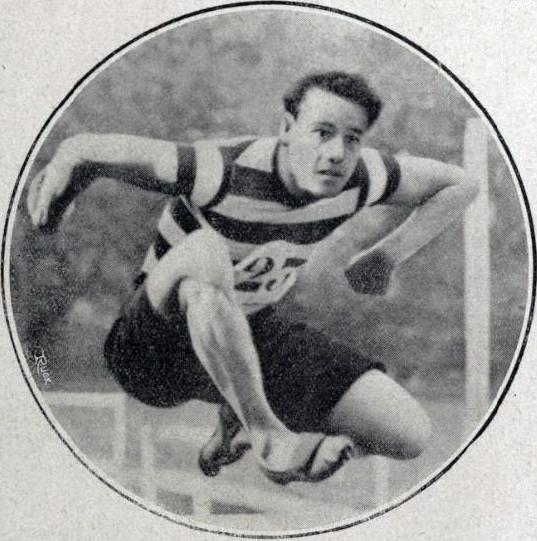
Eugène Choisel

Eugène Charles Choisel (15 September 1881 in Asnières-sur-Seine – 1 February 1946 in Paris) was a French track and field athlete who competed at the 1900 Summer Olympics in Paris, France. He placed fourth in the 200 metre hurdles. Choisel also competed in the 110 metre hurdles. He placed third in his first-round (semifinals) heat and did not advance to the final.

== Sources ==
- De Wael, Herman. Herman's Full Olympians: "Athletics 1900". Accessed 18 March 2006. Available electronically at.
- Mallon, Bill (1998). The 1900 Olympic Games, Results for All Competitors in All Events, with Commentary. Jefferson, North Carolina: McFarland & Company, Inc., Publishers. ISBN 0-7864-0378-0.
- Eugène Choisel's profile at Sports Reference.com
