= William Lewis (athlete) =

American track and field athlete

William Fraser Lewis (March 2, 1876 – March 1, 1962) was an American track and field athlete who competed at the 1900 Summer Olympics in Paris, France.

Lewis competed in the 110 metre hurdles. He placed third in his first-round heat and second in his repechage heat, not qualifying for the final. In the 200 metre hurdles, Lewis placed fifth in his semifinal heat and did not qualify for the final.

Lewis refused to take part in the final of the 400 metre hurdles, as the final was held on a Sunday. Having qualified for the final by taking second in his semifinal heat, this left Lewis in fourth place overall.

William Fraser Lewis was born 2 March 1874 in Canandaigua, New York, and died 1 March 1962 in Saint Petersburg, Florida. His parents were Clarence Whitney Lewis and Margaret Johnson.
