= Gustav Rau (athlete) =

German track and field athlete

Gustav Adolf Friedrich Gottfried Rau (born February 20, 1878, date of death unknown) was a German track and field athlete who competed at the 1900 Summer Olympics in Paris, France. He was born in Frankfurt.

Rau competed in the 200 metre hurdles. He placed fifth in his first-round (semifinal) heat, not qualifying for the final.
