= India at the 1900 Summer Olympics =

- Flag of India
- IOC code: IND

in Paris
- Competitors: 1 in 1 sport
- Medals Ranked 19th: Gold 0 Silver 2 Bronze 0 Total 2

Summer Olympics appearances (overview)
- 1900; 1904–1912; 1920; 1924; 1928; 1932; 1936; 1948; 1952; 1956; 1960; 1964; 1968; 1972; 1976; 1980; 1984; 1988; 1992; 1996; 2000; 2004; 2008; 2012; 2016; 2020; 2024

India competed at the 1900 Summer Olympics in Paris, France. It was the nation's first appearance at the modern Olympic Games. This marked the first participation of an Asian country in the Olympic Games.

One athlete, Norman Pritchard, participated in athletics. (Note: In the track and field statistics published by the World Athletics prior to the 2004 Summer Olympics, Pritchard was listed as having competed for Great Britain in 1900. Pritchard was chosen to represent Great Britain after competing in the British AAA championship in June 1900. But he was born in India and the International Olympic Committee regards him as having competed for India.) He competed in five events and won two silver medals. Until 2020, these were the only medals won by India in athletics. India was classified 19th in the overall medal table, which represents its best ever placement till date.

== Background ==
The Indian Olympic Association was recognized by the International Olympic Committee in 1927. However, by this time, the nation had already competed in four Olympic Games. This edition at Paris marked the nation's first appearance at the Summer Olympics. This marked the first participation of an Asian country in the Olympic Games. India was classified 19th in the overall medal table, which represents its best ever placement till date.

== Medalists ==
One athlete, Norman Pritchard, participated in athletics. He competed in five events and won two silver medals. Until 2020, these were the only medals won by India in athletics.

Medal	Name	Sport	Event	Date
(silver) Silver	Norman Pritchard	Athletics	Men's 200 metres hurdles	July 16
(silver) Silver	Norman Pritchard	Athletics	Men's 200 m	July 22

== Competitors ==
The following is the list of number of competitors per sport/discipline.

Sport	Athletes
Athletics	1
Total	1

== Athletics ==
Norman Pritchard competed in five events at the Games. In the 200 m hurdles, he set a then Olympic record of 26.8 seconds in the semifinals. In the final, he won the silver with a timing of 26 seconds after USA’s Alvin Kraenzlein registered a new Olympic record of 25.4 seconds to win the gold. In the 200 m, he finished second in the semifinals to qualify for the final. In the final, he registered another second place with a time of 22.8 seconds after Walter Tewksbury of the USA won gold with a time of 22.2 seconds.

Athlete	Event	Heat		Semifinal		Repechage		Final	
Athlete	Event	Result	Rank	Result	Rank	Result	Rank	Result	Rank
Norman Pritchard	60 m	7.1	3	—N/a				Did not advance	
Norman Pritchard	100 m	11.4	1 Q	Unknown	3	11.0	2	Did not advance	
Norman Pritchard	200 m	Unknown	2 Q	—N/a				22.8	2nd place, silver medalist(s)
Norman Pritchard	110 m hurdles	16.6	1 Q	—N/a				DNF	
Norman Pritchard	200 m hurdles	26.8	1 Q	n/a				26.0	2nd place, silver medalist(s)

Legend: Q = Qualified for the next phase.
