= Athletics at the 1900 Summer Olympics – Men's 110 metres hurdles =

Men's 110 metres hurdles at the Games of the II Olympiad
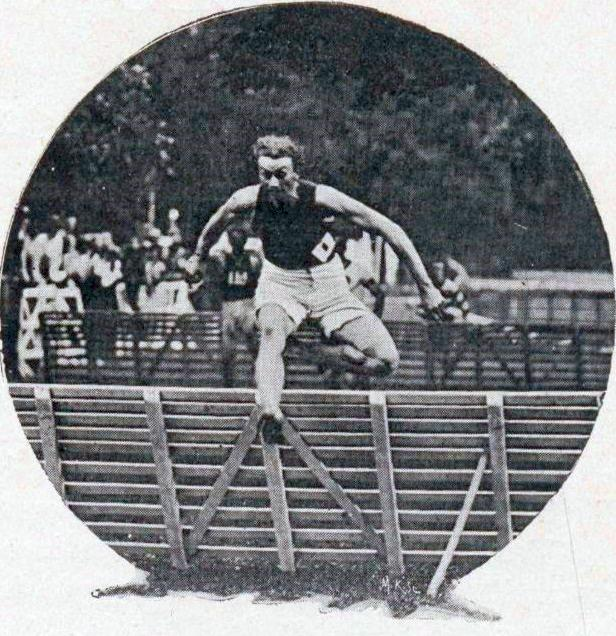
- Alvin Kraenzlein, 110 and 400 metres hurdles champion
- Venue: Bois de Boulogne
- Date: July 14, 1900
- Competitors: 9 from 3 nations
- Winning time: 15.4 OR

Medalists
1st place, gold medalist(s)		Alvin Kraenzlein; United States
2nd place, silver medalist(s)		John McLean; United States
3rd place, bronze medalist(s)		Frederick Moloney; United States

The men's 110 metres hurdles was the first of the track and field events on the athletics programme at the 1900 Summer Olympics in Paris. It was held on July 14, 1900. Nine athletes from three nations competed in the shortest of the hurdling events. The event was won by Alvin Kraenzlein of the United States, the second of five consecutive victories for the nation in the first five Olympic Games. It was also the first of four consecutive podium sweeps for the Americans in the event.

== Background ==
This was the second appearance of the event, which is one of 12 athletics events to have been held at every Summer Olympics. None of the hurdlers from 1896 returned. Alvin Kraenzlein was the dominant hurdler of the time and an overwhelming favorite.

India made its first appearance in the event. France and the United States each made their second appearances, the only two nations to compete in the 110 metres hurdles in both the first two Games.

== Competition format ==
There were three rounds: semifinals, repechages, and a final. The top runners in each of the 3 semifinal heats advanced to the final, while all other finishers in the heats moved to the repechages. Two repechage heats were held, with the winner of each advancing to the final.

== Records ==
These were the standing world and Olympic records (in seconds) prior to the 1900 Summer Olympics. No world record was recognized until 1912, when the IAAF recognized a 1908 performance as the first world record. Alvin Kraenzlein's 15.2 seconds in the 120 yards (slightly shorter) was the closest equivalent.

World record	15.2y	(United States) Alvin Kraenzlein	Chicago	18 June 1898
Olympic record	17.6	(United States) Thomas Curtis	Athens (GRE)	April 10, 1896 (NS)

At first Alvin Kraenzlein set a new Olympic record in the first heat of the first round with 15.6 seconds. In the final he improved this to 15.4 seconds.

== Schedule ==
Date	Time	Round
Saturday, 14 July 1900	9:30 10:05	Semifinals; Repechage; Final

== Results ==
=== Semifinals ===
In the first round, there were three heats. The top runners in each advanced to the finals, with the other runners competing in repechage heats.

==== Semifinal 1 ====
Kraenzlein set a new world record and won by three yards - though he was slower than his previous mark of 15.2 seconds at the slightly shorter 120 yards - while Choisel fell and did not finish.

Rank	Athlete	Nation	Time	Notes
1	Alvin Kraenzlein	United States	15.6	Q, OR
2	Frederick Moloney	United States	16.0	R
3	John McLean	United States	16.3	R
—	Eugène Choisel	France	DNF	R

==== Semifinal 2 ====
Klingelhoefer pulled up lame, leaving Pritchard to win by a yard and a half.

Rank	Athlete	Nation	Time	Notes
1	Norman Pritchard	India	16.6	Q
2	William Remington	United States	16.8	R
3	William Lewis	United States	Unknown	R
—	Adolphe Klingelhoefer	France	DNF	R

==== Semifinal 3 ====
Lécuyer had no competition in this heat, and automatically advanced to the final.

Rank	Athlete	Nation	Time	Notes
1	Jean Lécuyer	France	WO	Q

=== Repechage ===
The two repechage heats consisted of the hurdlers that had not qualified in the first round. Adolphe Klingelhoefer was forced to scratch due to injury.

The winner of each heat joined the three first round heat winners in the final.

==== Repechage heat 1 ====
Moloney beat Lewis by 5 1/2 yards.

Rank	Athlete	Nation	Time	Notes
1	Frederick Moloney	United States	17.0	Q
2	William Lewis	United States	17.8	
3	Eugène Choisel	France	Unknown	

==== Repechage heat 2 ====
McLean won the second repechage heat easily to become the third person from the first preliminary heat to qualify for the final.

Rank	Athlete	Nation	Time	Notes
1	John McLean	United States	17.0	Q
2	William Remington	United States	Unknown	
—	Adolphe Klingelhoefer	France	DNS	

=== Final ===
McLean gained an early lead, due in part to a starter's error, but Kraenzlein caught him at the eighth hurdle and ran away to win by three yards, thus winning the first athletics competition of the 1900 Games. McLean was able to hold off a challenge from Moloney to finish second by a foot, with Pritchard, the winner of the second heat, pulling up lame.

All three of the Americans had come from the first preliminary heat.

Rank	Athlete	Nation	Time	Notes
1st place, gold medalist(s)	Alvin Kraenzlein	United States	15.4	OR
2nd place, silver medalist(s)	John McLean	United States	15.5	
3rd place, bronze medalist(s)	Frederick Moloney	United States	15.6	
4	Jean Lécuyer	France	Unknown	
—	Norman Pritchard	India	DNF	

== Results summary ==
Rank	Athlete	Nation	Semifinals	Repechage	Final	Notes
1st place, gold medalist(s)	Alvin Kraenzlein	United States	15.6	Bye	15.4	OR
2nd place, silver medalist(s)	John McLean	United States	16.3	17.0	15.5	
3rd place, bronze medalist(s)	Frederick Moloney	United States	16.0	17.0	15.6	
4	Jean Lécuyer	France	WO	Bye	Unknown	
5	Norman Pritchard	India	16.6	Bye	DNF	
6	William Lewis	United States	Unknown	17.8	Did not advance	
7	William Remington	United States	16.8	Unknown	Did not advance	2nd in repechage
8	Eugène Choisel	France	DNF	Unknown	Did not advance	3rd in repechage
9	Adolphe Klingelhoefer	France	DNF	DNS	Did not advance	

== Sources ==
- International Olympic Committee.
- De Wael, Herman. Herman's Full Olympians: "Athletics 1900". Accessed 18 March 2006. Available electronically at.
- Mallon, Bill (1998). The 1900 Olympic Games, Results for All Competitors in All Events, with Commentary. Jefferson, North Carolina: McFarland & Company, Inc., Publishers. ISBN 0-7864-0378-0.
