= Adolphe Klingelhoefer =

French athlete

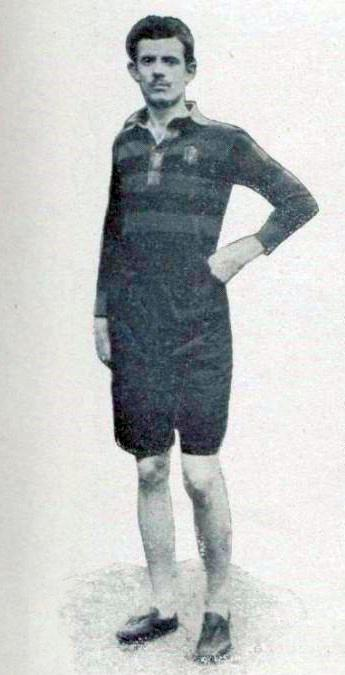

Personal information
- Born: 2 May 1880 Paris, France
- Died: 19 December 1956 (aged 76) Courbevoie, France

Sport
- Country: France
- Sport: Track and field, Rugby Union
- Club: Racing Club de France

Adolphe Klingelhoefer (2 May 1880 - 19 December 1956) was a French track and field athlete who competed at the 1900 Summer Olympics in Paris, France, he also played rugby union.

== Biography ==
Klingelhoefer was born and raised in Paris, France, he was the son of a Brazilian diplomat who was the vice-consul at the Brazilian embassy in France. Between 1899-1903 he won six French national titles, 4 in the 110 metre hurdles and two in the 400 metre hurdles, and set two national records in the 110 metre hurdles in 1903 and 1904.

Klingelhoefer competed in the 1900 Summer Olympics, he entered three events, with little success, in the 60 metres he finished outside the top three in his heat so did not qualify for the next round, in the 200 metres he finished third in his heat which still wasn't good enough to qualify for the final, and finally in the 110 metres hurdles he pulled up lame in his heat so did not finish the race or qualify for the final.

He was also a good rugby player, and was actually one of two try scorers when his club Racing Club de France won the 1901–02 French Rugby Union Championship.

He became a high-ranking official in the Brazilian Chamber of Commerce and made his money in the financial world, although his Olympic results have him listed as French, documents released in 2009 from an Olympic historian, stated at the time of the 1900 Olympics Klingelhofer was a Brazilian national, but still to the day these facts are not recognised by the Brazilian Olympic Committee or the International Olympic Committee.
