= Athletics at the 1900 Summer Olympics – Men's 200 metres =

Men's 200 metres at the Games of the II Olympiad
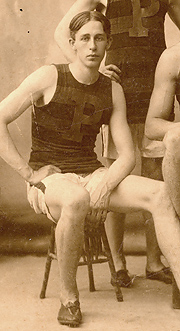
- Walter Tewksbury
- Venue: Bois de Boulogne
- Date: July 22, 1900
- Competitors: 8 from 7 nations
- Winning time: 22.2 OR

Medalists
1st place, gold medalist(s)		Walter Tewksbury; United States
2nd place, silver medalist(s)		Norman Pritchard; India
3rd place, bronze medalist(s)		Stan Rowley; Australia

The men's 200 metres was a sprinting event on the athletics programme at the 1900 Summer Olympics in Paris. It was held on July 22, 1900, well after most of the rest of the athletics events. The 1900 Games were the first time the 200 metres was contested. The races were held on a track of 500 metres in circumference. Eight athletes from seven nations competed. The event was won by Walter Tewksbury of the United States. Norman Pritchard of India took silver while Australian Stan Rowley earned bronze.

== Background ==
This was the first appearance of the event, which was not held at the first Olympics in 1896 but has been on the program ever since. American Walter Tewksbury had taken silver in the shorter sprint events in 1900 (the 60 metres and 100 metres), but the winners of those events did not compete in the 200 metres; he had also won the 400 metres hurdles. Stan Rowley of Australia had finished third in both of those events as well. Norman Pritchard of India had finished second in the 200 metres hurdles, beating Tewksbury who finished third.

The seven nations that contested the first 200 metres race were Australia, France, Germany, Hungary, India, Norway, and the United States.

== Competition format ==
There were two rounds, semifinals and a final. The top two runners in each of the two semifinals advanced to the final. The "track" was a grass field with a 500 metre long course winding through trees.

== Records ==
These were the standing world and Olympic records (in seconds) prior to the 1900 Summer Olympics.

World record	Jim Maybury (USA)^{*}	21.4	Chicago, United States	5 June 1897
Olympic record		—		

^{*} unofficial

Bill Holland set the first Olympic record when he won the first heat of the first round in 24.0 seconds. In the final Walter Tewksbury set a new Olympic record with 22.2 seconds.

== Schedule ==
Date	Time	Round
Sunday, 22 July 1900		Semifinals; Final

== Results ==
=== Semifinals ===
In the semifinals, there were two heats. The top two runners in each advanced to the final.

==== Semifinal 1 ====
The first heat was an easy win for Holland.

Rank	Athlete	Nation	Time	Notes
1	Bill Holland	United States	24.0	Q, OR
2	Norman Pritchard	India	Unknown	Q
3	Adolphe Klingelhoefer	France	Unknown	
4	Ernő Schubert	Hungary	Unknown	

==== Semifinal 2 ====
Rowley beat Tewksbury by about a foot, and neither of the other two runners were close.

Rank	Athlete	Nation	Time	Notes
1	Stan Rowley	Australia	25.0	Q
2	Walter Tewksbury	United States	25.1	Q
3	Yngvar Bryn	Norway	Unknown	
4	Albert Werkmüller	Germany	Unknown	

=== Final ===
Tewksbury passed Pritchard in the second half of the race and crossed the finish line 2½ yards clear of the field, with Pritchard half a yard ahead of Rowley, and Rowley six inches ahead of Holland, who was last in the final despite improving his time by over a second.

Rank	Athlete	Nation	Time	Notes
1st place, gold medalist(s)	Walter Tewksbury	United States	22.2	OR
2nd place, silver medalist(s)	Norman Pritchard	India	22.8	
3rd place, bronze medalist(s)	Stan Rowley	Australia	22.9	
4	Bill Holland	United States	22.9	

== Sources ==
- International Olympic Committee.
- De Wael, Herman. Herman's Full Olympians: "Athletics 1900". Accessed 18 March 2006. Available electronically at.
- Mallon, Bill (1998). The 1900 Olympic Games, Results for All Competitors in All Events, with Commentary. Jefferson, North Carolina: McFarland & Company, Inc., Publishers. ISBN 0-7864-0378-0.
