= The Siren (1927 film) =

1927 silent film by Byron Haskin

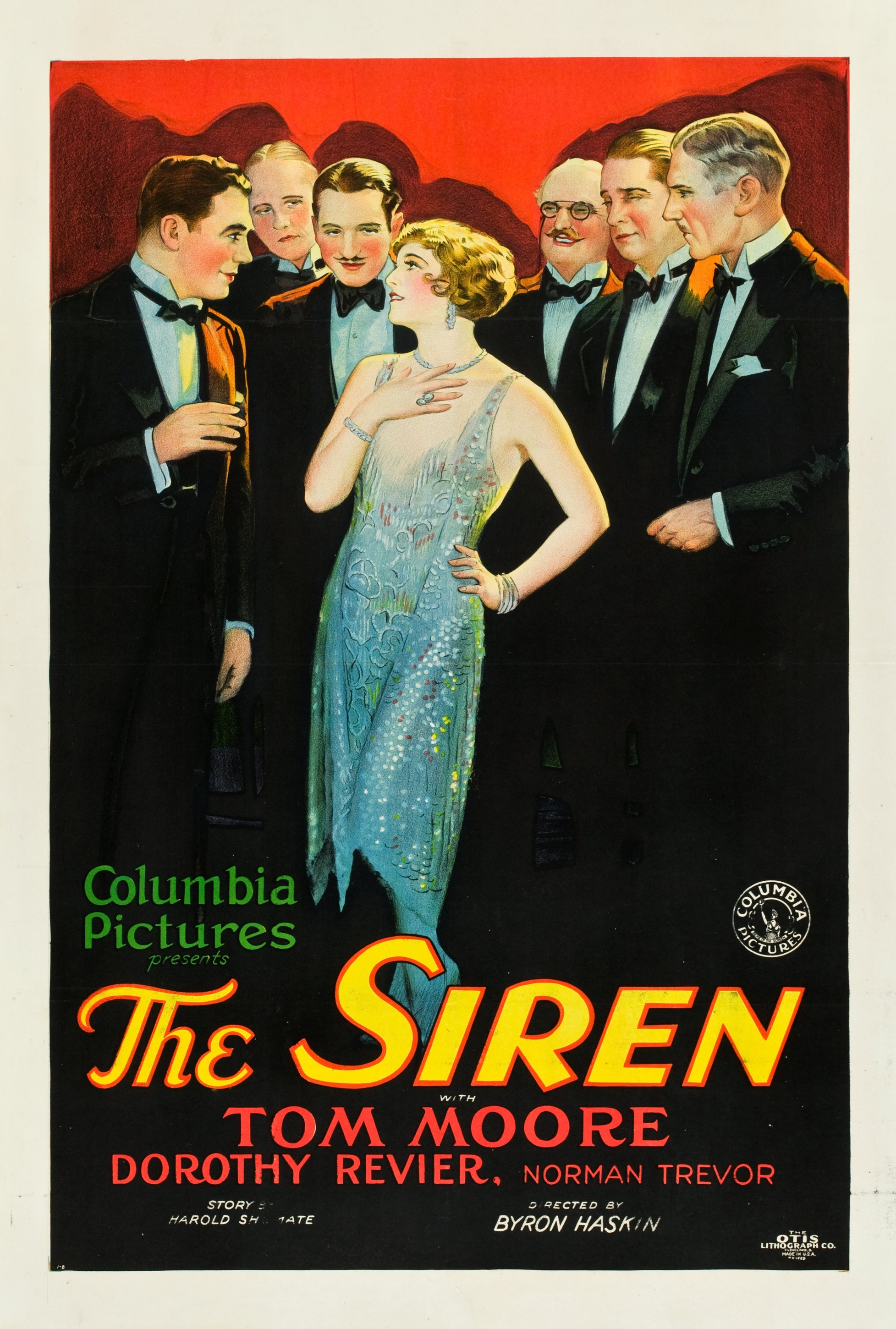
- Poster for the film
- Directed by: Byron Haskin
- Screenplay by: Elmer Harris
- Story by: Harold Shumate
- Produced by: Harry Cohn
- Starring: Tom Moore; Dorothy Revier; Norman Trevor
- Cinematography: Ray June
- Edited by: Arthur Roberts
- Production company: Columbia Pictures
- Release date: December 20, 1927 (US)
- Running time: 6 reels
- Country: United States
- Language: English

The Siren is a lost 1927 American silent melodrama film directed by Byron Haskin. It stars Tom Moore, Dorothy Revier, and Norman Trevor, and was released on December 20, 1927.

== Plot ==
When her car breaks down during a rainstorm, Glenna Marsh seeks refuge in a hunting lodge she stumbles upon. When the lodge's owner, Peter Dane, comes home to find her there, he understands her predicament and allows her to stay the night. Marsh is a socialite, who frequently throws parties, at which gambling can be found. She invites Dane to her next party, which is scheduled for a few days later. One of her frequent guests, with whom she also has a romantic dalliance, is Cole Norwood. Unbeknownst to Marsh, Norwood is a card sharp, who is using her social position to gain access to her wealthy friends, who he is fleecing.

When the day of the party arrives, Dane attends, and there is an attraction between Marsh and him. During the course of the party, Marsh witnesses Norwood cheating by taking cards from the discard pile. Horrified, she exposes him and orders him from her house. As the party breaks up, Dane stays behind to comfort Marsh. Norwood returns and accuses Marsh of being his paramour and business partner. While the former is true the latter is not, and a fight ensues between Dane and Norwood. During the fight, a drape catches fire. Norwood knocks Dane temporarily senseless, and is about to kill him, when Marsh grabs a revolver and shoots Norwood. Dane revives and he and Marsh flee, unable to get to Norwood to pull him from the flames. However, Marsh's butler, Fleet, who was helping Norwood in his cheating scheme, does pull Norwood from the flames, but he is horribly burned.

When he recovers, Norwood's face is so horribly disfigured that he is unrecognizable. He takes on the name of Felipe Vincenti, who poses as a newsman from South America. He gets Fleet to go to the police and say that Marsh killed Norwood, who has been presumed dead, in order to prevent Norwood to reveal to Dane that Norwood and Marsh were lovers. Then in his new persona, he leads the campaign to get Marsh convicted of his murder. She is eventually tried and convicted of the murder, and is sentenced to hang. However, as she waits on the gallows, she is saved when Dane forces Fleet to confess that he lied about the murder, and reveals the true identity of Vincenti.

== Cast ==
- Tom Moore as Peter Dane
- Dorothy Revier as Glenna Marsh
- Norman Trevor as Cole Norwood/Felipe Vincenti
- Jed Prouty as Geoffrey Fuller
- Otto Hoffman as Fleet

== Production ==
In late November 1927 it was announced that Tom Moore and Dorothy Revier would be appearing in the film. Priscilla Dean had originally been cast in the leading role, and the film had been advertised to theater chains with her in the part. Shortly later, in the first week of December, Byron Haskin's involvement in the picture as director was revealed, and production had begun on the film. It was Haskin's first directing assignment under his new contract with Columbia. In mid-December Norman Trevor was added to the cast in dual roles. The film was released on December 20, 1927.

== Reception ==
Harrison's Reports gave the film a lukewarm review based on the film's content, which they found morbid. They did not like the fact that the final moment of the picture portrayed a woman on the gallows awaiting her death. They did find the early plot nicely done.
