= Frederick Moloney =

American athlete

Olympic medal record

Men's athletics

Representing the United States
| Bronze medal – third place | 1900 Paris | 110 metre hurdles |

Frederick Graham Moloney (August 4, 1882 in Ottawa, Illinois – December 24, 1941 in Chicago, Illinois) was an American athlete who competed in the early twentieth century. He specialized in the 110 metre hurdles and won a bronze medal in Athletics at the 1900 Summer Olympics in Paris with a time of 15.6 seconds. John McLean took silver with a time of 15.5 seconds.

Moloney also competed in the 100 metres event, placing second in his first-round heat, third in his semifinal, and in the bottom half of the repechage to finish between 7th and 9th overall. In the 200 metre hurdles, he finished third in his semifinal heat and did not advance to the final.

His brother William also competed in the 1900 Olympics.
