= Albert Werkmüller =

German sprinter

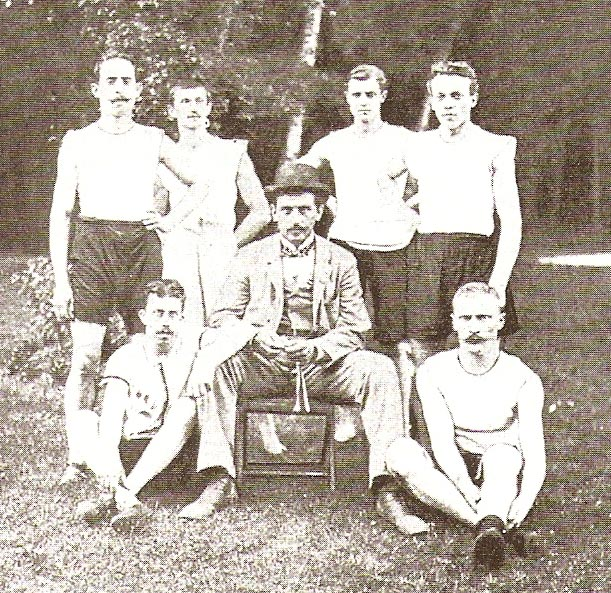
Albert Werkmuller

Albert Karl Werkmüller (31 December 1879 – 21 August 1914) was a German track and field athlete who competed at the 1900 Summer Olympics in Paris, France. Werkmüller competed in the 200 metres. He placed either fourth in his four-man first round (semifinals) heat and did not qualify for the final. He was born in Berlin.
