= Athletics at the 1900 Summer Olympics – Men's 200 metres hurdles =

Men's 200 metres hurdles at the Games of the II Olympiad
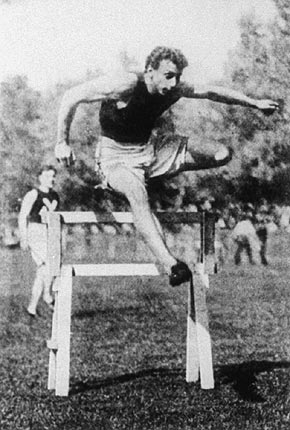
- Alvin Kraenzlein
- Venue: Bois de Boulogne
- Date: July 16, 1900
- Competitors: 11 from 5 nations
- Winning time: 25.4 OR

Medalists
1st place, gold medalist(s)		Alvin Kraenzlein; United States
2nd place, silver medalist(s)		Norman Pritchard; India
3rd place, bronze medalist(s)		Walter Tewksbury; United States

The men's 200 metres hurdles was a hurdling event on the athletics programme at the 1900 Summer Olympics in Paris. It was held on July 16, 1900. 11 athletes from five nations competed in the middle of the three hurdling events. The event was won by Alvin Kraenzlein of the United States, earning his fourth individual gold in athletics in one Games—a record that still stands as of the 2016 Games. The silver medal went to Norman Pritchard of India, while another American (Walter Tewksbury) earned bronze.

== Background ==
This was the first of only two times the event was held; it would return in 1904 but then be eliminated from the programme. American Alvin Kraenzlein was an overwhelming favorite; he had already won the 60 metres, 110 metres hurdles, and long jump by the time of the 200 metres hurdles.

France, Germany, Hungary, India, and the United States competed in the inaugural 200 metres hurdles event.

== Competition format ==
The low hurdles competition consisted of two rounds: semifinals and a final. The semifinal round consisted of two heats, with 5 hurdlers in one and 6 in the other. The top 2 athletes in each semifinal advanced to the final.

== Records ==
World record	Alvin Kraenzlein (USA)	23.8y (220 yds = 201.1 m)	New York City	28 May 1898
Olympic record	New event	n/a	n/a	n/a

This was the first time the event was held. Alvin Kraenzlein set the first Olympic record for this event when he ran 27.0 seconds in the first heat of the first round. Norman Pritchard improved this record in the second heat with 26.8 seconds. Finally Alvin Kraenzlein took the Olympic record by winning the final with 25.4 seconds.

== Schedule ==
Date	Time	Round
Monday, 16 July 1900		Semifinals; Final

== Results ==
=== Semifinals ===
In the semifinal round, there were two heats. The top two runners in each advanced to the final.

==== Semifinal 1 ====
Kraenzlein won by four yards.

Rank	Athlete	Nation	Time	Notes
1	Alvin Kraenzlein	United States	27.0	Q, OR
2	Eugène Choisel	France	27.5	Q
3	Frederick Moloney	United States	27.6	
4	William Remington	United States	Unknown	
5	Gustav Rau	Germany	Unknown	

==== Semifinal 2 ====
Pritchard won by two yards.

Rank	Athlete	Nation	Time	Notes
1	Norman Pritchard	India	26.8	Q, OR
2	Walter Tewksbury	United States	27.1	Q
3	Thaddeus McClain	United States	27.2	
4	Henri Tauzin	France	Unknown	
5	William Lewis	United States	Unknown	
6	Zoltán Speidl	Hungary	Unknown	

=== Final ===
Kraenzlein won by five yards, despite having been penalized one metre for a false start. The 200 metre hurdles was his fourth individual victory in Paris; no other track and field athlete has won as many individual victories in a single Olympics.

Rank	Athlete	Nation	Time	Notes
1st place, gold medalist(s)	Alvin Kraenzlein	United States	25.4	OR
2nd place, silver medalist(s)	Norman Pritchard	India	26.0	
3rd place, bronze medalist(s)	Walter Tewksbury	United States	26.1	
4	Eugène Choisel	France	Unknown	

== Results summary ==
Rank	Athlete	Nation	Semifinals	Final	Notes
1st place, gold medalist(s)	Alvin Kraenzlein	United States	27.0	25.4	OR
2nd place, silver medalist(s)	Norman Pritchard	India	26.8	26.0	
3rd place, bronze medalist(s)	Walter Tewksbury	United States	27.1	26.1	
4	Eugène Choisel	France	27.5	Unknown	
5	Thaddeus McClain	United States	27.2	did not advance	
6	Frederick Moloney	United States	27.6	did not advance	
7	William Remington	United States	Unknown	did not advance	4th in semifinal
7	Henri Tauzin	France	Unknown	did not advance	4th in semifinal
9	William Lewis	United States	Unknown	did not advance	5th in semifinal
9	Gustav Rau	Germany	Unknown	did not advance	5th in semifinal
11	Zoltán Speidl	Hungary	Unknown	did not advance	6th in semifinal

== Sources ==
- International Olympic Committee.
- De Wael, Herman. Herman's Full Olympians: "Athletics 1900". Accessed 18 March 2006. Available electronically at.
- Mallon, Bill (1998). The 1900 Olympic Games, Results for All Competitors in All Events, with Commentary. Jefferson, North Carolina: McFarland & Company, Inc., Publishers. ISBN 0-7864-0378-0.
