= Norman Pritchard =

British-Indian athlete (1875–1929)

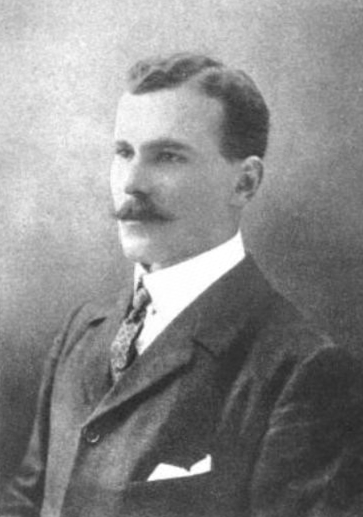
- Portrait of Pritchard, The Sketch (28 February 1900)

Personal information
- Full name: Norman Gilbert Pritchard
- Nationality: British
- Born: 23 June 1875 Calcutta, Bengal Presidency, British India
- Died: 30 October 1929 (aged 54) Los Angeles, United States
- Education: St. Xavier's College, Kolkata

Sport
- Sport: Athletics
- Events: 200 metre hurdles 200 metres
Medal record
Men's athletics
Representing (British Raj) India
Olympic Games
Silver medal – second place	1900 Paris	200 metres hurdles
Silver medal – second place	1900 Paris	200 metres

Norman Gilbert Pritchard (23 June 1875 – 30 October 1929), also known by his stage name Norman Trevor, was a British-Indian athlete and actor who became the first Asian-born athlete to win an Olympic medal when he won two silver medals in athletics at the 1900 Paris Olympics representing India. He won India's first medal at the Olympics in the 200 metres and the 200 metres hurdles.

== Biography ==
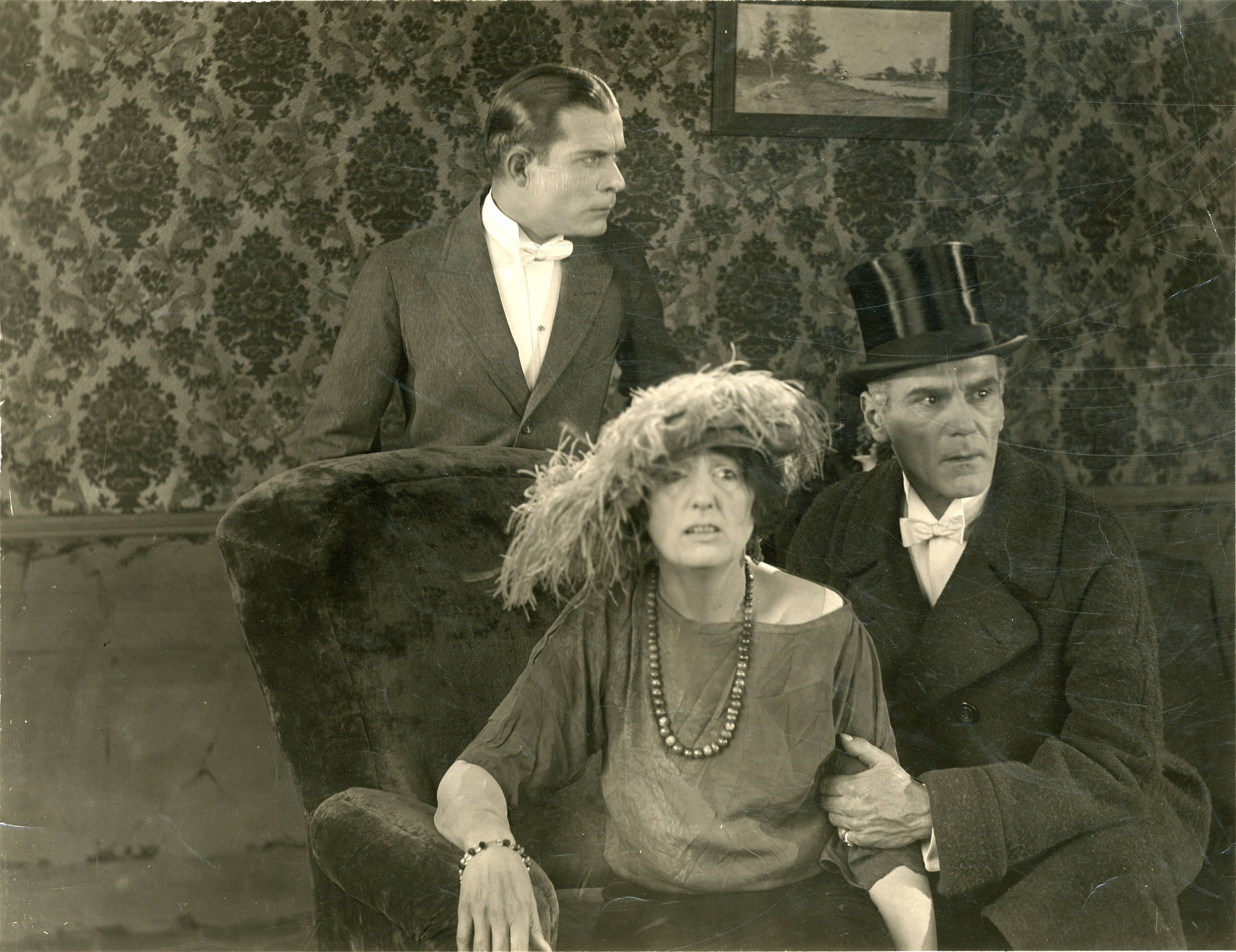
Pritchard (right) with Earle Foxe and Florence Reed in The Black Panther's Cub (1921).

Norman Pritchard was born in Calcutta to George Petersen Pritchard and Helen Maynard Pritchard. He studied at St. Xavier's College, Calcutta, and is credited with the first hat-trick in an open football tournament in India, for Saint Xavier's against Sovabazar in July 1897.

Pritchard won the Bengal province 100 yards sprint title for seven consecutive years, from 1894 to 1900 and set a meet record in 1898–99. He also won the 440-yard dash and the 120 yards hurdles. Pritchard finished second in the 120 yard hurdles event at the 1900 AAA Championships.

Pritchard was the first Indian athlete to participate in the Olympic Games and was also the first to win an Olympic medal and also represent an Asian nation. He won two silver medals at the 1900 Summer Olympics in Paris, coming second in the 200 metres behind Walter Tewksbury of the United States and second in the 200 metres hurdles behind the legendary Alvin Kraenzlein, also of the United States. He reached the final of the 110 metres hurdles, but did not finish, and also participated in the 60 metres and 100 metres sprints, in which he failed to qualify for the finals.

He served as Secretary of the Indian Football Association from 1900 to 1902. He moved permanently to Britain in 1905.

He then moved to the United States to pursue a career in acting and became the first Olympian to act in silent Hollywood movies under the screen name, Norman Trevor. He had a notable stage success as the leading male in The Goose Hangs High, which ran for six months on Broadway during 1924. Trevor was opposed to the star system in theatre, so his popularity in this caused him some embarrassment when producers offered to "star" him.

== Nationality claim ==
In 2005 the IAAF published the official track and field statistics for the 2004 Summer Olympics. In the historical records section Pritchard was listed as having competed for Great Britain in 1900. Some research by Olympic historians has shown that Pritchard was chosen to represent Great Britain after competing in the British AAA championship in July 1900. However, most of the British press in 1900 records his nation as being India The IOC regards Pritchard as having competed for India, with his two medals being credited to India.

== Death ==
He died in Los Angeles of a brain malady on 30 October 1929.

== Selected filmography ==
- The Ivory Snuff Box (1915)
- The Daughter Pays (1920)
- Romance (1920)
- The Black Panther's Cub (1921)
- Jane Eyre (1921)
- The Side Show of Life (1924)
- Roulette (1924)
- Wages of Virtue (1924)
- The Man Who Found Himself (1925)
- Dancing Mothers (1926)
- The Ace of Cads (1926)
- The Song and Dance Man (1926)
- Beau Geste (1926)
- The Warning (1927)
- New York (1927)
- Afraid to Love (1927)
- The Wizard (1927)
- The Music Master (1927)
- Children of Divorce (1927)
- Sorrell and Son (1927)
- The Siren (1927)
- Mad Hour (1928)
- Restless Youth (1928)
- The Love Trap (1929)

== See also ==
- India at the Summer Olympics
