= Athletics at the 1900 Summer Olympics – Men's 400 metres hurdles =

Athletics at the Olympics

Men's 400 metres hurdles at the Games of the II Olympiad
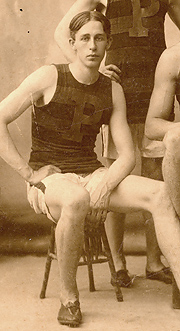
- Walter Tewksbury
- Venue: Bois de Boulogne
- Dates: July 14, 1900 (semifinals); July 15, 1900 (final)
- Competitors: 5 from 4 nations
- Winning time: 57.6 OR

Medalists
1st place, gold medalist(s)		Walter Tewksbury; United States
2nd place, silver medalist(s)		Henri Tauzin; France
3rd place, bronze medalist(s)		George Orton; United States

The men's 400 metres hurdles was a track & field athletics event at the 1900 Summer Olympics in Paris. This event was held for the first time at the Olympics. The competition took part on July 14 and July 15, 1900. The race was held on a track of 500 metres in circumference. Five athletes from four nations competed in the longest of the three hurdling events. The event was won by Walter Tewksbury of the United States. Henri Tauzin of France earned silver, while George Orton of Canada, who was representing the United States, took bronze.

== Background ==
This was the first time the event was held. Introduced along with the men's 200 metres hurdles, the men's 400 metres hurdles was the only one of the two new hurdles events that would stay on the programme long-term, joining the 110 metres hurdles that had been contested in 1896. The 400 metres version would be held in 1900, 1904, and 1908 before being left off for one Games in 1912; when the Olympics returned after World War I, the men's 400 metres hurdles was back and would continue to be contested at every Games thereafter.

This was an unfamiliar event to many of the competing nations; it was not held at the AAU or the AAA championships. Only France regularly had competitions of this format; Henri Tauzin was their five-time title-winner.

Bohemia, Canada, France, the United States competed in the inaugural 400 metres hurdles event.

== Competition format ==
The competition consisted of two rounds: semifinals and a final. The semifinal round consisted of two heats, with the top two athletes in each semi-final to advance to the final.

While 10 men entered, only five started, meaning the semi-finals eliminated only one competitor, making their purpose somewhat questionable: one of the four finalists scratched, meaning the final had three competitiors.

Most of the hurdles were telephone poles laid across the track, with the final hurdle being a water jump.

== Records ==
These were the standing world and Olympic records (in seconds) prior to the 1900 Summer Olympics.

World record	Jerome Buck (USA)	56.4^{*}	New York City, United States	19 September 1896
Olympic record	New event	—	—	—

^{*} unofficial 440 yards (= 402.34 m)

The times set in the two heats are uncertain. In the final Walter Tewksbury set the new Olympic record with 57.6 seconds.

== Schedule ==
Date	Time	Round
Saturday, 14 July 1900	11:55	Semifinals
Sunday, 15 July 1900	16:15	Final

== Results ==
=== Semifinals ===
In the semifinal round, there were two heats run on July 14. The top two runners in each advanced to the final, meaning that only one athlete was eliminated in the heats.

==== Semifinal 1 ====
Tewksbury beat Lewis by ten yards; Nedvěd, who was well back in third, was the only athlete eliminated in the semifinals.

Rank	Athlete	Nation	Time	Notes
1	Walter Tewksbury	United States	1:01.0	Q, OR
2	William Lewis	United States	1:02.4	Q
3	Karel Nedvěd	Bohemia	Unknown	

==== Semifinal 2 ====
With only two athletes in the heat, and both to qualify, neither ran anywhere near full pace. In a tight race, Tauzin beat Orton by three inches.

Rank	Athlete	Nation	Time	Notes
1	Henri Tauzin	France	1:00.2	Q, OR
2	George Orton	United States	1:00.2	Q

=== Final ===
Lewis scratched from the final as it was held on a Sunday. For the three starters, this was the only race that posed any sort of challenge, with hurdles fashioned out of 30-foot long telegraph poles and a 16-foot water jump on the final straight.

Tewksbury jumped out to an early lead, and led from start to finish to beat Tauzin by five yards, with Orton a further four yards back.

Rank	Athlete	Nation	Time	Notes
1st place, gold medalist(s)	Walter Tewksbury	United States	57.6	OR
2nd place, silver medalist(s)	Henri Tauzin	France	58.3	
3rd place, bronze medalist(s)	George Orton	United States	58.8	
—	William Lewis	United States	DNS	

== Results summary ==
Rank	Athlete	Nation	Semifinals	Final	Notes
1st place, gold medalist(s)	Walter Tewksbury	United States	1:01.0	57.6	OR
2nd place, silver medalist(s)	Henri Tauzin	France	1:00.2	58.3	
3rd place, bronze medalist(s)	George Orton	United States	1:00.2	58.8	
—	William Lewis	United States	1:02.4	DNS	
5	Karel Nedvěd	Bohemia	Unknown	Did not advance	

== Sources ==
- International Olympic Committee.
- De Wael, Herman. Herman's Full Olympians: "Athletics 1900". Accessed 18 March 2006. Available electronically at.
- Mallon, Bill (1998). The 1900 Olympic Games, Results for All Competitors in All Events, with Commentary. Jefferson, North Carolina: McFarland & Company, Inc., Publishers. ISBN 0-7864-0378-0.
