= George Orton =

1st Canadian to win Olympic gold medal

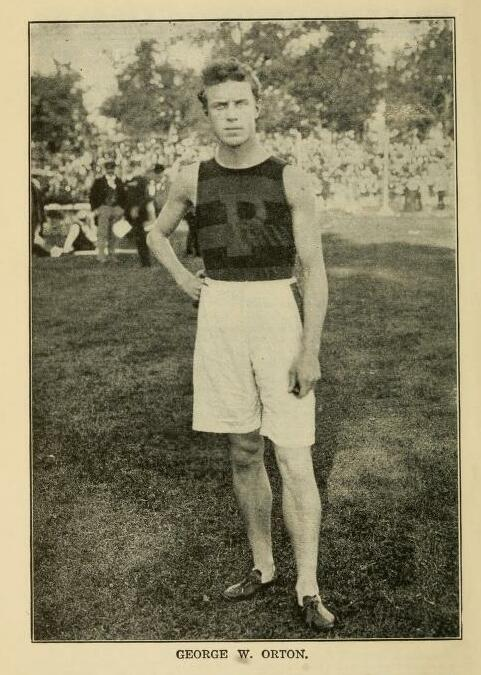
- Orton at 24 wearing University of Pennsylvania uniform, 1897

Personal information
- Born: January 10, 1873 Strathroy, Ontario, Canada
- Died: June 24, 1958 (aged 85) Laconia, New Hampshire, U.S.
- Education: University of Toronto (BA 1883); U. of Pennsylvania (MA, Phd 1896)
- Occupations: Track and Hockey Coach; Sports Author

Sport
- Sport: Athletics, track
- Events: Steeplechase, Hurdles
- College team: University of Pennsylvania
- Club: Toronto Lacrosse, Athletics Assoc.
Medal record
Men's athletics
Representing (United States)
Gold medal – first place	1900 Paris	2500 metres steeplechase
Bronze medal – third place	1900 Paris	400 metre hurdles

George Washington F. Orton (January 10, 1873 – June 24, 1958) was a Canadian middle and long-distance runner. In 1900, he became the first Canadian to win a medal at an Olympic Games. He won a bronze in the 400 metre hurdles, and then, forty-five minutes later, won the gold medal in the 2500 metre steeplechase. He was the first athlete with a disability to win an Olympic gold medal. After his athletic career, he worked as a sports journalist and author, and coached Track and Hockey at the University of Pennsylvania.

== Early life and injury ==
Orton was born in Strathroy, Ontario, on January 10, 1873, the son of Oliver Henry Orton, a labourer, and his wife, Mary Ann Irvine. Orton was paralyzed when he fell out of a tree at the age of three. The fall caused a blood clot on his brain, and severely damaged his right arm. He was later diagnosed with spinal meningitis. He could not walk until age ten, but fully regained his mobility around age twelve.

Orton did his undergraduate studies at the University of Toronto, earning a B.A. in 1893 in Romance Languages. He was then offered a scholarship to the University of Pennsylvania in 1893 to complete his Masters (1894) and Ph.D. (1896), at the age of twenty-three.

=== University of Pennsylvania ===
Orton competed for the University of Pennsylvania while earning his masters (M.A. in 1894) and doctorate (Ph.D. in 1896), and completing his ability to speak nine languages. In 1896 he was captain of Penn's track and field team. He was a founder and captain of Penn Quakers men's ice hockey team in 1896–1897, and was known as "The Father of Philadelphia Hockey". He won seventeen U.S. National Track and Field titles.

== Running career ==
By the time he completed his Ph.D., Orton was the top middle-distance runner in the world. He won a then-record seventeen national titles in the United States, along with seven in Canada. Also at the British AAA Championships steepechase event, he won the title at the 1898 AAA Championships.

He won the U.S. one-mile championship six times, the two-mile steeplechase seven times, the Cross Country twice, the five-mile run and the ten-mile run. While a student at the University of Toronto in 1892, Orton set a mile record of 4:21.8 which lasted for forty-two years. In total, he won 131 races, including a staggering thirty-three National and International championships.

== 1900 Paris Olympic gold ==
Orton's competed at the 1900 Summer Olympics, held in Paris, where he represented the United States. He competed in three official Olympic events: two steeplechase competitions and the 400m hurdles. He also competed in several other events that were "handicap" races and not recognized by the IOC. Orton had to give up either time or distance to other runners in these events, because of his success on the track. He won a bronze medal in the 400m hurdles (the last of which was a water jump). Just forty-five minutes later, suffering from an intestinal virus, Orton won the gold medal in the 2500m steeplechase, setting a world record of 7:34.4. The next day, still ill, he placed fifth in the 4000m steeplechase.

== Father of Philadelphia hockey ==
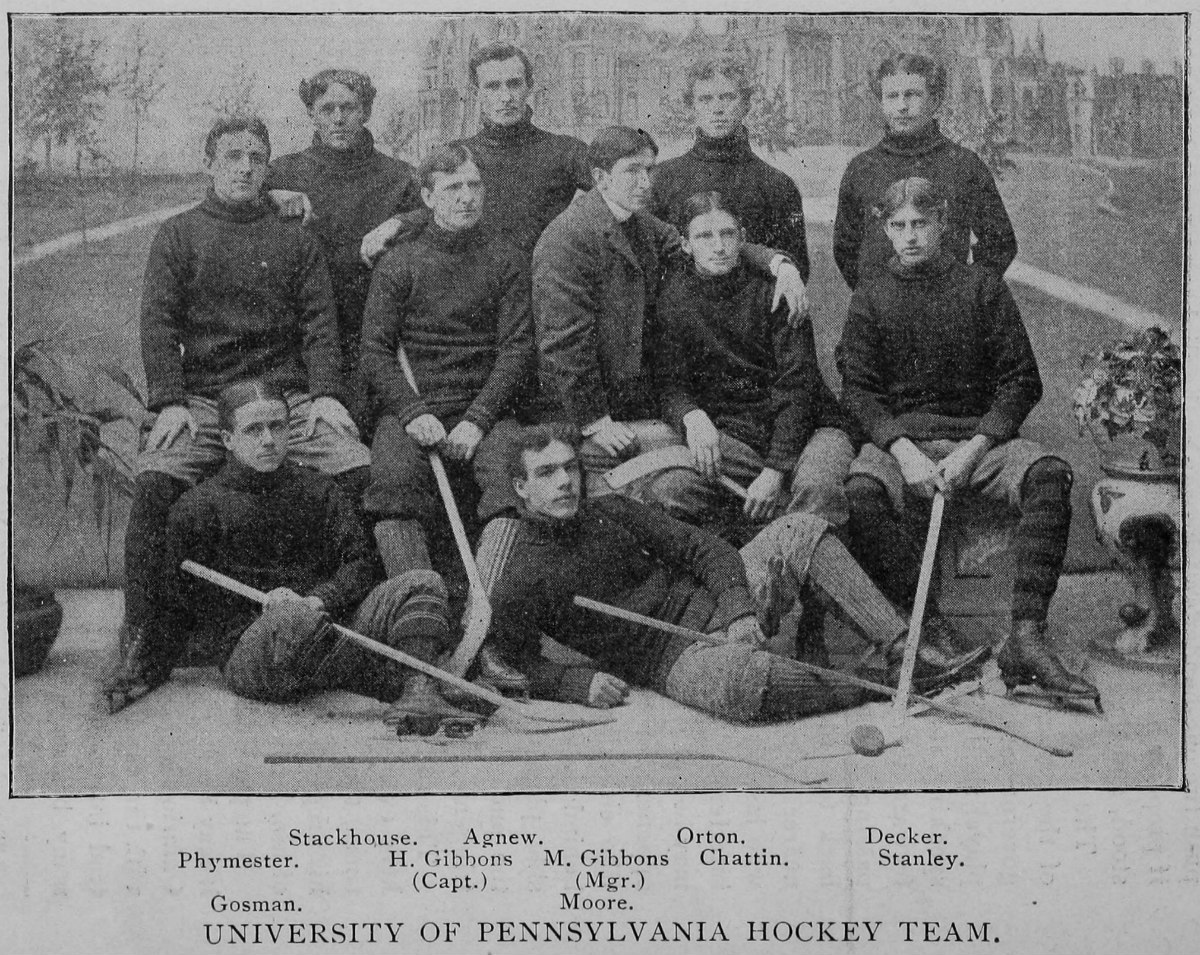
University of Pennsylvania team in front of photo of College Hall in 1896–97, its first season of existence, featuring George Orton (Top row, second from the end (of the right side, viewer's perspective).

Orton was known as "The Father of Philadelphia Hockey". He introduced ice hockey to Philadelphians in 1896 while at Penn, and captained the first team there. Citing a lack of a proper facility, Orton was responsible for the building of the first indoor ice arena in Philadelphia, and the popularity of the sport took off from there. Orton founded the Philadelphia Hockey League in 1897, and the following year formed the Quaker City Hockey Club which played in the highly-competitive American Amateur Hockey League. From 1920 to 1922, Orton coached the Penn Varsity hockey team. Years earlier, while attending the University of Toronto, he helped form the first hockey team there, and also played soccer for the 'Varsity' team in the Toronto Football League. Orton was chosen to play on Canada's team that played against a U.S. all-star team from Fall River, Mass. on June 14, 1891. In 1910 he played centre half for the Philadelphia all-stars against the New York all-stars In Haverford, Pennsylvania, and in 1923, at the age of fifty, he was playing soccer for Merchantville in the Philadelphia league. He was a member of the Merion and Belmont Cricket Clubs of Philadelphia, the New York Athletic Club, the Pennsylvania Athletic Club, the University of Pennsylvania Track Club and was the secretary of the Rose Tree Fox Hunting Club of Media, Pa. for forty-three years. Orton was also a member of the American Academy of Poets, and spoke nine languages fluently.

== Track coach ==
Orton took part in the first Penn Relay Carnival in 1895, and later became the track coach at Penn, taking over after the death of Mike Murphy in 1913. He wrote the definitive training manual for runners, "Distance and Cross Country Running" in 1903, and also wrote a book about the history of Penn Athletics. He was the manager of the Penn Relays from 1919 to 1925, and helped nurture the event in its early years, making it the greatest annual track and field competition in the world. He was inducted into Canada's Sports Hall of Fame and the Canadian Olympic Hall of Fame, as well as the University of Pennsylvania Hall of Fame and the Philadelphia Sports Hall of Fame. His other books included the Bob Hunt series aimed at young men or boys who enjoy the outdoors. In 1903, Orton co-founded Camp Tecumseh, in Meredith, New Hampshire. A decade later, he founded Camp Iroquois, the first overnight athletic camp for girls and young women.

Orton was competitive in soccer (football) and became a writer on sports and running. In 1911 Orton teamed up with Thomas Cahill to write a guide to association football, or soccer.

Orton was secretary of the Rose Tree Hunt Club.

== Death and legacy ==
Orton was named to the Helm Foundation and University of Pennsylvania Hall of Fame.

He died on June 24, 1958, in Laconia, New Hampshire, at age 85.

A book about Orton, The Greatest Athlete (you've never heard of), was published in 2019.

== College head coaching record ==
Record table
Season	Team	Overall	Conference	Standing	Postseason
Pennsylvania Quakers Independent (1919–1922)
1919–20	Pennsylvania	1–5–1			
1920–21	Pennsylvania	3–5–1			
1921–22	Pennsylvania	2–5–0 ^{†}			
Pennsylvania:		6–15–2			
Total:		6–15–2			
National champion Postseason invitational champion Conference regular season champion Conference regular season and conference tournament champion Division regular season champion Division regular season and conference tournament champion Conference tournament champion

† Orton had requested that he be replaced prior to the season but agreed to remain with the program until a replacement was found.
