= Canada at the 1906 Intercalated Games =

- IOC code: CAN
- NOC: Canadian Olympic Committee

in Athens
- Competitors: 3 in 1 sport
- Medals Ranked 16th: Gold 1 Silver 1 Bronze 0 Total 2

Summer appearances
- 1900; 1904; 1908; 1912; 1920; 1924; 1928; 1932; 1936; 1948; 1952; 1956; 1960; 1964; 1968; 1972; 1976; 1980; 1984; 1988; 1992; 1996; 2000; 2004; 2008; 2012; 2016; 2020; 2024

Winter appearances
- 1924; 1928; 1932; 1936; 1948; 1952; 1956; 1960; 1964; 1968; 1972; 1976; 1980; 1984; 1988; 1992; 1994; 1998; 2002; 2006; 2010; 2014; 2018; 2022; 2026

Canada competed at the 1906 Intercalated Games in Athens, Greece. Three athletes, all men, competed in four events in one sport. These games are not now considered as official Olympic games by the International Olympic Committee, and results are not included in official records and medal counts.

== Medalists ==
Medal	Name	Sport	Event
Gold	Billy Sherring	Athletics	Marathon
Silver	Donald Linden	Athletics	1500 metre walk

== Athletics ==
Athlete	Events	Final	
Athlete	Events	Result	Rank
Billy Sherring	Marathon	2-51:23.6	1st place, gold medalist(s)
Donald Linden	1500 metre walk	7:19.8	2nd place, silver medalist(s)

Field

Athlete	Events	Final	
Athlete	Events	Result	Rank
Ed Archibald	Pole vault	2.750	10
Ed Archibald	Pentathlon (Ancient)	33	7
